= List of teams and cyclists in the 1952 Tour de France =

List of cyclists

As was the custom since 1930, the 1952 Tour de France was contested by national and regional teams. The three major cycling countries in 1952, Italy, Belgium and France, each sent a team of 12 cyclists. Other countries sent teams of 8 cyclists: Switzerland, Luxembourg (together with Australia), Netherlands and Spain. The French regional cyclists were divided into four teams of 12 cyclists: Paris, North East–Center, South East and West–South West. The last team of eight cyclists was made up out of cyclists from the French North African colonies. In the end, Luxembourg only sent 6 cyclists, so all together this made 122 cyclists.

There were 57 French (of whom 6 were Algerian), 13 Italian, 12 Belgian, 8 Dutch, 8 Spanish, 8 Swiss, 5 Luxembourgian and 1 Australian cyclist. The winners of the last two editions, Swiss cyclists Hugo Koblet and Ferdinand Kübler, were injured and did not enter the race, neither did French cyclist Louison Bobet.

On the last press conference before the race, Jacques Goddet did a poll amongst journalists, to see who they considered the main favourite. Coppi received 29 votes in that poll, followed by Géminiani and Bartali, both 26 votes.

== By team ==
Switzerland
No.	Rider	Pos.
1	Heinrich Spuhler (SUI)	72
2	Walter Diggelmann (SUI)	50
3	Marcel Huber (SUI)	DNF
4	Martin Metzger (SUI)	DNF
5	Carlo Lafranchi (SUI)	52
6	Gottfried Weilenmann (SUI)	12
7	Roger Aeschlimann (SUI)	DNF
8	Walter Reiser (SUI)	DNF

Belgium
No.	Rider	Pos.
9	Maurice Blomme (BEL)	DNF
10	Alex Close (BEL)	7
11	Roger Decock (BEL)	38
12	Alois De Hertog (BEL)	13
13	Germain Derycke (BEL)	DNF
14	Maurice Neyt (BEL)	29
15	Stan Ockers (BEL)	2
16	André Rosseel (BEL)	28
17	Robert Vanderstockt (BEL)	DNF
18	Edward Van Ende (BEL)	14
19	Henri Van Kerckhove (BEL)	DNF
20	Rik Van Steenbergen (BEL)	DNF

Italy
No.	Rider	Pos.
21	Mario Baroni (ITA)	41
22	Gino Bartali (ITA)	4
23	Giulio Bresci (ITA)	62
24	Andrea Carrea (ITA)	9
25	Fausto Coppi (ITA)	1
26	Giovanni Corrieri (ITA)	46
27	Fiorenzo Crippa (ITA)	58
28	Franco Franchi (ITA)	27
29	Fiorenzo Magni (ITA)	6
30	Alfredo Martini (ITA)	56
31	Ettore Milano (ITA)	51
32	Luciano Pezzi (ITA)	35

France
No.	Rider	Pos.
33	Robert Bonnaventure (FRA)	64
34	Jean Dotto (FRA)	8
35	Bernard Gauthier (FRA)	63
36	Raphaël Géminiani (FRA)	11
37	Nello Lauredi (FRA)	19
38	Lucien Lazaridès (FRA)	43
39	Édouard Muller (FRA)	DNF
40	Maurice Quentin (FRA)	34
41	Raoul Rémy (FRA)	37
42	Jean Robic (FRA)	5
43	Antonin Rolland (FRA)	21
44	Lucien Teisseire (FRA)	59

Netherlands
No.	Rider	Pos.
45	Hans Dekkers (NED)	60
46	Henk Faanhof (NED)	76
47	Jan Nolten (NED)	15
48	Thijs Roks (NED)	53
49	Hein Van Breenen (NED)	69
50	Wim van Est (NED)	17
51	Gerrit Voorting (NED)	22
52	Wout Wagtmans (NED)	25

Spain
No.	Rider	Pos.
53	Antonio Gelabert (ESP)	10
54	José Gil (ESP)	47
55	Francisco Masip (ESP)	30
56	José Pérez Llácer (ESP)	DNF
57	Bernardo Ruiz (ESP)	3
58	José Serra (ESP)	23
59	Andrés Trobat (ESP)	42
60	Hortensio Vidaurreta (ESP)	DNF

Luxembourg/Australia
No.	Rider	Pos.
61	Robert Bintz (LUX)	DNF
62	René Biver (LUX)	DNS
63	Bim Diederich (LUX)	DNF
64	Johny Goedert (LUX)	57
65	Jean Goldschmit (LUX)	16
66	Willy Kemp (LUX)	DNF
67	John Beasley (AUS)	DNF
68	Edward Smith (AUS)	DNS

France - Paris
No.	Rider	Pos.
69	Louis Caput (FRA)	DNF
70	Jean Carle (FRA)	DNF
71	Robert Chapatte (FRA)	DNF
72	Charles Coste (FRA)	DNF
73	Georges Decaux (FRA)	36
74	Jacques Dupont (FRA)	DNF
75	Pierre Gaudot (FRA)	DNF
76	Jacques Marinelli (FRA)	31
77	Armand Papazian (FRA)	DNF
78	Jacques Renaud (FRA)	40
79	Gino Sciardis (FRA)	DNF
80	Eugène Telotte (FRA)	48

France - North-East/Centre
No.	Rider	Pos.
81	Gilbert Bauvin (FRA)	32
82	Roger Buchonnet (FRA)	DNF
83	Jean-Marie Cieleska (FRA)	DNF
84	Jean de Gribaldy (FRA)	45
85	Adolphe Deledda (FRA)	24
86	Robert Ducard (FRA)	DNF
87	Marcel Dussault (FRA)	DNF
88	Noël Lajoie (FRA)	DNF
89	Georges Meunier (FRA)	DNF
90	Pierre Pardoën (FRA)	55
91	Roger Rossinelli (FRA)	61
92	Alexandre Sowa (FRA)	DNF

France - South-East
No.	Rider	Pos.
93	Jean Bertaina (FRA)	68
94	Siro Bianchi (ITA)	44
95	Dominique Canavèse (FRA)	DNF
96	Albert Chaumarat (FRA)	DNF
97	Édouard Fachleitner (FRA)	DNF
98	Paul Giguet (FRA)	66
99	Michel Llorca (FRA)	DNF
100	Joseph Mirando (FRA)	65
101	Pierre Molinéris (FRA)	DNF
102	Adolphe Pezzuli (FRA)	71
103	René Rotta (FRA)	67
104	Vincent Vitetta (FRA)	20

France - West/South-West
No.	Rider	Pos.
105	André Bernard (FRA)	75
106	René Berton (FRA)	DNF
107	Jean Delahaye (FRA)	73
108	Albert Dolhats (FRA)	DNF
109	Guy Lapébie (FRA)	DNF
110	Jean Le Guilly (FRA)	26
111	Jean Malléjac (FRA)	33
112	Alain Moineau (FRA)	DNF
113	André Dufraisse (FRA)	DNF
114	Tino Sabbadini (FRA)	70
115	Raymond Scardin (FRA)	74
116	Jacques Vivier (FRA)	49

North Africa
No.	Rider	Pos.
117	Mostafa Chareuf (FRA)	DNF
118	Marcel Fernandez (FRA)	54
119	Ahmed Kebaili (FRA)	39
120	Gérard Guercy (FRA)	DNF
121	Henri Paret (FRA)	78
122	Vincent Soler (FRA)	77
123	Abdel-Kader Zaaf (FRA)	DNF
124	Marcel Zélasco (FRA)	18

== By rider ==
Legend
No.	Starting number worn by the rider during the Tour
Pos.	Position in the general classification
DNF	Denotes a rider who did not finish

No.	Name	Nationality	Team	Pos.	Ref
1	Heinrich Spuhler	Switzerland	Switzerland	72	
2	Walter Diggelmann	Switzerland	Switzerland	50	
3	Marcel Huber	Switzerland	Switzerland	DNF	
4	Martin Metzger	Switzerland	Switzerland	DNF	
5	Carlo Lafranchi	Switzerland	Switzerland	52	
6	Gottfried Weilenmann	Switzerland	Switzerland	12	
7	Roger Aeschlimann	Switzerland	Switzerland	DNF	
8	Walter Reiser	Switzerland	Switzerland	DNF	
9	Maurice Blomme	Belgium	Belgium	DNF	
10	Alex Close	Belgium	Belgium	7	
11	Roger Decock	Belgium	Belgium	38	
12	Alois De Hertog	Belgium	Belgium	13	
13	Germain Derycke	Belgium	Belgium	DNF	
14	Maurice Neyt	Belgium	Belgium	29	
15	Stan Ockers	Belgium	Belgium	2	
16	André Rosseel	Belgium	Belgium	28	
17	Robert Vanderstockt	Belgium	Belgium	DNF	
18	Edward Van Ende	Belgium	Belgium	14	
19	Henri Van Kerckhove	Belgium	Belgium	DNF	
20	Rik Van Steenbergen	Belgium	Belgium	DNF	
21	Mario Baroni	Italy	Italy	41	
22	Gino Bartali	Italy	Italy	4	
23	Giulio Bresci	Italy	Italy	62	
24	Andrea Carrea	Italy	Italy	9	
25	Fausto Coppi	Italy	Italy	1	
26	Giovanni Corrieri	Italy	Italy	46	
27	Fiorenzo Crippa	Italy	Italy	58	
28	Franco Franchi	Italy	Italy	27	
29	Fiorenzo Magni	Italy	Italy	6	
30	Alfredo Martini	Italy	Italy	56	
31	Ettore Milano	Italy	Italy	51	
32	Luciano Pezzi	Italy	Italy	35	
33	Robert Bonnaventure	France	France	64	
34	Jean Dotto	France	France	8	
35	Bernard Gauthier	France	France	63	
36	Raphaël Géminiani	France	France	11	
37	Nello Lauredi	France	France	19	
38	Lucien Lazaridès	France	France	43	
39	Édouard Muller	France	France	DNF	
40	Maurice Quentin	France	France	34	
41	Raoul Rémy	France	France	37	
42	Jean Robic	France	France	5	
43	Antonin Rolland	France	France	21	
44	Lucien Teisseire	France	France	59	
45	Hans Dekkers	Netherlands	Netherlands	60	
46	Henk Faanhof	Netherlands	Netherlands	76	
47	Jan Nolten	Netherlands	Netherlands	15	
48	Thijs Roks	Netherlands	Netherlands	53	
49	Hein Van Breenen	Netherlands	Netherlands	69	
50	Wim van Est	Netherlands	Netherlands	17	
51	Gerrit Voorting	Netherlands	Netherlands	22	
52	Wout Wagtmans	Netherlands	Netherlands	25	
53	Antonio Gelabert	Spain	Spain	10	
54	José Gil	Spain	Spain	47	
55	Francisco Masip	Spain	Spain	30	
56	José Pérez Llácer	Spain	Spain	DNF	
57	Bernardo Ruiz	Spain	Spain	3	
58	José Serra	Spain	Spain	23	
59	Andrés Trobat	Spain	Spain	42	
60	Hortensio Vidaurreta	Spain	Spain	DNF	
61	Robert Bintz	Luxembourg	Luxembourg/Australia	DNF	
62	René Biever	Luxembourg	Luxembourg/Australia	DNS	
63	Bim Diederich	Luxembourg	Luxembourg/Australia	DNF	
64	Johny Goedert	Luxembourg	Luxembourg/Australia	57	
65	Jean Goldschmit	Luxembourg	Luxembourg/Australia	16	
66	Willy Kemp	Luxembourg	Luxembourg/Australia	DNF	
67	John Beasley	Australia	Luxembourg/Australia	DNF	
68	Edward Smith	Australia	Luxembourg/Australia	DNS	
69	Louis Caput	France	France - Paris	DNF	
70	Jean Carle	France	France - Paris	DNF	
71	Robert Chapatte	France	France - Paris	DNF	
72	Charles Coste	France	France - Paris	DNF	
73	Georges Decaux	France	France - Paris	36	
74	Jacques Dupont	France	France - Paris	DNF	
75	Pierre Gaudot	France	France - Paris	DNF	
76	Jacques Marinelli	France	France - Paris	31	
77	Armand Papazian	France	France - Paris	DNF	
78	Jacques Renaud	France	France - Paris	40	
79	Gino Sciardis	France	France - Paris	DNF	
80	Eugène Telotte	France	France - Paris	48	
81	Gilbert Bauvin	France	France - North-East/Centre	32	
82	Roger Buchonnet	France	France - North-East/Centre	DNF	
83	Jean-Marie Cieleska	France	France - North-East/Centre	DNF	
84	Jean de Gribaldy	France	France - North-East/Centre	45	
85	Adolphe Deledda	France	France - North-East/Centre	24	
86	Robert Ducard	France	France - North-East/Centre	DNF	
87	Marcel Dussault	France	France - North-East/Centre	DNF	
88	Noël Lajoie	France	France - North-East/Centre	DNF	
89	Georges Meunier	France	France - North-East/Centre	DNF	
90	Pierre Pardoën	France	France - North-East/Centre	55	
91	Roger Rossinelli	France	France - North-East/Centre	61	
92	Alexandre Sowa	France	France - North-East/Centre	DNF	
93	Jean Bertaina	France	France - South-East	68	
94	Siro Bianchi	Italy	France - South-East	44	
95	Dominique Canavèse	France	France - South-East	DNF	
96	Albert Chaumarat	France	France - South-East	DNF	
97	Édouard Fachleitner	France	France - South-East	DNF	
98	Paul Giguet	France	France - South-East	66	
99	Michel Llorca	France	France - South-East	DNF	
100	Joseph Mirando	France	France - South-East	65	
101	Pierre Molinéris	France	France - South-East	DNF	
102	Adolphe Pezzuli	France	France - South-East	71	
103	René Rotta	France	France - South-East	67	
104	Vincent Vitetta	France	France - South-East	20	
105	André Bernard	France	France - West/South-West	75	
106	René Berton	France	France - West/South-West	DNF	
107	Jean Delahaye	France	France - West/South-West	73	
108	Albert Dolhats	France	France - West/South-West	DNF	
109	Guy Lapébie	France	France - West/South-West	DNF	
110	Jean Le Guilly	France	France - West/South-West	26	
111	Jean Malléjac	France	France - West/South-West	33	
112	Alain Moineau	France	France - West/South-West	DNF	
113	André Dufraisse	France	France - West/South-West	DNF	
114	Tino Sabbadini	France	France - West/South-West	70	
115	Raymond Scardin	France	France - West/South-West	74	
116	Jacques Vivier	France	France - West/South-West	49	
117	Mustapha Chareuf	France	North Africa	DNF	
118	Marcel Fernandez	France	North Africa	54	
119	Ahmed Kebaili	France	North Africa	39	
120	Gérard Guercy	France	North Africa	DNF	
121	Henri Paret	France	North Africa	78	
122	Vincent Soler	France	North Africa	77	
123	Abdel-Kader Zaaf	France	North Africa	DNF	
124	Marcel Zélasco	France	North Africa	18	
