= 1952 Tour de France, Stage 1 to Stage 12 =

Cycling race stages

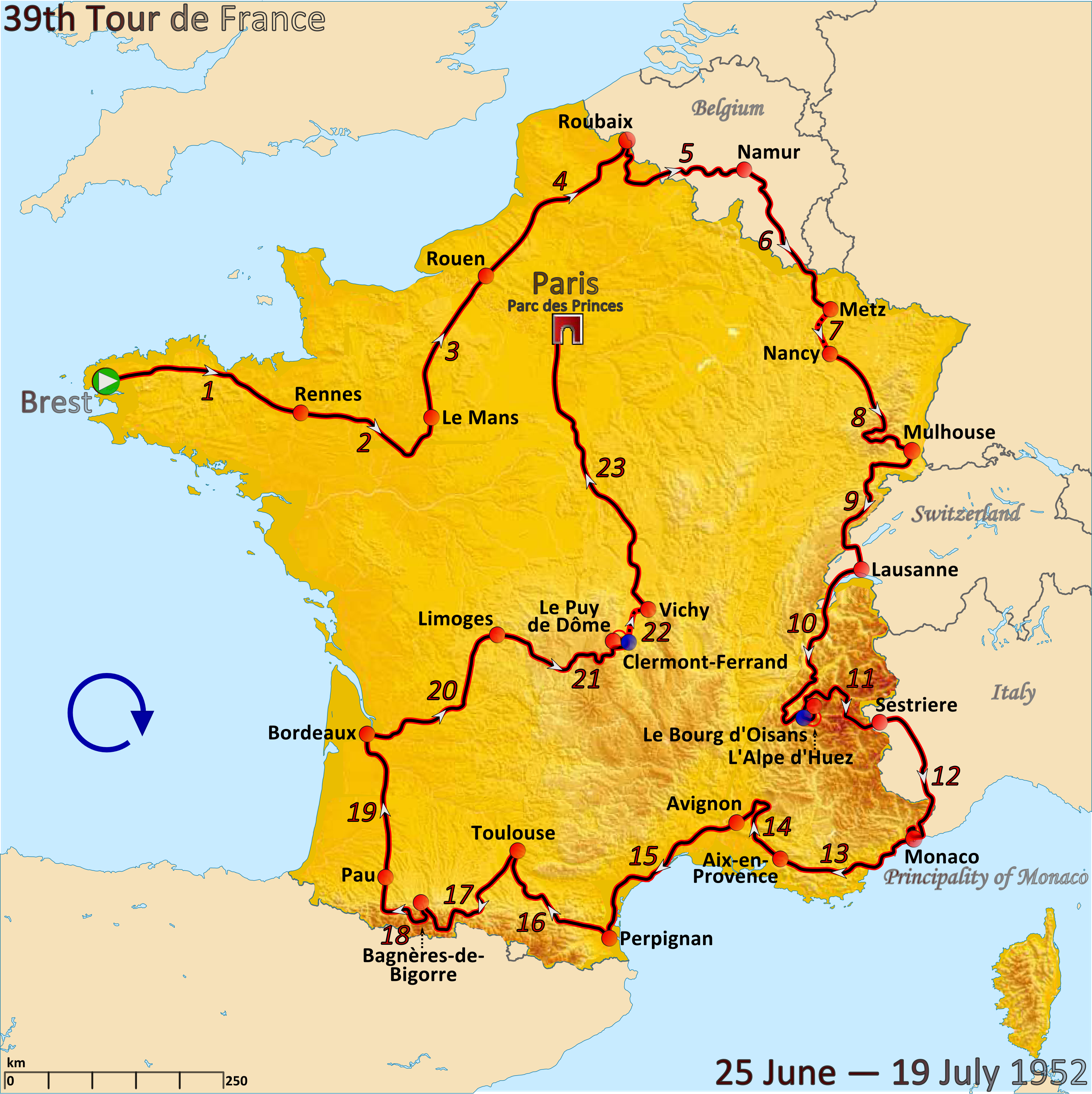
Route of the 1952 Tour de France; followed clockwise, starting in Brest and finishing in Paris

The 1952 Tour de France was the 39th edition of the Tour de France, taking place from 25 June to 19 July. It was composed of 23 stages over 4,807 km (2,987 mi).

The Tour began in Brest on 25 June, and Stage 12 occurred on 7 July with a mountainous stage to Monaco. The race finished in Paris on 19 July.

== Classification standings ==
Legend (Note: Jerseys appearing in the table on the left of the page indicate those worn by the cyclist during the particular stage, while those appearing in the table on the right of the page indicate those awarded to the cyclist after the stage.)
| A yellow jersey | Denotes the leader of the general classification | MG | Denotes the leader of the mountains classification (Note: No jersey was awarded to the leader of the mountains classification until a white jersey with red polka dots was introduced in 1975.) (meilleur grimpeur) |
| | s.t. indicates that the rider was credited with the same time as the one directly above him. | | |

== Stage 1 ==
25 June 1952 — Brest to Rennes, 246 km (153 mi)

Stage 1 result
| Rank | Rider | Team | Time |
|---|---|---|---|
| 1 | Rik Van Steenbergen (BEL) | Belgium | 6h 27' 31" |
| 2 | Maurice Blomme (BEL) | Belgium | s.t. |
| 3 | Pierre Pardoën (FRA) | North-East/Centre | s.t. |
| 4 | Robert Vanderstockt (BEL) | Belgium | + 2' 54" |
| 5 | Jean-Marie Cieleska (FRA) | North-East/Centre | + 3' 08" |
| 6 | André Bernard (FRA) | West/South-West | s.t. |
| 7 | Nello Lauredi (FRA) | France | s.t. |
| 8 | Hans Dekkers (NED) | Netherlands | s.t. |
| 9 | Andrea Carrea (ITA) | Italy | s.t. |
| 10 | Alex Close (BEL) | Belgium | s.t. |

General classification after stage 1
| Rank | Rider | Team | Time |
|---|---|---|---|
| 1 | Rik Van Steenbergen (BEL) | Belgium | 6h 26' 31" |
| 2 | Maurice Blomme (BEL) | Belgium | + 0' 30" |
| 3 | Pierre Pardoën (FRA) | North-East/Centre | + 1' 00" |
| 4 | Robert Vanderstockt (BEL) | Belgium | + 3' 54" |
| 5 | Jean-Marie Cieleska (FRA) | North-East/Centre | + 4' 08" |
| 6 | André Bernard (FRA) | West/South-West | s.t. |
| 7 | Nello Lauredi (FRA) | France | s.t. |
| 8 | Hans Dekkers (NED) | Netherlands | s.t. |
| 9 | Andrea Carrea (ITA) | Italy | s.t. |
| 10 | Alex Close (BEL) | Belgium | s.t. |

== Stage 2 ==
26 June 1952 — Rennes to Le Mans, 181 km (112 mi)

Stage 2 result
| Rank | Rider | Team | Time |
|---|---|---|---|
| 1 | André Rosseel (BEL) | Belgium | 4h 52' 02" |
| 2 | Bernardo Ruiz (ESP) | Spain | s.t. |
| 3 | Pierre Molinéris (FRA) | South-East | s.t. |
| 4 | Alex Close (BEL) | Belgium | s.t. |
| 5 | Dominique Canavèse (FRA) | South-East | + 0' 26" |
| 6 | José Gil (ESP) | Spain | + 0' 54" |
| 7 | Rik Van Steenbergen (BEL) | Belgium | + 1' 10" |
| 8 | Mario Baroni (ITA) | Italy | s.t. |
| 9 | Guy Lapébie (FRA) | West/South-West | s.t. |
| 10 | Wim van Est (NED) | Netherlands | s.t. |

General classification after stage 2
| Rank | Rider | Team | Time |
|---|---|---|---|
| 1 | Rik Van Steenbergen (BEL) | Belgium | 11h 19' 43" |
| 2 | Pierre Pardoën (FRA) | North-East/Centre | + 1' 00" |
| 3 | Alex Close (BEL) | Belgium | + 2' 58" |
| 4 | Maurice Blomme (BEL) | Belgium | + 3' 49" |
| 5 | Robert Vanderstockt (BEL) | Belgium | + 3' 54" |
| 6 | Andrea Carrea (ITA) | Italy | + 4' 08" |
| 7 | Jean-Marie Cieleska (FRA) | North-East/Centre | s.t. |
| 8 | André Rosseel (BEL) | Belgium | + 5' 11" |
| 9 | Bernardo Ruiz (ESP) | Spain | + 5' 41" |
| 10 | Pierre Molinéris (FRA) | South-East | + 6' 11" |

== Stage 3 ==
27 June 1952 — Le Mans to Rouen, 189 km (117 mi)

Stage 3 result
| Rank | Rider | Team | Time |
|---|---|---|---|
| 1 | Nello Lauredi (FRA) | France | 5h 12' 31" |
| 2 | Bernard Gauthier (FRA) | France | s.t. |
| 3 | Gerrit Voorting (NED) | Netherlands | + 3' 25" |
| 4 | Giovanni Corrieri (ITA) | Italy | + 6' 04" |
| 5 | Édouard Fachleitner (FRA) | South-East | + 6' 10" |
| 6 | Jacques Dupont (FRA) | Paris | + 10' 31" |
| 7 | Henk Faanhof (NED) | Netherlands | s.t. |
| 8 | Jean Robic (FRA) | France | s.t. |
| 9 | Gottfried Weilenmann (SUI) | Switzerland | s.t. |
| 10 | Mario Baroni (ITA) | Italy | s.t. |

General classification after stage 3
| Rank | Rider | Team | Time |
|---|---|---|---|
| 1 | Nello Lauredi (FRA) | France | 16h 38' 41" |
| 2 | Bernard Gauthier (FRA) | France | + 3' 43" |
| 3 | Rik Van Steenbergen (BEL) | Belgium | + 4' 04" |
| 4 | Pierre Pardoën (FRA) | North-East/Centre | + 5' 04" |
| 5 | Alex Close (BEL) | Belgium | + 7' 02" |
| 6 | Édouard Fachleitner (FRA) | South-East | + 7' 04" |
| 7 | Gerrit Voorting (NED) | Netherlands | + 7' 38" |
| 8 | Maurice Blomme (BEL) | Belgium | + 7' 53" |
| 9 | Robert Vanderstockt (BEL) | Belgium | + 7' 58" |
| 10 | Jean-Marie Cieleska (FRA) | North-East/Centre | + 8' 12" |

== Stage 4 ==
28 June 1952 — Rouen to Roubaix, 232 km (144 mi)

Stage 4 result
| Rank | Rider | Team | Time |
|---|---|---|---|
| 1 | Pierre Molinéris (FRA) | South-East | 6h 23' 19" |
| 2 | Jean Dotto (FRA) | France | + 2' 34" |
| 3 | Antonin Rolland (FRA) | France | + 3' 21" |
| 4 | Robert Vanderstockt (BEL) | Belgium | s.t. |
| 5 | Fiorenzo Magni (ITA) | Italy | s.t. |
| 6 | Andrea Carrea (ITA) | Italy | s.t. |
| 7 | Alex Close (BEL) | Belgium | s.t. |
| 8 | Maurice Quentin (FRA) | France | s.t. |
| 9 | Lucien Lazaridès (FRA) | France | s.t. |
| 10 | Jean Goldschmit (LUX) | Luxembourg/Australia | s.t. |

General classification after stage 4
| Rank | Rider | Team | Time |
|---|---|---|---|
| 1 | Nello Lauredi (FRA) | France | 23h 09' 39" |
| 2 | Pierre Molinéris (FRA) | South-East | + 1' 36" |
| 3 | Alex Close (BEL) | Belgium | + 2' 44" |
| 4 | Robert Vanderstockt (BEL) | Belgium | + 3' 40" |
| 5 | Andrea Carrea (ITA) | Italy | + 3' 54" |
| 6 | Rik Van Steenbergen (BEL) | Belgium | + 4' 04" |
| 7 | Édouard Fachleitner (FRA) | South-East | + 7' 04" |
| 8 | Antonin Rolland (FRA) | France | + 7' 07" |
| 9 | Hein Van Breenen (NED) | Netherlands | + 7' 15" |
| 10 | Gerrit Voorting (NED) | Netherlands | + 7' 38" |

== Stage 5 ==
29 June 1952 — Roubaix to Namur (Belgium), 197 km (122 mi)

Stage 5 result
| Rank | Rider | Team | Time |
|---|---|---|---|
| 1 | Bim Diederich (LUX) | Luxembourg/Australia | 5h 54' 28" |
| 2 | Fausto Coppi (ITA) | Italy | + 5' 01" |
| 3 | Robert Vanderstockt (BEL) | Belgium | + 5' 43" |
| 4 | Gino Bartali (ITA) | Italy | + 7' 16" |
| 5 | Fiorenzo Magni (ITA) | Italy | + 7' 22" |
| 6 | Jean Goldschmit (LUX) | Luxembourg/Australia | + 7' 30" |
| 7 | Stan Ockers (BEL) | Belgium | + 8' 28" |
| 8 | René Rotta (FRA) | South-East | + 9' 10" |
| 9 | Gottfried Weilenmann (SUI) | Switzerland | + 9' 22" |
| 10 | Gerrit Voorting (NED) | Netherlands | s.t. |

General classification after stage 5
| Rank | Rider | Team | Time |
|---|---|---|---|
| 1 | Nello Lauredi (FRA) | France | 29h 13' 29" |
| 2 | Robert Vanderstockt (BEL) | Belgium | + 1' 00" |
| 3 | Alex Close (BEL) | Belgium | + 2' 44" |
| 4 | Bim Diederich (LUX) | Luxembourg/Australia | + 3' 39" |
| 5 | Fausto Coppi (ITA) | Italy | + 6' 06" |
| 6 | Andrea Carrea (ITA) | Italy | + 6' 17" |
| 7 | Gerrit Voorting (NED) | Netherlands | + 7' 38" |
| 8 | Fiorenzo Magni (ITA) | Italy | + 8' 26" |
| 9 | Jean Goldschmit (LUX) | Luxembourg/Australia | + 8' 34" |
| 10 | Gino Bartali (ITA) | Italy | + 8' 51" |

== Stage 6 ==
30 June 1952 — Namur (Belgium) to Metz, 228 km (142 mi)

Stage 6 result
| Rank | Rider | Team | Time |
|---|---|---|---|
| 1 | Fiorenzo Magni (ITA) | Italy | 7h 07' 56" |
| 2 | Tino Sabbadini (FRA) | West/South-West | + 5' 35" |
| 3 | Gottfried Weilenmann (SUI) | Switzerland | s.t. |
| 4 | Heinrich Spuhler (SUI) | Switzerland | s.t. |
| 5 | Antonin Rolland (FRA) | France | + 7' 38" |
| 6 | Henk Faanhof (NED) | Netherlands | s.t. |
| 7 | Georges Decaux (FRA) | Paris | s.t. |
| 8 | Marcel Fernandez (FRA) | North Africa | s.t. |
| 9 | Mario Baroni (ITA) | Italy | s.t. |
| 10 | Fausto Coppi (ITA) | Italy | s.t. |

General classification after stage 6
| Rank | Rider | Team | Time |
|---|---|---|---|
| 1 | Fiorenzo Magni (ITA) | Italy | 36h 28' 51" |
| 2 | Nello Lauredi (FRA) | France | + 0' 12" |
| 3 | Robert Vanderstockt (BEL) | Belgium | + 0' 13" |
| 4 | Alex Close (BEL) | Belgium | + 2' 56" |
| 5 | Fausto Coppi (ITA) | Italy | + 6' 18" |
| 6 | Andrea Carrea (ITA) | Italy | + 6' 29" |
| 7 | Gerrit Voorting (NED) | Netherlands | + 7' 50" |
| 8 | Jean Goldschmit (LUX) | Luxembourg/Australia | + 8' 46" |
| 9 | Gino Bartali (ITA) | Italy | + 9' 03" |
| 10 | Bim Diederich (LUX) | Luxembourg/Australia | + 9' 30" |

== Stage 7 ==
1 July 1952 — Metz to Nancy, 60 km (37 mi) (ITT)

Stage 7 result
| Rank | Rider | Team | Time |
|---|---|---|---|
| 1 | Fausto Coppi (ITA) | Italy | 1h 32' 59" |
| 2 | Roger Decock (BEL) | Belgium | + 0' 34" |
| 3 | Armand Papazian (FRA) | Paris | + 1' 19" |
| 4 | Giulio Bresci (ITA) | Italy | + 1' 22" |
| 5 | Nello Lauredi (FRA) | France | + 1' 23" |
| 6 | Wim van Est (NED) | Netherlands | + 1' 27" |
| 7 | Martin Metzger (SUI) | Switzerland | + 1' 36" |
| 8 | Ahmed Kebaili (FRA) | North Africa | + 1' 41" |
| 9 | Fiorenzo Magni (ITA) | Italy | + 1' 45" |
| 10 | Bernard Gauthier (FRA) | France | + 1' 46" |

General classification after stage 7
| Rank | Rider | Team | Time |
|---|---|---|---|
| 1 | Nello Lauredi (FRA) | France | 38h 03' 25" |
| 2 | Fiorenzo Magni (ITA) | Italy | + 0' 10" |
| 3 | Fausto Coppi (ITA) | Italy | + 3' 43" |
| 4 | Alex Close (BEL) | Belgium | + 4' 54" |
| 5 | Robert Vanderstockt (BEL) | Belgium | + 5' 36" |
| 6 | Andrea Carrea (ITA) | Italy | + 7' 50" |
| 7 | Jean Goldschmit (LUX) | Luxembourg/Australia | + 9' 24" |
| 8 | Gino Bartali (ITA) | Italy | + 10' 39" |
| 9 | Wim van Est (NED) | Netherlands | + 11' 01" |
| 10 | Gerrit Voorting (NED) | Netherlands | + 12' 02" |

== Stage 8 ==
2 July 1952 — Nancy to Mulhouse, 252 km (157 mi)

Stage 8 result
| Rank | Rider | Team | Time |
|---|---|---|---|
| 1 | Raphaël Géminiani (FRA) | France | 8h 17' 21" |
| 2 | Fiorenzo Magni (ITA) | Italy | + 5' 19" |
| 3 | Stan Ockers (BEL) | Belgium | s.t. |
| 4 | Fausto Coppi (ITA) | Italy | s.t. |
| 5 | Gottfried Weilenmann (SUI) | Switzerland | s.t. |
| 6 | Alois De Hertog (BEL) | Belgium | s.t. |
| 7 | Nello Lauredi (FRA) | France | s.t. |
| 8 | Alex Close (BEL) | Belgium | s.t. |
| 9 | Jean Le Guilly (FRA) | West/South-West | s.t. |
| 10 | Antonio Gelabert (ESP) | Spain | s.t. |

General classification after stage 8
| Rank | Rider | Team | Time |
|---|---|---|---|
| 1 | Fiorenzo Magni (ITA) | Italy | 46h 25' 45" |
| 2 | Nello Lauredi (FRA) | France | + 0' 20" |
| 3 | Fausto Coppi (ITA) | Italy | + 4' 03" |
| 4 | Alex Close (BEL) | Belgium | + 5' 14" |
| 5 | Andrea Carrea (ITA) | Italy | + 8' 10" |
| 6 | Gino Bartali (ITA) | Italy | + 10' 59" |
| 7 | Stan Ockers (BEL) | Belgium | + 12' 26" |
| 8 | Bernardo Ruiz (ESP) | Spain | + 14' 31" |
| 9 | Raphaël Géminiani (FRA) MG | France | + 15' 37" |
| 10 | Gottfried Weilenmann (SUI) | Switzerland | + 17' 13" |

== Stage 9 ==
3 July 1952 — Mulhouse to Lausanne (Switzerland), 238 km (148 mi)

Stage 9 result
| Rank | Rider | Team | Time |
|---|---|---|---|
| 1 | Walter Diggelmann (SUI) | Switzerland | 7h 23' 16" |
| 2 | Jacques Marinelli (FRA) | Paris | s.t. |
| 3 | Jan Nolten (NED) | Netherlands | s.t. |
| 4 | Thijs Roks (NED) | Netherlands | s.t. |
| 5 | Alois De Hertog (BEL) | Belgium | s.t. |
| 6 | Raoul Rémy (FRA) | France | s.t. |
| 7 | Andrea Carrea (ITA) | Italy | s.t. |
| 8 | Ahmed Kebaili (FRA) | North Africa | s.t. |
| 9 | Alfredo Martini (ITA) | Italy | + 6' 15" |
| 10 | Stan Ockers (BEL) | Belgium | + 9' 11" |

General classification after stage 9
| Rank | Rider | Team | Time |
|---|---|---|---|
| 1 | Andrea Carrea (ITA) | Italy | 53h 57' 11" |
| 2 | Fiorenzo Magni (ITA) | Italy | + 1' 01" |
| 3 | Nello Lauredi (FRA) | France | + 1' 21" |
| 4 | Fausto Coppi (ITA) | Italy | + 5' 04" |
| 5 | Alex Close (BEL) | Belgium | + 6' 15" |
| 6 | Gino Bartali (ITA) | Italy | + 12' 00" |
| 7 | Alois De Hertog (BEL) | Belgium | + 13' 20" |
| 8 | Stan Ockers (BEL) | Belgium | + 13' 27" |
| 9 | Bernardo Ruiz (ESP) | Spain | + 15' 32" |
| 10 | Raphaël Géminiani (FRA) MG | France | + 16' 38" |

== Stage 10 ==
4 July 1952 — Lausanne (Switzerland) to L'Alpe d'Huez, 266 km (165 mi)

Stage 10 result
| Rank | Rider | Team | Time |
|---|---|---|---|
| 1 | Fausto Coppi (ITA) | Italy | 8h 51' 40" |
| 2 | Jean Robic (FRA) | France | + 1' 20" |
| 3 | Stan Ockers (BEL) | Belgium | + 3' 22" |
| 4 | Antonio Gelabert (ESP) | Spain | s.t. |
| 5 | Jean Dotto (FRA) | France | + 3' 27" |
| 6 | Andrea Carrea (ITA) | Italy | + 3' 29" |
| 7 | Pierre Molinéris (FRA) | South-East | + 4' 00" |
| 8 | Jan Nolten (NED) | Netherlands | + 4' 02" |
| 9 | Fiorenzo Magni (ITA) | Italy | + 4' 13" |
| 10 | Alex Close (BEL) | Belgium | + 4' 15" |

General classification after stage 10
| Rank | Rider | Team | Time |
|---|---|---|---|
| 1 | Fausto Coppi (ITA) | Italy | 62h 52' 15" |
| 2 | Andrea Carrea (ITA) | Italy | + 0' 05" |
| 3 | Fiorenzo Magni (ITA) | Italy | + 1' 50" |
| 4 | Nello Lauredi (FRA) | France | + 5' 01" |
| 5 | Alex Close (BEL) | Belgium | + 7' 06" |
| 6 | Stan Ockers (BEL) | Belgium | + 13' 25" |
| 7 | Gino Bartali (ITA) | Italy | + 13' 57" |
| 8 | Alois De Hertog (BEL) | Belgium | + 16' 12" |
| 9 | Bernardo Ruiz (ESP) | Spain | + 16' 25" |
| 10 | Jean Robic (FRA) | France | + 18' 17" |

== Stage 11 ==
6 July 1952 — Le Bourg d'Oisans to Sestriere (Italy), 182 km (113 mi)

Stage 11 result
| Rank | Rider | Team | Time |
|---|---|---|---|
| 1 | Fausto Coppi (ITA) | Italy | 6h 36' 59" |
| 2 | Bernardo Ruiz (ESP) | Spain | + 7' 09" |
| 3 | Stan Ockers (BEL) | Belgium | + 9' 33" |
| 4 | Jean Le Guilly (FRA) | West/South-West | + 9' 56" |
| 5 | Gino Bartali (ITA) | Italy | + 10' 09" |
| 6 | Alex Close (BEL) | Belgium | + 10' 11" |
| 7 | Jean Robic (FRA) | France | + 11' 24" |
| 8 | Pierre Molinéris (FRA) | South-East | + 14' 45" |
| 9 | Gottfried Weilenmann (SUI) | Switzerland | + 14' 46" |
| 10 | Wout Wagtmans (NED) | Netherlands | + 15' 39" |

General classification after stage 11
| Rank | Rider | Team | Time |
|---|---|---|---|
| 1 | Fausto Coppi (ITA) MG | Italy | 69h 26' 34" |
| 2 | Alex Close (BEL) | Belgium | + 19' 57" |
| 3 | Andrea Carrea (ITA) | Italy | + 20' 26" |
| 4 | Fiorenzo Magni (ITA) | Italy | + 25' 16" |
| 5 | Bernardo Ruiz (ESP) | Spain | + 25' 24" |
| 6 | Stan Ockers (BEL) | Belgium | + 25' 38" |
| 7 | Gino Bartali (ITA) | Italy | + 26' 46" |
| 8 | Nello Lauredi (FRA) | France | + 31' 21" |
| 9 | Jean Robic (FRA) | France | + 32' 21" |
| 10 | Alois De Hertog (BEL) | Belgium | + 34' 41" |

== Stage 12 ==
7 July 1952 — Sestriere (Italy) to Monaco, 251 km (156 mi)

Stage 12 result
| Rank | Rider | Team | Time |
|---|---|---|---|
| 1 | Jan Nolten (NED) | Netherlands | 8h 13' 19" |
| 2 | Jean Dotto (FRA) | France | + 1' 27" |
| 3 | Pierre Molinéris (FRA) | South-East | + 3' 44" |
| 4 | Jean Bertaina (FRA) | South-East | + 5' 07" |
| 5 | Alois De Hertog (BEL) | Belgium | + 6' 42" |
| 6 | Stan Ockers (BEL) | Belgium | + 6' 48" |
| 7 | Jean Robic (FRA) | France | s.t. |
| 8 | Gino Bartali (ITA) | Italy | + 6' 59" |
| 9 | Fausto Coppi (ITA) MG | Italy | s.t. |
| 10 | Antonio Gelabert (ESP) | Spain | s.t. |

General classification after stage 12
| Rank | Rider | Team | Time |
|---|---|---|---|
| 1 | Fausto Coppi (ITA) MG | Italy | 77h 46' 52" |
| 2 | Alex Close (BEL) | Belgium | + 24' 02" |
| 3 | Bernardo Ruiz (ESP) | Spain | + 25' 26" |
| 4 | Stan Ockers (BEL) | Belgium | + 25' 27" |
| 5 | Fiorenzo Magni (ITA) | Italy | + 26' 04" |
| 6 | Gino Bartali (ITA) | Italy | + 26' 46" |
| 7 | Andrea Carrea (ITA) | Italy | + 30' 16" |
| 8 | Jean Robic (FRA) | France | + 31' 50" |
| 9 | Pierre Molinéris (FRA) | South-East | + 33' 48" |
| 10 | Alois De Hertog (BEL) | Belgium | + 34' 24" |
