= 1952 Tour de France, Stage 13 to Stage 23 =

Cycling race stages

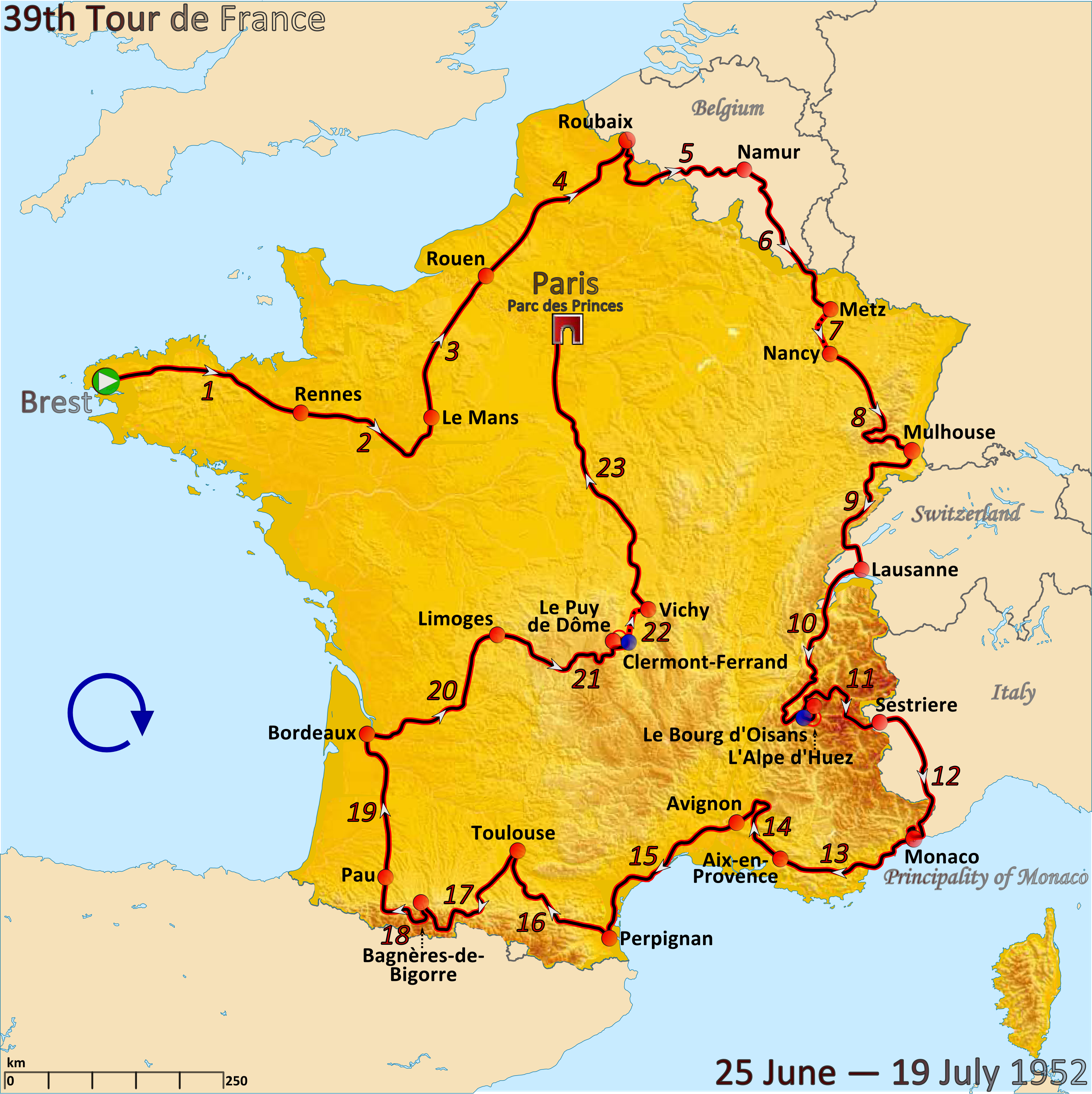
Route of the 1952 Tour de France; followed clockwise, starting in Brest and finishing in Paris

The 1952 Tour de France was the 39th edition of the Tour de France, taking place from 25 June to 19 July. It was composed of 23 stages over 4,807 km (2,987 mi).

The Tour began in Brest on 25 June, and Stage 13 occurred on 8 July with a flat stage to Aix-en-Provence. The race finished in Paris on 19 July.

== Classification standings ==
Legend (Note: Jerseys appearing in the table on the left of the page indicate those worn by the cyclist during the particular stage, while those appearing in the table on the right of the page indicate those awarded to the cyclist after the stage.)
| A yellow jersey | Denotes the leader of the general classification | MG | Denotes the leader of the mountains classification (Note: No jersey was awarded to the leader of the mountains classification until a white jersey with red polka dots was introduced in 1975.) (meilleur grimpeur) |
| | s.t. indicates that the rider was credited with the same time as the one directly above him. | | |

== Stage 13 ==
8 July 1952 — Monaco to Aix-en-Provence, 214 km (133 mi)

Stage 13 result
| Rank | Rider | Team | Time |
|---|---|---|---|
| 1 | Raoul Rémy (FRA) | France | 7h 06' 39" |
| 2 | Jean Dotto (FRA) | France | s.t. |
| 3 | Maurice Quentin (FRA) | France | s.t. |
| 4 | Jacques Vivier (FRA) | West/South-West | + 4' 03" |
| 5 | Tino Sabbadini (FRA) | West/South-West | + 7' 26" |
| 6 | Guy Lapébie (FRA) | West/South-West | s.t. |
| 7 | Stan Ockers (BEL) | Belgium | s.t. |
| 8 | Giovanni Corrieri (ITA) | Italy | s.t. |
| 9 | Marcel Fernandez (FRA) | North Africa | s.t. |
| 10 | Gerrit Voorting (NED) | Netherlands | s.t. |

General classification after stage 13
| Rank | Rider | Team | Time |
|---|---|---|---|
| 1 | Fausto Coppi (ITA) MG | Italy | 85h 00' 57" |
| 2 | Alex Close (BEL) | Belgium | + 24' 02" |
| 3 | Bernardo Ruiz (ESP) | Spain | + 25' 26" |
| 4 | Stan Ockers (BEL) | Belgium | + 25' 27" |
| 5 | Fiorenzo Magni (ITA) | Italy | + 26' 04" |
| 6 | Gino Bartali (ITA) | Italy | + 26' 46" |
| 7 | Jean Dotto (FRA) | France | + 27' 37" |
| 8 | Andrea Carrea (ITA) | Italy | + 30' 16" |
| 9 | Jean Robic (FRA) | France | + 31' 50" |
| 10 | Pierre Molinéris (FRA) | South-East | + 33' 48" |

== Stage 14 ==
9 July 1952 — Aix-en-Provence to Avignon, 178 km (111 mi)

Stage 14 result
| Rank | Rider | Team | Time |
|---|---|---|---|
| 1 | Jean Robic (FRA) | France | 6h 16' 49" |
| 2 | Gino Bartali (ITA) | Italy | + 1' 37" |
| 3 | Raphaël Géminiani (FRA) | France | s.t. |
| 4 | Stan Ockers (BEL) | Belgium | s.t. |
| 5 | Wout Wagtmans (NED) | Netherlands | s.t. |
| 6 | Antonio Gelabert (ESP) | Spain | s.t. |
| 7 | Fausto Coppi (ITA) MG | Italy | s.t. |
| 8 | Jean Dotto (FRA) | France | s.t. |
| 9 | Fiorenzo Magni (ITA) | Italy | + 3' 18" |
| 10 | Gottfried Weilenmann (SUI) | Switzerland | s.t. |

General classification after stage 14
| Rank | Rider | Team | Time |
|---|---|---|---|
| 1 | Fausto Coppi (ITA) MG | Italy | 91h 19' 22" |
| 2 | Stan Ockers (BEL) | Belgium | + 25' 27" |
| 3 | Gino Bartali (ITA) | Italy | + 26' 16" |
| 4 | Alex Close (BEL) | Belgium | + 26' 22" |
| 5 | Jean Dotto (FRA) | France | + 27' 37" |
| 6 | Fiorenzo Magni (ITA) | Italy | + 27' 46" |
| 7 | Bernardo Ruiz (ESP) | Spain | + 28' 22" |
| 8 | Jean Robic (FRA) | France | + 28' 34" |
| 9 | Andrea Carrea (ITA) | Italy | + 36' 56" |
| 10 | Pierre Molinéris (FRA) | South-East | + 40' 28" |

== Stage 15 ==
10 July 1952 — Avignon to Perpignan, 255 km (158 mi)

Stage 15 result
| Rank | Rider | Team | Time |
|---|---|---|---|
| 1 | Georges Decaux (FRA) | Paris | 7h 07' 16" |
| 2 | Giovanni Corrieri (ITA) | Italy | + 8' 53" |
| 3 | Ahmed Kebaili (FRA) | North Africa | + 18' 34" |
| 4 | Henk Faanhof (NED) | Netherlands | + 24' 31" |
| 5 | José Pérez Llácer (ESP) | Spain | + 24' 32" |
| 6 | Johny Goedert (LUX) | Luxembourg/Australia | + 24' 36" |
| 7 | Tino Sabbadini (FRA) | West/South-West | + 24' 39" |
| 8 | Jacques Marinelli (FRA) | Paris | s.t. |
| 9 | Antonin Rolland (FRA) | France | s.t. |
| 10 | Henri Paret (FRA) | North Africa | s.t. |

General classification after stage 15
| Rank | Rider | Team | Time |
|---|---|---|---|
| 1 | Fausto Coppi (ITA) MG | Italy | 98h 51' 17" |
| 2 | Stan Ockers (BEL) | Belgium | + 25' 27" |
| 3 | Gino Bartali (ITA) | Italy | + 26' 16" |
| 4 | Alex Close (BEL) | Belgium | + 26' 22" |
| 5 | Jean Dotto (FRA) | France | + 27' 37" |
| 6 | Fiorenzo Magni (ITA) | Italy | + 27' 46" |
| 7 | Bernardo Ruiz (ESP) | Spain | + 28' 22" |
| 8 | Jean Robic (FRA) | France | + 28' 34" |
| 9 | Andrea Carrea (ITA) | Italy | + 36' 56" |
| 10 | Pierre Molinéris (FRA) | South-East | + 40' 28" |

== Stage 16 ==
11 July 1952 — Perpignan to Toulouse, 200 km (120 mi)

Stage 16 result
| Rank | Rider | Team | Time |
|---|---|---|---|
| 1 | André Rosseel (BEL) | Belgium | 6h 53' 52" |
| 2 | Jacques Vivier (FRA) | West/South-West | s.t. |
| 3 | Mario Baroni (ITA) | Italy | s.t. |
| 4 | Siro Bianchi (ITA) | South-East | s.t. |
| 5 | Jacques Marinelli (FRA) | Paris | s.t. |
| 6 | Lucien Teisseire (FRA) | France | s.t. |
| 7 | Henri Paret (FRA) | North Africa | s.t. |
| 8 | Eugène Telotte (FRA) | Paris | s.t. |
| 9 | Jean Goldschmit (LUX) | Luxembourg/Australia | s.t. |
| 10 | Alois De Hertog (BEL) | Belgium | s.t. |

General classification after stage 16
| Rank | Rider | Team | Time |
|---|---|---|---|
| 1 | Fausto Coppi (ITA) MG | Italy | 105h 46' 56" |
| 2 | Stan Ockers (BEL) | Belgium | + 25' 27" |
| 3 | Alex Close (BEL) | Belgium | + 25' 53" |
| 4 | Gino Bartali (ITA) | Italy | + 26' 16" |
| 5 | Jean Dotto (FRA) | France | + 27' 37" |
| 6 | Fiorenzo Magni (ITA) | Italy | + 27' 46" |
| 7 | Bernardo Ruiz (ESP) | Spain | + 28' 22" |
| 8 | Jean Robic (FRA) | France | + 28' 34" |
| 9 | Andrea Carrea (ITA) | Italy | + 36' 56" |
| 10 | Alois De Hertog (BEL) | Belgium | + 39' 17" |

== Stage 17 ==
13 July 1952 — Toulouse to Bagnères-de-Bigorre, 204 km (127 mi)

Stage 17 result
| Rank | Rider | Team | Time |
|---|---|---|---|
| 1 | Raphaël Géminiani (FRA) | France | 6h 43' 16" |
| 2 | Antonin Rolland (FRA) | France | + 1' 14" |
| 3 | Stan Ockers (BEL) | Belgium | s.t. |
| 4 | Gino Bartali (ITA) | Italy | s.t. |
| 5 | Fausto Coppi (ITA) MG | Italy | s.t. |
| 6 | Jan Nolten (NED) | Netherlands | s.t. |
| 7 | Jean Robic (FRA) | France | s.t. |
| 8 | Jean Le Guilly (FRA) | West/South-West | s.t. |
| 9 | Alois De Hertog (BEL) | Belgium | s.t. |
| 10 | Alex Close (BEL) | Belgium | s.t. |

General classification after stage 17
| Rank | Rider | Team | Time |
|---|---|---|---|
| 1 | Fausto Coppi (ITA) MG | Italy | 112h 31' 26" |
| 2 | Stan Ockers (BEL) | Belgium | + 25' 27" |
| 3 | Gino Bartali (ITA) | Italy | + 26' 16" |
| 4 | Alex Close (BEL) | Belgium | + 26' 22" |
| 5 | Jean Dotto (FRA) | France | + 27' 37" |
| 6 | Bernardo Ruiz (ESP) | Spain | + 28' 22" |
| 7 | Jean Robic (FRA) | France | + 28' 34" |
| 8 | Fiorenzo Magni (ITA) | Italy | + 31' 04" |
| 9 | Andrea Carrea (ITA) | Italy | + 36' 56" |
| 10 | Alois De Hertog (BEL) | Belgium | + 39' 17" |

== Stage 18 ==
14 July 1952 — Bagnères-de-Bigorre to Pau, 149 km (93 mi)

Stage 18 result
| Rank | Rider | Team | Time |
|---|---|---|---|
| 1 | Fausto Coppi (ITA) MG | Italy | 4h 42' 04" |
| 2 | Stan Ockers (BEL) | Belgium | + 0' 04" |
| 3 | Jean Robic (FRA) | France | s.t. |
| 4 | Bernardo Ruiz (ESP) | Spain | + 0' 07" |
| 5 | Gilbert Bauvin (FRA) | North-East/Centre | + 0' 11" |
| 6 | Antonio Gelabert (ESP) | Spain | + 4' 13" |
| 7 | Jan Nolten (NED) | Netherlands | s.t. |
| 8 | Adolphe Deledda (FRA) | North-East/Centre | s.t. |
| 9 | Jean de Gribaldy (FRA) | North-East/Centre | s.t. |
| 10 | Edward Van Ende (BEL) | Belgium | s.t. |

General classification after stage 18
| Rank | Rider | Team | Time |
|---|---|---|---|
| 1 | Fausto Coppi (ITA) MG | Italy | 117h 11' 10" |
| 2 | Stan Ockers (BEL) | Belgium | + 27' 01" |
| 3 | Jean Robic (FRA) | France | + 30' 37" |
| 4 | Bernardo Ruiz (ESP) | Spain | + 30' 49" |
| 5 | Gino Bartali (ITA) | Italy | + 32' 49" |
| 6 | Alex Close (BEL) | Belgium | + 32' 55" |
| 7 | Jean Dotto (FRA) | France | + 37' 26" |
| 8 | Fiorenzo Magni (ITA) | Italy | + 37' 37" |
| 9 | Andrea Carrea (ITA) | Italy | + 49' 43" |
| 10 | Alois De Hertog (BEL) | Belgium | + 52' 04" |

== Stage 19 ==
15 July 1952 — Pau to Bordeaux, 195 km (121 mi)

Stage 19 result
| Rank | Rider | Team | Time |
|---|---|---|---|
| 1 | Hans Dekkers (NED) | Netherlands | 5h 15' 16" |
| 2 | Gerrit Voorting (NED) | Netherlands | + 0' 09" |
| 3 | Pierre Pardoën (FRA) | North-East/Centre | s.t. |
| 4 | Henk Faanhof (NED) | Netherlands | + 1' 45" |
| 5 | Vincent Vitetta (FRA) | South-East | s.t. |
| 6 | Paul Giguet (FRA) | South-East | s.t. |
| 7 | André Rosseel (BEL) | Belgium | s.t. |
| 8 | Tino Sabbadini (FRA) | West/South-West | s.t. |
| 9 | Marcel Fernandez (FRA) | North Africa | s.t. |
| 10 | Ahmed Kebaili (FRA) | North Africa | s.t. |

General classification after stage 19
| Rank | Rider | Team | Time |
|---|---|---|---|
| 1 | Fausto Coppi (ITA) MG | Italy | 122h 33' 31" |
| 2 | Stan Ockers (BEL) | Belgium | + 27' 01" |
| 3 | Jean Robic (FRA) | France | + 30' 37" |
| 4 | Bernardo Ruiz (ESP) | Spain | + 30' 49" |
| 5 | Gino Bartali (ITA) | Italy | + 32' 49" |
| 6 | Alex Close (BEL) | Belgium | + 32' 55" |
| 7 | Jean Dotto (FRA) | France | + 37' 26" |
| 8 | Fiorenzo Magni (ITA) | Italy | + 37' 37" |
| 9 | Alois De Hertog (BEL) | Belgium | + 48' 33" |
| 10 | Andrea Carrea (ITA) | Italy | + 49' 43" |

== Stage 20 ==
16 July 1952 — Bordeaux to Limoges, 228 km (142 mi)

Stage 20 result
| Rank | Rider | Team | Time |
|---|---|---|---|
| 1 | Jacques Vivier (FRA) | West/South-West | 6h 32' 48" |
| 2 | Wim van Est (NED) | Netherlands | + 0' 06" |
| 3 | Georges Decaux (FRA) | Paris | s.t. |
| 4 | Jacques Renaud (FRA) | Paris | s.t. |
| 5 | Ahmed Kebaili (FRA) | North Africa | + 2' 53" |
| 6 | Stan Ockers (BEL) | Belgium | + 3' 01" |
| 7 | Jean Goldschmit (LUX) | Luxembourg/Australia | s.t. |
| 8 | Henk Faanhof (NED) | Netherlands | s.t. |
| 9 | André Rosseel (BEL) | Belgium | s.t. |
| 10 | Francisco Masip (ESP) | Spain | s.t. |

General classification after stage 20
| Rank | Rider | Team | Time |
|---|---|---|---|
| 1 | Fausto Coppi (ITA) MG | Italy | 129h 09' 20" |
| 2 | Stan Ockers (BEL) | Belgium | + 27' 01" |
| 3 | Jean Robic (FRA) | France | + 30' 37" |
| 4 | Bernardo Ruiz (ESP) | Spain | + 30' 49" |
| 5 | Gino Bartali (ITA) | Italy | + 32' 49" |
| 6 | Alex Close (BEL) | Belgium | + 32' 35" |
| 7 | Jean Dotto (FRA) | France | + 37' 26" |
| 8 | Fiorenzo Magni (ITA) | Italy | + 37' 37" |
| 9 | Alois De Hertog (BEL) | Belgium | + 48' 33" |
| 10 | Andrea Carrea (ITA) | Italy | + 49' 43" |

== Stage 21 ==
17 July 1952 — Limoges to Puy de Dôme, 245 km (152 mi)

Stage 21 result
| Rank | Rider | Team | Time |
|---|---|---|---|
| 1 | Fausto Coppi (ITA) MG | Italy | 9h 40' 51" |
| 2 | Jan Nolten (NED) | Netherlands | + 0' 10" |
| 3 | Gino Bartali (ITA) | Italy | + 0' 31" |
| 4 | Raphaël Géminiani (FRA) | France | + 0' 46" |
| 5 | Andrea Carrea (ITA) | Italy | + 0' 51" |
| 6 | Jean Robic (FRA) | France | + 1' 13" |
| 7 | Antonio Gelabert (ESP) | Spain | + 1' 39" |
| 8 | Jean de Gribaldy (FRA) | North-East/Centre | + 2' 25" |
| 9 | Wout Wagtmans (NED) | Netherlands | + 2' 32" |
| 10 | Stan Ockers (BEL) | Belgium | + 2' 33" |

General classification after stage 21
| Rank | Rider | Team | Time |
|---|---|---|---|
| 1 | Fausto Coppi (ITA) MG | Italy | 138h 48' 31" |
| 2 | Stan Ockers (BEL) | Belgium | + 31' 44" |
| 3 | Jean Robic (FRA) | France | + 33' 30" |
| 4 | Gino Bartali (ITA) | Italy | + 35' 00" |
| 5 | Bernardo Ruiz (ESP) | Spain | + 35' 53" |
| 6 | Alex Close (BEL) | Belgium | + 39' 01" |
| 7 | Fiorenzo Magni (ITA) | Italy | + 42' 24" |
| 8 | Jean Dotto (FRA) | France | + 45' 50" |
| 9 | Andrea Carrea (ITA) | Italy | + 52' 14" |
| 10 | Antonio Gelabert (ESP) | Spain | + 56' 00" |

== Stage 22 ==
18 July 1952 — Clermont-Ferrand to Vichy, 63 km (39 mi) (ITT)

Stage 22 result
| Rank | Rider | Team | Time |
|---|---|---|---|
| 1 | Fiorenzo Magni (ITA) | Italy | 1h 33' 11" |
| 2 | Stan Ockers (BEL) | Belgium | + 0' 02" |
| 3 | Andrea Carrea (ITA) | Italy | + 1' 05" |
| 4 | Giovanni Corrieri (ITA) | Italy | + 1' 07" |
| 5 | Wim van Est (NED) | Netherlands | + 1' 20" |
| 6 | Lucien Teisseire (FRA) | France | + 1' 33" |
| 7 | Ahmed Kebaili (FRA) | North Africa | + 1' 35" |
| 8 | Bernardo Ruiz (ESP) | Spain | + 1' 44" |
| 9 | Roger Decock (BEL) | Belgium | + 1' 48" |
| 10 | Alex Close (BEL) | Belgium | + 2' 30" |

General classification after stage 22
| Rank | Rider | Team | Time |
|---|---|---|---|
| 1 | Fausto Coppi (ITA) MG | Italy | 140h 24' 41" |
| 2 | Stan Ockers (BEL) | Belgium | + 28' 17" |
| 3 | Bernardo Ruiz (ESP) | Spain | + 34' 38" |
| 4 | Gino Bartali (ITA) | Italy | + 35' 25" |
| 5 | Jean Robic (FRA) | France | + 35' 36" |
| 6 | Fiorenzo Magni (ITA) | Italy | + 38' 25" |
| 7 | Alex Close (BEL) | Belgium | + 38' 32" |
| 8 | Jean Dotto (FRA) | France | + 48' 01" |
| 9 | Andrea Carrea (ITA) | Italy | + 50' 20" |
| 10 | Antonio Gelabert (ESP) | Spain | + 58' 16" |

== Stage 23 ==
19 July 1952 — Vichy to Paris (Parc des Princes), 354 km (220 mi)

Stage 23 result
| Rank | Rider | Team | Time |
|---|---|---|---|
| 1 | Antonin Rolland (FRA) | France | 11h 28' 55" |
| 2 | Gottfried Weilenmann (SUI) | Switzerland | s.t. |
| 3 | Henk Faanhof (NED) | Netherlands | s.t. |
| 4 | André Rosseel (BEL) | Belgium | s.t. |
| 5 | Adolphe Deledda (FRA) | North-East/Centre | s.t. |
| 6 | Jean Goldschmit (LUX) | Luxembourg/Australia | s.t. |
| 7 | Jean Delahaye (FRA) | West/South-West | s.t. |
| 8 | Luciano Pezzi (ITA) | Italy | s.t. |
| 9 | Raoul Rémy (FRA) | France | s.t. |
| 10 | Pierre Pardoën (FRA) | North-East/Centre | s.t. |

General classification after stage 23
| Rank | Rider | Team | Time |
|---|---|---|---|
| 1 | Fausto Coppi (ITA) MG | Italy | 151h 57' 20" |
| 2 | Stan Ockers (BEL) | Belgium | + 28' 17" |
| 3 | Bernardo Ruiz (ESP) | Spain | + 34' 38" |
| 4 | Gino Bartali (ITA) | Italy | + 35' 25" |
| 5 | Jean Robic (FRA) | France | + 35' 36" |
| 6 | Fiorenzo Magni (ITA) | Italy | + 38' 25" |
| 7 | Alex Close (BEL) | Belgium | + 38' 32" |
| 8 | Jean Dotto (FRA) | France | + 48' 01" |
| 9 | Andrea Carrea (ITA) | Italy | + 50' 20" |
| 10 | Antonio Gelabert (ESP) | Spain | + 58' 16" |
