= Neyt =

Neyt may refer to:

== People ==
- Adolphe Neyt (1830–1892), Belgian industrialist, amateur photographer, and weapons collector
- Bernard Neyt (1825–1880), Belgian painter
- Georges Neyt (1842–1910), Belgian diplomat
- Herman de Neyt (1588–1642), Flemish Baroque painter and art dealer
- Maurice Neyt (1928–2006), Belgian racing cyclist
- Pieter Johannes Neyt (1839–1900), Dutch engineer

== Places ==
- Neyt Point, a point in the Palmer Archipelago, Antarctica

== See also ==
- Annemie Neyts (born 1944), Belgian politician
