= Hans Dekkers =

Hans Dekkers may refer to:

- Hans Dekkers (cyclist, born 1928), Dutch cyclist
- Hans Dekkers (cyclist, born 1981), Dutch cyclist who rode for Garmin-Slipstream in 2009
