= 1953 GP Ouest-France =

Race details
- Dates: 31 August 1953
- Stages: 1
- Distance: 180 km (111.8 mi)
- Winning time: 4h 43' 00"

Results
	Winner	Serge Blusson (FRA)
	Second	Louis Gillet (FRA)
	Third	Raymond Scardin (FRA)

The 1953 GP Ouest-France was the 17th edition of the GP Ouest-France cycle race and was held on 31 August 1953. The race started and finished in Plouay. The race was won by Serge Blusson.

== General classification ==
Final general classification

Rank	Rider	Time
1	Serge Blusson (FRA)	4h 43' 00"
2	Louis Gillet (FRA)	+ 0"
3	Raymond Scardin (FRA)	+ 0"
4	Lucien Guguin (FRA)	+ 0"
5	Raymond Guégan (FRA)	+ 0"
6	Jean Baldassari (FRA)	+ 0"
7	Joseph Le Cadet (FRA)	+ 0"
8	Jahier (FRA)	+ 0"
9	Pierre Barbotin (FRA)	+ 0"
10	Édouard Muller (FRA)	+ 0"
