= Alexandre Sowa =

French cyclist

Personal information
- Born: 8 April 1927
- Died: 21 June 2017 (aged 90)

Cycling career
- Sport: Cycling
- Role: Rider

Alexandre Sowa (8 April 1927 – 21 June 2017) was a French racing cyclist. He rode in the 1952 Tour de France.
