= Gérard Guercy =

Algerian cyclist

Personal information
- Born: 16 April 1925
- Died: 30 May 2009 (aged 84)

Cycling career
- Sport: Cycling
- Role: Rider

Gérard Guercy (16 April 1925 – 30 May 2009) was an Algerian racing cyclist. He rode in the 1952 Tour de France.
