= Mustapha Chareuf =

Algerian cyclist

Personal information
- Full name: Mustapha Chareuf-Afghoul
- Born: 18 May 1925 Hammam Bou Hadjar, French Algeria
- Died: 18 September 1957 (aged 32) Aïn El Arbaa, French Algeria

Cycling career
- Sport: Cycling
- Role: Rider

Professional team
- 1952: Terrot-Hutchinson

Mustapha Chareuf (18 May 1925 – 18 September 1957) was an Algerian racing cyclist and militant for the National Liberation Front (FLN) during the Algerian War for independence. As a cyclist he rode in the 1952 Tour de France.

Mustapha Chareuf-Afghoul was born on May 18, 1925 in Hammam Bou Hadjar, in French Algeria. He began his cycling career in his native land, obtaining good results in local races.

In 1952, he rode professionally in the French Terrot-Hutchinson team. Later that year, in July, he was one of the cyclists selected for the North African team to participate in the Tour de France. However, he did not make the time limit during the first stage.

He died during the Algerian War in Aïn El Arbaa, in a clash with the French army. Although announced as having died on June 18, 1956, it is more likely that he died, according to his burial, on September 18, 1957.
