= Albert Chaumarat =

French cyclist

Personal information
- Born: 8 July 1925 Chambon-Feugerolles
- Died: 1 November 2013 (aged 86)

Cycling career
- Sport: Cycling
- Role: Rider

Albert Chaumarat (8 July 1925 – 1 November 2013) was a French racing cyclist. He rode in the 1952 Tour de France.
