= Pierre Gaudot =

French cyclist (1928–2023)

Personal information
- Born: 2 April 1928 Paris, France
- Died: 29 May 2023 (aged 95)

Cycling career
- Sport: Cycling
- Role: Rider

Pierre Gaudot (2 April 1928 – 29 May 2023) was a French racing cyclist. He rode in the 1952 Tour de France.

Gaudot died on 29 May 2023, at the age of 95.
