= 1952 Tour de France =

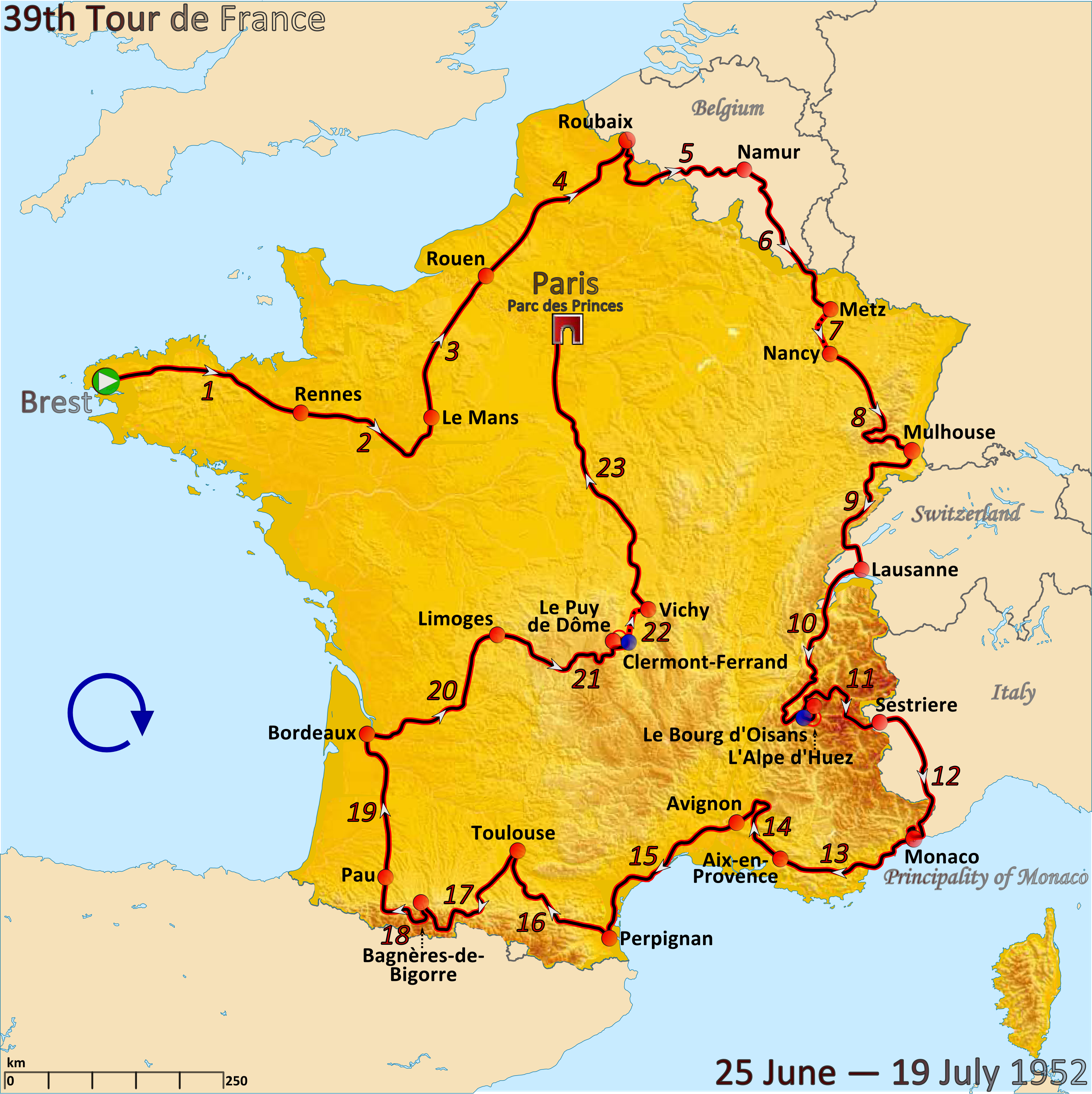
- Route of the 1952 Tour de France followed clockwise, starting in Brest and finishing in Paris

Race details
- Dates: 25 June – 19 July 1952
- Stages: 23
- Distance: 4,807 km (2,987 mi)
- Winning time: 151h 57' 20"

Results
Jersey awarded to the overall winner	Winner	Fausto Coppi (ITA)	(Italy)
	Second	Stan Ockers (BEL)	(Belgium)
	Third	Bernardo Ruiz (ESP)	(Spain)
	Mountains	Fausto Coppi (ITA)	(Italy)
	Team	Italy	

The 1952 Tour de France was the 39th edition of the Tour de France, taking place from 25 June to 19 July. It was composed of 23 stages over 4,807 km (2,987 mi). Newly introduced were the arrivals on mountain peaks.

The race was won by Italian Fausto Coppi. Coppi dominated the race, winning five stages and the mountains classification, and was a member of the winning Italian team. His dominance was so large that the Tour organisation had to double the prize money for second place to make the race interesting. At the end, Coppi had a margin of almost half an hour over the second-ranked cyclist; such a margin has never been achieved again. Although more than 25 years later during the 1979 edition, the 1st and 2nd-place finishers Bernard Hinault and Joop Zoetemelk were both nearly a half hour ahead of the 3rd-place finisher.

== Teams ==
As was the custom since the 1930 Tour de France, the 1952 Tour de France was contested by national and regional teams. The three major cycling countries in 1952, Italy, Belgium and France, each sent a team of 12 cyclists. Other countries sent teams of 8 cyclists: Switzerland, Luxembourg (together with Australia), Netherlands and Spain. The French regional cyclists were divided into four teams of 12 cyclists: Paris, North-East/Centre, South-East and West/South-West. The last team of eight cyclists was made up out of cyclists from the French North African colonies. In the end, Luxembourg only sent 6 cyclists, so altogether this made 122 cyclists. There were 57 French (of which 6 were Algerian), 13 Italian, 12 Belgian, 8 Dutch, 8 Spanish, 8 Swiss, 5 Luxembourgian and 1 Australian cyclists.

The teams entering the race were:

- Switzerland
- Belgium
- Italy
- France
- Netherlands
- Spain
- Luxembourg/Australia
- Paris
- North-East/Centre
- South-East
- West/South-West
- North Africa

== Pre-race favourites ==
The winners of the last two editions, Swiss cyclists Hugo Koblet and Ferdinand Kübler, were injured and did not enter the race, nor did French cyclist Louison Bobet. On the last press conference before the race, Jacques Goddet conducted a poll amongst journalists to see who they considered the favourite. Coppi received 29 votes in that poll, followed by Géminiani and Bartali, both with 26 votes.

== Route and stages ==
The final stage was from Vichy, the capital of Vichy France in the Second World War, to Paris. Vichy had never before been visited, and the distance from Vichy to Paris was significantly longer than the other stages. A newspaper described it as linking the two cities together. The stop in Vichy was successful, with a new record of 150.000 live spectators. An innovation was the stage arrivals on mountain peaks. This happened three times in 1952, on stages 10, 11 and 21. There were two rest days, in Alpe d'Huez and Toulouse. The highest point of elevation in the race was 2,556 m (8,386 ft) at the summit tunnel of the Col du Galibier mountain pass on stage 11.

Stage characteristics and winners
Stage	Date	Course	Distance	Type	Winner
1	25 June	Brest to Rennes	246 km (153 mi)	Plain stage	Rik Van Steenbergen (BEL)
2	26 June	Rennes to Le Mans	181 km (112 mi)	Plain stage	André Rosseel (BEL)
3	27 June	Le Mans to Rouen	189 km (117 mi)	Plain stage	Nello Lauredi (FRA)
4	28 June	Rouen to Roubaix	232 km (144 mi)	Plain stage	Pierre Molinéris (FRA)
5	29 June	Roubaix to Namur (Belgium)	197 km (122 mi)	Plain stage	Jean Diederich (LUX)
6	30 June	Namur (Belgium) to Metz	228 km (142 mi)	Plain stage	Fiorenzo Magni (ITA)
7	1 July	Metz to Nancy	60 km (37 mi)	Individual time trial	Fausto Coppi (ITA)
8	2 July	Nancy to Mulhouse	252 km (157 mi)	Stage with mountain(s)	Raphaël Géminiani (FRA)
9	3 July	Mulhouse to Lausanne	238 km (148 mi)	Stage with mountain(s)	Walter Diggelmann (SUI)
10	4 July	Lausanne to Alpe d'Huez	266 km (165 mi)	Stage with mountain(s)	Fausto Coppi (ITA)
	5 July	Alpe d'Huez		Rest day	
11	6 July	Le Bourg-d'Oisans to Sestriere (Italy)	182 km (113 mi)	Stage with mountain(s)	Fausto Coppi (ITA)
12	7 July	Sestriere (Italy) to Monaco	251 km (156 mi)	Stage with mountain(s)	Jan Nolten (NED)
13	8 July	Monaco to Aix-en-Provence	214 km (133 mi)	Plain stage	Raoul Rémy (FRA)
14	9 July	Aix-en-Provence to Avignon	178 km (111 mi)	Stage with mountain(s)	Jean Robic (FRA)
15	10 July	Avignon to Perpignan	255 km (158 mi)	Plain stage	Georges Decaux (FRA)
16	11 July	Perpignan to Toulouse	200 km (124 mi)	Plain stage	André Rosseel (BEL)
	12 July	Toulouse		Rest day	
17	13 July	Toulouse to Bagnères-de-Bigorre	204 km (127 mi)	Stage with mountain(s)	Raphaël Géminiani (FRA)
18	14 July	Bagnères-de-Bigorre to Pau	149 km (93 mi)	Stage with mountain(s)	Fausto Coppi (ITA)
19	15 July	Pau to Bordeaux	195 km (121 mi)	Plain stage	Hans Dekkers (NED)
20	16 July	Bordeaux to Limoges	228 km (142 mi)	Plain stage	Jacques Vivier (FRA)
21	17 July	Limoges to Puy de Dôme	245 km (152 mi)	Stage with mountain(s)	Fausto Coppi (ITA)
22	18 July	Clermont-Ferrand to Vichy	63 km (39 mi)	Individual time trial	Fiorenzo Magni (ITA)
23	19 July	Vichy to Paris	354 km (220 mi)	Plain stage	Antonin Rolland (FRA)
	Total		4,807 km (2,987 mi)		

== Race overview ==
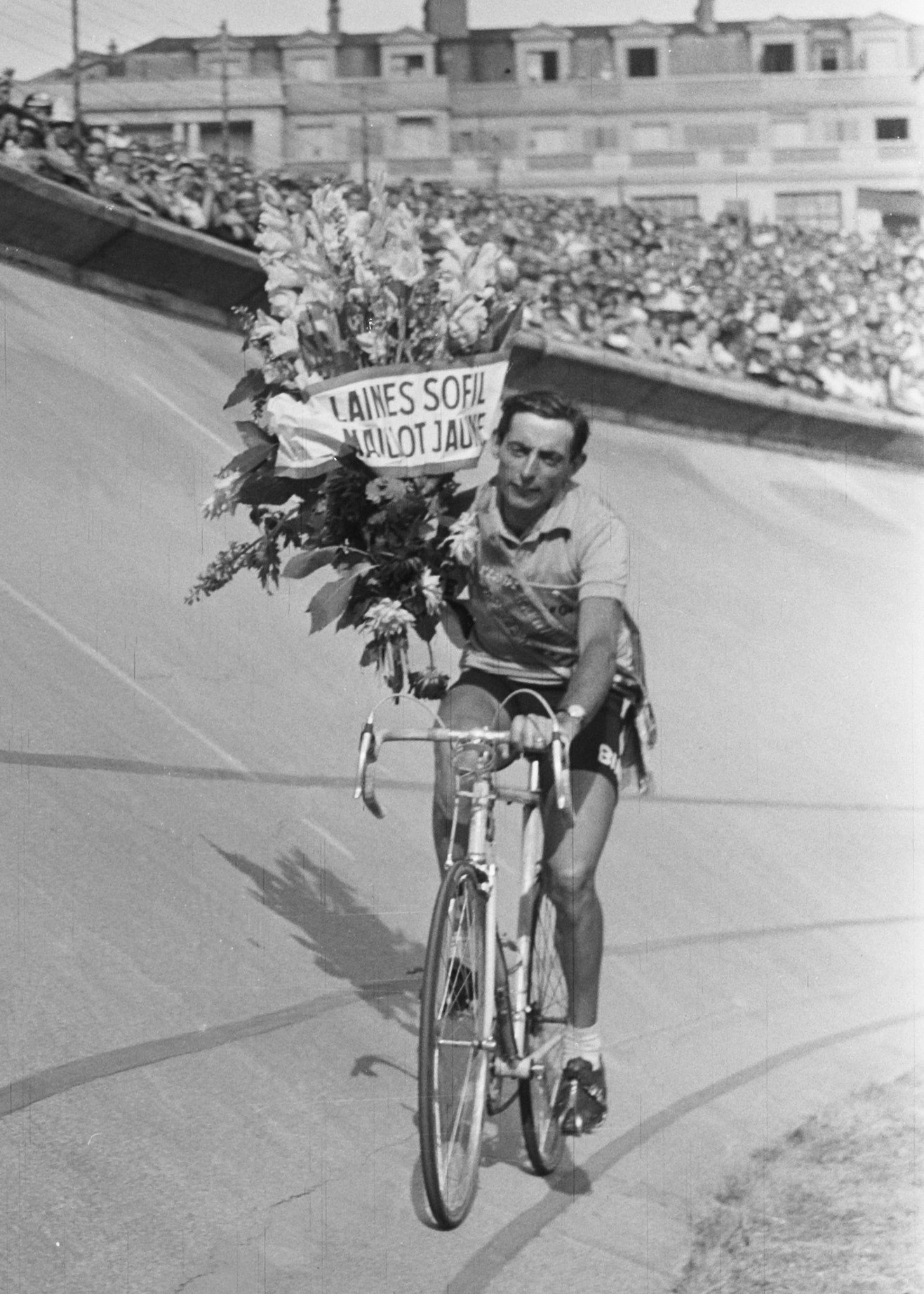
General classification winner Fausto Coppi taking his victory lap at the end of the Tour in the Parc des Princes in Paris

In the fourth stage, Jean Robic, the winner of the 1947 Tour de France was in a group with his teammate Raphaël Géminiani, and Robic let Géminiani do all the work. After the stage, Robic told reporters that he had been smart, because he had saved energy and was in a better position to win the Tour. Géminiani then became angry and held Robic's head in a hotel room sink. It was the last year that Robic rode on the national team. At that moment, Nello Lauredi was the leader in the race.

In the sixth stage, Fiorenzo Magni escaped, and became the leader of the general classification by twelve seconds. In the 1950 Tour de France, Magni had already become the leader, but left the race without riding in the yellow jersey. In the time trial in stage seven, won by Fausto Coppi, Magni lost his lead, and Lauredi became leader again.

The first high mountains appeared in stage eight. Magni and Lauredi stayed together, but because Magni took a twenty-second bonification for finishing second, they swapped positions again, and Magni became leader again.

In the ninth stage, a group of eight cyclists got away, including Coppi's teammate Andrea Carrea. At the end of the stage, the group had a margin of more than nine minutes. Carrea went to the hotel after the finish, but was picked up by the police. Carrea asked what he had done wrong, but he was told that he was the new leader of the race, and had to go to the ceremony to receive the yellow jersey. Carrea apologised to his team leader Coppi, in fear that his team leader would be angry because a helper occupied the highest rank, but Coppi was not angry.

In the tenth stage, Robic attacked, and only Coppi was able to follow him. Later, Robic had a flat tire. Because his team director was far away, he lost several minutes, and lost so much time that he dropped from second place to fifth place. Coppi rode away and won the stage, taking over the lead in the general classification from his teammate. The top three riders were all Italian at that moment.

After the rest day, the eleventh stage was again a mountain stage. The cyclists from the French national team, especially Géminiani, attacked on the Galibier, but Coppi counterattacked and escaped easily. At the end of the stage, Coppi won by a large margin. His lead in the general classification was now almost 20 minutes.

The margin was so large that Coppi didn't need to attack in the twelfth stage. When Coppi had a flat tire, his teammate Gino Bartali gave him his own wheel, which was a sign that the rivalry between the two cyclists was over. Even though Coppi rode conservatively in that stage, the cyclist directly behind him in the general classification, Alex Close, lost another four minutes, and Coppi was now 24 minutes ahead.

The Tour organisation feared that the race would become dull, now that Coppi's lead was so large. Therefore, they doubled the prize money for second and third place, hoping to keep the other cyclists aggressive.

In the sixteenth stage, the riders were apparently not motivated by the double prize money, as they were slow that day. The organisation then responded by canceling the prize money; there was still a rule from before 1947, that said that stage winners had to go at least 30 km/h to win prize money. The winner, André Rosseel, had only reached 29 km/h.

In the seventeenth stage, Géminiani, who was already in fourteenth place, 52 minutes behind in the general classification, escaped. Coppi did not chase him, and allowed Géminiani to win the stage. In the eighteenth stage, Coppi reached the top of the mountains first, but took it easy on the descent, and allowed other cyclists to get back to him. He still won the sprint at the end of the stage.

Coppi also won the last mountain stage, stage 21, and increased his lead to more than 31 minutes. In the time trial on the next day, Coppi apparently took it easy. Previously he was an expert in such time trials, but on that day he allowed other cyclists to win back some time, and finished on the fourteenth place.

== Classification leadership and minor prizes ==
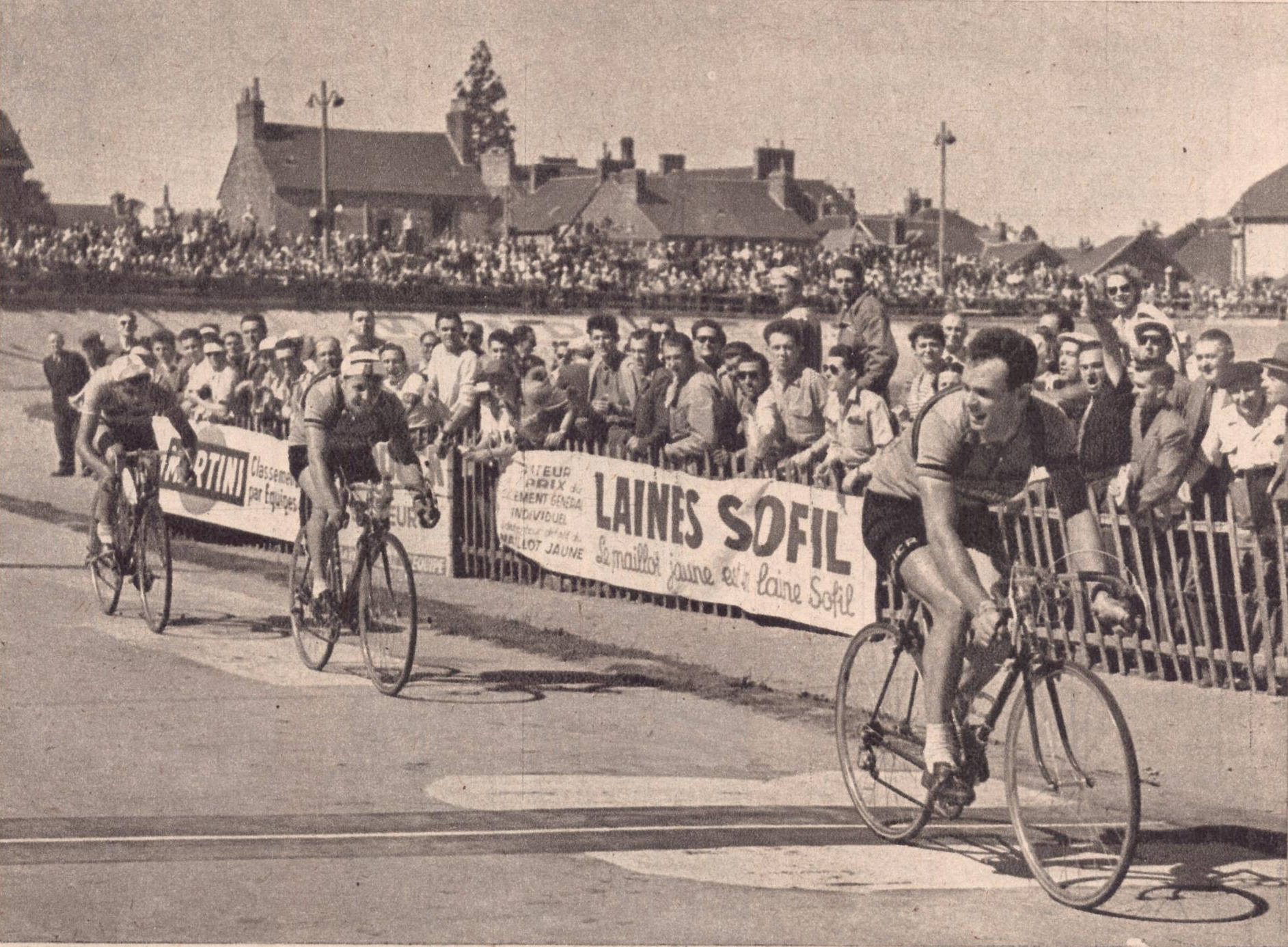
Rik Van Steenbergen, winning the first stage. He would hold the yellow jersey for two days

The time that each cyclist required to finish each stage was recorded, and these times were added together for the general classification. If a cyclist had received a time bonus, it was subtracted from this total; all time penalties were added to this total. The cyclist with the least accumulated time was the race leader, identified by the yellow jersey. Of the 123 cyclists that started the 1951 Tour de France, 66 finished the race.

Points for the mountains classification were earned by reaching the mountain tops first. The system was the same as in 1951: there were three types of mountain tops: the hardest ones, in category 1, gave 10 points to the winner, the easier ones in category 2 gave 6 points to the winner, and the easiest in category 3 gave 3 points. Fausto Coppi won this classification.

The team classification had been awarded and calculated since 1930, but in 1952 the daily team classification was also calculated: for each stage, the best team (calculated as the team of which the best three cyclists had the lowest accumulated team in that stage) received a prize. The riders in the team that led this classification wore yellow caps for the first time in 1952. It was won by the Italian team. The Luxembourgian team finished with only two cyclists, and therefore were not eligible for the team classification.

The 1952 Tour de France saw the introduction of the combativity award, a daily award for the most combative rider of the stage. The winner of that award received 100,000 French francs. The super-combativity award, the award for the most combative rider of the entire Tour de France, was also first given in 1953, determined by a jury vote, to Robic. The Souvenir Henri Desgrange was given to the first rider to pass the memorial to Tour founder Henri Desgrange near the summit of the Col du Galibier stage 11. This prize was won by Fausto Coppi. The special award for the best regional rider was won by eighteenth-placed Marcel Zelasco.

There were also a few minor awards. After every stage, an award was given to the cyclist with the most bad luck, and to the most 'cold-blooded' cyclist. At the end of the Tour the award for the cyclist with the most bad luck was given to Wim van Est. The award for most beloved cyclist was given to Antonin Rolland.

Classification leadership by stage
Stage	Winner	General classification	Mountains classification (Note: No jersey was awarded to the leader of the mountains classification until a white jersey with red polka dots was introduced in 1975.)	Team classification	Combativity award
1	Rik Van Steenbergen	Rik Van Steenbergen	no award	Belgium	Pierre Pardoën
2	André Rosseel	Rik Van Steenbergen	no award	Belgium	Jean Malléjac
3	Nello Lauredi	Nello Lauredi	no award	France	Nello Lauredi
4	Pierre Molinéris	Nello Lauredi	no award	France	Nello Lauredi
5	Jean Diederich	Nello Lauredi	no award	France	Bim Diederich
6	Fiorenzo Magni	Fiorenzo Magni	no award	France	Fiorenzo Magni
7	Fausto Coppi	Nello Lauredi	no award	France	Armand Papazian
8	Raphaël Géminiani	Fiorenzo Magni	Raphaël Géminiani	France	Raphaël Géminiani
9	Walter Diggelmann	Andrea Carrea	Raphaël Géminiani	France	Jan Nolten
10	Fausto Coppi	Fausto Coppi	Antonio Gelabert	France	Fausto Coppi
11	Fausto Coppi	Fausto Coppi	Fausto Coppi	France	Jean Le Guilly
12	Jan Nolten	Fausto Coppi	Fausto Coppi	France	Jan Nolten
13	Raoul Rémy	Fausto Coppi	Fausto Coppi	France	Jean Dotto
14	Jean Robic	Fausto Coppi	Fausto Coppi	France	Jean Robic
15	Georges Decaux	Fausto Coppi	Fausto Coppi	Italy	Georges Decaux
16	André Rosseel	Fausto Coppi	Fausto Coppi	Italy	Wim van Est
17	Raphaël Géminiani	Fausto Coppi	Fausto Coppi	Italy	Raphaël Géminiani
18	Fausto Coppi	Fausto Coppi	Fausto Coppi	Italy	Fausto Coppi
19	Hans Dekkers	Fausto Coppi	Fausto Coppi	Italy	Hans Dekkers
20	Jacques Vivier	Fausto Coppi	Fausto Coppi	Italy	Georges Decaux
21	Fausto Coppi	Fausto Coppi	Fausto Coppi	Italy	no award
22	Fiorenzo Magni	Fausto Coppi	Fausto Coppi	Italy	no award
23	Antonin Rolland	Fausto Coppi	Fausto Coppi	Italy	Jean Robic
Final		Fausto Coppi	Fausto Coppi	Italy	Jean Robic

== Final standings ==
=== General classification ===
Final general classification (1–10)
Rank	Rider	Team	Time
1	Fausto Coppi (ITA)	Italy	151h 57' 20"
2	Stan Ockers (BEL)	Belgium	+ 28' 17"
3	Bernardo Ruiz (ESP)	Spain	+ 34' 38"
4	Gino Bartali (ITA)	Italy	+ 35' 25"
5	Jean Robic (FRA)	France	+ 35' 36"
6	Fiorenzo Magni (ITA)	Italy	+ 38' 25"
7	Alex Close (BEL)	Belgium	+ 38' 32"
8	Jean Dotto (FRA)	France	+ 48' 01"
9	Andrea Carrea (ITA)	Italy	+ 50' 20"
10	Antonio Gelabert (ESP)	Spain	+ 58' 16"

Final general classification (11–66)
Rank	Rider	Team	Time
11	Raphaël Géminiani (FRA)	France	+ 1h 02' 47"
12	Gottfried Weilenmann Jr. (SUI)	Switzerland	+ 1h 04' 19"
13	Aloïs De Hertog (BEL)	Belgium	+ 1h 07' 15"
14	Edward Van Ende (BEL)	Belgium	+ 1h 17' 37"
15	Jan Nolten (NED)	Netherlands	+ 1h 30' 34"
16	Jean Goldschmit (LUX)	Luxembourg	+ 1h 49' 47"
17	Wim van Est (NED)	Netherlands	+ 1h 50' 54"
18	Marcel Zélasco (FRA)	North Africa	+ 1h 51' 02"
19	Nello Lauredi (FRA)	France	+ 1h 59' 43"
20	Vincent Vitetta (FRA)	South-East	+ 2h 01' 17"
21	Antonin Rolland (FRA)	France	+ 2h 02' 38"
22	Gerrit Voorting (NED)	Netherlands	+ 2h 07' 22"
23	José Serra (ESP)	Spain	+ 2h 08' 32"
24	Adolphe Deledda (FRA)	North-East/Centre	+ 2h 09' 44"
25	Wout Wagtmans (NED)	Netherlands	+ 2h 09' 45"
26	Jean Le Guilly (FRA)	West/South-West	+ 2h 20' 09"
27	Franco Franchi (ITA)	Italy	+ 2h 24' 16"
28	André Rosseel (BEL)	Belgium	+ 2h 29' 59"
29	Maurice Neyt (BEL)	Belgium	+ 2h 34' 31"
30	Francisco Masip (ESP)	Spain	+ 2h 41' 18"
31	Jacques Marinelli (FRA)	Paris	+ 2h 44' 42"
32	Gilbert Bauvin (FRA)	North-East/Centre	+ 2h 47' 21"
33	Jean Malléjac (FRA)	West/South-West	+ 2h 48' 03"
34	Maurice Quentin (FRA)	France	+ 2h 49' 26"
35	Luciano Pezzi (ITA)	Italy	+ 2h 49' 57"
36	Georges Decaux (FRA)	Paris	+ 2h 50' 35"
37	Raoul Rémy (FRA)	France	+ 2h 51' 56"
38	Roger Decock (BEL)	Belgium	+ 2h 52' 16"
39	Ahmed Kebaili (FRA)	North Africa	+ 2h 52' 48"
40	Jacques Renaud (FRA)	Paris	+ 2h 53' 01"
41	Mario Baroni (ITA)	Italy	+ 2h 53' 09"
42	Andrés Trobat (ESP)	Spain	+ 2h 53' 48"
43	Lucien Lazaridès (FRA)	France	+ 2h 54' 24"
44	Siro Bianchi (FRA)	South-East	+ 2h 59' 06"
45	Jean de Gribaldy (FRA)	North-East/Centre	+ 3h 02' 26"
46	Giovanni Corrieri (ITA)	Italy	+ 3h 03' 05"
47	José Gil (ESP)	Spain	+ 3h 06' 01"
48	Eugène Telotte (FRA)	Paris	+ 3h 14' 39"
49	Jacques Vivier (FRA)	West/South-West	+ 3h 15' 21"
50	Walter Diggelmann (SUI)	Switzerland	+ 3h 21' 34"
51	Ettore Milano (ITA)	Italy	+ 3h 28' 04"
52	Carlo Lafranchi (SUI)	Switzerland	+ 3h 28' 42"
53	Thijs Roks (NED)	Netherlands	+ 3h 29' 05"
54	Marcel Fernandez (FRA)	North Africa	+ 3h 30' 54"
55	Pierre Pardoën (FRA)	North-East/Centre	+ 3h 34' 31"
56	Alfredo Martini (ITA)	Italy	+ 3h 37' 32"
57	Johny Goedert (LUX)	Luxembourg	+ 3h 38' 19"
58	Fiorenzo Crippa (ITA)	Italy	+ 3h 40' 46"
59	Lucien Teisseire (FRA)	France	+ 3h 40' 56"
60	Hans Dekkers (NED)	Netherlands	+ 3h 41' 55"
61	Roger Rossinelli (FRA)	North-East/Centre	+ 3h 42' 46"
62	Giulio Bresci (ITA)	Italy	+ 3h 50' 34"
63	Bernard Gauthier (FRA)	France	+ 3h 57' 16"
64	Robert Bonnaventure (FRA)	France	+ 4h 02' 18"
65	Joseph Mirando (ITA)	South-East	+ 4h 06' 33"
66	Paul Giguet (FRA)	South-East	+ 4h 08' 35"
67	René Rotta (FRA)	South-East	+ 4h 08' 58"
68	Jean Bertaina (FRA)	South-East	+ 4h 09' 30"
69	Hein van Breenen (NED)	Netherlands	+ 4h 18' 54"
70	Tino Sabbadini (FRA)	West/South-West	+ 4h 34' 34"
71	Adolphe Pezzuli (FRA)	South-East	+ 4h 41' 59"
72	Heinrich Spuhler (SUI)	Switzerland	+ 4h 45' 51"
73	Jean Delahaye (FRA)	West/South-West	+ 4h 58' 32"
74	Raymond Scardin (FRA)	West/South-West	+ 4h 59' 48"
75	André Bernard (FRA)	West/South-West	+ 5h 19' 19"
76	Henk Faanhof (NED)	Netherlands	+ 5h 21' 13"
77	Vincent Soler (FRA)	North Africa	+ 7h 11' 36"
78	Henri Paret (FRA)	North Africa	+ 7h 15' 09"

=== Mountains classification ===
Final mountains classification (1–10)
Rank	Rider	Team	Points
1	Fausto Coppi (ITA)	Italy	92
2	Antonio Gelabert (ESP)	Spain	69
3	Jean Robic (FRA)	France	60
4	Stan Ockers (BEL)	Belgium	53
5	Raphaël Géminiani (FRA)	France	51
6	Gino Bartali (ITA)	Italy	42
7	Jean Dotto (FRA)	France	35
8	Bernardo Ruiz (ESP)	Spain	28
9	Andrea Carrea (ITA)	Italy	23
10	Jan Nolten (NED)	Netherlands	22

=== Team classification ===
Final team classification
Rank	Team	Time
1	Italy	455h 56' 40"
2	France	+ 25' 16"
3	Belgium	+ 54' 56"
4	Spain	+ 2h 53' 44"
5	Netherlands	+ 2h 59' 52"
6	North-East/Centre	+ 4h 26' 06"
7	South-East	+ 4h 46' 06"
8	West/South-West	+ 5h 58' 00"
9	Paris	+ 6h 27' 14"
10	Switzerland	+ 7h 00' 41"
11	North Africa	+ 7h 56' 49"

== Aftermath ==
The daily combativity award was a success, and has been awarded ever since. The mountain finishes also were spectacular enough to have been included in every Tour de France since.

Fausto Coppi would never start the Tour de France again.

The team selectors for the French national team felt that Raphaël Géminiani had held back when chasing Fausto Coppi, because they rode for the same sponsor. For that reason, Géminiani was left out the national team for the 1952 UCI Road World Championships. To avoid these problems in the future, Géminiani switched teams at the end of the season.

== Bibliography ==
- Augendre, Jacques (2016). Le Tour de France: Guide historique [The Tour de France: Historical guide] (PDF) (in French). Paris: Amaury Sport Organisation. Archived (PDF) from the original on 17 August 2016.
- McGann, Bill; McGann, Carol (2006). The Story of the Tour de France: 1903–1964. Vol. 1. Indianapolis: Dog Ear Publishing. ISBN 978-1-59858-180-5.
- Nauright, John; Parrish, Charles (2012). Sports Around the World: History, Culture, and Practice. Vol. 2. Santa Barbara, California: ABC–CLIO. ISBN 978-1-59884-300-2.
- Thompson, Christopher S. (2006). The Tour de France: A Cultural History. University of California Press. ISBN 0-520-24760-4.
- van den Akker, Pieter (2021). Tour de France rules and statistics: 1903–2021. Self-published. ISBN 979-8549164024.
- Woodland, Les (2007) [1st. pub. 2003]. The Yellow Jersey Companion to the Tour de France. London: Random House. ISBN 978-0-224-08016-3.
