= Michel Llorca =

French cyclist

Personal information
- Born: 9 June 1927
- Died: 11 March 2007 (aged 79)

Cycling career
- Sport: Cycling
- Role: Rider

Michel Llorca (9 June 1927 – 11 March 2007) was a French racing cyclist. He rode in the 1952 Tour de France.
