= René Biver =

Luxembourgish cyclist (1920–1983)

Personal information
- Born: 24 October 1920 Luxembourg City, Luxembourg
- Died: 24 October 1983 (aged 63) Sanem, Luxembourg

Cycling career
- Sport: Cycling
- Role: Rider

René Biver (24 October 1920 – 24 October 1983) was a Luxembourgish racing cyclist. He rode in the 1948, 1949 Tour de France, 1951 Tour de France and 1952 Tour de France.
