= Roger Rossinelli =

French cyclist

Personal information
- Born: 10 August 1927
- Died: 18 April 2005 (aged 77)

Cycling career
- Sport: Cycling
- Role: Rider

Roger Rossinelli (10 August 1927 – 18 April 2005) was a French racing cyclist. He rode in the 1952 Tour de France.
