= Dominique Canavèse =

French cyclist

Personal information
- Born: 6 November 1923
- Died: 28 August 2006 (aged 82)

Cycling career
- Sport: Cycling
- Role: Rider

Dominique Canavèse (6 November 1923 – 28 August 2006) was a French racing cyclist. He rode in the 1952 Tour de France.
