= Robert Vanderstockt =

Belgian cyclist

Personal information
- Born: 11 May 1924
- Died: 27 December 1994 (aged 70)

Cycling career
- Sport: Cycling
- Role: Rider

Robert Vanderstockt (11 May 1924 – 27 December 1994) was a Belgian racing cyclist. He rode in the 1952 Tour de France.
