= Carlo Lafranchi =

Swiss cyclist

Personal information
- Born: 22 July 1924
- Died: 1 April 2003 (aged 78)

Cycling career
- Sport: Cycling
- Role: Rider

Carlo Lafranchi (22 July 1924 – 1 April 2003) was a Swiss racing cyclist. He rode in the 1952 Tour de France.
