= Adolphe Pezzuli =

French cyclist

Personal information
- Born: 4 July 1928
- Died: 11 January 2013 (aged 84)

Cycling career
- Sport: Cycling
- Role: Rider

Adolphe Pezzuli (4 July 1928 – 11 January 2013) was a French racing cyclist. He rode in the 1952 Tour de France.
