= Jacques Vivier =

French cyclist (1930–2021)

Personal information
- Full name: Jacques Vivier
- Born: 9 October 1930 Mareuil-sur-Bel, France
- Died: 28 September 2021 (aged 90)

Cycling career
- Sport: Cycling
- Discipline: Road
- Role: Rider

Major wins
- Two Tour de France stages

Jacques Vivier (9 October 1930 – 28 September 2021) was a French professional road bicycle racer from 1951 to 1957.

== Major results ==
1951
Circuit du Cantal
1952
Tour de France:

Winner stage 20

1954
Felletin
Tour de France:

Winner stage 7

1955
Lubersac
