= Vincent Soler =

Algerian cyclist

Personal information
- Born: 7 June 1928
- Died: 18 August 2012 (aged 83)

Cycling career
- Sport: Cycling
- Role: Rider

Vincent Soler (7 June 1928 – 18 August 2012) was an Algerian racing cyclist. He rode in the 1951 Tour de France.
