= Eugène Telotte =

French cyclist

Personal information
- Born: 13 November 1926 Lille, France

Cycling career
- Sport: Cycling
- Role: Rider

Eugène Telotte (born 13 November 1926) was a French racing cyclist. He rode in the 1952 Tour de France.
