= Heinrich Spuhler =

Swiss cyclist

Personal information
- Born: 19 December 1925
- Died: 2 July 1996 (aged 70)

Cycling career
- Sport: Cycling
- Role: Rider

Heinrich Spuhler (19 December 1925 – 2 July 1996) was a Swiss racing cyclist. He rode in the 1952 Tour de France.
