= Jean Delahaye =

French cyclist

Personal information
- Born: 4 November 1929 Normandy, France
- Died: 26 June 2017 (aged 87)

Cycling career
- Sport: Cycling
- Role: Rider

Jean Delahaye (4 November 1929 – 26 June 2017) was a French racing cyclist. He rode in the 1951 and 1952 Tour de France.
