= Maurice Neyt =

Belgian cyclist

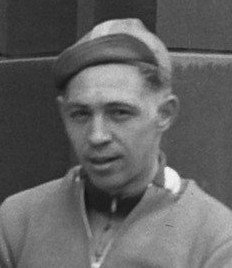

Personal information
- Born: 13 August 1928
- Died: 20 February 2006 (aged 77)

Cycling career
- Sport: Cycling
- Role: Rider

Maurice Neyt (13 August 1928 – 20 February 2006) was a Belgian racing cyclist. He rode in the 1952 Tour de France.
