= André Bernard (cyclist) =

French cyclist

Personal information
- Born: 29 August 1930
- Died: 15 December 2015 (aged 85)

Cycling career
- Sport: Cycling
- Role: Rider

André Bernard (29 August 1930 – 15 December 2015) was a French racing cyclist. He rode in the 1952 Tour de France.
