= Armand Papazian =

French cyclist

Personal information
- Born: 15 July 1928
- Died: 16 December 1991 (aged 63)

Cycling career
- Sport: Cycling
- Role: Rider

Armand Papazian (15 July 1928 – 16 December 1991) was a French racing cyclist. He rode in the 1952 Tour de France.
