= Walter Diggelmann =

Swiss cyclist

Personal information
- Full name: Walter Diggelmann
- Born: 11 August 1915 Zürich, Switzerland
- Died: 5 March 1999 (aged 83) Guntalingen, Switzerland

Cycling career
- Sport: Cycling
- Discipline: Road
- Role: Rider

Major wins
- Züri-Metzgete (1941); 1 stage 1952 Tour de France

Walter Diggelmann (Zürich, 11 August 1915 – Guntalingen, 5 March 1999) was a Swiss professional road bicycle racer. Diggelmann won one stage in the 1952 Tour de France.

== Major results ==
1938
Giro del Mendrisiotto
1940
Bern - Geneva
1941
Züri-Metzgete
1943
Tour des 3 lacs
1948
Six days of Chicago (with Hugo Koblet)
1949
Six days of New York (with Hugo Koblet)
1952
Tour de France:

Winner stage 9

Sporting positions
Preceded by Robert Zimmermann	Winner of the Züri-Metzgete; 1941	Succeeded by Paul Egli
