= José Gil Solé =

Spanish cyclist (1929–2000)

Personal information
- Born: 3 February 1929
- Died: 10 September 2000 (aged 71)

Cycling career
- Sport: Cycling
- Role: Rider

José Gil Solé (3 February 1929 – 10 September 2000) was a Spanish racing cyclist. He rode in the 1952 Tour de France.
