= Martin Metzger =

Swiss cyclist

Personal information
- Born: 18 November 1925
- Died: 17 June 1994 (aged 68)

Cycling career
- Sport: Cycling
- Role: Rider

Martin Metzger (18 November 1925 – 17 June 1994) was a Swiss racing cyclist. He rode in the 1950 Tour de France.
