= Marcel Zelasco =

French cyclist

Personal information
- Born: 16 August 1924 Algiers, French Algeria
- Died: 12 January 2002 (aged 77) Sanary-sur-Mer, France

Cycling career
- Sport: Cycling
- Role: Rider

Marcel Zelasco (16 August 1924 – 12 January 2002) was a French racing cyclist. He rode in the 1950 Tour de France.
