= Henri Paret (cyclist, born 1929) =

French cyclist

Personal information
- Full name: Henri Paret
- Born: 28 November 1929 Casablanca, Morocco
- Died: 17 August 1999 (aged 69) Alix, France

Cycling career
- Sport: Cycling
- Role: Rider

Henri Paret (28 November 1929 – 17 August 1999) was a French racing cyclist. He finished in last place in the 1952 Tour de France.
