= Siro Bianchi =

French cyclist

Personal information
- Born: 23 August 1924
- Died: 16 June 1992 (aged 67)

Cycling career
- Sport: Cycling
- Role: Rider

Siro Bianchi (23 August 1924 – 16 June 1992) was a French racing cyclist. He rode in the 1952 Tour de France. Italian by birth, he was naturalized French on 3 July 1953.
