= Johny Goedert =

Luxembourgish cyclist (1929–2013)

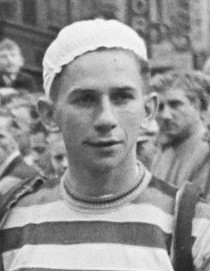

Personal information
- Born: 17 June 1929 Tétange, Luxembourg
- Died: 17 June 2013 (aged 84) Mondorf-les-Bains, Luxembourg

Cycling career
- Sport: Cycling
- Role: Rider

Johny Goedert (17 June 1929 – 17 June 2013) was a Luxembourgish racing cyclist. He rode in the 1952 Tour de France.
