= Jean-Marie Cieleska =

French cyclist

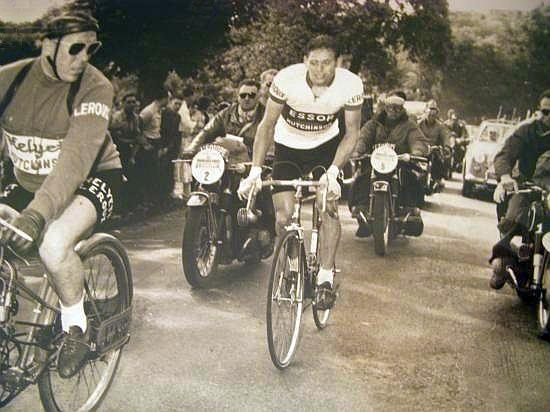
- Cieleska at the 1958 Bordeaux–Paris

Personal information
- Born: 19 February 1928 Pompey, France
- Died: 5 May 1998 (aged 70) Bourges, France

Cycling career
- Sport: Cycling
- Discipline: Road
- Role: Rider

Professional teams
- 1951–1955: Gitane–Hutchinson
- 1956–1957: Helyett–Potin–Hutchinson
- 1958: Essor–Leroux
- 1959–1960: Helyett–Leroux–Fynsec–Hutchinson

Jean-Marie Cieleska (19 February 1928 – 5 May 1998) was a French racing cyclist. He rode in the 1951 Tour de France.

== Major results ==
1951
2nd Boucles de la Seine
1954
2nd Boucles de la Seine
1955
1st Paris–Camembert
1st Paris–Bourges
1st Circuit du Morbihan
3rd Paris–Tours
3rd Grand Prix d'Espéraza
1956
1st Grand Prix d'Espéraza
1st Paris–Valenciennes
3rd Bordeaux–Paris
1958
1st Bordeaux–Paris
1959
1st Grand Prix d'Espéraza
