= Raymond Scardin =

French cyclist

Personal information
- Born: 12 April 1924
- Died: 6 December 2009 (aged 85)

Cycling career
- Sport: Cycling
- Role: Rider

Raymond Scardin (12 April 1924 – 6 December 2009) was a French racing cyclist. He rode in the 1952 Tour de France.
