= René Rotta =

French cyclist

Personal information
- Born: 27 October 1928
- Died: 20 July 2007 (aged 78)

Cycling career
- Sport: Cycling
- Role: Rider

René Rotta (27 October 1928 – 20 July 2007) was a French racing cyclist. He rode in the 1952 Tour de France.
