= Jean Bertaina =

French cyclist (1928–2018)

Personal information
- Born: 9 April 1928
- Died: 2 November 2018 (aged 90)

Cycling career
- Sport: Cycling
- Role: Rider

Jean Bertaina (9 April 1928 – 2 November 2018) was a French racing cyclist. He rode in the 1952 Tour de France.
