= Pierre Molinéris =

French cyclist

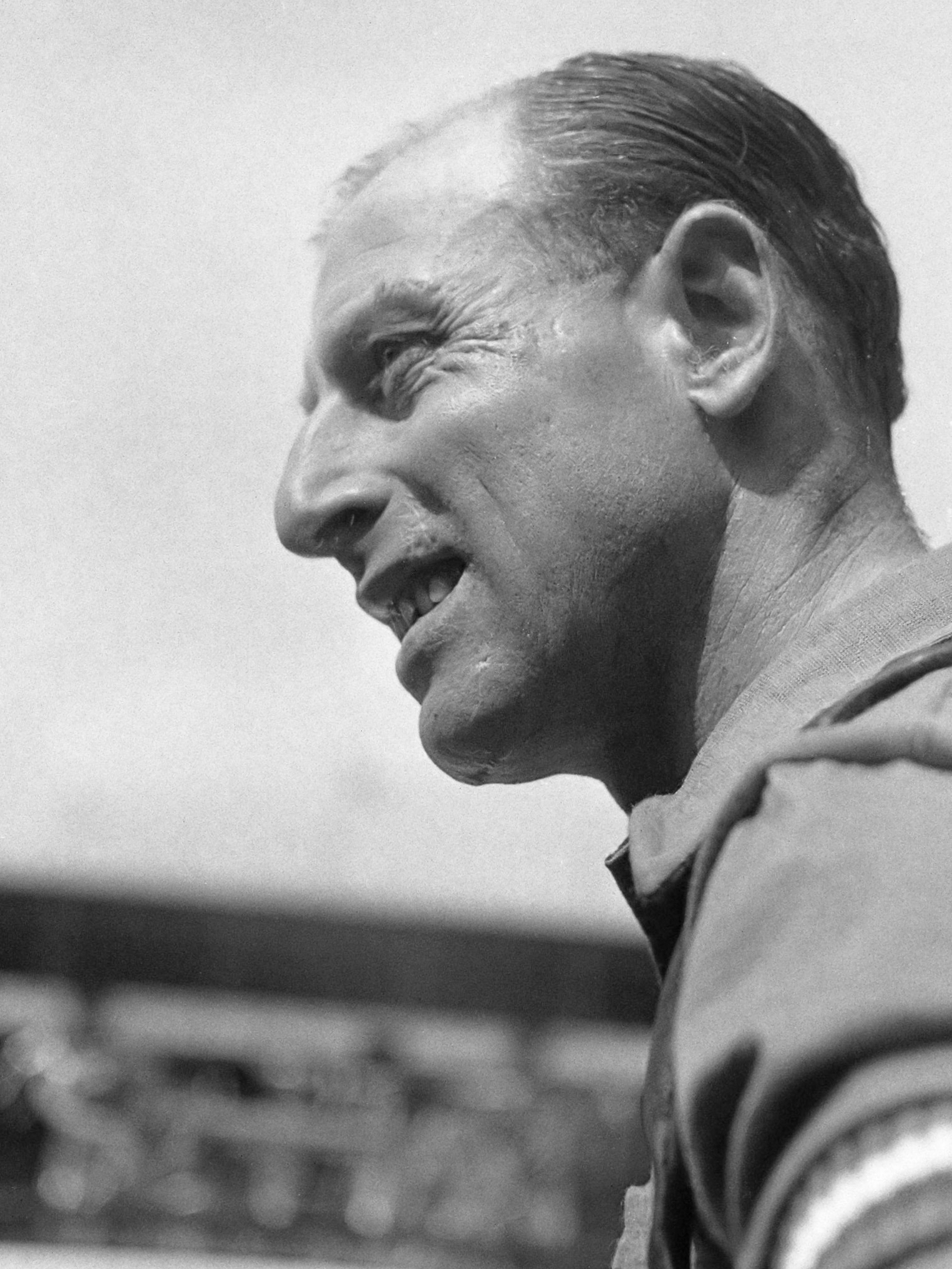

Personal information
- Full name: Pierre Molinéris
- Born: 21 May 1920 Nice, France
- Died: 7 February 2009 (aged 88)

Cycling career
- Sport: Cycling
- Current team: Retired
- Discipline: Road
- Role: Rider

Major wins
- 1 stage Tour de France

Pierre Molinéris (21 May 1920 in Nice – 7 February 2009) was a French professional road bicycle racer.

== Major results ==
1942
Boucles de Sospel
1943
St.-Etienne - Le Puy
1944
Saint-Chamond
1945
Nice
1946
GP Vercors
Toulon
1947
Besançon
Nice - Puget - Théniers - Nice
1948
Circuit des Six Provinces
Firminy - Roanne - Firminy
Nice-Mont Agel
Nice - Puget - Théniers - Nice
Tour de Haute-Savoie
1949
Grenoble
Polymultipliée Lyonnaise
Firminy - Roanne - Firminy
1950
Boucles de l'Aulne
Circuit du Mont Blanc
Nantua
GP du Pneumatique
1951
GP de Thiers
Montluçon
Paris - St Amand Montrond
1952
Tour de France:

Winner stage 4

1953
Aurillac
Circuit du Mont Ventoux
Ussel
Circuit du Mont Blanc
1954
Circuit de la Vallée d'Ossau
Saint-Vallier
1955
GP du Pneumatique
Circuit du Mont Blanc
