= Andrea Carrea =

Italian cyclist

Personal information
- Full name: Andrea Carrea
- Born: 14 August 1924 Gavi Ligure, Italy
- Died: 13 January 2013 (aged 88) Cassano Spinola, Italy

Cycling career
- Sport: Cycling
- Discipline: Road
- Role: Rider

Andrea Carrea (14 August 1924 – 13 January 2013) was an Italian professional road bicycle racer. He was the first to ride the Alpe d'Huez in the yellow jersey of leadership in the Tour de France and probably the only rider to have wept in distress at accidentally leading the race.

== Professional career ==
Andrea Carrea was born in Gavi Ligure, Italy, and was a professional from 1948 to 1958. For much of that time he rode as a domestique for Fausto Coppi, of whom he was in awe. "He was a gregario par excellence," said the journalist Jean-Luc Gatellier, "the incarnation of personal disinterest... showing to perfection the notion of personal sacrifice. He refused the slightest bit of personal glory."

Carrea was riding for Coppi in the Tour de France of 1952 when a group rode clear of the main field on the way to Lausanne. Carrea went with it to protect his leader's interests. He said:

Without knowing it, I had slid into the important break of the day and at Lausanne, to my great surprise, I heard I had inherited a jersey destined for champions. For me, it was a terrible situation."

Carrea had no idea until he crossed the line that he had become the race leader. When officials told him, he looked bewildered, then distressed, and burst into tears. He had to be dragged to the rostrum. He had upstaged Coppi and he dreaded the consequences. He wept as he received his jersey, looking constantly down the road for the main field that included his leader. Jean-Paul Ollivier said:

He did not understand and cried when he put on the livery. He thought the sky had fallen in. How would Fausto take it? When the champion arrived a few minutes later, Carrea went towards him in tears to offer his excuses. You must understand that I did not want this jersey, Fausto. I have no right to it. A poor man like me, the yellow jersey?

Coppi knew before he finished that Carrea had taken the jersey. He crossed the line while he was on the rostrum. He said: "I wondered how Carrea, so shy and so emotional, was going to take it. When I went to congratulate him on the track at Lausanne, he didn't know what face he ought to adopt." Carrea feared that Coppi's smile was for public consumption, that his wrath would come when they reached their hotel. Still not knowing what to say, he cried like a child, said Gatellier, and poured out excuses. Coppi, touched by his tears, comforted him. Carrea was pleased to lose the jersey the following day, a day he started by posing for photographers in his yellow jersey while symbolically polishing his leader's shoes. Coppi, who called Carrea "the good and wise Sandrino", said:

Ours is certainly a very hard profession with terrible demands and painful sacrifices. Carrea gave everything to me. In return I offered him only money. I know very well that if he was not my team-mate he would earn much less, and when all is said and done he is happy and many of his comrades envy him, but I personally think he deserves more than he has the right to: a little of intoxication of triumph. I had a way of settling the debt: it was to let him wear the jersey for a few days. Do you know what he said to the journalists the next evening after he had taken the jersey? That it was not right for a soldier to leave his captain.

Carrea wore the jersey for just one day. Jean Robic attacked on Alpe d'Huez, which the Tour was riding for the first time, and Coppi countered and with it took the lead. But that still let Carrea, way down the field, to be the first in the Tour's history to ride the Alpe in the maillot jaune. Carrea also won a stage in the Tour de Romandie. For years after retiring, he rode up Alpe d'Huez ahead of the Tour de France, recognised only rarely by spectators. It was, he said:

a pilgrimage that nothing would make me miss.

At the time of his death, Carrea lived at Cassano Spinola, close to Coppi's former home.

== Palmarès ==
1952
Herve
Tour de France:

Wearing yellow jersey for one day
9th place overall classification
