= André Rosseel =

Belgian cyclist

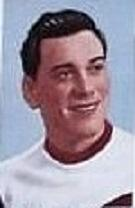
- Belgian professional road bicycle racer

Personal information
- Full name: André Rosseel
- Born: 23 November 1924 Lauwe, Belgium
- Died: 8 December 1965 (aged 41) Roeselare, Belgium

Cycling career
- Sport: Cycling
- Discipline: Road
- Role: Rider

Major wins
- 4 stages Tour de France; Gent–Wevelgem (1951)

André Rosseel (23 November 1924 in Lauwe – 8 December 1965 in Roeselare) was a Belgian professional road bicycle racer. Rosseel won 4 stages in the Tour de France.

== Major results ==
1946
Belgium national junior road race champion
1947
Anzegem
Omloop van Midden-Vlaanderen
1948
Aalst
Dwars door Vlaanderen
1950
Dwars door Vlaanderen
1951
Tour of Algeria
Gent–Wevelgem
Tour de France:

Winner stages 8 and 15

1952
Tour de France:

Winner stages 2 and 16

1953
Aalst
Emelgem
Ruiselede
1954
Koksijde
Heule
Tour du Nord
Moorsele
Saint-Ghislain
1955
Vlaamse pijl
Wervik
1956
Circuit des régions frontalières Mouscron
Kruishoutem
Ruddervoorde
Heule
Dentergem
Le Bizet
Roeselare
Zonnebeke
Waarschoot
1957
Aartrijke
Oedelem
Dentergem
Ploegsteert
