= Georges Decaux =

French cyclist

Personal information
- Full name: Georges Decaux
- Born: April 14, 1930 (age 96) Gamaches, France

Cycling career
- Sport: Cycling
- Discipline: Road
- Role: Rider

Major wins
- 1 stage Tour de France

Georges Decaux (Gamaches, 14 April 1930 - October 12, 2015) was a French professional road bicycle racer from 1952 to 1956. In 1952, Decaux won a stage in the Tour de France.

== Major results ==
1952
Circuit de la Vallée de la Loire
Tour de France:

Winner stage 15

1954
Circuit de la Vallée de la Loire
