= Jan Nolten =

Dutch cyclist

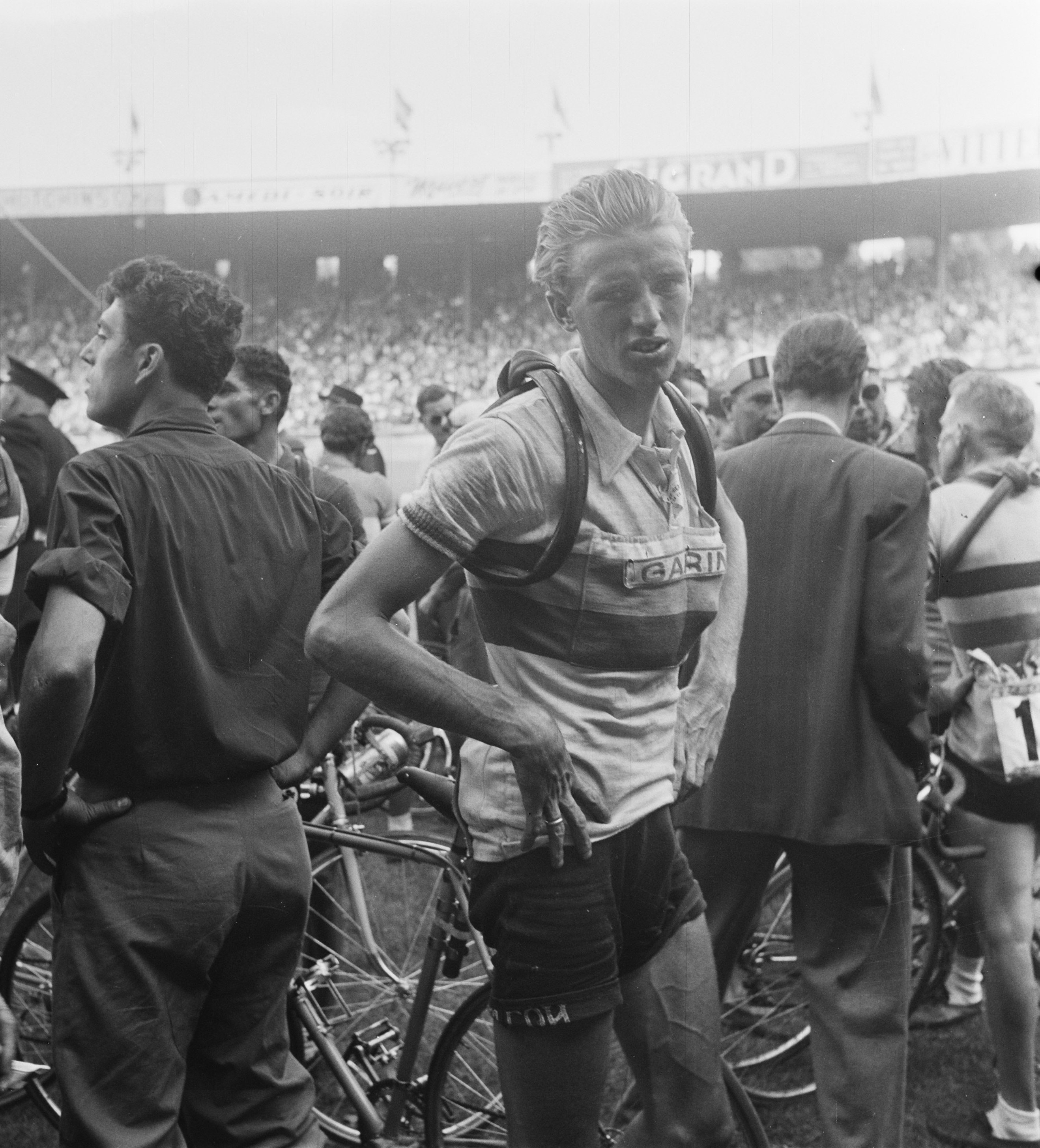
- Jan Nolten in Paris after the finish of the 1952 Tour de France

Personal information
- Full name: Jan Nolten
- Born: 20 January 1930 Sittard, Netherlands
- Died: 13 July 2014 (aged 84) Sittard, Netherlands

Cycling career
- Sport: Cycling
- Discipline: Road
- Role: Rider
- Rider type: Climber

Major wins
- Grand Tours Tour de France 2 individual stages (1952, 1953) Giro d'Italia 1 individual stage (1956)

Jan Nolten (20 January 1930 – 13 July 2014) was a Dutch professional road bicycle racer. Nolten participated in five Tours de France, and won two stages.

== Death ==
Nolten was hospitalized in July 2014 after suffering a brain hemorrhage and died three days later.

== Major results ==
1952
Tour de France:

Winner stage 12

1953
Tour de France:

Winner stage 8

1956
Giro d'Italia:

Winner stage 12
