= Henk Faanhof =

Dutch cyclist (1922–2015)

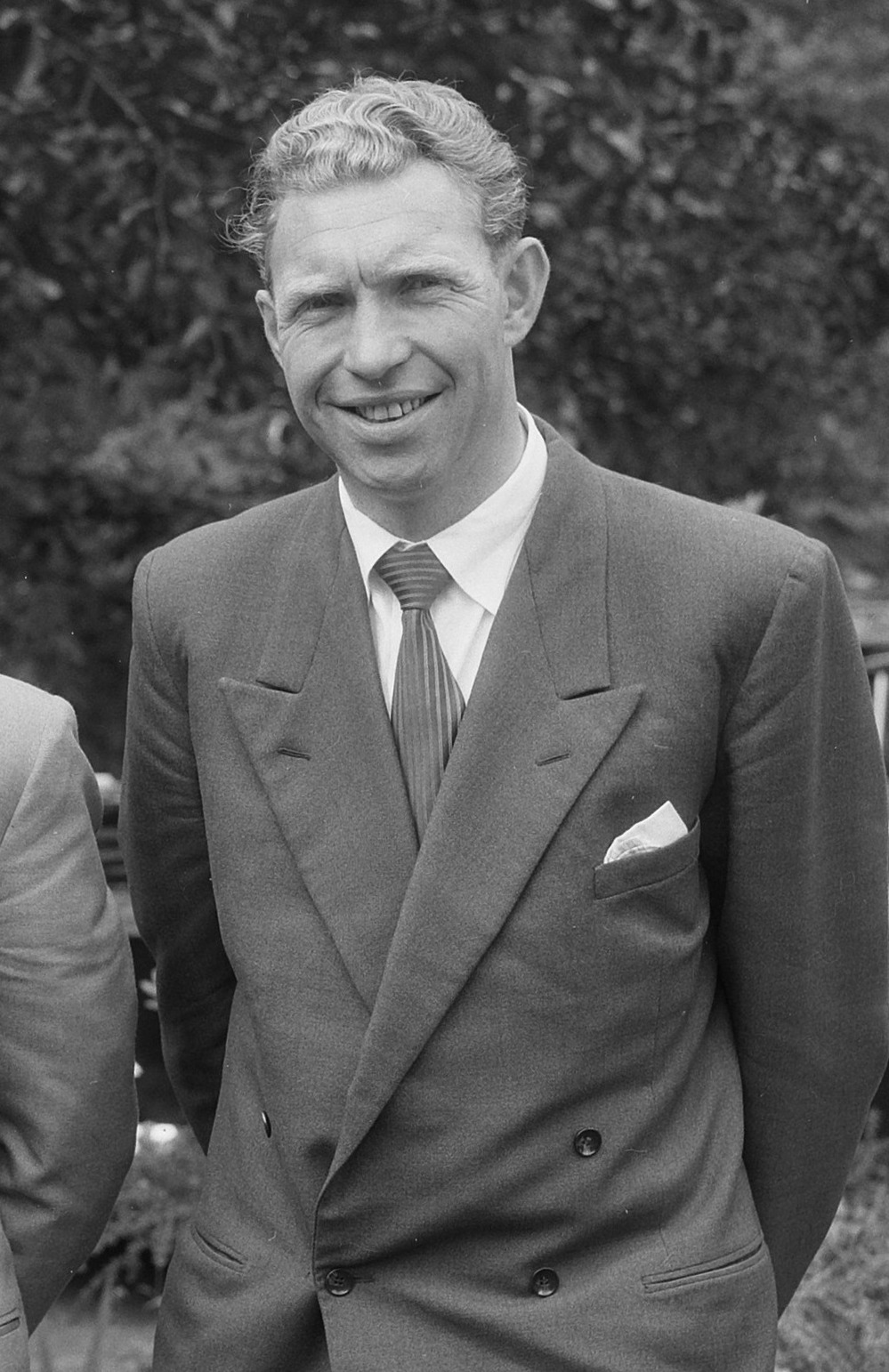
- Henk Faanhof in 1954

Personal information
- Full name: Henk Faanhof
- Born: 29 August 1922 Amsterdam, Netherlands
- Died: 27 January 2015 (aged 92) Amsterdam, Netherlands

Cycling career
- Sport: Cycling
- Discipline: Road
- Role: Rider

Major wins
- 1 stage Tour de France
Medal record
Men's road bicycle racing
Representing Netherlands
World Championships
Gold medal – first place	1949 Copenhagen	Amateur's Road Race

Henk Faanhof (29 August 1922 – 27 January 2015) was a Dutch professional road bicycle racer from Amsterdam. Faanhof won one stage in the 1954 Tour de France. In 1947 Faanhof was disqualified in the Dutch National Road Race Championship after changing bicycles with a teammate. The rule that bicycle changes were not allowed was new and Faanhof did not know about it. He also competed in three events at the 1948 Summer Olympics. Faanhof died in Amsterdam on 27 January 2015, aged 92, less than a week before two other members of the Dutch men's team pursuit squad, Gerrit Voorting and Joop Harmans.

== Major results ==
1949
World Amateur champion road race
1950
Sas van Gent
1951
GP de Marmignolles
1952
Hoensbroek
Alphen aan de Rijn
1954
Tour de France:

Winner stage 9

== See also ==
- List of Dutch Olympic cyclists
