= Hans Dekkers (cyclist, born 1928) =

Dutch cyclist

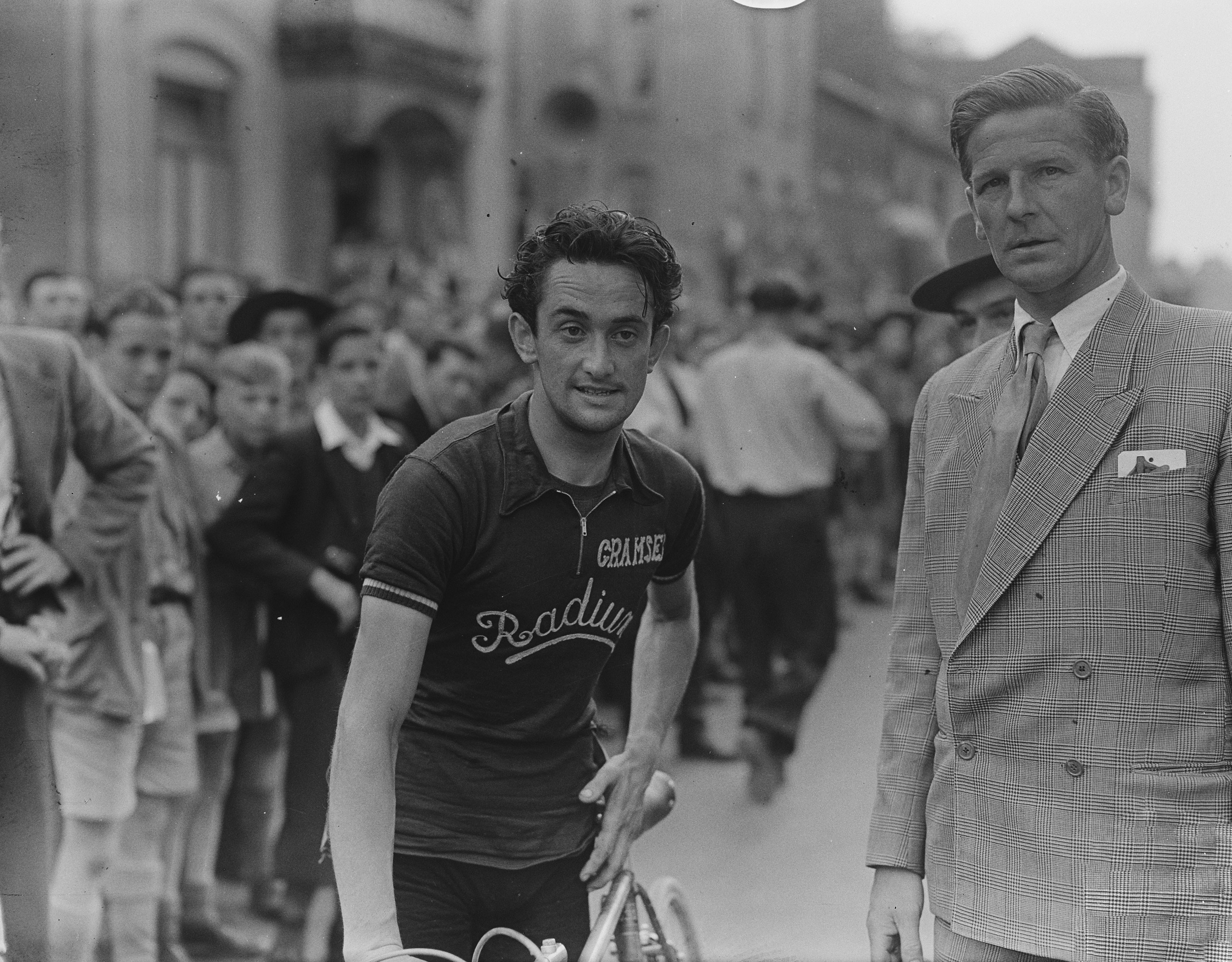

Personal information
- Full name: Hans Dekkers
- Born: 16 June 1928 Eindhoven, the Netherlands
- Died: 31 August 1984 (aged 56)

Cycling career
- Sport: Cycling
- Discipline: Road
- Role: Rider

Major wins
- Dutch National Road Race Champion (1951, 1952); 1 stage Tour de France

Hans Dekkers (16 June 1928 in Eindhoven — 31 August 1984) was a Dutch professional road bicycle racer.

== Major results ==
1949
Omloop der Kempen
1951
(Netherlands) Dutch National Road Race Championship
Ronde van Noord-Holland
1952
(Netherlands) Dutch National Road Race Championship
Houthalen-Helchteren
Tour de France:

Winner stage 19

1953
Breda
Scheldeprijs Vlaanderen
Maastricht
Sas van Gent
