= Jean Le Guilly =

French cyclist

Personal information
- Born: 27 January 1932 Le Faouët, France
- Died: 22 March 2005 (aged 73) Le Faouët, France

Cycling career
- Sport: Cycling
- Role: Rider

Jean Le Guilly (27 January 1932 – 22 March 2005) was a French professional racing cyclist. He rode in four editions of the Tour de France.
