= Tino Sabbadini =

French cyclist

Personal information
- Full name: Tino Sabbadini
- Born: 21 August 1928 Monsempron-Libos, France
- Died: 7 November 2002 (aged 74) Monsempron-Libos, France

Cycling career
- Sport: Cycling
- Discipline: Road
- Role: Rider

Major wins
- 1 stage 1958 Tour de France

Tino Sabbadini (Monsempron-Libos, 21 August 1928 — Monsempron-Libos, 7 November 2002) was a French professional road bicycle racer. He won the fourth stage of the 1958 Tour de France.

== Major results ==
1950
Villeneuve sur Lot
1955
Nantes
Circuit de la Vienne
1956
Circuit de l'Indre
Villeneuve sur Lot
1957
Circuit de l'Indre
1958
Eymet
GP de Cannes
Gap
Tour de France:

Winner stage 5

1959
Agen
1960
Trédion
1961
Bayonne
La Couronne
1963
Mazamet
