= Mario Baroni =

Italian cyclist (1927–1994)

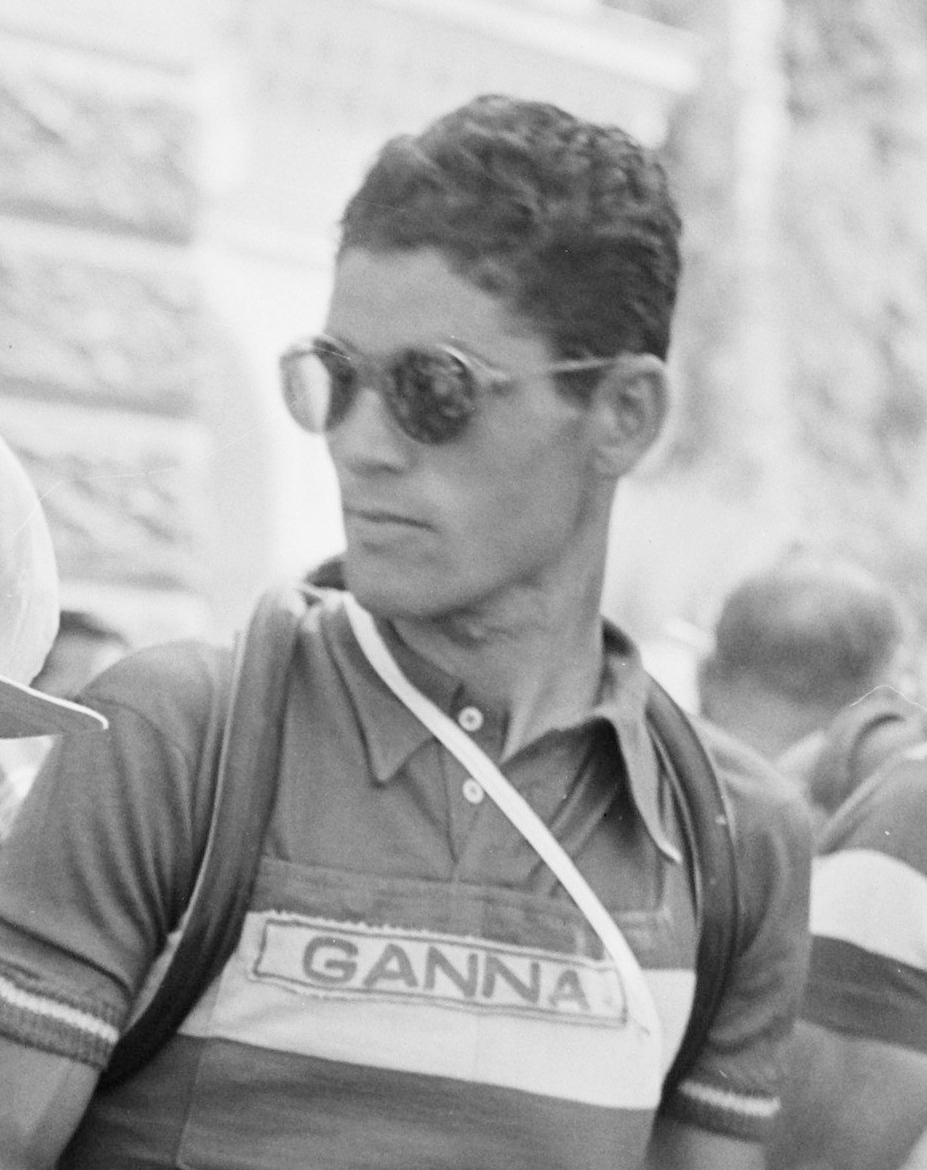
- Mario Baroni in 1952

Personal information
- Born: 11 March 1927
- Died: 1 August 1994 (aged 67)

Cycling career
- Sport: Cycling
- Discipline: Road
- Role: Rider

Professional teams
- 1949–1950: Bartali
- 1951–1953: Ganna
- 1954–1956: Nivea
- 1957: Leo-Chlorodont
- 1958: Torpado

Mario Baroni (11 March 1927 – 1 August 1994) was an Italian racing cyclist. He won stage 14 of the 1957 Giro d'Italia.

== Major results ==
1956
1st Stage 1 Ronde van Nederland
6th Milan–San Remo
1957
1st Stage 12 Vuelta a España
1st Stage 14 Giro d'Italia
