= Pierre Pardoën =

French cyclist (1930–2019)

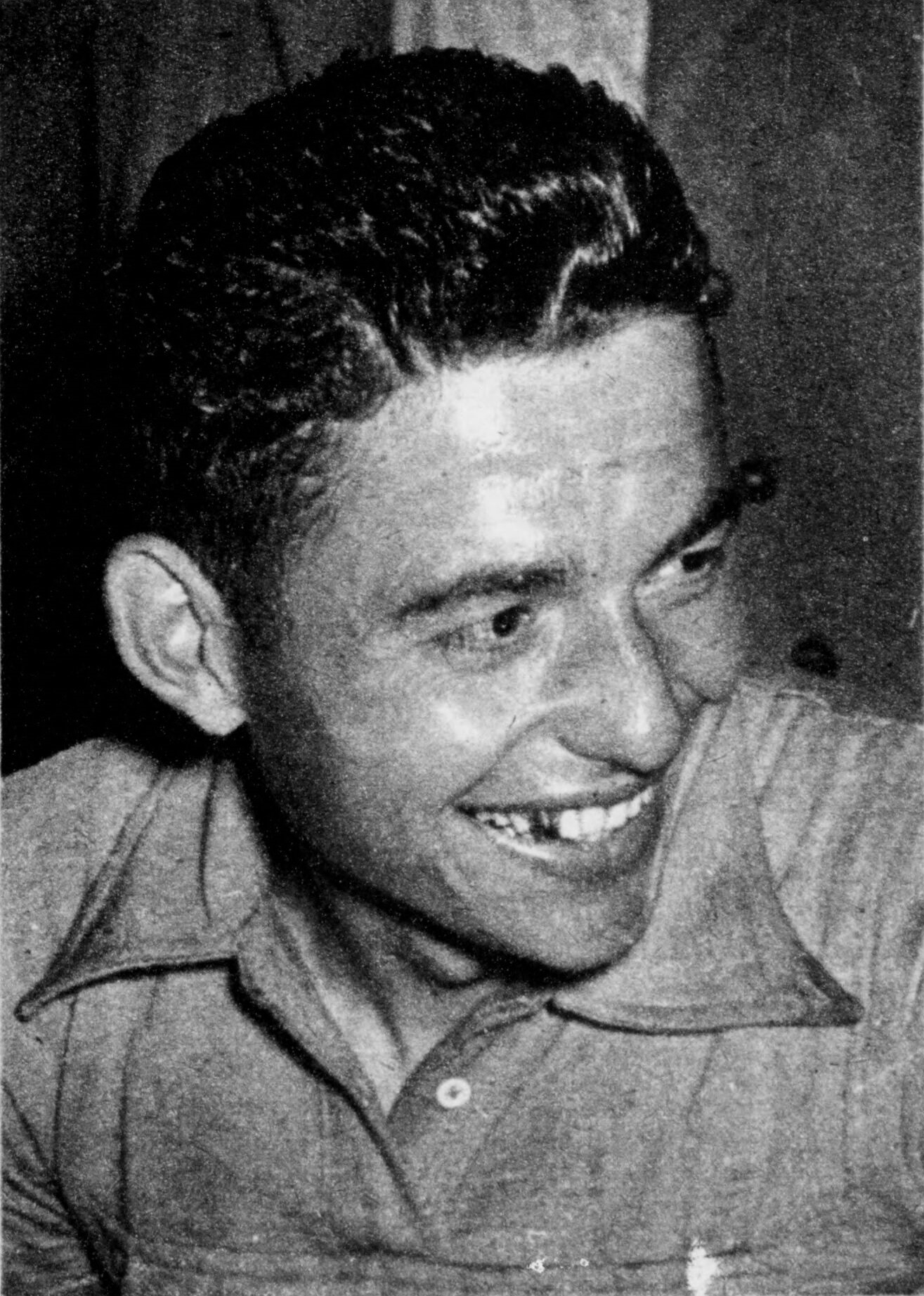

Personal information
- Born: 8 August 1930 Amiens, France
- Died: 17 June 2019 (aged 88)

Cycling career
- Sport: Cycling
- Role: Rider

Pierre Pardoën (8 August 1930 – 17 June 2019) was a French professional racing cyclist. He rode in two editions of the Tour de France.
