= Ahmed Kebaili =

Algerian cyclist

Personal information
- Born: 21 February 1925
- Died: 8 September 2013 (aged 88)

Cycling career
- Sport: Cycling
- Role: Rider

Ahmed Kebaili (21 February 1925 – 8 September 2013) was an Algerian racing cyclist. He rode in the 1950 Tour de France.
