= Alois De Hertog =

Belgian cyclist

Personal information
- Born: 9 August 1927 Sint-Katelijne-Waver, Belgium
- Died: 22 November 1993 (aged 66) Sint-Katelijne-Waver, Belgium

Cycling career
- Sport: Cycling
- Role: Rider

Alois De Hertog (9 August 1927 – 22 November 1993) was a Belgian racing cyclist. He won the 1953 edition of the Liège–Bastogne–Liège.
