= Marcel Fernandez =

French cyclist (1929–2024)

Personal information
- Born: 12 April 1929 Kléber, Oran, French Algeria
- Died: 21 March 2024 (aged 94) Lyon, France

Cycling career
- Sport: Cycling
- Role: Rider

Marcel Francois Fernandez (12 April 1929 – 21 March 2024) was a French racing cyclist. He rode in the 1951 Tour de France. Fernandez died in Lyon on 21 March 2024, at the age of 94.
