= List of teams and cyclists in the 1954 Tour de France =

List of cyclists

As was the custom since 1930, the 1954 Tour de France was contested by national and regional teams. Seven national teams were sent, with 10 cyclists each from France, the Netherlands, Belgium, Spain, Switzerland and Luxembourg/Austria (the latter a combined team). France additionally sent five regional teams from 10 cyclists each, divided into Center-North East France, West France, South East France, Ile de France and South West France. The combined team Luxembourg/Austria consisted of six Luxembourgian cyclists, three Austrian cyclists and one from Liechtenstein. In total, 110 cyclists started the race.

Notable absents were the Italian cyclists. In Italy, new sponsors had entered the market, named "extra-sportives" because they did not sell a product directly related to the sport. During the 1954 Giro d'Italia, this caused a strike, the Bernina strike. After this, the Italian federation decided not to send a team to the 1954 Tour de France.

== Start list ==
=== By team ===
France
No.	Rider	Pos.
1	Louison Bobet (FRA)	1
2	André Darrigade (FRA)	49
3	Adolphe Deledda (FRA)	26
4	Jean Forestier (FRA)	27
5	Raphaël Géminiani (FRA)	DNF
6	Nello Lauredi (FRA)	11
7	Pierre Molinéris (FRA)	59
8	Raoul Rémy (FRA)	38
9	Antonin Rolland (FRA)	19
10	Lucien Teisseire (FRA)	23

Netherlands
No.	Rider	Pos.
11	Henk Faanhof (NED)	47
12	Jules Maenen (NED)	DNF
13	Jan Nolten (NED)	14
14	Thijs Roks (NED)	DNF
15	Adri Suykerbuyk (NED)	DNF
16	Hein van Breenen (NED)	20
17	Nico van Est (NED)	DNF
18	Wim van Est (NED)	16
19	Gerrit Voorting (NED)	17
20	Wout Wagtmans (NED)	DNF

Belgium
No.	Rider	Pos.
21	Jean Brankart (BEL)	9
22	Alex Close (BEL)	29
23	Fred De Bruyne (BEL)	36
24	Marcel De Mulder (BEL)	21
25	Germain Derycke (BEL)	DNF
26	René De Smet (BEL)	34
27	Marcel Hendrickx (BEL)	64
28	Stan Ockers (BEL)	6
29	Alfons Van den Brande (BEL)	DNF
30	Richard Van Genechten (BEL)	22

Spain
No.	Rider	Pos.
41	Francisco Alomar (ESP)	31
42	Federico Bahamontes (ESP)	25
43	Salvador Botella (ESP)	54
44	Dalmacio Langarica (ESP)	DNF
45	Francisco Masip (ESP)	55
46	José Perez Llacer (ESP)	44
47	Emilio Rodríguez (ESP)	43
48	Manuel Rodríguez (ESP)	45
49	Bernardo Ruiz (ESP)	18
50	Andrés Trobat (ESP)	37

Switzerland
No.	Rider	Pos.
51	Carlo Clerici (SUI)	12
52	Emilio Croci-Torti (SUI)	56
53	Rolf Graf (SUI)	DNF
54	Hans Hollenstein (SUI)	DNF
55	Marcel Huber (SUI)	DNF
56	Hugo Koblet (SUI)	DNF
57	Ferdinand Kübler (SUI)	2
58	Martin Metzger (SUI)	DNF
59	Remo Pianezzi (SUI)	50
60	Fritz Schär (SUI)	3

Luxembourg/Austria
No.	Rider	Pos.
61	Marcel Dierkens (LUX)	69
62	Charly Gaul (LUX)	DNF
63	Francis Gelhausen (LUX)	DNF
64	Willy Kemp (LUX)	30
65	Nicolas Morn (LUX)	DNF
66	Jean Schmit (LUX)	DNF
67	Alfred Kain (AUT)	DNF
68	Kurt Schneider (AUT)	68
69	Kurt Urbancic (AUT)	DNF
70	Bertram Seger (LIE)	DNF

France – North-East/Centre
No.	Rider	Pos.
71	Gilbert Bauvin (FRA)	10
72	Jean Bellay (FRA)	66
73	Jean-Marie Cieleska (FRA)	46
74	Jean Dacquay (FRA)	DNF
75	Roger Hassenforder (FRA)	DNF
76	Jacques Marinelli (FRA)	DNF
77	Georges Meunier (FRA)	39
78	Gilbert Scodeller (FRA)	DNF
79	Jean Stablinski (FRA)	DNF
80	Eugène Telotte (FRA)	57

France – West
No.	Rider	Pos.
81	Pierre Barbotin (FRA)	DNF
82	Albert Bouvet (FRA)	63
83	Georges Gilles (FRA)	60
84	Émile Guérinel (FRA)	65
85	François Mahé (FRA)	15
86	Jean Malléjac (FRA)	5
87	Joseph Morvan (FRA)	DNF
88	Jean Robic (FRA)	DNF
89	André Ruffet (FRA)	DNF
90	Robert Varnajo (FRA)	41

France – South-East
No.	Rider	Pos.
91	Siro Bianchi (FRA)	DNF
92	Jean Dotto (FRA)	4
93	Raymond Elena (FRA)	DNF
94	Ahmed Kebaili (FRA)	DNF
95	Apo Lazaridès (FRA)	13
96	Lucien Lazaridès (FRA)	24
97	Joseph Mirando (FRA)	42
98	Pierre Polo (FRA)	DNF
99	Francis Siguenza (FRA)	61
100	Vincent Vitetta (FRA)	8

France – Île-de-France
No.	Rider	Pos.
101	Serge Blusson (FRA)	DNF
102	Stanislas Bober (FRA)	51
103	Jean Carle (FRA)	48
104	Dominique Forlini (FRA)	32
105	Raymond Hoorelbeke (FRA)	35
106	Jean Le Guily (FRA)	33
107	Maurice Quentin (FRA)	28
108	Attilio Redolfi (FRA)	DNF
109	Henri Surbatis (FRA)	DNF
110	Alfred Tonello (FRA)	58

France – South-West
No.	Rider	Pos.
111	Philippe Agut (FRA)	67
112	Louis Bergaud (FRA)	7
113	Louis Caput (FRA)	DNF
114	Joseph Cigano (FRA)	DNF
115	Marcel Dussault (FRA)	62
116	Marcel Guitard (FRA)	53
117	Valentin Huot (FRA)	DNF
118	René Privat (FRA)	52
119	René Remangeon (FRA)	DNF
120	Jacques Vivier (FRA)	40

=== By rider ===
Legend
No.	Starting number worn by the rider during the Tour
Pos.	Position in the general classification
DNF	Denotes a rider who did not finish

No.	Name	Nationality	Team	Pos.	Ref
1	Louison Bobet	France	France	1	
2	André Darrigade	France	France	49	
3	Adolphe Deledda	France	France	26	
4	Jean Forestier	France	France	27	
5	Raphaël Géminiani	France	France	DNF	
6	Nello Lauredi	France	France	11	
7	Pierre Molinéris	France	France	59	
8	Raoul Rémy	France	France	38	
9	Antonin Rolland	France	France	19	
10	Lucien Teisseire	France	France	23	
11	Henk Faanhof	Netherlands	Netherlands	47	
12	Jules Maenen	Netherlands	Netherlands	DNF	
13	Jan Nolten	Netherlands	Netherlands	14	
14	Thijs Roks	Netherlands	Netherlands	DNF	
15	Adri Suykerbuyk	Netherlands	Netherlands	DNF	
16	Hein van Breenen	Netherlands	Netherlands	20	
17	Nico van Est	Netherlands	Netherlands	DNF	
18	Wim van Est	Netherlands	Netherlands	16	
19	Gerrit Voorting	Netherlands	Netherlands	17	
20	Wout Wagtmans	Netherlands	Netherlands	DNF	
21	Jean Brankart	Belgium	Belgium	9	
22	Alex Close	Belgium	Belgium	29	
23	Fred De Bruyne	Belgium	Belgium	36	
24	Marcel De Mulder	Belgium	Belgium	21	
25	Germain Derycke	Belgium	Belgium	DNF	
26	René De Smet	Belgium	Belgium	34	
27	Marcel Hendrickx	Belgium	Belgium	64	
28	Stan Ockers	Belgium	Belgium	6	
29	Alfons Van den Brande	Belgium	Belgium	DNF	
30	Richard Van Genechten	Belgium	Belgium	22	
41	Francisco Alomar	Spain	Spain	31	
42	Federico Bahamontes	Spain	Spain	25	
43	Salvador Botella	Spain	Spain	54	
44	Dalmacio Langarica	Spain	Spain	DNF	
45	Francisco Masip	Spain	Spain	55	
46	José Perez Llacer	Spain	Spain	44	
47	Emilio Rodríguez	Spain	Spain	43	
48	Manuel Rodríguez	Spain	Spain	45	
49	Bernardo Ruiz	Spain	Spain	18	
50	Andrés Trobat	Spain	Spain	37	
51	Carlo Clerici	Switzerland	Switzerland	12	
52	Emilio Croci-Torti	Switzerland	Switzerland	56	
53	Rolf Graf	Switzerland	Switzerland	DNF	
54	Hans Hollenstein	Switzerland	Switzerland	DNF	
55	Marcel Huber	Switzerland	Switzerland	DNF	
56	Hugo Koblet	Switzerland	Switzerland	DNF	
57	Ferdinand Kübler	Switzerland	Switzerland	2	
58	Martin Metzger	Switzerland	Switzerland	DNF	
59	Remo Pianezzi	Switzerland	Switzerland	50	
60	Fritz Schär	Switzerland	Switzerland	3	
61	Marcel Dierkens	Luxembourg	Luxembourg/Austria	69	
62	Charly Gaul	Luxembourg	Luxembourg/Austria	DNF	
63	François Gelhausen	Luxembourg	Luxembourg/Austria	DNF	
64	Willy Kemp	Luxembourg	Luxembourg/Austria	30	
65	Nicolas Morn	Luxembourg	Luxembourg/Austria	DNF	
66	Jean Schmit	Luxembourg	Luxembourg/Austria	DNF	
67	Alfred Kain	Austria	Luxembourg/Austria	DNF	
68	Kurt Schneider	Austria	Luxembourg/Austria	68	
69	Kurt Urbancic	Austria	Luxembourg/Austria	DNF	
70	Bertram Seger	Liechtenstein	Luxembourg/Austria	DNF	
71	Gilbert Bauvin	France	France – North-East/Centre	10	
72	Jean Bellay	France	France – North-East/Centre	66	
73	Jean-Marie Cieleska	France	France – North-East/Centre	46	
74	Jean Dacquay	France	France – North-East/Centre	DNF	
75	Roger Hassenforder	France	France – North-East/Centre	DNF	
76	Jacques Marinelli	France	France – North-East/Centre	DNF	
77	Georges Meunier	France	France – North-East/Centre	39	
78	Gilbert Scodeller	France	France – North-East/Centre	DNF	
79	Jean Stablinski	France	France – North-East/Centre	DNF	
80	Eugène Telotte	France	France – North-East/Centre	57	
81	Pierre Barbotin	France	France – West	DNF	
82	Albert Bouvet	France	France – West	63	
83	Georges Gilles	France	France – West	60	
84	Émile Guérinel	France	France – West	65	
85	François Mahé	France	France – West	15	
86	Jean Malléjac	France	France – West	5	
87	Joseph Morvan	France	France – West	DNF	
88	Jean Robic	France	France – West	DNF	
89	André Ruffet	France	France – West	DNF	
90	Robert Varnajo	France	France – West	41	
91	Siro Bianchi	France	France – South-East	DNF	
92	Jean Dotto	France	France – South-East	4	
93	Raymond Elena	France	France – South-East	DNF	
94	Ahmed Kebaili	France	France – South-East	DNF	
95	Apo Lazaridès	France	France – South-East	13	
96	Lucien Lazaridès	France	France – South-East	24	
97	Joseph Mirando	France	France – South-East	42	
98	Pierre Polo	France	France – South-East	DNF	
99	Francis Siguenza	France	France – South-East	61	
100	Vincent Vitetta	France	France – South-East	8	
101	Serge Blusson	France	France – Île-de-France	DNF	
102	Stanislas Bober	France	France – Île-de-France	51	
103	Jean Carle	France	France – Île-de-France	48	
104	Dominique Forlini	France	France – Île-de-France	32	
105	Raymond Hoorelbeke	France	France – Île-de-France	35	
106	Jean Le Guily	France	France – Île-de-France	33	
107	Maurice Quentin	France	France – Île-de-France	28	
108	Attilio Redolfi	France	France – Île-de-France	DNF	
109	Henri Surbatis	France	France – Île-de-France	DNF	
110	Alfred Tonello	France	France – Île-de-France	58	
111	Philippe Agut	France	France – South-West	67	
112	Louis Bergaud	France	France – South-West	7	
113	Louis Caput	France	France – South-West	DNF	
114	Joseph Cigana	France	France – South-West	DNF	
115	Marcel Dussault	France	France – South-West	62	
116	Marcel Guitard	France	France – South-West	53	
117	Valentin Huot	France	France – South-West	DNF	
118	René Privat	France	France – South-West	52	
119	René Remangeon	France	France – South-West	DNF	
120	Jacques Vivier	France	France – South-West	40	
