= List of teams and cyclists in the 1955 Tour de France =

List of cyclists

As was the custom since 1930, the 1955 Tour de France was contested by national and regional teams. Eight national teams were sent, with 10 cyclists each from France, Belgium, Spain, Great Britain, the Netherlands, Italy, Switzerland, and a mixed team consisting of Luxembourgian, Austrian, German and Australian cyclists. France additionally sent five regional teams from 10 cyclists each, divided into Center-North East France, West France, South East France, Île-de-France and South West France. In total, 130 cyclists started the race.

The mixed team included cyclists from West Germany, which was the first time since the Second World War that German cyclists were allowed to ride the Tour. The Great Britain team was the first British team in Tour history.

Louison Bobet, the winner of the 1953 Tour de France and the 1954 Tour de France, had done an aggressive preparation in the early season before the Tour de France, aiming for his third victory. Bobet was the main favourite, also because he was the world champion.

== Start list ==
=== By team ===
France
No.	Rider	Pos.
1	Louison Bobet (FRA)	1
2	Jean Bobet (FRA)	14
3	André Darrigade (FRA)	49
4	Jean Dotto (FRA)	DNF
5	Jean Forestier (FRA)	32
6	Bernard Gauthier (FRA)	46
7	Raphaël Géminiani (FRA)	6
8	François Mahé (FRA)	10
9	Jean Malléjac (FRA)	DNF
10	Antonin Rolland (FRA)	5

Belgium
No.	Rider	Pos.
11	Jan Adriaensens (BEL)	28
12	Jean Brankart (BEL)	2
13	Alexandre Close (BEL)	9
14	Hilaire Couvreur (BEL)	DNF
15	Fred De Bruyne (BEL)	17
16	Raymond Impanis (BEL)	13
17	Stan Ockers (BEL)	8
18	Edgard Sorgeloos (BEL)	DNF
19	Richard Van Genechten (BEL)	DNF
20	Rik Van Steenbergen (BEL)	55

Spain
No.	Rider	Pos.
21	Francisco Alomar Florit (ESP)	DNF
22	Salvador Botella (ESP)	DNF
23	Gabriel Company (ESP)	57
24	Antonio Gelabert (ESP)	DNF
25	Jesús Loroño (ESP)	20
26	Francisco Massip (ESP)	DNF
27	José Mateo (ESP)	65
28	Carmelo Morales (ESP)	DNF
29	Miguel Poblet (ESP)	26
30	Bernardo Ruiz (ESP)	22

Great Britain
No.	Rider	Pos.
31	Dave Bedwell (GBR)	DNF
32	Tony Hoar (GBR)	69
33	Stan Jones (GBR)	DNF
34	Fred Krebs (GBR)	DNF
35	Bob Maitland (GBR)	DNF
36	Ken Mitchell (GBR)	DNF
37	Bernard Pusey (GBR)	DNF
38	Brian Robinson (GBR)	29
39	Ian Steel (GBR)	DNF
40	Bevis Wood (GBR)	DNF

Netherlands
No.	Rider	Pos.
41	Daan de Groot (NED)	36
42	Piet Haan (NED)	DNF
43	Jos Hinsen (NED)	41
44	Jan Nolten (NED)	21
45	Hein Van Breenen (NED)	27
46	Wies Van Dongen (NED)	DNF
47	Wim van Est (NED)	15
48	Adrie Voorting (NED)	DNF
49	Gerrit Voorting (NED)	DNF
50	Wout Wagtmans (NED)	19

Italy
No.	Rider	Pos.
51	Giancarlo Astrua (ITA)	7
52	Denilo Barozzi (ITA)	40
53	Rino Benedetti (ITA)	42
54	Eugenio Bertoglio (ITA)	DNF
55	Agostino Coletto (ITA)	12
56	Alessandro Fantini (ITA)	25
57	Pasquale Fornara (ITA)	4
58	Pietro Giudici (ITA)	30
59	Bruno Monti (ITA)	23
60	Luciano Pezzi (ITA)	34

Luxembourg/International
No.	Rider	Pos.
61	Charly Gaul (LUX)	3
62	Frans Gelhausen (LUX)	DNF
63	Willy Kemp (LUX)	60
64	Nicolas Morin (LUX)	DNF
65	Alfred Kain (AUT)	DNF
66	Kurt Schneider (AUT)	50
67	Heinz Müller (FRG)	DNF
68	Gunther Pankoke (FRG)	37
69	John Beasley (AUS)	DNF
70	Russell Mockridge (AUS)	64

Switzerland
No.	Rider	Pos.
71	Jacky Bovay (SUI)	53
72	Carlo Clerici (SUI)	DNF
73	Emilio Croci-Torti (SUI)	DNF
74	Rolf Graf (SUI)	DNF
75	Hans Hollenstein (SUI)	48
76	Marcel Huber (SUI)	DNF
77	Ferdinand Kübler (SUI)	DNF
78	Otto Meili (SUI)	DNF
79	Ernst Rudolf (SUI)	67
80	Max Schellenberg (SUI)	61

France – Île-de-France
No.	Rider	Pos.
81	Nicolas Barone (FRA)	56
82	Stanislas Bober (FRA)	DNF
83	Louis Caput (FRA)	54
84	Jean Dacquay (FRA)	38
85	Maurice Diot (FRA)	DNF
86	Dominique Forlini (FRA)	DNF
87	Raymond Hoorelbeke (FRA)	31
88	Francis Siguenza (FRA)	44
89	Eugène Telotte (FRA)	DNF
90	Isaac Vitré (FRA)	DNF

France – North-East/Centre
No.	Rider	Pos.
91	Ugo Anzile (FRA)	33
92	Gilbert Bauvin (FRA)	18
93	Roger Buchonnet (FRA)	51
94	Jean-Marie Cieleska (FRA)	47
95	Max Cohen (FRA)	63
96	Roger Hassenforder (FRA)	DNF
97	Raymond Reisser (FRA)	DNF
98	Gilbert Scodeller (FRA)	DNF
99	Jean Stablinski (FRA)	35
100	Roger Walkowiak (FRA)	DNF

France – West
No.	Rider	Pos.
101	Albert Bouvet (FRA)	DNF
102	Bernard Bultel (FRA)	DNF
103	Claude Colette (FRA)	24
104	Claude Le Ber (FRA)	DNF
105	Fernand Picot (FRA)	DNF
106	Maurice Quentin (FRA)	11
107	Jean Robic (FRA)	DNF
108	Pierre Ruby (FRA)	62
109	Henri Sitek (FRA)	68
110	Robert Varnajo (FRA)	DNF

France – South-East
No.	Rider	Pos.
111	Adolphe Deledda (FRA)	DNF
112	Armand Di Caro (FRA)	66
113	Nello Lauredi (FRA)	DNF
114	Apo Lazaridès (FRA)	39
115	Lucien Lazaridès (FRA)	58
116	René Genin (FRA)	59
117	Pierre Molinéris (FRA)	DNF
118	Raoul Rémy (FRA)	DNF
119	Lucien Teisseire (FRA)	45
120	Vincent Vitetta (FRA)	16

France – South-West
No.	Rider	Pos.
121	Philippe Agut (FRA)	52
122	Louis Bergaud (FRA)	DNF
123	Robert Desbats (FRA)	DNF
124	Jacques Dupont (FRA)	DNF
125	André Dupré (FRA)	DNF
126	Marcel Fernandez (FRA)	DNF
127	Georges Gay (FRA)	43
128	Valentin Huot (FRA)	DNF
129	Maurice Lampre (FRA)	DNF
130	Jacques Vivier (FRA)	DNF

=== By rider ===
Legend
No.	Starting number worn by the rider during the Tour
Pos.	Position in the general classification
DNF	Denotes a rider who did not finish

No.	Name	Nationality	Team	Pos.	Ref
1	Louison Bobet	France	France	1	
2	Jean Bobet	France	France	14	
3	André Darrigade	France	France	49	
4	Jean Dotto	France	France	DNF	
5	Jean Forestier	France	France	32	
6	Bernard Gauthier	France	France	46	
7	Raphaël Géminiani	France	France	6	
8	François Mahé	France	France	10	
9	Jean Malléjac	France	France	DNF	
10	Antonin Rolland	France	France	5	
11	Jan Adriaensens	Belgium	Belgium	28	
12	Jean Brankart	Belgium	Belgium	2	
13	Alexandre Close	Belgium	Belgium	9	
14	Hilaire Couvreur	Belgium	Belgium	DNF	
15	Fred De Bruyne	Belgium	Belgium	17	
16	Raymond Impanis	Belgium	Belgium	13	
17	Stan Ockers	Belgium	Belgium	8	
18	Edgard Sorgeloos	Belgium	Belgium	DNF	
19	Richard Van Genechten	Belgium	Belgium	DNF	
20	Rik Van Steenbergen	Belgium	Belgium	55	
21	Francisco Alomar Florit	Spain	Spain	DNF	
22	Salvador Botella	Spain	Spain	DNF	
23	Gabriel Company	Spain	Spain	57	
24	Antonio Gelabert	Spain	Spain	DNF	
25	Jesús Loroño	Spain	Spain	20	
26	Francisco Massip	Spain	Spain	DNF	
27	José Mateo	Spain	Spain	65	
28	Carmelo Morales	Spain	Spain	DNF	
29	Miguel Poblet	Spain	Spain	26	
30	Bernardo Ruiz	Spain	Spain	22	
31	Dave Bedwell	Great Britain	Great Britain	DNF	
32	Tony Hoar	Great Britain	Great Britain	69	
33	Stan Jones	Great Britain	Great Britain	DNF	
34	Fred Krebs	Great Britain	Great Britain	DNF	
35	Bob Maitland	Great Britain	Great Britain	DNF	
36	Ken Mitchell	Great Britain	Great Britain	DNF	
37	Bernard Pusey	Great Britain	Great Britain	DNF	
38	Brian Robinson	Great Britain	Great Britain	29	
39	Ian Steel	Great Britain	Great Britain	DNF	
40	Bevis Wood	Great Britain	Great Britain	DNF	
41	Daan de Groot	Netherlands	Netherlands	36	
42	Piet Haan	Netherlands	Netherlands	DNF	
43	Jos Hinsen	Netherlands	Netherlands	41	
44	Jan Nolten	Netherlands	Netherlands	21	
45	Hein van Breenen	Netherlands	Netherlands	27	
46	Wies van Dongen	Netherlands	Netherlands	DNF	
47	Wim van Est	Netherlands	Netherlands	15	
48	Adrie Voorting	Netherlands	Netherlands	DNF	
49	Gerrit Voorting	Netherlands	Netherlands	DNF	
50	Wout Wagtmans	Netherlands	Netherlands	19	
51	Giancarlo Astrua	Italy	Italy	7	
52	Denilo Barozzi	Italy	Italy	40	
53	Rino Benedetti	Italy	Italy	42	
54	Eugenio Bertoglio	Italy	Italy	DNF	
55	Agostino Coletto	Italy	Italy	12	
56	Alessandro Fantini	Italy	Italy	25	
57	Pasquale Fornara	Italy	Italy	4	
58	Pietro Giudici	Italy	Italy	30	
59	Bruno Monti	Italy	Italy	23	
60	Luciano Pezzi	Italy	Italy	34	
61	Charly Gaul	Luxembourg	Luxembourg/International	3	
62	Frans Gelhausen	Luxembourg	Luxembourg/International	DNF	
63	Willy Kemp	Luxembourg	Luxembourg/International	60	
64	Nicolas Morn	Luxembourg	Luxembourg/International	DNF	
65	Alfred Kain	Austria	Luxembourg/International	DNF	
66	Kurt Schneider	Austria	Luxembourg/International	50	
67	Heinz Müller	West Germany	Luxembourg/International	DNF	
68	Günther Pankoke	West Germany	Luxembourg/International	37	
69	John Beasley	Australia	Luxembourg/International	DNF	
70	Russell Mockridge	Australia	Luxembourg/International	64	
71	Jacky Bovay	Switzerland	Switzerland	53	
72	Carlo Clerici	Switzerland	Switzerland	DNF	
73	Emilio Croci-Torti	Switzerland	Switzerland	DNF	
74	Rolf Graf	Switzerland	Switzerland	DNF	
75	Hans Hollenstein	Switzerland	Switzerland	48	
76	Marcel Huber	Switzerland	Switzerland	DNF	
77	Ferdinand Kübler	Switzerland	Switzerland	DNF	
78	Otto Meili	Switzerland	Switzerland	DNF	
79	Ernst Rudolf	Switzerland	Switzerland	67	
80	Max Schellenberg	Switzerland	Switzerland	61	
81	Nicolas Barone	France	France – Île-de-France	56	
82	Stanislas Bober	France	France – Île-de-France	DNF	
83	Louis Caput	France	France – Île-de-France	54	
84	Jean Dacquay	France	France – Île-de-France	38	
85	Maurice Diot	France	France – Île-de-France	DNF	
86	Dominique Forlini	France	France – Île-de-France	DNF	
87	Raymond Hoorelbeke	France	France – Île-de-France	31	
88	Francis Siguenza	France	France – Île-de-France	44	
89	Eugène Telotte	France	France – Île-de-France	DNF	
90	Isaac Vitré	France	France – Île-de-France	DNF	
91	Ugo Anzile	France	France – North-East/Centre	33	
92	Gilbert Bauvin	France	France – North-East/Centre	18	
93	Roger Buchonnet	France	France – North-East/Centre	51	
94	Jean-Marie Cieleska	France	France – North-East/Centre	47	
95	Max Cohen	France	France – North-East/Centre	63	
96	Roger Hassenforder	France	France – North-East/Centre	DNF	
97	Raymond Reisser	France	France – North-East/Centre	DNF	
98	Gilbert Scodeller	France	France – North-East/Centre	DNF	
99	Jean Stablinski	France	France – North-East/Centre	35	
100	Roger Walkowiak	France	France – North-East/Centre	DNF	
101	Albert Bouvet	France	France – West	DNF	
102	Bernard Bultel	France	France – West	DNF	
103	Claude Colette	France	France – West	24	
104	Claude Le Ber	France	France – West	DNF	
105	Fernand Picot	France	France – West	DNF	
106	Maurice Quentin	France	France – West	11	
107	Jean Robic	France	France – West	DNF	
108	Pierre Ruby	France	France – West	62	
109	Henri Sitek	France	France – West	68	
110	Robert Varnajo	France	France – West	DNF	
111	Adolphe Deledda	France	France – South-East	DNF	
112	Armand Di Caro	France	France – South-East	66	
113	Nello Lauredi	France	France – South-East	DNF	
114	Apo Lazaridès	France	France – South-East	39	
115	Lucien Lazaridès	France	France – South-East	58	
116	René Genin	France	France – South-East	59	
117	Pierre Molinéris	France	France – South-East	DNF	
118	Raoul Rémy	France	France – South-East	DNF	
119	Lucien Teisseire	France	France – South-East	45	
120	Vincent Vitetta	France	France – South-East	16	
121	Philippe Agut	France	France – South-West	52	
122	Louis Bergaud	France	France – South-West	DNF	
123	Robert Desbats	France	France – South-West	DNF	
124	Jacques Dupont	France	France – South-West	DNF	
125	André Dupré	France	France – South-West	DNF	
126	Marcel Fernandez	France	France – South-West	DNF	
127	Georges Gay	France	France – South-West	43	
128	Valentin Huot	France	France – South-West	DNF	
129	Maurice Lampre	France	France – South-West	DNF	
130	Jacques Vivier	France	France – South-West	DNF	
