= 1954 Tour de France, Stage 1 to Stage 12 =

Cycling race stages

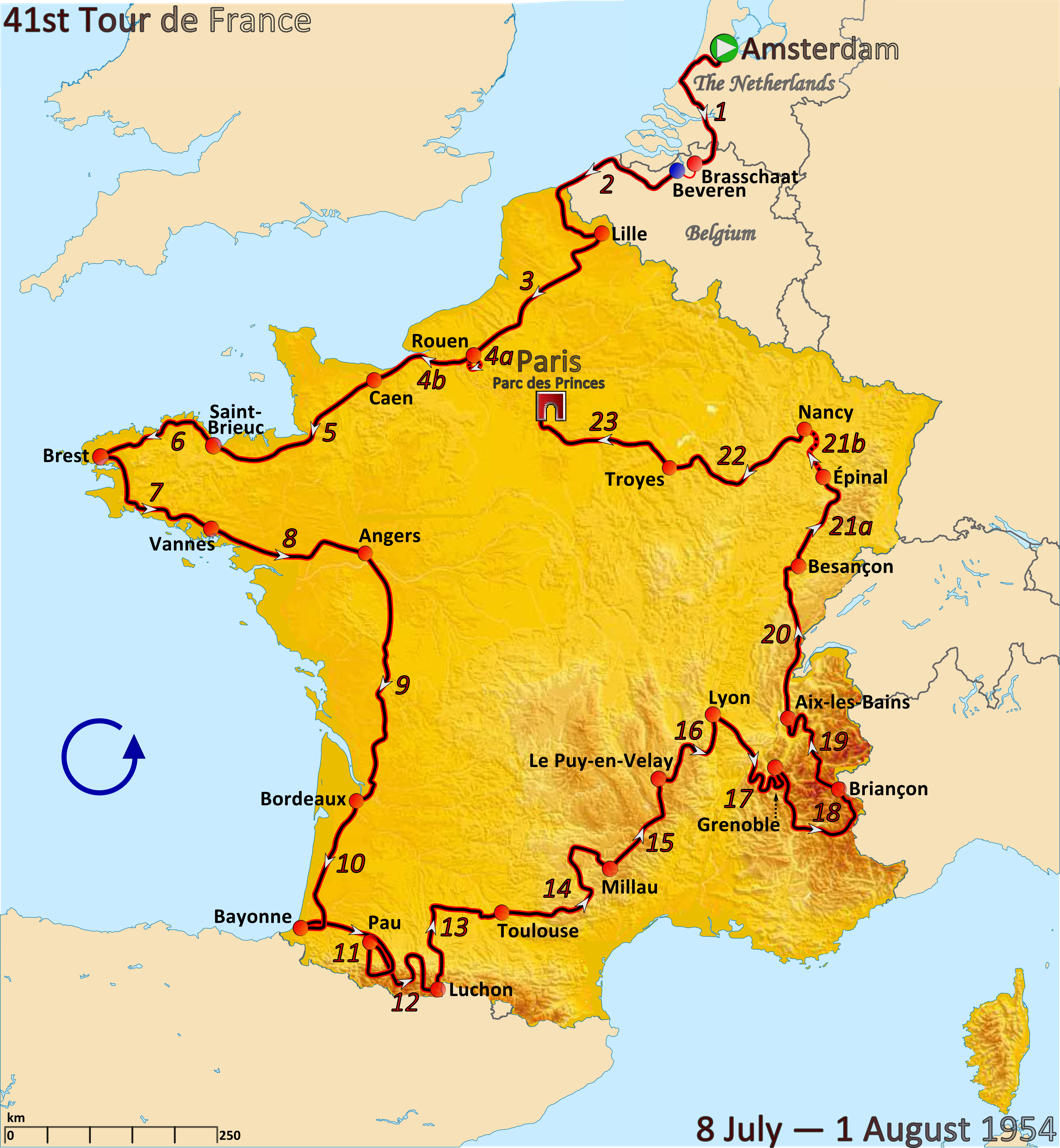
Route of the 1954 Tour de France

The 1954 Tour de France was the 41st edition of Tour de France, one of cycling's Grand Tours. The Tour began in Amsterdam with a flat stage on 8 July and Stage 12 occurred on 20 July with a mountainous stage to Luchon. The race finished in Paris on 1 August.

== Stage 1 ==
8 July 1954 - Amsterdam to Brasschaat, 216 km (134.2 mi) (individual time trial)

Stage 1 result

Rank	Rider	Team	Time
1	Wout Wagtmans (NED)	Netherlands	5h 23' 27"
2	Gilbert Bauvin (FRA)	France – North-East/Centre	+ 1"
3	Stan Ockers (BEL)	Belgium	s.t.
4	Marcel Hendrickx (BEL)	Belgium	s.t.
5	Louison Bobet (FRA)	France	s.t.
6	Adolphe Deledda (FRA)	France	s.t.
7	Wim van Est (NED)	Netherlands	s.t.
8	Kurt Schneider (AUT)	Luxembourg/Austria	s.t.
9	Gerrit Voorting (NED)	Netherlands	s.t.
10	René De Smet (BEL)	Belgium	s.t.

General classification after stage 1

Rank	Rider	Team	Time
1	Wout Wagtmans (NED)	Netherlands	5h 22' 27"
2	Gilbert Bauvin (FRA)	France – North-East/Centre	+ 31"
3	Stan Ockers (BEL)	Belgium	+ 1' 01"
4	Marcel Hendrickx (BEL)	Belgium	s.t.
5	Louison Bobet (FRA)	France	s.t.
6	Adolphe Deledda (FRA)	France	s.t.
7	Wim van Est (NED)	Netherlands	s.t.
8	Kurt Schneider (AUT)	Luxembourg/Austria	s.t.
9	Gerrit Voorting (NED)	Netherlands	s.t.
10	René De Smet (BEL)	Belgium	s.t.

== Stage 2 ==
9 July 1954 - Beveren to Lille, 255 km (158.4 mi)

Stage 2 result

Rank	Rider	Team	Time
1	Louison Bobet (FRA)	France	6h 51' 52"
2	Ferdinand Kübler (SUI)	Switzerland	s.t.
3	Hugo Koblet (SUI)	Switzerland	s.t.
4	Gilbert Bauvin (FRA)	France – North-East/Centre	s.t.
5	Wout Wagtmans (NED)	Netherlands	+ 1' 39"
6	Jean Robic (FRA)	France – West	s.t.
7	Raphaël Géminiani (FRA)	France	s.t.
8	Fritz Schär (SUI)	Switzerland	+ 10"
9	Charly Gaul (LUX)	Luxembourg/Austria	+ 13"
10	Jean Forestier (FRA)	France	+ 28"

General classification after stage 2

Rank	Rider	Team	Time
1	Wout Wagtmans (NED)	Netherlands	12h 14' 19"
2	Louison Bobet (FRA)	France	+ 1"
3	Gilbert Bauvin (FRA)	France – North-East/Centre	+ 31"
4	Hugo Koblet (SUI)	Switzerland	+ 1' 01"
5	Jean Robic (FRA)	France – West	s.t.
6	Fritz Schär (SUI)	Switzerland	+ 1' 11"
7	Wim van Est (NED)	Netherlands	+ 6' 19"
8	Adolphe Deledda (FRA)	France	+ 6' 37"
9	Stan Ockers (BEL)	Belgium	+ 6' 45"
10	Kurt Schneider (AUT)	Luxembourg/Austria	s.t.

== Stage 3 ==
10 July 1954 - Lille to Rouen, 219 km (136 mi)

Stage 3 result

Rank	Rider	Team	Time
1	Marcel Dussault (FRA)	France – South-West	6h 19' 52"
2	Georges Meunier (FRA)	France – North-East/Centre	+ 2"
3	Richard Van Genechten (BEL)	Belgium	s.t.
4	Francisco Alomar (ESP)	Spain	+ 1' 35"
5	Dominique Forlini (FRA)	France – Île-de-France	+ 1' 39"
6	Ferdinand Kübler (SUI)	Switzerland	s.t.
7	Gilbert Bauvin (FRA)	France – North-East/Centre	s.t.
8	Henk Faanhof (NED)	Netherlands	s.t.
9	Jean Robic (FRA)	France – West	s.t.
10	Hugo Koblet (SUI)	Switzerland	s.t.

General classification after stage 3

Rank	Rider	Team	Time
1	Wout Wagtmans (NED)	Netherlands	18h 35' 50"
2	Louison Bobet (FRA)	France	+ 1"
3	Gilbert Bauvin (FRA)	France – North-East/Centre	+ 31"
4	Hugo Koblet (SUI)	Switzerland	+ 1' 01"
5	Jean Robic (FRA)	France – West	s.t.
6	Fritz Schär (SUI)	Switzerland	+ 1' 11"
7	Wim van Est (NED)	Netherlands	+ 6' 19"
8	Adolphe Deledda (FRA)	France	+ 6' 37"
9	Francisco Alomar (ESP)	Spain	+ 6' 41"
10	Stan Ockers (BEL)	Belgium	+ 6' 45"

== Stage 4a ==
11 July 1954 - Rouen to Circuit des Essarts, 10.4 km (6.5 mi) (TTT)

Stage 4a result

Rank	Team	Time
1	Switzerland	45' 13"
2	France	+ 47"
3	France – West	+ 1' 44"
4	Spain	+ 1' 53"
5	Belgium	+ 1' 56"
6	France – North-East/Centre	+ 2' 07"
7	Netherlands	+ 2' 11"
8	France – South-East	+ 2' 32"
9	France – Île-de-France	+ 2' 54"
10	France – South-West	+ 3' 41"

General classification after stage 4a

Rank	Rider	Team	Time
1	Louison Bobet (FRA)	France	18h 51' 02"
2	Wout Wagtmans (NED)	Netherlands	+ 35"
3	Hugo Koblet (SUI)	Switzerland	+ 51"
4	Gilbert Bauvin (FRA)	France – North-East/Centre	+ 59"
5	Fritz Schär (SUI)	Switzerland	+ 1' 01"
6	Jean Robic (FRA)	France – West	+ 1' 26"
7	Wim van Est (NED)	Netherlands	+ 6' 54"
8	Adolphe Deledda (FRA)	France	+ 6' 58"
9	Francisco Alomar (ESP)	Spain	+ 7' 14"
10	Stan Ockers (BEL)	Belgium	+ 7' 16"

== Stage 4b ==
11 July 1954 - Rouen to Caen, 131 km (81 mi)

Stage 4b result

Rank	Rider	Team	Time
1	Wim van Est (NED)	Netherlands	3h 16' 03"
2	Charly Gaul (LUX)	Luxembourg/Austria	+ 3' 13"
3	Jan Nolten (NED)	Netherlands	+ 3' 46"
4	Maurice Quentin (FRA)	France – Île-de-France	s.t.
5	André Darrigade (FRA)	France	+ 4' 08"
6	Gilbert Bauvin (FRA)	France – North-East/Centre	s.t.
7	Fritz Schär (SUI)	Switzerland	s.t.
8	Germain Derycke (BEL)	Belgium	s.t.
9	Louis Caput (FRA)	France – South-West	s.t.
10	Hugo Koblet (SUI)	Switzerland	s.t.

General classification after stage 4b

Rank	Rider	Team	Time
1	Louison Bobet (FRA)	France	22h 11' 23"
2	Wout Wagtmans (NED)	Netherlands	+ 35"
3	Hugo Koblet (SUI)	Switzerland	+ 51"
4	Gilbert Bauvin (FRA)	France – North-East/Centre	+ 59"
5	Fritz Schär (SUI)	Switzerland	+ 1' 01"
6	Jean Robic (FRA)	France – West	+ 1' 26"
7	Wim van Est (NED)	Netherlands	+ 1' 47"
8	Adolphe Deledda (FRA)	France	+ 6' 58"
9	Francisco Alomar (ESP)	Spain	+ 7' 14"
10	Stan Ockers (BEL)	Belgium	+ 7' 16"

== Stage 5 ==
12 July 1954 - Caen to Saint-Brieuc, 224 km (139 mi)

Stage 5 result

Rank	Rider	Team	Time
1	Ferdinand Kübler (SUI)	Switzerland	6h 04' 06"
2	Adolphe Deledda (FRA)	France	s.t.
3	Hein van Breenen (NED)	Netherlands	s.t.
4	Georges Gilles (FRA)	France – West	s.t.
5	Fred De Bruyne (BEL)	Belgium	s.t.
6	Andrés Trobat (ESP)	Spain	s.t.
7	Jean Stablinski (FRA)	France – North-East/Centre	s.t.
8	Maurice Quentin (FRA)	France – Île-de-France	s.t.
9	Vincent Vitetta (FRA)	France – South-East	s.t.
10	Marcel Dussault (FRA)	France – South-West	s.t.

General classification after stage 5

Rank	Rider	Team	Time
1	Louison Bobet (FRA)	France	28h 17' 38"
2	Wout Wagtmans (NED)	Netherlands	+ 35"
3	Hugo Koblet (SUI)	Switzerland	+ 51"
4	Gilbert Bauvin (FRA)	France – North-East/Centre	+ 59"
5	Fritz Schär (SUI)	Switzerland	+ 1' 01"
6	Wim van Est (NED)	Netherlands	+ 1' 47"
7	Adolphe Deledda (FRA)	France	+ 4' 09"
8	Ferdinand Kübler (SUI)	Switzerland	+ 6' 02"
9	Charly Gaul (LUX)	Luxembourg/Austria	+ 7' 04"
10	Francisco Alomar (ESP)	Spain	+ 7' 14"

== Stage 6 ==
13 July 1954 - Saint-Brieuc to Brest, 179 km (111 mi)

Stage 6 result

Rank	Rider	Team	Time
1	Dominique Forlini (FRA)	France – Île-de-France	4h 55' 09"
2	Hugo Koblet (SUI)	Switzerland	s.t.
3	Ferdinand Kübler (SUI)	Switzerland	s.t.
4	Fritz Schär (SUI)	Switzerland	+ 2"
5	Fred De Bruyne (BEL)	Belgium	s.t.
6	Louis Bergaud (FRA)	France – South-West	+ 4"
7	Emilio Rodríguez (ESP)	Spain	s.t.
8	René De Smet (BEL)	Belgium	s.t.
9	Louison Bobet (FRA)	France	s.t.
10	Jean Forestier (FRA)	France	+ 9"

General classification after stage 6

Rank	Rider	Team	Time
1	Louison Bobet (FRA)	France	33h 12' 51"
2	Hugo Koblet (SUI)	Switzerland	+ 17"
3	Fritz Schär (SUI)	Switzerland	+ 59"
4	Ferdinand Kübler (SUI)	Switzerland	+ 5' 58"
5	René De Smet (BEL)	Belgium	+ 7' 36"
6	Wout Wagtmans (NED)	Netherlands	+ 7' 52"
7	Gilbert Bauvin (FRA)	France – North-East/Centre	+ 8' 30"
8	Wim van Est (NED)	Netherlands	+ 9' 04"
9	Jean Forestier (FRA)	France	+ 10' 35"
10	Adolphe Deledda (FRA)	France	+ 11' 26"

== Stage 7 ==
14 July 1954 - Brest to Vannes, 211 km (131 mi)

Stage 7 result

Rank	Rider	Team	Time
1	Jacques Vivier (FRA)	France – South-West	5h 24' 22"
2	François Mahé (FRA)	France – West	s.t.
3	Dominique Forlini (FRA)	France – Île-de-France	s.t.
4	Ferdinand Kübler (SUI)	Switzerland	+ 8' 28"
5	Stan Ockers (BEL)	Belgium	s.t.
6	Fritz Schär (SUI)	Switzerland	s.t.
7	Wim van Est (NED)	Netherlands	s.t.
8	Alfons Van den Brande (BEL)	Belgium	s.t.
9	Louison Bobet (FRA)	France	s.t.
10	André Darrigade (FRA)	France	s.t.

General classification after stage 7

Rank	Rider	Team	Time
1	Louison Bobet (FRA)	France	38h 45' 41"
2	Hugo Koblet (SUI)	Switzerland	+ 17"
3	Fritz Schär (SUI)	Switzerland	+ 59"
4	Ferdinand Kübler (SUI)	Switzerland	+ 5' 58"
5	Dominique Forlini (FRA)	France – Île-de-France	+ 5' 27"
6	René De Smet (BEL)	Belgium	+ 6' 46"
7	Wout Wagtmans (NED)	Netherlands	+ 7' 52"
8	Gilbert Bauvin (FRA)	France – North-East/Centre	+ 8' 30"
9	Wim van Est (NED)	Netherlands	+ 9' 04"
10	Jean Forestier (FRA)	France	+ 10' 35"

== Stage 8 ==
15 July 1954 - Vannes to Angers, 190 km (120 mi)

Stage 8 result

Rank	Rider	Team	Time
1	Fred De Bruyne (BEL)	Belgium	4h 27' 04"
2	Wout Wagtmans (NED)	Netherlands	s.t.
3	Georges Meunier (FRA)	France – North-East/Centre	s.t.
4	Emilio Croci-Torti (SUI)	Switzerland	s.t.
5	Jean Stablinski (FRA)	France – North-East/Centre	s.t.
6	Joseph Mirando (FRA)	France – South-East	s.t.
7	Émile Guérinel (FRA)	France – West	s.t.
8	Marcel Dierkens (LUX)	Luxembourg/Austria	s.t.
9	Hein van Breenen (NED)	Netherlands	s.t.
10	Jean Brankart (BEL)	Belgium	s.t.

General classification after stage 8

Rank	Rider	Team	Time
1	Wout Wagtmans (NED)	Netherlands	43h 20' 07"
2	Louison Bobet (FRA)	France	+ 1' 02"
3	Hugo Koblet (SUI)	Switzerland	+ 1' 19"
4	Fritz Schär (SUI)	Switzerland	+ 2' 01"
5	Fred De Bruyne (BEL)	Belgium	+ 5' 27"
6	Ferdinand Kübler (SUI)	Switzerland	+ 7' 00"
7	Dominique Forlini (FRA)	France – Île-de-France	+ 7' 48"
8	René De Smet (BEL)	Belgium	+ 8' 38"
9	Gilbert Bauvin (FRA)	France – North-East/Centre	+ 9' 32"
10	Wim van Est (NED)	Netherlands	+ 10' 06"

== Stage 9 ==
16 July 1954 - Angers to Bordeaux, 343 km (213 mi)

Stage 9 result

Rank	Rider	Team	Time
1	Henk Faanhof (NED)	Netherlands	10h 03' 25"
2	Marcel Hendrickx (BEL)	Belgium	s.t.
3	Rolf Graf (SUI)	Switzerland	s.t.
4	Carlo Clerici (SUI)	Switzerland	s.t.
5	Nello Lauredi (FRA)	France	s.t.
6	François Mahé (FRA)	France – West	s.t.
7	Jan Nolten (NED)	Netherlands	s.t.
8	André Darrigade (FRA)	France	+ 6' 04"
9	Ferdinand Kübler (SUI)	Switzerland	s.t.
10	Stan Ockers (BEL)	Belgium	s.t.

General classification after stage 9

Rank	Rider	Team	Time
1	Wout Wagtmans (NED)	Netherlands	53h 29' 36"
2	Louison Bobet (FRA)	France	+ 1' 02"
3	Hugo Koblet (SUI)	Switzerland	+ 1' 19"
4	Fritz Schär (SUI)	Switzerland	+ 2' 01"
5	Fred De Bruyne (BEL)	Belgium	+ 5' 27"
6	Ferdinand Kübler (SUI)	Switzerland	+ 7' 00"
7	Dominique Forlini (FRA)	France – Île-de-France	+ 7' 48"
8	René De Smet (BEL)	Belgium	+ 8' 38"
9	Gilbert Bauvin (FRA)	France – North-East/Centre	+ 9' 32"
10	Wim van Est (NED)	Netherlands	+ 10' 06"

== Rest Day 1 ==
17 July 1954 - Bordeaux

== Stage 10 ==
18 July 1954 - Bordeaux to Bayonne, 202 km (126 mi)

Stage 10 result

Rank	Rider	Team	Time
1	Gilbert Bauvin (FRA)	France – North-East/Centre	4h 56' 45"
2	Maurice Quentin (FRA)	France – Île-de-France	+ 10"
3	Jean Stablinski (FRA)	France – North-East/Centre	s.t.
4	Émile Guérinel (FRA)	France – West	s.t.
5	François Mahé (FRA)	France – West	s.t.
6	Jan Nolten (NED)	Netherlands	+ 44"
7	Marcel De Mulder (BEL)	Belgium	+ 2' 50"
8	André Darrigade (FRA)	France	+ 5' 24"
9	Gerrit Voorting (NED)	Netherlands	s.t.
10	Jean Dacquay (FRA)	France – North-East/Centre	s.t.

General classification after stage 10

Rank	Rider	Team	Time
1	Wout Wagtmans (NED)	Netherlands	58h 34' 14"
2	Gilbert Bauvin (FRA)	France – North-East/Centre	+ 39"
3	Louison Bobet (FRA)	France	+ 1' 02"
4	Hugo Koblet (SUI)	Switzerland	+ 1' 19"
5	Fritz Schär (SUI)	Switzerland	+ 2' 01"
6	Fred De Bruyne (BEL)	Belgium	+ 5' 27"
7	Dominique Forlini (FRA)	France – Île-de-France	+ 6' 38"
8	Ferdinand Kübler (SUI)	Switzerland	+ 7' 00"
9	René De Smet (BEL)	Belgium	+ 8' 38"
10	François Mahé (FRA)	France – West	+ 9' 55"

== Stage 11 ==
19 July 1954 - Bayonne to Pau, 241 km (150 mi)

Stage 11 result

Rank	Rider	Team	Time
1	Stan Ockers (BEL)	Belgium	6h 54' 24"
2	Gilbert Bauvin (FRA)	France – North-East/Centre	s.t.
3	Ferdinand Kübler (SUI)	Switzerland	s.t.
4	Louison Bobet (FRA)	France	s.t.
5	Fritz Schär (SUI)	Switzerland	s.t.
6	Jan Nolten (NED)	Netherlands	s.t.
7	Jean Malléjac (FRA)	France – West	s.t.
8	Wout Wagtmans (NED)	Netherlands	s.t.
9	Richard Van Genechten (BEL)	Belgium	s.t.
10	Charly Gaul (LUX)	Luxembourg/Austria	s.t.

General classification after stage 11

Rank	Rider	Team	Time
1	Wout Wagtmans (NED)	Netherlands	65h 28' 38"
2	Gilbert Bauvin (FRA)	France – North-East/Centre	+ 9"
3	Louison Bobet (FRA)	France	+ 1' 02"
4	Fritz Schär (SUI)	Switzerland	+ 2' 01"
5	Hugo Koblet (SUI)	Switzerland	+ 3' 13"
6	Ferdinand Kübler (SUI)	Switzerland	+ 7' 00"
7	François Mahé (FRA)	France – West	+ 11' 49"
8	Wim van Est (NED)	Netherlands	+ 12' 00"
9	Stan Ockers (BEL)	Belgium	+ 12' 46"
10	Charly Gaul (LUX)	Luxembourg/Austria	+ 15' 37"

== Stage 12 ==
20 July 1954 - Pau to Luchon, 161 km (100 mi)

Stage 12 result

Rank	Rider	Team	Time
1	Gilbert Bauvin (FRA)	France – North-East/Centre	5h 27' 27"
2	Federico Bahamontes (ESP)	Spain	+ 1"
3	Jean Malléjac (FRA)	France – West	s.t.
4	Louison Bobet (FRA)	France	+ 1' 59"
5	Jan Nolten (NED)	Netherlands	+ 4' 35"
6	Jean Dotto (FRA)	France – South-East	+ 5' 30"
7	Richard Van Genechten (BEL)	Belgium	+ 6' 04"
8	Jean Le Guily (FRA)	France – Île-de-France	+ 7' 01"
9	Ferdinand Kübler (SUI)	Switzerland	s.t.
10	Louis Bergaud (FRA)	France – South-West	+ 7' 49"

General classification after stage 12

Rank	Rider	Team	Time
1	Gilbert Bauvin (FRA)	France – North-East/Centre	70h 55' 14"
2	Louison Bobet (FRA)	France	+ 3' 52"
3	Fritz Schär (SUI)	Switzerland	+ 13' 40"
4	Ferdinand Kübler (SUI)	Switzerland	+ 14' 52"
5	Wout Wagtmans (NED)	Netherlands	+ 19' 20"
6	Jean Malléjac (FRA)	France – West	+ 20' 16"
7	Jan Nolten (NED)	Netherlands	+ 22' 19"
8	Stan Ockers (BEL)	Belgium	+ 25' 47"
9	François Mahé (FRA)	France – West	+ 29' 15"
10	Vincent Vitetta (FRA)	France – South-East	+ 30' 07"
