= 1954 Tour de France, Stage 13 to Stage 23 =

Cycling race stages

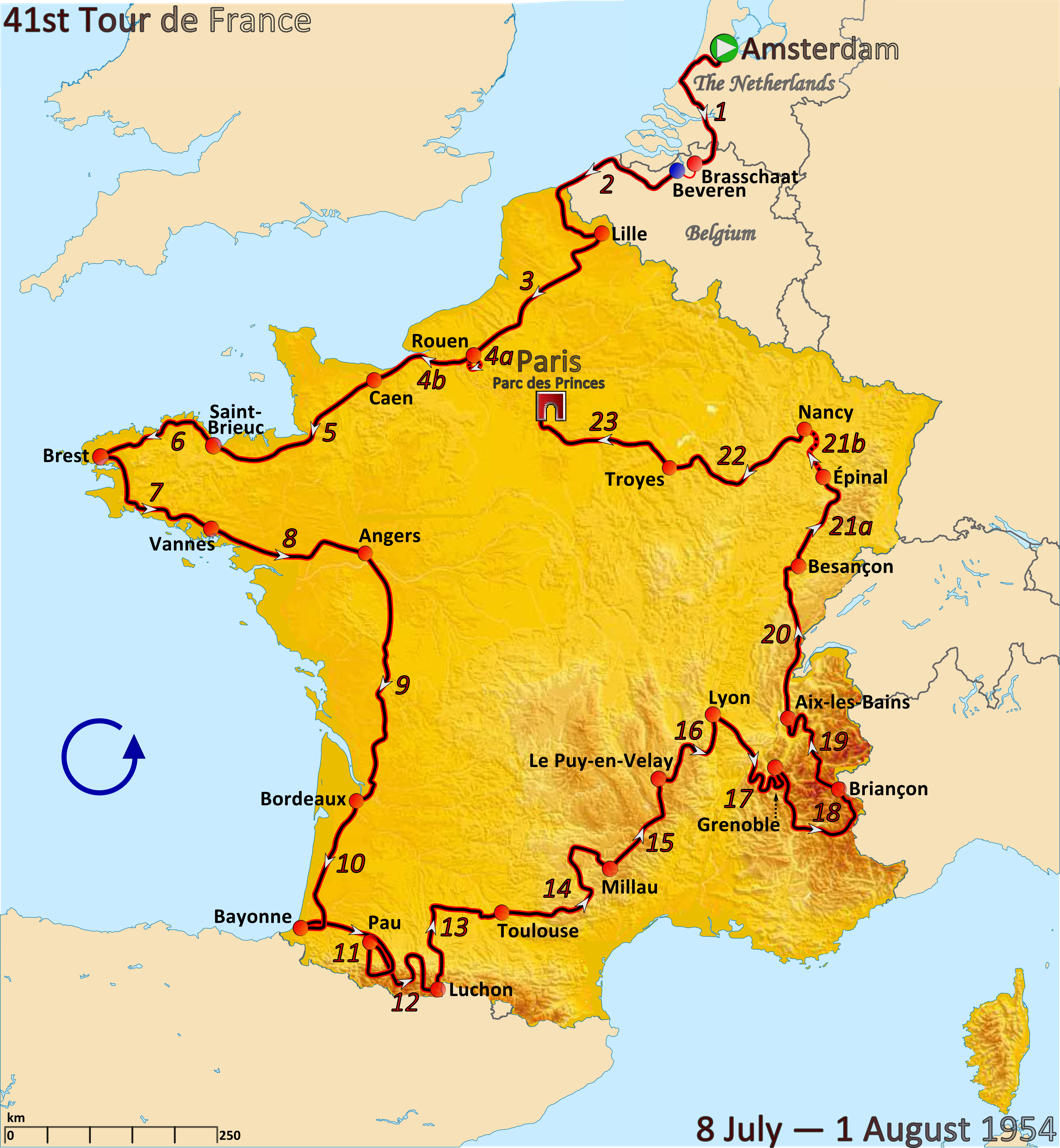
Route of the 1954 Tour de France

The 1954 Tour de France was the 41st edition of Tour de France, one of cycling's Grand Tours. The Tour began in Amsterdam with a flat stage on 8 July and Stage 13 occurred on 21 July with a flat stage from Luchon. The race finished in Paris on 1 August.

== Stage 13 ==
21 July 1954 - Luchon to Toulouse, 203 km (126.1 mi)

Stage 13 result

Rank	Rider	Team	Time
1	Fred De Bruyne (BEL)	Belgium	5h 19' 13"
2	René Privat (FRA)	France – South-West	s.t.
3	Jean Stablinski (FRA)	France – North-East/Centre	s.t.
4	Jean Dacquay (FRA)	France – North-East/Centre	+ 54"
5	Louis Bergaud (FRA)	France – South-West	s.t.
6	Joseph Mirando (FRA)	France – South-East	s.t.
7	Jean Dotto (FRA)	France – South-East	s.t.
8	Francisco Alomar (ESP)	Spain	s.t.
9	André Darrigade (FRA)	France	+ 5' 02"
10	Ferdinand Kübler (SUI)	Switzerland	s.t.

General classification after stage 13

Rank	Rider	Team	Time
1	Gilbert Bauvin (FRA)	France – North-East/Centre	76h 19' 29"
2	Louison Bobet (FRA)	France	+ 3' 52"
3	Fritz Schär (SUI)	Switzerland	+ 13' 40"
4	Ferdinand Kübler (SUI)	Switzerland	+ 14' 52"
5	Wout Wagtmans (NED)	Netherlands	+ 19' 20"
6	Jean Malléjac (FRA)	France – West	+ 20' 16"
7	Jan Nolten (NED)	Netherlands	+ 22' 19"
8	Stan Ockers (BEL)	Belgium	+ 25' 47"
9	Jean Dotto (FRA)	France – South-East	+ 28' 34"
10	François Mahé (FRA)	France – West	+ 29' 15"

== Stage 14 ==
22 July 1954 - Toulouse to Millau, 225 km (140 mi)

Stage 14 result

Rank	Rider	Team	Time
1	Ferdinand Kübler (SUI)	Switzerland	6h 32' 34"
2	Louison Bobet (FRA)	France	s.t.
3	Stan Ockers (BEL)	Belgium	s.t.
4	Raphaël Géminiani (FRA)	France	s.t.
5	Wim van Est (NED)	Netherlands	s.t.
6	Fritz Schär (SUI)	Switzerland	s.t.
7	Antonin Rolland (FRA)	France	s.t.
8	Jean Brankart (BEL)	Belgium	s.t.
9	Lucien Lazaridès (FRA)	France – South-East	s.t.
10	Gerrit Voorting (NED)	Netherlands	s.t.

General classification after stage 14

Rank	Rider	Team	Time
1	Louison Bobet (FRA)	France	82h 55' 25"
2	Gilbert Bauvin (FRA)	France – North-East/Centre	+ 4' 33"
3	Fritz Schär (SUI)	Switzerland	+ 10' 18"
4	Ferdinand Kübler (SUI)	Switzerland	+ 10' 30"
5	Wout Wagtmans (NED)	Netherlands	+ 15' 58"
6	Jean Malléjac (FRA)	France – West	+ 16' 54"
7	Jan Nolten (NED)	Netherlands	+ 18' 57"
8	Stan Ockers (BEL)	Belgium	+ 22' 25"
9	Jean Dotto (FRA)	France – South-East	+ 25' 12"
10	Louis Bergaud (FRA)	France – South-West	+ 26' 31"

== Stage 15 ==
23 July 1954 - Millau to Le Puy, 197 km (122 mi)

Stage 15 result

Rank	Rider	Team	Time
1	Dominique Forlini (FRA)	France – Île-de-France	6h 18' 13"
2	Gerrit Voorting (NED)	Netherlands	+ 2"
3	Stan Ockers (BEL)	Belgium	+ 3' 26"
4	Henk Faanhof (NED)	Netherlands	s.t.
5	Ferdinand Kübler (SUI)	Switzerland	s.t.
6	Jean-Marie Cieleska (FRA)	France – North-East/Centre	s.t.
7	Raphaël Géminiani (FRA)	France	s.t.
8	Wim van Est (NED)	Netherlands	s.t.
9	Fritz Schär (SUI)	Switzerland	s.t.
10	Raymond Hoorelbeke (FRA)	France – Île-de-France	s.t.

General classification after stage 15

Rank	Rider	Team	Time
1	Louison Bobet (FRA)	France	89h 17' 14"
2	Gilbert Bauvin (FRA)	France – North-East/Centre	+ 4' 33"
3	Fritz Schär (SUI)	Switzerland	+ 10' 18"
4	Ferdinand Kübler (SUI)	Switzerland	+ 10' 30"
5	Wout Wagtmans (NED)	Netherlands	+ 15' 58"
6	Jean Malléjac (FRA)	France – West	+ 16' 54"
7	Jan Nolten (NED)	Netherlands	+ 18' 57"
8	Stan Ockers (BEL)	Belgium	+ 22' 25"
9	Jean Dotto (FRA)	France – South-East	+ 25' 12"
10	Louis Bergaud (FRA)	France – South-West	+ 26' 31"

== Stage 16 ==
24 July 1954 - Le Puy to Lyon, 194 km (121 mi)

Stage 16 result

Rank	Rider	Team	Time
1	Jean Forestier (FRA)	France	5h 28' 58"
2	Hein van Breenen (NED)	Netherlands	s.t.
3	Vincent Vitetta (FRA)	France – South-East	s.t.
4	Marcel De Mulder (BEL)	Belgium	s.t.
5	Nello Lauredi (FRA)	France	s.t.
6	Carlo Clerici (SUI)	Switzerland	s.t.
7	Jean Dotto (FRA)	France – South-East	s.t.
8	Ferdinand Kübler (SUI)	Switzerland	+ 5' 08"
9	Fritz Schär (SUI)	Switzerland	s.t.
10	Stan Ockers (BEL)	Belgium	s.t.

General classification after stage 16

Rank	Rider	Team	Time
1	Louison Bobet (FRA)	France	94h 51' 20"
2	Fritz Schär (SUI)	Switzerland	+ 10' 18"
3	Ferdinand Kübler (SUI)	Switzerland	+ 10' 30"
4	Jean Malléjac (FRA)	France – West	+ 16' 54"
5	Gilbert Bauvin (FRA)	France – North-East/Centre	+ 19' 28"
6	Jean Dotto (FRA)	France – South-East	+ 20' 04"
7	Vincent Vitetta (FRA)	France – South-East	+ 21' 37"
8	Stan Ockers (BEL)	Belgium	+ 22' 25"
9	Nello Lauredi (FRA)	France	+ 23' 07"
10	Louis Bergaud (FRA)	France – South-West	+ 26' 31"

== Rest Day 2 ==
25 July 1954 - Lyon

== Stage 17 ==
26 July 1954 - Lyon to Grenoble, 182 km (113 mi)

Stage 17 result

Rank	Rider	Team	Time
1	Lucien Lazaridès (FRA)	France – South-East	5h 40' 43"
2	Fritz Schär (SUI)	Switzerland	+ 1' 21"
3	Ferdinand Kübler (SUI)	Switzerland	+ 1' 25"
4	Stan Ockers (BEL)	Belgium	s.t.
5	Louison Bobet (FRA)	France	s.t.
6	Hein van Breenen (NED)	Netherlands	s.t.
7	Carlo Clerici (SUI)	Switzerland	s.t.
8	Jean Malléjac (FRA)	France – West	s.t.
9	Emilio Rodríguez (ESP)	Spain	s.t.
10	Jean Dotto (FRA)	France – South-East	s.t.

General classification after stage 17

Rank	Rider	Team	Time
1	Louison Bobet (FRA)	France	100h 33' 28"
2	Fritz Schär (SUI)	Switzerland	+ 9' 44"
3	Ferdinand Kübler (SUI)	Switzerland	+ 10' 30"
4	Jean Malléjac (FRA)	France – West	+ 16' 54"
5	Jean Dotto (FRA)	France – South-East	+ 20' 04"
6	Stan Ockers (BEL)	Belgium	+ 22' 25"
7	Gilbert Bauvin (FRA)	France – North-East/Centre	+ 22' 36"
8	Vincent Vitetta (FRA)	France – South-East	+ 24' 26"
9	Nello Lauredi (FRA)	France	+ 26' 15"
10	Louis Bergaud (FRA)	France – South-West	+ 26' 31"

== Stage 18 ==
27 July 1954 - Grenoble to Briançon, 216 km (134 mi)

Stage 18 result

Rank	Rider	Team	Time
1	Louison Bobet (FRA)	France	7h 26' 42"
2	Ferdinand Kübler (SUI)	Switzerland	+ 1' 49"
3	Louis Bergaud (FRA)	France – South-West	+ 3' 12"
4	Wout Wagtmans (NED)	Netherlands	+ 4' 36"
5	Federico Bahamontes (ESP)	Spain	+ 4' 41"
6	Jean Dotto (FRA)	France – South-East	+ 5' 20"
7	Jean Malléjac (FRA)	France – West	+ 5' 21"
8	Nello Lauredi (FRA)	France	s.t.
9	Stan Ockers (BEL)	Belgium	+ 5' 22"
10	Jan Nolten (NED)	Netherlands	+ 6' 15"

General classification after stage 18

Rank	Rider	Team	Time
1	Louison Bobet (FRA)	France	107h 59' 10"
2	Ferdinand Kübler (SUI)	Switzerland	+ 12' 49"
3	Fritz Schär (SUI)	Switzerland	+ 17' 46"
4	Jean Malléjac (FRA)	France – West	+ 23' 15"
5	Jean Dotto (FRA)	France – South-East	+ 26' 24"
6	Stan Ockers (BEL)	Belgium	+ 28' 47"
7	Louis Bergaud (FRA)	France – South-West	+ 30' 43"
8	Vincent Vitetta (FRA)	France – South-East	+ 31' 59"
9	Nello Lauredi (FRA)	France	+ 32' 36"
10	Gilbert Bauvin (FRA)	France – North-East/Centre	+ 34' 33"

== Stage 19 ==
28 July 1954 - Briançon to Aix-les-Bains, 221 km (137 mi)

Stage 19 result

Rank	Rider	Team	Time
1	Jean Dotto (FRA)	France – South-East	7h 19' 20"
2	Bernardo Ruiz (ESP)	Spain	+ 3' 55"
3	Francisco Alomar (ESP)	Spain	+ 7' 59"
4	Ferdinand Kübler (SUI)	Switzerland	+ 8' 02"
5	Stan Ockers (BEL)	Belgium	s.t.
6	Vincent Vitetta (FRA)	France – South-East	s.t.
7	Jean Malléjac (FRA)	France – West	s.t.
8	Nello Lauredi (FRA)	France	s.t.
9	Louis Bergaud (FRA)	France – South-West	s.t.
10	Gerrit Voorting (NED)	Netherlands	s.t.

General classification after stage 19

Rank	Rider	Team	Time
1	Louison Bobet (FRA)	France	115h 26' 32"
2	Ferdinand Kübler (SUI)	Switzerland	+ 12' 49"
3	Jean Dotto (FRA)	France – South-East	+ 17' 22"
4	Fritz Schär (SUI)	Switzerland	+ 17' 46"
5	Jean Malléjac (FRA)	France – West	+ 23' 15"
6	Stan Ockers (BEL)	Belgium	+ 28' 47"
7	Louis Bergaud (FRA)	France – South-West	+ 30' 43"
8	Vincent Vitetta (FRA)	France – South-East	+ 31' 59"
9	Nello Lauredi (FRA)	France	+ 32' 36"
10	Gilbert Bauvin (FRA)	France – North-East/Centre	+ 34' 33"

== Stage 20 ==
29 July 1954 - Aix-les-Bains to Besançon, 243 km (151 mi)

Stage 20 result

Rank	Rider	Team	Time
1	Lucien Teisseire (FRA)	France	7h 05' 31"
2	Hein van Breenen (NED)	Netherlands	s.t.
3	Richard Van Genechten (BEL)	Belgium	s.t.
4	Antonin Rolland (FRA)	France	s.t.
5	Remo Pianezzi (SUI)	Switzerland	s.t.
6	François Mahé (FRA)	France – West	s.t.
7	Ferdinand Kübler (SUI)	Switzerland	+ 27"
8	Stan Ockers (BEL)	Belgium	s.t.
9	Jean Forestier (FRA)	France	s.t.
10	Fritz Schär (SUI)	Switzerland	s.t.

General classification after stage 20

Rank	Rider	Team	Time
1	Louison Bobet (FRA)	France	122h 32' 30"
2	Ferdinand Kübler (SUI)	Switzerland	+ 12' 49"
3	Jean Dotto (FRA)	France – South-East	+ 17' 22"
4	Fritz Schär (SUI)	Switzerland	+ 17' 46"
5	Jean Malléjac (FRA)	France – West	+ 23' 15"
6	Stan Ockers (BEL)	Belgium	+ 28' 47"
7	Louis Bergaud (FRA)	France – South-West	+ 30' 43"
8	Vincent Vitetta (FRA)	France – South-East	+ 31' 59"
9	Nello Lauredi (FRA)	France	+ 32' 36"
10	Gilbert Bauvin (FRA)	France – North-East/Centre	+ 34' 33"

== Stage 21a ==
30 July 1954 - Besançon to Épinal, 134 km (83 mi)

Stage 21a result

Rank	Rider	Team	Time
1	François Mahé (FRA)	France – West	3h 45' 48"
2	Marcel Hendrickx (BEL)	Belgium	+ 2"
3	André Darrigade (FRA)	France	s.t.
4	Dominique Forlini (FRA)	France – Île-de-France	s.t.
5	Emilio Croci-Torti (SUI)	Switzerland	s.t.
6	Lucien Lazaridès (FRA)	France – South-East	s.t.
7	Francisco Alomar (ESP)	Spain	s.t.
8	Kurt Schneider (AUT)	Luxembourg/Austria	+ 15' 07"
9	Stan Ockers (BEL)	Belgium	+ 15' 13"
10	Fritz Schär (SUI)	Switzerland	s.t.

General classification after stage 21a

Rank	Rider	Team	Time
1	Louison Bobet (FRA)	France	126h 33' 33"
2	Ferdinand Kübler (SUI)	Switzerland	+ 12' 49"
3	Jean Dotto (FRA)	France – South-East	+ 17' 22"
4	Fritz Schär (SUI)	Switzerland	+ 17' 46"
5	Jean Malléjac (FRA)	France – West	+ 23' 15"
6	Stan Ockers (BEL)	Belgium	+ 28' 47"
7	Louis Bergaud (FRA)	France – South-West	+ 30' 43"
8	Vincent Vitetta (FRA)	France – South-East	+ 31' 59"
9	Nello Lauredi (FRA)	France	+ 32' 36"
10	Gilbert Bauvin (FRA)	France – North-East/Centre	+ 34' 33"

== Stage 21b ==
30 July 1954 - Epinal to Nancy, 72 km (45 mi) (ITT)

Stage 21b result

Rank	Rider	Team	Time
1	Louison Bobet (FRA)	France	1h 47' 10"
2	Ferdinand Kübler (SUI)	Switzerland	+ 2' 30"
3	Fritz Schär (SUI)	Switzerland	+ 3' 00"
4	Jean Brankart (BEL)	Belgium	+ 3' 10"
5	Louis Bergaud (FRA)	France – South-West	+ 6' 12"
6	Stan Ockers (BEL)	Belgium	+ 6' 15"
7	Carlo Clerici (SUI)	Switzerland	+ 6' 37"
8	Gilbert Bauvin (FRA)	France – North-East/Centre	+ 6' 48"
9	Wim van Est (NED)	Netherlands	+ 7' 01"
10	Jean Malléjac (FRA)	France – West	+ 7' 23"

General classification after stage 21b

Rank	Rider	Team	Time
1	Louison Bobet (FRA)	France	128h 19' 43"
2	Ferdinand Kübler (SUI)	Switzerland	+ 15' 49"
3	Fritz Schär (SUI)	Switzerland	+ 21' 46"
4	Jean Dotto (FRA)	France – South-East	+ 28' 21"
5	Jean Malléjac (FRA)	France – West	+ 31' 38"
6	Stan Ockers (BEL)	Belgium	+ 36' 02"
7	Louis Bergaud (FRA)	France – South-West	+ 37' 55"
8	Vincent Vitetta (FRA)	France – South-East	+ 41' 14"
9	Jean Brankart (BEL)	Belgium	+ 42' 08"
10	Gilbert Bauvin (FRA)	France – North-East/Centre	+ 42' 21"

== Stage 22 ==
31 July 1954 - Nancy to Troyes, 216 km (134 mi)

Stage 22 result

Rank	Rider	Team	Time
1	Fred De Bruyne (BEL)	Belgium	6h 35' 03"
2	Emilio Croci-Torti (SUI)	Switzerland	s.t.
3	Adolphe Deledda (FRA)	France	+ 21"
4	Wim van Est (NED)	Netherlands	s.t.
5	Remo Pianezzi (SUI)	Switzerland	s.t.
6	Raymond Hoorelbeke (FRA)	France – Île-de-France	s.t.
7	Richard Van Genechten (BEL)	Belgium	s.t.
8	Marcel Hendrickx (BEL)	Belgium	s.t.
9	Dominique Forlini (FRA)	France – Île-de-France	s.t.
10	Émile Guérinel (FRA)	France – West	s.t.

General classification after stage 22

Rank	Rider	Team	Time
1	Louison Bobet (FRA)	France	134h 55' 25"
2	Ferdinand Kübler (SUI)	Switzerland	+ 15' 49"
3	Fritz Schär (SUI)	Switzerland	+ 21' 46"
4	Jean Dotto (FRA)	France – South-East	+ 28' 21"
5	Jean Malléjac (FRA)	France – West	+ 31' 38"
6	Stan Ockers (BEL)	Belgium	+ 36' 02"
7	Louis Bergaud (FRA)	France – South-West	+ 37' 55"
8	Vincent Vitetta (FRA)	France – South-East	+ 41' 14"
9	Jean Brankart (BEL)	Belgium	+ 42' 08"
10	Gilbert Bauvin (FRA)	France – North-East/Centre	+ 42' 21"

== Stage 23 ==
1 August 1954 - Troyes to Paris, 180 km (110 mi) (individual time trial)

Stage 23 result

Rank	Rider	Team	Time
1	Robert Varnajo (FRA)	France – West	5h 09' 23"
2	Fred De Bruyne (BEL)	Belgium	s.t.
3	Henk Faanhof (NED)	Netherlands	s.t.
4	Willy Kemp (LUX)	Luxembourg/Austria	s.t.
5	Stanislas Bober (FRA)	France – Île-de-France	s.t.
6	Dominique Forlini (FRA)	France – Île-de-France	+ 39"
7	Raymond Hoorelbeke (FRA)	France – Île-de-France	+ 1' 17"
8	Jean Brankart (BEL)	Belgium	s.t.
9	Antonin Rolland (FRA)	France	s.t.
10	Stan Ockers (BEL)	Belgium	s.t.

General classification after stage 23

Rank	Rider	Team	Time
1	Louison Bobet (FRA)	France	140h 06' 05"
2	Ferdinand Kübler (SUI)	Switzerland	+ 15' 49"
3	Fritz Schär (SUI)	Switzerland	+ 21' 46"
4	Jean Dotto (FRA)	France – South-East	+ 28' 21"
5	Jean Malléjac (FRA)	France – West	+ 31' 38"
6	Stan Ockers (BEL)	Belgium	+ 36' 02"
7	Louis Bergaud (FRA)	France – South-West	+ 37' 55"
8	Vincent Vitetta (FRA)	France – South-East	+ 41' 14"
9	Jean Brankart (BEL)	Belgium	+ 42' 08"
10	Gilbert Bauvin (FRA)	France – North-East/Centre	+ 42' 21"
