= Col Bayard =

Mountain pass in Hautes-Alpes, France

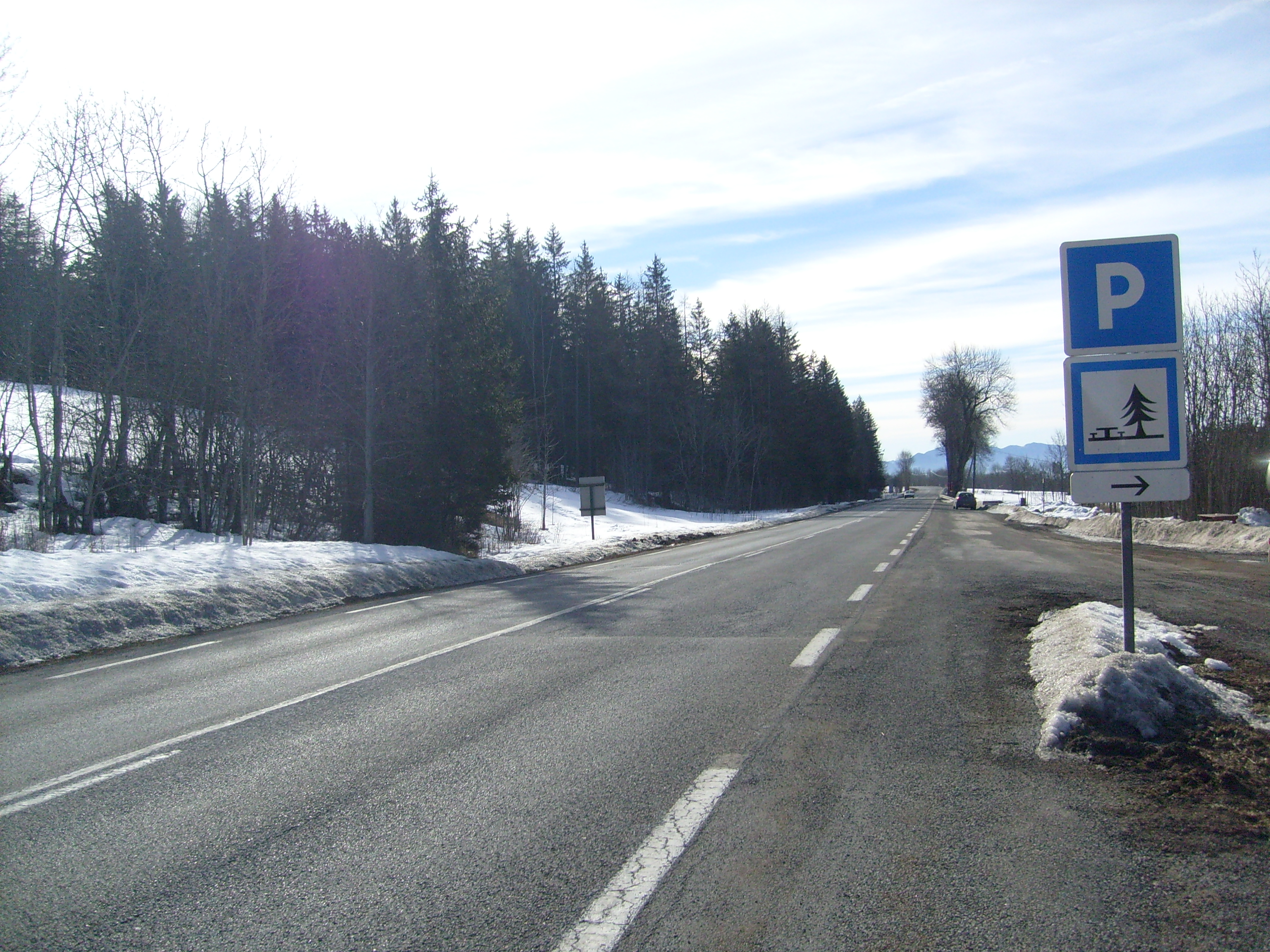
- col Bayard looking towards Gap

- Location within Alps
- Elevation: 1,246 m (4,088 ft)

Third Approach
- Location: Hautes-Alpes, France
- Range: Dauphiné Alps / Massif des Écrins
- Coordinates: 44°36′46″N 6°04′53″E

Col Bayard (1,246 m) is a mountain pass through the Dauphiné Alps in the department of Hautes-Alpes in France.

It connects the communities of La Mure and Gap.

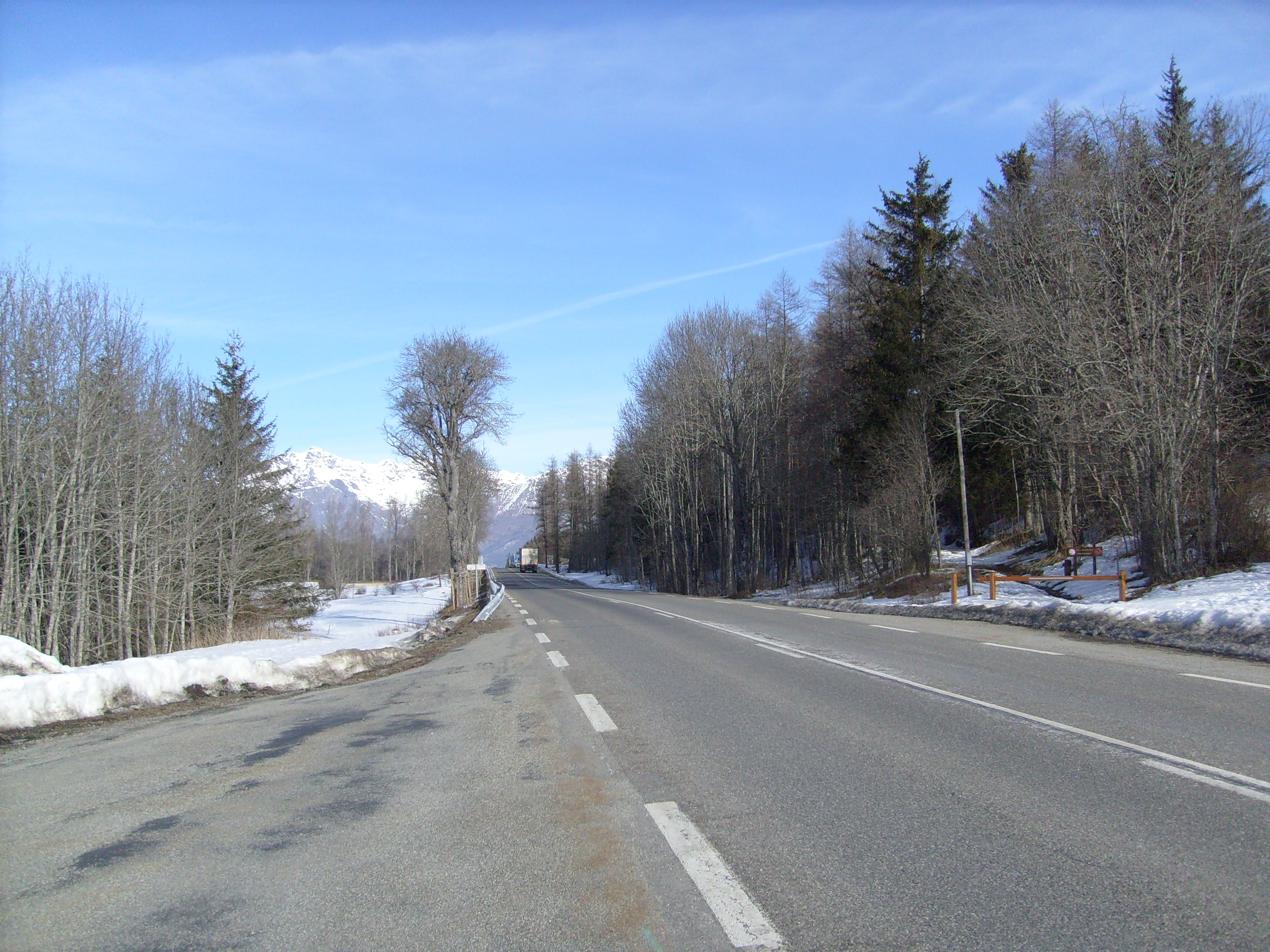
Le col Bayard looking in the direction of Champsaur

== Tour de France ==
Col Bayard was first used in the Tour de France in 1954 as a category 3 climb, when the leader over the summit was Federico Bahamontes. Overall, the Tour has passed the summit on five occasions, usually as a category 2 climb, including on Stage 19 of the 2026 Tour.

=== Appearances in Tour de France ===
Year	Stage	Category	Start	Finish	Leader at the summit
2026	19	2	Gap	Alpe d'Huez	Valentin Paret-Peintre (FRA)
2024	17	2	Saint-Paul-Trois-Châteaux	SuperDévoluy	Magnus Cort (DEN)
2015	18	2	Gap	Saint-Jean-de-Maurienne	Joaquim Rodríguez (ESP)
1991	17	2	Gap	Alpe d'Huez	Peio Ruiz Cabestany (ESP)
1954	18	3	Grenoble	Briançon	Federico Bahamontes (ESP)

== See also ==
- List of highest paved roads in Europe
- List of mountain passes
- Route Napoléon
