= Henri Surbatis =

French cyclist

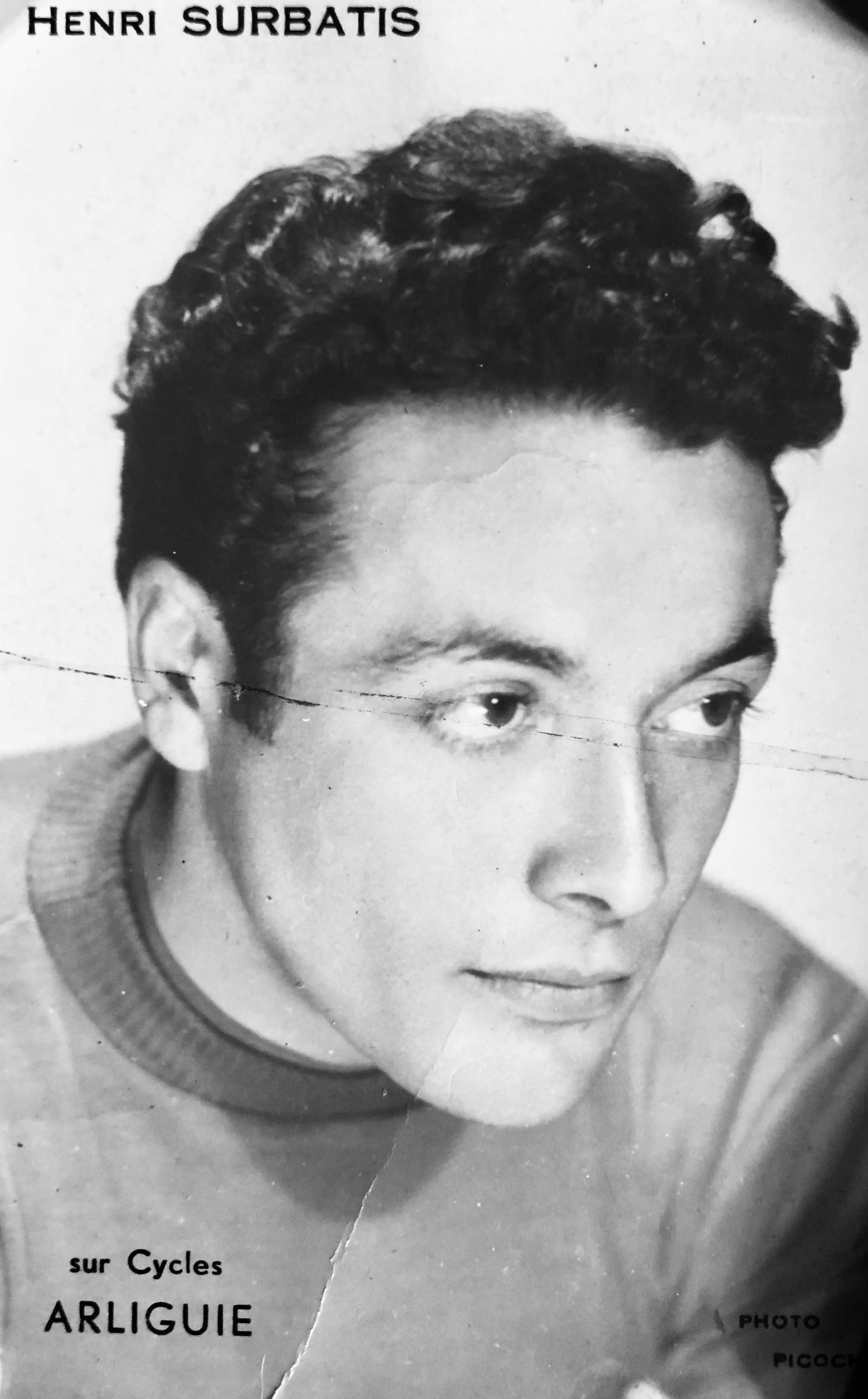
- Portrait of Henri Surbatis

Personal information
- Born: 23 June 1922 Paris, France
- Died: 5 May 2000 (aged 77) Le Kremlin-Bicêtre, France

Cycling career
- Sport: Cycling
- Role: Rider

Henri Surbatis (23 June 1922 – 5 May 2000) was a French racing cyclist. He rode in the 1954 Tour de France.
