= Kurt Urbancic =

Austrian cyclist

Personal information
- Born: 2 March 1929

Cycling career
- Sport: Cycling
- Role: Rider

Kurt Urbancic (born 2 March 1929) was an Austrian racing cyclist. He rode in the 1954 Tour de France.
