= Nico van Est =

Dutch cyclist

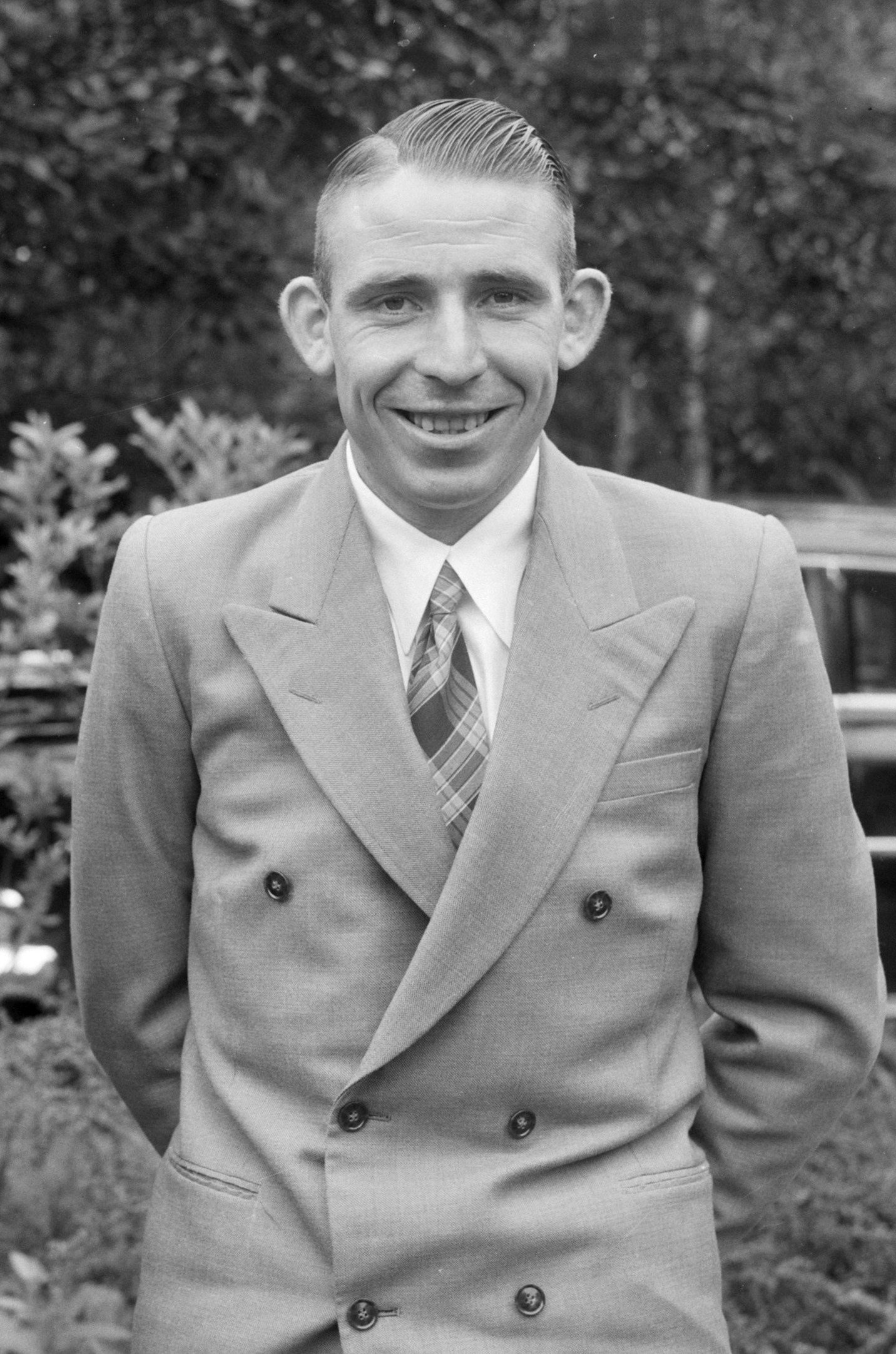
- Est in 1954

Personal information
- Born: 19 April 1928
- Died: 8 July 2009 (aged 81)

Cycling career
- Sport: Cycling
- Role: Rider

Nico van Est (19 April 1928 – 8 July 2009) was a Dutch racing cyclist. He rode in the 1954 Tour de France.
