= René Remangeon =

French cyclist (1931–2019)

Personal information
- Born: 16 November 1931
- Died: 23 March 2019 (aged 87)

Cycling career
- Sport: Cycling
- Role: Rider

René Remangeon (16 November 1931 – 23 March 2019) was a French racing cyclist. He rode in the 1954 Tour de France.
