= Bertram Seger =

Liechtenstein cyclist (1929–1978)

Personal information
- Born: 30 December 1929
- Died: 10 January 1978 (aged 48)

Cycling career
- Sport: Cycling
- Role: Rider

Bertram Seger (30 December 1929 – 10 January 1978) was a Liechtenstein racing cyclist. He rode in the 1954 Tour de France.
