= Joseph Cigana =

French cyclist (1932–2022)

Personal information
- Born: 14 September 1932
- Died: 2 December 2022 (aged 90)

Cycling career
- Sport: Cycling
- Role: Rider

Joseph Cigana (14 September 1932 – 2 December 2022) was a French racing cyclist. He rode in the 1954 Tour de France.

Cigana died on 2 December 2022.
