= François Gelhausen =

Luxembourgish cyclist

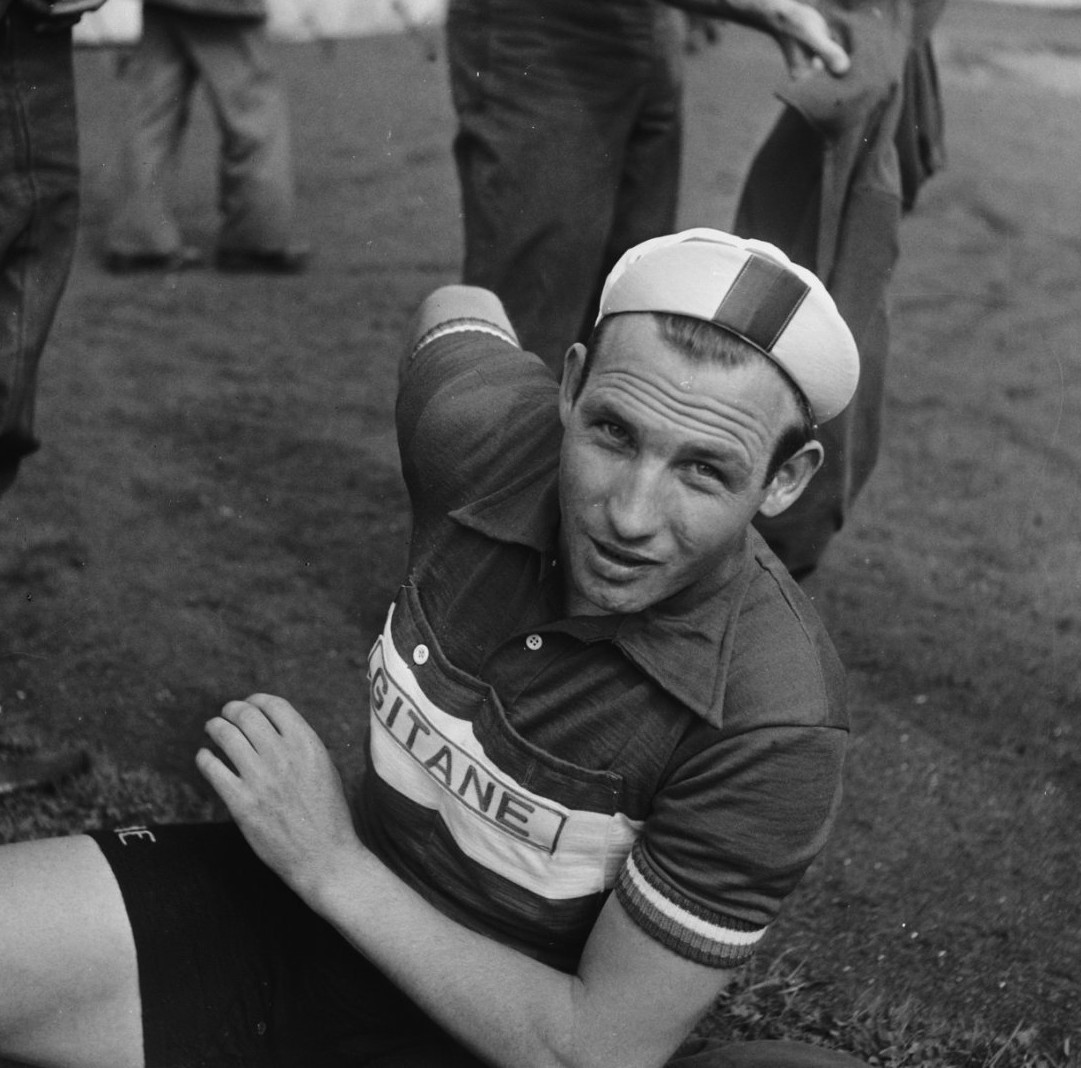

Personal information
- Born: 25 May 1930
- Died: 2 April 2001 (aged 70)

Cycling career
- Sport: Cycling
- Role: Rider

François Gelhausen (25 May 1930 – 2 April 2001) was a Luxembourgish racing cyclist. He rode in the 1954 Tour de France.
