= Armand Di Caro =

French cyclist

Personal information
- Born: 22 July 1931
- Died: 31 July 1993 (aged 62)

Cycling career
- Sport: Cycling
- Role: Rider

Armand Di Caro (22 July 1931 – 31 July 1993) was a French racing cyclist. He rode in the 1955 Tour de France.

== Professional career ==
In 1955, Di Caro participated in the 42nd edition of the Tour de France, representing the Mercier - BP - Hutchinson team.
