= Bevis Wood =

British cyclist

Personal information
- Born: 17 August 1929
- Died: 29 January 2006 (aged 76)

Cycling career
- Sport: Cycling
- Role: Rider

Bevis Wood (17 August 1929 – 29 January 2006) was a British racing cyclist. He rode in the 1955 Tour de France.
