= Eugenio Bertoglio =

Italian cyclist (1929–2020)

Personal information
- Born: 24 April 1929
- Died: 2020

Cycling career
- Sport: Cycling
- Role: Rider

Eugenio Bertoglio (24 April 1929 – 2020) was an Italian racing cyclist. He rode in the 1955 Tour de France.
