= René Genin =

French cyclist

Personal information
- Born: 2 July 1931 (age 95)

Cycling career
- Sport: Cycling
- Role: Rider

René Genin (born 2 July 1931) is a French racing cyclist. He rode in the 1955 Tour de France.
