= Raymond Reisser =

French cyclist

Personal information
- Born: 10 December 1930 Lyon, France
- Died: 4 April 2017 (aged 86)

Cycling career
- Sport: Cycling
- Role: Rider

Raymond Reisser (10 December 1930 – 4 April 2017) was a French professional racing cyclist. He rode in two editions of the Tour de France. He died on 4 April 2017.
