= Ernst Rudolf =

Swiss cyclist

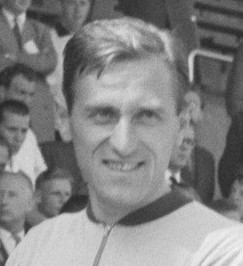

Personal information
- Born: 14 March 1926 Brüttelen, Switzerland

Cycling career
- Sport: Cycling
- Role: Rider

Ernst Rudolf (born 14 March 1926) was a Swiss racing cyclist. He rode in the 1955 Tour de France.
