= Fred Krebs =

British cyclist

Personal information
- Born: 23 November 1931
- Died: 30 November 1995 (aged 64)

Cycling career
- Sport: Cycling
- Role: Rider

Fred Krebs (23 November 1931 – 30 November 1995) was a British racing cyclist. He rode in the 1955 Tour de France.
