= Stan Jones (cyclist) =

British cyclist

Personal information
- Born: 10 June 1922
- Died: 12 July 1995 (aged 73)

Cycling career
- Sport: Cycling
- Role: Rider

Stan Jones (10 June 1922 – 12 July 1995) was a British racing cyclist. He rode in the 1955 Tour de France.
