= Piet Haan =

Dutch cyclist

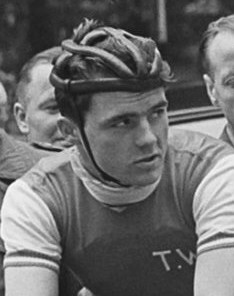

Personal information
- Born: 19 November 1930 Mechelen, Netherlands
- Died: 22 July 2017 (aged 86) Heerlen, Netherlands

Cycling career
- Sport: Cycling
- Discipline: Road
- Role: Rider

Professional teams
- 1953: Garin–Wolber
- 1954–1955: Locomotief–Vredestein
- 1955: Alpa
- 1956–1959: Locomotief–Vredestein

Piet Haan (19 November 1930 – 22 July 2017) was a Dutch racing cyclist. He rode in the 1955 Tour de France.

== Major results ==
1953
5th Züri-Metzgete
1954
5th Overall Tour of the Netherlands
1955
1st Overall Tour of the Netherlands

1st Stage 4a

1st Stage 1b (TTT) Tour de France
