= Alfred Kain =

Austrian cyclist

Personal information
- Born: 14 December 1927 Vienna, Austria
- Died: 7 February 2010 (aged 82) Vienna, Austria

Cycling career
- Sport: Cycling
- Role: Rider

Alfred Kain (14 December 1927 – 7 February 2010) was an Austrian racing cyclist. He rode in the 1954 Tour de France.
