= Georges Gilles =

French cyclist

Personal information
- Born: 16 December 1923
- Died: 14 December 2010 (aged 86)

Cycling career
- Sport: Cycling
- Role: Rider

Georges Gilles (16 December 1923 – 14 December 2010) was a French racing cyclist. He rode in the 1954 Tour de France.
