= Marcel Guitard =

French cyclist

Personal information
- Born: 27 August 1929
- Died: 7 December 1994 (aged 65)

Cycling career
- Sport: Cycling
- Role: Rider

Marcel Guitard (27 August 1929 – 7 December 1994) was a French professional racing cyclist. He rode in two editions of the Tour de France.
