= Marcel Dierkens =

Luxembourgish cyclist

Personal information
- Full name: Marcel Dierkens
- Born: 3 September 1925 Arsdorf, Luxembourg
- Died: 19 September 2008 (aged 83) Ostend, Belgium

Cycling career
- Sport: Cycling
- Role: Rider

Marcel Dierkens (3 September 1925 – 19 September 2008) was a Luxembourgish racing cyclist. He finished in last place in the 1954 Tour de France.
