= René De Smet =

Belgian cyclist

Personal information
- Born: 17 January 1931
- Died: 15 September 1985 (aged 54)

Cycling career
- Sport: Cycling
- Role: Rider

René De Smet (17 January 1931 – 15 September 1985) was a Belgian racing cyclist. He rode in the 1953 Tour de France.
