= Dominique Forlini =

French cyclist

Personal information
- Full name: Dominique Forlini
- Born: 14 September 1924 Paris, France
- Died: October 2014

Cycling career
- Sport: Cycling
- Discipline: Track/Road
- Role: Rider

Major wins
- 2 stages Tour de France

Dominique Forlini (Paris, 14 September 1924 - October 2014) was a French professional road bicycle racer. Forlini won many six-day racing events, and also some road victories, most importantly two stages in the 1954 Tour de France.

== Major results ==
1950
Paris - Valenciennes
1954
Six days of Berlin (with Emile Carrera)
Six days of Brussels (with Georges Senfftleben)
Tour de France:

Winner stages 6 and 15

1955
European championship track madison (with Georges Senfftleben)
Six days of Frankfurt (with Georges Senfftleben)
1956
Six days of Copenhagen (with Georges Senfftleben)
1959
Daumesnil
