= Francisco Alomar =

Spanish cyclist (1928–1955)

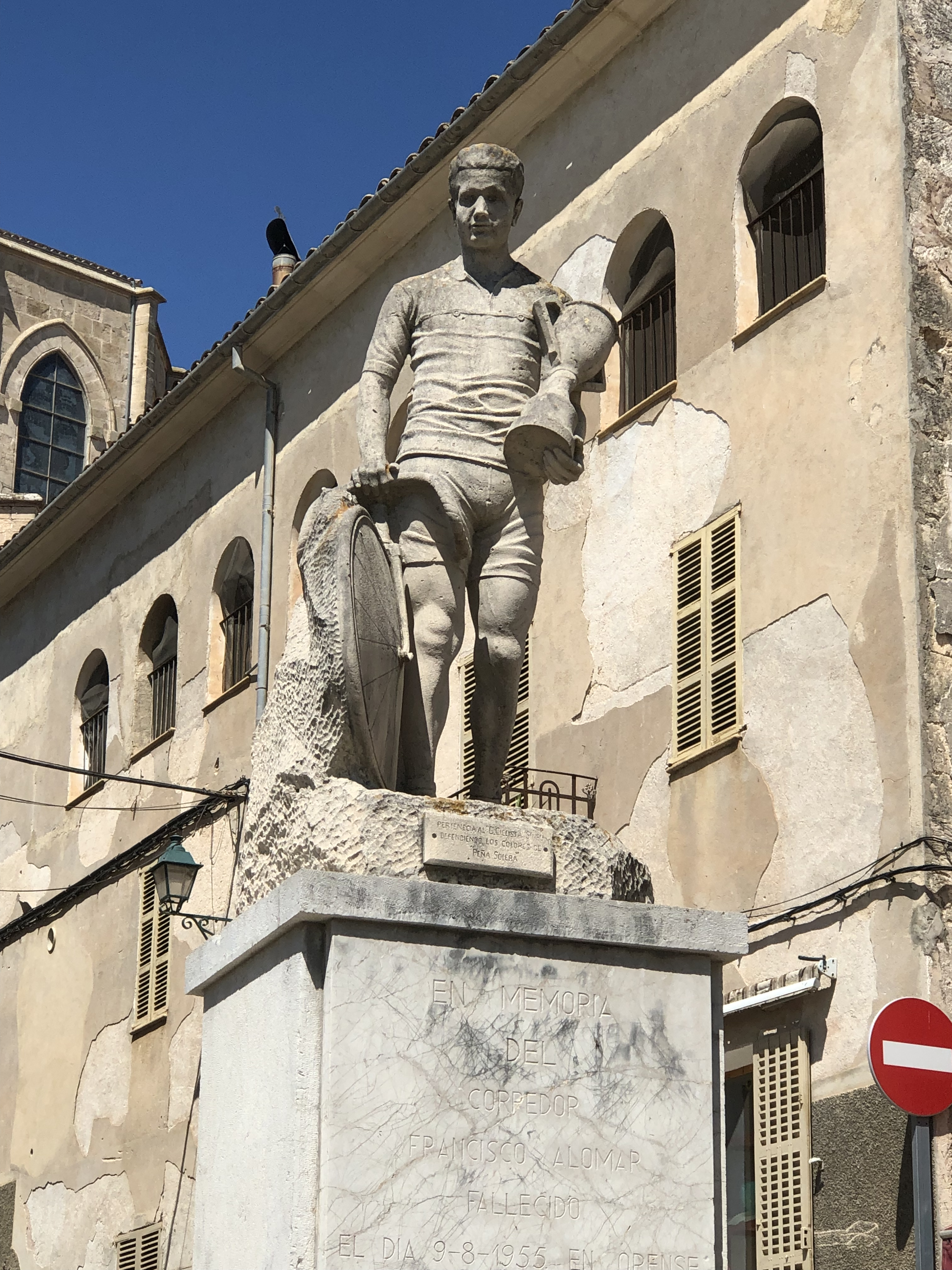

Personal information
- Born: 23 December 1928 Sineu, Mallorca, Spain
- Died: 9 August 1955 (aged 26)

Cycling career
- Sport: Cycling
- Role: Rider

Francisco Alomar (23 December 1928 – 9 August 1955) was a Spanish racing cyclist. He rode in the 1954 Tour de France.
