= Émile Guérinel =

French cyclist

Personal information
- Born: 3 June 1929
- Died: 2 February 2014 (aged 86)

Cycling career
- Sport: Cycling
- Role: Rider

Émile Guérinel (3 June 1929 – 2 February 2014) was a French racing cyclist. He rode in the 1953 Tour de France.
