= Emilio Croci-Torti =

Swiss cyclist (1922–2013)

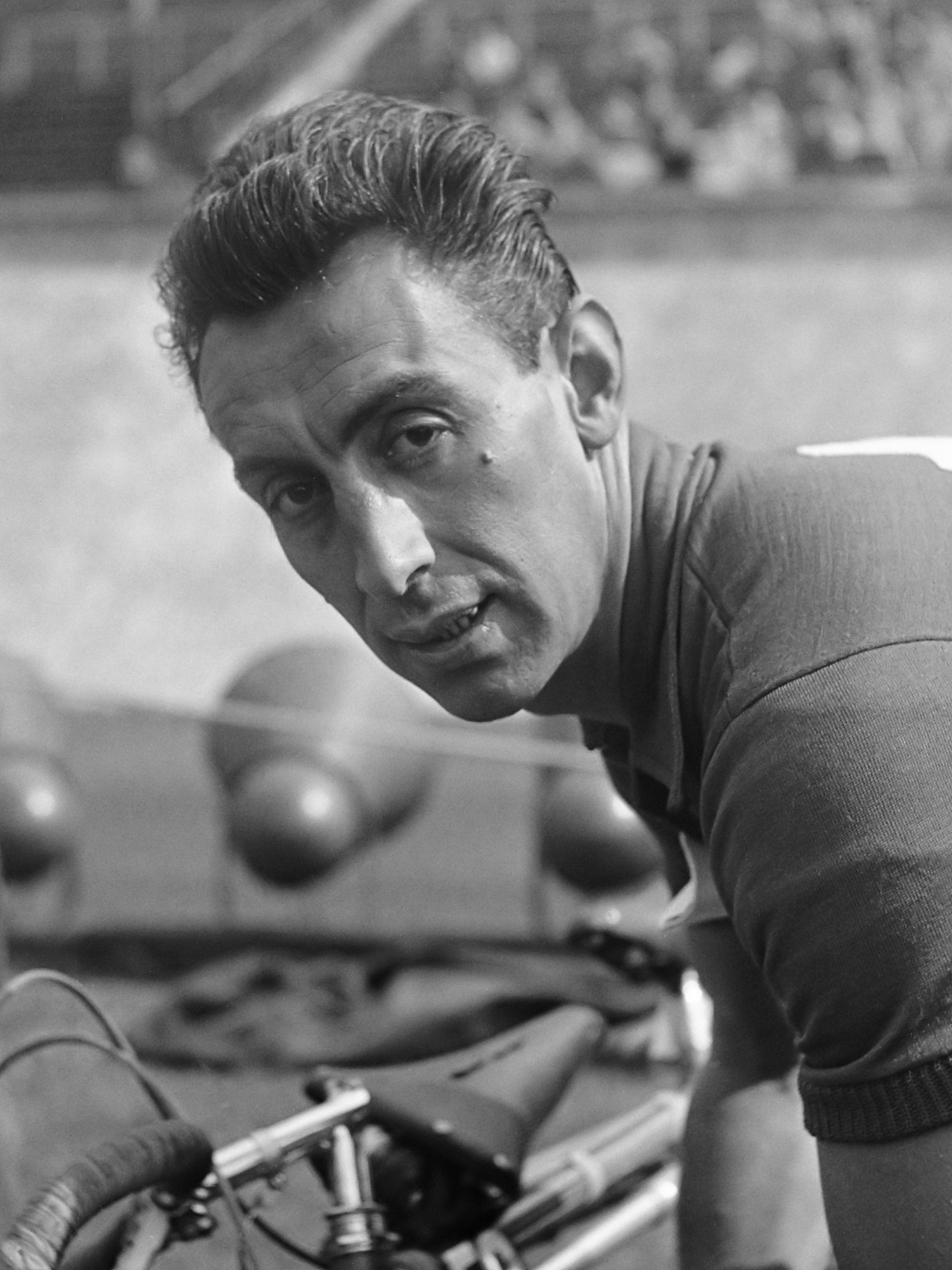

Personal information
- Born: 6 April 1922 Stabio, Switzerland
- Died: 2 July 2013 (aged 91) Stabio, Switzerland

Cycling career
- Sport: Cycling
- Discipline: Road
- Role: Rider

Emilio Croci-Torti (6 April 1922 – 2 July 2013) was a Swiss racing cyclist. Professional from 1946 to 1956, He rode in three editions of the Tour de France, seven of the Giro d'Italia and one Vuelta a España.

== Major results ==
1946
2nd Zurich–Lausanne
3rd Overall Tour des Trois Lacs
8th Milan–San Remo
1947
1st Tour du Lac Léman
7th Züri-Metzgete
1948
3rd Road race, National Road Championships
7th Overall Tour de Romandie
1949
2nd Road race, National Road Championships
3rd Trofeo Baracchi
3rd Tour des Quatre-Cantons
7th Giro del Ticino
1950
3rd Tour du Nord-Ouest
5th Giro della Provincia di reggio Calabria
9th Milan–San Remo
1952
1st Stage 8 Tour de Suisse
1954
1st Stage 2b Tour de Luxembourg
7th Giro del Ticino
