= 1954 Tour de France =

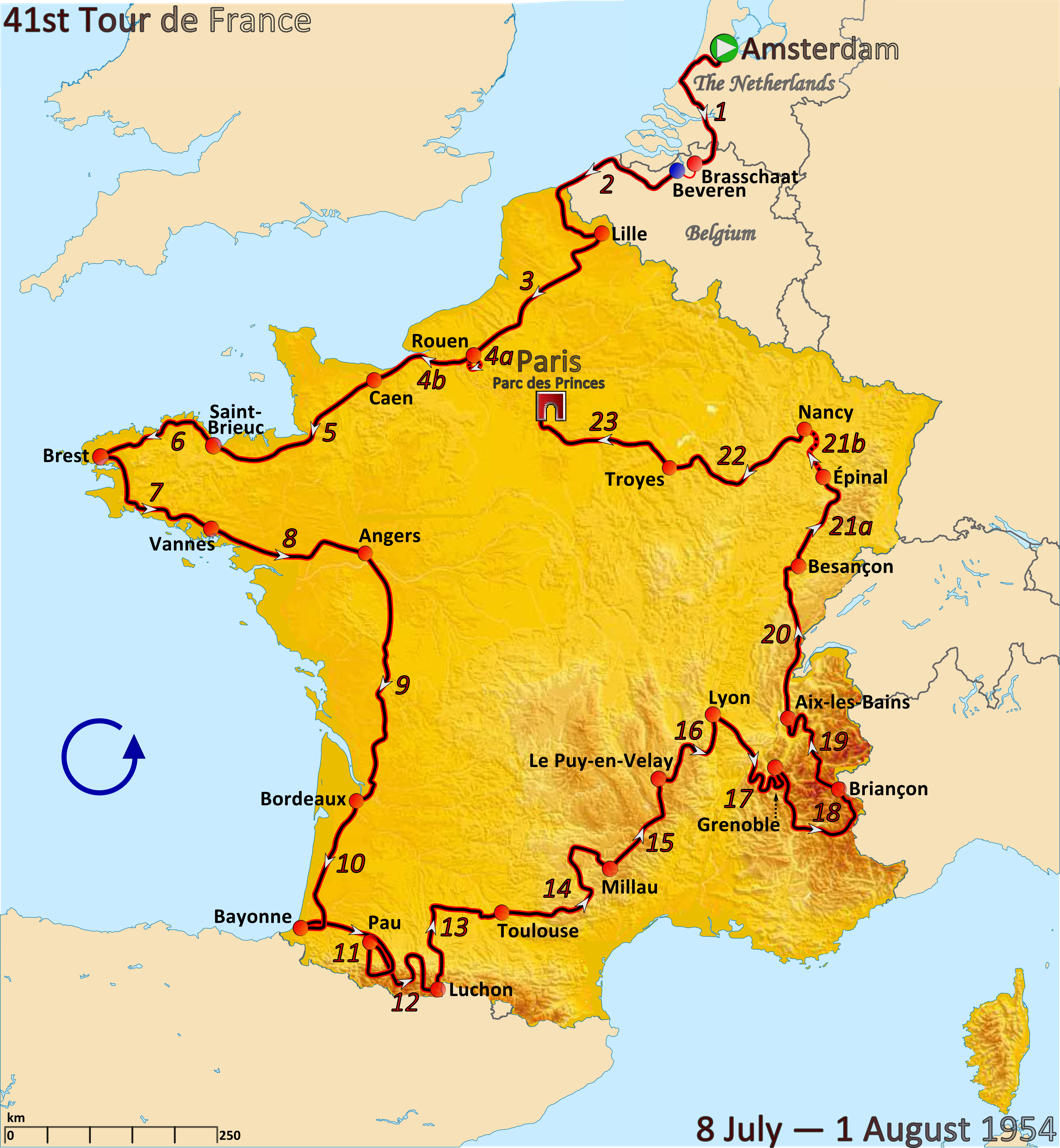
- Route of the 1954 Tour de France followed counterclockwise, starting in Amsterdam and finishing in Paris

Race details
- Dates: 8 July – 1 August 1954
- Stages: 23
- Distance: 4,656 km (2,893 mi)
- Winning time: 140h 06' 05"

Results
Jersey awarded to the overall winner	Winner	Louison Bobet (FRA)	(France)
	Second	Ferdinand Kübler (SUI)	(Switzerland)
	Third	Fritz Schär (SUI)	(Switzerland)
Jersey awarded to the points classification winner	Points	Ferdinand Kübler (SUI)	(Switzerland)
	Mountains	Federico Bahamontes (ESP)	(Spain)
	Combativity	Lucien Lazaridès (FRA); François Mahé (FRA)	
	Team	Switzerland	

The 1954 Tour de France was the 41st edition of the Tour de France, taking place from 8 July to 1 August 1954. It consisted of 23 stages over 4,656 km (2,893 mi). The race was won by Louison Bobet, the second of his three consecutive wins.

== Teams ==
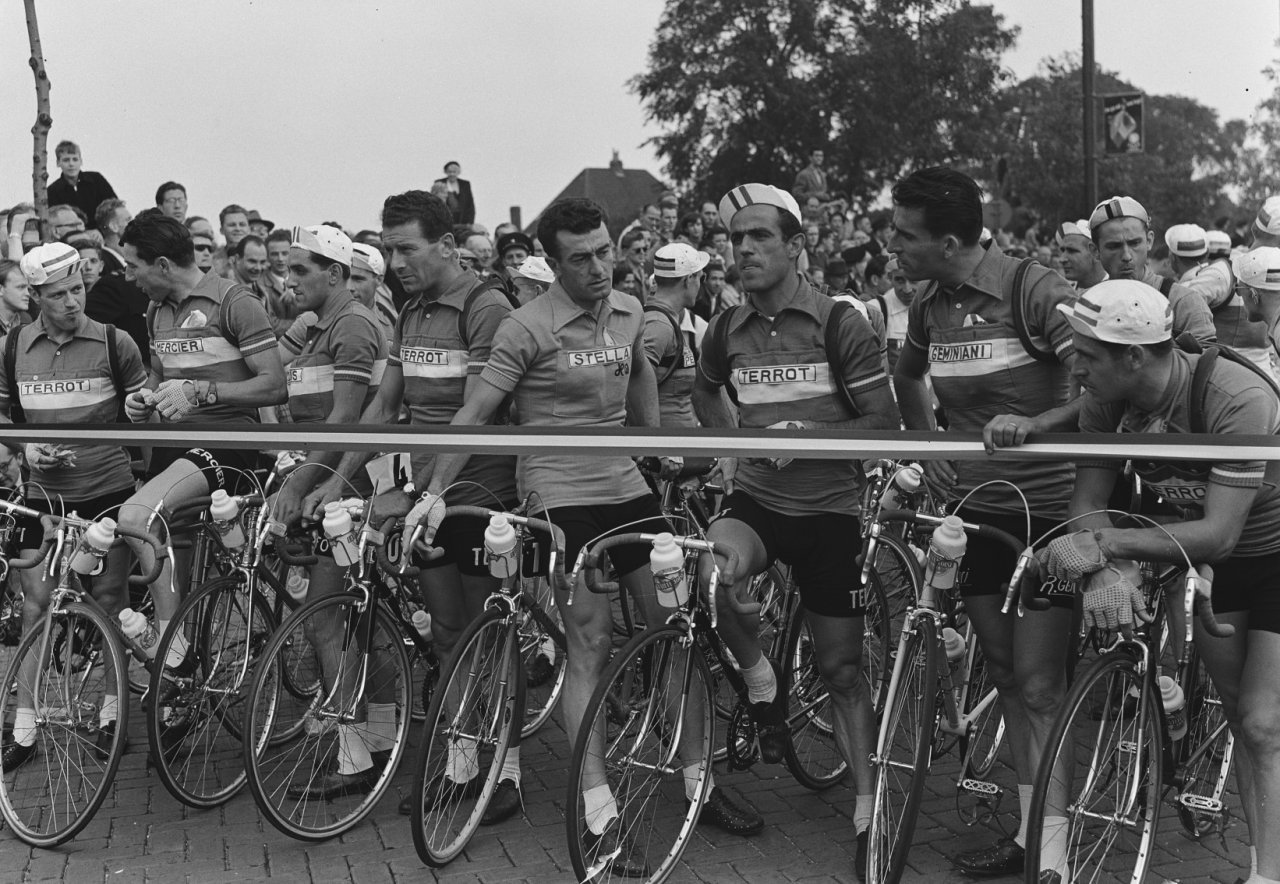
The French team at the start of stage one

As was the custom since the 1930 Tour de France, the 1954 Tour de France was contested by national and regional teams. Seven national teams were sent, with 10 cyclists each from France, the Netherlands, Belgium, Spain, Switzerland and Luxembourg/Austria (the latter a combined team). France additionally sent five regional teams from 10 cyclists each, divided into North-East/Centre, West, South-East, Île-de-France and South-West. The combined team Luxembourg/Austria consisted of six Luxembourger cyclists, three Austrian cyclists and one from Liechtenstein. In total, 110 cyclists started the race.

Notable absents were the Italian cyclists. In Italy, new "extra-sportives" sponsors had entered the market, non-cycling combinations promoted by Fiorenzo Magni with his "Nivea-Fuchs". The novelty provoked a protest from French cyclists, who therefore did not take part in the Giro. In response to the rudeness, the Italian Cycling Federation decided not to send a team to the Tour. In May, the Italian Federation head Adriano Rodoni announced Italian riders would not participate in the Tour.

The teams entering the race were:

- France
- Netherlands
- Belgium
- Spain
- Switzerland
- Luxembourg/Austria
- North-East/Centre
- West
- South-East
- Île-de-France
- South-West

== Route and stages ==
The 1954 Tour de France was the first time that the Tour had started outside France, as it started in Amsterdam. Also new was the team time trial. Although around 1930 the Tour had seen stages in which the teams started separately, in 1954 the team time trial format was reintroduced in a way that only the team time counted. Also the split stages were reintroduced. Stage 4 was divided into two parts: the team time trial of 10.4 km (part A), and a regular stage of 131 km (part B), both run on the same day. Similarly, stage 21 was divided into a regular stage of 134 km (part A) and an individual time trial of 72 km (part B), also both run on the same day. There were two rest days, in Bordeaux and Lyon. The highest point of elevation in the race was 2,556 m (8,386 ft) at the summit tunnel of the Col du Galibier mountain pass on stage 19.

Stage characteristics and winners
Stage	Date	Course	Distance	Type	Winner
1	8 July	Amsterdam (Netherlands) to Brasschaat (Belgium)	216 km (134 mi)	Plain stage	Wout Wagtmans (NED)
2	9 July	Beveren (Belgium) to Lille	255 km (158 mi)	Plain stage	Louison Bobet (FRA)
3	10 July	Lille to Rouen	219 km (136 mi)	Plain stage	Marcel Dussault (FRA)
4a	11 July	Rouen to Circuit des Essarts	10.4 km (6 mi)	Team time trial	Switzerland
4b	11 July	Rouen to Caen	131 km (81 mi)	Plain stage	Wim van Est (NED)
5	12 July	Caen to Saint-Brieuc	224 km (139 mi)	Plain stage	Ferdinand Kübler (SUI)
6	13 July	Saint-Brieuc to Brest	179 km (111 mi)	Plain stage	Dominique Forlini (FRA)
7	14 July	Brest to Vannes	211 km (131 mi)	Plain stage	Jacques Vivier (FRA)
8	15 July	Vannes to Angers	190 km (118 mi)	Plain stage	Fred De Bruyne (BEL)
9	16 July	Angers to Bordeaux	343 km (213 mi)	Plain stage	Henk Faanhof (NED)
	17 July	Bordeaux		Rest day	
10	18 July	Bordeaux to Bayonne	202 km (126 mi)	Plain stage	Gilbert Bauvin (FRA)
11	19 July	Bayonne to Pau	241 km (150 mi)	Stage with mountain(s)	Stan Ockers (BEL)
12	20 July	Pau to Luchon	161 km (100 mi)	Stage with mountain(s)	Gilbert Bauvin (FRA)
13	21 July	Luchon to Toulouse	203 km (126 mi)	Plain stage	Fred De Bruyne (BEL)
14	22 July	Toulouse to Millau	225 km (140 mi)	Stage with mountain(s)	Ferdinand Kübler (SUI)
15	23 July	Millau to Le Puy	197 km (122 mi)	Stage with mountain(s)	Dominique Forlini (FRA)
16	24 July	Le Puy to Lyon	194 km (121 mi)	Stage with mountain(s)	Jean Forestier (FRA)
	25 July	Lyon		Rest day	
17	26 July	Lyon to Grenoble	182 km (113 mi)	Stage with mountain(s)	Lucien Lazaridès (FRA)
18	27 July	Grenoble to Briançon	216 km (134 mi)	Stage with mountain(s)	Louison Bobet (FRA)
19	28 July	Briançon to Aix-les-Bains	221 km (137 mi)	Stage with mountain(s)	Jean Dotto (FRA)
20	29 July	Aix les Bains to Besançon	243 km (151 mi)	Stage with mountain(s)	Lucien Teisseire (FRA)
21a	30 July	Besançon to Épinal	134 km (83 mi)	Plain stage	François Mahé (FRA)
21b	30 July	Epinal to Nancy	72 km (45 mi)	Individual time trial	Louison Bobet (FRA)
22	31 July	Nancy to Troyes	216 km (134 mi)	Plain stage	Fred De Bruyne (BEL)
23	1 August	Troyes to Paris	180 km (112 mi)	Plain stage	Robert Varnajo (FRA)
	Total		4,656 km (2,893 mi)		

== Race overview ==
Dutch news reel about the 1954 Tour de France

In the first stage, Wout Wagtmans won the sprint, and took the yellow jersey. He would remain the leader until the team time trial in stage 4, when the French team won back enough time on the Dutch team for Bobet to take over the lead. In that time trial, over 10.4 km, the winning team was decided by adding the times of the three best cyclists per team. For the general classification, every cyclist got added his individual time. In the second part of the fourth stage, former winner Jean Robic hit a photographer during the sprint, fell down and had to give up.

In the eighth stage, Wagtmans had joined a breakaway, which won enough time on Bobet for Wagtmans to take back the yellow jersey. Wagtmans fell down in the eleventh stage, and although he managed to keep his lead until the start of the twelfth stage, he continued without morale. In the twelfth stage in the Pyrenees, three important riders attacked: Bauvin, Bahamontes and Malléjac. They stayed ahead, and Bauvin jumped to the first position in the general classification. Bobet was not far behind these three, and moved into the second place. In that twelfth stage, Hugo Koblet had fallen down, and lost 27 minutes, and his chances to win the Tour de France a second time. In the next stage, Koblet gave up.

In the fourteenth stage, the Swiss cyclists were fighting back. They were riding as fast as they could, and the leading group was getting smaller. Bauvin also could not keep up with that group, partly because he had a flat tire, and finished 8 minutes behind, losing the leading position. Bobet however could keep up with the Swiss pace, and took over the yellow jersey as leader of the general classification.

In the sixteenth stage, Bauvin lost another 20 minutes, and dropped to sixth place. The Swiss cyclists had attacked Bobet where they could, but were unable to gain time on him. They had moved into second and third place of the general classification. In the eighteenth stage, Bobet dominated, and dropped all of the other contenders. He won by a margin of one minute and 49 seconds, and his margin in the general classification was 12 minutes 49 seconds, which would normally be large enough for the victory. Bobet also won the individual time trial, and thereby increased his margin even more.

The Swiss cyclists could not attack Bobet anymore in the last stages, so Bobet won his second Tour de France. The Swiss team had performed well though, capturing the second and third place in the general classification, winning the team classification and having Kübler win the points classification.

== Classification leadership and minor prizes ==
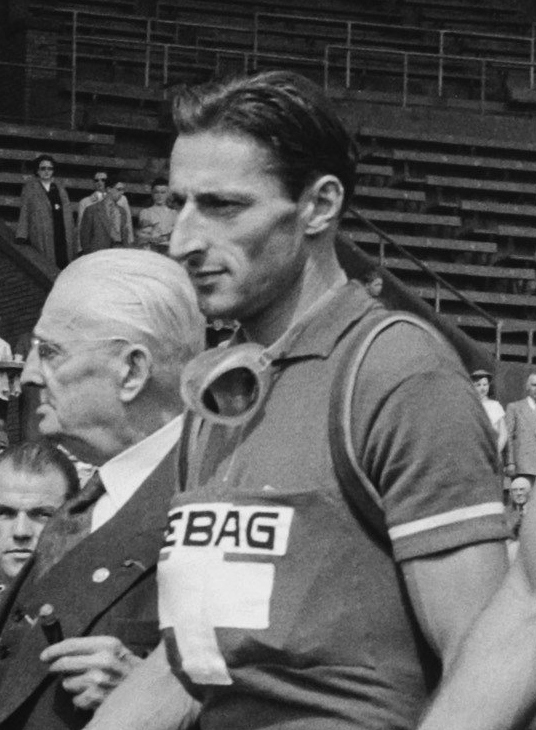
Ferdinand Kübler won the points classification in the 1954 Tour de France.

The time that each cyclist required to finish each stage was recorded, and these times were added together for the general classification. If a cyclist had received a time bonus, it was subtracted from this total; all time penalties were added to this total. The cyclist with the least accumulated time was the race leader, identified by the yellow jersey. Of the 110 cyclists that started the 1954 Tour de France, 69 finished the race.

The points classification was calculated in the same way as in 1953, following the calculation method from the Tours de France from 1905 to 1912. Points were given according to the ranking of the stage: the winner received one point, the next cyclist two points, and so on. These points were added, and the cyclist with the fewest points was the leader of the points classification. In 1954, this was won by Ferdinand Kübler.

Points for the mountains classification were earned by reaching the mountain tops first. The system was almost the same as in 1953: there were two types of mountain tops: the hardest ones, in category 1, gave 10 points to the first cyclist, the easier ones, in category 2, gave 6 points to the first cyclist, and the easiest ones, in category 3, gave 3 points. Federico Bahamontes won this classification.

The team classification was calculated as the sum of the daily team classifications, and the daily team classification was calculated by adding the times in the stage result of the best three cyclists per team. It was won by the Swiss team.

In addition, there was a combativity award given after each stage to the cyclist considered most combative. The split stages each had a combined winner. The decision was made by a jury composed of journalists who gave points. The cyclist with the most points from votes in all stages led the combativity classification. At the end of the Tour de France, Lucien Lazaridès and François Mahé were leading this classification with equal points and shared the overall super-combativity award. The Souvenir Henri Desgrange was given to the first rider to pass the memorial to Tour founder Henri Desgrange near the summit of the Col du Galibier on stage 19. This prize was won by Federico Bahamontes.

Classification leadership by stage
Stage	Winner	General classification	Points classification	Mountains classification (Note: No jersey was awarded to the leader of the mountains classification until a white jersey with red polka dots was introduced in 1975.)	Team classification	Combativity		Bad luck award
Stage	Winner	General classification	Points classification	Mountains classification	Team classification	Award	Classification	Bad luck award
1	Wout Wagtmans	Wout Wagtmans	Wout Wagtmans	no award	Netherlands	Hugo Koblet	Hugo Koblet	Ferdi Kübler
2	Louison Bobet	Wout Wagtmans	Gilbert Bauvin	no award	France	Lucien Lazaridès	Lucien Lazaridès	Charly Gaul
3	Marcel Dussault	Wout Wagtmans	Gilbert Bauvin	no award	France	Richard Van Genechten	Lucien Lazaridès	Hein van Breenen
4a	Switzerland	Louison Bobet	Gilbert Bauvin	no award	France	Charly Gaul	Lucien Lazaridès	
4b	Wim van Est	Louison Bobet	Gilbert Bauvin	no award	France	Charly Gaul	Lucien Lazaridès	
5	Ferdinand Kübler	Louison Bobet	Gilbert Bauvin	no award	France	Vincent Vitetta	Lucien Lazaridès	Rolf Graf
6	Dominique Forlini	Louison Bobet	Ferdinand Kübler	no award	Switzerland	René De Smet	Lucien Lazaridès	Albert Bouvet
7	Jacques Vivier	Louison Bobet	Ferdinand Kübler	no award	Switzerland	Émile Guérinel	Lucien Lazaridès	Gilbert Bauvin
8	Fred De Bruyne	Wout Wagtmans	Ferdinand Kübler	no award	Switzerland	Jean Le Guilly	Lucien Lazaridès	Alfons Van den Brande
9	Henk Faanhof	Wout Wagtmans	Ferdinand Kübler	no award	Switzerland	François Mahé	Lucien Lazaridès	Vincent Vitetta
10	Gilbert Bauvin	Wout Wagtmans	Ferdinand Kübler	no award	Switzerland	Jean Stablinski	Jean Stablinski	Hugo Koblet
11	Stan Ockers	Wout Wagtmans	Ferdinand Kübler	Federico Bahamontes	Switzerland	Valentin Huot	Jean Stablinski	Nicolas Morn
12	Gilbert Bauvin	Gilbert Bauvin	Ferdinand Kübler	Federico Bahamontes	Switzerland	Federico Bahamontes	François Mahé	Richard Van Genechten
13	Fred De Bruyne	Gilbert Bauvin	Ferdinand Kübler	Federico Bahamontes	Switzerland	René Privat	François Mahé	Valentin Huot
14	Ferdinand Kübler	Louison Bobet	Ferdinand Kübler	Federico Bahamontes	Switzerland	Lucien Lazaridès	Lucien Lazaridès	Gilbert Bauvin
15	Dominique Forlini	Louison Bobet	Ferdinand Kübler	Federico Bahamontes	Switzerland	Gerrit Voorting	Lucien Lazaridès	Emile Guérinel
16	Jean Forestier	Louison Bobet	Ferdinand Kübler	Federico Bahamontes	Switzerland	Robert Varnajo	Lucien Lazaridès	Lucien Lazaridès
17	Lucien Lazaridès	Louison Bobet	Ferdinand Kübler	Federico Bahamontes	Switzerland	Jean Le Guilly	Lucien Lazaridès	Jean Le Guilly
18	Louison Bobet	Louison Bobet	Ferdinand Kübler	Federico Bahamontes	Switzerland	Louison Bobet	Lucien Lazaridès	Wim van Est
19	Jean Dotto	Louison Bobet	Ferdinand Kübler	Federico Bahamontes	Switzerland	Jean Dotto	Lucien Lazaridès	Antonin Rolland
20	Lucien Teisseire	Louison Bobet	Ferdinand Kübler	Federico Bahamontes	Switzerland	François Mahé	Lucien Lazaridès	Robert Varnajo
21a	François Mahé	Louison Bobet	Ferdinand Kübler	Federico Bahamontes	Switzerland	Louison Bobet	Lucien Lazaridès	Jean Stablinski
21b	Louison Bobet	Louison Bobet	Ferdinand Kübler	Federico Bahamontes	Switzerland	Louison Bobet	Lucien Lazaridès	Jean Stablinski
22	Fred De Bruyne	Louison Bobet	Ferdinand Kübler	Federico Bahamontes	Switzerland	Fred De Bruyne	Lucien Lazaridès	Jos Suijkerbuijk
23	Robert Varnajo	Louison Bobet	Ferdinand Kübler	Federico Bahamontes	Switzerland	Fred De Bruyne	Lucien Lazaridès	Federico Bahamontes
Final		Louison Bobet	Ferdinand Kübler	Federico Bahamontes	Switzerland	Lucien Lazaridès and François Mahé		

== Final standings ==
=== General classification ===
Final general classification (1–10)
Rank	Rider	Team	Time
1	Louison Bobet (FRA)	France	140h 06' 05"
2	Ferdinand Kübler (SUI)	Switzerland	+ 15' 49"
3	Fritz Schär (SUI)	Switzerland	+ 21' 46"
4	Jean Dotto (FRA)	South-East	+ 28' 21"
5	Jean Malléjac (FRA)	West	+ 31' 38"
6	Stan Ockers (BEL)	Belgium	+ 36' 02"
7	Louis Bergaud (FRA)	South-West	+ 37' 55"
8	Vincent Vitetta (FRA)	South-East	+ 41' 14"
9	Jean Brankart (BEL)	Belgium	+ 42' 08"
10	Gilbert Bauvin (FRA)	North-East/Centre	+ 42' 21"

Final general classification (11–69)
Rank	Rider	Team	Time
11	Nello Lauredi (FRA)	France	+ 42' 42"
12	Carlo Clerici (SUI)	Switzerland	+ 56' 36"
13	Apo Lazaridès (FRA)	South-East	+ 1h 04' 03"
14	Jan Nolten (NED)	Netherlands	+ 1h 04' 15"
15	François Mahé (FRA)	West	+ 1h 09' 03"
16	Wim van Est (NED)	Netherlands	+ 1h 09' 13"
17	Gerrit Voorting (NED)	Netherlands	+ 1h 10' 20"
18	Bernardo Ruiz (ESP)	Spain	+ 1h 11' 28"
19	Antonin Rolland (FRA)	France	+ 1h 12' 20"
20	Hein van Breenen (NED)	Netherlands	+ 1h 19' 10"
21	Marcel De Mulder (BEL)	Belgium	+ 1h 21' 08"
22	Richard Van Genechten (BEL)	Belgium	+ 1h 24' 58"
23	Lucien Teisseire (FRA)	France	+ 1h 28' 52"
24	Lucien Lazaridès (FRA)	South-East	+ 1h 31' 53"
25	Federico Bahamontes (ESP)	Spain	+ 1h 37' 42"
26	Adolphe Deledda (FRA)	France	+ 1h 39' 46"
27	Jean Forestier (FRA)	France	+ 1h 43' 48"
28	Maurice Quentin (FRA)	Île-de-France	+ 1h 45' 24"
29	Alex Close (BEL)	Belgium	+ 1h 56' 00"
30	Willy Kemp (LUX)	Luxembourg/Austria	+ 2h 03' 21"
31	Francesco Alomar (ESP)	Spain	+ 2h 15' 02"
32	Dominique Forlini (FRA)	Île-de-France	+ 2h 18' 36"
33	Jean Le Guilly (FRA)	Île-de-France	+ 2h 19' 48"
34	René De Smet (BEL)	Belgium	+ 2h 28' 39"
35	Raymond Hoorelbeke (FRA)	Île-de-France	+ 2h 29' 44"
36	Alfred De Bruyne (BEL)	Belgium	+ 2h 32' 01"
37	Andrés Trobat (ESP)	Spain	+ 2h 45' 10"
38	Raoul Rémy (FRA)	France	+ 2h 47' 04"
39	Georges Meunier (FRA)	North-East/Centre	+ 2h 49' 53"
40	Jacques Vivier (FRA)	South-West	+ 2h 50' 21"
41	Robert Varnajo (FRA)	West	+ 2h 55' 51"
42	Joseph Mirando (FRA)	South-East	+ 2h 56' 18"
43	Emilio Rodríguez (ESP)	Spain	+ 2h 57' 18"
44	José Pérez (ESP)	Spain	+ 2h 59' 45"
45	Manuel Rodríguez (ESP)	Spain	+ 3h 03' 25"
46	Jean-Marie Cieleska (FRA)	North-East/Centre	+ 3h 06' 27"
47	Henk Faanhof (NED)	Netherlands	+ 3h 09' 48"
48	Jean-Louis Carle (FRA)	Île-de-France	+ 3h 17' 18"
49	André Darrigade (FRA)	France	+ 3h 17' 56"
50	Remo Pianezzi (SUI)	Switzerland	+ 3h 19' 56"
51	Stanislas Bober (FRA)	Île-de-France	+ 3h 21' 02"
52	René Privat (FRA)	South-West	+ 3h 22' 31"
53	Marcel Guitard (FRA)	South-West	+ 3h 23' 58"
54	Salvador Botella (ESP)	Spain	+ 3h 27' 00"
55	Francesco Masip (ESP)	Spain	+ 3h 28' 59"
56	Emilio Croci-Torti (SUI)	Switzerland	+ 3h 33' 20"
57	Eugène Telotte (FRA)	North-East/Centre	+ 3h 37' 41"
58	Alfred Tonello (FRA)	Île-de-France	+ 3h 38' 18"
59	Pierre Molinéris (FRA)	France	+ 4h 09' 27"
60	Georges Gilles (FRA)	West	+ 4h 15' 05"
61	Francis Siguenza (FRA)	South-East	+ 4h 15' 09"
62	Marcel Dussault (FRA)	South-West	+ 4h 17' 45"
63	Albert Bouvet (FRA)	West	+ 4h 20' 06"
64	Marcel Hendrickx (BEL)	Belgium	+ 4h 36' 29"
65	Émile Guérinel (FRA)	West	+ 4h 40' 50"
66	Jean Bellay (FRA)	North-East/Centre	+ 4h 44' 56"
67	Philippe Agut (FRA)	South-West	+ 4h 47' 21"
68	Kurt Schneider (AUT)	Luxembourg/Austria	+ 5h 50' 12"
69	Marcel Dierkens (LUX)	Luxembourg/Austria	+ 6h 07' 29"

=== Points classification ===
Final points classification (1–10)
Rank	Rider	Team	Points
1	Ferdinand Kübler (SUI)	Switzerland	215.5
2	Stan Ockers (BEL)	Belgium	284.5
3	Fritz Schär (SUI)	Switzerland	286.5
4	Wim van Est (NED)	Netherlands	502.5
5	Louison Bobet (FRA)	France	513
6	Gilbert Bauvin (FRA)	North-East/Centre	615
7	Dominique Forlini (FRA)	Île-de-France	618
8	Vincent Vitetta (FRA)	South-East	653
9	Richard Van Genechten (BEL)	Belgium	660
10	Jean Malléjac (FRA)	West	675

=== Mountains classification ===
Final mountains classification (1–10)
Rank	Rider	Team	Points
1	Federico Bahamontes (ESP)	Spain	95
2	Louison Bobet (FRA)	France	53
3	Richard Van Genechten (BEL)	Belgium	45
4	Jean Le Guilly (FRA)	Île-de-France	38
5	Jean Dotto (FRA)	South-East	33
6	Ferdinand Kübler (SUI)	Switzerland	31
7	Jean Malléjac (FRA)	West	23
8	Stan Ockers (BEL)	Belgium	20
8	Robert Varnajo (FRA)	West	20
10	Bernardo Ruiz (ESP)	Spain	16

=== Team classification ===
Final team classification
Rank	Team	Time
1	Switzerland	420h 29' 57"
2	France	+ 18' 27"
3	Belgium	+ 32' 19"
4	Netherlands	+ 1h 09' 00"
5	South-East	+ 1h 13' 37"
6	Spain	+ 2h 26' 08"
7	West	+ 2h 42' 58"
8	North-East/Centre	+ 3h 50' 16"
9	South-West	+ 4h 08' 31"
10	Île-de-France	+ 4h 27' 52"
11	Luxembourg/Austria	+ 10h 20' 27"

=== Combativity classification ===
Final combativity classification (1–10)
Rank	Rider	Team	Points
1	Lucien Lazaridès (FRA)	South-East	20
1	François Mahé (FRA)	West	20
3	Louison Bobet (FRA)	France	18
3	Fred De Bruyne (BEL)	Belgium	18
5	Robert Varnajo (FRA)	West	11
6	René Privat (FRA)	South-West	10
6	Jean Dotto (FRA)	South-East	10
6	Jean Le Guilly (FRA)	Île-de-France	10
6	Richard Van Genechten (BEL)	Belgium	10
6	Vincent Vitetta (FRA)	South-East	10

== Aftermath ==
After he won the Tour de France, Bobet would later win the 1954 UCI Road World Championships. The next year he would win the 1955 Tour de France, thereby becoming the first cyclist to win three Tours in a row.

== Bibliography ==
- Amels, Wim (1984). De geschiedenis van de Tour de France 1903–1984 (in Dutch). Valkenswaard, Netherlands: Sport-Express. ISBN 978-90-70763-05-3.
- Augendre, Jacques (2016). Guide historique [Historical guide] (PDF) (in French). Paris: Amaury Sport Organisation. Archived (PDF) from the original on 17 August 2016.
- McGann, Bill; McGann, Carol (2006). The Story of the Tour de France: 1903–1964. Vol. 1. Indianapolis, IN: Dog Ear Publishing. ISBN 978-1-59858-180-5.
- Nauright, John; Parrish, Charles (2012). Sports Around the World: History, Culture, and Practice. Vol. 2. Santa Barbara, CA: ABC-CLIO. ISBN 978-1-59884-300-2.
- Thompson, Christopher S. (2006). The Tour de France: A Cultural History. University of California Press. ISBN 0-520-24760-4.
- van den Akker, Pieter (2018). Tour de France Rules and Statistics: 1903–2018. Self-published. ISBN 978-1-79398-080-9.
