= Richard Van Genechten =

Belgian cyclist

Personal information
- Born: 23 July 1930 Brussels, Belgium
- Died: 13 November 2010 (aged 80) Laken, Belgium

Cycling career
- Sport: Cycling
- Role: Rider

Richard Van Genechten (23 July 1930 – 13 November 2010) was a Belgian professional racing cyclist. He rode in four editions of the Tour de France.
