= Hein van Breenen =

Dutch cyclist (1929–1990)

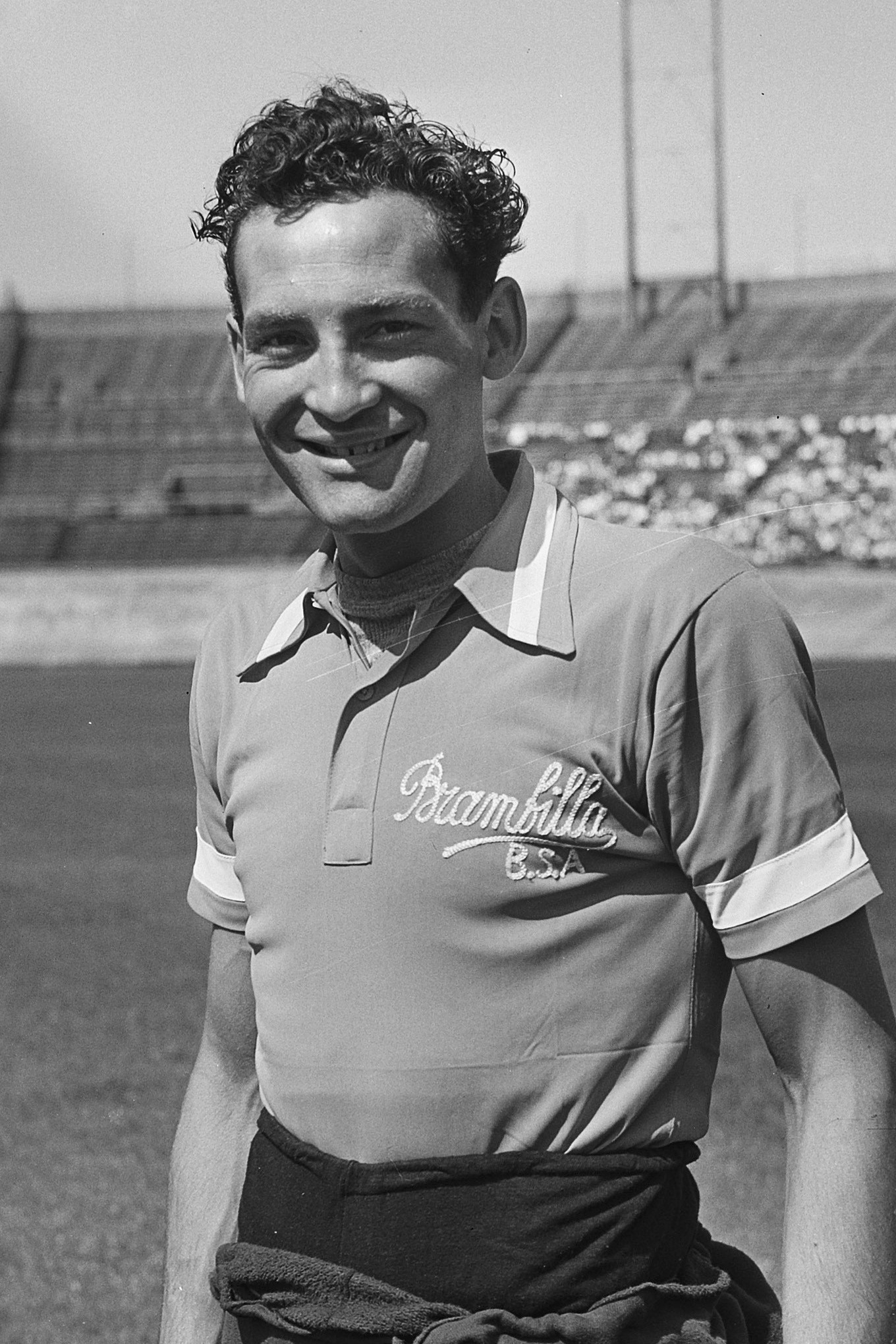
- Hein van Breenen in 1953

Personal information
- Born: 12 June 1929 Amsterdam, the Netherlands
- Died: 8 March 1990 (aged 60) Amsterdam, the Netherlands

Cycling career
- Sport: Cycling
- Discipline: Road
- Role: Rider

Hein van Breenen (12 June 1929 – 8 March 1990) was a Dutch racing cyclist. He rode the Tour de France in 1952–1955 with the best result of 20th place in 1954; that year he finished within the podium at three Tour de France stages. Next year he ended 11th overall at the Giro d'Italia.
