= 1955 Tour de France, Stage 12 to Stage 22 =

Cycling race stages

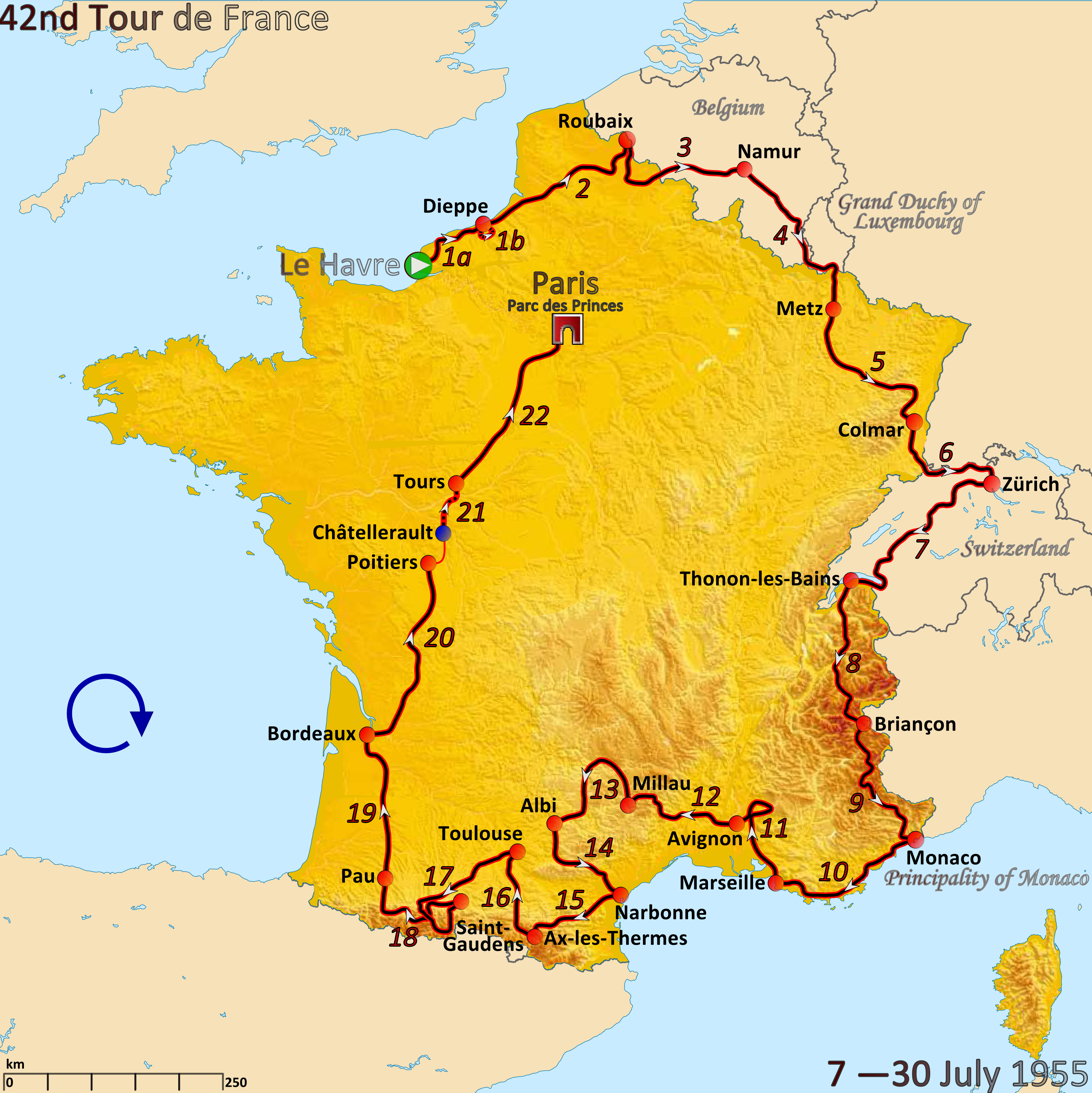
Route of the 1955 Tour de France

The 1955 Tour de France was the 42nd edition of Tour de France, one of cycling's Grand Tours. The Tour began in Le Havre with a flat stage on 7 July and Stage 12 occurred on 19 July with a mountainous stage from Avignon. The race finished in Paris on 30 July.

== Stage 12 ==
19 July 1955 - Avignon to Millau, 240 km (149.1 mi)

Stage 12 result

| Rank | Rider | Team | Time |
|---|---|---|---|
| 1 | Alessandro Fantini (ITA) | Italy | 6h 53' 50" |
| 2 | Stan Ockers (BEL) | Belgium | s.t. |
| 3 | Nello Lauredi (FRA) | France – South-East | s.t. |
| 4 | Wim van Est (NED) | Netherlands | s.t. |
| 5 | Bernard Gauthier (FRA) | France | s.t. |
| 6 | Alexandre Close (BEL) | Belgium | s.t. |
| 7 | Jean Bobet (FRA) | France | s.t. |
| 8 | François Mahé (FRA) | France | s.t. |
| 9 | Jean Forestier (FRA) | France | + 38" |
| 10 | Jean Stablinski (FRA) | France – North-East/Centre | + 2' 07" |

General classification after stage 12

| Rank | Rider | Team | Time |
|---|---|---|---|
| 1 | Antonin Rolland (FRA) | France | 76h 50' 56" |
| 2 | Louison Bobet (FRA) | France | + 4' 53" |
| 3 | Pasquale Fornara (ITA) | Italy | + 6' 18" |
| 4 | Jean Brankart (BEL) | Belgium | + 10' 44" |
| 5 | Giancarlo Astrua (ITA) | Italy | + 12' 44" |
| 6 | Wim van Est (NED) | Netherlands | + 12' 50" |
| 7 | Vincent Vitetta (FRA) | France – South-East | + 13' 56" |
| 8 | Charly Gaul (LUX) | Luxembourg/International | + 14' 00" |
| 9 | Alexandre Close (BEL) | Belgium | + 18' 41" |
| 10 | Raphaël Géminiani (FRA) | France | + 19' 19" |

== Stage 13 ==
20 July 1955 - Millau to Albi, 205 km (127 mi)

Stage 13 result

| Rank | Rider | Team | Time |
|---|---|---|---|
| 1 | Daan de Groot (NED) | Netherlands | 5h 52' 41" |
| 2 | André Darrigade (FRA) | France | + 20' 31" |
| 3 | Georges Gay (FRA) | France – South-West | s.t. |
| 4 | Kurt Schneider (AUT) | Luxembourg/International | s.t. |
| 5 | Louis Caput (FRA) | France – Île-de-France | + 20' 45" |
| 6 | Denilo Barozzi (ITA) | Italy | s.t. |
| 7 | Hein Van Breenen (NED) | Netherlands | s.t. |
| 8 | Miguel Poblet (ESP) | Spain | + 21' 09" |
| 9 | Stan Ockers (BEL) | Belgium | s.t. |
| 10 | Wim van Est (NED) | Netherlands | s.t. |

General classification after stage 13

| Rank | Rider | Team | Time |
|---|---|---|---|
| 1 | Antonin Rolland (FRA) | France | 83h 04' 46" |
| 2 | Louison Bobet (FRA) | France | + 4' 53" |
| 3 | Pasquale Fornara (ITA) | Italy | + 6' 18" |
| 4 | Jean Brankart (BEL) | Belgium | + 10' 44" |
| 5 | Giancarlo Astrua (ITA) | Italy | + 12' 44" |
| 6 | Wim van Est (NED) | Netherlands | + 12' 50" |
| 7 | Vincent Vitetta (FRA) | France – South-East | + 13' 56" |
| 8 | Charly Gaul (LUX) | Luxembourg/International | + 14' 00" |
| 9 | Alexandre Close (BEL) | Belgium | + 18' 41" |
| 10 | Raphaël Géminiani (FRA) | France | + 19' 19" |

== Stage 14 ==
21 July 1955 - Albi to Narbonne, 156 km (97 mi)

Stage 14 result

| Rank | Rider | Team | Time |
|---|---|---|---|
| 1 | Louis Caput (FRA) | France – Île-de-France | 4h 12' 05" |
| 2 | Fred De Bruyne (BEL) | Belgium | s.t. |
| 3 | Rino Benedetti (ITA) | Italy | s.t. |
| 4 | Bruno Monti (ITA) | Italy | s.t. |
| 5 | Jean Forestier (FRA) | France | s.t. |
| 6 | Max Cohen (FRA) | France – North-East/Centre | s.t. |
| 7 | Ugo Anzile (FRA) | France – North-East/Centre | s.t. |
| 8 | Maurice Quentin (FRA) | France – West | s.t. |
| 9 | Jan Nolten (NED) | Netherlands | s.t. |
| 10 | Raymond Impanis (BEL) | Belgium | s.t. |

General classification after stage 14

| Rank | Rider | Team | Time |
|---|---|---|---|
| 1 | Antonin Rolland (FRA) | France | 87h 23' 50" |
| 2 | Louison Bobet (FRA) | France | + 4' 53" |
| 3 | Pasquale Fornara (ITA) | Italy | + 6' 18" |
| 4 | Jean Brankart (BEL) | Belgium | + 10' 44" |
| 5 | Raphaël Géminiani (FRA) | France | + 12' 20" |
| 6 | Giancarlo Astrua (ITA) | Italy | + 12' 44" |
| 7 | Wim van Est (NED) | Netherlands | + 12' 50" |
| 8 | Vincent Vitetta (FRA) | France – South-East | + 13' 56" |
| 9 | Charly Gaul (LUX) | Luxembourg/International | + 14' 00" |
| 10 | Alexandre Close (BEL) | Belgium | + 18' 41" |

== Stage 15 ==
22 July 1955 - Narbonne to Ax-les-Thermes, 151 km (94 mi)

Stage 15 result

| Rank | Rider | Team | Time |
|---|---|---|---|
| 1 | Luciano Pezzi (ITA) | Italy | 4h 32' 53" |
| 2 | Jan Nolten (NED) | Netherlands | s.t. |
| 3 | Miguel Poblet (ESP) | Spain | + 5' 50" |
| 4 | Giancarlo Astrua (ITA) | Italy | s.t. |
| 5 | Stan Ockers (BEL) | Belgium | s.t. |
| 6 | Alessandro Fantini (ITA) | Italy | s.t. |
| 7 | Pietro Giudici (ITA) | Italy | s.t. |
| 8 | Wim van Est (NED) | Netherlands | s.t. |
| 9 | Louison Bobet (FRA) | France | s.t. |
| 10 | Fred De Bruyne (BEL) | Belgium | s.t. |

General classification after stage 15

| Rank | Rider | Team | Time |
|---|---|---|---|
| 1 | Antonin Rolland (FRA) | France | 92h 02' 33" |
| 2 | Louison Bobet (FRA) | France | + 4' 53" |
| 3 | Pasquale Fornara (ITA) | Italy | + 6' 18" |
| 4 | Jean Brankart (BEL) | Belgium | + 10' 44" |
| 5 | Raphaël Géminiani (FRA) | France | + 12' 20" |
| 6 | Giancarlo Astrua (ITA) | Italy | + 12' 44" |
| 7 | Wim van Est (NED) | Netherlands | + 12' 50" |
| 8 | Vincent Vitetta (FRA) | France – South-East | + 13' 56" |
| 9 | Charly Gaul (LUX) | Luxembourg/International | + 14' 00" |
| 10 | Alexandre Close (BEL) | Belgium | + 18' 41" |

== Rest Day 2 ==
23 July 1955 - Ax-les-Thermes

== Stage 16 ==
24 July 1955 - Ax-les-Thermes to Toulouse, 123 km (76 mi)

Stage 16 result

| Rank | Rider | Team | Time |
|---|---|---|---|
| 1 | Rik Van Steenbergen (BEL) | Belgium | 2h 57' 09" |
| 2 | Rino Benedetti (ITA) | Italy | s.t. |
| 3 | Miguel Poblet (ESP) | Spain | s.t. |
| 4 | Stan Ockers (BEL) | Belgium | s.t. |
| 5 | Wim van Est (NED) | Netherlands | s.t. |
| 6 | Russell Mockridge (AUS) | Luxembourg/International | s.t. |
| 7 | Jean-Marie Cieleska (FRA) | France – North-East/Centre | s.t. |
| 8 | Gilbert Bauvin (FRA) | France – North-East/Centre | s.t. |
| 9 | Pierre Ruby (FRA) | France – West | s.t. |
| 10 | André Darrigade (FRA) | France | s.t. |

General classification after stage 16

| Rank | Rider | Team | Time |
|---|---|---|---|
| 1 | Antonin Rolland (FRA) | France | 94h 59' 42" |
| 2 | Louison Bobet (FRA) | France | + 4' 53" |
| 3 | Pasquale Fornara (ITA) | Italy | + 6' 18" |
| 4 | Jean Brankart (BEL) | Belgium | + 10' 44" |
| 5 | Raphaël Géminiani (FRA) | France | + 12' 20" |
| 6 | Giancarlo Astrua (ITA) | Italy | + 12' 44" |
| 7 | Wim van Est (NED) | Netherlands | + 12' 50" |
| 8 | Vincent Vitetta (FRA) | France – South-East | + 13' 56" |
| 9 | Charly Gaul (LUX) | Luxembourg/International | + 14' 00" |
| 10 | Alexandre Close (BEL) | Belgium | + 18' 41" |

== Stage 17 ==
25 July 1955 - Toulouse to Saint-Gaudens, 250 km (160 mi)

Stage 17 result

| Rank | Rider | Team | Time |
|---|---|---|---|
| 1 | Charly Gaul (LUX) | Luxembourg/International | 7h 31' 31" |
| 2 | Louison Bobet (FRA) | France | + 1' 24" |
| 3 | Giancarlo Astrua (ITA) | Italy | + 3' 18" |
| 4 | Stan Ockers (BEL) | Belgium | s.t. |
| 5 | Jesús Loroño (ESP) | Spain | s.t. |
| 6 | Raphaël Géminiani (FRA) | France | s.t. |
| 7 | Jean Brankart (BEL) | Belgium | s.t. |
| 8 | Agostino Coletto (ITA) | Italy | + 3' 23" |
| 9 | Jacky Bovay (SUI) | Switzerland | s.t. |
| 10 | Pasquale Fornara (ITA) | Italy | + 3' 26" |

General classification after stage 17

| Rank | Rider | Team | Time |
|---|---|---|---|
| 1 | Louison Bobet (FRA) | France | 102h 37' 00" |
| 2 | Antonin Rolland (FRA) | France | + 3' 08" |
| 3 | Pasquale Fornara (ITA) | Italy | + 3' 57" |
| 4 | Charly Gaul (LUX) | Luxembourg/International | + 7' 13" |
| 5 | Jean Brankart (BEL) | Belgium | + 8' 15" |
| 6 | Raphaël Géminiani (FRA) | France | + 9' 51" |
| 7 | Giancarlo Astrua (ITA) | Italy | + 10' 15" |
| 8 | Vincent Vitetta (FRA) | France – South-East | + 17' 04" |
| 9 | Stan Ockers (BEL) | Belgium | + 19' 36" |
| 10 | Alexandre Close (BEL) | Belgium | + 21' 49" |

== Stage 18 ==
26 July 1955 - Saint-Gaudens to Pau, 205 km (127 mi)

Stage 18 result

| Rank | Rider | Team | Time |
|---|---|---|---|
| 1 | Jean Brankart (BEL) | Belgium | 6h 39' 39" |
| 2 | Louison Bobet (FRA) | France | s.t. |
| 3 | Charly Gaul (LUX) | Luxembourg/International | s.t. |
| 4 | Raphaël Géminiani (FRA) | France | s.t. |
| 5 | Stan Ockers (BEL) | Belgium | + 2' 26" |
| 6 | Bernardo Ruiz (ESP) | Spain | s.t. |
| 7 | Raymond Impanis (BEL) | Belgium | s.t. |
| 8 | Roger Buchonnet (FRA) | France – North-East/Centre | s.t. |
| 9 | Jan Nolten (NED) | Netherlands | s.t. |
| 10 | Antonin Rolland (FRA) | France | s.t. |

General classification after stage 18

| Rank | Rider | Team | Time |
|---|---|---|---|
| 1 | Louison Bobet (FRA) | France | 109h 16' 09" |
| 2 | Antonin Rolland (FRA) | France | + 6' 04" |
| 3 | Charly Gaul (LUX) | Luxembourg/International | + 7' 43" |
| 4 | Jean Brankart (BEL) | Belgium | + 7' 45" |
| 5 | Raphaël Géminiani (FRA) | France | + 10' 21" |
| 6 | Giancarlo Astrua (ITA) | Italy | + 13' 11" |
| 7 | Pasquale Fornara (ITA) | Italy | + 14' 56" |
| 8 | Stan Ockers (BEL) | Belgium | + 22' 32" |
| 9 | Alexandre Close (BEL) | Belgium | + 24' 45" |
| 10 | Maurice Quentin (FRA) | France – West | + 28' 12" |

== Stage 19 ==
27 July 1955 - Pau to Bordeaux, 195 km (121 mi)

Stage 19 result

| Rank | Rider | Team | Time |
|---|---|---|---|
| 1 | Wout Wagtmans (NED) | Netherlands | 5h 15' 38" |
| 2 | Max Schellenberg (SUI) | Switzerland | s.t. |
| 3 | Gilbert Bauvin (FRA) | France – North-East/Centre | s.t. |
| 4 | Denilo Barozzi (ITA) | Italy | s.t. |
| 5 | Bernard Gauthier (FRA) | France | s.t. |
| 6 | Henri Sitek (FRA) | France – West | s.t. |
| 7 | André Darrigade (FRA) | France | + 4' 54" |
| 8 | Alessandro Fantini (ITA) | Italy | s.t. |
| 9 | Louis Caput (FRA) | France – Île-de-France | s.t. |
| 10 | Roger Buchonnet (FRA) | France – North-East/Centre | s.t. |

General classification after stage 19

| Rank | Rider | Team | Time |
|---|---|---|---|
| 1 | Louison Bobet (FRA) | France | 114h 37' 17" |
| 2 | Antonin Rolland (FRA) | France | + 6' 04" |
| 3 | Charly Gaul (LUX) | Luxembourg/International | + 7' 43" |
| 4 | Jean Brankart (BEL) | Belgium | + 7' 45" |
| 5 | Raphaël Géminiani (FRA) | France | + 10' 21" |
| 6 | Giancarlo Astrua (ITA) | Italy | + 13' 11" |
| 7 | Pasquale Fornara (ITA) | Italy | + 14' 56" |
| 8 | Stan Ockers (BEL) | Belgium | + 22' 32" |
| 9 | Alexandre Close (BEL) | Belgium | + 24' 45" |
| 10 | Maurice Quentin (FRA) | France – West | + 28' 12" |

== Stage 20 ==
28 July 1955 - Bordeaux to Poitiers, 243 km (151 mi)

Stage 20 result

| Rank | Rider | Team | Time |
|---|---|---|---|
| 1 | Jean Forestier (FRA) | France | 7h 24' 12" |
| 2 | Gilbert Bauvin (FRA) | France – North-East/Centre | s.t. |
| 3 | Wim van Est (NED) | Netherlands | s.t. |
| 4 | Bruno Monti (ITA) | Italy | s.t. |
| 5 | Raymond Hoorelbeke (FRA) | France – Île-de-France | s.t. |
| 6 | Jan Nolten (NED) | Netherlands | s.t. |
| 7 | Jean Stablinski (FRA) | France – North-East/Centre | s.t. |
| 8 | Hein Van Breenen (NED) | Netherlands | s.t. |
| 9 | Rino Benedetti (ITA) | Italy | + 17" |
| 10 | Claude Colette (FRA) | France – West | + 35" |

General classification after stage 20

| Rank | Rider | Team | Time |
|---|---|---|---|
| 1 | Louison Bobet (FRA) | France | 122h 09' 04" |
| 2 | Antonin Rolland (FRA) | France | + 6' 04" |
| 3 | Charly Gaul (LUX) | Luxembourg/International | + 7' 43" |
| 4 | Jean Brankart (BEL) | Belgium | + 7' 45" |
| 5 | Raphaël Géminiani (FRA) | France | + 10' 21" |
| 6 | Giancarlo Astrua (ITA) | Italy | + 13' 11" |
| 7 | Pasquale Fornara (ITA) | Italy | + 14' 56" |
| 8 | Stan Ockers (BEL) | Belgium | + 22' 32" |
| 9 | Alexandre Close (BEL) | Belgium | + 24' 45" |
| 10 | Maurice Quentin (FRA) | France – West | + 28' 12" |

== Stage 21 ==
29 July 1955 - Châtellerault to Tours, 68.6 km (42.6 mi) (ITT)

Stage 21 result

| Rank | Rider | Team | Time |
|---|---|---|---|
| 1 | Jean Brankart (BEL) | Belgium | 1h 39' 51" |
| 2 | Pasquale Fornara (ITA) | Italy | + 10" |
| 3 | Louison Bobet (FRA) | France | + 1' 52" |
| 4 | Wim van Est (NED) | Netherlands | + 3' 54" |
| 5 | Fred De Bruyne (BEL) | Belgium | + 4' 58" |
| 6 | Charly Gaul (LUX) | Luxembourg/International | + 5' 39" |
| 7 | Pierre Ruby (FRA) | France – West | + 5' 41" |
| 8 | Wout Wagtmans (NED) | Netherlands | + 5' 56" |
| 9 | Agostino Coletto (ITA) | Italy | + 6' 00" |
| 10 | Raphaël Géminiani (FRA) | France | + 6' 32" |

General classification after stage 21

| Rank | Rider | Team | Time |
|---|---|---|---|
| 1 | Louison Bobet (FRA) | France | 123h 50' 47" |
| 2 | Jean Brankart (BEL) | Belgium | + 4' 53" |
| 3 | Charly Gaul (LUX) | Luxembourg/International | + 11' 30" |
| 4 | Pasquale Fornara (ITA) | Italy | + 12' 44" |
| 5 | Antonin Rolland (FRA) | France | + 13' 18" |
| 6 | Raphaël Géminiani (FRA) | France | + 15' 01" |
| 7 | Giancarlo Astrua (ITA) | Italy | + 18' 13" |
| 8 | Stan Ockers (BEL) | Belgium | + 27' 13" |
| 9 | Alexandre Close (BEL) | Belgium | + 31' 10" |
| 10 | François Mahé (FRA) | France | + 36' 27" |

== Stage 22 ==
30 July 1955 - Tours to Paris, 229 km (142 mi)

Stage 22 result

| Rank | Rider | Team | Time |
|---|---|---|---|
| 1 | Miguel Poblet (ESP) | Spain | 6h 38' 25" |
| 2 | André Darrigade (FRA) | France | + 14" |
| 3 | Alessandro Fantini (ITA) | Italy | s.t. |
| 4 | Stan Ockers (BEL) | Belgium | s.t. |
| 5 | Bruno Monti (ITA) | Italy | s.t. |
| 6 | Louis Caput (FRA) | France – Île-de-France | s.t. |
| 7 | Louison Bobet (FRA) | France | s.t. |
| 8 | Rino Benedetti (ITA) | Italy | s.t. |
| 9 | Kurt Schneider (AUT) | Luxembourg/International | s.t. |
| 10 | Wim van Est (NED) | Netherlands | s.t. |

General classification after stage 22

| Rank | Rider | Team | Time |
|---|---|---|---|
| 1 | Louison Bobet (FRA) | France | 130h 29' 26" |
| 2 | Jean Brankart (BEL) | Belgium | + 4' 53" |
| 3 | Charly Gaul (LUX) | Luxembourg/International | + 11' 30" |
| 4 | Pasquale Fornara (ITA) | Italy | + 12' 44" |
| 5 | Antonin Rolland (FRA) | France | + 13' 18" |
| 6 | Raphaël Géminiani (FRA) | France | + 15' 01" |
| 7 | Giancarlo Astrua (ITA) | Italy | + 18' 13" |
| 8 | Stan Ockers (BEL) | Belgium | + 27' 13" |
| 9 | Alexandre Close (BEL) | Belgium | + 31' 10" |
| 10 | François Mahé (FRA) | France | + 36' 27" |
