= 1955 Tour de France, Stage 1a to Stage 11 =

Cycling race stages

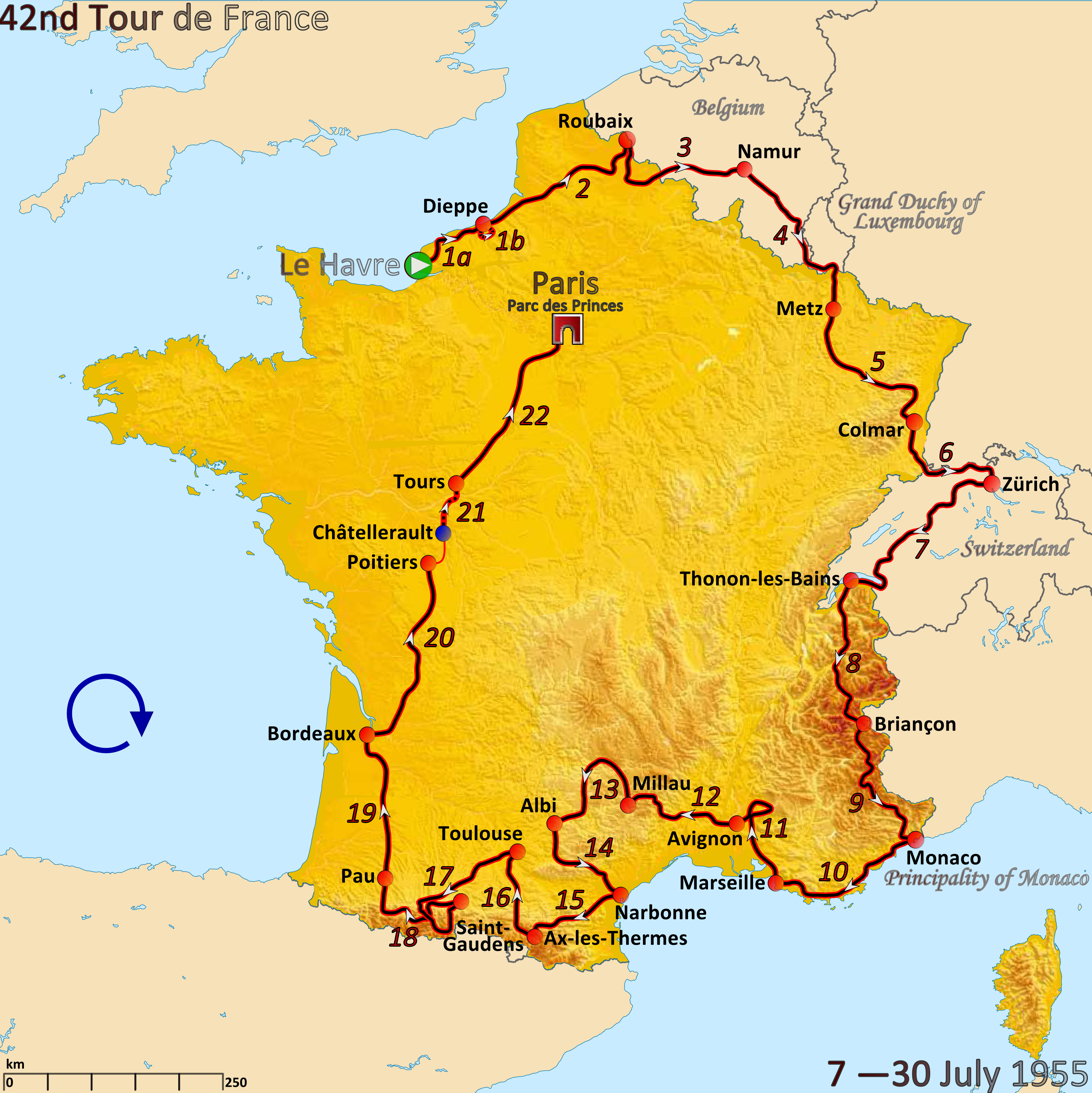
Route of the 1955 Tour de France

The 1955 Tour de France was the 42nd edition of Tour de France, one of cycling's Grand Tours. The Tour began in Le Havre with a flat stage on 7 July and Stage 11 occurred on 18 July with a mountainous stage to Avignon. The race finished in Paris on 30 July.

== Stage 1a ==
7 July 1955 - Le Havre to Dieppe, 102 km (63.4 mi)

Stage 1a result and General Classification after Stage 1a

Rank	Rider	Team	Time
1	Miguel Poblet (ESP)	Spain	2h 39' 31"
2	Louis Caput (FRA)	France – Île-de-France	s.t.
3	Edgard Sorgeloos (BEL)	Belgium	s.t.
4	Wout Wagtmans (NED)	Netherlands	s.t.
5	Eugène Telotte (FRA)	France – Île-de-France	s.t.
6	Giancarlo Astrua (ITA)	Italy	s.t.
7	Fred De Bruyne (BEL)	Belgium	s.t.
8	Jean Robic (FRA)	France – West	s.t.
9	Agostino Coletto (ITA)	Italy	s.t.
10	Kurt Schneider (AUT)	Luxembourg/International	s.t.

General classification after stage 1a

Rank	Rider	Team	Time
1	Miguel Poblet (ESP)	Spain	2h 38' 31"
2	Louis Caput (FRA)	France – Île-de-France	+ 30"
3	Edgard Sorgeloos (BEL)	Belgium	+ 1' 00"
4	Wout Wagtmans (NED)	Netherlands	s.t.
5	Eugène Telotte (FRA)	France – Île-de-France	s.t.
6	Giancarlo Astrua (ITA)	Italy	s.t.
7	Fred De Bruyne (BEL)	Belgium	s.t.
8	Jean Robic (FRA)	France – West	s.t.
9	Agostino Coletto (ITA)	Italy	s.t.
10	Kurt Schneider (AUT)	Luxembourg/International	s.t.

== Stage 1b ==
7 July 1955 - Dieppe, 12.5 km (7.8 mi) (TTT)

Stage 1b result

Rank	Team	Time
1	Netherlands	49' 15"
2	France	+ 15"
3	Italy	+ 54"
4	France – North-East/Centre	s.t.
5	Belgium	+ 1' 24"
6	France – Île-de-France	+ 1' 27"
7	Spain	+ 1' 39"
8	France – West	+ 1' 42"
9	Luxembourg/International	+ 1' 54"
10	France – South-West	+ 1' 57"

General classification after stage 1b

Rank	Rider	Team	Time
1	Miguel Poblet (ESP)	Spain	2h 55' 29"
2	Louis Caput (FRA)	France – Île-de-France	+ 26"
3	Wout Wagtmans (NED)	Netherlands	+ 27"
4	Giancarlo Astrua (ITA)	Italy	+ 45"
5	Agostino Coletto (ITA)	Italy	s.t.
6	Edgard Sorgeloos (BEL)	Belgium	+ 55"
7	Fred De Bruyne (BEL)	Belgium	s.t.
8	Eugène Telotte (FRA)	France – Île-de-France	+ 56"
9	Jean Robic (FRA)	France – West	+ 1' 01"
10	Kurt Schneider (AUT)	Luxembourg/International	+ 1' 05"

== Stage 2 ==
8 July 1955 - Dieppe to Roubaix, 204 km (126.8 mi)

Stage 2 result

Rank	Rider	Team	Time
1	Antonin Rolland (FRA)	France	5h 54' 00"
2	Wout Wagtmans (NED)	Netherlands	s.t.
3	Fred De Bruyne (BEL)	Belgium	s.t.
4	Eugène Telotte (FRA)	France – Île-de-France	s.t.
5	Claude Le Ber (FRA)	France – West	s.t.
6	Robert Varnajo (FRA)	France – West	+ 1' 37"
7	Jacques Vivier (FRA)	France – South-West	s.t.
8	Roger Hassenforder (FRA)	France – North-East/Centre	s.t.
9	Raymond Impanis (BEL)	Belgium	+ 1' 53"
10	Isaac Vitré (FRA)	France – Île-de-France	s.t.

General classification after stage 2

Rank	Rider	Team	Time
1	Wout Wagtmans (NED)	Netherlands	8h 49' 26"
2	Fred De Bruyne (BEL)	Belgium	+ 58"
3	Eugène Telotte (FRA)	France – Île-de-France	+ 59"
4	Antonin Rolland (FRA)	France	+ 1' 48"
5	Miguel Poblet (ESP)	Spain	+ 2' 26"
6	Louis Caput (FRA)	France – Île-de-France	+ 2' 52"
7	Giancarlo Astrua (ITA)	Italy	+ 3' 11"
8	Agostino Coletto (ITA)	Italy	s.t.
9	Claude Le Ber (FRA)	France – West	+ 3' 17"
10	Edgard Sorgeloos (BEL)	Belgium	+ 3' 21"

== Stage 3 ==
9 July 1955 - Roubaix to Namur, 210 km (130 mi)

Stage 3 result

Rank	Rider	Team	Time
1	Louison Bobet (FRA)	France	6h 37' 39"
2	Richard Van Genechten (BEL)	Belgium	s.t.
3	Bruno Monti (ITA)	Italy	s.t.
4	Wout Wagtmans (NED)	Netherlands	s.t.
5	Raymond Impanis (BEL)	Belgium	+ 15"
6	Jean Robic (FRA)	France – West	s.t.
7	Jean Malléjac (FRA)	France	s.t.
8	Jean Bobet (FRA)	France	+ 17"
9	Antonin Rolland (FRA)	France	+ 21"
10	Fernand Picot (FRA)	France – West	+ 37"

General classification after stage 3

Rank	Rider	Team	Time
1	Wout Wagtmans (NED)	Netherlands	15h 27' 05"
2	Antonin Rolland (FRA)	France	+ 2' 09"
3	Jean Robic (FRA)	France – West	+ 3' 42"
4	Louison Bobet (FRA)	France	+ 4' 11"
5	Giancarlo Astrua (ITA)	Italy	+ 4' 32"
6	Richard Van Genechten (BEL)	Belgium	+ 5' 04"
7	Raymond Impanis (BEL)	Belgium	+ 5' 19"
8	Bruno Monti (ITA)	Italy	+ 5' 24"
9	Jean Malléjac (FRA)	France	+ 5' 26"
10	Jean Bobet (FRA)	France	+ 5' 28"

== Stage 4 ==
10 July 1955 - Namur to Metz, 225 km (140 mi)

Stage 4 result

Rank	Rider	Team	Time
1	Willy Kemp (LUX)	Luxembourg/International	6h 41' 07"
2	Maurice Quentin (FRA)	France – West	+ 8"
3	Pierre Molinéris (FRA)	France – South-East	s.t.
4	Ugo Anzile (FRA)	France – North-East/Centre	s.t.
5	Bernard Bultel (FRA)	France – West	s.t.
6	François Mahé (FRA)	France	+ 20"
7	Antonin Rolland (FRA)	France	s.t.
8	Eugenio Bertoglio (ITA)	Italy	+ 31"
9	Francisco Alomar Florit (ESP)	Spain	+ 35"
10	Gerrit Voorting (NED)	Netherlands	+ 7' 06"

General classification after stage 4

Rank	Rider	Team	Time
1	Antonin Rolland (FRA)	France	22h 10' 41"
2	Wout Wagtmans (NED)	Netherlands	+ 9' 21"
3	Jean Robic (FRA)	France – West	+ 13' 03"
4	Louison Bobet (FRA)	France	+ 13' 32"
5	Giancarlo Astrua (ITA)	Italy	+ 13' 53"
6	Richard Van Genechten (BEL)	Belgium	+ 14' 25"
7	Bernard Bultel (FRA)	France – West	+ 14' 28"
8	Raymond Impanis (BEL)	Belgium	+ 14' 40"
9	Bruno Monti (ITA)	Italy	+ 14' 45"
10	Jean Malléjac (FRA)	France	+ 14' 47"

== Stage 5 ==
11 July 1955 - Metz to Colmar, 229 km (142 mi)

Stage 5 result

Rank	Rider	Team	Time
1	Roger Hassenforder (FRA)	France – North-East/Centre	5h 57' 54"
2	Vincent Vitetta (FRA)	France – South-East	s.t.
3	Jean Bobet (FRA)	France	s.t.
4	Francis Siguenza (FRA)	France – Île-de-France	s.t.
5	Maurice Lampre (FRA)	France – South-West	+ 8' 27"
6	Louis Bergaud (FRA)	France – South-West	s.t.
7	Jean Dacquay (FRA)	France – Île-de-France	s.t.
8	Antonio Gelabert (ESP)	Spain	s.t.
9	Jan Adriaensens (BEL)	Belgium	s.t.
10	Francisco Alomar Florit (ESP)	Spain	s.t.

General classification after stage 5

Rank	Rider	Team	Time
1	Antonin Rolland (FRA)	France	28h 17' 35"
2	Roger Hassenforder (FRA)	France – North-East/Centre	+ 4' 56"
3	Jean Bobet (FRA)	France	+ 5' 49"
4	Wout Wagtmans (NED)	Netherlands	+ 9' 21"
5	Jean Robic (FRA)	France – West	+ 13' 03"
6	Louison Bobet (FRA)	France	+ 13' 32"
7	Giancarlo Astrua (ITA)	Italy	+ 13' 53"
8	Vincent Vitetta (FRA)	France – South-East	+ 14' 11"
9	Richard Van Genechten (BEL)	Belgium	+ 14' 25"
10	Raymond Impanis (BEL)	Belgium	+ 14' 40"

== Stage 6 ==
12 July 1955 - Colmar to Zürich, 195 km (121 mi)

Stage 6 result

Rank	Rider	Team	Time
1	André Darrigade (FRA)	France	4h 32' 14"
2	Ferdinand Kübler (SUI)	Switzerland	s.t.
3	Pierre Molinéris (FRA)	France – South-East	s.t.
4	Pietro Giudici (ITA)	Italy	s.t.
5	Fred De Bruyne (BEL)	Belgium	s.t.
6	Pasquale Fornara (ITA)	Italy	s.t.
7	Jean Dacquay (FRA)	France – Île-de-France	s.t.
8	Wies Van Dongen (NED)	Netherlands	+ 3' 22"
9	Pierre Ruby (FRA)	France – West	+ 5' 03"
10	Rik Van Steenbergen (BEL)	Belgium	s.t.

General classification after stage 6

Rank	Rider	Team	Time
1	Antonin Rolland (FRA)	France	32h 55' 20"
2	Roger Hassenforder (FRA)	France – North-East/Centre	+ 4' 56"
3	Wout Wagtmans (NED)	Netherlands	+ 9' 21"
4	Pasquale Fornara (ITA)	Italy	+ 13' 02"
5	Jean Robic (FRA)	France – West	+ 13' 03"
6	Louison Bobet (FRA)	France	+ 13' 32"
7	Giancarlo Astrua (ITA)	Italy	+ 13' 53"
8	Vincent Vitetta (FRA)	France – South-East	+ 14' 11"
9	Richard Van Genechten (BEL)	Belgium	+ 14' 25"
10	Raymond Impanis (BEL)	Belgium	+ 14' 40"

== Stage 7 ==
13 July 1955 - Zürich to Thonon-les-Bains, 267 km (166 mi)

Stage 7 result

Rank	Rider	Team	Time
1	Jos Hinsen (NED)	Netherlands	7h 22' 01"
2	Alessandro Fantini (ITA)	Italy	+ 13' 47"
3	Louis Caput (FRA)	France – Île-de-France	s.t.
4	Jean Stablinski (FRA)	France – North-East/Centre	s.t.
5	Raymond Hoorelbeke (FRA)	France – Île-de-France	s.t.
6	Wim van Est (NED)	Netherlands	s.t.
7	Roger Walkowiak (FRA)	France – North-East/Centre	s.t.
8	Jean Dacquay (FRA)	France – Île-de-France	s.t.
9	Bernard Gauthier (FRA)	France	s.t.
10	Miguel Poblet (ESP)	Spain	+ 17' 33"

General classification after stage 7

Rank	Rider	Team	Time
1	Wim van Est (NED)	Netherlands	40h 34' 29"
2	Antonin Rolland (FRA)	France	+ 25"
3	Roger Hassenforder (FRA)	France – North-East/Centre	+ 5' 21"
4	Alessandro Fantini (ITA)	Italy	+ 9' 15"
5	Wout Wagtmans (NED)	Netherlands	+ 9' 46"
6	Jos Hinsen (NED)	Netherlands	+ 11' 40"
7	Pasquale Fornara (ITA)	Italy	+ 13' 27"
8	Jean Robic (FRA)	France – West	+ 13' 28"
9	Louison Bobet (FRA)	France	+ 13' 57"
10	Giancarlo Astrua (ITA)	Italy	+ 14' 18"

== Stage 8 ==
14 July 1955 - Thonon-les-Bains to Briançon, 253 km (157 mi)

Stage 8 result

Rank	Rider	Team	Time
1	Charly Gaul (LUX)	Luxembourg/International	7h 42' 55"
2	Ferdinand Kübler (SUI)	Switzerland	+ 13' 47"
3	Agostino Coletto (ITA)	Italy	s.t.
4	Louison Bobet (FRA)	France	s.t.
5	Antonio Gelabert (ESP)	Spain	s.t.
6	Vincent Vitetta (FRA)	France – South-East	s.t.
7	Pasquale Fornara (ITA)	Italy	s.t.
8	Jean Brankart (BEL)	Belgium	s.t.
9	Raphaël Géminiani (FRA)	France	+ 15' 46"
10	Antonin Rolland (FRA)	France	s.t.

General classification after stage 8

Rank	Rider	Team	Time
1	Antonin Rolland (FRA)	France	48h 33' 35"
2	Wim van Est (NED)	Netherlands	+ 7' 25"
3	Charly Gaul (LUX)	Luxembourg/International	+ 10' 17"
4	Wout Wagtmans (NED)	Netherlands	+ 11' 02"
5	Pasquale Fornara (ITA)	Italy	+ 11' 03"
6	Louison Bobet (FRA)	France	+ 11' 33"
7	Vincent Vitetta (FRA)	France – South-East	+ 12' 12"
8	Jean Brankart (BEL)	Belgium	+ 13' 40"
9	Jean Robic (FRA)	France – West	+ 14' 44"
10	Richard Van Genechten (BEL)	Belgium	+ 16' 21"

== Stage 9 ==
15 July 1955 - Briançon to Monaco, 275 km (171 mi)

Stage 9 result

Rank	Rider	Team	Time
1	Raphaël Géminiani (FRA)	France	8h 15' 50"
2	Gilbert Bauvin (FRA)	France – North-East/Centre	+ 2' 00"
3	Pasquale Fornara (ITA)	Italy	s.t.
4	Antonin Rolland (FRA)	France	s.t.
5	Louison Bobet (FRA)	France	s.t.
6	Giancarlo Astrua (ITA)	Italy	s.t.
7	Carlo Clerici (SUI)	Switzerland	+ 3' 13"
8	Agostino Coletto (ITA)	Italy	+ 3' 28"
9	Roger Walkowiak (FRA)	France – North-East/Centre	+ 3' 33"
10	Charly Gaul (LUX)	Luxembourg/International	+ 3' 36"

General classification after stage 9

Rank	Rider	Team	Time
1	Antonin Rolland (FRA)	France	56h 51' 25"
2	Pasquale Fornara (ITA)	Italy	+ 11' 03"
3	Louison Bobet (FRA)	France	+ 11' 33"
4	Charly Gaul (LUX)	Luxembourg/International	+ 11' 53"
5	Vincent Vitetta (FRA)	France – South-East	+ 13' 56"
6	Jean Brankart (BEL)	Belgium	+ 16' 05"
7	Giancarlo Astrua (ITA)	Italy	+ 17' 24"
8	Raphaël Géminiani (FRA)	France	+ 19' 00"
9	Jean Malléjac (FRA)	France	+ 25' 10"
10	Carlo Clerici (SUI)	Switzerland	+ 25' 19"

== Rest Day 1 ==
16 July 1955 - Monaco

== Stage 10 ==
17 July 1955 - Monaco to Marseille, 240 km (150 mi)

Stage 10 result

Rank	Rider	Team	Time
1	Lucien Lazaridès (FRA)	France – South-East	6h 45' 12"
2	Francisco Alomar Florit (ESP)	Spain	s.t.
3	Roger Buchonnet (FRA)	France – North-East/Centre	+ 1' 24"
4	André Darrigade (FRA)	France	+ 4' 43"
5	Wout Wagtmans (NED)	Netherlands	s.t.
6	Denilo Barozzi (ITA)	Italy	s.t.
7	Jean Stablinski (FRA)	France – North-East/Centre	+ 6' 05"
8	Wim van Est (NED)	Netherlands	s.t.
9	Alessandro Fantini (ITA)	Italy	+ 6' 22"
10	Rino Benedetti (ITA)	Italy	s.t.

General classification after stage 10

Rank	Rider	Team	Time
1	Antonin Rolland (FRA)	France	63h 44' 49"
2	Pasquale Fornara (ITA)	Italy	+ 11' 03"
3	Louison Bobet (FRA)	France	+ 11' 33"
4	Charly Gaul (LUX)	Luxembourg/International	+ 11' 53"
5	Vincent Vitetta (FRA)	France – South-East	+ 13' 56"
6	Jean Brankart (BEL)	Belgium	+ 16' 05"
7	Giancarlo Astrua (ITA)	Italy	+ 17' 24"
8	Raphaël Géminiani (FRA)	France	+ 19' 00"
9	Jean Malléjac (FRA)	France	+ 25' 10"
10	Carlo Clerici (SUI)	Switzerland	+ 25' 19"

== Stage 11 ==
18 July 1955 - Marseille to Avignon, 198 km (123 mi)

Stage 11 result

Rank	Rider	Team	Time
1	Louison Bobet (FRA)	France	5h 42' 32"
2	Jean Brankart (BEL)	Belgium	+ 49"
3	Pasquale Fornara (ITA)	Italy	+ 55"
4	Agostino Coletto (ITA)	Italy	s.t.
5	Giancarlo Astrua (ITA)	Italy	+ 1' 00"
6	Wout Wagtmans (NED)	Netherlands	+ 5' 40"
7	Antonin Rolland (FRA)	France	s.t.
8	Vincent Vitetta (FRA)	France – South-East	s.t.
9	Jan Nolten (NED)	Netherlands	+ 5' 59"
10	Raphaël Géminiani (FRA)	France	s.t.

General classification after stage 11

Rank	Rider	Team	Time
1	Antonin Rolland (FRA)	France	69h 33' 01"
2	Louison Bobet (FRA)	France	+ 4' 53"
3	Pasquale Fornara (ITA)	Italy	+ 6' 18"
4	Jean Brankart (BEL)	Belgium	+ 10' 44"
5	Charly Gaul (LUX)	Luxembourg/International	+ 12' 12"
6	Giancarlo Astrua (ITA)	Italy	+ 12' 44"
7	Vincent Vitetta (FRA)	France – South-East	+ 13' 56"
8	Raphaël Géminiani (FRA)	France	+ 19' 19"
9	Maurice Quentin (FRA)	France – West	+ 29' 07"
10	Wim van Est (NED)	Netherlands	+ 36' 55"
