= 1955 Tour de France =

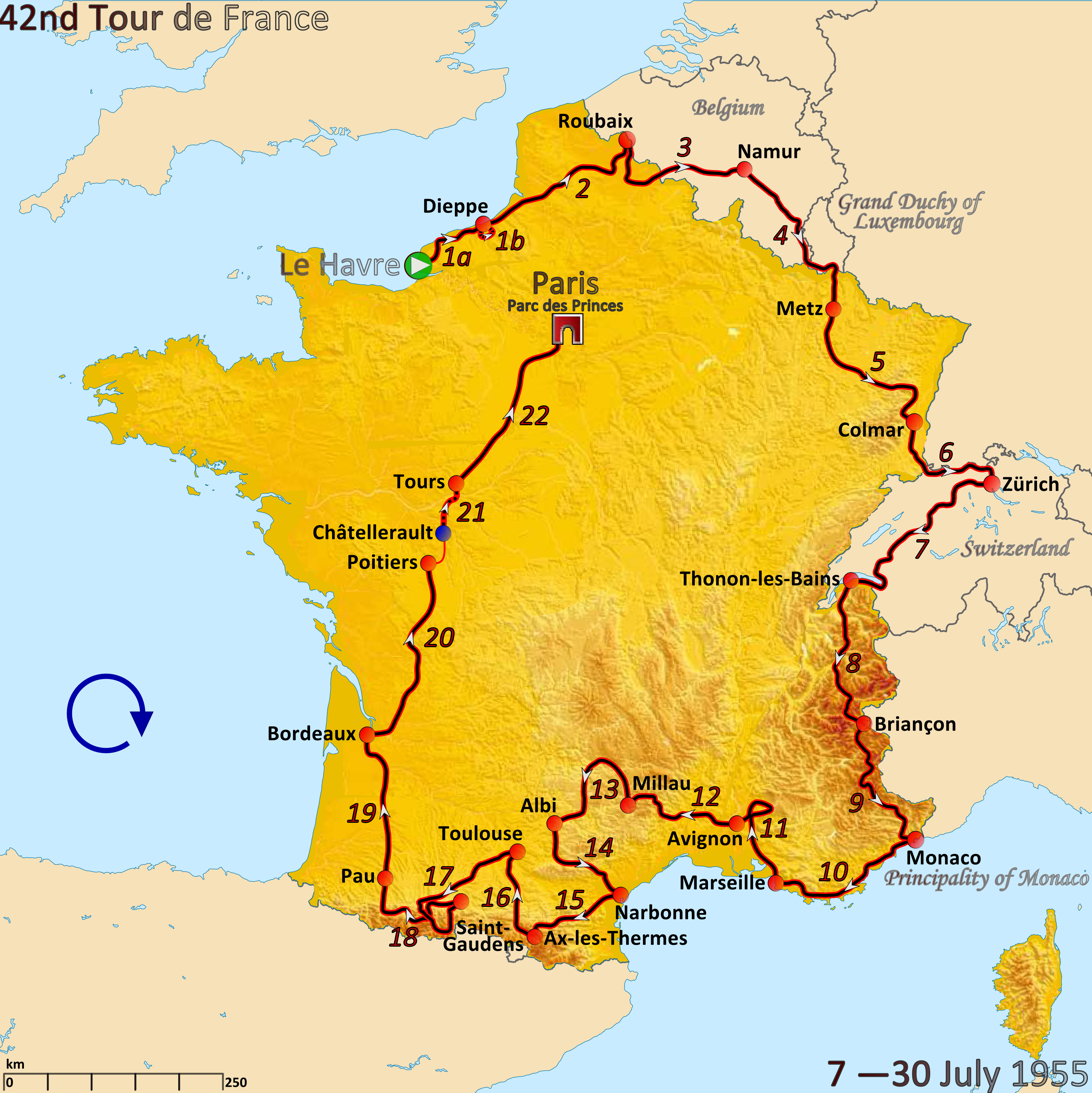
- Route of the 1955 Tour de France followed clockwise, starting in Le Havre and finishing in Paris

Race details
- Dates: 7–30 July 1955
- Stages: 22
- Distance: 4,495 km (2,793 mi)
- Winning time: 130h 29' 26"

Results
Jersey awarded to the overall winner	Winner	Louison Bobet (FRA)	(France)
	Second	Jean Brankart (BEL)	(Belgium)
	Third	Charly Gaul (LUX)	(Luxembourg/Mixed)
Jersey awarded to the points classification winner	Points	Stan Ockers (BEL)	(Belgium)
	Mountains	Charly Gaul (LUX)	(Luxembourg/Mixed)
	Combativity	Charly Gaul (LUX)	(Luxembourg/Mixed)
	Team	France	

The 1955 Tour de France was the 42nd edition of the Tour de France, taking place from 7 to 30 July. It consisted of 22 stages over 4,495 km (2,793 mi). The race was won by Louison Bobet, the last of his three consecutive wins.

== Teams ==
As was the custom since the 1930 Tour de France, the 1955 Tour de France was contested by national and regional teams. Eight national teams were sent, with 10 cyclists each from France, Belgium, Spain, Great Britain, the Netherlands, Italy, Switzerland, and a mixed team consisting of Luxembourgian, Austrian, West German and Australian cyclists. France additionally sent five regional teams from 10 cyclists each, divided into Île-de-France, North-East/Centre, West, South-East and South-West. In total, 120 cyclists started the race. The mixed team included cyclists from West-Germany, which was the first time since the Second World War that German cyclists rode the Tour. The Great Britain team was the first British team in Tour history.

The teams entering the race were:

- France
- Belgium
- Spain
- Great Britain
- Netherlands
- Italy
- Luxembourg/Mixed
- Switzerland
- Île-de-France
- North-East/Centre
- West
- South-East
- South-West

== Pre-race favourites ==
Louison Bobet, the winner of the 1953 Tour de France and the 1954 Tour de France, had done an aggressive preparation in the early season before the Tour de France, aiming for his third victory. Bobet was the main favourite, also because he was the world champion.

== Route and stages ==
The 1955 Tour de France started on 7 July, and had two rest days, in Monaco and Ax-les-Thermes. The 1955 Tour saw the introduction of the photo finish. The highest point of elevation in the race was 2,556 m (8,386 ft) at the summit tunnel of the Col du Galibier mountain pass on stage 8.

Stage characteristics and winners
Stage	Date	Course	Distance	Type	Winner
1a	7 July	Le Havre to Dieppe	102 km (63 mi)	Plain stage	Miguel Poblet (ESP)
1b	7 July	Dieppe	12.5 km (8 mi)	Team time trial	Netherlands
2	8 July	Dieppe to Roubaix	204 km (127 mi)	Plain stage	Antonin Rolland (FRA)
3	9 July	Roubaix to Namur (Belgium)	210 km (130 mi)	Plain stage	Louison Bobet (FRA)
4	10 July	Namur (Belgium) to Metz	225 km (140 mi)	Plain stage	Willy Kemp (LUX)
5	11 July	Metz to Colmar	229 km (142 mi)	Plain stage	Roger Hassenforder (FRA)
6	12 July	Colmar to Zürich (Switzerland)	195 km (121 mi)	Plain stage	André Darrigade (FRA)
7	13 July	Zürich (Switzerland) to Thonon-les-Bains	267 km (166 mi)	Plain stage	Jos Hinsen (NED)
8	14 July	Thonon-les-Bains to Briançon	253 km (157 mi)	Stage with mountain(s)	Charly Gaul (LUX)
9	15 July	Briançon to Monaco	275 km (171 mi)	Stage with mountain(s)	Raphaël Géminiani (FRA)
	16 July	Monaco		Rest day	
10	17 July	Monaco to Marseille	240 km (149 mi)	Plain stage	Lucien Lazaridès (FRA)
11	18 July	Marseille to Avignon	198 km (123 mi)	Stage with mountain(s)	Louison Bobet (FRA)
12	19 July	Avignon to Millau	240 km (149 mi)	Stage with mountain(s)	Alessandro Fantini (ITA)
13	20 July	Millau to Albi	205 km (127 mi)	Plain stage	Daan de Groot (NED)
14	21 July	Albi to Narbonne	156 km (97 mi)	Stage with mountain(s)	Louis Caput (FRA)
15	22 July	Narbonne to Ax-les-Thermes	151 km (94 mi)	Plain stage	Luciano Pezzi (ITA)
	23 July	Ax-les-Thermes		Rest day	
16	24 July	Ax-les-Thermes to Toulouse	123 km (76 mi)	Plain stage	Rik Van Steenbergen (BEL)
17	25 July	Toulouse to Saint-Gaudens	250 km (155 mi)	Stage with mountain(s)	Charly Gaul (LUX)
18	26 July	Saint-Gaudens to Pau	205 km (127 mi)	Stage with mountain(s)	Jean Brankart (BEL)
19	27 July	Pau to Bordeaux	195 km (121 mi)	Plain stage	Wout Wagtmans (NED)
20	28 July	Bordeaux to Poitiers	243 km (151 mi)	Plain stage	Jean Forestier (FRA)
21	29 July	Châtellerault to Tours	68.6 km (43 mi)	Individual time trial	Jean Brankart (BEL)
22	30 July	Tours to Paris	229 km (142 mi)	Plain stage	Miguel Poblet (ESP)
	Total		4,495 km (2,793 mi)		

== Race overview ==
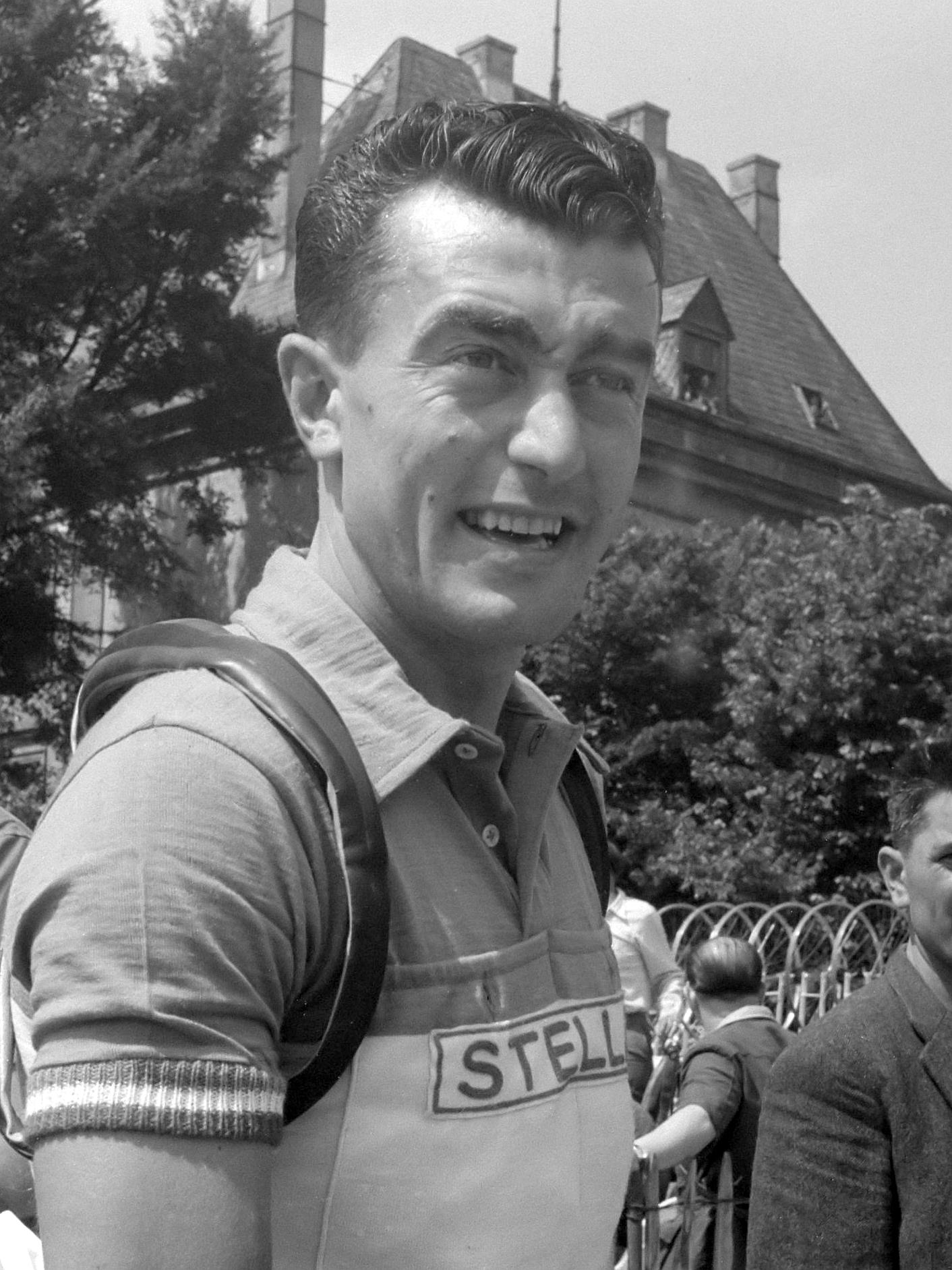
Louison Bobet (pictured in 1951), winner of the general classification

The first part of the first stage was won by Miguel Poblet, who became the first Spanish cyclist to wear the yellow jersey as leader of the general classification. The second and third stage saw small groups escaping from the peloton. In both stages, Wout Wagtmans and Antonin Rolland, one of Bobet's teammates, were present. Wagtmans became leader of the general classification, with Rolland in second place.

The first attack that was important for the general classification was in the fourth stage. Rolland was part of a group of nine cyclists that finished seven minutes before the rest. Rolland was the best-placed cyclist of those nine, and took the lead.

In the seventh stage, Rolland briefly lost that lead, because a group including Wim van Est escaped and gained more than seventeen minutes, which was just enough for Van Est to take over the lead. Van Est was sure to lose it in the next stage, which included high mountains.

In that eighth stage, Charly Gaul attacked early in the stage. Gaul was more than 23 minutes behind in the general classification, but got over the mountains quickly and won with 13 minutes, which put him in third place.

In the ninth stage, Gaul tried to do the same again, and got over the first three mountains alone. But because of a crash on the second mountain he lost time, and did not win the stage; instead he even lost a few minutes. During the eleventh stage, French cyclist Jean Malléjac collapsed and remained unconscious for 15 minutes. The Tour doctor who helped recognised that Malléjac's symptoms were identical to an amphetamine overdose, and told the team doctors to be more careful with doping. In that stage, Bobet got away on Mont Ventoux and nobody was able to follow him. He reached the top alone, and from there descended to the finish, 6 minutes ahead of Rolland, who was still the race leader. Bobet jumped to second place in the general classification.

The next challenge for the general classification were the Pyrénees mountains. In stage 17, Gaul made the pace, and most cyclists could not follow. Bobet could hold on for a long time, but at the finish lost 84 seconds to Gaul. Because Rolland lost more than seven minutes, Bobet took the lead.

In the eighteenth stage, it was again Gaul who attacked. This time, a small group including Bobet could follow him all the way. Rolland finished two minutes later, but was still in second place in the general classification. The time trial in the 21st stage was won by Jean Brankart, who jumped to second place in the general classification. Rolland lost more than nine minutes, and dropped to the fifth place in the general classification.

Bobet remained the leader, and his lead was not challenged in the last stage. Bobet became the first person in the Tour de France to win three Tours in a row.

== Classification leadership and minor prizes ==
The time that each cyclist required to finish each stage was recorded, and these times were added together for the general classification. If a cyclist had received a time bonus, it was subtracted from this total; all time penalties were added to this total. The cyclist with the least accumulated time was the race leader, identified by the yellow jersey.

The points classification was calculated in the same way as in 1954, following the calculation method from the Tours de France from 1905 to 1912. Points were given according to the ranking of the stage: the winner received one point, the next cyclist two points, and so on. These points were added, and the cyclist with the fewest points was the leader of the points classification. In 1955, this was won by Stan Ockers.

Points for the mountains classification were earned by reaching the mountain tops first. The system was almost the same as in 1954: there were two types of mountain tops: the hardest ones, in category 1, gave 10 points to the first cyclist, the easier ones, in category 2, gave 6 points to the first cyclist, and the easiest ones, in category 3, gave 3 points. Charly Gaul won this classification.

The team classification was calculated as the sum of the daily team classifications, and the daily team classification was calculated by adding the times in the stage result of the best three cyclists per team. It was won by the French team. The British team and the regional South West team finished with only two cyclists, so they were not eligible for the team classification.

In addition, there was a combativity award given after each stage to the cyclist considered most combative. The split stages each had a combined winner. The decision was made by a jury composed of journalists who gave points. The cyclist with the most points from votes in all stages led the combativity classification. Gaul won this classification, and was given overall the super-combativity award. The Souvenir Henri Desgrange was given in honour of Tour founder Henri Desgrange to the first rider to pass a point by his final residence, the "Villa Mia" in Beauvallon, Grimaud, on the French Riviera on stage 10. This prize was won by André Darrigade.

Classification leadership by stage
Stage	Winner	General classification	Points classification	Mountains classification (Note: No jersey was awarded to the leader of the mountains classification until a white jersey with red polka dots was introduced in 1975.)	Team classification	Combativity	
Stage	Winner	General classification	Points classification	Mountains classification	Team classification	Award	Classification
1a	Miguel Poblet	Miguel Poblet	Miguel Poblet	no award	Île-de-France	Claude Le Ber	Claude Le Ber
1b	Netherlands	Miguel Poblet	Miguel Poblet	no award	Italy	Claude Le Ber	Claude Le Ber
2	Antonin Rolland	Wout Wagtmans	Wout Wagtmans	no award	Île-de-France	Roger Hassenforder	Claude Le Ber
3	Louison Bobet	Wout Wagtmans	Wout Wagtmans	no award	France	Louison Bobet	Roger Hassenforder
4	Willy Kemp	Antonin Rolland	Wout Wagtmans	no award	France	Francisco Alomar	Roger Hassenforder
5	Roger Hassenforder	Antonin Rolland	Wout Wagtmans	Vincent Vitetta	France	Vincent Vitetta	Roger Hassenforder
6	André Darrigade	Antonin Rolland	Wout Wagtmans	Vincent Vitetta	France	Ferdinand Kübler	Roger Hassenforder
7	Jos Hinsen	Wim van Est	Wout Wagtmans	Vincent Vitetta	France	Jean Stablinski	Roger Hassenforder
8	Charly Gaul	Antonin Rolland	Wout Wagtmans	Charly Gaul	France	Charly Gaul	Roger Hassenforder
9	Raphaël Géminiani	Antonin Rolland	Miguel Poblet	Charly Gaul	France	Charly Gaul	Charly Gaul
10	Lucien Lazaridès	Antonin Rolland	Wout Wagtmans	Charly Gaul	France	Francisco Alomar	Charly Gaul
11	Louison Bobet	Antonin Rolland	Wout Wagtmans	Charly Gaul	France	Louison Bobet	Charly Gaul
12	Alessandro Fantini	Antonin Rolland	Wout Wagtmans	Charly Gaul	France	Nello Lauredi	Charly Gaul
13	Daan de Groot	Antonin Rolland	Wim van Est	Charly Gaul	France	Daan de Groot	Charly Gaul
14	Louis Caput	Antonin Rolland	Wim van Est	Charly Gaul	France	Max Cohen	Charly Gaul
15	Luciano Pezzi	Antonin Rolland	Stan Ockers	Charly Gaul	France	Jan Nolten	Charly Gaul
16	Rik Van Steenbergen	Antonin Rolland	Stan Ockers	Charly Gaul	France	Lucien Teisseire	Charly Gaul
17	Charly Gaul	Louison Bobet	Stan Ockers	Charly Gaul	France	Charly Gaul	Charly Gaul
18	Jean Brankart	Louison Bobet	Stan Ockers	Charly Gaul	France	Louison Bobet	Charly Gaul
19	Wout Wagtmans	Louison Bobet	Stan Ockers	Charly Gaul	France	Henri Sitek	Charly Gaul
20	Jean Forestier	Louison Bobet	Stan Ockers	Charly Gaul	France	Rino Benedetti	Charly Gaul
21	Jean Brankart	Louison Bobet	Stan Ockers	Charly Gaul	France	Jean Brankart	Charly Gaul
22	Miguel Poblet	Louison Bobet	Stan Ockers	Charly Gaul	France	Miguel Poblet	Charly Gaul
Final		Louison Bobet	Stan Ockers	Charly Gaul	France	Charly Gaul	

== Final standings ==
=== General classification ===
Final general classification (1–10)
Rank	Rider	Team	Time
1	Louison Bobet (FRA)	France	130h 29' 26"
2	Jean Brankart (BEL)	Belgium	+ 4' 53"
3	Charly Gaul (LUX)	Luxembourg/Mixed	+ 11' 30"
4	Pasquale Fornara (ITA)	Italy	+ 12' 44"
5	Antonin Rolland (FRA)	France	+ 13' 18"
6	Raphaël Géminiani (FRA)	France	+ 15' 01"
7	Giancarlo Astrua (ITA)	Italy	+ 18' 13"
8	Stan Ockers (BEL)	Belgium	+ 27' 13"
9	Alex Close (BEL)	Belgium	+ 31' 10"
10	François Mahé (FRA)	France	+ 36' 27"

Final general classification (11–69)
Rank	Rider	Team	Time
11	Maurice Quentin (FRA)	West	+ 36' 52"
12	Agostino Coletto (ITA)	Italy	+ 39' 14"
13	Raymond Impanis (BEL)	Belgium	+ 46' 03"
14	Jean Bobet (FRA)	France	+ 1h 00' 05"
15	Wim van Est (NED)	Netherlands	+ 1h 04' 50"
16	Vincent Vitetta (FRA)	South-East	+ 1h 05' 18"
17	Alfred De Bruyne (BEL)	Belgium	+ 1h 05' 29"
18	Gilbert Bauvin (FRA)	North-East/Centre	+ 1h 09' 58"
19	Wout Wagtmans (NED)	Netherlands	+ 1h 10' 16"
20	Jesús Loroño (ESP)	Spain	+ 1h 19' 25"
21	Jan Nolten (NED)	Netherlands	+ 1h 21' 45"
22	Bernardo Ruiz (ESP)	Spain	+ 1h 25' 48"
23	Bruno Monti (ITA)	Italy	+ 1h 36' 21"
24	Claude Colette (FRA)	West	+ 1h 40' 01"
25	Alessandro Fantini (ITA)	Italy	+ 1h 44' 45"
26	Miguel Poblet (ESP)	Spain	+ 1h 45' 30"
27	Hein van Breenen (NED)	Netherlands	+ 1h 49' 49"
28	Jan Adriaensens (BEL)	Belgium	+ 1h 57' 09"
29	Brian Robinson (GBR)	Great Britain	+ 1h 57' 10"
30	Pietro Giudici (ITA)	Italy	+ 1h 58' 18"
31	Raymond Hoorelbeke (FRA)	Île-de-France	+ 2h 00' 46"
32	Jean Forestier (FRA)	France	+ 2h 09' 20"
33	Ugo Anzile (FRA)	North-East/Centre	+ 2h 10' 40"
34	Luciano Pezzi (ITA)	Italy	+ 2h 13' 30"
35	Jean Stablinski (FRA)	North-East/Centre	+ 2h 23' 47"
36	Daan de Groot (NED)	Netherlands	+ 2h 24' 58"
37	Günther Pankoke (FRG)	Luxembourg/Mixed	+ 2h 28' 15"
38	Jean Dacquay (FRA)	Île-de-France	+ 2h 28' 43"
39	Apo Lazaridès (FRA)	South-East	+ 2h 30' 52"
40	Danilo Barozzi (ITA)	Italy	+ 2h 31' 36"
41	Jos Hinsen (NED)	Netherlands	+ 2h 31' 16"
42	Rino Benedetti (ITA)	Italy	+ 2h 36' 25"
43	Georges Gay (FRA)	South West	+ 2h 36' 33"
44	Francis Siguenza (FRA)	Île-de-France	+ 2h 38' 46"
45	Lucien Teisseire (FRA)	South-East	+ 2h 41' 07"
46	Bernard Gauthier (FRA)	France	+ 2h 52' 43"
47	Jean-Marie Cieleska (FRA)	North-East/Centre	+ 2h 54' 29"
48	Hans Hollenstein (SUI)	Switzerland	+ 2h 55' 39"
49	André Darrigade (FRA)	France	+ 2h 57' 33"
50	Kurt Schneider (AUT)	Luxembourg/Mixed	+ 3h 02' 51"
51	Roger Buchonnet (FRA)	North-East/Centre	+ 3h 03' 06"
52	Philippe Agut (FRA)	South West	+ 3h 05' 57"
53	Jacky Bovay (SUI)	Switzerland	+ 3h 07' 41"
54	Louis Caput (FRA)	Île-de-France	+ 3h 07' 54"
55	Rik Van Steenbergen (BEL)	Belgium	+ 3h 10' 51"
56	Nicolas Barone (FRA)	Île-de-France	+ 3h 12' 24"
57	Gabriel Company (ESP)	Spain	+ 3h 18' 34"
58	Lucien Lazaridès (FRA)	South-East	+ 3h 22' 29"
59	René Genin (FRA)	South-East	+ 3h 39' 07"
60	Willy Kemp (LUX)	Luxembourg/Mixed	+ 3h 49' 23"
61	Max Schellenberg (SUI)	Switzerland	+ 3h 54' 11"
62	Pierre Ruby (FRA)	West	+ 4h 02' 52"
63	Max Cohen (FRA)	North-East/Centre	+ 4h 05' 40"
64	Russell Mockridge (AUS)	Luxembourg/Mixed	+ 4h 14' 46"
65	José Mateo (ESP)	Spain	+ 4h 26' 34"
66	Armand Di Caro (FRA)	South-East	+ 4h 32' 23"
67	Ernst Rudolf (SUI)	Switzerland	+ 4h 34' 05"
68	Henri Sitek (FRA)	West	+ 5h 06' 56"
69	Tony Hoar (GBR)	Great Britain	+ 6h 06' 01"

=== Points classification ===
Final points classification (1–10)
Rank	Rider	Team	Points
1	Stan Ockers (BEL)	Belgium	322
2	Wout Wagtmans (NED)	Netherlands	399
3	Miguel Poblet (ESP)	Spain	409
4	Wim van Est (NED)	Netherlands	415
5	Gilbert Bauvin (FRA)	North-East/Centre	483
6	Antonin Rolland (FRA)	France	503
7	Alfred De Bruyne (BEL)	Belgium	563
8	Alessandro Fantini (ITA)	Italy	573.5
9	Bruno Monti (ITA)	Italy	638.5
10	Raymond Impanis (BEL)	Belgium	652.5

=== Mountains classification ===
Final mountains classification (1–10)
Rank	Rider	Team	Points
1	Charly Gaul (LUX)	Luxembourg/Mixed	84
2	Louison Bobet (FRA)	France	70
3	Jean Brankart (BEL)	Belgium	44
4	Antonio Gelabert (ESP)	Spain	31
5	Giancarlo Astrua (ITA)	Italy	30
6	Jesús Loroño (ESP)	Spain	28
7	Jan Nolten (NED)	Netherlands	24
7	Pasquale Fornara (ITA)	Italy	24
9	Raphaël Géminiani (FRA)	France	23
10	Gilbert Scodeller (FRA)	North-East/Centre	18

=== Team classification ===
Final team classification
Rank	Team	Time
1	France	389h 10' 14"
2	Italy	+ 47' 33"
3	Belgium	+ 1h 54' 07"
4	Netherlands	+ 3h 11' 42"
5	North-East/Centre	+ 3h 46' 48"
6	Spain	+ 4h 35' 38"
7	South-East	+ 5h 57' 07"
8	West	+ 6h 06' 55"
9	Switzerland	+ 6h 45' 13"
10	Luxembourg/Mixed	+ 6h 49' 08"
11	Île-de-France	+ 7h 09' 08"

=== Combativity classification ===
Final combativity classification (1–10)
Rank	Rider	Team	Points
1	Charly Gaul (LUX)	Luxembourg/Mixed	256
2	Louison Bobet (FRA)	France	220
3	Roger Hassenforder (FRA)	North-East/Centre	114
4	Jean Brankart (BEL)	Belgium	112
5	Jean Stablinski (FRA)	North-East/Centre	107
6	Francisco Alomar (ESP)	Spain	106
7	Jan Nolten (NED)	Netherlands	96
8	Miguel Poblet (ESP)	Spain	75
9	Ferdinand Kübler (SUI)	Switzerland	74
9	Claude Le Ber (FRA)	West	74

== Bibliography ==
- Augendre, Jacques (2016). Guide historique [Historical guide] (PDF) (in French). Paris: Amaury Sport Organisation. Archived (PDF) from the original on 17 August 2016.
- Dimeo, Paul (2007). A History of Drug Use in Sport: 1876–1976: Beyond Good and Evil. London: Routledge. ISBN 978-0-415-35772-2.
- McGann, Bill; McGann, Carol (2006). The Story of the Tour de France: 1903–1964. Vol. 1. Indianapolis, IN: Dog Ear Publishing. ISBN 978-1-59858-180-5.
- Nauright, John; Parrish, Charles (2012). Sports Around the World: History, Culture, and Practice. Vol. 2. Santa Barbara, CA: ABC-CLIO. ISBN 978-1-59884-300-2.
- Seray, Jacques [in French]; Lablaine, Jacques (2006). Henri Desgrange, l'homme qui créa le Tour de France [Henri Desgrange, the man who created the Tour de France] (in French). Saint-Malo, France: Editions Cristel. ISBN 978-2-84421-042-5.
- van den Akker, Pieter (2018). Tour de France Rules and Statistics: 1903–2018. Self-published. ISBN 978-1-79398-080-9.
