= 1957 Giro d'Italia =

Race details
- Dates: 18 May - 9 June 1957
- Stages: 21
- Distance: 3,926.7 km (2,440 mi)
- Winning time: 104h 45' 06"

Results
Jersey awarded to the overall winner	Winner	Gastone Nencini (ITA)	(Chlorodont)
	Second	Louison Bobet (FRA)	(Velo Club Bustese)
	Third	Ercole Baldini (ITA)	(Legnano)
	Mountains	Raphaël Géminiani (FRA)	(Velo Club Bustese)
	Sprints	Rik Van Steenbergen (BEL)	(Cora-Elvé)
	Team	Legnano	

The 1957 Giro d'Italia was the 40th running of the Giro d'Italia, one of cycling's Grand Tour races. The Giro started in Milan, on 18 May, with a 191 km (118.7 mi) stage and concluded in Milan, on 9 June, with a 257 km (159.7 mi) leg. A total of 120 riders from 15 teams entered the 21-stage race, which was won by Italian Gastone Nencini of the Leo-Chlorodont team. The second and third places were taken by Frenchman Louison Bobet and Italian Ercole Baldini, respectively.

== Teams ==
Fifteen teams were invited by the race organizers to participate in the 1957 edition of the Giro d'Italia. The team size increased from seven to eight riders per team, which meant that the race started with a peloton of 120 cyclists. From the riders that began the race, 86 made it to the finish in Milan.

The Giro organisation invited five national teams (most of which for the duration of the Giro were sponsored by an Italian company) and ten Italian teams:

- Asborno
- Atala
- Bianchi
- Bif
- Bottecchia
- Carpano
- Chlorodont
- Cora (Belgium)
- Faema (International)
- Girardengo (the Netherlands)
- Ignis (Spain)
- Legnano
- San Pellegrino
- Torpado
- Velo Club Bustese (France)

The "international" team was a combined Swiss-Luxembourgish team.

== Pre-race favorites ==
Reigning champion Charly Gaul was seen as a favorite to repeat as winner.

== Route and stages ==
The route was revealed on 5 March 1957.

Stage characteristics and winners
Stage	Date	Course	Distance	Type	Winner
1	18 May	Milan to Verona	191 km (119 mi)	Plain stage	Rik Van Steenbergen (BEL)
2	19 May	Verona to Bosco Chiesanuova	28 km (17 mi)	Individual time trial	Charly Gaul (LUX)
3	20 May	Verona to Ferrara	169 km (105 mi)	Plain stage	Miguel Poblet (ESP)
4	21 May	Ferrara to Cattolica	190 km (118 mi)	Plain stage	André Vlayen (BEL)
5	22 May	Cattolica to Loreto	235 km (146 mi)	Plain stage	Alessandro Fantini (ITA)
6	23 May	Loreto to Terni	175 km (109 mi)	Stage with mountain(s)	Wout Wagtmans (NED)
7	24 May	Terni to Pescara	221 km (137 mi)	Stage with mountain(s)	Antonin Rolland (FRA)
8	25 May	Pescara to Naples	250 km (155 mi)	Stage with mountain(s)	Vito Favero (ITA)
9	26 May	Naples to Frascati	220 km (137 mi)	Plain stage	Miguel Poblet (ESP)
10	27 May	Rome to Siena	227 km (141 mi)	Stage with mountain(s)	Miguel Poblet (ESP)
11	28 May	Siena to Montecatini Terme	230 km (143 mi)	Plain stage	Rik Van Steenbergen (BEL)
	29 May	Rest day			
12	30 May	Montecatini to Forte dei Marmi	58 km (36 mi)	Individual time trial	Ercole Baldini (ITA)
13	31 May	Forte dei Marmi to Genoa	163 km (101 mi)	Stage with mountain(s)	Bruno Monti (ITA)
14	1 June	Genoa to Saint-Vincent	235 km (146 mi)	Plain stage	Mario Baroni (ITA)
15	2 June	Saint-Vincent to Sion (Switzerland)	134 km (83 mi)	Stage with mountain(s)	Louison Bobet (FRA)
16	3 June	Sion (Switzerland) to Campo dei Fiori	229 km (142 mi)	Stage with mountain(s)	Alfredo Sabbadin (ITA)
17a	4 June	Varese to Como	82 km (51 mi)	Plain stage	Alessandro Fantini (ITA)
17b	4 June	Como to Como	34 km (21 mi)	Plain stage	Rik Van Steenbergen (BEL)
	5 June	Rest day			
18	6 June	Como to Monte Bondone	242 km (150 mi)	Stage with mountain(s)	Miguel Poblet (ESP)
19	7 June	Trento to Levico Terme	199 km (124 mi)	Stage with mountain(s)	Charly Gaul (LUX)
20	8 June	Levico Terme to Abano Terme	157 km (98 mi)	Plain stage	Rik Van Steenbergen (BEL)
21	9 June	Abano Terme to Milan	257 km (160 mi)	Plain stage	Rik Van Steenbergen (BEL)
	Total		3,926.7 km (2,440 mi)		

== Classification leadership ==
One jersey was worn during the 1957 Giro d'Italia. The leader of the general classification – calculated by adding the stage finish times of each rider – wore a pink jersey. This classification is the most important of the race, and its winner is considered as the winner of the Giro. There were no time bonuses in 1957.

A secondary classification was the mountains classification. For the first time in Giro history, the climbs were ranked in first and second categories. In this ranking, points were won by reaching the summit of a climb ahead of other cyclists. There were two categories of mountains. The first category awarded 10, 7, 5, 3, and 1 points, while the second distributed 5, 3, and 1 points.

There was an intermediate sprints classification. The first three riders at each intermediate sprint received points, 5 for the winner down to 1 for the third.

Also present was the piste classification, in Italian known as Trofeo de Velodromos, a rebranding of 1956's Trofeo della plata. There were eight stages that ended on a velodrome, and the first three riders on those stages received points (5 for the winner, down to 1 for the third).

There was also one classification for the teams, based on stage positions: the stage positions of the three best riders per team were added, and the team with the lowest total rank was the best team. There was no jersey for this classifications.

Classification leadership by stage
Stage	Winner	General classification	Mountains classification	Intermediate sprints classification	Piste classification	Team classification
1	Rik Van Steenbergen	Rik Van Steenbergen	not awarded	Cleto Maule	not awarded	Cora
2	Charly Gaul	Louison Bobet	Charly Gaul	Cleto Maule	not awarded	Velo Club Bustese
3	Miguel Poblet	Louison Bobet	Charly Gaul	Rik Van Steenbergen	Miguel Poblet	Velo Club Bustese
4	André Vlayen	Louison Bobet	Charly Gaul	Rik Van Steenbergen	Miguel Poblet	Bottecchia
5	Alessandro Fantini	Louison Bobet	Charly Gaul	Pierino Baffi	Miguel Poblet	Bottecchia
6	Wout Wagtmans	Louison Bobet	Charly Gaul	Pierino Baffi	Miguel Poblet	Bottecchia
7	Antonin Rolland	Louison Bobet	Raphaël Géminiani	Pierino Baffi	Miguel Poblet	Bottecchia
8	Vito Favero	Nino Defilippis	Raphaël Géminiani	Rik Van Steenbergen	multiple riders	Bottecchia
9	Miguel Poblet	Nino Defilippis	Raphaël Géminiani	Rik Van Steenbergen	multiple riders	Bottecchia
10	Miguel Poblet	Nino Defilippis	Raphaël Géminiani	Rik Van Steenbergen	Miguel Poblet	Bottecchia
11	Rik Van Steenbergen	Nino Defilippis	Raphaël Géminiani	Rik Van Steenbergen	Miguel Poblet	Legnano
12	Bruno Monti	Louison Bobet	Raphaël Géminiani	Rik Van Steenbergen	Miguel Poblet	Legnano
13	Ercole Baldini	Louison Bobet	Raphaël Géminiani	Rik Van Steenbergen	Miguel Poblet	Legnano
14	Mario Baroni	Antonin Rolland	Raphaël Géminiani	Rik Van Steenbergen	Miguel Poblet	Legnano
15	Louison Bobet	Louison Bobet	Raphaël Géminiani	Rik Van Steenbergen	Miguel Poblet	Legnano
16	Alfredo Sabbadin	Charly Gaul	Raphaël Géminiani	Rik Van Steenbergen	Miguel Poblet	Legnano
17a	Alessandro Fantini	Charly Gaul	Raphaël Géminiani	Rik Van Steenbergen	Miguel Poblet	Legnano
17b	Rik Van Steenbergen	Charly Gaul	Raphaël Géminiani	Rik Van Steenbergen	Miguel Poblet	Legnano
18	Miguel Poblet	Gastone Nencini	Raphaël Géminiani	Rik Van Steenbergen	Miguel Poblet	Legnano
19	Charly Gaul	Gastone Nencini	Raphaël Géminiani	Rik Van Steenbergen	Miguel Poblet	Legnano
20	Rik Van Steenbergen	Gastone Nencini	Raphaël Géminiani	Rik Van Steenbergen	Miguel Poblet	Legnano
21	Rik Van Steenbergen	Gastone Nencini	Raphaël Géminiani	Rik Van Steenbergen	Miguel Poblet	Legnano
Final		Gastone Nencini	Raphaël Géminiani	Rik Van Steenbergen	Miguel Poblet	Legnano

== Final standings ==
Legend
Pink jersey	Denotes the winner of the General classification

=== General classification ===
Final general classification (1–10)
Rank	Name	Team	Time
1	Gastone Nencini (ITA)	Chlorodont	104h 45' 06"
2	Louison Bobet (FRA)	Velo Club Bustese	+ 19"
3	Ercole Baldini (ITA)	Legnano	+ 5' 59"
4	Charly Gaul (LUX)	Faema-Guerra	+ 7' 31"
5	Raphaël Géminiani (FRA)	Velo Club Bustese	+ 17' 28"
6	Miguel Poblet (ESP)	Ignis-Doniselli	+ 19' 49"
7	Raymond Impanis (BEL)	Cora-Elvé	+ 21' 06"
8	Pasquale Fornara (ITA)	Bif-Clement	+ 24' 16"
9	Wout Wagtmans (NED)	ERG-Girardengo	+ 24' 29"
10	Antonin Rolland (FRA)	Velo Club Bustese	+ 27' 29"

=== Mountains classification ===
Final mountains classification (1–10)
	Name	Team	Points
1	Raphaël Géminiani (FRA)	Velo Club Bustese	56
2	Charly Gaul (LUX)	Faema-Guerra	38
3	Louison Bobet (FRA)	Velo Club Bustese	36
4	Miguel Poblet (ESP)	Ignis-Doniselli	25
5	Gastone Nencini (ITA)	Chlorodont	20
6	Ercole Baldini (ITA)	Legnano	19
7	Guido Carlesi (ITA)	Bottecchia-Gripo	13
8	Emilio Bottecchia (ESP)	Bottecchia-Gripo	10
8	Alfredo Sabbadin (ITA)	San Pellegrino	10
10	Antonin Rolland (FRA)	Velo Club Bustese	7

=== Intermediate sprints classification ===
Final intermediate sprints classification (1–10)
	Name	Team	Points
1	Rik Van Steenbergen (BEL)	Cora-Elvé	36
2	Guido Carlesi (ITA)	Bottecchia-Gripo	21
3	Emilio Bottecchia (ESP)	Bottecchia-Gripo	18
4	Pierino Baffi (ITA)	Bif	15
5	Mario Tosato (ITA)	Torpado	13
5	Arrigo Padovan (ITA)	Atala	13
7	Miguel Poblet (ESP)	Ignis-Doniselli	11
7	Cleto Maule (ITA)	Torpado	11
7	Armando Pellegrini (ITA)	Faema	11
10	Alessandro Fantini (ITA)	Atala	8
10	Raphaël Géminiani (FRA)	Velo Club Bustese	8

=== Trofeo de Velodromos classification ===
Final trofeo de velodromos classification (1–10)
	Name	Team	Points
1	Miguel Poblet (ESP)	Ignis-Doniselli	17
2	Rik Van Steenbergen (BEL)	Cora-Elvé	13
3	Vito Favero (ITA)	Bianchi	6
4	Wout Wagtmans (NED)	ERG-Girardengo	5
4	Antonin Rolland (FRA)	Velo Club Bustese	5
4	Bruno Monti (ITA)	Bianchi	5
7	Alessandro Fantini (ITA)	Atala	4
8	Ugo Massocco (ITA)	Legnano	3
8	Arrigo Padovan (ITA)	Atala	3
10	Nino Defilippis (NED)	Bianchi	1
10	Nello Fabbri (ITA)	Legnano	1
10	Edgard Sorgeloos (BEL)	Cora-Elvé	1
10	Cleto Maule (ITA)	Torpado	1

=== Team classification ===
Final team classification (1–10)
	Team	Points
1	Legnano	953
2	Atala	1132
3	Velo Club Bustese (France)	1161
4	Girardengo (the Netherlands)	1178
5	Botecchia	1180
6	Faema (International)	1216
7	Torpado	1270
8	Cora (Belgium)	1283
9	Bif	1476
10	Chlorodont	1483
