= 1956 Tour de Romandie =

Race details
- Dates: 10–13 May 1956
- Stages: 4
- Distance: 819 km (509 mi)
- Winning time: 21h 52' 18"

Results
| | Winner | Pasquale Fornara (ITA) |
| | Second | Carlo Clerici (SUI) |
| | Third | René Strehler (SUI) |

The 1956 Tour de Romandie was the tenth edition of the Tour de Romandie cycle race and was held from 10 May to 13 May 1956. The race started and finished in Geneva. The race was won by Pasquale Fornara.

== General classification ==
Final general classification
| Rank | Rider | Time |
|---|---|---|
| 1 | Pasquale Fornara (ITA) | 21h 52' 18" |
| 2 | Carlo Clerici (SUI) | + 54" |
| 3 | René Strehler (SUI) | + 1' 11" |
| 4 | Bruno Monti (ITA) | + 1' 16" |
| 5 | Adolfo Grosso (ITA) | + 3' 16" |
| 6 | Ugo Anzile (FRA) | + 3' 17" |
| 7 | Pietro Giudici (ITA) | + 4' 23" |
| 8 | Alessandro Fantini (ITA) | + 4' 27" |
| 9 | Raymond Reisser (FRA) | + 6' 11" |
| 10 | Hans Hollenstein (SUI) | + 6' 12" |
