= 1956 Giro d'Italia =

Race details
- Dates: 19 May - 10 June 1956
- Stages: 22, including one split stage
- Distance: 3,523.45 km (2,189 mi)
- Winning time: 101h 39' 46"

Results
Jersey awarded to the overall winner	Winner	Charly Gaul (LUX)	(Faema)
	Second	Fiorenzo Magni (ITA)	(Nivea-Fuchs)
	Third	Agostino Coletto (ITA)	(Fréjus)
	Mountains	Three riders (Note: There were three mountains classifications in the 1956 Giro d'Italia, one for the Dolomites, Apennines, and one for the highest mountain in the race, the Passo dello Stelvio. The rider that was the first over the Stelvio was Aurelio Del Rio. Federico Bahamontes won the Trofeo Appennini, while Charly Gaul won the Trofeo Dolomiti.)	
	Sprints	Giorgio Albani (ITA)	(Legnano)
	Team	Atala	

The 1956 Giro d'Italia was the 39th edition of the Giro d'Italia, one of cycling's Grand Tours. The Giro started off in Milan on 19 May with a 210 km (130.5 mi) flat stage and concluded back in Milan with a 113 km (70.2 mi) relatively flat mass-start stage on 10 June. Sixteen teams entered the race, which was won by Luxembourgian Charly Gaul of the Faema team. Second and third respectively were Italian riders Fiorenzo Magni and Agostino Coletto.

Gaul took the lead in the legendary stage up Monte Bondone, where under a snow storm he won with an 8-minute margin over runner up Alessandro Fantini. This edition is unique since there were two Mountains Classification winners. There were two awards for the Dolomites and the Apennine mountains, the winners were Charly Gaul and Federico Bahamontes respectively.

== Teams ==
Fifteen teams were invited by the race organizers to participate in the 1956 edition of the Giro d'Italia. Each team sent a squad of seven riders, which meant that the race started with a peloton of 105 cyclists. From the riders that began the race, 43 made it to the finish in Milan.

The Giro organisation invited five national teams (most of which for the duration of the Giro were sponsored by an Italian company) and ten Italian teams:

- Arbos-Bif-Clément
- Atala-Pirelli
- Bianchi-Pirelli
- Carpano-Coppi
- Eldorado (Belgium)
- Faema-Guerra (International)
- Francia
- Fréjus-Superga
- Girardengo-ICEP (Spain)
- Italcover (the Netherlands)
- Ignis
- Legnano
- Leo-Chlorodont
- Nivea-Fuchs
- Torpado-Pirelli

The "international" team was a combined Swiss-Luxembourgish team.

== Pre-race favorites ==
The race was thought to be more open in previous years due to notable absences of top riders like Louison Bobet due to sickness, 1950 winner Hugo Koblet as he was recovering from a back injury and desired to focus on the Tour de France, Stan Ockers, Ferdinand Kübler, and Raphaël Géminiani, along with the innovations regarding the race route. A Feuille d'Avis de Neuchatel writer felt that the race would offer a great opportunity for the younger riders to succeed as the previous great riders like Coppi are getting too old. Previous year's winner Fiorenzo Magni (Nivea-Fuchs) was one of the older generation of riders to enter the race in great form, coming off of a win at the Tour of Piedmont. In addition, Magni had announced that this would be his last Giro as he would retire as the season's end. The writer continued naming young Italians with potential to contend like Gastone Nencini (Leo–Chlorodont), following his performance in last Giro, amateur road race champion Sante Ranucci (Legnano), and Aldo Moser (Torpado). Jean Brankart lead the primarily Belgian Eldorado team and was viewed as a rider who would win a Tour de France. Some viewed Charly Gaul (Faema) as a favorite to contend for the overall. Spanish contenders were thought to be climber Federico Bahamontes (Girardengo), while sprinter Miguel Poblet (Faema) was thought to be a favorite for the flatter stages.

== Route and stages ==
The route was revealed on 24 February 1956. The race contained eight stages with mountains, which contained sixteen categorized climbs. The race route all together contained 3 rest days and 23 stages across 25 days of racing, of which 18 were mass-start stages, two individual time trials, one team time trial event, and one individual time trial run as a relay. The relay event took place in San Marino. The second day of racing featured a split stage where the second half was a team time trial that was contested at night to not interfere with a local football match that was happening in the afternoon. The planned tenth stage from Salerno to Frascati was deemed an "electoral stage" at the route's announcement and was chosen to be removed because it fell on the day of Italian local elections.Three new Dolomite mountains were climbed during this edition of the race: Monte Bondone (1,300 m (4,265 ft)), San-Pellegrino (1,918 m (6,293 ft)), and Vallès (2,033 m (6,670 ft) meters). Eleven categorized climbs from the Apennines were included in the race route, with the Pian di Creto (605 m (1,985 ft)) being utilized in the second stage. For the first time in race history, the cities of Lecco, Rapallo, Salice Terme were stops for the Giro.

When interviewed about the route several current and former riders said that the route was thought to be difficult.

Stage characteristics and winners
Stage	Date	Course	Distance	Type	Winner
1	19 May	Milan to Alessandria	210 km (130 mi)	Plain stage	Pierino Baffi (ITA)
2a	20 May	Alessandria to Genoa	96 km (60 mi)	Stage with mountain(s)	Alessandro Fantini (ITA)
2b	20 May	Circuito di Lido d'Albaro	12 km (7 mi)	Team time trial	Leo-Chlorodont
3	21 May	Genoa to Salice Terme	152 km (94 mi)	Stage with mountain(s)	Alessandro Fantini (ITA)
4	22 May	Voghera to Mantua	198 km (123 mi)	Plain stage	Miguel Poblet (ESP)
5	23 May	Mantua to Rimini	228 km (142 mi)	Plain stage	Giuseppe Minardi (ITA)
6	23 May	San Marino	13 km (8 mi)	Individual time trial	Jan Nolten (NED)
7	24 May	Rimini to Pescara	245 km (152 mi)	Plain stage	Arrigo Padovan (ITA)
8	25 May	Pescara to Campobasso	205 km (127 mi)	Stage with mountain(s)	Charly Gaul (LUX)
9	26 May	Campobasso to Salerno	156 km (97 mi)	Plain stage	Miguel Poblet (ESP)
10	27 May	Salerno to Frascati	280 km (174 mi)	Plain stage	Stage Cancelled (Note: This stage was removed and the day was used to transfer the riders to Rome.)
11	28 May	Rome to Grosseto	198 km (123 mi)	Plain stage	Bruno Tognaccini (ITA)
12	29 May	Grosseto to Livorno	230 km (143 mi)	Plain stage	Pietro Nascimbene (ITA)
	30 May	Rest day			
13	31 May	Livorno to Lucca	54 km (34 mi)	Individual time trial	Pasquale Fornara (ITA)
14	1 June	Lucca to Bologna	168 km (104 mi)	Stage with mountain(s)	Michel Stolker (NED)
15	2 June	Bologna to Madonna di San Luca	2.45 km (2 mi)	Individual time trial	Charly Gaul (LUX)
16	3 June	Bologna to Rapallo	271 km (168 mi)	Stage with mountain(s)	Miguel Poblet (ESP)
17	4 June	Rapallo to Lecco	278 km (173 mi)	Stage with mountain(s)	Giorgio Albani (ITA)
18	5 June	Lecco to Sondrio	98 km (61 mi)	Plain stage	Miguel Poblet (ESP)
	6 June	Rest day			
19	7 June	Sondrio to Merano	163 km (101 mi)	Stage with mountain(s)	Cleto Maule (ITA)
20	8 June	Merano to Monte Bondone	242 km (150 mi)	Stage with mountain(s)	Charly Gaul (LUX)
21	9 June	Trento to San Pellegrino Terme	191 km (119 mi)	Plain stage	Giorgio Albani (ITA)
22	10 June	San Pellegrino Terme to Milan	113 km (70 mi)	Plain stage	Donato Piazza (ITA)
	Total		3,523.45 km (2,189 mi)		

== Classification leadership ==
One jersey was worn during the 1956 Giro d'Italia. The leader of the general classification – calculated by adding the stage finish times of each rider – wore a pink jersey. This classification is the most important of the race, and its winner is considered as the winner of the Giro.

There were three mountains classifications in the 1956 Giro d'Italia, one for the Dolomites, Apennines, and one for the highest mountain in the race, the Passo dello Stelvio. The rider that was the first over the Stelvio was Ignis' Aurelio Del Rio. In all mountains classifications, points were earned by the first five riders over a mountain.

There was an intermediate sprints classification. Unlike in the years before, points could only be scored at intermediate sprints, and no longer at the finish. The first three riders at each intermediate sprint received points, 5 for the winner down to 1 for the third.

Newly introduced was the piste classification, in Italian known as Trofeo della plata. There were seven stages that ended on a velodrome, and the first five riders on those stages received points (5 for the winner, down to 1 for the fifth).

There was also one classification for the teams, based on stage positions: the stage positions of the three best riders per team were added, and the team with the lowest total rank was the best team. There was no jersey for this classifications.

There was also a time trial award in 1956, calculated by adding the times of each time trial, this was won by Pasquale Fornara.

Classification leadership by stage
Stage	Winner	General classification	Trofeo Dolomiti	Trofeo Appennini	Intermediate sprints classification	Piste classification	Team classification
1	Pierino Baffi	Pierino Baffi	not awarded	not awarded	Mario Baroni	not awarded	Nivea-Fuchs
2a	Alessandro Fantini	Pierino Baffi	not awarded	Giuseppe Fallarini	Miguel Poblet	not awarded	Legnano
2b	Leo-Chlorodont	Vincenzo Zucconelli	not awarded	Giuseppe Fallarini	Miguel Poblet	not awarded	Legnano
3	Alessandro Fantini	Alessandro Fantini	not awarded	Federico Bahamontes	Miguel Poblet	not awarded	Atala
4	Miguel Poblet	Alessandro Fantini	not awarded	Federico Bahamontes	Miguel Poblet	Miguel Poblet	Atala
5	Giuseppe Minardi	Alessandro Fantini	not awarded	Federico Bahamontes	Miguel Poblet	Miguel Poblet & Giuseppe Minardi	Atala
6	Jan Nolten	Alessandro Fantini	not awarded	Federico Bahamontes	Miguel Poblet	Miguel Poblet & Giuseppe Minardi	Atala & Legnano
7	Arrigo Padovan	Alessandro Fantini	not awarded	Federico Bahamontes	Miguel Poblet	Miguel Poblet & Giuseppe Minardi	Atala
8	Charly Gaul	Alessandro Fantini	not awarded	Federico Bahamontes	Miguel Poblet	Miguel Poblet & Giuseppe Minardi	Legnano
9	Miguel Poblet	Alessandro Fantini	not awarded	Federico Bahamontes	Miguel Poblet	Miguel Poblet & Giuseppe Minardi	Legnano
10	Stage Cancelled	Alessandro Fantini	not awarded	Federico Bahamontes	Miguel Poblet	Miguel Poblet & Giuseppe Minardi	Legnano
11	Bruno Tognaccini	Alessandro Fantini	not awarded	Federico Bahamontes	Miguel Poblet	Miguel Poblet & Giuseppe Minardi	Legnano
12	Pietro Nascimbene	Alessandro Fantini	not awarded	Federico Bahamontes	Miguel Poblet	Miguel Poblet & Giuseppe Minardi	Legnano
13	Pasquale Fornara	Pasquale Fornara	not awarded	Federico Bahamontes	Miguel Poblet	Miguel Poblet & Giuseppe Minardi	Legnano
14	Michel Stolker	Pasquale Fornara	not awarded	Federico Bahamontes	Miguel Poblet	Giorgio Albani	Legnano
15	Charly Gaul	Pasquale Fornara	not awarded	Federico Bahamontes	Miguel Poblet	Giorgio Albani	Legnano
16	Miguel Poblet	Pasquale Fornara	not awarded	Federico Bahamontes	Miguel Poblet	Giorgio Albani	Legnano
17	Giorgio Albani	Pasquale Fornara	not awarded	Federico Bahamontes	Miguel Poblet	Giorgio Albani	Legnano
18	Miguel Poblet	Pasquale Fornara	not awarded	Federico Bahamontes	Miguel Poblet	Giorgio Albani	Legnano
19	Cleto Maule	Pasquale Fornara	not awarded	Federico Bahamontes	Miguel Poblet	Giorgio Albani	Legnano
20	Charly Gaul	Charly Gaul	Charly Gaul	Federico Bahamontes	Giorgio Albani	Giorgio Albani	Atala
21	Giorgio Albani	Charly Gaul	Charly Gaul	Federico Bahamontes	Giorgio Albani	Giorgio Albani	Atala
22	Donato Piazza	Charly Gaul	Charly Gaul	Federico Bahamontes	Giorgio Albani	Giorgio Albani	Atala
Final		Charly Gaul	Charly Gaul	Federico Bahamontes	Giorgio Albani	Giorgio Albani	Atala

== Final standings ==
Legend
Pink jersey	Denotes the winner of the General classification

=== General classification ===
Final general classification (1–10)
Rank	Name	Team	Time
1	Charly Gaul (LUX)	Faema-Guerra	101h 39' 49"
2	Fiorenzo Magni (ITA)	Nivea-Fuchs	+ 3' 27"
3	Agostino Coletto (ITA)	Fréjus	+ 6' 53"
4	Cleto Maule (ITA)	Torpado	+ 7' 25"
5	Aldo Moser (ITA)	Torpado	+ 7' 30"
6	Alessandro Fantini (ITA)	Atala-Pirelli	+ 8' 46"
7	Jean Brankart (BEL)	Eldroado	+ 9' 21"
8	Bruno Monti (ITA)	Atala-Pirelli	+ 10' 54"
9	Waldemaro Bartolozzi (ITA)	Legnano	+ 18' 14"
10	Hilaire Couvreur (BEL)	Eldorado	+ 18' 41"

=== Trofeo Dolomiti ===
Final mountains classification (1-7)
	Name	Team	Points
1	Charly Gaul (LUX)	Faema-Guerra	20
2	Bruno Monti (ITA)	Atala-Pirelli	5
3	Arrigo Padovan (ITA)	Atala-Pirelli	4
3	Alessandro Fantini (ITA)	Atala-Pirelli	4
3	Agostino Coletto (ITA)	Fréjus	4
6	Fiorenzo Magni (ITA)	Nivea-Fuchs	8
7	Pierino Baffi (ITA)	Nivea-Fuchs	8

=== Trofeo Appennini ===
Final mountains classification (1–5)
	Name	Team	Points
1	Federico Bahamontes (ESP)	Girardengo	30
2	Bruno Monti (ITA)	Atala-Pirelli	13
3	Giuseppe Buratti (ITA)	Bianchi	11
4	Pasquale Fornara (ITA)	Arbos	10
5	Aldo Moser (ITA)	Torpado	8

=== Intermediate sprints classification ===
Final intermediate sprints classification (1–6)
	Name	Team	Points
1	Giorgio Albani (ITA)	Legnano	22
2	Giuseppe Favero (ITA)	Bianchi	11
3	Mies Stolker (NED)	Italcover	10
4	Guido De Santi (ITA)	Ignis	8
4	Mario Baroni (ITA)	Nivea-Fuchs	8
6	Gino Guerrini (ITA)	Carpano-Coppi	7
6	Alessandro Fantini (ITA)	Atala-Pirelli	7

=== Trofeo della plata ===
Final Trofeo della plata classification (1–4)
	Name	Team	Points
1	Giorgio Albani (ITA)	Legnano	8
2	Bruno Monti (ITA)	Atala-Pirelli	6
2	Guido De Santi (ITA)	Ignis	6
4	Arrigo Padovan (ITA)	Atala-Pirelli	5
4	Bruno Tognaccini (ITA)	Leo-Chlorodont	5
4	Pietro Nascimbene (ITA)	Carpano-Coppi	5
4	Mies Stolker (NED)	Italcover	5
4	Cleto Maule (ITA)	Torpado	5
4	Donato Piazza (ITA)	Nivea-Fuchs	5

=== Team classification ===
Final team classification (1–6)
	Team	Points
1	Atala-Pirelli	1014
2	Torpado	1054
3	Nivea-Fuchs	1200
4	Carpano-Coppi	1545
5	Leo-Chlorodont	1619
6	Ignis	1627
