= Giorgio Albani =

Italian cyclist

Personal information
- Born: 15 June 1929 Monza, Italy
- Died: 29 July 2015 (aged 86)

Cycling career
- Sport: Cycling
- Discipline: Road
- Role: Rider

Professional teams
- 1950–1958: Legnano–Pirelli
- 1959: Molteni

Major wins
- Grand Tours Giro d'Italia 7 stages One-day races and Classics Coppa Ugo Agostoni (1950) Italian National Road Race Championships (1956)

Giorgio Albani (born 15 June 1929 – 29 July 2015) was an Italian racing cyclist. He rode in ten editions of the Giro d'Italia, and won seven stages.

== Major results ==
1949
3rd Coppa Ugo Agostoni
1950
1st Coppa Ugo Agostoni
1st Stage 1 Giro di Sicilia
2nd Giro della Romagna
3rd Trofeo Baracchi
1951
1st Milano-Modena
2nd Milano–Torino
2nd Giro dell'Emilia
1952
1st Giro del Piemonte
1st Giro dell'Appennino
10th Overall Giro d'Italia

1st Stages 1 & 7

1953
1st Giro del Lazio
1st Stage 1b Roma-Napoli-Roma
1st Stage 11 Giro d'Italia
1st Coppa Bernocchi
1954
1st Stage 7 Giro d'Italia
1st Giro dell'Appennino
1st Stage 1b Roma-Napoli-Roma
1st Tre Valli Varesine
6th Giro di Lombardia
1955
1st Stage 13 Giro d'Italia
3rd Milan-Turin
1956
1st Stages 16 & 20 Giro d'Italia
1st Giro del Veneto
1st National Road Race Championships
2nd Gran Premio Industria e Commercio di Prato
2nd Tre Valli Varesine
3rd Trofeo Baracchi
1957
1st Giro di Campania
3rd National Road Race Championships
3rd Giro di Toscana
1959
5th Tre Valli Varesine
