= 1958 Tour de Suisse =

Race details
- Dates: 11–18 June 1958
- Stages: 8
- Distance: 1,511 km (938.9 mi)
- Winning time: 40h 39' 41"

Results
	Winner	Pasquale Fornara (ITA)
	Second	Hans Junkermann (FRG)
	Third	Antonino Catalano (ITA)

The 1958 Tour de Suisse was the 22nd edition of the Tour de Suisse cycle race and was held from 11 June to 18 June 1958. The race started and finished in Zürich. The race was won by Pasquale Fornara.

== General classification ==
Final general classification

Rank	Rider	Time
1	Pasquale Fornara (ITA)	40h 39' 41"
2	Hans Junkermann (FRG)	+ 7' 06"
3	Antonino Catalano (ITA)	+ 8' 55"
4	Nino Defilippis (ITA)	+ 9' 23"
5	Désiré Keteleer (BEL)	+ 14' 38"
6	Marcel Janssens (BEL)	+ 19' 08"
7	Kurt Gimmi (SUI)	+ 25' 26"
8	Giorgio Menini (ITA)	+ 36' 07"
9	Adriano De Gasperi (SUI)	+ 38' 20"
10	Ernst Traxel (SUI)	+ 38' 39"
