= Max Cohen (cyclist) =

French cyclist

Personal information
- Born: 23 April 1932 Clermont-Ferrand, France
- Died: 21 December 2002 (aged 70) Ussel-d'Allier, France

Cycling career
- Sport: Cycling
- Role: Rider

Max Cohen (23 April 1932 – 21 December 2002) was a French racing cyclist. He rode in the 1955 Tour de France.
