= Alfredo Sabbadin =

Italian cyclist

Personal information
- Born: 20 January 1936 Santa Maria di Sala, Italy
- Died: 26 March 2016 (aged 80) Noale, Italy

Cycling career
- Sport: Cycling
- Role: Rider

Alfredo Sabbadin (20 January 1936 – 26 March 2016) was an Italian professional racing cyclist. He rode in two editions of the Tour de France. In 1955 he won Coppa Città di San Daniele.
