= Jos Hinsen =

Dutch cyclist

Personal information
- Full name: Jos Hinsen
- Born: 14 April 1931 Rijkevorsel, Belgium
- Died: 15 March 2009 (aged 77) Turnhout, Belgium

Cycling career
- Sport: Cycling
- Discipline: Road
- Role: Rider

Major wins
- 1 stage 1955 Tour de France

Jos Hinsen (14 April 1931 in Rijkevorsel, Belgium – 15 March 2009 in Turnhout, Belgium) was a Dutch professional road bicycle racer.

== Major results ==
1955
Tour de France:

Winner stage 7

1958
Rijkevorsel
