= Henri Sitek =

Polish-French cyclist

Personal information
- Born: 11 July 1929 Krzyworzeka, Poland
- Died: 24 December 2011 (aged 82) Albi, France

Cycling career
- Sport: Cycling
- Role: Rider

Henri Sitek (11 July 1929 – 24 December 2011) was a Polish-French professional racing cyclist. He rode in the 1955 Tour de France.
