= Jacky Bovay =

Swiss cyclist

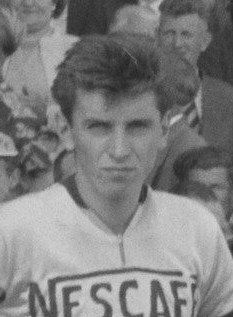
- Jacky Bovay (1956)

Personal information
- Born: 1 April 1933 Treycovagnes, Switzerland
- Died: 19 September 1984 (aged 51) Yverdon-les-Bains, Switzerland

Cycling career
- Sport: Cycling
- Role: Rider

Jacky Bovay (1 April 1933 – 19 September 1984) was a Swiss professional racing cyclist. He rode in two editions of the Tour de France.
