= Wout Wagtmans =

Dutch cyclist

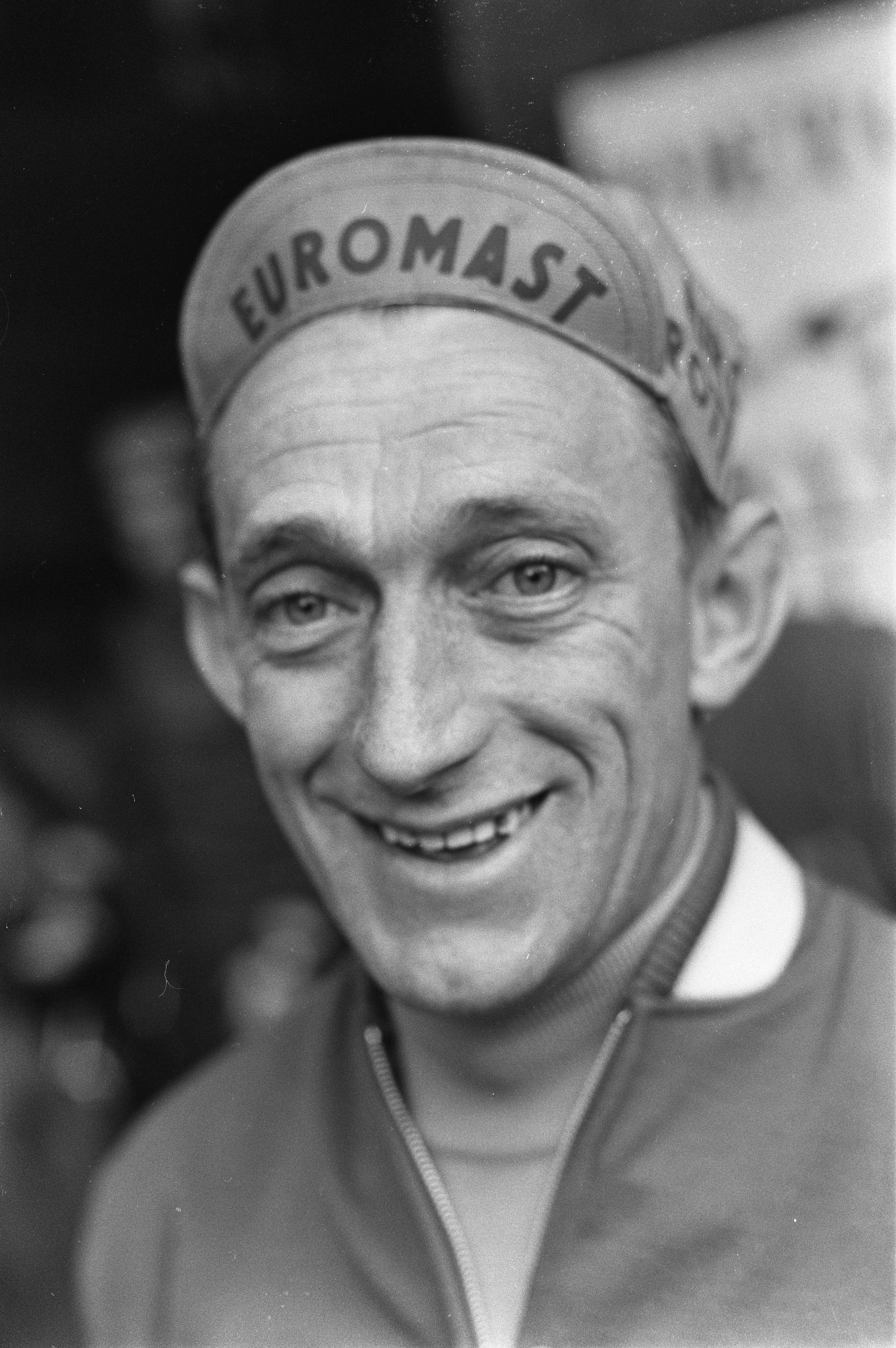
- Wout Wagtmans in 1967

Personal information
- Full name: Wouter Wagtmans
- Nickname: Olijke Woutje (Jolly Woutje)
- Born: 10 November 1929 Rucphen, the Netherlands
- Died: 15 August 1994 (aged 64) Sint Willebrord, Netherlands

Cycling career
- Sport: Cycling
- Discipline: Road
- Role: Rider
- Rider type: Sprinter

Professional teams
- 1950–1953: Garin
- 1954–1959: Vredestein
- 1960: Molteni
- 1961: Vredestein

Major wins
- Grand Tours Tour de France 4 individual stages (1953, 1954, 1955) Giro d'Italia 3 individual stages (1954, 1957)

Wouter "Wout" Wagtmans (10 November 1929 – 15 August 1994) was a Dutch road bicycle racer.

Together with Wim van Est he belonged to the generation that brought great popularity to cycling in the Netherlands in the 1950s. In 1947, Wagtmans started as amateur, and two years later he became Dutch champion. In 1950 he was forced to be a professional cyclist, because he was said to take money after a victory. In his first day as a professional cyclist, he entered the Dutch professional championship, and only Gerrit Schulte could keep ahead of him.

After that, he had a glorious career. He entered the Tour de France eight times, and wore the yellow jersey in 1954, 1955 and 1956. He won four stages: in 1953 in Gap he beat Gino Bartali in the final sprint, and ended fifth in the overall standings. Two years later he was the third Dutch winner in Bordeaux. He also won three stages in the Giro d'Italia and several one-day races. He was also successful as a track rider and, together with Wim van Est, in two-up time trials.

Wout Wagtmans was a very popular cyclist, both because of his combativity and his enthusiasm. He received many nicknames, Olijke Woutje, Dik Trom, Zoeloe, de Clown and het Kemphaantje. He ended his cycling career in 1961, and in 1967 he was the leader of the Dutch Tour de France team, centered on Jan Janssen. After that he took over his father's transport company. At the end of the 1980s, he had a serious accident after which he was declared physically disabled. Wagtmans died in 1994, at the age of 64.

Wout Wagtmans was the uncle of another successful cyclist, Rini Wagtmans.

== Major results ==
1949
Netherlands amateur road race champion
1950
Acht van Chaam
Oosterhout
Rotterdam
Ronde van Noord-Holland
Halsteren
1951
Leopoldsbrug
Terneuzen
Wouw
Oostbrug
1952
Acht van Chaam
Tour de Romandie
1953
Ronde van Haspengouw
Tour de France:

Winner stages 17 and 21
5th place overall classification

Paris–Roubaix

3rd place overall

Hoensbroek
1954
Helmond
Sint-Willebrord
Giro d'Italia:

Winner stages 13 and 19

Tour de France:

Winner stage 1
Wearing yellow jersey for seven days

1955
Drachten
Apeldoorn
Giro d'Italia:

9th place overall classification

Tour de France:

Winner stage 19
Wearing yellow jersey for two days

1956
Tour de France:

Wearing yellow jersey for three days

1957
Roma – Napoli – Roma
Giro d'Italia:

Winner stage 6
9th place overall classification

1960
Tour des Quatre-Cantons

== See also ==
- List of Dutch cyclists who have led the Tour de France general classification
