= Hans Hollenstein =

Swiss cyclist (born 1929)

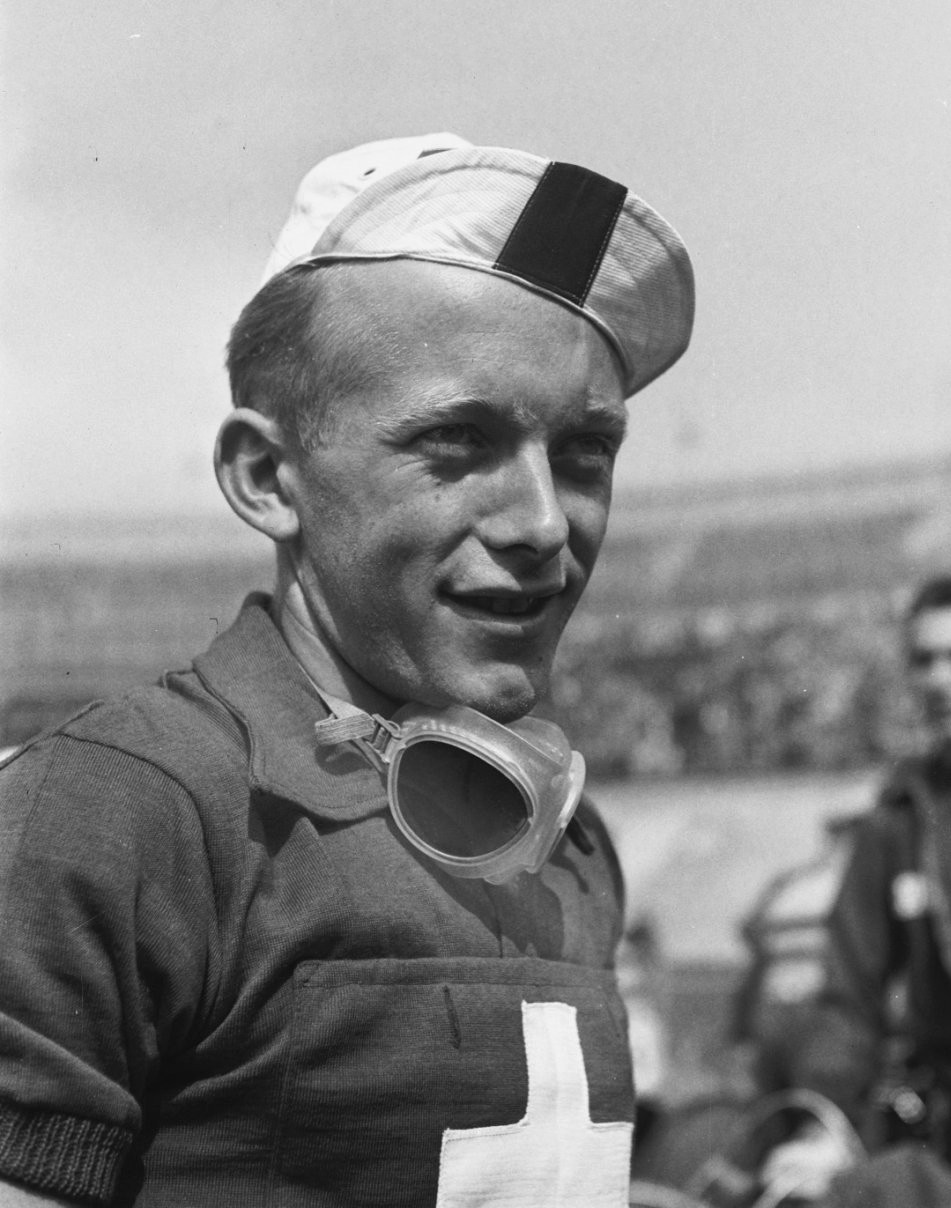

Personal information
- Born: 1 April 1929 (age 97) Zürich, Switzerland

Cycling career
- Sport: Cycling
- Role: Rider

Hans Hollenstein (born 1 April 1929) is a Swiss former racing cyclist. He was the Swiss National Road Race champion in 1957.
