= Jean Brankart =

Belgian cyclist (1930–2020)

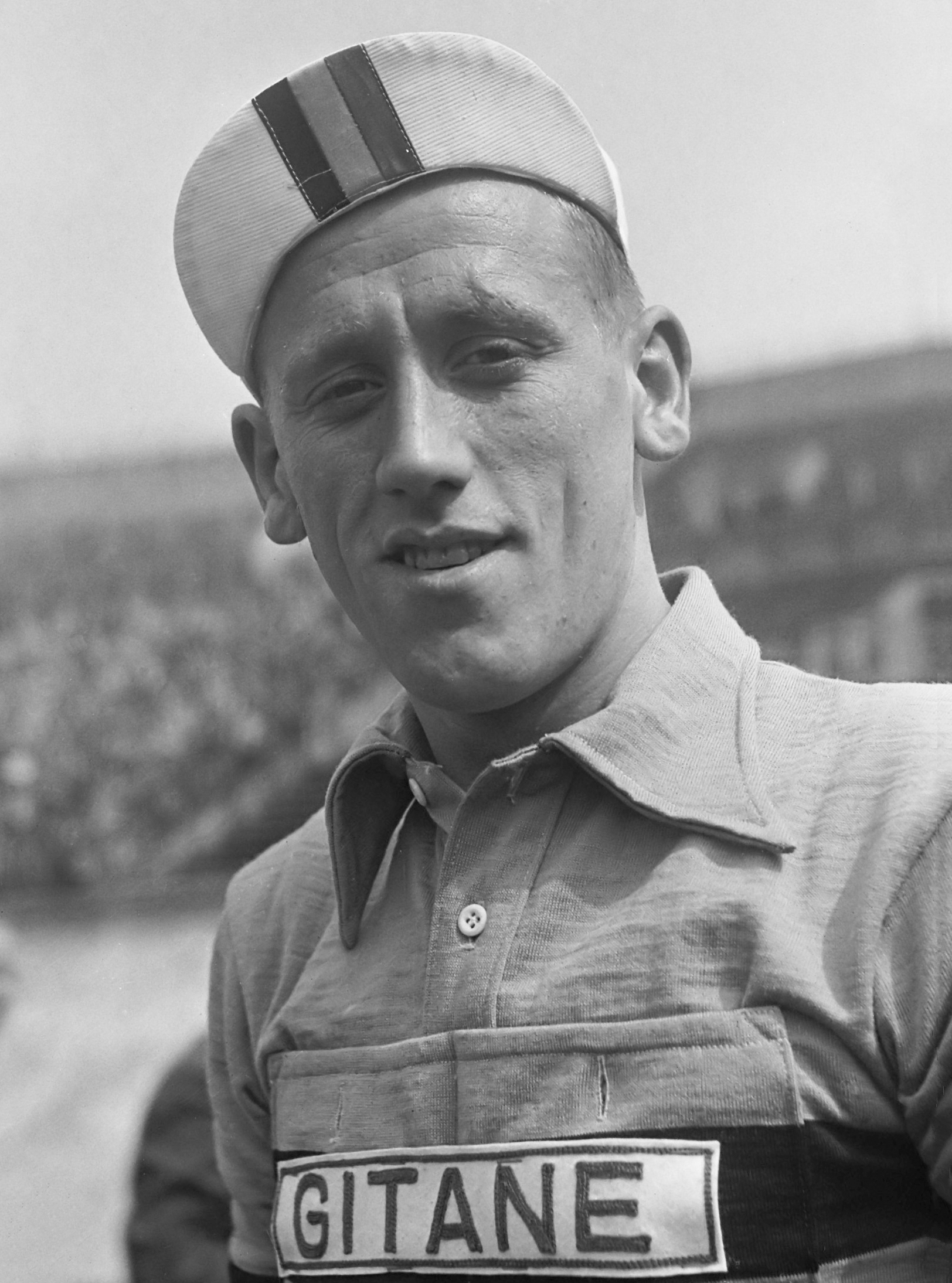
- Jean Brankart in 1954

Personal information
- Full name: Jean Brankart
- Born: 12 July 1930 Momalle, Belgium
- Died: 23 July 2020 (aged 90)

Cycling career
- Sport: Cycling
- Discipline: Road/Track
- Role: Rider

Major wins
- 2 stages 1955 Tour de France; Mountains classification 1958 Giro d'Italia
Medal record
Representing Belgium
World track championships
Bronze medal – third place	1959 Amsterdam	Individual pursuit, professionals

Jean Brankart (12 July 1930 – 23 July 2020) was a Belgian professional road bicycle racer who was active from 1953 to 1960. In 1955, Brankart finished the 1955 Tour de France in second place, winning two stages.

== Major results ==
1953
Hannut
Houdeng
1954
Gembloux
Huy
Waremme
Tour de France:

9th place overall classification

1955
Herve
Charleroi
Tour de France:

2nd place overall classification
winner stages 18 and 21

1956
Belgium national track pursuit champion
Alken
Libramont
Giro d'Italia:

7th place overall classification

1957
Herve
La Hulpe
1958
Belgium national track pursuit champion
Hoegaarden
Namur
Giro d'Italia:

2nd place overall classification
Winner mountains classification

1959
Grand Prix du Midi Libre
Belgium national track pursuit champion
Seraing
Florenville
Hamme
Tour de France:

10th place overall classification
