= Antonin Rolland =

French cyclist

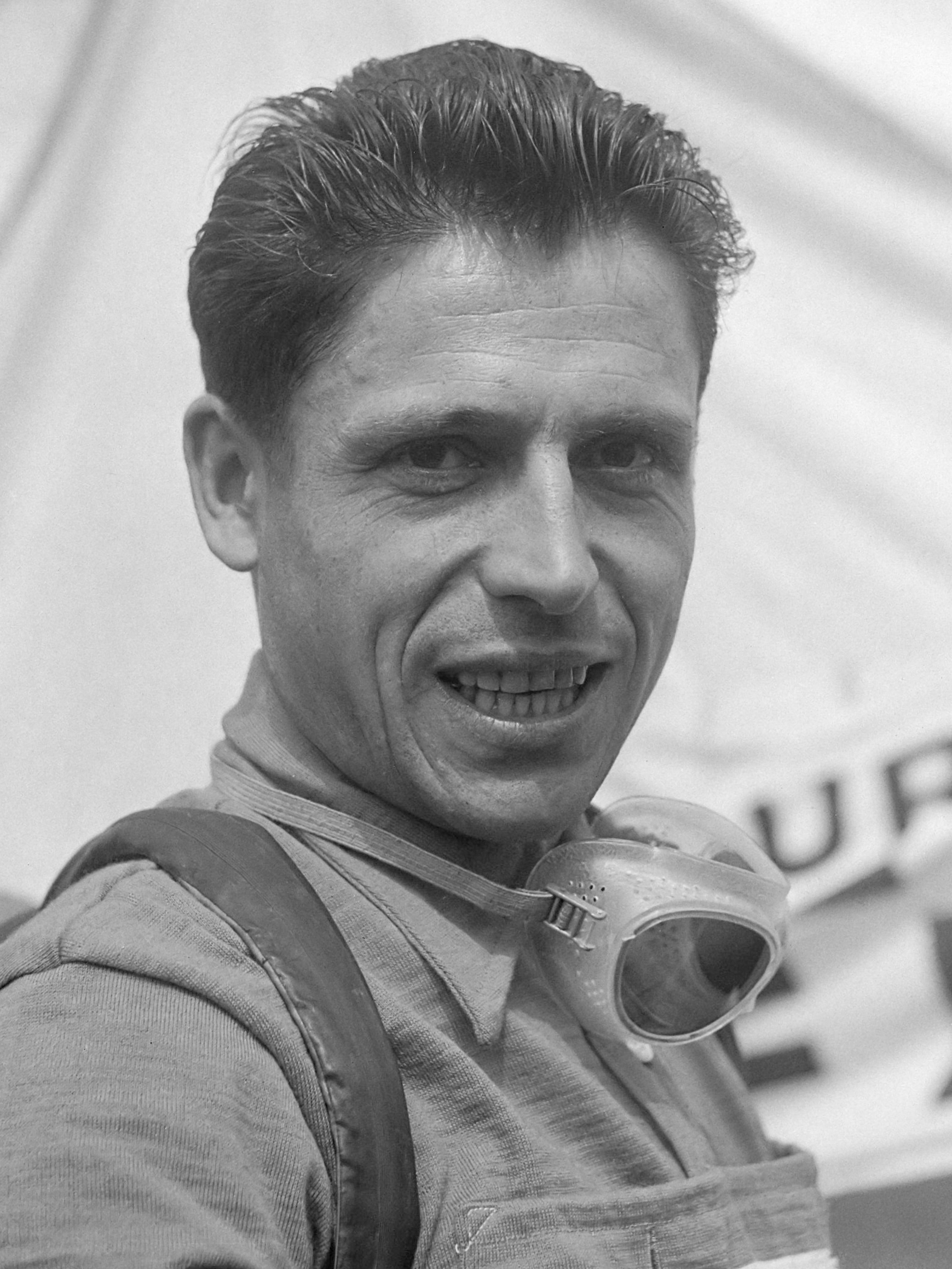

Personal information
- Full name: Antonin Rolland
- Nickname: Tonin le taciturne (Tonin the Taciturn)
- Born: 3 September 1924 (age 102) Sainte-Euphémie, France

Cycling career
- Sport: Cycling
- Discipline: Road
- Role: Rider

Professional teams
- 1946–1948: Rhonson-Dunlop
- 1949: Ricci
- 1950–1951: Rhonson-Dunlop
- 1952–1954: Terrot-Hutchinson
- 1955: L.Bobet-BP-Hutchinson
- 1955: Mercier-Hutchinson
- 1956–1959: L.Bobet-BP-Hutchinson
- 1960: Rochet-Margnat
- 1961: Margnat-Rochet-Dunlop
- 1962: Individual
- 1963: Bertin-Porter 39-Milremo and Still Follis

Major wins
- Grand Tours Tour de France 2 individual stages (1952, 1955) Giro d'Italia 3 individual stages (1957) Stage races Midi Libre (1950, 1956)

Antonin Rolland (born 3 September 1924) is a French former professional cyclist who was active from 1946 to 1963. Rolland won stages in the Tour de France and in the Giro d'Italia. He was born in Sainte-Euphémie, Ain.

In the 1955 Tour de France, Rolland led the general classification for twelve stages, but his team captain Louison Bobet wanted to win his third consecutive Tour, so did not help Rolland to defend the lead. Rolland ended in fifth place that year, his best Tour de France result in his career.

== Major results ==
1946
GP de Thizy
1948
Chauffailles
1950
Grand prix du Midi Libre
1951
Bourg-Geneva-Bourg
1952
Tour de France:

Winner stage 23

1953
Cazès-Mondenard
Nantua
Tour de France:

7th place overall classification

1955
Cluny
Bourg-Geneva-Bourg
Tour de France:

5th place overall classification
Wearing yellow jersey for 12 stages
Winner stage 2

1956
Grand prix du Midi Libre
Oyonnax
1957
GP de Cannes
Mâcon
Giro d'Italia:

Winner stages 3, 7 and 9

1958
Giro di Sardegna
1959
La Charité-sur-Loire
