= Vincent Vitetta =

French cyclist (1925–2021)

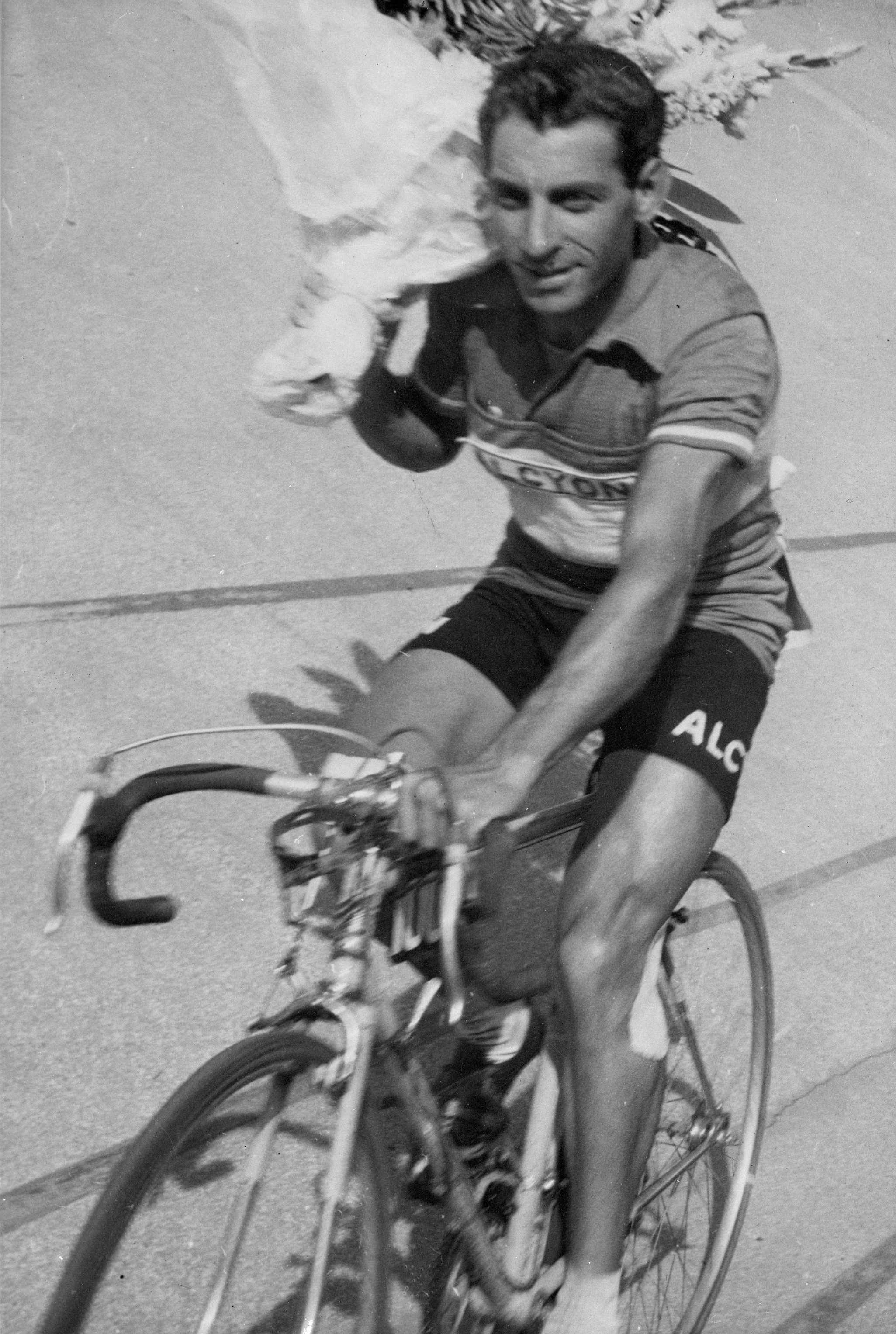

Personal information
- Full name: Vincent Vitetta
- Born: 1 October 1925 Nice, France
- Died: 12 April 2021 (aged 95)

Cycling career
- Sport: Cycling
- Current team: Retired
- Discipline: Road
- Role: Rider

Professional teams
- 1949: Thomas - Rosset
- 1950–1955: Alcyon - Dunlop
- 1956: Essor - Leroux
- 1957: Liberia - Hutchinson - D'Alessendro
- 1958: Urago - D'Alessandro
- 1960: Expressmatic - Coppi

Vincent Vitetta (1 October 1925 in Nice, France – 12 April 2021) was a French cyclist. Professional from 1951 to 1961, he was the winner of the Tour d'Algérie in 1952. He ended his career as an independent racer in 1961.

== Major results ==
1952
Tour d'Algérie
2nd overall GP Algiers
9th overall Critérium du Dauphiné Libéré

1953
GP Côte d'Azur
2nd overall Circuit du Mont Blanc
2nd overall Genova-Nice
2nd overall GP Minaret - Bourg-en-Bresse
7th overall Grand Prix du Midi libre

1954
1st stage Grand Prix du Midi libre
8th overall Tour de France
7th overall GP Algiers
13th overall Milan–San Remo

1955
10th overall Critérium du Dauphiné Libéré
16th overall Tour de France

1956
3rd overall Grand Prix de Cannes
4th overall Marseille-Nice

1957
2nd overall Bourg-Geneva-Bourg

1960
2nd overall Trophy Nice-Matin
2nd overall Tour de la Côte d'Ivoire

== Results at the Grand Tours ==
=== Tour de France ===
- 1951: 33rd
- 1952: 20th
- 1953: 59th
- 1954: 8th
- 1955: 16th
- 1956: 53rd

=== Giro d'Italia ===
- 1955: 74th
