= Alessandro Fantini =

Italian cyclist (1932–1961)

- Fantini in 1960

Personal information
- Full name: Alessandro Fantini
- Born: 1 January 1932 Fossacesia, Kingdom of Italy
- Died: 5 May 1961 (aged 29) Trier, West Germany

Cycling career
- Sport: Cycling
- Discipline: Road
- Role: Rider
- Rider type: Sprinter

Professional teams
- 1955: Lygie
- 1955–1959: Atala
- 1960–1961: Gazzola

Major wins
- Grand Tours Tour de France 2 individual stages (1955, 1956) Giro d'Italia 7 individual stages (1955, 1956, 1957, 1959)

Alessandro Fantini (Fossacesia, 1 January 1932 — Trier, West-Germany, 5 May 1961) was an Italian professional road bicycle racer. After winning the fifth stage, Fantini died after a crash during a mass sprint at the end of the sixth stage of the 1961 Tour of Germany. He was immediately admitted to a hospital, but surgery was impossible due to the large amount of amphetamines in his system. He died two days later.

== Major results ==
=== 1955 ===
- Tour de France – 1st stage: 12
- Giro d'Italia – 1st stages: 4 & 7
- Milano–Torino – 6th
- Giro del Ticino – 7th

=== 1956 ===
- Tour de France – 1st stage: 7
- Giro d'Italia – overall: 6th place, 1st stage: 2 & 4
- Tour de Romandie – place overall: 8th

=== 1957 ===
- Giro d'Italia – 1st stage: 5 & 17
- Roma–Napoli–Roma – 1st stage: 12
- Coppa Bernocchi – 6th

=== 1958 ===
- Gran Piemonte – 2nd
- Giro dell'Emilia – 8th
- Giro della Romagna – 8th

=== 1959 ===
- Giro d'Italia – 1st stage: 16
- Giro dell'Emilia – 2nd
- Giro di Lombardia – 4th
- Tre Valli Varesine – 4th
- Trofeo Matteotti – 4th
- Gran Piemonte – 5th

=== 1960 ===
- Milano–Vignola – 1st
- Deutschland Tour – 1st stage: 1 & 5
- Championship of Zurich – 4th
- Giro di Campania – 8th

=== 1961 ===
- Deutschland Tour – 1st stage: 4
- Milano–Torino – 3rd
- Tour des Quatre-Cantons – 4th

== See also ==
- List of racing cyclists and pacemakers with a cycling-related death
