= Agostino Coletto =

Italian cyclist

Personal information
- Born: 14 August 1927 Avigliana, Italy
- Died: 1 June 2016 (aged 88)

Cycling career
- Sport: Cycling
- Current team: Retired
- Discipline: Road
- Role: Rider

Professional teams
- 1952–1956: Fréjus
- 1957–1960: Carpano
- 1961: Chigi
- 1961: Ignis

Agostino Coletto (14 August 1927 – 1 June 2016) was an Italian racing cyclist.

== Major results ==
1953
3rd Grand Prix des Nations
1954
1st Stage 2 Roma-Napoli-Roma
1st Milano–Torino
2nd Tour de Suisse
5th Giro di Lombardia
1955
1st Stage 3 Roma-Napoli-Roma
5th Giro d'Italia
1956
3rd Giro d'Italia
1958
1st Milano–Torino
1959
3rd Milano–Torino
1960
10th Giro d'Italia
