= Danilo Barozzi =

Italian cyclist (1927–2020)

Personal information
- Born: 21 August 1927 Bagnolo in Piano, Kingdom of Italy
- Died: 25 March 2020 (aged 92) Santa Maria Nuova Hospital, Reggio Emilia, Italy

Cycling career
- Sport: Cycling

Amateur teams
- 1943–1945: SC Azzini
- 1946–1948: Pedale Carpigiano

Professional teams
- 1949–1950: Cimatti
- 1951: Lygie–Pirelli
- 1951–1953: Atala
- 1953: Lygie
- 1953–1954: Allegro
- 1954–1958: Atala–Pirelli

Danilo Barozzi (21 August 1927 – 25 March 2020) was an Italian cyclist.

== Biography ==
Barozzi was a professional cyclist from 1949 to 1958. He won a stage of the Volta a Catalunya in 1950 and the Gran Premio Industria e Commercio di Prato in 1954 and 1956. He died of COVID-19 in 2020.

== Career achievements ==
=== Major results ===
1948
1st Coppa Caivano
1949
2nd Giro di Toscana
3rd Coppa Placci
5th Overall Tour de Suisse
1950
1st Stage 6 Volta a Catalunya
3rd Giro dell'Emilia
1951
3rd Giro del Veneto
9th Milan–San Remo
1952
2nd Giro del Veneto
2nd Coppa Bernocchi
3rd GP Alghero
4th Giro di Romagna
4th Giro di Lombardia
5th Tre Valli Varesine
1953
2nd Trofeo Matteotti
2nd Coppa Placci
3rd Giro di Romagna
3rd Overall Tour de Suisse
1954
1st Gran Premio Industria e Commercio di Prato
1955
2nd Trofeo Matteotti
8th Giro di Lombardia
1956
1st Gran Premio Industria e Commercio di Prato

=== Tour de France ===
- 1958: 38th

=== Giro d'Italia ===
- 1949: DNF
- 1950: DNF
- 1951: 32nd
- 1952: 40th
- 1953: 19th
- 1954: 18th
- 1955: 38th
- 1956: 24th
- 1957: DNF
