= Roger Buchonnet =

French cyclist

Personal information
- Born: 3 May 1926 Magnet, France
- Died: 3 March 2001 (aged 74) Saint-Myon, France

Cycling career
- Sport: Cycling
- Role: Rider

Roger Buchonnet (3 May 1926 – 3 March 2001) was a French racing cyclist. He rode in the 1949 Tour de France and the 1952 Tour de France.
