= Kurt Schneider (cyclist) =

Austrian cyclist (1932–2023)

Personal information
- Born: 1 September 1932 Vienna, First Austrian Republic
- Died: 21 January 2023 (aged 90) Vienna, Austria

Cycling career
- Sport: Cycling
- Role: Rider

Kurt Schneider (1 September 1932 – 21 January 2023) was an Austrian racing cyclist. He rode in the 1954 Tour de France.
