= Pasquale Fornara =

Italian cyclist

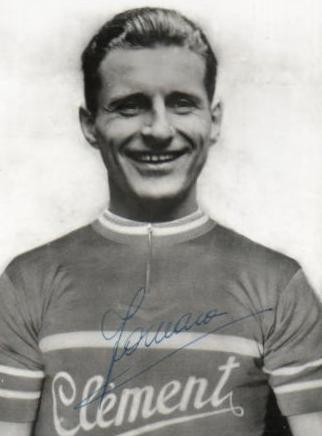

Personal information
- Born: 29 March 1925 Borgomanero, Italy
- Died: 24 July 1990 (aged 65) Borgomanero, Italy

Cycling career
- Sport: Cycling
- Discipline: Road
- Role: Rider

Pasquale Fornara (29 March 1925 – 24 July 1990) was a professional Italian road bicycle racer who gained fame in the 1950s by winning the Tour de Suisse stage race four times, a record that still stands to this day.

In addition to his Tour de Suisse achievements, Fornara won the 1956 Tour de Romandie and finished on the podium in two Grand Tours: a third place behind the legendary Fausto Coppi at the 1953 Giro d'Italia and a second place at the 1958 Vuelta a España behind Frenchman Jean Stablinski.

== Major achievements ==
1952
1st, Overall, Tour de Suisse (and 2 stage wins)
1st, Stage, Giro d'Italia
1953
3rd, Overall, Giro d’Italia (and 1 stage win)

1st, King of the Mountains

1954
1st, Overall, Tour de Suisse
1955
4th, Overall, Tour de France
1st, Stage, Giro d’Italia
1956
1st, Overall, Tour de Romandie
1st, Stage, Giro d'Italia
24th, Overall, Tour de France
1957
1st, Overall, Tour de Suisse (and 1 stage win)

1st, King of the Mountains

1958
1st, Overall, Tour de Suisse (and 2 stage wins)
2nd, Overall, Vuelta a España
