= Bruno Monti =

Italian cyclist (1930–2011)

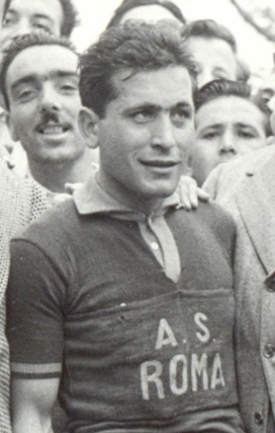
- Monti in 1952

Personal information
- Born: 12 June 1930 Albano Laziale, Italy
- Died: 16 August 2011 (aged 81) Rome, Italy

Cycling career
- Sport: Cycling
Medal record
Representing Italy
Men's cycling
Olympic Games
Silver medal – second place	1952 Helsinki	Team road race

Bruno Monti (12 June 1930 – 16 August 2011) was an Italian road cyclist. As an amateur, he won the Piccolo Giro di Lombardia and an Olympic silver medal in the team road race in 1952. In 1953, he turned professional and rode the Giro d'Italia in 1953, 1955–1957 and 1959 and the Tour de France in 1955 and 1956. He won three stages of the Giro in 1953 and 1957, and placed eighth overall in 1956.
