= List of teams and cyclists in the 1950 Tour de France =

List of cyclists

As was the custom since 1930, the 1950 Tour de France was contested by national and regional teams. The three major cycling countries in 1950, Italy, Belgium and France, each sent a team of 10 cyclists. Other countries sent teams of 6 cyclists: Switzerland, Luxembourg and the Netherlands. Italy and Belgium also sent two extra teams of young riders of 6 cyclists each. The French regional cyclists were divided into five teams of 10 cyclists: Paris, Ile de France–North East, West, Centre–South West and South East. Originally, the plan was to have one extra international team of six cyclists with Spanish cyclists, but this extra team became a North African team, with Moroccan and Algerian cyclists, both being French colonies at the time. Altogether this made 116 cyclists. There were 60 French cyclists (of which 2 French-Moroccan and 4 French-Algerian), 22 Italian, 16 Belgian, 6 Dutch, 6 Luxembourg and 6 Swiss cyclists.

The winner of the previous Tour de France, Fausto Coppi, was injured during the 1950 Giro d'Italia, so he could not defend his title. Still the Italians were favourites, especially Gino Bartali, who had come second in the 1950 Giro d'Italia behind Hugo Koblet, who did not enter the 1950 Tour de France. Other candidates for the victory were Bobet, Kübler, Ockers and Geminiani. Two days before the Tour started, the organisation held a poll amongst 25 journalists, who each gave their eight favourites for the victory. Bartali was on the most lists, 23. Robic was written on 20 lists, Lauredi on 19, Bobet and Goldschmidt on 17. On the first day of the race, before the Tour had started, French cyclist Charles Coste was replaced by Paul Giguet.

== Start list ==
=== By team ===
Italy
No.	Rider	Pos.
1	Gino Bartali (ITA)	DNF
2	Serafino Biagioni (ITA)	DNF
3	Angelo Brignole (ITA)	DNF
4	Giovanni Corrieri (ITA)	DNF
5	Guido De Santi (ITA)	DNF
6	Attilio Lambertini (ITA)	DNF
7	Fiorenzo Magni (ITA)	DNF
8	Silvio Pedroni (ITA)	DNF
9	Luciano Pezzi (ITA)	DNF
10	Virgilio Salimbeni (ITA)	DNF

Belgium
No.	Rider	Pos.
11	Maurice Blomme (BEL)	DNF
12	Hilaire Couvreur (BEL)	DNF
13	Marcel Dupont (BEL)	DNF
14	Marcel Hendrickx (BEL)	25
15	Raymond Impanis (BEL)	8
16	Roger Lambrecht (BEL)	13
17	Stan Ockers (BEL)	2
18	Briek Schotte (BEL)	22
19	Edward Van Ende (BEL)	DNF
20	Jozef Verhaert (BEL)	DNF

France
No.	Rider	Pos.
21	Émile Baffert (FRA)	48
22	Louison Bobet (FRA)	3
23	Paul Giguet (FRA)	24
24	Louis Deprez (FRA)	DNF
25	Robert Desbats (FRA)	46
26	Raphaël Géminiani (FRA)	4
27	Nello Lauredi (FRA)	37
28	Apo Lazaridès (FRA)	28
29	Jacques Marinelli (FRA)	DNF
30	Pierre Molinéris (FRA)	36

Switzerland
No.	Rider	Pos.
31	Georges Aeschlimann (SUI)	41
32	Emilio Croci-Torti (SUI)	43
33	Ferdinand Kübler (SUI)	1
34	Martin Metzger (SUI)	DNF
35	Gottfried Weilenmann (SUI)	50
36	Fritz Zbinden (SUI)	51

Luxembourg
No.	Rider	Pos.
37	Bim Diederich (LUX)	18
38	Marcel Ernzer (LUX)	DNF
39	Jean Goldschmit (LUX)	10
40	Henri Kellen (LUX)	DNF
41	Willy Kemp (LUX)	21
42	Jeng Kirchen (LUX)	5

Netherlands
No.	Rider	Pos.
43	Henk De Hoog (NED)	DNF
44	Wim De Ruyter (NED)	27
45	Sjefke Janssen (NED)	DNF
46	Gerrit Voorting (NED)	DNF
47	Frans Vos (NED)	DNF
48	Wout Wagtmans (NED)	DNF

Italy Cadets
No.	Rider	Pos.
49	Valerio Bonini (ITA)	DNF
50	Giulio Bresci (ITA)	DNF
51	Alberto Ghirardi (ITA)	DNF
52	Adolfo Leoni (ITA)	DNF
53	Alfredo Pasotti (ITA)	DNF
54	Remo Sabatini (ITA)	DNF

Belgium Eaglets
No.	Rider	Pos.
55	Armand Baeyens (BEL)	23
56	Marcel De Mulder (BEL)	16
57	Isidore De Rijck (BEL)	DNF
58	Albert Dubuisson (BEL)	DNF
59	Jean Storms (BEL)	DNF
60	Marcel Verschueren (BEL)	15

France – Paris
No.	Rider	Pos.
61	Jean Baldassari (FRA)	30
62	José Beyaert (FRA)	47
63	Serge Blusson (FRA)	42
64	Robert Chapatte (FRA)	DNF
65	Robert Dorgebray (FRA)	DNF
66	Dominique Forlini (FRA)	DNF
67	Antoine Frankowski (FRA)	DNF
68	Lucien Lauk (FRA)	DNF
69	Maurice Quentin (FRA)	DNF
70	Jacques Renaud (FRA)	DNF

France – Île-de-France/North-East
No.	Rider	Pos.
71	Gilbert Bauvin (FRA)	49
72	André Brulé (FRA)	14
73	Maurice De Muer (FRA)	32
74	Kléber Piot (FRA)	6
75	Galiano Pividori (ITA)	DNF
76	Roger Queugnet (FRA)	DNF
77	Attilio Redolfi (FRA)	20
78	Nello Sforacchi (ITA)	DNF
79	Pierre Tacca (FRA)	DNF
80	Daniel Thuayre (FRA)	DNF

France – West
No.	Rider	Pos.
81	Armand Audaire (FRA)	DNF
82	Robert Bonnaventure (FRA)	44
83	Roger Chupin (FRA)	DNF
84	Roger Creton (FRA)	39
85	Basile De Cortes (FRA)	DNF
86	Jean-Marie Goasmat (FRA)	35
87	André Mahé (FRA)	DNF
88	Roger Pontet (FRA)	DNF
89	Jean Robic (FRA)	12
90	Gino Sciardis (FRA)	33

France – Centre/South-West
No.	Rider	Pos.
91	René Berton (FRA)	DNF
92	Pierre Cogan (FRA)	7
93	Armand Darnauguilhem (FRA)	DNF
94	Marcel Dussault (FRA)	31
95	Bernard Fernandez (FRA)	DNF
96	Noël Lajoie (FRA)	45
97	Georges Meunier (FRA)	9
98	Alain Moineau (FRA)	DNF
99	Paul Pineau (FRA)	DNF
100	Hervé Prouzet (FRA)	DNF

France – South-East
No.	Rider	Pos.
101	Marius Bonnet (FRA)	DNF
102	Pierre Brambilla (FRA)	11
103	Antonin Canavese (FRA)	DNF
104	Robert Castellin (FRA)	19
105	Bernard Gauthier (FRA)	17
106	Robert Kallert (FRA)	38
107	Paul Néri (ITA)	DNF
108	Raoul Rémy (FRA)	34
109	Emile Rol (FRA)	DNF
110	Antonin Rolland (FRA)	29

North Africa
No.	Rider	Pos.
111	Max Charroin (FRA)	DNF
112	Custodio Dos Reis (FRA)	26
113	Ahmed Kebaili (FRA)	40
114	Marcel Molinès (FRA)	DNF
115	Abdel-Kader Zaaf (FRA)	DNF
116	Marcel Zelasco (FRA)	DNF

=== By rider ===
Legend
No.	Starting number worn by the rider during the Tour
Pos.	Position in the general classification
DNF	Denotes a rider who did not finish

No.	Name	Nationality	Team	Pos.	Ref
1	Gino Bartali	Italy	Italy	DNF	
2	Serafino Biagioni	Italy	Italy	DNF	
3	Angelo Brignole	Italy	Italy	DNF	
4	Giovanni Corrieri	Italy	Italy	DNF	
5	Guido De Santi	Italy	Italy	DNF	
6	Attilio Lambertini	Italy	Italy	DNF	
7	Fiorenzo Magni	Italy	Italy	DNF	
8	Silvio Pedroni	Italy	Italy	DNF	
9	Luciano Pezzi	Italy	Italy	DNF	
10	Virgilio Salimbeni	Italy	Italy	DNF	
11	Maurice Blomme	Belgium	Belgium	DNF	
12	Hilaire Couvreur	Belgium	Belgium	DNF	
13	Marcel Dupont	Belgium	Belgium	DNF	
14	Marcel Hendrickx	Belgium	Belgium	25	
15	Raymond Impanis	Belgium	Belgium	8	
16	Roger Lambrecht	Belgium	Belgium	13	
17	Stan Ockers	Belgium	Belgium	2	
18	Briek Schotte	Belgium	Belgium	22	
19	Eduard Van Ende	Belgium	Belgium	DNF	
20	Jozef Verhaert	Belgium	Belgium	DNF	
21	Émile Baffert	France	France	48	
22	Louison Bobet	France	France	3	
23	Paul Giguet	France	France	24	
24	Louis Deprez	France	France	DNF	
25	Robert Desbats	France	France	46	
26	Raphaël Géminiani	France	France	4	
27	Nello Lauredi	France	France	37	
28	Apo Lazaridès	France	France	28	
29	Jacques Marinelli	France	France	DNF	
30	Pierre Molinéris	France	France	36	
31	Georges Aeschlimann	Switzerland	Switzerland	41	
32	Emilio Croci-Torti	Switzerland	Switzerland	43	
33	Ferdinand Kübler	Switzerland	Switzerland	1	
34	Martin Metzger	Switzerland	Switzerland	DNF	
35	Gottfried Weilenmann	Switzerland	Switzerland	50	
36	Fritz Zbinden	Switzerland	Switzerland	51	
37	Bim Diederich	Luxembourg	Luxembourg	18	
38	Marcel Ernzer	Luxembourg	Luxembourg	DNF	
39	Jean Goldschmit	Luxembourg	Luxembourg	10	
40	Henri Kellen	Luxembourg	Luxembourg	DNF	
41	Willy Kemp	Luxembourg	Luxembourg	21	
42	Jeng Kirchen	Luxembourg	Luxembourg	5	
43	Henk De Hoog	Netherlands	Netherlands	DNF	
44	Wim De Ruyter	Netherlands	Netherlands	27	
45	Sjefke Janssen	Netherlands	Netherlands	DNF	
46	Gerrit Voorting	Netherlands	Netherlands	DNF	
47	Frans Vos	Netherlands	Netherlands	DNF	
48	Wout Wagtmans	Netherlands	Netherlands	DNF	
49	Valerio Bonini	Italy	Italy Cadets	DNF	
50	Giulio Bresci	Italy	Italy Cadets	DNF	
51	Alberto Ghirardi	Italy	Italy Cadets	DNF	
52	Adolfo Leoni	Italy	Italy Cadets	DNF	
53	Alfredo Pasotti	Italy	Italy Cadets	DNF	
54	Remo Sabattini	Italy	Italy Cadets	DNF	
55	Armand Baeyens	Belgium	Belgium Eaglets	23	
56	Marcel De Mulder	Belgium	Belgium Eaglets	16	
57	Isidoor De Ryck	Belgium	Belgium Eaglets	DNF	
58	Albert Dubuisson	Belgium	Belgium Eaglets	DNF	
59	Jean Storms	Belgium	Belgium Eaglets	DNF	
60	Marcel Verschueren	Belgium	Belgium Eaglets	15	
61	Jean Baldassari	France	France – Paris	30	
62	José Beyaert	France	France – Paris	47	
63	Serge Blusson	France	France – Paris	42	
64	Robert Chapatte	France	France – Paris	DNF	
65	Robert Dorgebray	France	France – Paris	DNF	
66	Dominique Forlini	France	France – Paris	DNF	
67	Antoine Frankowski	France	France – Paris	DNF	
68	Lucien Lauk	France	France – Paris	DNF	
69	Maurice Quentin	France	France – Paris	DNF	
70	Jacques Renaud	France	France – Paris	DNF	
71	Gilbert Bauvin	France	France – Île-de-France/North-East	49	
72	André Brulé	France	France – Île-de-France/North-East	14	
73	Maurice De Muer	France	France – Île-de-France/North-East	32	
74	Kléber Piot	France	France – Île-de-France/North-East	6	
75	Galiano Pividori	Italy	France – Île-de-France/North-East	DNF	
76	Roger Queugnet	France	France – Île-de-France/North-East	DNF	
77	Attilio Redolfi	France	France – Île-de-France/North-East	20	
78	Nello Sforacchi	Italy	France – Île-de-France/North-East	DNF	
79	Giuseppe Tacca	France	France – Île-de-France/North-East	DNF	
80	Daniel Thuayre	France	France – Île-de-France/North-East	DNF	
81	Armand Audaire	France	France – West	DNF	
82	Robert Bonnaventure	France	France – West	44	
83	Roger Chupin	France	France – West	DNF	
84	Roger Creton	France	France – West	39	
85	Basile Decortès	France	France – West	DNF	
86	Jean-Marie Goasmat	France	France – West	35	
87	André Mahé	France	France – West	DNF	
88	Roger Pontet	France	France – West	DNF	
89	Jean Robic	France	France – West	12	
90	Gino Sciardis	France	France – West	33	
91	René Berton	France	France – Centre/South-West	DNF	
92	Pierre Cogan	France	France – Centre/South-West	7	
93	Armand Darnauguilhem	France	France – Centre/South-West	DNF	
94	Marcel Dussault	France	France – Centre/South-West	31	
95	Bernard Fernandez	France	France – Centre/South-West	DNF	
96	Noël Lajoie	France	France – Centre/South-West	45	
97	Georges Meunier	France	France – Centre/South-West	9	
98	Alain Moineau	France	France – Centre/South-West	DNF	
99	Paul Pineau	France	France – Centre/South-West	DNF	
100	Hervé Prouzet	France	France – Centre/South-West	DNF	
101	Marius Bonnet	France	France – South-East	DNF	
102	Pierre Brambilla	France	France – South-East	11	
103	Antonin Canavese	France	France – South-East	DNF	
104	Robert Castelin	France	France – South-East	19	
105	Bernard Gauthier	France	France – South-East	17	
106	Maurice Kallert	France	France – South-East	38	
107	Paul Néri	Italy	France – South-East	DNF	
108	Raoul Rémy	France	France – South-East	34	
109	Emile Rol	France	France – South-East	DNF	
110	Antonin Rolland	France	France – South-East	29	
111	Max Charroin	France	North Africa	DNF	
112	Custodio Dos Reis	France	North Africa	26	
113	Ahmed Kebaili	France	North Africa	40	
114	Marcel Molinès	France	North Africa	DNF	
115	Abdel-Kader Zaaf	France	North Africa	DNF	
116	Marcel Zelasco	France	North Africa	DNF	
