= 1950 Tour de France, Stage 1 to Stage 11 =

Cycling race stages

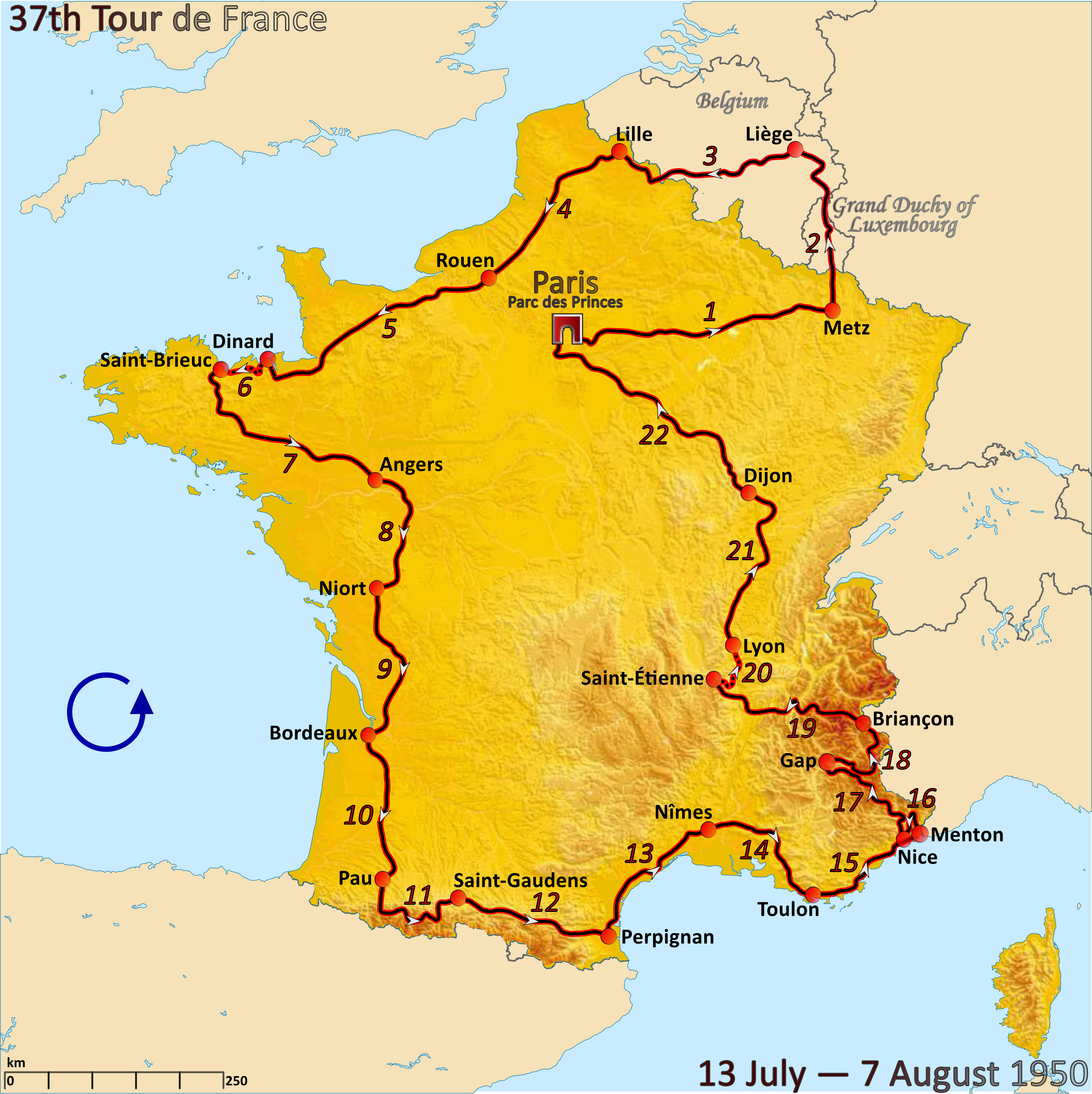
Route of the 1950 Tour de France

The 1950 Tour de France was the 37th edition of Tour de France, one of cycling's Grand Tours. The Tour began in Paris with a flat stage on 13 July and Stage 11 occurred on 25 July with a mountainous stage to Saint-Gaudens. The race finished in Paris on 7 August.

== Stage 1 ==
13 July 1950 - Paris to Metz, 307 km (190.8 mi)

Stage 1 result

Rank	Rider	Team	Time
1	Jean Goldschmit (LUX)	Luxembourg	9h 23' 08"
2	Raoul Rémy (FRA)	France – South-East	s.t.
3	Roger Lambrecht (BEL)	Belgium	s.t.
4	Attilio Redolfi (FRA)	France – Île-de-France/North-East	+ 34"
5	Robert Chapatte (FRA)	France – Paris	s.t.
6	Kléber Piot (FRA)	France – Île-de-France/North-East	s.t.
7	Jeng Kirchen (LUX)	Luxembourg	+ 1' 10"
8	Ferdinand Kübler (SUI)	Switzerland	+ 1' 18"
9	Remo Sabattini (ITA)	Italy Cadets	s.t.
10	Galiano Pividori (ITA)	France – Île-de-France/North-East	s.t.

General classification after stage 1

Rank	Rider	Team	Time
1	Jean Goldschmit (LUX)	Luxembourg	9h 22' 08"
2	Raoul Rémy (FRA)	France – South-East	+ 30"
3	Roger Lambrecht (BEL)	Belgium	+ 1' 00"
4	Attilio Redolfi (FRA)	France – Île-de-France/North-East	+ 1' 34"
5	Robert Chapatte (FRA)	France – Paris	s.t.
6	Kléber Piot (FRA)	France – Île-de-France/North-East	s.t.
7	Jeng Kirchen (LUX)	Luxembourg	+ 2' 10"
8	Ferdinand Kübler (SUI)	Switzerland	+ 2' 18"
9	Remo Sabattini (ITA)	Italy Cadets	s.t.
10	Galiano Pividori (ITA)	France – Île-de-France/North-East	s.t.

== Stage 2 ==
14 July 1950 - Metz to Liège, 241 km (149.8 mi)

Stage 2 result

Rank	Rider	Team	Time
1	Adolfo Leoni (ITA)	Italy Cadets	7h 02' 07"
2	Fiorenzo Magni (ITA)	Italy	s.t.
3	Louison Bobet (FRA)	France	s.t.
4	Ferdinand Kübler (SUI)	Switzerland	s.t.
5	Briek Schotte (BEL)	Belgium	s.t.
6	Marcel Hendrickx (BEL)	Belgium	s.t.
7	Hilaire Couvreur (BEL)	Belgium	s.t.
8	Jean Storms (BEL)	Belgium Eaglets	s.t.
9	Gino Bartali (ITA)	Italy	s.t.
10	Jeng Kirchen (LUX)	Luxembourg	s.t.

General classification after stage 2

Rank	Rider	Team	Time
1	Jean Goldschmit (LUX)	Luxembourg	16h 24' 15"
2	Roger Lambrecht (BEL)	Belgium	+ 1' 00"
3	Adolfo Leoni (ITA)	Italy Cadets	+ 1' 18"
4	Robert Chapatte (FRA)	France – Paris	+ 1' 34"
5	Kléber Piot (FRA)	France – Île-de-France/North-East	s.t.
6	Fiorenzo Magni (ITA)	Italy	+ 1' 48"
7	Jeng Kirchen (LUX)	Luxembourg	+ 2' 10"
8	Ferdinand Kübler (SUI)	Switzerland	+ 2' 18"
9	Bim Diederich (LUX)	Luxembourg	s.t.
10	Gino Bartali (ITA)	Italy	s.t.

== Stage 3 ==
15 July 1950 - Liège to Lille, 232.5 km (144.5 mi)

Stage 3 result

Rank	Rider	Team	Time
1	Alfredo Pasotti (ITA)	Italy Cadets	6h 52' 37"
2	Maurice Blomme (BEL)	Belgium	s.t.
3	Maurice De Muer (FRA)	France – Île-de-France/North-East	s.t.
4	Attilio Lambertini (ITA)	Italy	s.t.
5	Silvio Pedroni (ITA)	Italy	s.t.
6	Bernard Gauthier (FRA)	France – South-East	s.t.
7	Isidore De Rijck (BEL)	Belgium Eaglets	s.t.
8	Attilio Redolfi (FRA)	France – Île-de-France/North-East	+ 1' 57"
9	Marcel Hendrickx (BEL)	Belgium	+ 3' 34"
10	Jean Storms (BEL)	Belgium Eaglets	+ 3' 36"

General classification after stage 3

Rank	Rider	Team	Time
1	Bernard Gauthier (FRA)	France – South-East	23h 19' 10"
2	Alfredo Pasotti (ITA)	Italy Cadets	+ 5"
3	Jean Goldschmit (LUX)	Luxembourg	+ 2' 00"
4	Maurice De Muer (FRA)	France – Île-de-France/North-East	+ 2' 14"
5	Roger Lambrecht (BEL)	Belgium	+ 3' 00"
6	Kléber Piot (FRA)	France – Île-de-France/North-East	+ 3' 15"
7	Marcel Hendrickx (BEL)	Belgium	+ 3' 34"
8	Jean Storms (BEL)	Belgium Eaglets	+ 3' 36"
9	Georges Meunier (FRA)	France – Centre/South-West	+ 3' 59"
10	Jeng Kirchen (LUX)	Luxembourg	+ 4' 10"

== Stage 4 ==
16 July 1950 - Lille to Rouen, 231 km (144 mi)

Stage 4 result

Rank	Rider	Team	Time
1	Stan Ockers (BEL)	Belgium	7h 12' 26"
2	Antonin Rolland (FRA)	France – South-East	+ 12"
3	Maurice Blomme (BEL)	Belgium	s.t.
4	Jean Goldschmit (LUX)	Luxembourg	s.t.
5	Jacques Marinelli (FRA)	France	s.t.
6	Bernard Gauthier (FRA)	France – South-East	s.t.
7	Albert Dubuisson (BEL)	Belgium Eaglets	+ 22"
8	Jean Robic (FRA)	France – West	+ 24"
9	Daniel Thuayre (FRA)	France – Île-de-France/North-East	s.t.
10	Serge Blusson (FRA)	France – Paris	s.t.

General classification after stage 4

Rank	Rider	Team	Time
1	Bernard Gauthier (FRA)	France – South-East	30h 31' 44"
2	Jean Goldschmit (LUX)	Luxembourg	+ 2' 00"
3	Maurice De Muer (FRA)	France – Île-de-France/North-East	+ 2' 26"
4	Roger Lambrecht (BEL)	Belgium	+ 3' 12"
5	Kléber Piot (FRA)	France – Île-de-France/North-East	+ 3' 27"
6	Jean Storms (BEL)	Belgium Eaglets	+ 3' 48"
7	Georges Meunier (FRA)	France – Centre/South-West	+ 4' 11"
8	Jeng Kirchen (LUX)	Luxembourg	+ 4' 22"
9	Ferdinand Kübler (SUI)	Switzerland	+ 4' 30"
10	Briek Schotte (BEL)	Belgium	s.t.

== Stage 5 ==
17 July 1950 - Rouen to Dinard, 316 km (196 mi)

Stage 5 result

Rank	Rider	Team	Time
1	Giovanni Corrieri (ITA)	Italy	10h 35' 51"
2	Robert Desbats (FRA)	France	s.t.
3	Hervé Prouzet (FRA)	France – Centre/South-West	+ 20"
4	Gino Sciardis (FRA)	France – West	+ 25"
5	Georges Meunier (FRA)	France – Centre/South-West	s.t.
6	Attilio Lambertini (ITA)	Italy	s.t.
7	Noël Lajoie (FRA)	France – Centre/South-West	+ 35"
8	Albert Dubuisson (BEL)	Belgium Eaglets	+ 41"
9	Stan Ockers (BEL)	Belgium	+ 45"
10	André Brulé (FRA)	France – Île-de-France/North-East	s.t.

General classification after stage 5

Rank	Rider	Team	Time
1	Bernard Gauthier (FRA)	France – South-East	41h 08' 20"
2	Jean Goldschmit (LUX)	Luxembourg	+ 2' 00"
3	Maurice De Muer (FRA)	France – Île-de-France/North-East	+ 2' 26"
4	Roger Lambrecht (BEL)	Belgium	+ 3' 12"
5	Kléber Piot (FRA)	France – Île-de-France/North-East	+ 3' 27"
6	Jean Storms (BEL)	Belgium Eaglets	+ 3' 48"
7	Georges Meunier (FRA)	France – Centre/South-West	+ 3' 51"
8	Jeng Kirchen (LUX)	Luxembourg	+ 4' 22"
9	Ferdinand Kübler (SUI)	Switzerland	+ 4' 30"
10	Briek Schotte (BEL)	Belgium	s.t.

== Rest Day 1 ==
18 July 1950 - Dinard

== Stage 6 ==
19 July 1950 - Dinard to Saint-Brieuc, 78 km (48 mi) (ITT)

Stage 6 result

Rank	Rider	Team	Time
1	Ferdinand Kübler (SUI)	Switzerland	1h 57' 22"
2	Fiorenzo Magni (ITA)	Italy	+ 17"
3	Jean Goldschmit (LUX)	Luxembourg	+ 56"
4	Maurice Blomme (BEL)	Belgium	+ 1' 16"
5	Roger Lambrecht (BEL)	Belgium	+ 2' 55"
6	Louison Bobet (FRA)	France	s.t.
7	Stan Ockers (BEL)	Belgium	+ 3' 26"
8	Bernard Gauthier (FRA)	France – South-East	+ 3' 43"
9	Marcel Dussault (FRA)	France – Centre/South-West	+ 4' 01"
10	Georges Meunier (FRA)	France – Centre/South-West	+ 4' 34"

General classification after stage 6

Rank	Rider	Team	Time
1	Jean Goldschmit (LUX)	Luxembourg	43h 08' 38"
2	Bernard Gauthier (FRA)	France – South-East	+ 47"
3	Ferdinand Kübler (SUI)	Switzerland	+ 49"
4	Fiorenzo Magni (ITA)	Italy	+ 2' 37"
5	Roger Lambrecht (BEL)	Belgium	+ 3' 11"
6	Maurice Blomme (BEL)	Belgium	+ 4' 33"
7	Louison Bobet (FRA)	France	+ 5' 23"
8	Georges Meunier (FRA)	France – Centre/South-West	+ 5' 29"
9	Stan Ockers (BEL)	Belgium	+ 5' 44"
10	Jeng Kirchen (LUX)	Luxembourg	+ 6' 06"

== Stage 7 ==
20 July 1950 - Saint-Brieuc to Angers, 248 km (154 mi)

Stage 7 result

Rank	Rider	Team	Time
1	Nello Lauredi (FRA)	France	6h 43' 05"
2	Gino Sciardis (FRA)	France – West	s.t.
3	Attilio Lambertini (ITA)	Italy	s.t.
4	Attilio Redolfi (FRA)	France – Île-de-France/North-East	s.t.
5	Roger Chupin (FRA)	France – West	s.t.
6	Hilaire Couvreur (BEL)	Belgium	s.t.
7	Marcel De Mulder (BEL)	Belgium Eaglets	s.t.
8	Gilbert Bauvin (FRA)	France – Île-de-France/North-East	s.t.
9	Alberto Ghirardi (ITA)	Italy Cadets	s.t.
10	Robert Castelin (FRA)	France – South-East	s.t.

General classification after stage 7

Rank	Rider	Team	Time
1	Bernard Gauthier (FRA)	France – South-East	49h 52' 30"
2	Attilio Redolfi (FRA)	France – Île-de-France/North-East	+ 9' 20"
3	Jean Goldschmit (LUX)	Luxembourg	+ 10' 35"
4	Pierre Brambilla (FRA)	France – South-East	+ 11' 23"
5	Ferdinand Kübler (SUI)	Switzerland	+ 11' 24"
6	Hilaire Couvreur (BEL)	Belgium	+ 13' 08"
7	Fiorenzo Magni (ITA)	Italy	+ 13' 12"
8	Roger Lambrecht (BEL)	Belgium	+ 13' 46"
9	Maurice Blomme (BEL)	Belgium	+ 15' 08"
10	Gilbert Bauvin (FRA)	France – Île-de-France/North-East	+ 15' 09"

== Stage 8 ==
21 July 1950 - Angers to Niort, 181 km (112 mi)

Stage 8 result

Rank	Rider	Team	Time
1	Fiorenzo Magni (ITA)	Italy	4h 36' 30"
2	Stan Ockers (BEL)	Belgium	s.t.
3	Georges Meunier (FRA)	France – Centre/South-West	s.t.
4	Louison Bobet (FRA)	France	+ 4"
5	Serge Blusson (FRA)	France – Paris	+ 45"
6	Dominique Forlini (FRA)	France – Paris	s.t.
7	Alfredo Pasotti (ITA)	Italy Cadets	s.t.
8	Jean Baldassari (FRA)	France – Paris	s.t.
9	Maurice Blomme (BEL)	Belgium	s.t.
10	Valerio Bonini (ITA)	Italy Cadets	s.t.

General classification after stage 8

Rank	Rider	Team	Time
1	Bernard Gauthier (FRA)	France – South-East	54h 29' 45"
2	Attilio Redolfi (FRA)	France – Île-de-France/North-East	+ 9' 20"
3	Jean Goldschmit (LUX)	Luxembourg	+ 10' 35"
4	Pierre Brambilla (FRA)	France – South-East	+ 11' 23"
5	Ferdinand Kübler (SUI)	Switzerland	+ 11' 24"
6	Fiorenzo Magni (ITA)	Italy	+ 11' 27"
7	Hilaire Couvreur (BEL)	Belgium	+ 13' 08"
8	Roger Lambrecht (BEL)	Belgium	+ 13' 46"
9	Stan Ockers (BEL)	Belgium	+ 15' 04"
10	Maurice Blomme (BEL)	Belgium	+ 15' 08"

== Stage 9 ==
22 July 1950 - Niort to Bordeaux, 206 km (128 mi)

Stage 9 result

Rank	Rider	Team	Time
1	Alfredo Pasotti (ITA)	Italy Cadets	5h 30' 25"
2	Briek Schotte (BEL)	Belgium	s.t.
3	Valerio Bonini (ITA)	Italy Cadets	s.t.
4	Robert Desbats (FRA)	France	s.t.
5	Silvio Pedroni (ITA)	Italy	s.t.
6	Raphaël Géminiani (FRA)	France	s.t.
7	Armand Darnauguilhem (FRA)	France – Centre/South-West	+ 2' 55"
8	Gino Sciardis (FRA)	France – West	+ 3' 09"
9	Jean Baldassari (FRA)	France – Paris	s.t.
10	Émile Baffert (FRA)	France	s.t.

General classification after stage 9

Rank	Rider	Team	Time
1	Bernard Gauthier (FRA)	France – South-East	60h 03' 19"
2	Attilio Redolfi (FRA)	France – Île-de-France/North-East	+ 9' 20"
3	Jean Goldschmit (LUX)	Luxembourg	+ 10' 35"
4	Pierre Brambilla (FRA)	France – South-East	+ 11' 23"
5	Ferdinand Kübler (SUI)	Switzerland	+ 11' 24"
6	Fiorenzo Magni (ITA)	Italy	+ 11' 27"
7	Hilaire Couvreur (BEL)	Belgium	+ 13' 08"
8	Roger Lambrecht (BEL)	Belgium	+ 13' 46"
9	Briek Schotte (BEL)	Belgium	+ 14' 27"
10	Raphaël Géminiani (FRA)	France	+ 14' 52"

== Stage 10 ==
23 July 1950 - Bordeaux to Pau, 202 km (126 mi)

Stage 10 result

Rank	Rider	Team	Time
1	Marcel Dussault (FRA)	France – Centre/South-West	5h 28' 59"
2	Hervé Prouzet (FRA)	France – Centre/South-West	+ 8' 46"
3	Bim Diederich (LUX)	Luxembourg	s.t.
4	Adolfo Leoni (ITA)	Italy Cadets	+ 11' 09"
5	Gino Sciardis (FRA)	France – West	s.t.
6	Ferdinand Kübler (SUI)	Switzerland	s.t.
7	Alfredo Pasotti (ITA)	Italy Cadets	s.t.
8	Stan Ockers (BEL)	Belgium	s.t.
9	Dominique Forlini (FRA)	France – Paris	s.t.
10	Roger Lambrecht (BEL)	Belgium	s.t.

General classification after stage 10

Rank	Rider	Team	Time
1	Bernard Gauthier (FRA)	France – South-East	65h 43' 27"
2	Attilio Redolfi (FRA)	France – Île-de-France/North-East	+ 9' 20"
3	Jean Goldschmit (LUX)	Luxembourg	+ 10' 35"
4	Pierre Brambilla (FRA)	France – South-East	+ 11' 23"
5	Ferdinand Kübler (SUI)	Switzerland	+ 11' 24"
6	Fiorenzo Magni (ITA)	Italy	+ 11' 27"
7	Hilaire Couvreur (BEL)	Belgium	+ 13' 08"
8	Roger Lambrecht (BEL)	Belgium	+ 13' 46"
9	Briek Schotte (BEL)	Belgium	+ 14' 27"
10	Raphaël Géminiani (FRA)	France	+ 14' 52"

== Rest Day 2 ==
24 July 1950 - Pau

== Stage 11 ==
25 July 1950 - Pau to Saint-Gaudens, 230 km (140 mi)

Stage 11 result

Rank	Rider	Team	Time
1	Gino Bartali (ITA)	Italy	7h 28' 17"
2	Louison Bobet (FRA)	France	s.t.
3	Stan Ockers (BEL)	Belgium	s.t.
4	Raphaël Géminiani (FRA)	France	s.t.
5	André Brulé (FRA)	France – Île-de-France/North-East	s.t.
6	Jeng Kirchen (LUX)	Luxembourg	s.t.
7	Kléber Piot (FRA)	France – Île-de-France/North-East	s.t.
8	Pierre Cogan (FRA)	France – Centre/South-West	s.t.
9	Fiorenzo Magni (ITA)	Italy	s.t.
10	Marcel De Mulder (BEL)	Belgium Eaglets	+ 2' 54"

General classification after stage 11

Rank	Rider	Team	Time
1	Fiorenzo Magni (ITA)	Italy	73h 23' 11"
2	Ferdinand Kübler (SUI)	Switzerland	+ 2' 31"
3	Louison Bobet (FRA)	France	+ 3' 20"
4	Raphaël Géminiani (FRA)	France	+ 3' 25"
5	Stan Ockers (BEL)	Belgium	+ 3' 37"
6	Gino Bartali (ITA)	Italy	+ 4' 17"
7	Kléber Piot (FRA)	France – Île-de-France/North-East	+ 4' 20"
8	Jeng Kirchen (LUX)	Luxembourg	+ 5' 14"
9	Attilio Redolfi (FRA)	France – Île-de-France/North-East	+ 8' 07"
10	Jean Goldschmit (LUX)	Luxembourg	+ 9' 22"
