= 1950 Tour de France, Stage 12 to Stage 22 =

Cycling race stages

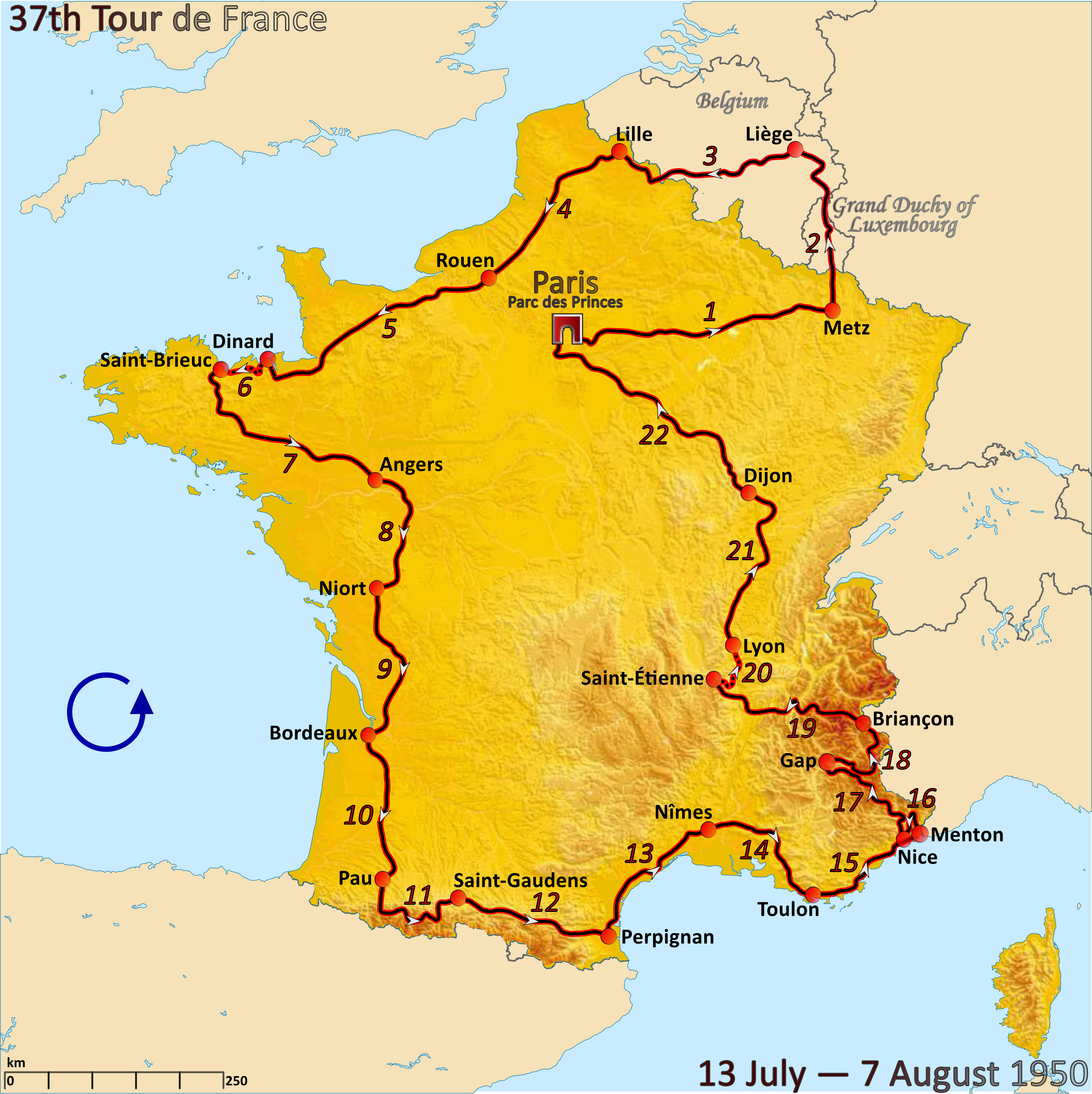
Route of the 1950 Tour de France

The 1950 Tour de France was the 37th edition of Tour de France, one of cycling's Grand Tours. The Tour began in Paris with a flat stage on 13 July and Stage 12 occurred on 26 July with a flat stage from Saint-Gaudens. The race finished in Paris on 7 August.

== Stage 12 ==
26 July 1950 - Saint-Gaudens to Perpignan, 233 km (144.8 mi)

Stage 12 result

Rank	Rider	Team	Time
1	Maurice Blomme (BEL)	Belgium	6h 29' 13"
2	Jean Baldassari (FRA)	France – Paris	+ 7' 09"
3	Dominique Forlini (FRA)	France – Paris	+ 13' 29"
4	Gilbert Bauvin (FRA)	France – Île-de-France/North-East	+ 15' 23"
5	Abdel-Kader Zaaf (FRA)	North Africa	+ 16' 02"
6	Custodio Dos Reis (FRA)	North Africa	+ 16' 03"
7	Georges Meunier (FRA)	France – Centre/South-West	s.t.
8	Alain Moineau (FRA)	France – Centre/South-West	s.t.
9	Jeng Kirchen (LUX)	Luxembourg	s.t.
10	Robert Castelin (FRA)	France – South-East	s.t.

General classification after stage 12

Rank	Rider	Team	Time
1	Ferdinand Kübler (SUI)	Switzerland	80h 11' 35"
2	Louison Bobet (FRA)	France	+ 49"
3	Raphaël Géminiani (FRA)	France	+ 54"
4	Stan Ockers (BEL)	Belgium	+ 1' 06"
5	Kléber Piot (FRA)	France – Île-de-France/North-East	+ 1' 49"
6	Jeng Kirchen (LUX)	Luxembourg	+ 2' 43"
7	Attilio Redolfi (FRA)	France – Île-de-France/North-East	+ 5' 36"
8	Jean Goldschmit (LUX)	Luxembourg	+ 6' 51"
9	Pierre Brambilla (FRA)	France – South-East	s.t.
10	Bernard Gauthier (FRA)	France – South-East	+ 7' 18"

== Stage 13 ==
27 July 1950 - Perpignan to Nîmes, 215 km (134 mi)

Stage 13 result

Rank	Rider	Team	Time
1	Marcel Molinès (FRA)	North Africa	6h 22' 56"
2	Georges Meunier (FRA)	France – Centre/South-West	+ 4' 01"
3	Stan Ockers (BEL)	Belgium	+ 4' 26"
4	Ferdinand Kübler (SUI)	Switzerland	s.t.
5	Marcel Hendrickx (BEL)	Belgium	s.t.
6	Wim De Ruyter (NED)	Netherlands	+ 4' 48"
7	Gino Sciardis (FRA)	France – West	+ 6' 36"
8	André Brulé (FRA)	France – Île-de-France/North-East	s.t.
9	Marcel Verschueren (BEL)	Belgium Eaglets	s.t.
10	Pierre Cogan (FRA)	France – Centre/South-West	s.t.

General classification after stage 13

Rank	Rider	Team	Time
1	Ferdinand Kübler (SUI)	Switzerland	86h 38' 57"
2	Stan Ockers (BEL)	Belgium	+ 1' 06"
3	Pierre Brambilla (FRA)	France – South-East	+ 9' 01"
4	Louison Bobet (FRA)	France	+ 10' 58"
5	Raphaël Géminiani (FRA)	France	+ 11' 03"
6	Jean Robic (FRA)	France – West	+ 11' 28"
7	Kléber Piot (FRA)	France – Île-de-France/North-East	+ 11' 58"
8	Pierre Cogan (FRA)	France – Centre/South-West	s.t.
9	Jeng Kirchen (LUX)	Luxembourg	+ 12' 52"
10	Georges Meunier (FRA)	France – Centre/South-West	+ 14' 11"

== Stage 14 ==
28 July 1950 - Nîmes to Toulon, 222 km (138 mi)

Stage 14 result

Rank	Rider	Team	Time
1	Custodio Dos Reis (FRA)	North Africa	6h 49' 54"
2	Marcel Zelasco (FRA)	North Africa	s.t.
3	Robert Castelin (FRA)	France – South-East	+ 14' 01"
4	Raoul Rémy (FRA)	France – South-East	s.t.
5	Robert Desbats (FRA)	France	+ 20' 51"
6	Stan Ockers (BEL)	Belgium	s.t.
7	Dominique Forlini (FRA)	France – Paris	s.t.
8	Émile Baffert (FRA)	France	s.t.
9	Marcel Verschueren (BEL)	Belgium Eaglets	s.t.
10	Hervé Prouzet (FRA)	France – Centre/South-West	s.t.

General classification after stage 14

Rank	Rider	Team	Time
1	Ferdinand Kübler (SUI)	Switzerland	93h 49' 42"
2	Stan Ockers (BEL)	Belgium	+ 1' 06"
3	Pierre Brambilla (FRA)	France – South-East	+ 9' 01"
4	Louison Bobet (FRA)	France	+ 10' 58"
5	Raphaël Géminiani (FRA)	France	+ 11' 03"
6	Jean Robic (FRA)	France – West	+ 11' 28"
7	Kléber Piot (FRA)	France – Île-de-France/North-East	+ 11' 58"
8	Pierre Cogan (FRA)	France – Centre/South-West	s.t.
9	Jeng Kirchen (LUX)	Luxembourg	+ 12' 52"
10	Georges Meunier (FRA)	France – Centre/South-West	+ 14' 11"

== Stage 15 ==
29 July 1950 - Toulon to Menton, 205.5 km (127.7 mi)

Stage 15 result

Rank	Rider	Team	Time
1	Bim Diederich (LUX)	Luxembourg	6h 45' 23"
2	Robert Castelin (FRA)	France – South-East	+ 1' 24"
3	Pierre Molinéris (FRA)	France	+ 1' 26"
4	Raymond Impanis (BEL)	Belgium	+ 2' 09"
5	Nello Lauredi (FRA)	France	s.t.
6	Gilbert Bauvin (FRA)	France – Île-de-France/North-East	+ 3' 49"
7	Jean-Marie Goasmat (FRA)	France – West	+ 4' 20"
8	Jean Baldassari (FRA)	France – Paris	+ 5' 03"
9	Georges Meunier (FRA)	France – Centre/South-West	+ 5' 04"
10	Stan Ockers (BEL)	Belgium	s.t.

General classification after stage 15

Rank	Rider	Team	Time
1	Ferdinand Kübler (SUI)	Switzerland	100h 40' 09"
2	Stan Ockers (BEL)	Belgium	+ 1' 06"
3	Pierre Brambilla (FRA)	France – South-East	+ 9' 01"
4	Louison Bobet (FRA)	France	+ 10' 58"
5	Raphaël Géminiani (FRA)	France	+ 11' 03"
6	Jean Robic (FRA)	France – West	+ 11' 28"
7	Pierre Cogan (FRA)	France – Centre/South-West	+ 11' 58"
8	Bim Diederich (LUX)	Luxembourg	+ 12' 42"
9	Jeng Kirchen (LUX)	Luxembourg	+ 12' 52"
10	Kléber Piot (FRA)	France – Île-de-France/North-East	+ 13' 26"

== Stage 16 ==
30 July 1950 - Menton to Nice, 96 km (60 mi)

Stage 16 result

Rank	Rider	Team	Time
1	Ferdinand Kübler (SUI)	Switzerland	3h 02' 43"
2	Louison Bobet (FRA)	France	s.t.
3	Stan Ockers (BEL)	Belgium	s.t.
4	Jean Robic (FRA)	France – West	s.t.
5	Pierre Molinéris (FRA)	France	+ 4' 11"
6	Kléber Piot (FRA)	France – Île-de-France/North-East	s.t.
7	André Brulé (FRA)	France – Île-de-France/North-East	s.t.
8	Pierre Cogan (FRA)	France – Centre/South-West	+ 5' 19"
9	Jeng Kirchen (LUX)	Luxembourg	s.t.
10	Jean Goldschmit (LUX)	Luxembourg	s.t.

General classification after stage 16

Rank	Rider	Team	Time
1	Ferdinand Kübler (SUI)	Switzerland	103h 41' 52"
2	Stan Ockers (BEL)	Belgium	+ 2' 06"
3	Louison Bobet (FRA)	France	+ 11' 08"
4	Jean Robic (FRA)	France – West	+ 11' 48"
5	Raphaël Géminiani (FRA)	France	+ 17' 22"
6	Pierre Cogan (FRA)	France – Centre/South-West	+ 18' 17"
7	Kléber Piot (FRA)	France – Île-de-France/North-East	+ 18' 37"
8	Jeng Kirchen (LUX)	Luxembourg	+ 19' 11"
9	Pierre Brambilla (FRA)	France – South-East	+ 19' 39"
10	Bim Diederich (LUX)	Luxembourg	+ 20' 41"

== Rest Day 3 ==
31 July 1950 - Nice

== Stage 17 ==
1 August 1950 - Nice to Gap, 229 km (142 mi)

Stage 17 result

Rank	Rider	Team	Time
1	Raphaël Géminiani (FRA)	France	7h 58' 31"
2	Georges Meunier (FRA)	France – Centre/South-West	s.t.
3	Bim Diederich (LUX)	Luxembourg	s.t.
4	Pierre Brambilla (FRA)	France – South-East	s.t.
5	Stan Ockers (BEL)	Belgium	s.t.
6	Jean Baldassari (FRA)	France – Paris	s.t.
7	Paul Giguet (FRA)	France	s.t.
8	Serge Blusson (FRA)	France – Paris	s.t.
9	Maurice Kallert (FRA)	France – South-East	s.t.
10	Marcel Verschueren (BEL)	Belgium Eaglets	s.t.

General classification after stage 17

Rank	Rider	Team	Time
1	Ferdinand Kübler (SUI)	Switzerland	111h 42' 07"
2	Stan Ockers (BEL)	Belgium	+ 2' 06"
3	Louison Bobet (FRA)	France	+ 11' 08"
4	Jean Robic (FRA)	France – West	+ 11' 28"
5	Raphaël Géminiani (FRA)	France	+ 14' 38"
6	Pierre Cogan (FRA)	France – Centre/South-West	+ 18' 17"
7	Kléber Piot (FRA)	France – Île-de-France/North-East	+ 18' 37"
8	Pierre Brambilla (FRA)	France – South-East	+ 18' 58"
9	Jeng Kirchen (LUX)	Luxembourg	+ 19' 11"
10	Bim Diederich (LUX)	Luxembourg	+ 20' 00"

== Stage 18 ==
2 August 1950 - Gap to Briançon, 165 km (103 mi)

Stage 18 result

Rank	Rider	Team	Time
1	Louison Bobet (FRA)	France	6h 09' 20"
2	Ferdinand Kübler (SUI)	Switzerland	+ 2' 52"
3	Stan Ockers (BEL)	Belgium	s.t.
4	Raymond Impanis (BEL)	Belgium	+ 3' 15"
5	André Brulé (FRA)	France – Île-de-France/North-East	+ 5' 11"
6	Armand Baeyens (BEL)	Belgium Eaglets	+ 6' 16"
7	Marcel De Mulder (BEL)	Belgium Eaglets	+ 7' 18"
8	Jean Robic (FRA)	France – West	+ 7' 27"
9	Pierre Brambilla (FRA)	France – South-East	+ 7' 33"
10	Jeng Kirchen (LUX)	Luxembourg	+ 7' 38"

General classification after stage 18

Rank	Rider	Team	Time
1	Ferdinand Kübler (SUI)	Switzerland	117h 53' 29"
2	Stan Ockers (BEL)	Belgium	+ 2' 56"
3	Louison Bobet (FRA)	France	+ 6' 46"
4	Jean Robic (FRA)	France – West	+ 16' 53"
5	Raphaël Géminiani (FRA)	France	+ 21' 24"
6	Pierre Brambilla (FRA)	France – South-East	+ 24' 29"
7	Jeng Kirchen (LUX)	Luxembourg	+ 24' 47"
8	Kléber Piot (FRA)	France – Île-de-France/North-East	+ 26' 12"
9	Pierre Cogan (FRA)	France – Centre/South-West	+ 29' 02"
10	Marcel De Mulder (BEL)	Belgium Eaglets	+ 29' 53"

== Stage 19 ==
3 August 1950 - Briançon to Saint-Étienne, 291 km (181 mi)

Stage 19 result

Rank	Rider	Team	Time
1	Raphaël Géminiani (FRA)	France	8h 49' 11"
2	Ferdinand Kübler (SUI)	Switzerland	+ 34"
3	Stan Ockers (BEL)	Belgium	s.t.
4	Raymond Impanis (BEL)	Belgium	s.t.
5	Kléber Piot (FRA)	France – Île-de-France/North-East	s.t.
6	Jeng Kirchen (LUX)	Luxembourg	s.t.
7	Georges Meunier (FRA)	France – Centre/South-West	+ 1' 51"
8	Willy Kemp (LUX)	Luxembourg	+ 2' 11"
9	Marcel Verschueren (BEL)	Belgium Eaglets	+ 5' 52"
10	Bernard Gauthier (FRA)	France – South-East	s.t.

General classification after stage 19

Rank	Rider	Team	Time
1	Ferdinand Kübler (SUI)	Switzerland	126h 42' 44"
2	Stan Ockers (BEL)	Belgium	+ 3' 26"
3	Louison Bobet (FRA)	France	+ 12' 34"
4	Raphaël Géminiani (FRA)	France	+ 20' 20"
5	Jeng Kirchen (LUX)	Luxembourg	+ 25' 17"
6	Kléber Piot (FRA)	France – Île-de-France/North-East	+ 26' 42"
7	Jean Robic (FRA)	France – West	+ 36' 57"
8	Pierre Brambilla (FRA)	France – South-East	+ 41' 39"
9	Georges Meunier (FRA)	France – Centre/South-West	+ 42' 14"
10	Raymond Impanis (BEL)	Belgium	+ 43' 54"

== Rest Day 4 ==
4 August 1950 - Saint-Étienne

== Stage 20 ==
5 August 1950 - Saint-Étienne to Lyon, 98 km (61 mi) (ITT)

Stage 20 result

Rank	Rider	Team	Time
1	Ferdinand Kübler (SUI)	Switzerland	2h 29' 35"
2	Stan Ockers (BEL)	Belgium	+ 5' 34"
3	Jean Goldschmit (LUX)	Luxembourg	+ 6' 44"
4	Jeng Kirchen (LUX)	Luxembourg	+ 8' 04"
5	Raymond Impanis (BEL)	Belgium	+ 8' 40"
6	Louison Bobet (FRA)	France	+ 8' 45"
7	Roger Lambrecht (BEL)	Belgium	+ 8' 51"
8	Raphaël Géminiani (FRA)	France	+ 9' 54"
9	Marcel Hendrickx (BEL)	Belgium	+ 10' 00"
10	Pierre Cogan (FRA)	France – Centre/South-West	+ 10' 06"

General classification after stage 20

Rank	Rider	Team	Time
1	Ferdinand Kübler (SUI)	Switzerland	129h 11' 19"
2	Stan Ockers (BEL)	Belgium	+ 9' 30"
3	Louison Bobet (FRA)	France	+ 22' 19"
4	Raphaël Géminiani (FRA)	France	+ 31' 14"
5	Jeng Kirchen (LUX)	Luxembourg	+ 34' 21"
6	Kléber Piot (FRA)	France – Île-de-France/North-East	+ 41' 35"
7	Raymond Impanis (BEL)	Belgium	+ 53' 34"
8	Georges Meunier (FRA)	France – Centre/South-West	+ 54' 29"
9	Pierre Brambilla (FRA)	France – South-East	+ 57' 14"
10	Pierre Cogan (FRA)	France – Centre/South-West	+ 57' 15"

== Stage 21 ==
6 August 1950 - Lyon to Dijon, 233 km (145 mi)

Stage 21 result

Rank	Rider	Team	Time
1	Gino Sciardis (FRA)	France – West	6h 42' 38"
2	Émile Baffert (FRA)	France	s.t.
3	Raoul Rémy (FRA)	France – South-East	s.t.
4	Paul Giguet (FRA)	France	s.t.
5	Gilbert Bauvin (FRA)	France – Île-de-France/North-East	s.t.
6	Roger Lambrecht (BEL)	Belgium	s.t.
7	Jean Goldschmit (LUX)	Luxembourg	s.t.
8	Pierre Cogan (FRA)	France – Centre/South-West	s.t.
9	Marcel Hendrickx (BEL)	Belgium	s.t.
10	Serge Blusson (FRA)	France – Paris	+ 4' 36"

General classification after stage 21

Rank	Rider	Team	Time
1	Ferdinand Kübler (SUI)	Switzerland	135h 58' 50"
2	Stan Ockers (BEL)	Belgium	+ 9' 30"
3	Louison Bobet (FRA)	France	+ 22' 19"
4	Raphaël Géminiani (FRA)	France	+ 31' 14"
5	Jeng Kirchen (LUX)	Luxembourg	+ 34' 21"
6	Kléber Piot (FRA)	France – Île-de-France/North-East	+ 41' 35"
7	Pierre Cogan (FRA)	France – Centre/South-West	+ 52' 22"
8	Raymond Impanis (BEL)	Belgium	+ 53' 34"
9	Georges Meunier (FRA)	France – Centre/South-West	+ 54' 29"
10	Jean Goldschmit (LUX)	Luxembourg	+ 55' 21"

== Stage 22 ==
7 August 1950 - Dijon to Paris, 314 km (195 mi)

Stage 22 result

Rank	Rider	Team	Time
1	Émile Baffert (FRA)	France	9h 36' 12"
2	Marcel Hendrickx (BEL)	Belgium	s.t.
3	Pierre Molinéris (FRA)	France	s.t.
4	André Brulé (FRA)	France – Île-de-France/North-East	s.t.
5	Robert Bonnaventure (FRA)	France – West	s.t.
6	Fritz Zbinden (SUI)	Switzerland	s.t.
7	Bim Diederich (LUX)	Luxembourg	s.t.
8	Serge Blusson (FRA)	France – Paris	+ 19"
9	Jean Baldassari (FRA)	France – Paris	s.t.
10	Robert Desbats (FRA)	France	s.t.

General classification after stage 22

Rank	Rider	Team	Time
1	Ferdinand Kübler (SUI)	Switzerland	145h 36' 56"
2	Stan Ockers (BEL)	Belgium	+ 9' 30"
3	Louison Bobet (FRA)	France	+ 22' 19"
4	Raphaël Géminiani (FRA)	France	+ 31' 14"
5	Jeng Kirchen (LUX)	Luxembourg	+ 34' 21"
6	Kléber Piot (FRA)	France – Île-de-France/North-East	+ 41' 35"
7	Pierre Cogan (FRA)	France – Centre/South-West	+ 52' 22"
8	Raymond Impanis (BEL)	Belgium	+ 53' 34"
9	Georges Meunier (FRA)	France – Centre/South-West	+ 54' 29"
10	Jean Goldschmit (LUX)	Luxembourg	+ 55' 21"
