= List of teams and cyclists in the 1953 Tour de France =

List of cyclists

As was the custom since 1930, the 1953 Tour de France was contested by national and regional teams. Seven national teams were sent, with 10 cyclists each from Italy, Switzerland, Belgium, Spain, Luxembourg, the Netherlands and France. France additionally sent five regional teams of 10 cyclists each, divided into Ile de France, Center-North East France, South East France, West France and South West France. One Luxembourgian cyclist did not start, so 119 cyclists started the race.

The winner of the previous edition, Fausto Coppi, did not defend his title, apparently due to injury. The reasons were not clear: it could have been injury, but it was also possible that Coppi did not want to ride in the same team as his rival Gino Bartali, or that the Tour direction urged the Italian team not to select Coppi because he had dominated the 1952 Tour, or that Coppi chose to prepare for the 1953 UCI Road World Championships. The big favourites became Hugo Koblet and Louison Bobet.

The last five editions had been won by Italian and Swiss cyclists, so the French cycling fans were anxious for a French win. When team manager Michel Bidot had selected Bobet as the French team captain, controversy arose. Bobet had shown his potential strength, but had already tried to win the Tour de France five times without succeeding. His teammate Raphaël Géminiani thought that Bobet was not strong enough, after he did not finish the 1953 Giro d'Italia earlier that year.

== Start list ==
=== By team ===
Italy
No.	Rider	Pos.
1	Giancarlo Astrua (ITA)	3
2	Mario Baroni (ITA)	53
3	Gino Bartali (ITA)	11
4	Giovanni Corrieri (ITA)	56
5	Umberto Drei (ITA)	54
6	Adolfo Grosso (ITA)	DNF
7	Livio Isotti (ITA)	42
8	Fiorenzo Magni (ITA)	15
9	Giuseppe Minardi (ITA)	DNF
10	Vincenzo Rossello (ITA)	22

Switzerland
No.	Rider	Pos.
11	François Chevalley (SUI)	DNF
12	Emilio Croci-Torti (SUI)	DNF
13	Carlo Lafranchi (SUI)	61
14	Marcel Huber (SUI)	32
15	Hugo Koblet (SUI)	DNF
16	Martin Metzger (SUI)	68
17	Remo Pianezzi (SUI)	57
18	Otto Meili (SUI)	DNF
19	Fritz Schär (SUI)	6
20	Max Schellenberg (SUI)	67

Belgium
No.	Rider	Pos.
21	Jan Adriaensens (BEL)	45
22	Alex Close (BEL)	4
23	Hilaire Couvreur (BEL)	28
24	Alfred De Bruyne (BEL)	52
25	Alois De Hertog (BEL)	DNF
26	René De Smet (BEL)	43
27	Raymond Impanis (BEL)	23
28	Robert Vanderstockt (BEL)	DNF
29	Martin Van Geneugden (BEL)	34
30	Richard Van Genechten (BEL)	33

Spain
No.	Rider	Pos.
31	Victorio García (ESP)	DNF
32	José Gil (ESP)	DNF
33	Antonio Gelabert (ESP)	48
34	Vicente Iturat (ESP)	DNF
35	Jesús Loroño (ESP)	50
36	Francisco Masip (ESP)	46
37	Dalmacio Langarica (ESP)	73
38	José Serra Gil (ESP)	14
39	Andrés Trobat (ESP)	24
40	José Vidal-Porcar (ESP)	74

Luxembourg
No.	Rider	Pos.
41	Bim Diederich (LUX)	DNF
42	Marcel Dierkens (LUX)	DNF
43	Marcel Ernzer (LUX)	18
44	Charly Gaul (LUX)	DNF
45	Lucien Gillen (LUX)	DNS
46	Jean Goldschmit (LUX)	DNF
47	Edy Hein (LUX)	DNF
48	Willy Kemp (LUX)	66
49	Jim Kirchen (LUX)	DNF
50	Jean Schmit (LUX)	72

Netherlands
No.	Rider	Pos.
51	Sjefke Janssen (NED)	DNF
52	Jan Nolten (NED)	19
53	Thijs Roks (NED)	29
54	Henk Steevens (NED)	DNF
55	Adri Suykerbuyk (NED)	40
56	Hein Van Breenen (NED)	36
57	Wim van Est (NED)	13
58	Wout Wagtmans (NED)	5
59	Adrie Voorting (NED)	DNF
60	Gerrit Voorting (NED)	17

France
No.	Rider	Pos.
61	Louison Bobet (FRA)	1
62	Adolphe Deledda (FRA)	35
63	Jean Dotto (FRA)	DNF
64	Bernard Gauthier (FRA)	75
65	Raphaël Géminiani (FRA)	9
66	Nello Lauredi (FRA)	8
67	Jean Le Guilly (FRA)	30
68	Raoul Rémy (FRA)	51
69	Antonin Rolland (FRA)	7
70	Lucien Teisseire (FRA)	26

France - Île-de-France
No.	Rider	Pos.
71	Stanislas Bober (FRA)	25
72	Louis Caput (FRA)	DNF
73	Maurice Diot (FRA)	60
74	Jean Guéguen (FRA)	DNF
75	Maurice Quentin (FRA)	31
76	Attilio Redolfi (FRA)	DNF
77	Jacques Renaud (FRA)	41
78	Claude Rouer (FRA)	76
79	Eugène Telotte (FRA)	DNF
80	Alfred Tonello (FRA)	49

France - North-East/Centre
No.	Rider	Pos.
81	Ugo Anzile (FRA)	20
82	Gilbert Bauvin (FRA)	16
83	Guy Buchaille (FRA)	DNF
84	Jean Dacquay (FRA)	55
85	Jean Forestier (FRA)	39
86	Roger Hassenforder (FRA)	DNF
87	Jacques Labertonnière (FRA)	DNF
88	Georges Meunier (FRA)	27
89	Bernard Quennehen (FRA)	64
90	Roger Walkowiak (FRA)	47

France - South East
No.	Rider	Pos.
91	Émile Baffert (FRA)	DNF
92	Ahmed Kebaïli (FRA)	DNF
93	Lucien Lazaridès (FRA)	21
94	Siro Bianchi (FRA)	69
95	Joseph Mirando (FRA)	12
96	Pierre Molinéris (FRA)	38
97	René Privat (FRA)	DNF
98	René Rotta (FRA)	63
99	Vincent Vitetta (FRA)	59
100	Marcel Zelasco (FRA)	DNF

France - West
No.	Rider	Pos.
101	Armand Audaire (FRA)	65
102	Roger Chupin (FRA)	DNF
103	Norbert Esnault (FRA)	71
104	Émile Guérinel (FRA)	DNF
105	François Mahé (FRA)	10
106	Jean Malléjac (FRA)	2
107	Bernard Bultel (FRA)	70
108	Joseph Morvan (FRA)	62
109	Roger Pontet (FRA)	44
110	Jean Robic (FRA)	DNF

France - South-West
No.	Rider	Pos.
111	Louis Barès (FRA)	DNF
112	Hubert Bastianelli (FRA)	DNF
113	Claude Colette (FRA)	58
114	André Darrigade (FRA)	37
115	Robert Desbats (FRA)	DNF
116	Jacques Dupont (FRA)	DNF
117	Henri Paret (FRA)	DNF
118	Hervé Prouzet (FRA)	DNF
119	Tino Sabbadini (FRA)	DNF
120	Jacques Vivier (FRA)	DNF

=== By rider ===
Legend
No.	Starting number worn by the rider during the Tour
Pos.	Position in the general classification
DNF	Denotes a rider who did not finish

No.	Name	Nationality	Team	Pos.	Ref
1	Giancarlo Astrua	Italy	Italy	3	
2	Mario Baroni	Italy	Italy	53	
3	Gino Bartali	Italy	Italy	11	
4	Giovanni Corrieri	Italy	Italy	56	
5	Umberto Drei	Italy	Italy	54	
6	Adolpho Grosso	Italy	Italy	DNF	
7	Livio Isotti	Italy	Italy	42	
8	Fiorenzo Magni	Italy	Italy	15	
9	Rossello Minardi	Italy	Italy	DNF	
10	Vincenzo Rossello	Italy	Italy	22	
11	François Chevalley	Switzerland	Switzerland	DNF	
12	Emilio Croci-Torti	Switzerland	Switzerland	DNF	
13	Carlo Lafranchi	Switzerland	Switzerland	61	
14	Marcel Huber	Switzerland	Switzerland	32	
15	Hugo Koblet	Switzerland	Switzerland	DNF	
16	Martin Metzger	Switzerland	Switzerland	68	
17	Remo Pianezzi	Switzerland	Switzerland	57	
18	Otto Meili	Switzerland	Switzerland	DNF	
19	Fritz Schär	Switzerland	Switzerland	6	
20	Max Schellenberg	Switzerland	Switzerland	67	
21	Jan Adriaensens	Belgium	Belgium	45	
22	Alex Close	Belgium	Belgium	4	
23	Hilaire Couvreur	Belgium	Belgium	28	
24	Alfred De Bruyne	Belgium	Belgium	52	
25	Alois De Hertog	Belgium	Belgium	DNF	
26	René De Smet	Belgium	Belgium	43	
27	Raymond Impanis	Belgium	Belgium	23	
28	Robert Vanderstockt	Belgium	Belgium	DNF	
29	Martin Van Geneugden	Belgium	Belgium	34	
30	Richard Van Genechten	Belgium	Belgium	33	
31	Victorio García	Spain	Spain	DNF	
32	José Gil	Spain	Spain	DNF	
33	Antonio Gelabert	Spain	Spain	48	
34	Vicente Iturat	Spain	Spain	DNF	
35	Jesús Loroño	Spain	Spain	50	
36	Francisco Masip	Spain	Spain	46	
37	Dalmacio Langarica	Spain	Spain	73	
38	José Serra Gil	Spain	Spain	14	
39	Andrés Trobat	Spain	Spain	24	
40	José Vidal Porcar	Spain	Spain	74	
41	Bim Diederich	Luxembourg	Luxembourg	DNF	
42	Marcel Dierkens	Luxembourg	Luxembourg	DNF	
43	Marcel Ernzer	Luxembourg	Luxembourg	18	
44	Charly Gaul	Luxembourg	Luxembourg	DNF	
45	Lucien Gillen	Luxembourg	Luxembourg	DNS	
46	Jean Goldschmit	Luxembourg	Luxembourg	DNF	
47	Edy Hein	Luxembourg	Luxembourg	DNF	
48	Willy Kemp	Luxembourg	Luxembourg	66	
49	Jim Kirchen	Luxembourg	Luxembourg	DNF	
50	Jean Schmit	Luxembourg	Luxembourg	72	
51	Sjefke Janssen	Netherlands	Netherlands	DNF	
52	Jan Nolten	Netherlands	Netherlands	19	
53	Thijs Roks	Netherlands	Netherlands	29	
54	Henk Steevens	Netherlands	Netherlands	DNF	
55	Adri Suykerbuyk	Netherlands	Netherlands	40	
56	Hein Van Breenen	Netherlands	Netherlands	36	
57	Wim van Est	Netherlands	Netherlands	13	
58	Wout Wagtmans	Netherlands	Netherlands	5	
59	Adrie Voorting	Netherlands	Netherlands	DNF	
60	Gerrit Voorting	Netherlands	Netherlands	17	
61	Louison Bobet	France	France	1	
62	Adolphe Deledda	France	France	35	
63	Jean Dotto	France	France	DNF	
64	Bernard Gauthier	France	France	75	
65	Raphaël Géminiani	France	France	9	
66	Nello Lauredi	France	France	8	
67	Jean Le Guilly	France	France	30	
68	Raoul Rémy	France	France	51	
69	Antonin Rolland	France	France	7	
70	Lucien Teisseire	France	France	26	
71	Stanislas Bober	France	France - Île-de-France	25	
72	Louis Caput	France	France - Île-de-France	DNF	
73	Maurice Diot	France	France - Île-de-France	60	
74	Jean Guéguen	France	France - Île-de-France	DNF	
75	Maurice Quentin	France	France - Île-de-France	31	
76	Attilio Redolfi	France	France - Île-de-France	DNF	
77	Jacques Renaud	France	France - Île-de-France	41	
78	Claude Rouer	France	France - Île-de-France	76	
79	Eugène Telotte	France	France - Île-de-France	DNF	
80	Alfred Tonello	France	France - Île-de-France	49	
81	Ugo Anzile	France	France - North-East/Centre	20	
82	Gilbert Bauvin	France	France - North-East/Centre	16	
83	Guy Buchaille	France	France - North-East/Centre	DNF	
84	Jean Dacquay	France	France - North-East/Centre	55	
85	Jean Forestier	France	France - North-East/Centre	39	
86	Roger Hassenforder	France	France - North-East/Centre	DNF	
87	Jacques Labertonnière	France	France - North-East/Centre	DNF	
88	Georges Meunier	France	France - North-East/Centre	27	
89	Bernard Quennehen	France	France - North-East/Centre	64	
90	Roger Walkowiak	France	France - North-East/Centre	47	
91	Émile Baffert	France	France - South East	DNF	
92	Ahmed Kebaïli	France	France - South East	DNF	
93	Lucien Lazaridès	France	France - South East	21	
94	Siro Bianchi	France	France - South East	69	
95	Joseph Mirando	France	France - South East	12	
96	Pierre Molinéris	France	France - South East	38	
97	René Privat	France	France - South East	DNF	
98	René Rotta	France	France - South East	63	
99	Vincent Vitetta	France	France - South East	59	
100	Marcel Zelasco	France	France - South East	DNF	
101	Armand Audaire	France	France - West	65	
102	Roger Chupin	France	France - West	DNF	
103	Norbert Esnault	France	France - West	71	
104	Émile Guérinel	France	France - West	DNF	
105	François Mahé	France	France - West	10	
106	Jean Malléjac	France	France - West	2	
107	Bernard Bultel	France	France - West	70	
108	Joseph Morvan	France	France - West	62	
109	Roger Pontet	France	France - West	44	
110	Jean Robic	France	France - West	DNF	
111	Louis Barès	France	France - South-West	DNF	
112	Hubert Bastianelli	France	France - South-West	DNF	
113	Claude Colette	France	France - South-West	58	
114	André Darrigade	France	France - South-West	37	
115	Robert Desbats	France	France - South-West	DNF	
116	Jacques Dupont	France	France - South-West	DNF	
117	Henri Paret	France	France - South-West	DNF	
118	Hervé Prouzet	France	France - South-West	DNF	
119	Tino Sabbadini	France	France - South-West	DNF	
120	Jacques Vivier	France	France - South-West	DNF	
