= Bernard Fernandez =

Bernard Fernandez may refer to:

- Bernard Fernandez (baseball)
- Bernard Fernandez (cyclist)
- Bernard Fernandez (journalist)
