= Baffert =

Baffert is a surname. Notable people with the surname include:

- Bob Baffert (born 1953), American racehorse trainer
- Émile Baffert (1924–2017), French road bicycle racer
