= Tacca (disambiguation) =

Tacca may refer to:

== People ==
- Ferdinando Tacca (1619-1686) Italian architect
- Giuseppe Tacca (1917-1984) Italian-French pro-cyclist
- Pierre Tacca, French pro-cyclist, see List of teams and cyclists in the 1950 Tour de France
- Pietro Tacca (1577-1640) Italian sculptor

== Other uses ==
- Tacca, a genus of flowering plants, including batflowers and arrowroot
- TACCA, a type of U.S. Army bandolier, see List of U.S. Army munitions by supply catalog designation
- Tacca Musique (Tacca), a Canadian record label, part of Aquarius Records (Canada)

== See also ==
- Taqa (disambiguation)
- Taka (disambiguation)
- TACA (disambiguation)
