= Basile Decortès =

French cyclist

Personal information
- Born: 6 December 1921
- Died: 30 October 2011 (aged 89)

Cycling career
- Sport: Cycling
- Role: Rider

Basile Decortès (6 December 1921 – 30 October 2011) was a French racing cyclist. He rode in the 1950 Tour de France.
