= Max Charroin =

French cyclist

Personal information
- Born: 22 December 1924
- Died: 30 March 2007 (aged 82)

Cycling career
- Sport: Cycling
- Role: Rider

Max Charroin (22 December 1924 – 30 March 2007) was a French racing cyclist. He rode in the 1950 Tour de France.
