= Taka (given name) =

Taka is a Japanese given name. People with the name include:

- Taka Aono, racecar driver
- Taka Higashino (born 1985) Japanese freestyle motocross rider
- Taka Hirose (born 1967), bassist of the rock band Feeder
- Taka Kato (born 1959), pornographic film actor
- Taka Michinoku (born 1973), wrestler
- Taka as the stage name of Takahiro Moriuchi (born 1988), rock singer of One Ok Rock.
- Taka Perry (born 1998) Australian-Japanese record producer, songwriter and artist
- Taka Shibata (1916–1991) Japanese sprinter
- Taka as the stage name of Takahiro Suzuki (born 1976), member of the comedian duo Taka and Toshi.

== Fictional Characters ==
- Taka-Arashi, A sumo wrestler from Virtua Fighter
- Taka Silasakti Subrata, a HR manager of a fictional Indonesian Television station OKTV from situation comedy OB.
- Taka Kamitani (狼谷 鷹), a character from the manga and anime School Babysitters and the younger brother of Hayato Kamitani

== See also ==
- Taka (disambiguation)
