= René Berton =

French cyclist

Personal information
- Born: 14 October 1924
- Died: 17 December 2006 (aged 82)

Cycling career
- Sport: Cycling
- Role: Rider

René Berton (14 October 1924 – 17 December 2006) was a French racing cyclist. He rode in the 1950 Tour de France.
