= Frans Vos =

Dutch cyclist

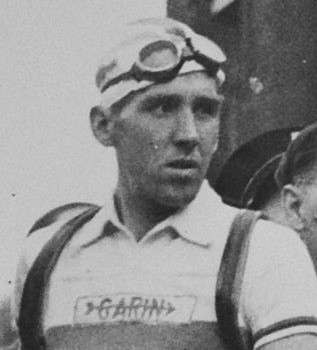
- Vos in 1950

Personal information
- Born: 22 February 1925
- Died: 14 April 2001 (aged 76)

Cycling career
- Sport: Cycling
- Role: Rider

Frans Vos (22 February 1925 – 14 April 2001) was a Dutch racing cyclist. He rode in the 1950 Tour de France.
