= Taqa =

Taqa or TAQA may refer to:

- Taqa, Iran, a village in Khuzestan Province, Iran
- Taqah, town in Oman
- Abu Dhabi National Energy Company (TAQA)
- Training, Assessment and Quality Assurance (TAQA) in relation to adult, further and work-based educational assessment (in the UK)
- Taqa or Taga (Mandaeism), ritual crown in Mandaeism

== See also ==
- Taka (disambiguation)
- TACA (disambiguation)
- Tacca (disambiguation)
