= Antoine Frankowski =

French cyclist

Personal information
- Born: 9 March 1926
- Died: 21 August 1993 (aged 67)

Cycling career
- Sport: Cycling
- Role: Rider

Antoine Frankowski (9 March 1926 – 21 August 1993) was a French racing cyclist. He rode in the 1950 Tour de France.
