= TACA =

TACA may refer to:

- TACA International Airlines, a group of five Central American airlines
- The Autism Community in Action (formerly Talk About Curing Autism; same initialism)
- Turkish American Cultural Alliance

== See also ==
- Taqa (disambiguation)
- Taka (disambiguation)
- Tacca (disambiguation)
