= Taka (disambiguation) =

Taka refers to a unit of currency in Bengali language. In Bangladesh, taka refers to the Bangladeshi taka, which is the currency of Bangladesh. In India, in the Bengali language speaking states of West Bengal and Tripura, taka refers to Indian Rupee.

Taka may also refer to:

== People ==
- Taka (given name), a masculine Japanese given name

=== Nicknamed or pseudonym ===
- William Tucker (settler) (1784–1817), early settler in New Zealand, called Taka by Maori
- Takayuki Ishikawa, also known as DJ Taka, popular Bemani artist
- Takaaki Ishibashi (石橋 貴明; born 1961), Japanese artist nicknamed "Taka", "Taka-san", "Taka-chan"
- Takahiro Moriuchi (Japanese singer, born 1988) "Taka"
- Kazuko Takatsukasa (孝宮和子内親王, Taka-no-miya Kazuko Naishinnō; 1929-1989): Kazuko, Princess Taka

=== Surnamed ===
- Chazel Taka (1929–1974), Iraqi poet and politician
- Efraim Taka (born 1989), Israeli footballer; see List of Israeli football transfers summer 2014
- Iwao Taka (高 巌; born 1956), Japanese academic
- Jussi Taka (born 1993) Finnish snowboarder
- Taka Sisters (disbanded 1936), Japanese-American Vaudeville act comprising three sisters Taka: Myrtle (1916–2011), Midi (1914–1936), Mary (1912–1991)
- Miiko Taka (高美以子; 1925–2023), Japanese American actress
- Osman Taka (died 1887), Albanian dancer
- Seveci Taka (born 1981), Fijian rugby player
- Suzuka Taka (高 涼風; born 1996), Japanese ice hockey player
- Tony Taka (born 1971), Japanese mangaka and artist

=== Fictional characters ===
- Scar (The Lion King), known as "Taka" in the Disney Lion King Backstory
- Taka, a character in Ghost of Tsushima

== Places ==
- Taka, Hyōgo, a town in Taka District, Japan
- Taka District, Hyōgo, a county-level unit in Japan
- Mount Taka (Osaka/Hyōgo), a mountain in Japan
- Taka Island (Taka-shima), a Japanese island in the Kujūku Islands
- Taka Bonerate Islands, an archipelago in Indonesia
- Taka Atoll, a coral atoll in the Ratak Chain of the Marshall Islands
- Təkyə, a village in Azerbaijan
- Taka Mountains, a land formation in Sudan
- Lake Taka, a temporary lake in Greece
- Taka, a former name for the district around Kassala, Sudan, now Kassala; see Alodia

== Other uses ==
- Taka (film), a 2005 Bangladeshi drama film
- Taka (paper mache), Filipino paper mache
- Taka (boat), a traditional small boat used for carrying load or passengers, often built by Laz people of the Black Sea region
- Al-Taka SC, a Sudanese soccer club
- Taka, the term used in Bengali-speaking regions and sometimes in Maithili-speaking regions of India for Indian Rupee
- History of the taka, historical currencies so named

== See also ==
- Taqa (disambiguation)
- TACA (disambiguation)
- Tacca (disambiguation)
