= Armand Darnauguilhem =

French cyclist

Personal information
- Born: 9 February 1926
- Died: 9 May 1967 (aged 41)

Cycling career
- Sport: Cycling
- Role: Rider

Armand Darnauguilhem (9 February 1926 – 9 May 1967) was a French racing cyclist. He rode in the 1950 Tour de France.
