= Jean Garnault =

French sporting director and politician (1925–2023)

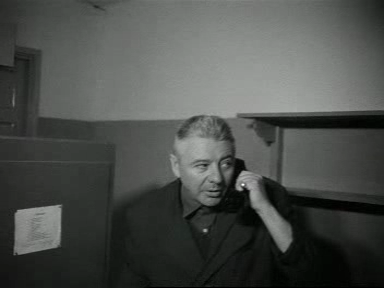
- Garnault in 1954

Mayor of Auxerre
- In office 5 April 1998 – 1 March 2001
- Preceded by: Jean-Pierre Soisson
- Succeeded by: Guy Férez

Tresurer of the French Football Federation

President of AJ Auxerre
- In office 1961–1963
- Succeeded by: Jean-Claude Hamel

Personal details
- Born: 1 July 1925 Paris, France
- Died: 5 December 2023 (aged 98)
- Party: RPR
- Occupation: Sporting director

Jean Garnault (1 July 1925 – 5 December 2023) was a French sporting director and politician of the Rally for the Republic (RPR).

Garnault served as Mayor of Auxerre from 1998 to 2001.

== Biography ==
Born in Paris on 1 July 1925, Garnault's family originally came from Noyers-sur-Serein before his father came to Paris for work. His family then moved to Auxerre, where he joined AJ Auxerre. There, he played football, basketball, and athletics. He succeeded Georges Heissat as head of the club's football department in 1958 and served as president from 1961 to 1963. He was then president of the Ligue de Bourgogne de football from 1967 to 1992. He also had a career with the French Football Federation, becoming treasurer in 1984. He was head of the French delegation at the 1986 FIFA World Cup and at the UEFA Euro 1992.

Alongside his career as a sporting director, Garnault was involved in politics. He was elected to the Municipal Council of Auxerre in 1965 along with Jean Moreau. In 1998, Jean-Pierre Soisson resigned as mayor to avoid serving a dual mandate. Garnault took over this position after being elected, and his term ended on 1 March 2003.

Jean Garnault died on 5 December 2023, at the age of 98.

== Decorations ==
- Officer of the Ordre national du Mérite (1983)
