= Bernard Fernandez (cyclist) =

French cyclist

Personal information
- Born: 16 March 1924
- Died: 6 December 2000 (aged 76)

Cycling career
- Sport: Cycling
- Role: Rider

Bernard Fernandez (16 March 1924 – 6 December 2000) was a French racing cyclist. He rode in the 1950 Tour de France.
