= Albert Dubuisson =

Belgian cyclist

Personal information
- Born: 28 October 1918
- Died: 21 February 1974 (aged 55)

Cycling career
- Sport: Cycling
- Role: Rider

Albert Dubuisson (28 October 1918 – 21 February 1974) was a Belgian racing cyclist. He rode in the 1950 Tour de France.
