= Edy Hein =

Luxembourgish cyclist (1929–2006)

Personal information
- Born: 11 August 1929
- Died: 31 July 2006 (aged 76)

Cycling career
- Sport: Cycling
- Role: Rider

Edy Hein (11 August 1929 – 31 July 2006) was a Luxembourgish racing cyclist. He rode in the 1953 Tour de France.
