= Louis Barès =

French cyclist (born 1930)

Personal information
- Born: 27 July 1930 (age 96)

Cycling career
- Sport: Cycling
- Role: Rider

Louis Barès (born 27 July 1930) is a French racing cyclist. He rode in the 1953 Tour de France.
