= Otto Meili =

Swiss cyclist

Personal information
- Born: 14 April 1929 Weisslingen, Switzerland

Cycling career
- Sport: Cycling
- Role: Rider

Otto Meili (born 14 April 1929) was a Swiss racing cyclist. He rode in the 1953 Tour de France.
