= Jacques Labertonnière =

French cyclist (1927–2019)

Personal information
- Born: 12 January 1927
- Died: 8 February 2019 (aged 92)

Cycling career
- Sport: Cycling
- Role: Rider

Jacques Labertonnière (12 January 1927 – 8 February 2019) was a French racing cyclist. He rode in the 1953 Tour de France.
