= François Chevalley =

Swiss cyclist

Personal information
- Born: 16 February 1924
- Died: 22 May 2011 (aged 87)

Cycling career
- Sport: Cycling
- Role: Rider

François Chevalley (16 February 1924 – 22 March 2011) was a Swiss racing cyclist. He rode in the 1953 Tour de France.
