= Hubert Bastianelli =

French cyclist (1929–1991)

Personal information
- Born: 14 June 1929
- Died: 4 April 1991 (aged 61)

Cycling career
- Sport: Cycling
- Role: Rider

Hubert Bastianelli (14 June 1929 – 4 April 1991) was a French racing cyclist. He rode in the 1953 Tour de France.
