= Jim Kirchen =

Luxembourgish cyclist

Personal information
- Born: 6 December 1932
- Died: 6 December 1997 (aged 65)

Cycling career
- Sport: Cycling
- Role: Rider

Jim Kirchen (6 December 1932 – 5 December 1997) was a Luxembourgish racing cyclist. He rode in the 1953 Tour de France.
