= Jos Suijkerbuijk =

Dutch cyclist

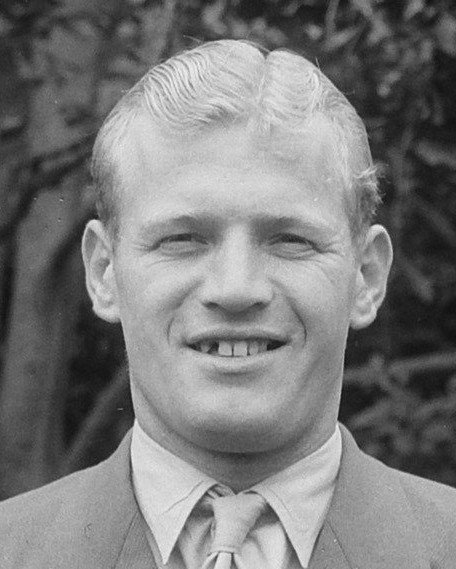
- Adri Suijkerbuijk (1954)

Personal information
- Born: 20 April 1929 Princenhage, Breda, Netherlands
- Died: 1 February 2015 (aged 85)

Cycling career
- Sport: Cycling
- Discipline: Road
- Role: Rider

Adri "Jos" Suijkerbuijk (20 April 1929 – 1 February 2015) was a Dutch professional road bicycle racer active in the 1950s. He competed in the 1953 and 1954 Tour de France races, he did however not finish in 1954 due to a fall in the second to last stage. His career ended in 1954.

Suijkerbuijk was born in Breda and died on 1 February 2015 in Made at the age of 85. In the week before his death his teammate Gerrit Voorting from the 1953 Tour died as well as teammate Henk Faanhof from the 1954 Tour.

== See also ==
- Gerrit Voorting
- Henk Faanhof
