= Roger Creton =

French cyclist (1926–2002)

Personal information
- Born: 24 May 1926
- Died: 2 July 2002 (aged 76)

Cycling career
- Sport: Cycling
- Role: Rider

Roger Creton (24 May 1926 – 2 July 2002) was a French racing cyclist. He rode in the 1950 Tour de France.
