= Henk Steevens =

Dutch cyclist (1931–2020)

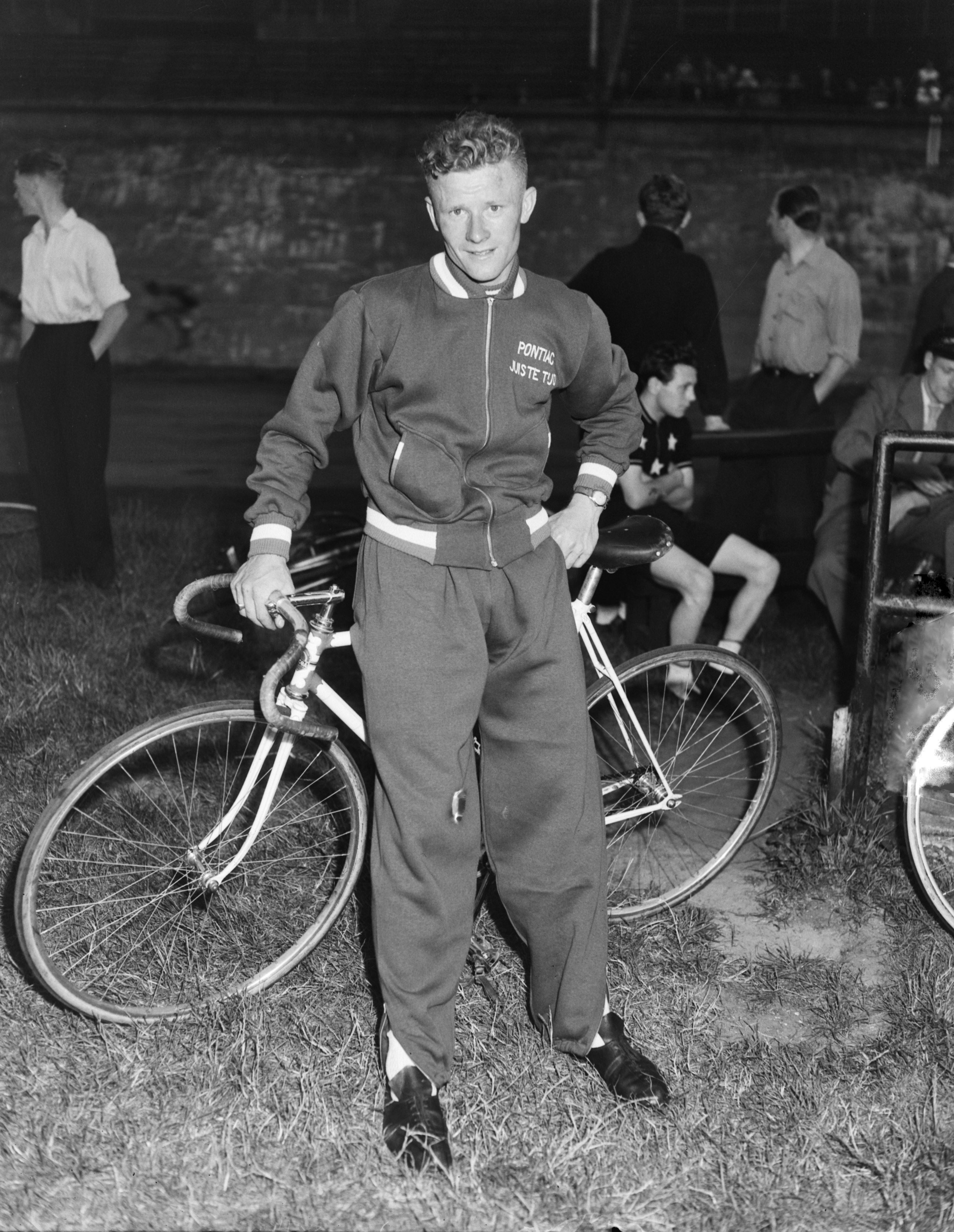
- Steevens (1953)

Personal information
- Born: 4 October 1931
- Died: 29 May 2020 (aged 88)

Cycling career
- Sport: Cycling

Professional teams
- 1953: Locomotief - Remington - Pontiac
- 1954: Maggi
- 1955: Nescafé

Managerial team
- Ovis en Driessen Stoffen

Major wins
- GP of Aken

Henk Steevens (4 October 1931 in Geleen – 29 May 2020) was a Dutch cyclist. He was professional from 1953 to 1955.

Steevens won the GP of Aken and the Grote Continental Prijs of Hannover. He was named together with Sjefke Janssen and Jan Nolten the “three of Elsloo” (in Dutch: Drie uit Elsloo), as they came all three from Eeslo. It was remarkable, three of the best Dutch cyclists of a city of only 4500 inhabitants at the time. They were all three part of the Dutch team at the 1953 Tour de France, aged 21. Initially Steevens didn’t want to start, but due to pressure from his team manager Kees Pellenaars he did start “to learn”. During the first stage he had a puncture and lost his watch. He fell in the fifth stage, but was able to finish. Steevens did not finish the complete Tour as he had to quit after six stages. He was part of the pre-selection for the 1954 Tour de France, but was not selected.

After his active career he became team manager of “Ovis” and “Driessen Stoffen”. He was also a staff member of the TVM cycling team.

His brother Harrie Steevens was also a cyclist.

Steevens died in May 2020 due to cancer, aged 88.

== Teams ==
1953 Locomotief - Remington - Pontiac (The Netherlands) until 02-07
1953 Locomotief - Remington - Pontiac (The Netherlands) from 27-07
1954 Individual
1954 Maggi (The Netherlands)
1955 Nescafé (The Netherlands)
