= Remo Sabattini =

Italian cyclist

Personal information
- Born: 10 June 1926
- Died: 28 October 2009 (aged 83)

Cycling career
- Sport: Cycling
- Role: Rider

Remo Sabattini (10 June 1926 – 28 October 2009) was an Italian racing cyclist. He rode in the 1950 Tour de France.
