= Galiano Pividori =

Italian cyclist

Personal information
- Born: 25 July 1914
- Died: 24 May 1988 (aged 73)

Cycling career
- Sport: Cycling
- Role: Rider

Galiano Pividori (25 July 1914 – 24 May 1988) was an Italian racing cyclist. He rode in the 1950 Tour de France. Italian by birth, he was naturalized French on 6 January 1965.
