= Noël Lajoie =

French cyclist

Personal information
- Born: 12 December 1927
- Died: 24 August 2014 (aged 86)

Cycling career
- Sport: Cycling
- Role: Rider

Noël Lajoie (12 December 1927 – 24 August 2014) was a French racing cyclist. He rode in the 1950 Tour de France.
