= Abdel-Kader Zaaf =

Algerian cyclist (1917–1986)

Personal information
- Full name: Abdel-Kader Zaaf
- Born: 27 January 1917 Blida, Algeria
- Died: 22 September 1986 (aged 69)

Cycling career
- Sport: Cycling
- Discipline: Road
- Role: Rider

Professional teams
- 1948: Volta
- 1949: Duralca
- 1950–1955: Terrot–Wolber

Abdel-Kader Zaaf (27 January 1917 – 22 September 1986) was an Algerian cyclist. He participated four times in the Tour de France, in 1948, 1950, 1951 and 1952. He finished in last place in the 1951 Tour de France.

== 1950 Tour de France ==
As a professional rider, Zaaf was best known for stage 13 of the 1950 Tour de France. The stage, from Perpignan to Nîmes, reached temperatures of 40 °C. With about 200 km to go in the stage, Abdel-Kader Zaaf attacked with compatriot Marcel Molinès.

They built up an impressive lead nearing 30 minutes. Abdel-Kader accepted a bottle from a supporter alongside the road (some sources say a second bottle was also accepted) which allegedly contained wine or some other form of alcohol.

The alcohol combined with the heat had an immediate effect on Abdel-Kader, who started zigzagging and had to interrupt the stage. He rested under a tree, where he fell asleep. He was awakened a short while later by supporters claiming the peloton was fast approaching.

Abdel-Kader jumped on his bicycle and accelerated away, but in the wrong direction.

He was taken to hospital, while Molinès won the stage.

== Major results ==
1948
1st Stage 2 Circuit des six provinces
1949
1st Stage 13 Tour d'Algérie
1950
1st Stages 8 & 16 Tour d'Algérie
1st Stage 4, 7, 9, 11 & 14 Tour du Maroc
1951
10th Elfstedenronde
1952
1st Stage 11 Tour du Maroc
1953
1st Stage 9 Tour d'Algérie
1st Stage 8 Tour du Maroc
1955
1st Stage 10b Tour du Maroc
3rd Manche-Océan
10th Grand Prix des Nations
