= Marcel Verschueren =

Belgian cyclist

Personal information
- Born: 8 February 1928
- Died: 2 December 2008 (aged 80)

Cycling career
- Sport: Cycling
- Role: Rider

Marcel Verschueren (8 February 1928 – 2 December 2008) was a Belgian racing cyclist. He rode in the 1950 Tour de France.
