= Maurice Kallert =

French cyclist

Personal information
- Born: 18 June 1920
- Died: 30 May 2000 (aged 79)

Cycling career
- Sport: Cycling
- Role: Rider

Maurice Kallert (18 June 1920 – 30 May 2000) was a French racing cyclist. He rode in the 1950 Tour de France.
