= Custodio Dos Reis =

French cyclist

Personal information
- Born: November 30, 1922 Rabat, Morocco
- Died: November 26, 1959 (aged 36)

Cycling career
- Sport: Cycling
- Discipline: Road
- Role: Rider

Custodio Dos Reis (30 November 1922 – 26 November 1959) was a French professional road bicycle racer. Born in Rabat with Portuguese nationality to parents from Algarve, Dos Reis became French citizen in 1931. Dos Reis won four stages of the 1946 Volta a Portugal, and two stages at the 1947 event. In 1950, he won the 14th stage of the 1950 Tour de France.

== Major results ==
1950
Tour de France:

Winner stage 14
