= Marcel Molinès =

Personal information
- Full name: Marcel Molinès
- Born: 22 December 1928 Chibli, Algeria
- Died: 1 July 2011 (aged 82) Marseille, France

Cycling career
- Sport: Cycling
- Discipline: Road
- Role: Rider

Major wins
- Grand Tours Tour de France 1 individual stage (1950)

Marcel Molinès (22 December 1928 - 1 July 2011) was a professional road racing cyclist. Molinès is the first cyclist born in Africa to win a stage of the Tour de France.

Molinès, born in Algeria (at that time part of France), competed in the 1950 Tour de France in a team representing French North Africa. His background meant neither he nor his teammate, Abdel-Kader Zaaf, suffered in that summer's heat wave. The temperature was so high on the stage from Perpignan to Nîmes that the race stopped at St-Maxime on the Mediterranean coast and many riders ran or even cycled into the sea.

Two exceptions were Molinès and Zaaf, who profited from their lowly status and from a widespread disinclination to ride fast by riding 200 km by themselves and sometimes getting up to 20 minutes' lead. Their advantage was enough to make Zaaf the de facto leader of the race and he would have taken the yellow jersey of best rider had he not began to zigzag 15 km (8m) before the end. An official, or perhaps a spectator, pulled him off his bike and let him sleep under a tree. Molinès went on to win by five minutes and became the first cyclist born in Africa to win a stage.

His career included riding for big teams such as Peugeot and Dilecta. He has subsequently vanished and nothing is known of his whereabouts or if, like Zaaf, he has died.

== Major results ==
1950
1st Stage 13 Tour de France
