= Jean Baldassari =

French cyclist (1925–2018)

Personal information
- Born: 18 December 1925
- Died: 10 December 2018 (aged 92)

Cycling career
- Sport: Cycling
- Role: Rider

Jean Baldassari (18 December 1925 – 10 December 2018) was a French racing cyclist. He rode in the 1950 Tour de France.
