= Hervé Prouzet =

French cyclist

Personal information
- Born: 20 June 1920
- Died: 6 January 2010 (aged 89)

Cycling career
- Sport: Cycling
- Role: Rider

Hervé Prouzet (20 June 1920 – 6 January 2010) was a French racing cyclist. He rode in the 1950 Tour de France.
