= Jeng Kirchen =

Luxembourgish cyclist

Personal information
- Full name: Jeng Kirchen
- Born: December 13, 1919 Hostert, Luxembourg
- Died: November 30, 2010 (aged 90) Luxembourg City, Luxembourg

Cycling career
- Sport: Cycling
- Current team: Retired
- Disciplines: Road; Cyclo-cross
- Role: Rider

Professional teams
- 1943: Victoria
- 1945–1947: Rochet
- 1948–1953: Garin

Jeng Kirchen (December 13, 1919 in Hostert – November 30, 2010) was a Luxembourgish road racing cyclist who twice finished 5th in the Tour de France. Kirchen won his native race, the Tour de Luxembourg, in 1952, and took a total of 16 professional wins. He was the uncle and great-uncle of fellow cyclists Erny Kirchen and Kim Kirchen.

== Major results ==
1943
4th, Overall, Tour de Luxembourg
1945
1st, Metz - Luxembourg
11th, Grand Prix des Nations
1946

Luxembourg National Road Race Champion

1st, Stage 4, Tour de Luxembourg
7th, Overall, Tour de Luxembourg
1947
3rd, Overall, Tour de Luxembourg
18th, Overall, Tour de France
1948

Luxembourg National Cyclo-cross Championships

5th, Overall, Tour de Suisse
5th, Overall, Tour de France
1949
13th, Overall, Tour de France
1950
3rd, Overall, Tour de Luxembourg
4th, Overall, Tour de Suisse
5th, Overall, Tour de France
1951

Luxembourg National Road Race Champion

4th, Overall, Deutschland Tour
7th, Overall, Tour de Luxembourg
7th, Overall, Tour de Suisse
1952

Luxembourg National Cyclo-cross Championships

1st Overall Tour de Luxembourg
6th, Overall, Deutschland Tour
1953
10th, Overall, Tour de Luxembourg
