= Robert Castelin =

French cyclist

Personal information
- Born: 23 May 1920
- Died: 11 July 2009 (aged 89)

Cycling career
- Sport: Cycling
- Role: Rider

Robert Castelin (23 May 1920 – 11 July 2009) was a French racing cyclist. He rode in the 1950 Tour de France.
