= Kléber Piot =

French cyclist

Personal information
- Born: 20 October 1920 Saint-Denis, France
- Died: 5 January 1990 (aged 69) Enghien-les-Bains, France

Cycling career
- Sport: Cycling
- Role: Rider

Kléber Piot (20 October 1920 – 5 January 1990) was a French cyclist. He rode in the 1947 and 1948 Tour de France. He finished in third place in the 1945 Paris–Roubaix.
