= Bim Diederich =

Luxembourgish cyclist

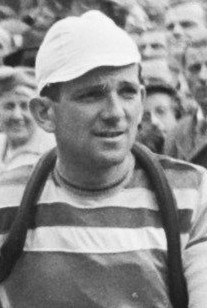

Personal information
- Full name: Jean Diederich
- Nicknames: Bim, Le Duc de Grammont (The Duke of Geraardsbergen)
- Born: 20 February 1922 Esch-sur-Alzette, Luxembourg
- Died: 6 December 2012 (aged 90) Pétange, Luxembourg

Cycling career
- Sport: Cycling
- Current team: Retired
- Discipline: Road
- Role: Rider

Major wins
- 3 stages Tour de France

Jean "Bim" Diederich (20 February 1922 – 6 December 2012) was a professional Luxembourgish road bicycle racer, with an impressive record in the Tour de France.

Diederich was born in Esch-sur-Alzette, Luxembourg, and was active in competition from 1946 to 1954. He finished sixth in the road race at the 1947 Road World Championships. He had fourteen wins, including stage wins in the 1950 Tour de France (finishing in Menton), the 1951 Tour de France (from Reims to Ghent, leading the race solo over the Muur van Geraardsbergen before crossing the finish line, earning the nickname "Le Duc de Grammont" or "the Duke of Geraardsbergen"), and the 1952 Tour de France (into Namur). He wore the yellow jersey as leader of the general classification for three days during the 1951 Tour.

He was the father-in-law of cyclist Lucien Didier, and the grandfather of cyclist Laurent Didier.

== Major results ==
1947
2nd Overall Tour de Luxembourg
6th Road race, UCI Road World Championships
1949
1st Overall Tour de Luxembourg
Athus
1950
Tour de France

Winner stage 15

2nd Overall Tour de Luxembourg
1951
Tour de France

Winner stage 2
Wearing yellow jersey for three days

2nd Overall Tour de Luxembourg
1952
Tour de France

Winner stage 5

1st Tour de Lorraine
