= Georges Meunier =

French cyclist

Personal information
- Full name: Georges Meunier
- Born: 9 May 1925 Vierzon, France
- Died: 13 December 2015 (aged 90)

Cycling career
- Sport: Cycling
- Discipline: Road
- Role: Rider

Major wins
- 2 stages Tour de France
Medal record
Men's cyclo-cross
Representing France
World Championships
Bronze medal – third place	1957 Edelare	Elite Men's Race

Georges Meunier (Vierzon, 9 May 1925 – 13 December 2015) was a French professional road bicycle racer. He won two stages in the Tour de France. In 1960, he became French national cyclo-cross champion.

== Major results ==
1950
Tour de France:

9th place overall classification

1951
Tour de France:

Winner stage 3

1953
Tour de France:

Winner stage 19

1955
Grand-Bourg
Saint-Amand
1956
GP de la Trinité
1957
Brive
1960
France national cyclo-cross championships
