= Jean Goldschmit =

Luxembourgish cyclist

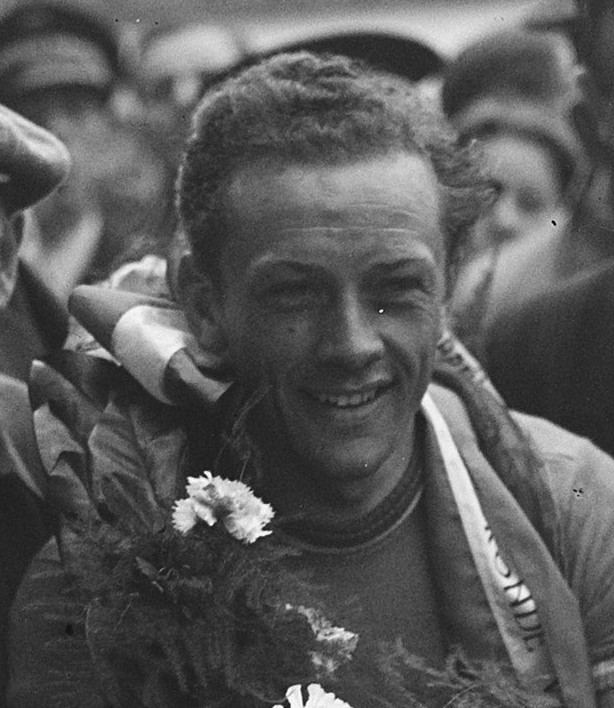

Personal information
- Full name: Jean Goldschmit
- Born: 20 February 1924 Weimerskirch, Luxembourg
- Died: 14 February 1994 (aged 69)

Cycling career
- Sport: Cycling
- Discipline: Road
- Role: Rider

Major wins
- 2 stages Tour de France

Jean Goldschmit (20 February 1924 – 14 February 1994) was a professional Luxembourgish road bicycle racer. He was professional from 1946 to 1953 and had 14 victories which included two stage wins and wearing the yellow jersey as leader of the general classification in the Tour de France for three stages. Other wins included cyclo-cross champion of Luxembourg in 1946 and 1947 and road race champion of Luxembourg in 1947 and 1950.

== Major results ==
1945
1st Tour de Luxembourg
1946
Luxembourg national cyclo-cross championship
1947
Luxembourg national cyclo-cross championship
Luxembourg national road race championship
1948
1st Tour de Luxembourg
2nd Tour de Romandie
1949
Tour de France:

8th place overall classification
Winner stage 14

1950
Luxembourg national road race championship
Tour de France:

10th place overall classification
Winner stage 1
Wearing yellow jersey for three days

Paris-Metz
