= Marcel Hendrickx (cyclist) =

Belgian cyclist

Personal information
- Born: 21 April 1925 Houthalen, Belgium
- Died: 15 February 2008 (aged 82) Bilzen, Belgium

Cycling career
- Sport: Cycling
- Role: Rider

Marcel Hendrickx (21 April 1925 – 15 February 2008) was a Belgian racing cyclist. He rode in the 1949 Tour de France.
