= Robert Desbats =

French cyclist

Personal information
- Born: 9 February 1922 Issac, France
- Died: 16 April 2007 (aged 85) Saint-Aubin-de-Médoc, France

Cycling career
- Sport: Cycling
- Role: Rider

Robert Desbats (9 February 1922 – 16 April 2007) was a French racing cyclist. He rode in the 1948 and 1949 Tour de France.
