= Attilio Redolfi =

Italian-French cyclist

Personal information
- Born: 8 September 1923 Aviano, Italy
- Died: 15 June 1997 (aged 73) Draguignan, France

Cycling career
- Sport: Cycling
- Role: Rider

Attilio Redolfi (8 September 1923 – 15 June 1997) was an Italian-French racing cyclist. He rode in the 1949 Tour de France. Italian by birth, he was naturalized French on 14 January 1949.
