= Émile Baffert =

French cyclist

Personal information
- Full name: Émile Baffert
- Born: 26 August 1924 Grenoble, France
- Died: 25 July 2017 (age 92)

Cycling career
- Sport: Cycling
- Discipline: Road
- Role: Rider

Major wins
- 1 stage 1950 Tour de France

Émile Baffert (26 August 1924 – 25 July 2017) was a French professional road bicycle racer. In 1950, he was the winner of the last stage of the 1950 Tour de France. He was born in Grenoble.

== Major results ==
1946
Circuit des Bords de l'Ain
1947
Nantua
1949
Commentry
Charlieu
1950
Gap
Tour de France:

Winner stage 22

Tour de Haute-Savoie
1952
Aubusson
Circuit du Mont Blanc
Firminy
Grand-Bourg
Grenoble
Nantua
Romans
1953
Aubenas
1955
GP Kanton Geneva
Riom
Circuit de Drome - Ardèche
