= 1950 Tour de France =

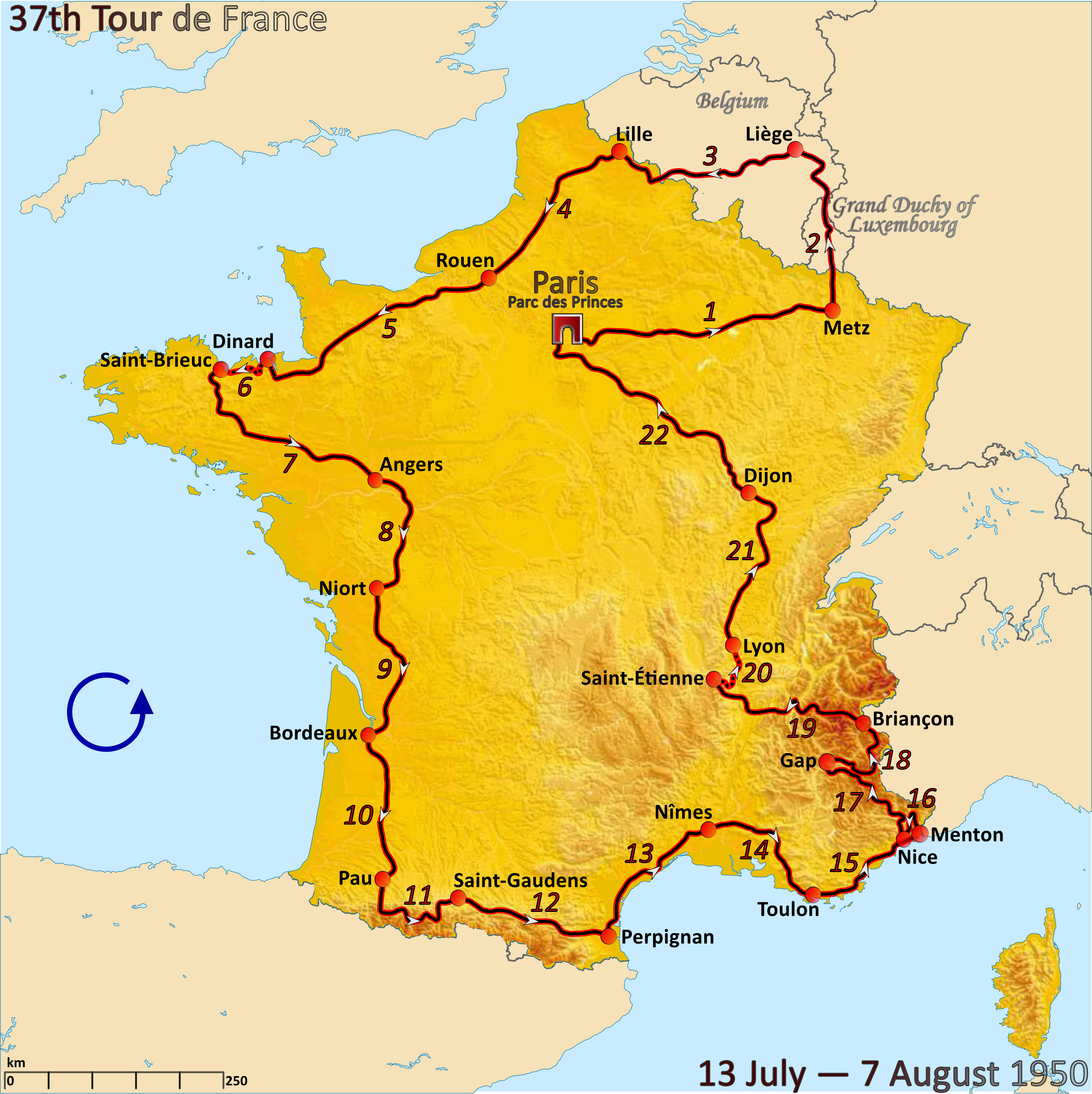
- Route of the 1950 Tour de France followed counterclockwise, starting and finishing in Paris

Race details
- Dates: 13 July – 7 August 1950
- Stages: 22
- Distance: 4,773 km (2,966 mi)
- Winning time: 145h 36' 56"

Results
Jersey awarded to the overall winner	Winner	Ferdinand Kübler (SUI)	(Switzerland)
	Second	Stan Ockers (BEL)	(Belgium)
	Third	Louison Bobet (FRA)	(France)
	Mountains	Louison Bobet (FRA)	(France)
	Team	Belgium	

The 1950 Tour de France was the 37th edition of the Tour de France, taking place from 13 July to 7 August. It consisted of 22 stages over 4,773 km (2,966 mi).

Gino Bartali, captain of the Italian team, threatened and assaulted on the Col d'Aspin by some French supporters accusing him to have caused Jean Robic's fall, retired after winning the 12th stage from Pau to Saint-Gaudens and left the race together with all the other Italian riders (including Fiorenzo Magni, who was wearing the yellow jersey). The lead transferred to Swiss cyclist Ferdinand Kübler, who was able to keep the lead until the end of the race. Kübler became the first Swiss winner of the Tour de France.

The mountains classification was won by Louison Bobet, while the Belgian team won the team classification.

Algerian-French cyclist Abdel-Kader Zaaf became famous in this Tour de France by being so disoriented that he rode in the wrong direction.

== Innovations and changes ==
The "interest" for the yellow jersey (the prize money for the leader of the general classification after each stage) was increased to 100.000 French Francs. In 1949, the French TV had reported every evening about the Tour de France, and in 1950, live coverage of every stage was given. The time cut-offs, the maximum time a cyclist was allowed to finish a stage, was reduced.

In the previous years, the Tour de France had been decided in the mountains. The organisation wanted the other aspects of the race to be more important, so some mountains were not visited in 1950, and the time bonification for cyclists that reached mountain tops first was reduced. from 1 minute in 1949 to 40 seconds in 1950.

The riders had sometimes been helped by team assistants who directly assisted the riders by pushing them from within the team cars, under the pretence of supplying them with a drink. In 1950, the Tour organisation paid extra care for this, and penalised the cyclists if it happened.

The prize for winning a stage was increased from 30.000 French Francs to 50.000 French Francs.

== Teams ==
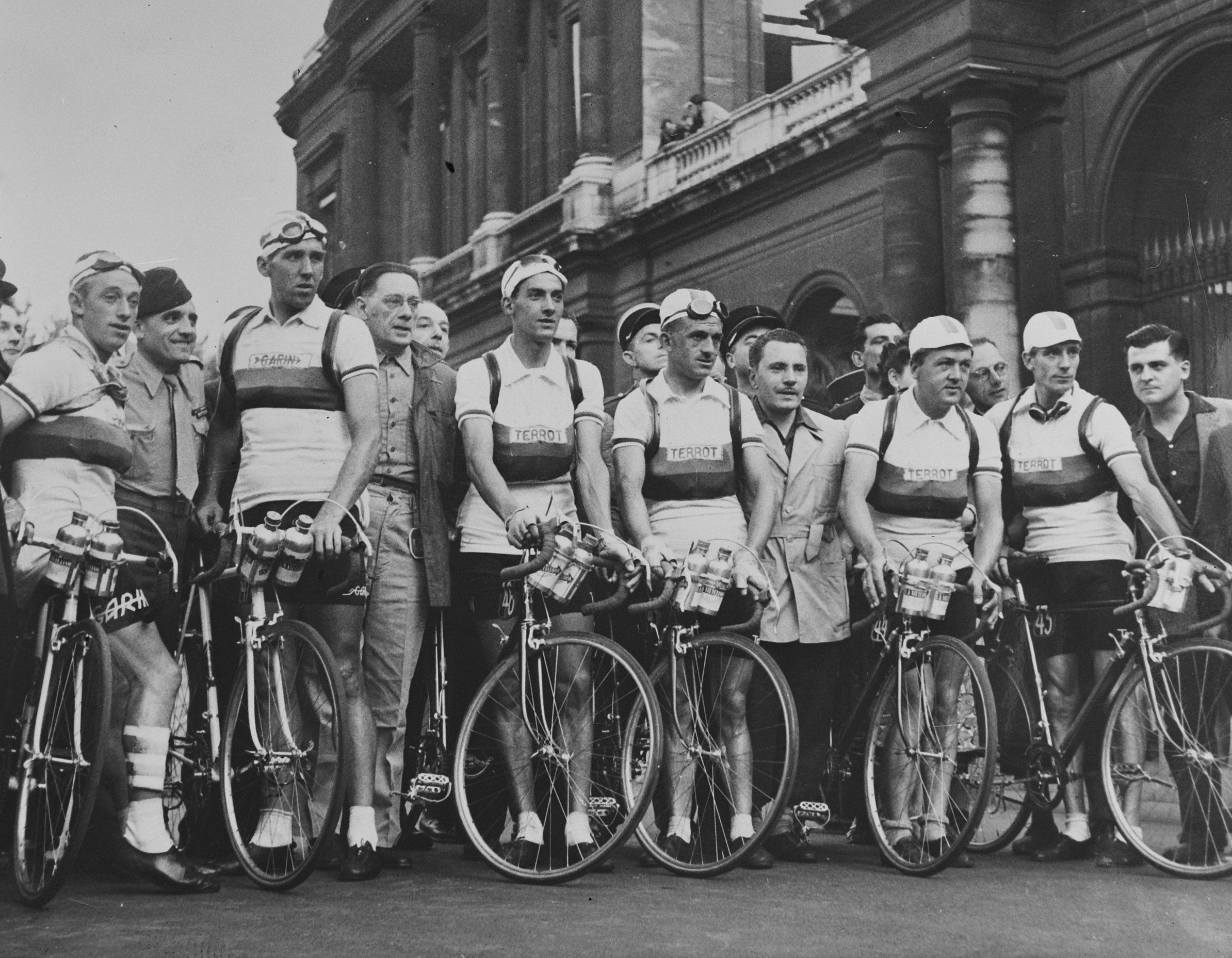
The Dutch team at the start of the race in Paris

As was the custom since the 1930 Tour de France, the 1950 Tour de France was contested by national and regional teams. The three major cycling countries in 1950, Italy, Belgium and France, each sent a team of 10 cyclists. Other countries sent teams of 6 cyclists: Switzerland, Luxembourg and the Netherlands. Italy and Belgium also sent two extra teams of young riders of 6 cyclists each. The French regional cyclists were divided into five teams of 10 cyclists: Paris, Île-de-France/North-East, West, Centre/South-West and South-East. Originally, the plan was to have one extra international team of six cyclists with Spanish cyclists, but this extra team became a North African team, with Moroccan and Algerian cyclists; at the time, portions of Morocco were a French protectorate, and Algeria was an integral part of France. This was the first African team to compete in the Tour de France. Altogether this made 116 cyclists. No Spanish team was invited, because the Tour organisation were displeased with the Spanish team leaving the race early in the 1949 Tour de France.

There were 60 French cyclists (of which 2 French-Moroccan and 4 French-Algerian), 22 Italian, 16 Belgian, 6 Dutch, 6 Luxembourg and 6 Swiss cyclists. On the first day of the race, before the Tour had started, French cyclist Charles Coste was replaced by Paul Giguet.

The teams entering the race were:

- Italy
- Belgium
- France
- Switzerland
- Luxembourg
- Netherlands
- Italy Cadets
- Belgium Aiglons
- Paris
- Île-de-France/North-East
- West
- Centre/South-West
- South-East
- North Africa

== Pre-race favourites ==
The winner of the previous Tour de France, Fausto Coppi, was injured during the 1950 Giro d'Italia, so he could not defend his title. Still the Italians were favourites, especially Gino Bartali, who had come second in the 1950 Giro d'Italia behind Hugo Koblet, who did not enter the 1950 Tour de France. Other candidates for the victory were Bobet, Kübler, Ockers and Geminiani. Two days before the Tour started, the organisation held a poll amongst 25 journalists, who each gave their eight favourites for the victory. Bartali was on the most lists, 23. Robic was written on 20 lists, Lauredi on 19, Bobet and Goldschmidt on 17.

== Route and stages ==
The 1950 Tour de France started on 13 July, and had four rest days, in Dinard, Pau, Nice and Saint-Étienne. The route had been revealed in January 1950. The highest point of elevation in the race was 2,360 m (7,740 ft) at the summit of the Col d'Izoard mountain pass on stage 18.

Stage characteristics and winners
Stage	Date	Course	Distance	Type	Winner
1	13 July	Paris to Metz	307 km (191 mi)	Plain stage	Jean Goldschmit (LUX)
2	14 July	Metz to Liège (Belgium)	241 km (150 mi)	Plain stage	Adolfo Leoni (ITA)
3	15 July	Liège (Belgium) to Lille	232.5 km (144 mi)	Plain stage	Alfredo Pasotti (ITA)
4	16 July	Lille to Rouen	231 km (144 mi)	Plain stage	Stan Ockers (BEL)
5	17 July	Rouen to Dinard	316 km (196 mi)	Plain stage	Giovanni Corrieri (ITA)
	18 July	Dinard		Rest day	
6	19 July	Dinard to Saint-Brieuc	78 km (48 mi)	Individual time trial	Ferdinand Kübler (SUI)
7	20 July	Saint-Brieuc to Angers	248 km (154 mi)	Plain stage	Nello Lauredi (FRA)
8	21 July	Angers to Niort	181 km (112 mi)	Plain stage	Fiorenzo Magni (ITA)
9	22 July	Niort to Bordeaux	206 km (128 mi)	Plain stage	Alfredo Pasotti (ITA)
10	23 July	Bordeaux to Pau	202 km (126 mi)	Plain stage	Marcel Dussault (FRA)
	22 July	Pau		Rest day	
11	25 July	Pau to St. Gaudens	230 km (143 mi)	Stage with mountain(s)	Gino Bartali (ITA)
12	26 July	Saint-Gaudens to Perpignan	233 km (145 mi)	Plain stage	Maurice Blomme (BEL)
13	27 July	Perpignan to Nîmes	215 km (134 mi)	Plain stage	Marcel Molinès (FRA)
14	28 July	Nîmes to Toulon	222 km (138 mi)	Plain stage	Custodio Dos Reis (FRA)
15	29 July	Toulon to Menton (Note: The 15th stage was originally scheduled to end in Sanremo, but after the Italian teams left the race, the route was changed to avoid entering Italy.)	205.5 km (128 mi)	Stage with mountain(s)	Jean Diederich (LUX)
16	30 July	Menton to Nice	96 km (60 mi)	Stage with mountain(s)	Ferdinand Kübler (SUI)
	31 July	Nice		Rest day	
17	1 August	Nice to Gap	229 km (142 mi)	Stage with mountain(s)	Raphaël Géminiani (FRA)
18	2 August	Gap to Briançon	165 km (103 mi)	Stage with mountain(s)	Louison Bobet (FRA)
19	3 August	Briançon to Saint-Étienne	291 km (181 mi)	Stage with mountain(s)	Raphaël Géminiani (FRA)
	4 August	Saint-Étienne		Rest day	
20	5 August	Saint-Étienne to Lyon	98 km (61 mi)	Mountain time trial	Ferdinand Kübler (SUI)
21	6 August	Lyon to Dijon	233 km (145 mi)	Plain stage	Gino Sciardis (FRA)
22	7 August	Dijon to Paris	314 km (195 mi)	Plain stage	Émile Baffert (FRA)
	Total		4,773 km (2,966 mi)		

== Race overview ==
The start of the 1950 Tour de France was given on 13 July by Orson Welles. Things started well for the Italian team, as they won five of the first ten stages, although the yellow jersey for the leader of the general classification was exchanged between Luxembourgian Jean Goldschmit and French Bernard Gauthier.

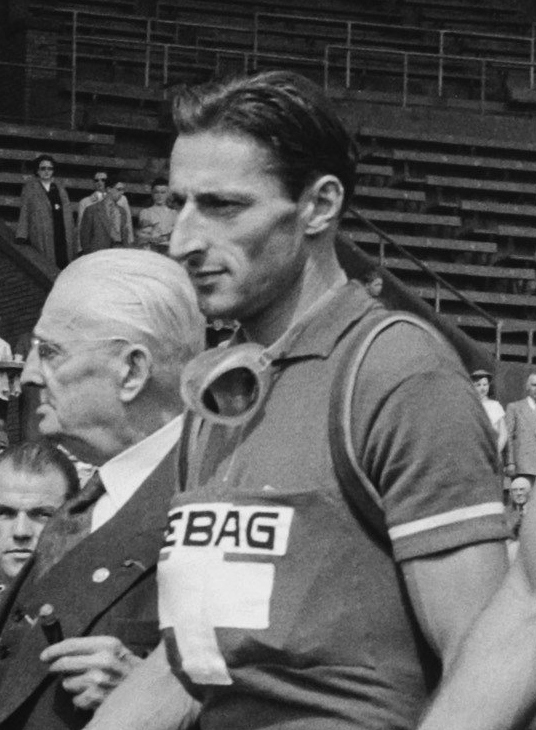
Ferdinand Kübler (pictured in 1954) won three stages on his way to winning the general classification

The sixth stage was won by Swiss cyclist Ferdinand Kübler. During the race, Kübler had changed jerseys, which gave him 25 seconds penalty time.

In the eleventh stage, the first mountain stage of the race, Gino Bartali was away together with French Jean Robic. There was a lot of crowd, and they pressed forward to see the cyclist coming. This caused Bartali to fall down during the descent of the Col d'Aspin, and this caused Robic to also fall down. Bartali got up and won the stage, but felt threatened by spectators, who punched and kicked him. One spectator had threatened Bartali with a knife. Bartali told his team manager Alfredo Binda that he was leaving the Tour de France, and that all Italian cyclists should abandon the race. Not all Italian cyclists wanted to leave: the members from the second Italian team (the Italian Cadets) and Adolfo Leoni wanted to stay. Some Italian cyclists said they wanted to stay in the race to help Magni defend the leading position. Magni felt bad about giving up the chance to win the Tour de France, but accepted the decision. The Tour organisation wanted to keep the Italian cyclists in the race, and among other compromises offered to give them neutral gray jerseys, so the spectators would not recognize them. None of this helped, and both Italian teams left the race. As a consequence, the fifteenth stage, that was originally scheduled to end in Italy (Sanremo), was rescheduled to end in Menton.

General classification after stage 11 (1–6)
Rank	Rider	Team	Time
1	Fiorenzo Magni (ITA)	Italy	73h 23' 11"
2	Ferdinand Kübler (SUI)	Switzerland	+ 2' 31"
3	Louison Bobet (FRA)	France	+ 3' 20"
4	Raphaël Géminiani (FRA)	France	+ 3' 25"
5	Stan Ockers (BEL)	Belgium	+ 3' 37"
6	Gino Bartali (ITA)	Italy	+ 4' 17"

With Magni out of the race, Swiss Ferdinand Kübler became the new leader of the general classification, closely followed by Bobet and Geminiani. Out of respect for Magni, Kübler did not wear the yellow jersey (indicating the leader in the general classification) in the 12th stage. In the twelfth stage, all the favourites finished together. That stage was won by Belgian Maurice Blomme, but not without difficulties: he was so exhausted that he mistook a dark shadow for the finish line, and stopped racing. The secretary of the Tour de France, Jean Garnault, had to put him back on his bicycle so he would ride the last meters of the stage.

In that stage thirteen, the temperature was extremely high. Two riders from the North African team, Marcel Molinès and Abdel-Kader Zaaf, broke away after 15 kilometers, and created a large gap, also because the other cyclists were more occupied with getting drinks. Some 20 kilometers from the finish, Zaaf started to zigzag across the road. A safety official pulled him from the race, afraid for his safety, and Molinès rode through alone. Zaaf did not agree with the safety official, and mounted his bicycle again. He quickly fell off his bicycle and fell asleep, and spectators moved him into the shade of a tree. When he woke up, he realised that he was in a race, got on his bicycle again and rode away, but going into the wrong direction. An ambulance was called, and Zaaf was taken away. Zaaf claimed that he had received wine from a spectator, and as a Muslim he was not used to the alcohol. Behind the two North-African cyclists, Kübler had attacked, and left his rivals Raphaël Géminiani and Louison Bobet minutes behind. Of the favourites, only Ockers managed to stay with Kübler.

In stage fifteen, it was still hot, and the riders were not motivated to race. They stopped during the race to cool down in the Mediterranean Sea, but were quickly ordered by Jacques Goddet to continue the race. The journalists that followed the race reported on this in a humorous way, and the organisation therefore fined them.

In the sixteenth stage, Ockers and Bobet finished shortly after Kübler. The Tour de France jury said Bobet came in second, and gave him the 30 seconds bonification time, but the Belgian team manager Sylvère Maes protested against this decision, because he argued that Ockers came in second. Maes threatened to take the Belgian team out of the race, but the Tour direction did not change their decision. In the end, the Belgian team stayed in the race.

Second placed rider in the general classification, Ockers was unable to win back time in later stages, so Kübler stayed in the lead for the rest of the race, and became the first Swiss winner of the Tour de France.

Kübler's victory is seen as partially his own accomplishment, but also partially due to the absence of Fausto Coppi and the withdrawal of the Italian teams. According to Kübler, it became more difficult to win the race after the Italians had left the race, because the attention was no longer focussed on the Italians, but on Kübler. Kübler felt that he would have been able to win the 1950 Tour de France if the Italians would have not abandoned, because he was the best in the time trials.

== Classification leadership and minor prizes ==
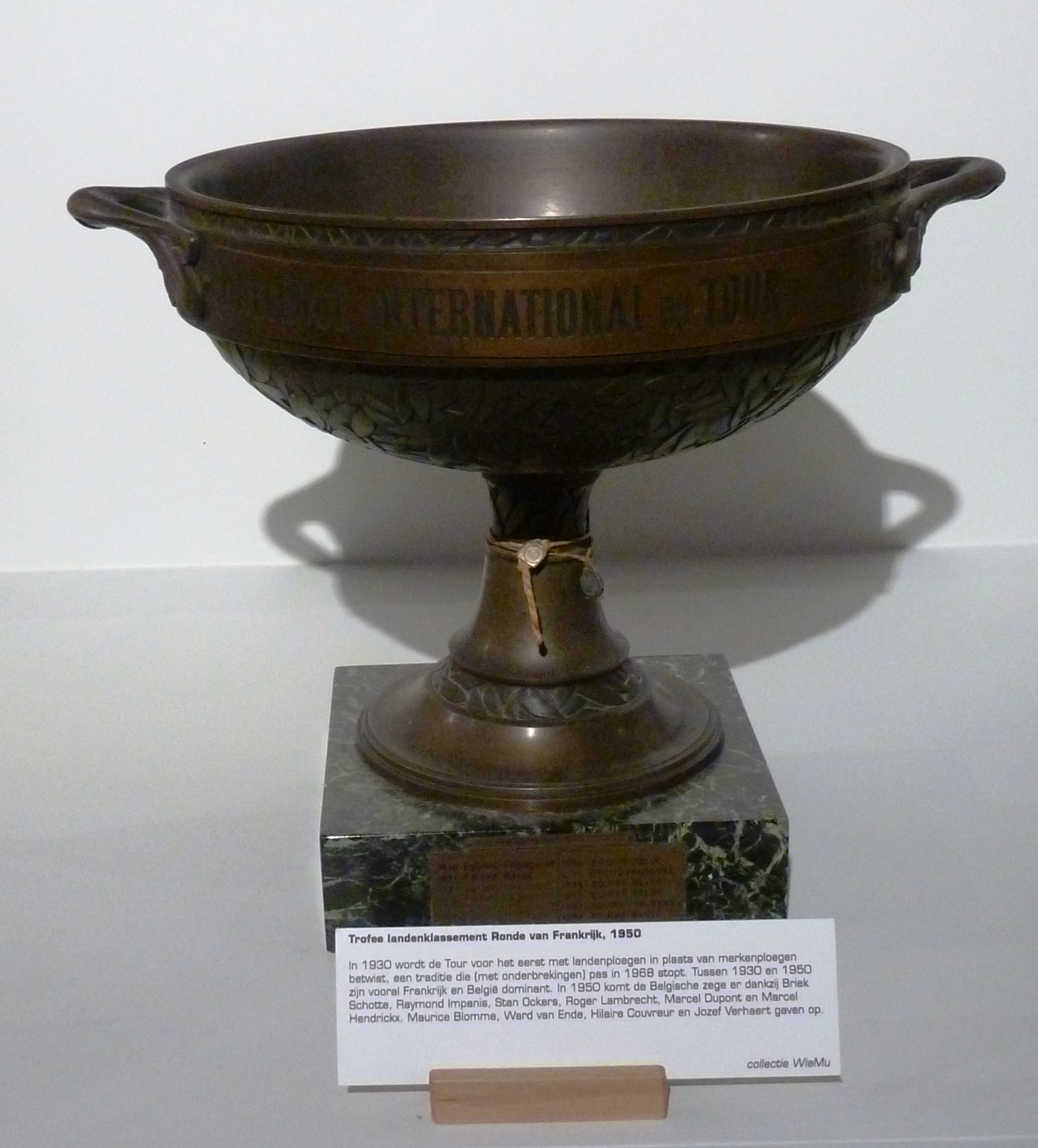
The team classification trophy for 1950, won by the Belgium team

The time that each cyclist required to finish each stage was recorded, and these times were added together for the general classification. If a cyclist had received a time bonus, it was subtracted from this total; all time penalties were added to this total. The cyclist with the least accumulated time was the race leader, identified by the yellow jersey. The total prize money in the 1950 Tour de France was 14 million French Francs; 1 million French Francs were for the winner of the general classification. Of the 116 cyclists that started the 1950 Tour de France, 51 finished the race.

Points for the mountains classification were earned by reaching the mountain tops first. The system was the same as in 1949: there were two types of mountain tops: the hardest ones, in category 1, gave 10 points to the first cyclist, the easier ones, in category 2, gave 5 points to the first cyclist, and the easiest ones, in category 3, gave 3 points. Louison Bobet won this classification after having led the classification almost the entire race, although he only reached 2 of the 14 mountain tops first.

The team classification was calculated by adding the times in the general classification of the best three cyclists per team. It was won by the Belgian team, with a large margin over the French team. Of the other four teams that started, the two Italian teams had abandoned the race, and the North African team finished with only two riders and the Dutch team with only one rider, therefore they were ineligible for the team classification. The Souvenir Henri Desgrange was given in honour of Tour founder Henri Desgrange to the first rider to pass the summit of the Col du Lautaret on stage 19. This prize was won by Apo Lazaridès. The special award for the best regional rider was won by sixth-placed Kléber Piot.

Classification leadership by stage
Stage	Winner	General classification	Mountains classification (Note: No jersey was awarded to the leader of the mountains classification until a white jersey with red polka dots was introduced in 1975.)	Team classification
1	Jean Goldschmit	Jean Goldschmit	no award	Luxembourg
2	Adolfo Leoni	Jean Goldschmit	no award	Luxembourg
3	Alfredo Pasotti	Bernard Gauthier	no award	South-East
4	Stan Ockers	Bernard Gauthier	no award	South-East
5	Giovanni Corrieri	Bernard Gauthier	no award	South-East
6	Ferdinand Kübler	Jean Goldschmit	no award	Belgium
7	Nello Lauredi	Bernard Gauthier	no award	South-East
8	Fiorenzo Magni	Bernard Gauthier	no award	South-East
9	Alfredo Pasotti	Bernard Gauthier	no award	South-East
10	Marcel Dussault	Bernard Gauthier	no award	South-East
11	Gino Bartali	Fiorenzo Magni	Louison Bobet	Italy
12	Maurice Blomme	Ferdinand Kübler	Louison Bobet	France
13	Marcel Molinès	Ferdinand Kübler	Louison Bobet	Belgium
14	Custodio Dos Reis	Ferdinand Kübler	Louison Bobet	Belgium
15	Jean Diederich	Ferdinand Kübler	Louison Bobet	Belgium
16	Ferdinand Kübler	Ferdinand Kübler	Louison Bobet	Belgium
17	Raphaël Géminiani	Ferdinand Kübler	Jean Robic	Belgium
18	Louison Bobet	Ferdinand Kübler	Louison Bobet	Belgium
19	Raphaël Géminiani	Ferdinand Kübler	Louison Bobet	Belgium
20	Ferdinand Kübler	Ferdinand Kübler	Louison Bobet	Belgium
21	Gino Sciardis	Ferdinand Kübler	Louison Bobet	Belgium
22	Émile Baffert	Ferdinand Kübler	Louison Bobet	Belgium
Final		Ferdinand Kübler	Louison Bobet	Belgium

== Final standings ==
=== General classification ===
Final general classification (1–10)
Rank	Rider	Team	Time
1	Ferdinand Kübler (SUI)	Switzerland	145h 36' 56"
2	Stan Ockers (BEL)	Belgium	+ 9' 30"
3	Louison Bobet (FRA)	France	+ 22' 19"
4	Raphaël Géminiani (FRA)	France	+ 31' 14"
5	Jean Kirchen (LUX)	Luxembourg	+ 34' 21"
6	Kléber Piot (FRA)	Île-de-France/North-East	+ 41' 35"
7	Pierre Cogan (FRA)	Centre/South-West	+ 52' 22"
8	Raymond Impanis (BEL)	Belgium	+ 53' 34"
9	Georges Meunier (FRA)	Centre/South-West	+ 54' 29"
10	Jean Goldschmit (LUX)	Luxembourg	+ 55' 21"

Final general classification (11–51)
Rank	Rider	Team	Time
11	Pierre Brambilla (FRA)	South-East	+ 57' 14"
12	Jean Robic (FRA)	West	+ 59' 45"
13	Roger Lambrecht (BEL)	Belgium	+ 1h 00' 29"
14	André Brulé (FRA)	Île-de-France/North-East	+ 1h 05' 29"
15	Marcel Verschueren (BEL)	Belgium Aiglons	+ 1h 05' 50"
16	Marcel De Mulder (BEL)	Belgium Aiglons	+ 1h 11' 38"
17	Bernard Gauthier (FRA)	South-East	+ 1h 13' 29"
18	Jean Diederich (LUX)	Luxembourg	+ 1h 14' 56"
19	Robert Castelin (FRA)	South-East	+ 1h 25' 12"
20	Attilio Redolfi (FRA)	Île-de-France/North-East	+ 1h 28' 57"
21	Willy Kemp (LUX)	Luxembourg	+ 1h 37' 53"
22	Brik Schotte (BEL)	Belgium	+ 1h 46' 51"
23	Armand Baeyens (BEL)	Belgium Aiglons	+ 1h 47' 39"
24	Paul Giguet (FRA)	France	+ 1h 48' 05"
25	Marcel Hendrickx (BEL)	Belgium	+ 1h 59' 19"
26	Custodio Dos Reis (FRA)	North Africa	+ 1h 59' 58"
27	Wim De Ruyter (NED)	Netherlands	+ 2h 01' 40"
28	Apo Lazaridès (FRA)	France	+ 2h 02' 52"
29	Antonin Rolland (FRA)	South-East	+ 2h 03' 28"
30	Jean Baldassari (FRA)	Paris	+ 2h 05' 01"
31	Marcel Dussault (FRA)	Centre/South-West	+ 2h 09' 58"
32	Maurice De Muer (FRA)	Île-de-France/North-East	+ 2h 11' 38"
33	Gino Sciardis (FRA)	West	+ 2h 13' 30"
34	Raoul Rémy (FRA)	South-East	+ 2h 16' 20"
35	Jean-Marie Goasmat (FRA)	West	+ 2h 19' 14"
36	Pierre Molinéris (FRA)	France	+ 2h 19' 31"
37	Nello Lauredi (FRA)	France	+ 2h 22' 05"
38	Maurice Kallert (FRA)	South-East	+ 2h 23' 29"
39	Roger Creton (FRA)	West	+ 2h 24' 28"
40	Ahmed Kebaili (FRA)	North Africa	+ 2h 27' 17"
41	Georges Aeschlimann (SUI)	Switzerland	+ 2h 34' 05"
42	Serge Blusson (FRA)	Paris	+ 2h 38' 14"
43	Emilio Croci-Torti (SUI)	Switzerland	+ 2h 38' 40"
44	Robert Bonnaventure (FRA)	West	+ 2h 50' 43"
45	Noël Lajoie (FRA)	Centre/South-West	+ 2h 52' 05"
46	Robert Desbats (FRA)	France	+ 2h 56' 27"
47	José Beyaert (FRA)	Paris	+ 3h 12' 07"
48	Émile Baffert (FRA)	France	+ 3h 22' 51"
49	Gilbert Bauvin (FRA)	Île-de-France/North-East	+ 3h 35' 39"
50	Gottfried Weilenmann (SUI)	Switzerland	+ 3h 57' 50"
51	Fritz Zbinden (SUI)	Switzerland	+ 4h 06' 47"

=== Mountains classification ===
Final mountains classification (1–10)
Rank	Rider	Team	Points
1	Louison Bobet (FRA)	France	58
2	Stan Ockers (BEL)	Belgium	42
3	Jean Robic (FRA)	West	41
4	Ferdinand Kübler (SUI)	Switzerland	39
5	Kléber Piot (FRA)	Île-de-France/North-East	36
6	Raphaël Géminiani (FRA)	France	33
7	André Brulé (FRA)	Île-de-France/North-East	19
8	Georges Meunier (FRA)	Centre/South-West	14
9	Raymond Impanis (BEL)	Belgium	12
10	Pierre Brambilla (FRA)	South-East	10

=== Team classification ===
Final team classification
Rank	Team	Time
1	Belgium	438h 54' 21"
2	France	+ 38' 05"
3	Luxembourg	+ 41' 05"
4	Île-de-France/North-East	+ 1h 12' 28"
5	South-East	+ 1h 32' 22"
6	Centre/South-West	+ 1h 53' 16"
7	Belgium Aiglons	+ 2h 01' 34"
8	Switzerland	+ 3h 09' 12"
9	West	+ 3h 28' 56"
10	Paris	+ 5h 51' 48"

== Aftermath ==
The French-Algerian cyclist Zaaf, who fell out in the thirteenth stage after riding into the wrong direction, became famous, and got to ride in many criteriums, until he left two years later to Algeria. Kübler did not enter the next three Tours de France, but when he returned in 1954, he finished in second place, and won the green jersey for the points classification.

== Bibliography ==
- Amels, Wim (1984). De geschiedenis van de Tour de France 1903–1984 (in Dutch). Valkenswaard, Netherlands: Sport-Express. ISBN 978-90-70763-05-3.
- Augendre, Jacques (2016). "Guide historique" [Historical guide] (PDF). Tour de France (in French). Paris: Amaury Sport Organisation. Archived (PDF) from the original on 17 August 2016.
- McGann, Bill; McGann, Carol (2006). The Story of the Tour de France: 1903–1964. Vol. 1. Indianapolis, IN: Dog Ear Publishing. ISBN 978-1-59858-180-5.
- Nauright, John; Parrish, Charles (2012). Sports Around the World: History, Culture, and Practice. Vol. 2. Santa Barbara, CA: ABC-CLIO. ISBN 978-1-59884-300-2.
- Thompson, Christopher S. (2006). The Tour de France: A Cultural History. University of California Press. ISBN 0-520-24760-4.
- Whittle, Jeremy (2003). Le Tour: A Century of the Tour de France. Osceola, WI: MBI Publishing Company. ISBN 978-0-7603-1671-9.
