= List of teams and cyclists in the 1959 Vuelta a España =

For the 1959 Vuelta a España, the field consisted of 90 riders; 41 finished the race.

== By rider ==
Legend
No.	Starting number worn by the rider during the Vuelta
Pos.	Position in the general classification
DNF	Denotes a rider who did not finish

No.	Name	Nationality	Team	Pos.	Ref
1	René Van Meenen	Belgium	Faema Belgium	DNF	
2	Hilaire Couvreur	Belgium	Faema Belgium	7	
3	Friedhelm Fischerkeller	West Germany	Faema Belgium	DNF	
4	Rik Van Looy	Belgium	Faema Belgium	3	
5	Edgard Sorgeloos	Belgium	Faema Belgium	DNF	
6	Hans Junkermann	West Germany	Faema Belgium	15	
7	Frans Van Looveren	Belgium	Faema Belgium	14	
8	Guillaume Michiels	Belgium	Faema Belgium	DNF	
9	Joseph Theuns	Belgium	Faema Belgium	DNF	
10	Joseph Vloebergs	Belgium	Faema Belgium	9	
11	Gilbert Bauvin	France	Saint-Raphaël–Geminiani	DNF	
12	Jean Brankart	Belgium	Saint-Raphaël–Geminiani	DNF	
13	Pierre Everaert	France	Saint-Raphaël–Geminiani	4	
14	René Fournier	France	Saint-Raphaël–Geminiani	DNF	
15	Raphaël Géminiani	France	Saint-Raphaël–Geminiani	DNF	
16	Roger Chaussabel	France	Saint-Raphaël–Geminiani	DNF	
17	René Le Don	France	Saint-Raphaël–Geminiani	DNF	
18	Pierre Machiels	Belgium	Saint-Raphaël–Geminiani	DNF	
19	Roger Rivière	France	Saint-Raphaël–Geminiani	6	
20	Brian Robinson	Great Britain	Saint-Raphaël–Geminiani	DNF	
21	Martins Almeida	Portugal	Portugal	DNF	
22	Antonio Baptista	Portugal	Portugal	DNF	
23	Aquiles Boica	Portugal	Portugal	DNF	
24	José Sousa	Portugal	Portugal	31	
25	Joaquim Gomes	Portugal	Portugal	DNF	
26	José Joaquim Costa	Portugal	Portugal	DNF	
27	Agostinho Ferreira	Portugal	Portugal	DNF	
28	Sérgio Páscoa	Portugal	Portugal	DNF	
29	Joao Dos Santos	Portugal	Portugal	DNF	
30	Joaquim Sousa Santos	Portugal	Portugal	DNF	
31	Guido Boni	Italy	Italy Mixed	17	
32	Dino Bruni	Italy	Italy Mixed	DNF	
33	Michele Gismondi	Italy	Italy Mixed	DNF	
34	Fausto Coppi	Italy	Italy Mixed	DNF	
35	Alessandro Fantini	Italy	Italy Mixed	DNF	
36	Idrio Bui	Italy	Italy Mixed	DNF	
37	Giuliano Michelon	Italy	Italy Mixed	DNF	
38	Pietro Nascimbene	Italy	Italy Mixed	DNF	
39	Carlo Nicolo	Italy	Italy Mixed	DNF	
40	Sante Ranucci	Italy	Italy Mixed	DNF	
41	Jan Adriaensens	Belgium	Peugeot	DNF	
42	Mario Bertolo	France	Peugeot	33	
43	Manuel Busto	France	Peugeot	5	
44	Roger Baens	Belgium	Peugeot	DNF	
45	Claude Colette	France	Peugeot	19	
46	Luis Otaño	Spain	Peugeot	8	
47	Marcel Rohrbach	France	Peugeot	11	
48	Pierre Ruby	France	Peugeot	DNF	
49	Raymond Plaza	France	Peugeot	DNF	
50	Richard Van Genechten	Belgium	Peugeot	26	
51	Fernando Manzaneque	Spain	Licor 43	25	
52	René Marigil	Spain	Licor 43	12	
53	Antonio Suárez	Spain	Licor 43	1	
54	Vicente Iturat	Spain	Licor 43	38	
55	Miguel Bover	Spain	Licor 43	40	
56	Andrés Trobat	Spain	Licor 43	21	
57	Joaquín Barceló	Spain	Licor 43	37	
58	Ángel Guardiola Ortiz	Spain	Licor 43	DNF	
59	Pedro Guzmán	Spain	Licor 43	DNF	
60	Juan Escola	Spain	Licor 43	DNF	
61	Antonio Bertrán Panadés	Spain	Faema Spain	29	
62	Salvador Botella	Spain	Faema Spain	24	
63	Juan Campillo	Spain	Faema Spain	13	
64	Gabriel Company	Spain	Faema Spain	23	
65	Jesús Galdeano	Spain	Faema Spain	10	
66	Jesús Loroño	Spain	Faema Spain	18	
67	Gabriel Mas	Spain	Faema Spain	39	
68	Francisco Moreno Martínez	Spain	Faema Spain	DNF	
69	Aniceto Utset	Spain	Faema Spain	DNF	
70	Miguel Pacheco	Spain	Faema Spain	DNF	
71	Benigno Aspuru	Spain	Kas	27	
72	Federico Bahamontes	Spain	Kas	DNF	
73	Emilio Cruz	Spain	Kas	30	
74	Antonio Karmany	Spain	Kas	22	
75	Carmelo Morales Erostarbe	Spain	Kas	DNF	
76	José Segu	Spain	Kas	2	
77	Antonio Jiménez Quiles	Spain	Kas	34	
78	Manuel Martín Piñera	Spain	Kas	35	
79	José Herrero Berrendero	Spain	Kas	36	
80	Julio San Emeterio	Spain	Kas	20	
81	Antonio Barrutia	Spain	Boxing	DNF	
82	Cosme Barrutia	Spain	Boxing	DNF	
83	Antonio Ferraz Núñez	Spain	Boxing	41	
84	José Urrestarazu	Spain	Boxing	DNF	
85	José Luis Talamillo	Spain	Boxing	16	
86	Santiago Montilla	Spain	Boxing	DNF	
87	Juan Bibiloni Frau	Spain	Boxing	28	
88	José Gómez del Moral	Spain	Boxing	DNF	
89	Jesús Davoz Gorrotxategi	Spain	Boxing	32	
90	Hortensio Vidauretta Garcia	Spain	Boxing	DNF	
