= List of teams and cyclists in the 1958 Vuelta a España =

For the 1958 Vuelta a España, the field consisted of 100 riders; 45 finished the race.

== By rider ==
Legend
| No. | Starting number worn by the rider during the Vuelta |
| Pos. | Position in the general classification |
| DNF | Denotes a rider who did not finish |

| No. | Name | Nationality | Team | Pos. | Ref |
|---|---|---|---|---|---|
| 1 | Jesús Loroño | Spain | Spain | 8 | |
| 2 | Federico Bahamontes | Spain | Spain | 6 | |
| 3 | Fernando Manzaneque | Spain | Spain | 3 | |
| 4 | Salvador Botella | Spain | Spain | 14 | |
| 5 | Gabriel Company | Spain | Spain | 24 | |
| 6 | Jesús Galdeano | Spain | Spain | DNF | |
| 7 | Antonio Jiménez Quiles | Spain | Spain | 25 | |
| 8 | Bernardo Ruiz | Spain | Spain | 26 | |
| 9 | Francisco Moreno Martínez | Spain | Spain | 28 | |
| 10 | Miguel Pacheco | Spain | Spain | 20 | |
| 11 | Joseph Thomin | France | France | DNF | |
| 12 | André Trochut | France | France | DNF | |
| 13 | Raymond Hoorelbeke | France | France | 21 | |
| 14 | Jean Graczyk | France | France | 29 | |
| 15 | Joseph Mirando | France | France | 41 | |
| 16 | René Pavard | France | France | 32 | |
| 17 | Jean Stablinski | France | France | 1 | |
| 18 | Claude Le Ber | France | France | DNF | |
| 19 | François Mahé | France | France | 11 | |
| 20 | Maurice Quentin | France | France | DNF | |
| 21 | Fernando Brandolini | Italy | Italy | DNF | |
| 22 | Emilio Bottecchia | Italy | Italy | DNF | |
| 23 | Giuseppe Buratti | Italy | Italy | DNF | |
| 24 | Guido Carlesi | Italy | Italy | DNF | |
| 25 | Gastone Nencini | Italy | Italy | DNF | |
| 26 | Pierino Baffi | Italy | Italy | 37 | |
| 27 | Cleto Maule | Italy | Italy | DNF | |
| 28 | Mario Tosato | Italy | Italy | DNF | |
| 29 | Benito Romagnoli | Italy | Italy | DNF | |
| 30 | Marcello Pellegrini | Italy | Italy | DNF | |
| 31 | Rik Luyten | Belgium | Belgium | 9 | |
| 32 | Norbert Kerckhove | Belgium | Belgium | DNF | |
| 33 | Hilaire Couvreur | Belgium | Belgium | 4 | |
| 34 | Jan van Gompel | Belgium | Belgium | 22 | |
| 35 | Willy Schroeders | Belgium | Belgium | DNF | |
| 36 | Rik Van Looy | Belgium | Belgium | DNF | |
| 37 | Gilbert Desmet | Belgium | Belgium | 12 | |
| 38 | Leon Vandaele | Belgium | Belgium | DNF | |
| 39 | Roger Verplaetse | Belgium | Belgium | DNF | |
| 40 | Roger Decock | Belgium | Belgium | DNF | |
| 41 | Daan de Groot | Netherlands | Holland | DNF | |
| 42 | Willy Gramser | Netherlands | Holland | DNF | |
| 43 | Jaap Kersten | Netherlands | Holland | DNF | |
| 44 | Jaap Huissoon | Netherlands | Holland | 44 | |
| 45 | Albertus Geldermans | Netherlands | Holland | 40 | |
| 46 | Michel Stolker | Netherlands | Holland | DNF | |
| 47 | Piet Steenvorden | Netherlands | Holland | DNF | |
| 48 | Wim van Est | Netherlands | Holland | 23 | |
| 49 | Leo van der Pluym | Netherlands | Holland | DNF | |
| 50 | Piet de Jongh | Netherlands | Holland | 30 | |
| 51 | Antonio Barbosa Alves | Portugal | Portugal | 16 | |
| 52 | Antonio Baptista | Portugal | Portugal | DNF | |
| 53 | Emilio Pinto | Portugal | Portugal | DNF | |
| 54 | Joaquim Sousa Santos | Portugal | Portugal | DNF | |
| 55 | José Assunção Firmino | Portugal | Portugal | DNF | |
| 56 | Artur Guimarães Coelho | Portugal | Portugal | DNF | |
| 57 | Fernando Silva | Portugal | Portugal | DNF | |
| 58 | José Carlos Pereira Carvalho | Portugal | Portugal | 33 | |
| 59 | Joaquim Gomes | Portugal | Portugal | DNF | |
| 60 | José Sousa | Portugal | Portugal | DNF | |
| 61 | Vicente Iturat | Spain | Peña Solera-Ignis | 17 | |
| 62 | Aniceto Utset | Spain | Peña Solera-Ignis | 36 | |
| 63 | Pasquale Fornara | Italy | Peña Solera-Ignis | 2 | |
| 64 | Alberto Sant Alenta | Spain | Peña Solera-Ignis | DNF | |
| 65 | Renzo Accordi | Italy | Peña Solera-Ignis | 34 | |
| 66 | Jaime Calucho Mestres | Spain | Peña Solera-Ignis | 38 | |
| 67 | Francisco Masip | Spain | Peña Solera-Ignis | DNF | |
| 68 | Juan Campillo | Spain | Peña Solera-Ignis | 13 | |
| 69 | José Segú | Spain | Peña Solera-Ignis | 42 | |
| 70 | Juan Escola | Spain | Peña Solera-Ignis | DNF | |
| 71 | Antonio Barrutia | Spain | Lube | DNF | |
| 72 | Angiolino Piscaglia | Italy | Lube | DNF | |
| 73 | Adolfo Cruz Díaz | Spain | Lube | DNF | |
| 74 | Carmelo Morales Erostarbe | Spain | Lube | DNF | |
| 75 | Antonio Suárez | Spain | Lube | DNF | |
| 76 | Antonio Karmany | Spain | Lube | DNF | |
| 77 | José Gómez del Moral | Spain | Lube | DNF | |
| 78 | René Marigil | Spain | Lube | 19 | |
| 79 | Andrea Carrea | Italy | Lube | 45 | |
| 80 | Renato Ponzini | Italy | Lube | DNF | |
| 81 | Benigno Aspuru | Spain | Kas-Boxing | 10 | |
| 82 | Fausto Iza | Spain | Kas-Boxing | 31 | |
| 83 | Felipe Alberdi | Spain | Kas-Boxing | DNF | |
| 84 | José Luis Talamillo | Spain | Kas-Boxing | DNF | |
| 85 | Antonio Ferraz | Spain | Kas-Boxing | 15 | |
| 86 | Luciano Montero Rechou | Spain | Kas-Boxing | DNF | |
| 87 | José Herrero Berrendero | Spain | Kas-Boxing | 39 | |
| 88 | Manuel Martín Piñera | Spain | Kas-Boxing | 35 | |
| 89 | Julio San Emeterio | Spain | Kas-Boxing | 7 | |
| 90 | Cosme Barrutia | Spain | Kas-Boxing | DNF | |
| 91 | Juan Bibiloni Frau | Spain | Mobilete-Caobania | DNF | |
| 92 | Luis Otaño | Spain | Mobilete-Caobania | 5 | |
| 93 | Gabriel mas Arbona | Spain | Mobilete-Caobania | 18 | |
| 94 | Hortensio Vidauretta Garcia | Spain | Mobilete-Caobania | DNF | |
| 95 | Juan Tomas | Spain | Mobilete-Caobania | DNF | |
| 96 | Andrés Trobat | Spain | Mobilete-Caobania | DNF | |
| 97 | José Urrestarazu | Spain | Mobilete-Caobania | DNF | |
| 98 | Miguel Vidaurreta | Spain | Mobilete-Caobania | DNF | |
| 99 | Raúl Motos Martos | Spain | Mobilete-Caobania | 43 | |
| 100 | Jesús Davoz Gorrotxategi | Spain | Mobilete-Caobania | 27 | |
