= 1958 Vuelta a España, Stage 9 to Stage 16 =

Cycling race stages

The 1958 Vuelta a España was the 13th edition of Vuelta a España, one of cycling's Grand Tours. The Vuelta began in Bilbao on 30 April and Stage 9 occurred on 8 May with a stage from Toledo. The race finished in Madrid on 15 May.

== Stage 9 ==
8 May 1958 - Toledo to Madrid, 241 km (149.8 mi)

Route:

Stage 9 result

Rank	Rider	Team	Time
1	Rik Van Looy (BEL)	Belgium	7h 11' 52"
2	Salvador Botella (ESP)	Spain	+ 30"
3	Antonio Suárez (ESP)	Lube	+ 1' 00"
4	Pasquale Fornara (ITA)	Peña Solera-Ignis	s.t.
5	Juan Campillo (ESP)	Peña Solera-Ignis	s.t.
6	Federico Bahamontes (ESP)	Spain	s.t.
7	Hilaire Couvreur (BEL)	Belgium	s.t.
8	Jean Stablinski (FRA)	France	s.t.
9	Jesús Loroño (ESP)	Spain	s.t.
10	Fernando Manzaneque (ESP)	Spain	s.t.

General classification after Stage 9

Rank	Rider	Team	Time
1	Rik Van Looy (BEL)	Belgium	53h 57' 53"
2	Jean Stablinski (FRA)	France	+ 4"
3	Fernando Manzaneque (ESP)	Spain	+ 4' 09"
4	Pasquale Fornara (ITA)	Peña Solera-Ignis	+ 4' 48"
5	Hilaire Couvreur (BEL)	Belgium	+ 6' 40"
6	Julio San Emeterio (ESP)	Kas–Boxing	+ 11' 47"
7	Federico Bahamontes (ESP)	Spain	+ 12' 25"
8	Jesús Loroño (ESP)	Spain	+ 18' 04"
9	Salvador Botella (ESP)	Spain	+ 18' 53"
10	Gabriel Company (ESP)	Spain	+ 20' 54"

== Stage 10 ==
9 May 1958 - Madrid to Soria, 225 km (139.8 mi)

Route:

Stage 10 result

Rank	Rider	Team	Time
1	Rik Van Looy (BEL)	Belgium	6h 15' 50"
2	Rik Luyten (BEL)	Belgium	+ 30"
3	Gilbert Desmet (BEL)	Belgium	+ 1' 00"
4	Salvador Botella (ESP)	Spain	s.t.
5	Hilaire Couvreur (BEL)	Belgium	s.t.
6	Vicente Iturat (ESP)	Peña Solera-Ignis	s.t.
7	Jean Stablinski (FRA)	France	s.t.
8	Pasquale Fornara (ITA)	Peña Solera-Ignis	s.t.
9	Jean Graczyk (FRA)	France	s.t.
10	Jesús Loroño (ESP)	Spain	s.t.

General classification after Stage 10

Rank	Rider	Team	Time
1	Rik Van Looy (BEL)	Belgium	60h 13' 43"
2	Jean Stablinski (FRA)	France	+ 1' 04"
3	Fernando Manzaneque (ESP)	Spain	+ 4' 25"
4	Pasquale Fornara (ITA)	Peña Solera-Ignis	+ 5' 48"
5	Hilaire Couvreur (BEL)	Belgium	+ 7' 40"
6	Julio San Emeterio (ESP)	Kas–Boxing	+ 13' 09"
7	Federico Bahamontes (ESP)	Spain	+ 13' 41"
8	Jesús Loroño (ESP)	Spain	+ 19' 04"
9	Salvador Botella (ESP)	Spain	+ 19' 53"
10	Gabriel Company (ESP)	Spain	+ 22' 16"

== Stage 11 ==
10 May 1958 - Soria to Vitoria, 167 km (103.8 mi)

Route:

Stage 11 result

Rank	Rider	Team	Time
1	René Marigil (ESP)	Lube	4h 44' 06"
2	Vicente Iturat (ESP)	Peña Solera-Ignis	+ 1' 00"
3	Emilio Bottecchia (ITA)	Italy	+ 1' 30"
4	Piet de Jongh (NED)	Holland	+ 2' 53"
5	Rik Luyten (BEL)	Belgium	+ 3' 03"
6	Jaime Calucho Mestres (ESP)	Peña Solera-Ignis	s.t.
7	François Mahé (FRA)	France	s.t.
8	Jesús Galdeano (ESP)	Spain	+ 3' 20"
9	Gabriel Mas (ESP)	Mobilete-Caobania	+ 6' 01"
10	Julio San Emeterio (ESP)	Kas–Boxing	+ 6' 31"

General classification after Stage 11

Rank	Rider	Team	Time
1	Rik Van Looy (BEL)	Belgium	65h 04' 22"
2	Jean Stablinski (FRA)	France	+ 1' 04"
3	Fernando Manzaneque (ESP)	Spain	+ 4' 25"
4	Pasquale Fornara (ITA)	Peña Solera-Ignis	+ 5' 48"
5	Hilaire Couvreur (BEL)	Belgium	+ 7' 40"
6	Julio San Emeterio (ESP)	Kas–Boxing	+ 13' 05"
7	Federico Bahamontes (ESP)	Spain	+ 13' 41"
8	Jesús Loroño (ESP)	Spain	+ 19' 04"
9	Salvador Botella (ESP)	Spain	+ 19' 53"
10	Rik Luyten (BEL)	Belgium	+ 21' 31"

== Stage 12 ==
11 May 1958 - Vitoria to Bilbao, 169 km (105.0 mi)

Route:

Stage 12 result

Rank	Rider	Team	Time
1	Fausto Iza (ESP)	Kas–Boxing	5h 08' 47"
2	Luis Otaño (ESP)	Mobilete-Caobania	+ 5' 54"
3	Fernando Manzaneque (ESP)	Spain	+ 6' 30"
4	Vicente Iturat (ESP)	Peña Solera-Ignis	+ 6' 39"
5	Julio San Emeterio (ESP)	Kas–Boxing	s.t.
6	Carmelo Morales Erostarbe (ESP)	Lube	s.t.
7	Hilaire Couvreur (BEL)	Belgium	s.t.
8	Jesús Loroño (ESP)	Spain	s.t.
9	Pasquale Fornara (ITA)	Peña Solera-Ignis	s.t.
10	Federico Bahamontes (ESP)	Spain	s.t.

General classification after Stage 12

Rank	Rider	Team	Time
1	Jean Stablinski (FRA)	France	70h 21' 34"
2	Fernando Manzaneque (ESP)	Spain	+ 2' 30"
3	Pasquale Fornara (ITA)	Peña Solera-Ignis	+ 4' 02"
4	Hilaire Couvreur (BEL)	Belgium	+ 5' 54"
5	Julio San Emeterio (ESP)	Kas–Boxing	+ 11' 21"
6	Federico Bahamontes (ESP)	Spain	+ 11' 55"
7	Jesús Loroño (ESP)	Spain	+ 17' 18"
8	Salvador Botella (ESP)	Spain	+ 18' 52"
9	Luis Otaño (ESP)	Mobilete-Caobania	+ 28' 17"
10	Benigno Aspuru (ESP)	Kas–Boxing	+ 34' 25"

== Stage 13a ==
12 May 1958 - Bilbao to Castro Urdiales, 35 km (22 mi) (ITT)

Route:

Stage 13a result

Rank	Rider	Team	Time
1	Guido Carlesi (ITA)	Italy	55' 45"
2	Jesús Loroño (ESP)	Spain	s.t.
3	Pasquale Fornara (ITA)	Peña Solera-Ignis	+ 8"
4	Hilaire Couvreur (BEL)	Belgium	+ 32"
5	Federico Bahamontes (ESP)	Spain	+ 1' 08"
6	Jean Stablinski (FRA)	France	+ 1' 17"
7	Fernando Manzaneque (ESP)	Spain	+ 1' 19"
8	Luis Otaño (ESP)	Mobilete-Caobania	+ 1' 30"
9	Renato Ponzini (ITA)	Lube	+ 1' 42"
10	Antonio Barbosa Alves (POR)	Portugal	+ 1' 51"

== Stage 13b ==
12 May 1958 - Castro Urdiales to Santander, 105 km (65 mi)

Route:

Stage 13b result

Rank	Rider	Team	Time
1	Jean Graczyk (FRA)	France	2h 46' 57"
2	René Marigil (ESP)	Lube	+ 30"
3	José Segú (ESP)	Peña Solera-Ignis	+ 1' 34"
4	Francisco Moreno Martínez (ESP)	Spain	s.t.
5	Miguel Pacheco (ESP)	Spain	s.t.
6	Carmelo Morales Erostarbe (ESP)	Lube	s.t.
7	Jan van Gompel (BEL)	Belgium	+ 3' 27"
8	Rik Luyten (BEL)	Belgium	s.t.
9	Pasquale Fornara (ITA)	Peña Solera-Ignis	s.t.
10	Fernando Manzaneque (ESP)	Spain	s.t.

== Stage 14 ==
13 May 1958 - Santander to Gijón, 221 km (137 mi)

Route:

Stage 14 result

Rank	Rider	Team	Time
1	Pierino Baffi (ITA)	Italy	6h 06' 39"
2	Renato Ponzini (ITA)	Lube	+ 7' 12"
3	Luis Otaño (ESP)	Mobilete-Caobania	+ 7' 42"
4	Jesús Davoz Gorrotxategi (ESP)	Mobilete-Caobania	+ 16' 41"
5	Vicente Iturat (ESP)	Peña Solera-Ignis	s.t.
6	Rik Luyten (BEL)	Belgium	+ 17' 58"
7	Gilbert Desmet (BEL)	Belgium	s.t.
8	Antonio Baptista (POR)	Portugal	+ 18' 01"
9	Antonio Ferraz (ESP)	Kas–Boxing	s.t.
10	Carmelo Morales Erostarbe (ESP)	Lube	s.t.

General classification after Stage 14

Rank	Rider	Team	Time
1	Jean Stablinski (FRA)	France	80h 41' 16"
2	Fernando Manzaneque (ESP)	Spain	+ 2' 29"
3	Pasquale Fornara (ITA)	Peña Solera-Ignis	+ 2' 50"
4	Hilaire Couvreur (BEL)	Belgium	+ 5' 06"
5	Luis Otaño (ESP)	Mobilete-Caobania	+ 10' 05"
6	Federico Bahamontes (ESP)	Spain	+ 11' 43"
7	Julio San Emeterio (ESP)	Kas–Boxing	+ 12' 45"
8	Jesús Loroño (ESP)	Spain	+ 15' 58"
9	Salvador Botella (ESP)	Spain	+ 23' 07"
10	Rik Luyten (BEL)	Belgium	+ 32' 33"

== Stage 15 ==
14 May 1958 - Oviedo to Palencia, 246 km (153 mi)

Route:

Stage 15 result

Rank	Rider	Team	Time
1	Rik Luyten (BEL)	Belgium	7h 08' 27"
2	Wim van Est (NED)	Holland	+ 30"
3	Renzo Accordi (ITA)	Peña Solera-Ignis	+ 1' 00"
4	François Mahé (FRA)	France	s.t.
5	Gilbert Desmet (BEL)	Belgium	s.t.
6	Raymond Hoorelbeke (FRA)	France	s.t.
7	José Carlos Pereira Carvalho (POR)	Portugal	s.t.
8	Pasquale Fornara (ITA)	Peña Solera-Ignis	s.t.
9	Vicente Iturat (ESP)	Peña Solera-Ignis	s.t.
10	Jesús Davoz Gorrotxategi (ESP)	Mobilete-Caobania	s.t.

General classification after Stage 15

Rank	Rider	Team	Time
1	Jean Stablinski (FRA)	France	87h 51' 13"
2	Pasquale Fornara (ITA)	Peña Solera-Ignis	+ 2' 50"
3	Fernando Manzaneque (ESP)	Spain	+ 3' 00"
4	Hilaire Couvreur (BEL)	Belgium	+ 5' 06"
5	Luis Otaño (ESP)	Mobilete-Caobania	+ 10' 35"
6	Federico Bahamontes (ESP)	Spain	+ 11' 43"
7	Julio San Emeterio (ESP)	Kas–Boxing	+ 12' 45"
8	Jesús Loroño (ESP)	Spain	+ 15' 58"
9	Rik Luyten (BEL)	Belgium	+ 30' 33"
10	Benigno Aspuru (ESP)	Kas–Boxing	+ 34' 16"

== Stage 16 ==
15 May 1958 - Palencia to Madrid, 241 km (150 mi)

Route:

Stage 16 result

Rank	Rider	Team	Time
1	Rik Luyten (BEL)	Belgium	7h 00' 48"
2	Pierino Baffi (ITA)	Italy	+ 30"
3	Gilbert Desmet (BEL)	Belgium	+ 1' 02"
4	Miguel Pacheco (ESP)	Spain	+ 1' 04"
5	Vicente Iturat (ESP)	Peña Solera-Ignis	+ 1' 31"
6	René Marigil (ESP)	Lube	s.t.
7	Salvador Botella (ESP)	Spain	s.t.
8	Juan Campillo (ESP)	Peña Solera-Ignis	s.t.
9	Benigno Aspuru (ESP)	Kas–Boxing	+ 1' 41"
10	Francisco Moreno Martínez (ESP)	Spain	+ 1' 48"

General classification after Stage 16

Rank	Rider	Team	Time
1	Jean Stablinski (FRA)	France	94h 54' 21"
2	Pasquale Fornara (ITA)	Peña Solera-Ignis	+ 2' 51"
3	Fernando Manzaneque (ESP)	Spain	+ 3' 01"
4	Hilaire Couvreur (BEL)	Belgium	+ 5' 04"
5	Luis Otaño (ESP)	Mobilete-Caobania	+ 10' 36"
6	Federico Bahamontes (ESP)	Spain	+ 11' 39"
7	Julio San Emeterio (ESP)	Kas–Boxing	+ 13' 16"
8	Jesús Loroño (ESP)	Spain	+ 16' 29"
9	Rik Luyten (BEL)	Belgium	+ 28' 13"
10	Benigno Aspuru (ESP)	Kas–Boxing	+ 33' 37"
