= 1959 Vuelta a España, Stage 1a to Stage 8 =

Cycling race stages

The 1959 Vuelta a España was the 14th edition of Vuelta a España, one of cycling's Grand Tours. The Vuelta began in Madrid with a team time trial on 24 April and Stage 8 occurred on 1 May with a stage to Tortosa. The race finished in Bilbao on 15 May.

== Stage 1a ==
24 April 1959 - Madrid to Madrid, 9 km (5.6 mi) (TTT)

Stage 1a result

Rank	Team	Time
1	Saint-Raphaël–R. Geminiani–Dunlop	34' 03"
2	Peugeot–BP–Dunlop	+ 12"
3	Italy Mixed	+ 15"
4	Kas–Boxing	s.t.
5	Licor 43	+ 29"
6	Faema–Guerra Belgium	+ 30"
7	Faema–Guerra Spain	+ 42"
8	Boxing	+ 1' 09"
9	Portugal	+ 1' 39"

== Stage 1b ==
24 April 1959 - Madrid to Toledo, 114 km (70.8 mi)

Stage 1b result and general classification after Stage 1b

Rank	Rider	Team	Time
1	Rik Van Looy (BEL)	Faema–Guerra Belgium	2h 33' 04"
2	Antonio Suárez (ESP)	Licor 43	+ 30"
3	Federico Bahamontes (ESP)	Kas–Boxing	+ 1' 00"
4	Roger Rivière (FRA)	Saint-Raphaël–R. Geminiani–Dunlop	s.t.
5	José Segu (ESP)	Kas–Boxing	+ 1' 22"
6	Jan Adriaensens (BEL)	Peugeot–BP–Dunlop	+ 1' 25"
7	Emilio Cruz (ESP)	Kas–Boxing	+ 2' 00"
8	Idrio Bui (ITA)	Italy Mixed	s.t.
9	Antonio Karmany (ESP)	Kas–Boxing	s.t.
10	Juan Escola (ESP)	Licor 43	s.t.

== Stage 2 ==
25 April 1959 - Manzanares to Córdoba, 228 km (141.7 mi)

Stage 2 result

Rank	Rider	Team	Time
1	Antonio Karmany (ESP)	Kas–Boxing	5h 56' 31"
2	Juan Campillo (ESP)	Faema–Guerra Spain	+ 33"
3	Edgard Sorgeloos (BEL)	Faema–Guerra Belgium	+ 5' 44"
4	Antonio Barrutia (ESP)	Boxing	s.t.
5	Roger Baens (BEL)	Peugeot–BP–Dunlop	s.t.
6	Frans Van Looveren (BEL)	Faema–Guerra Belgium	s.t.
7	Claude Colette (FRA)	Peugeot–BP–Dunlop	s.t.
8	Emilio Cruz (ESP)	Kas–Boxing	s.t.
9	Joseph Vloebergs (BEL)	Faema–Guerra Belgium	s.t.
10	Francisco Moreno Martínez (ESP)	Faema–Guerra Spain	s.t.

General classification after Stage 2

Rank	Rider	Team	Time
1	Antonio Karmany (ESP)	Kas–Boxing	8h 43' 01"
2	Juan Campillo (ESP)	Faema–Guerra Spain	+ 1' 44"
3	José Segu (ESP)	Kas–Boxing	+ 5' 06"
4	Emilio Cruz (ESP)	Kas–Boxing	+ 5' 44"
5	Rik Van Looy (BEL)	Faema–Guerra Belgium	s.t.
6	Antonio Suárez (ESP)	Licor 43	+ 6' 13"
7	Roger Rivière (FRA)	Saint-Raphaël–R. Geminiani–Dunlop	+ 6' 34"
8	Federico Bahamontes (ESP)	Kas–Boxing	+ 6' 39"
9	Roger Baens (BEL)	Peugeot–BP–Dunlop	+ 6' 43"
10	Frans Van Looveren (BEL)	Faema–Guerra Belgium	+ 6' 49"

== Stage 3 ==
26 April 1959 - Córdoba to Seville, 140 km (87 mi)

Stage 3 result

Rank	Rider	Team	Time
1	Vicente Iturat (ESP)	Licor 43	3h 58' 39"
2	Frans Van Looveren (BEL)	Faema–Guerra Belgium	+ 30"
3	Roger Baens (BEL)	Peugeot–BP–Dunlop	+ 1' 00"
4	Edgard Sorgeloos (BEL)	Faema–Guerra Belgium	s.t.
5	Pierre Everaert (FRA)	Saint-Raphaël–R. Geminiani–Dunlop	+ 1' 02"
6	José Segu (ESP)	Kas–Boxing	s.t.
7	Joseph Vloebergs (BEL)	Faema–Guerra Belgium	s.t.
8	Hilaire Couvreur (BEL)	Faema–Guerra Belgium	s.t.
9	Miguel Bover (ESP)	Licor 43	+ 4' 22"
10	Manuel Martín Piñera (ESP)	Kas–Boxing	s.t.

General classification after Stage 3

Rank	Rider	Team	Time
1	Antonio Karmany (ESP)	Kas–Boxing	12h 46' 02"
2	Juan Campillo (ESP)	Faema–Guerra Spain	+ 1' 44"
3	José Segu (ESP)	Kas–Boxing	+ 1' 46"
4	Frans Van Looveren (BEL)	Faema–Guerra Belgium	+ 2' 57"
5	Roger Baens (BEL)	Peugeot–BP–Dunlop	+ 3' 21"
6	Edgard Sorgeloos (BEL)	Faema–Guerra Belgium	+ 4' 43"
7	Rik Van Looy (BEL)	Faema–Guerra Belgium	+ 5' 44"
8	Emilio Cruz (ESP)	Kas–Boxing	+ 6' 03"
9	Antonio Suárez (ESP)	Licor 43	+ 6' 13"
10	Roger Rivière (FRA)	Saint-Raphaël–R. Geminiani–Dunlop	+ 6' 34"

== Stage 4 ==
27 April 1959 - Seville to Granada, 240 km (150 mi)

Stage 4 result

Rank	Rider	Team	Time
1	Federico Bahamontes (ESP)	Kas–Boxing	6h 17' 22"
2	Fernando Manzaneque (ESP)	Licor 43	+ 1' 23"
3	José Gómez del Moral (ESP)	Boxing	+ 1' 54"
4	Antonio Suárez (ESP)	Licor 43	+ 3' 11"
5	Jesús Galdeano (ESP)	Faema–Guerra Spain	+ 4' 08"
6	Marcel Rohrbach (FRA)	Peugeot–BP–Dunlop	+ 4' 19"
7	Frans Van Looveren (BEL)	Faema–Guerra Belgium	+ 4' 31"
8	Juan Campillo (ESP)	Faema–Guerra Spain	+ 4' 37"
9	Guido Boni (ITA)	Italy Mixed	s.t.
10	Antonio Jiménez Quiles (ESP)	Kas–Boxing	+ 4' 38"

== Stage 5 ==
28 April 1959 - Guadix to Murcia, 225 km (140 mi)

Route:

Stage 5 result

Rank	Rider	Team	Time
1	Antonio Suárez (ESP)	Licor 43	6h 00' 23"
2	Roger Baens (BEL)	Peugeot–BP–Dunlop	+ 59"
3	Rik Van Looy (BEL)	Faema–Guerra Belgium	+ 1' 29"
4	Salvador Botella (ESP)	Faema–Guerra Spain	+ 1' 31"
5	Roger Rivière (FRA)	Saint-Raphaël–R. Geminiani–Dunlop	s.t.
6	Hans Junkermann (FRG)	Faema–Guerra Belgium	+ 1' 33"
7	Frans Van Looveren (BEL)	Faema–Guerra Belgium	+ 1' 52"
8	Hilaire Couvreur (BEL)	Faema–Guerra Belgium	+ 1' 53"
9	Richard Van Genechten (BEL)	Peugeot–BP–Dunlop	s.t.
10	René Van Meenen (BEL)	Faema–Guerra Belgium	s.t.

General classification after Stage 5

Rank	Rider	Team	Time
1	Antonio Karmany (ESP)	Kas–Boxing	25h 11' 24"
2	Federico Bahamontes (ESP)	Kas–Boxing	+ 55"
3	Roger Baens (BEL)	Peugeot–BP–Dunlop	+ 1' 31"
4	Juan Campillo (ESP)	Faema–Guerra Spain	+ 1' 35"
5	Frans Van Looveren (BEL)	Faema–Guerra Belgium	+ 1' 42"
6	Antonio Suárez (ESP)	Licor 43	+ 1' 47"
7	Rik Van Looy (BEL)	Faema–Guerra Belgium	+ 4' 22"
8	Edgard Sorgeloos (BEL)	Faema–Guerra Belgium	+ 4' 43"
9	Roger Rivière (FRA)	Saint-Raphaël–R. Geminiani–Dunlop	+ 5' 14"
10	Fernando Manzaneque (ESP)	Licor 43	+ 5' 45"

== Stage 6 ==
29 April 1959 - Murcia to Alicante, 173 km (107 mi)

Route:

Stage 6 result

Rank	Rider	Team	Time
1	Gabriel Mas (ESP)	Faema–Guerra Spain	4h 29' 59"
2	Rik Van Looy (BEL)	Faema–Guerra Belgium	+ 11' 31"
3	Antonio Suárez (ESP)	Licor 43	+ 12' 01"
4	Vicente Iturat (ESP)	Licor 43	s.t.
5	Frans Van Looveren (BEL)	Faema–Guerra Belgium	s.t.
6	Pierre Machiels (BEL)	Saint-Raphaël–R. Geminiani–Dunlop	s.t.
7	Salvador Botella (ESP)	Faema–Guerra Spain	s.t.
8	Antonio Barrutia (ESP)	Boxing	s.t.
9	Guido Boni (ITA)	Italy Mixed	s.t.
10	Roger Baens (BEL)	Peugeot–BP–Dunlop	s.t.

General classification after Stage 6

Rank	Rider	Team	Time
1	Antonio Karmany (ESP)	Kas–Boxing	29h 53' 24"
2	Federico Bahamontes (ESP)	Kas–Boxing	+ 55"
3	Roger Baens (BEL)	Peugeot–BP–Dunlop	+ 1' 29"
4	Juan Campillo (ESP)	Faema–Guerra Spain	+ 1' 35"
5	Frans Van Looveren (BEL)	Faema–Guerra Belgium	+ 1' 43"
6	Antonio Suárez (ESP)	Licor 43	+ 1' 47"
7	Rik Van Looy (BEL)	Faema–Guerra Belgium	+ 3' 52"
8	Edgard Sorgeloos (BEL)	Faema–Guerra Belgium	+ 5' 08"
9	Roger Rivière (FRA)	Saint-Raphaël–R. Geminiani–Dunlop	+ 5' 14"
10	Fernando Manzaneque (ESP)	Licor 43	+ 5' 45"

== Stage 7 ==
30 April 1959 - Alicante to Castellón, 233 km (145 mi)

Route:

Stage 7 result

Rank	Rider	Team	Time
1	Antonio Barrutia (ESP)	Boxing	7h 10' 35"
2	José Luis Talamillo (ESP)	Boxing	+ 30"
3	René Marigil (ESP)	Licor 43	+ 1' 00"
4	René Van Meenen (BEL)	Faema–Guerra Belgium	s.t.
5	Joseph Vloebergs (BEL)	Faema–Guerra Belgium	s.t.
6	Roger Chaussabel (FRA)	Saint-Raphaël–R. Geminiani–Dunlop	s.t.
7	José Gómez del Moral (ESP)	Boxing	s.t.
8	Pierre Everaert (FRA)	Saint-Raphaël–R. Geminiani–Dunlop	s.t.
9	Marcel Rohrbach (FRA)	Peugeot–BP–Dunlop	+ 1' 12"
10	José Segu (ESP)	Kas–Boxing	+ 6' 33"

General classification after Stage 7

Rank	Rider	Team	Time
1	Joseph Vloebergs (BEL)	Faema–Guerra Belgium	37h 10' 45"
2	José Gómez del Moral (ESP)	Boxing	+ 42"
3	Marcel Rohrbach (FRA)	Peugeot–BP–Dunlop	+ 3' 57"
4	Antonio Barrutia (ESP)	Boxing	+ 5' 02"
5	René Marigil (ESP)	Licor 43	+ 5' 17"
6	José Segu (ESP)	Kas–Boxing	+ 6' 53"
7	Pierre Everaert (FRA)	Saint-Raphaël–R. Geminiani–Dunlop	+ 8' 02"
8	René Van Meenen (BEL)	Faema–Guerra Belgium	+ 8' 43"
9	José Luis Talamillo (ESP)	Boxing	+ 13' 13"
10	Luis Otaño (ESP)	Peugeot–BP–Dunlop	+ 18' 32"

== Stage 8 ==
1 May 1959 - Castellón to Tortosa, 130 km (81 mi)

Route:

Stage 8 result

Rank	Rider	Team	Time
1	Rik Van Looy (BEL)	Faema–Guerra Belgium	3h 00' 01"
2	Vicente Iturat (ESP)	Licor 43	+ 30"
3	Alessandro Fantini (ITA)	Italy Mixed	+ 1' 00"
4	Dino Bruni (ITA)	Italy Mixed	s.t.
5	Gilbert Bauvin (FRA)	Saint-Raphaël–R. Geminiani–Dunlop	s.t.
6	Antonio Bertrán Panadés (ESP)	Faema–Guerra Spain	s.t.
7	Juan Escola (ESP)	Licor 43	s.t.
8	Edgard Sorgeloos (BEL)	Faema–Guerra Belgium	s.t.
9	Luis Otaño (ESP)	Peugeot–BP–Dunlop	s.t.
10	Roger Rivière (FRA)	Saint-Raphaël–R. Geminiani–Dunlop	s.t.

General classification after Stage 8

Rank	Rider	Team	Time
1	Pierre Everaert (FRA)	Saint-Raphaël–R. Geminiani–Dunlop	40h 19' 48"
2	Joseph Vloebergs (BEL)	Faema–Guerra Belgium	+ 2' 42"
3	José Gómez del Moral (ESP)	Boxing	+ 3' 23"
4	Marcel Rohrbach (FRA)	Peugeot–BP–Dunlop	+ 6' 39"
5	Antonio Barrutia (ESP)	Boxing	+ 7' 44"
6	René Marigil (ESP)	Licor 43	+ 7' 54"
7	José Segu (ESP)	Kas–Boxing	+ 9' 35"
8	Luis Otaño (ESP)	Peugeot–BP–Dunlop	+ 10' 30"
9	René Van Meenen (BEL)	Faema–Guerra Belgium	+ 11' 25"
10	José Luis Talamillo (ESP)	Boxing	+ 15' 55"
