= 1959 Vuelta a España, Stage 9 to Stage 17 =

Cycling race stages

The 1959 Vuelta a España was the 14th edition of Vuelta a España, one of cycling's Grand Tours. The Vuelta began in Madrid with a team time trial on 24 April and Stage 9 occurred on 2 May with a stage from Tortosa. The race finished in Bilbao on 15 May.

== Stage 9 ==
2 May 1959 - Tortosa to Barcelona, 196 km (121.8 mi)

Route:

Stage 9 result

Rank	Rider	Team	Time
1	Rik Van Looy (BEL)	Faema–Guerra Belgium	4h 50' 44"
2	Vicente Iturat (ESP)	Licor 43	+ 40"
3	Gilbert Bauvin (FRA)	Saint-Raphaël–R. Geminiani–Dunlop	+ 1' 10"
4	Salvador Botella (ESP)	Faema–Guerra Spain	s.t.
5	Frans Van Looveren (BEL)	Faema–Guerra Belgium	s.t.
6	Miguel Bover (ESP)	Licor 43	s.t.
7	José Segu (ESP)	Kas–Boxing	s.t.
8	José Luis Talamillo (ESP)	Boxing	s.t.
9	Michele Gismondi (ITA)	Italy Mixed	s.t.
10	Richard Van Genechten (BEL)	Peugeot–BP–Dunlop	s.t.

General classification after Stage 9

Rank	Rider	Team	Time
1	Pierre Everaert (FRA)	Saint-Raphaël–R. Geminiani–Dunlop	45h 11' 42"
2	Joseph Vloebergs (BEL)	Faema–Guerra Belgium	+ 2' 55"
3	José Gómez del Moral (ESP)	Boxing	+ 3' 49"
4	Marcel Rohrbach (FRA)	Peugeot–BP–Dunlop	+ 6' 39"
5	José Segu (ESP)	Kas–Boxing	+ 9' 35"
6	Luis Otaño (ESP)	Peugeot–BP–Dunlop	+ 10' 30"
7	Antonio Barrutia (ESP)	Boxing	+ 11' 01"
8	René Marigil (ESP)	Licor 43	+ 11' 16"
9	José Luis Talamillo (ESP)	Boxing	+ 15' 55"
10	Rik Van Looy (BEL)	Faema–Guerra Belgium	+ 17' 06"

== Stage 10 ==
3 May 1959 - Granollers to Lleida, 183 km (113.7 mi)

Route:

Stage 10 result

Rank	Rider	Team	Time
1	Antonio Suárez (ESP)	Licor 43	5h 13' 50"
2	Raphaël Géminiani (FRA)	Saint-Raphaël–R. Geminiani–Dunlop	+ 30"
3	Frans Van Looveren (BEL)	Faema–Guerra Belgium	+ 1' 00"
4	Jesús Galdeano (ESP)	Faema–Guerra Spain	s.t.
5	Guido Boni (ITA)	Italy Mixed	s.t.
6	Julio San Emeterio (ESP)	Kas–Boxing	s.t.
7	Andrés Trobat (ESP)	Licor 43	s.t.
8	Juan Escola (ESP)	Licor 43	s.t.
9	René Van Meenen (BEL)	Faema–Guerra Belgium	s.t.
10	Hilaire Couvreur (BEL)	Faema–Guerra Belgium	s.t.

General classification after Stage 10

Rank	Rider	Team	Time
1	Pierre Everaert (FRA)	Saint-Raphaël–R. Geminiani–Dunlop	50h 42' 59"
2	René Van Meenen (BEL)	Faema–Guerra Belgium	+ 3' 53"
3	Joseph Vloebergs (BEL)	Faema–Guerra Belgium	+ 3' 55"
4	José Gómez del Moral (ESP)	Boxing	+ 4' 21"
5	Hilaire Couvreur (BEL)	Faema–Guerra Belgium	+ 4' 54"
6	Marcel Rohrbach (FRA)	Peugeot–BP–Dunlop	+ 6' 39"
7	José Segu (ESP)	Kas–Boxing	+ 9' 35"
8	Luis Otaño (ESP)	Peugeot–BP–Dunlop	+ 10' 30"
9	Frans Van Looveren (BEL)	Faema–Guerra Belgium	+ 11' 14"
10	René Marigil (ESP)	Licor 43	+ 13' 16"

== Stage 11 ==
4 May 1959 - Lleida to Pamplona, 242 km (150.4 mi)

Route:

Stage 11 result

Rank	Rider	Team	Time
1	Rik Van Looy (BEL)	Faema–Guerra Belgium	6h 08' 38"
2	Antonio Suárez (ESP)	Licor 43	+ 31"
3	Manuel Busto (FRA)	Peugeot–BP–Dunlop	+ 1' 03"
4	José Segu (ESP)	Kas–Boxing	+ 1' 11"
5	Jesús Galdeano (ESP)	Faema–Guerra Spain	+ 5' 53"
6	Roger Rivière (FRA)	Saint-Raphaël–R. Geminiani–Dunlop	+ 17' 07"
7	Jesús Loroño (ESP)	Faema–Guerra Spain	s.t.
8	Pierre Everaert (FRA)	Saint-Raphaël–R. Geminiani–Dunlop	+ 18' 36"
9	Hans Junkermann (FRG)	Faema–Guerra Belgium	+ 23' 28"
10	Juan Campillo (ESP)	Faema–Guerra Spain	+ 23' 29"

== Stage 12 ==
5 May 1959 - Pamplona to San Sebastián, 210 km (130.5 mi)

Route:

Stage 12 result

Rank	Rider	Team	Time
1	José Carlos Sousa Cardoso (ESP)	Licor 43	6h 00' 40"
2	Edgard Sorgeloos (BEL)	Faema–Guerra Belgium	+ 2' 23"
3	Raphaël Géminiani (FRA)	Saint-Raphaël–R. Geminiani–Dunlop	+ 2' 53"
4	Gabriel Company (ESP)	Faema–Guerra Spain	s.t.
5	Hilaire Couvreur (BEL)	Faema–Guerra Belgium	+ 2' 55"
6	Juan Campillo (ESP)	Faema–Guerra Spain	+ 2' 58"
7	Guido Boni (ITA)	Italy Mixed	+ 4' 27"
8	Rik Van Looy (BEL)	Faema–Guerra Belgium	+ 4' 31"
9	Frans Van Looveren (BEL)	Faema–Guerra Belgium	s.t.
10	Salvador Botella (ESP)	Faema–Guerra Spain	s.t.

General classification after Stage 12

Rank	Rider	Team	Time
1	José Segu (ESP)	Kas–Boxing	63h 07' 34"
2	Antonio Suárez (ESP)	Licor 43	+ 3' 20"
3	Rik Van Looy (BEL)	Faema–Guerra Belgium	+ 6' 20"
4	Pierre Everaert (FRA)	Saint-Raphaël–R. Geminiani–Dunlop	+ 7' 50"
5	Manuel Busto (FRA)	Peugeot–BP–Dunlop	+ 13' 36"
6	Joseph Vloebergs (BEL)	Faema–Guerra Belgium	+ 20' 56"
7	Hilaire Couvreur (BEL)	Faema–Guerra Belgium	+ 21' 19"
8	Marcel Rohrbach (FRA)	Peugeot–BP–Dunlop	+ 24' 40"
9	René Van Meenen (BEL)	Faema–Guerra Belgium	+ 24' 51"
10	Jesús Galdeano (ESP)	Faema–Guerra Spain	+ 26' 46"

== Stage 13 ==
6 May 1959 - San Sebastián to San Sebastián, 9 km (5.6 mi) (TTT)

Route:

Stage 13 result

Rank	Team	Time
1	Saint-Raphaël–R. Geminiani–Dunlop	13' 45"
2	Faema–Guerra Belgium	+ 9"
3	Licor 43	+ 28"
4	Kas–Boxing	s.t.
5	Italy Mixed	+ 36"
6	Faema–Guerra Spain	
7	Peugeot–BP–Dunlop	
8	Boxing	

== Stage 14 ==
7 May 1959 - Eibar to Vitoria, 62 km (39 mi) (ITT)

Route:

Stage 14 result

Rank	Rider	Team	Time
1	Roger Rivière (FRA)	Saint-Raphaël–R. Geminiani–Dunlop	1h 51' 44"
2	Antonio Suárez (ESP)	Licor 43	+ 2' 24"
3	Luis Otaño (ESP)	Peugeot–BP–Dunlop	+ 3' 26"
4	Rik Van Looy (BEL)	Faema–Guerra Belgium	+ 6' 46"
5	José Segu (ESP)	Kas–Boxing	+ 6' 50"
6	Julio San Emeterio (ESP)	Kas–Boxing	+ 8' 02"
7	Pierre Everaert (FRA)	Saint-Raphaël–R. Geminiani–Dunlop	+ 8' 43"
8	Hilaire Couvreur (BEL)	Faema–Guerra Belgium	+ 8' 52"
9	Jean Brankart (BEL)	Saint-Raphaël–R. Geminiani–Dunlop	+ 9' 00"
10	Benigno Aspuru (ESP)	Kas–Boxing	+ 9' 05"

General classification after Stage 14

Rank	Rider	Team	Time
1	Antonio Suárez (ESP)	Licor 43	65h 18' 53"
2	José Segu (ESP)	Kas–Boxing	+ 1' 06"
3	Rik Van Looy (BEL)	Faema–Guerra Belgium	+ 5' 19"
4	Pierre Everaert (FRA)	Saint-Raphaël–R. Geminiani–Dunlop	+ 10' 43"
5	Manuel Busto (FRA)	Peugeot–BP–Dunlop	+ 18' 22"
6	Roger Rivière (FRA)	Saint-Raphaël–R. Geminiani–Dunlop	+ 20' 19"
7	Hilaire Couvreur (BEL)	Faema–Guerra Belgium	+ 24' 24"
8	Luis Otaño (ESP)	Peugeot–BP–Dunlop	+ 26' 34"
9	Joseph Vloebergs (BEL)	Faema–Guerra Belgium	+ 27' 17"
10	Marcel Rohrbach (FRA)	Peugeot–BP–Dunlop	+ 28' 27"

== Stage 15 ==
8 May 1959 - Vitoria to Santander, 230 km (140 mi)

Route:

Stage 15 result

Rank	Rider	Team	Time
1	Julio San Emeterio (ESP)	Kas–Boxing	6h 31' 54"
2	Juan Campillo (ESP)	Faema–Guerra Spain	+ 31"
3	Rik Van Looy (BEL)	Faema–Guerra Belgium	+ 12' 11"
4	Frans Van Looveren (BEL)	Faema–Guerra Belgium	s.t.
5	Jean Brankart (BEL)	Saint-Raphaël–R. Geminiani–Dunlop	s.t.
6	Antonio Bertrán Panadés (ESP)	Faema–Guerra Spain	s.t.
7	Salvador Botella (ESP)	Faema–Guerra Spain	s.t.
8	Brian Robinson (GBR)	Saint-Raphaël–R. Geminiani–Dunlop	s.t.
9	Guido Boni (ITA)	Italy Mixed	s.t.
10	Richard Van Genechten (BEL)	Peugeot–BP–Dunlop	s.t.

General classification after Stage 15

Rank	Rider	Team	Time
1	Antonio Suárez (ESP)	Licor 43	72h 02' 58"
2	José Segu (ESP)	Kas–Boxing	+ 1' 06"
3	Rik Van Looy (BEL)	Faema–Guerra Belgium	+ 7' 19"
4	Pierre Everaert (FRA)	Saint-Raphaël–R. Geminiani–Dunlop	+ 10' 43"
5	Manuel Busto (FRA)	Peugeot–BP–Dunlop	+ 18' 58"
6	Roger Rivière (FRA)	Saint-Raphaël–R. Geminiani–Dunlop	+ 20' 59"
7	Hilaire Couvreur (BEL)	Faema–Guerra Belgium	+ 24' 24"
8	Luis Otaño (ESP)	Peugeot–BP–Dunlop	+ 26' 34"
9	Joseph Vloebergs (BEL)	Faema–Guerra Belgium	+ 27' 17"
10	Marcel Rohrbach (FRA)	Peugeot–BP–Dunlop	+ 28' 27"

== Stage 16 ==
9 May 1959 - Santander to Bilbao, 187 km (116 mi)

Route:

Stage 16 result

Rank	Rider	Team	Time
1	Roger Rivière (FRA)	Saint-Raphaël–R. Geminiani–Dunlop	5h 30' 39"
2	Pierre Everaert (FRA)	Saint-Raphaël–R. Geminiani–Dunlop	+ 30"
3	Jesús Galdeano (ESP)	Faema–Guerra Spain	+ 1' 00"
4	Manuel Busto (FRA)	Peugeot–BP–Dunlop	s.t.
5	Rik Van Looy (BEL)	Faema–Guerra Belgium	+ 3' 29"
6	Frans Van Looveren (BEL)	Faema–Guerra Belgium	s.t.
7	Luis Otaño (ESP)	Peugeot–BP–Dunlop	s.t.
8	Jean Brankart (BEL)	Saint-Raphaël–R. Geminiani–Dunlop	s.t.
9	Juan Bibiloni Frau (ESP)	Italy Mixed	s.t.
10	Antonio Karmany (ESP)	Kas–Boxing	s.t.

General classification after Stage 16

Rank	Rider	Team	Time
1	Antonio Suárez (ESP)	Licor 43	77h 37' 06"
2	José Segu (ESP)	Kas–Boxing	+ 1' 06"
3	Rik Van Looy (BEL)	Faema–Guerra Belgium	+ 7' 19"
4	Pierre Everaert (FRA)	Saint-Raphaël–R. Geminiani–Dunlop	+ 7' 44"
5	Manuel Busto (FRA)	Peugeot–BP–Dunlop	+ 16' 29"
6	Roger Rivière (FRA)	Saint-Raphaël–R. Geminiani–Dunlop	+ 17' 30"
7	Hilaire Couvreur (BEL)	Faema–Guerra Belgium	+ 24' 24"
8	Luis Otaño (ESP)	Peugeot–BP–Dunlop	+ 26' 34"
9	Joseph Vloebergs (BEL)	Faema–Guerra Belgium	+ 27' 17"
10	Marcel Rohrbach (FRA)	Peugeot–BP–Dunlop	+ 28' 27"

== Stage 17 ==
10 May 1959 - Bilbao to Bilbao, 222 km (138 mi)

Route:

Stage 17 result

Rank	Rider	Team	Time
1	Fernando Manzaneque (ESP)	Licor 43	6h 52' 11"
2	Jesús Loroño (ESP)	Faema–Guerra Spain	+ 5' 15"
3	Benigno Aspuru (ESP)	Kas–Boxing	+ 5' 45"
4	Rik Van Looy (BEL)	Faema–Guerra Belgium	+ 7' 03"
5	Antonio Suárez (ESP)	Licor 43	s.t.
6	René Marigil (ESP)	Licor 43	s.t.
7	Hans Junkermann (FRG)	Faema–Guerra Belgium	s.t.
8	Hilaire Couvreur (BEL)	Faema–Guerra Belgium	s.t.
9	Juan Bibiloni Frau (ESP)	Italy Mixed	s.t.
10	Julio San Emeterio (ESP)	Kas–Boxing	s.t.

General classification after Stage 17

Rank	Rider	Team	Time
1	Antonio Suárez (ESP)	Licor 43	84h 36' 20"
2	José Segu (ESP)	Kas–Boxing	+ 1' 06"
3	Rik Van Looy (BEL)	Faema–Guerra Belgium	+ 7' 19"
4	Pierre Everaert (FRA)	Saint-Raphaël–R. Geminiani–Dunlop	+ 7' 44"
5	Manuel Busto (FRA)	Peugeot–BP–Dunlop	+ 16' 29"
6	Roger Rivière (FRA)	Saint-Raphaël–R. Geminiani–Dunlop	+ 17' 30"
7	Hilaire Couvreur (BEL)	Faema–Guerra Belgium	+ 24' 24"
8	Luis Otaño (ESP)	Peugeot–BP–Dunlop	+ 26' 34"
9	Joseph Vloebergs (BEL)	Faema–Guerra Belgium	+ 27' 37"
10	Jesús Galdeano (ESP)	Faema–Guerra Spain	+ 29' 40"
