= 1958 Vuelta a España, Stage 1 to Stage 8 =

Cycling race stages

The 1958 Vuelta a España was the 13th edition of Vuelta a España, one of cycling's Grand Tours. The Vuelta began in Bilbao on 30 April and Stage 8 occurred on 7 May with a stage to Toledo. The race finished in Madrid on 15 May.

== Stage 1 ==
30 April 1958 - Bilbao to San Sebastián, 164 km (101.9 mi)

Route:

Stage 1 result and General Classification after Stage 1

Rank	Rider	Team	Time
1	Miguel Pacheco (ESP)	Spain	4h 31' 06"
2	Antonio Barbosa Alves (POR)	Portugal	+ 30"
3	Rik Van Looy (BEL)	Belgium	+ 7' 17"
4	Salvador Botella (ESP)	Spain	s.t.
5	Federico Bahamontes (ESP)	Spain	s.t.
6	Daan de Groot (NED)	Holland	s.t.
7	Hilaire Couvreur (BEL)	Belgium	s.t.
8	José Sousa Cardoso (POR)	Portugal	s.t.
9	Antonio Suárez (ESP)	Lube	s.t.
10	Fernando Manzaneque (ESP)	Spain	s.t.

== Stage 2 ==
1 May 1958 - San Sebastián to Pamplona, 150 km (93.2 mi)

Route:

Stage 2 result

Rank	Rider	Team	Time
1	Antonio Jiménez Quiles (ESP)	Spain	4h 39' 47"
2	Salvador Botella (ESP)	Spain	+ 3' 28"
3	Gabriel Mas (ESP)	Mobilete-Caobania	+ 3' 58"
4	Rik Luyten (BEL)	Belgium	s.t.
5	Michel Stolker (NED)	Holland	s.t.
6	Hilaire Couvreur (BEL)	Belgium	s.t.
7	Maurice Quentin (FRA)	France	s.t.
8	Fernando Manzaneque (ESP)	Spain	s.t.
9	René Marigil (ESP)	Lube	s.t.
10	Carmelo Morales Erostarbe (ESP)	Lube	s.t.

General classification after Stage 2

Rank	Rider	Team	Time
1	Miguel Pacheco (ESP)	Spain	9h 14' 51"
2	Salvador Botella (ESP)	Spain	+ 1' 47"
3	Hilaire Couvreur (BEL)	Belgium	+ 2' 17"
4	Federico Bahamontes (ESP)	Spain	s.t.
5	Fernando Manzaneque (ESP)	Spain	s.t.
6	Antonio Barbosa Alves (POR)	Portugal	+ 3' 09"
7	Carmelo Morales Erostarbe (ESP)	Lube	+ 3' 34"
8	Antonio Jiménez Quiles (ESP)	Spain	+ 4' 38"
9	Michel Stolker (NED)	Holland	+ 4' 52"
10	Maurice Quentin (FRA)	France	s.t.

== Stage 3 ==
2 May 1958 - Pamplona to Zaragoza, 245 km (152 mi)

Route:

Stage 3 result

Rank	Rider	Team	Time
1	Pierino Baffi (ITA)	Italy	6h 59' 25"
2	Jaap Kersten (NED)	Holland	+ 2' 26"
3	Vicente Iturat (ESP)	Peña Solera-Ignis	+ 7' 13"
4	Cleto Maule (ITA)	Italy	s.t.
5	Rik Luyten (BEL)	Belgium	s.t.
6	Antonio Suárez (ESP)	Lube	s.t.
7	François Mahé (FRA)	France	s.t.
8	Jean Stablinski (FRA)	France	s.t.
9	Juan Bibiloni Frau (ESP)	Mobilete-Caobania	+ 7' 20"
10	Roger Decock (BEL)	Belgium	+ 7' 43"

General classification after Stage 3

Rank	Rider	Team	Time
1	Hilaire Couvreur (BEL)	Belgium	16h 25' 08"
2	Federico Bahamontes (ESP)	Spain	s.t.
3	Antonio Barbosa Alves (POR)	Portugal	+ 50"
4	Antonio Suárez (ESP)	Lube	+ 1' 17"
5	Jesús Loroño (ESP)	Spain	+ 2' 50"
6	Benigno Aspuru (ESP)	Kas–Boxing	+ 3' 54"
7	François Mahé (FRA)	France	+ 4' 37"
8	Jean Stablinski (FRA)	France	s.t.
9	Pasquale Fornara (ITA)	Peña Solera-Ignis	+ 5' 12"
10	Rik Luyten (BEL)	Belgium	+ 7' 45"

== Stage 4 ==
3 May 1958 - Zaragoza to Barcelona, 229 km (142 mi)

Route:

Stage 4 result

Rank	Rider	Team	Time
1	Rik Van Looy (BEL)	Belgium	6h 30' 24"
2	Salvador Botella (ESP)	Spain	+ 30"
3	Rik Luyten (BEL)	Belgium	+ 1' 00"
4	Gilbert Desmet (BEL)	Belgium	s.t.
5	René Marigil (ESP)	Lube	s.t.
6	Gabriel Mas (ESP)	Mobilete-Caobania	s.t.
7	Luis Otaño (ESP)	Mobilete-Caobania	+ 1' 51"
8	Fernando Manzaneque (ESP)	Spain	s.t.
9	Leon Vandaele (BEL)	Belgium	+ 2' 00"
10	Benito Romagnoli (ITA)	Italy	s.t.

General classification after Stage 4

Rank	Rider	Team	Time
1	Jean Stablinski (FRA)	France	23h 02' 09"
2	Pasquale Fornara (ITA)	Peña Solera-Ignis	+ 35"
3	Rik Luyten (BEL)	Belgium	+ 2' 13"
4	Hilaire Couvreur (BEL)	Belgium	+ 2' 25"
5	Julio San Emeterio (ESP)	Kas–Boxing	+ 6' 32"
6	François Mahé (FRA)	France	+ 7' 06"
7	Federico Bahamontes (ESP)	Spain	+ 8' 14"
8	Antonio Suárez (ESP)	Lube	+ 8' 37"
9	Fernando Manzaneque (ESP)	Spain	+ 8' 54"
10	Antonio Barbosa Alves (POR)	Portugal	+ 11' 53"

== Stage 5a ==
4 May 1958 - Barcelona to Barcelona, 4 km (2.5 mi) (TTT)

Stage 5a result

Rank	Team	Time
1	France	5' 31"
2	Spain	+ 5"
3	Peña Solera-Ignis	+ 7"
4	Belgium	s.t.
5	Italy	+ 11"

== Stage 5b ==
4 May 1958 - Barcelona to Tarragona, 119 km (74 mi)

Stage 5b result

Rank	Rider	Team	Time
1	Rik Van Looy (BEL)	Belgium	3h 03' 41"
2	Guido Carlesi (ITA)	Italy	+ 30"
3	Salvador Botella (ESP)	Spain	s.t.
4	Vicente Iturat (ESP)	Peña Solera-Ignis	s.t.
5	Jesús Loroño (ESP)	Spain	s.t.
6	Federico Bahamontes (ESP)	Spain	s.t.
7	Fernando Manzaneque (ESP)	Spain	s.t.
8	Gabriel Company (ESP)	Spain	s.t.
9	Jesús Galdeano (ESP)	Spain	s.t.
10	Antonio Jiménez Quiles (ESP)	Spain	s.t.

General classification after Stage 5b

Rank	Rider	Team	Time
1	Jean Stablinski (FRA)	France	26h 12' 21"
2	Pasquale Fornara (ITA)	Peña Solera-Ignis	+ 42"
3	Hilaire Couvreur (BEL)	Belgium	+ 2' 34"
4	Rik Luyten (BEL)	Belgium	+ 3' 03"
5	Julio San Emeterio (ESP)	Kas–Boxing	+ 7' 02"
6	François Mahé (FRA)	France	+ 7' 06"
7	Federico Bahamontes (ESP)	Spain	+ 8' 19"
8	Fernando Manzaneque (ESP)	Spain	+ 9' 19"
9	Antonio Suárez (ESP)	Lube	+ 9' 29"
10	Antonio Barbosa Alves (POR)	Portugal	+ 12' 12"

== Stage 6 ==
5 May 1958 - Tarragona to Valencia, 263 km (163 mi)

Stage 6 result

Rank	Rider	Team	Time
1	Rik Van Looy (BEL)	Belgium	6h 27' 51"
2	Gilbert Desmet (BEL)	Belgium	+ 30"
3	Roger Verplaetse (BEL)	Belgium	+ 1' 02"
4	Gastone Nencini (ITA)	Italy	s.t.
5	Fernando Brandolini (ITA)	Italy	+ 1' 06"
6	Daan de Groot (NED)	Holland	+ 1' 09"
7	Leo van der Pluym (NED)	Holland	+ 1' 13"
8	Maurice Quentin (FRA)	France	+ 7' 29"
9	Raymond Hoorelbeke (FRA)	France	s.t.
10	Alberto Sant Alenta (ESP)	Peña Solera-Ignis	+ 8' 44"

== Stage 7 ==
6 May 1958 - Valencia to Cuenca, 216 km (134 mi)

Route:

Stage 7 result

Rank	Rider	Team	Time
1	Gilbert Desmet (BEL)	Belgium	7h 00' 48"
2	Rik Van Looy (BEL)	Belgium	+ 55"
3	Salvador Botella (ESP)	Spain	+ 1' 25"
4	Vicente Iturat (ESP)	Peña Solera-Ignis	s.t.
5	Gabriel Mas (ESP)	Mobilete-Caobania	s.t.
6	Wim van Est (NED)	Holland	s.t.
7	Luis Otaño (ESP)	Mobilete-Caobania	s.t.
8	Antonio Ferraz (ESP)	Kas–Boxing	s.t.
9	Michel Stolker (NED)	Holland	s.t.
10	José Urrestarazu (ESP)	Mobilete-Caobania	s.t.

General classification after Stage 7

Rank	Rider	Team	Time
1	Daan de Groot (NED)	Holland	39h 57' 06"
2	Rik Van Looy (BEL)	Belgium	+ 7' 01"
3	Julio San Emeterio (ESP)	Kas–Boxing	+ 7' 07"
4	Fernando Manzaneque (ESP)	Spain	+ 9' 02"
5	Jean Stablinski (FRA)	France	+ 9' 59"
6	Pasquale Fornara (ITA)	Peña Solera-Ignis	+ 10' 41"
7	Hilaire Couvreur (BEL)	Belgium	+ 12' 33"
8	Federico Bahamontes (ESP)	Spain	+ 18' 18"
9	Gabriel Company (ESP)	Spain	+ 19' 44"
10	Rik Luyten (BEL)	Belgium	+ 19' 51"

== Stage 8 ==
7 May 1958 - Cuenca to Toledo, 206 km (128 mi)

Route:

Stage 8 result

Rank	Rider	Team	Time
1	Jean Stablinski (FRA)	France	6h 38' 00"
2	Jan van Gompel (BEL)	Belgium	+ 37"
3	Gabriel Company (ESP)	Spain	+ 1' 15"
4	Antonio Jiménez Quiles (ESP)	Spain	s.t.
5	Benigno Aspuru (ESP)	Kas–Boxing	s.t.
6	Juan Escola (ESP)	Peña Solera-Ignis	+ 3' 38"
7	Gilbert Desmet (BEL)	Belgium	+ 3' 47"
8	René Marigil (ESP)	Lube	+ 3' 59"
9	Emilio Bottecchia (ITA)	Italy	s.t.
10	Juan Campillo (ESP)	Peña Solera-Ignis	s.t.

General classification after Stage 8

Rank	Rider	Team	Time
1	Daan de Groot (NED)	Holland	46h 39' 21"
2	Jean Stablinski (FRA)	France	+ 5' 44"
3	Rik Van Looy (BEL)	Belgium	+ 6' 40"
4	Julio San Emeterio (ESP)	Kas–Boxing	+ 7' 27"
5	Fernando Manzaneque (ESP)	Spain	+ 8' 49"
6	Pasquale Fornara (ITA)	Peña Solera-Ignis	+ 10' 28"
7	Hilaire Couvreur (BEL)	Belgium	+ 12' 20"
8	Gabriel Company (ESP)	Spain	+ 16' 34"
9	Federico Bahamontes (ESP)	Spain	+ 18' 05"
10	Rik Luyten (BEL)	Belgium	+ 20' 11"
