= 1959 Vuelta a España =

Race details
- Dates: 24 April – 10 May
- Stages: 17
- Distance: 3,048 km (1,894 mi)
- Winning time: 84h 36' 20"

Results
| Jersey awarded to the overall winner | Winner | Antonio Suárez (ESP) |
| | Second | José Segú Soriano (ESP) |
| | Third | Rik Van Looy (BEL) |
| Jersey awarded to the points classification winner | Points | Rik Van Looy (BEL) |
| | Mountains | Antonio Suárez (ESP) |
| | Sprints | Vicente Iturat (ESP) |

The 14th Vuelta a España (Tour of Spain), a long-distance bicycle stage race and one of the three grand tours, was held from 24 April to 10 May 1959. It consisted of 17 stages covering a total of 3,048 km (1,894 mi), and was won by Antonio Suárez. Suárez also won the mountains classification while Rik Van Looy won the points classification.

== Route ==
List of stages
| Stage | Date | Course | Distance | Type | Winner |
|---|---|---|---|---|---|
| 1a | 24 April | Madrid to Madrid | 9 km (6 mi) | Team time trial | Saint-Raphaël–R. Geminiani–Dunlop |
| 1b | 24 April | Madrid to Toledo | 114 km (71 mi) | | Rik Van Looy (BEL) |
| 2 | 25 April | Manzanares to Córdoba | 228 km (142 mi) | | Antonio Karmany (ESP) |
| 3 | 26 April | Córdoba to Seville | 140 km (87 mi) | | Vicente Iturat (ESP) |
| 4 | 27 April | Seville to Granada | 240 km (149 mi) | | Federico Bahamontes (ESP) |
| 5 | 28 April | Guadix to Murcia | 225 km (140 mi) | | Antonio Suárez (ESP) |
| 6 | 29 April | Murcia to Alicante | 173 km (107 mi) | | Gabriel Mas (ESP) |
| 7 | 30 April | Alicante to Castellón | 233 km (145 mi) | | Antonio Barrutia (ESP) |
| 8 | 1 May | Castellón to Tortosa | 130 km (81 mi) | | Rik Van Looy (BEL) |
| 9 | 2 May | Tortosa to Barcelona | 196 km (122 mi) | | Rik Van Looy (BEL) |
| 10 | 3 May | Granollers to Lleida | 183 km (114 mi) | | Antonio Suárez (ESP) |
| 11 | 4 May | Lleida to Pamplona | 242 km (150 mi) | | Rik Van Looy (BEL) |
| 12 | 5 May | Pamplona to San Sebastián | 210 km (130 mi) | | José Carlos Sousa Cardoso (POR) |
| 13 | 6 May | San Sebastián to San Sebastián | 9 km (6 mi) | Team time trial | Saint-Raphaël–R. Geminiani–Dunlop |
| 14 | 7 May | Eibar to Vitoria | 62 km (39 mi) | Individual time trial | Roger Rivière (FRA) |
| 15 | 8 May | Vitoria to Santander | 230 km (143 mi) | | Julio San Emeterio (ESP) |
| 16 | 9 May | Santander to Bilbao | 187 km (116 mi) | | Roger Rivière (FRA) |
| 17 | 10 May | Bilbao to Bilbao | 222 km (138 mi) | | Fernando Manzaneque (ESP) |
| | Total | | 3,048 km (1,894 mi) | | |

== Results ==
Final general classification
| Rank | Rider | Team | Time |
|---|---|---|---|
| 1 | (Spain) Antonio Suárez | Licor 43 | 84h 36' 20" |
| 2 | (Spain) José Segú Soriano | Kas | + 1' 06" |
| 3 | (Belgium) Rik Van Looy | Faema–Guerra | + 7' 00" |
| 4 | (France) Pierre Everaert | St.Raphael | + 7' 44" |
| 5 | (France) Emmanuel Busto | Peugeot–Dunlop | + 16' 29" |
| 6 | (France) Roger Rivière | St.Raphael | + 17' 30" |
| 7 | (Belgium) Hilaire Couvreur | Faema–Guerra | + 24' 24" |
| 8 | (Spain) Luis Otaño | Peugeot–Dunlop | + 26' 34" |
| 9 | (Belgium) Joseph Vloeberghs | Faema–Guerra | + 27' 17" |
| 10 | (Spain) Jesús Galdeano | Faema | + 29' 40" |
| 11 | (France) Marcel Rohrbach | Peugeot–Dunlop | |
| 12 | (Spain) René Marigil | Licor 43 | |
| 13 | (Spain) Juan Campillo | Faema | |
| 14 | (Belgium) Frans Van Looveren | Faema–Guerra | |
| 15 | (West Germany) Hans Junkermann | Faema–Guerra | |
| 16 | (Spain) José Luis Talamillo | Boxing | |
| 17 | (Italy) Guido Boni | Tricofilina-Coppi | |
| 18 | (Spain) Jesús Loroño | Faema | |
| 19 | (France) Claude Colette | Peugeot–Dunlop | |
| 20 | (Spain) Julio San Emeterio | Kas | |
| 21 | (Spain) Andrés Trobat | Licor 43 | |
| 22 | (Spain) Antonio Karmany | Kas | |
| 23 | (Spain) Gabriel Company Bauza | Faema | |
| 24 | (Spain) Salvador Botella | Faema | |
| 25 | (Spain) Fernando Manzaneque | Licor 43 | |
