= 1959 Critérium du Dauphiné Libéré =

Race details
- Dates: 1–7 June 1959
- Stages: 7
- Distance: 1,394 km (866 mi)
- Winning time: 35h 58' 07"

Results
	Winner	Henry Anglade (FRA)
	Second	Raymond Mastrotto (FRA)
	Third	Roger Riviere (FRA)

The 1959 Critérium du Dauphiné Libéré was the 13th edition of the Critérium du Dauphiné Libéré cycle race and was held from 1 June to 7 June 1959. The race started and finished in Grenoble. The race was won by Henry Anglade.

== General classification ==
Final general classification

Rank	Rider	Time
1	Henry Anglade (FRA)	35h 58' 07"
2	Raymond Mastrotto (FRA)	+ 17"
3	Roger Rivière (FRA)	+ 6' 57"
4	Jean Dotto (FRA)	+ 8' 05"
5	André Le Dissez (FRA)	+ 8' 34"
6	Marcel Rohrbach (FRA)	+ 8' 58"
7	Louis Rostollan (FRA)	+ 11' 11"
8	Valentin Huot (FRA)	+ 11' 16"
9	José Segú (ESP)	+ 11' 41"
10	Stéphane Lach (FRA)	+ 12' 12"
