= 1959 Volta a Catalunya =

Race details
- Dates: 6–13 September 1959
- Stages: 8
- Distance: 1,306.6 km (811.9 mi)
- Winning time: 36h 54' 53"

Results
	Winner	Salvador Botella (ESP)
	Second	Fernando Manzaneque (ESP)
	Third	José Herrero Berrendero (ESP)

The 1959 Volta a Catalunya was the 39th edition of the Volta a Catalunya cycle race and was held from 6 September to 13 September 1959. The race started in Montjuïc and finished in Barcelona. The race was won by Salvador Botella.

== General classification ==
Final general classification

Rank	Rider	Time
1	Salvador Botella (ESP)	36h 54' 53"
2	Fernando Manzaneque (ESP)	+ 3"
3	José Herrero Berrendero (ESP)	+ 19"
4	Miguel Pacheco (ESP)	+ 1' 00"
5	Antonio Karmany (ESP)	+ 1' 16"
6	Antonio Suárez (ESP)	+ 1' 50"
7	Claude Colette (FRA)	+ 2' 01"
8	José Gómez del Moral (ESP)	+ 2' 20"
9	Luis Otaño (ESP)	+ 3' 44"
10	Jaime Alomar (ESP)	+ 3' 49"
