= 1957 Critérium du Dauphiné Libéré =

Race details
- Dates: 8–16 June 1957
- Stages: 9
- Distance: 1,769 km (1,099 mi)
- Winning time: 49h 05' 20"

Results
	Winner	Marcel Rohrbach (FRA)
	Second	René Privat (FRA)
	Third	Jean-Pierre Schmitz (LUX)

The 1957 Critérium du Dauphiné Libéré was the 11th edition of the Critérium du Dauphiné Libéré cycle race and was held from 8 June to 16 June 1957. The race started in Saint-Étienne and finished in Grenoble. The race was won by Marcel Rohrbach.

== General classification ==
Final general classification

Rank	Rider	Time
1	Marcel Rohrbach (FRA)	49h 05' 20"
2	René Privat (FRA)	+ 1' 40"
3	Jean-Pierre Schmitz (LUX)	+ 3' 08"
4	Jean Dotto (FRA)	+ 6' 35"
5	Michel Van Aerde (BEL)	+ 7' 15"
6	Louis Rostollan (FRA)	+ 9' 36"
7	Piet de Jongh (NED)	+ 13' 43"
8	Piet van Est (NED)	+ 16' 32"
9	Pierre Gouget (FRA)	+ 16' 58"
10	Joseph Thomin (FRA)	+ 17' 35"
