= Santo Domingo-Caudilla =

Coordinates: 40.012°N 4.326°W

- municipality
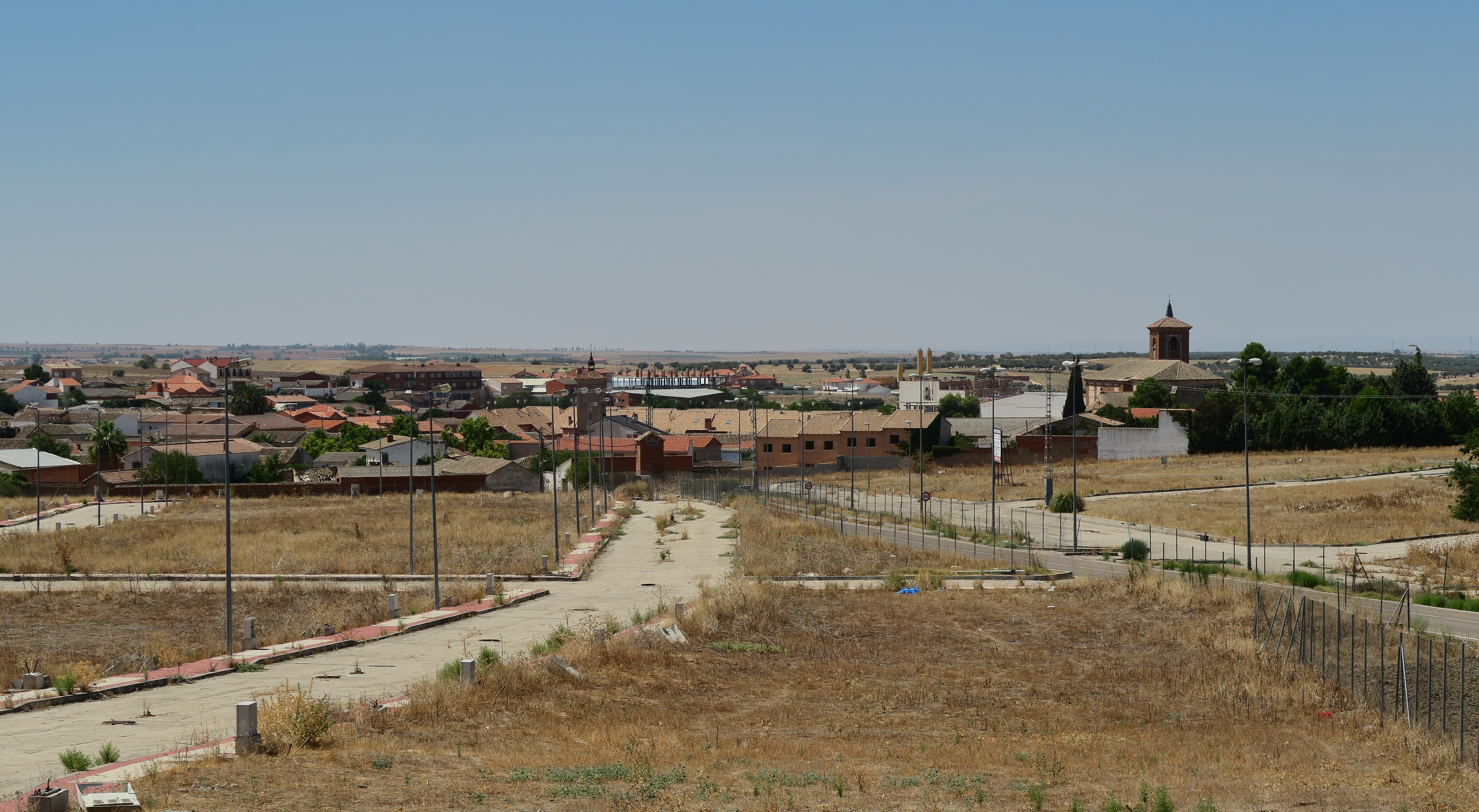

- Flag Coat of arms
- Interactive map of Santo Domingo-Caudilla
- Country: Spain
- Autonomous community: Castile-La Mancha
- Province: Toledo

Area
  - Total: 54 km^{2} (21 sq mi)
- Elevation: 569 m (1,867 ft)

Population (2025-01-01)
  - Total: 1,299
  - Density: 24/km^{2} (62/sq mi)
- Time zone: UTC+1 (CET)
  - Summer (DST): UTC+2 (CEST)

Santo Domingo-Caudilla is a municipality located in the province of Toledo, Castile-La Mancha, Spain. According to the 2006 census (INE), The municipality has a population of 801 inhabitants.

== Notable people ==
- Federico Bahamontes (1928–2023), professional road racing cyclist and Tour de France winner.
