= 1948 Gent–Wevelgem =

Race details
- Dates: 9 May 1948
- Stages: 1
- Distance: 276 km (171 mi)
- Winning time: 7h 31' 00"

Results
	Winner	Valère Ollivier (BEL)
	Second	Albert Ramon (BEL)
	Third	Hilaire Couvreur (BEL)

The 1948 Gent–Wevelgem was the tenth edition of the Belgian Gent–Wevelgem cycle race and was held on 9 May 1948. The race started in Ghent and finished in Wevelgem. The race was won by Valère Ollivier.

== General classification ==
Final general classification

Rank	Rider	Time
1	Valère Ollivier (BEL)	7h 31' 00"
2	Albert Ramon (BEL)	+ 0"
3	Hilaire Couvreur (BEL)	+ 18"
4	Raymond Impanis (BEL)	+ 26"
5	Gérard Buyl (BEL)	+ 4' 35"
6	Emmanuel Thoma (BEL)	+ 4' 50"
7	Jean Bogaerts (BEL)	+ 4' 50"
8	Achiel Buysse (BEL)	+ 4' 50"
9	Constant Lauwers (BEL)	+ 4' 50"
10	Jean-Baptiste Verpoorten (BEL)	+ 4' 50"
