= 1958 Vuelta a España =

Race details
- Dates: 30 April – 15 May
- Stages: 16
- Distance: 3,241.8 km (2,014 mi)
- Winning time: 94h 54' 21"

Results
| Jersey awarded to the overall winner | Winner | Jean Stablinski (FRA) |
| | Second | Pasquale Fornara (ITA) |
| | Third | Fernando Manzaneque (ESP) |
| Jersey awarded to the points classification winner | Points | Salvador Botella (ESP) |
| | Mountains | Federico Bahamontes (ESP) |
| | Sprints | Vicente Iturat (ESP) |

The 13th Vuelta a España (Tour of Spain), a long-distance bicycle stage race and one of the three grand tours, was held from 30 April to 15 May 1958. It consisted of 16 stages covering a total of 3,241.8 km (2,014.4 mi), and was won by Jean Stablinski. Salvador Botella won the points classification and Federico Bahamontes won the mountains classification.

== Route ==
List of stages
| Stage | Date | Course | Distance | Type | Winner |
|---|---|---|---|---|---|
| 1 | 30 April | Bilbao to San Sebastián | 164 km (102 mi) | | Miguel Pacheco (ESP) |
| 2 | 1 May | San Sebastián to Pamplona | 150 km (93 mi) | | Antonio Jiménez Quiles (ESP) |
| 3 | 2 May | Pamplona to Zaragoza | 245 km (152 mi) | | Pierino Baffi (ITA) |
| 4 | 3 May | Zaragoza to Barcelona | 229 km (142 mi) | | Rik Van Looy (BEL) |
| 5a | 4 May | Barcelona to Barcelona | 4 km (2 mi) | Team time trial | France |
| 5b | 4 May | Barcelona to Tarragona | 119 km (74 mi) | | Rik Van Looy (BEL) |
| 6 | 5 May | Tarragona to Valencia | 263 km (163 mi) | | Rik Van Looy (BEL) |
| 7 | 6 May | Valencia to Cuenca | 216 km (134 mi) | | Gilbert Desmet (BEL) |
| 8 | 7 May | Cuenca to Toledo | 206 km (128 mi) | | Jean Stablinski (FRA) |
| 9 | 8 May | Toledo to Madrid | 241 km (150 mi) | | Rik Van Looy (BEL) |
| 10 | 9 May | Madrid to Soria | 225 km (140 mi) | | Rik Van Looy (BEL) |
| 11 | 10 May | Soria to Vitoria | 167 km (104 mi) | | René Marigil (ESP) |
| 12 | 11 May | Vitoria to Bilbao | 169 km (105 mi) | | Fausto Iza (ESP) |
| 13a | 12 May | Bilbao to Castro Urdiales | 35 km (22 mi) | Individual time trial | Guido Carlesi (ITA); Jesús Loroño (ESP) |
| 13b | 12 May | Castro Urdiales to Santander | 105 km (65 mi) | | Jean Graczyk (FRA) |
| 14 | 13 May | Santander to Gijón | 221 km (137 mi) | | Pierino Baffi (ITA) |
| 15 | 14 May | Oviedo to Palencia | 246 km (153 mi) | | Rik Luyten (BEL) |
| 16 | 15 May | Palencia to Madrid | 241 km (150 mi) | | Rik Luyten (BEL) |
| | Total | | 3,241.8 km (2,014 mi) | | |

== Results ==
Final general classification
| Rank | Rider | Team | Time |
|---|---|---|---|
| 1 | (France) Jean Stablinski | | 94h 54' 21" |
| 2 | (Italy) Pasquale Fornara | Pena Solera-Ignis | + 2' 51" |
| 3 | (Spain) Fernando Manzaneque | | + 3' 01" |
| 4 | (Belgium) Hilaire Couvreur | | + 5' 04" |
| 5 | (Spain) Luis Otaño | Mobilete-Caobania | + 10' 36" |
| 6 | (Spain) Federico Bahamontes | | + 11' 39" |
| 7 | (Spain) Julio San Emeterio | Kas-Boxing | + 13' 16" |
| 8 | (Spain) Jesús Loroño | | + 16' 09" |
| 9 | (Belgium) Rik Luyten | | + 28' 13" |
| 10 | (Spain) Benigno Aspuru | Kas-Boxing | + 33' 37" |
| 11 | (France) François Mahé | | |
| 12 | (Belgium) Gilbert Desmet | | |
| 13 | (Spain) Juan Campillo | Pena Solera-Ignis | |
| 14 | (Spain) Salvador Botella | | |
| 15 | (Spain) Antonio Ferraz | Kas-Boxing | |
| 16 | (Portugal) Antonio Barbosa | | |
| 17 | (Spain) Vicente Iturat | Pena Solera-Ignis | |
| 18 | (Spain) Gabriel Mas Arbona | Mobilete-Caobania | |
| 19 | (Spain) René Marigil | | |
| 20 | (Spain) Miguel Pacheco Font | | |
| 21 | (France) Raymond Hoorelbeke | | |
| 22 | (Belgium) Jan Van Gompel | | |
| 23 | (Netherlands) Wim Van Est | Locomotief | |
| 24 | (Spain) Gabriel Company Bauza | | |
| 25 | (Spain) Antonio Jimenez | | |
