= 1958 Critérium du Dauphiné Libéré =

Race details
- Dates: 2–8 June 1958
- Stages: 7
- Distance: 1,368 km (850 mi)
- Winning time: 37h 34' 14"

Results
	Winner	Louis Rostollan (FRA)
	Second	Francis Pipelin (FRA)
	Third	Jean-Pierre Schmitz (LUX)

The 1958 Critérium du Dauphiné Libéré was the 12th edition of the Critérium du Dauphiné Libéré cycle race and was held from 2 June to 8 June 1958. The race started and finished in Grenoble. The race was won by Louis Rostollan.

== General classification ==
Final general classification

Rank	Rider	Time
1	Louis Rostollan (FRA)	37h 34' 14"
2	Francis Pipelin (FRA)	+ 4"
3	Jean-Pierre Schmitz (LUX)	+ 6' 23"
4	Pietro Polo (ITA)	+ 6' 58"
5	Manuel Busto (FRA)	+ 7' 48"
6	Eddy Pauwels (BEL)	+ 9' 32"
7	Jean Graczyk (FRA)	+ 10' 17"
8	Siro Bianchi (FRA)	+ 12' 46"
9	Alex Close (BEL)	+ 12' 49"
10	Raymond Meysenq (FRA)	+ 13' 45"
