= Statue of Federico Martín Bahamontes =

Sculpture in Toledo, Spain

Federico Martín Bahamontes
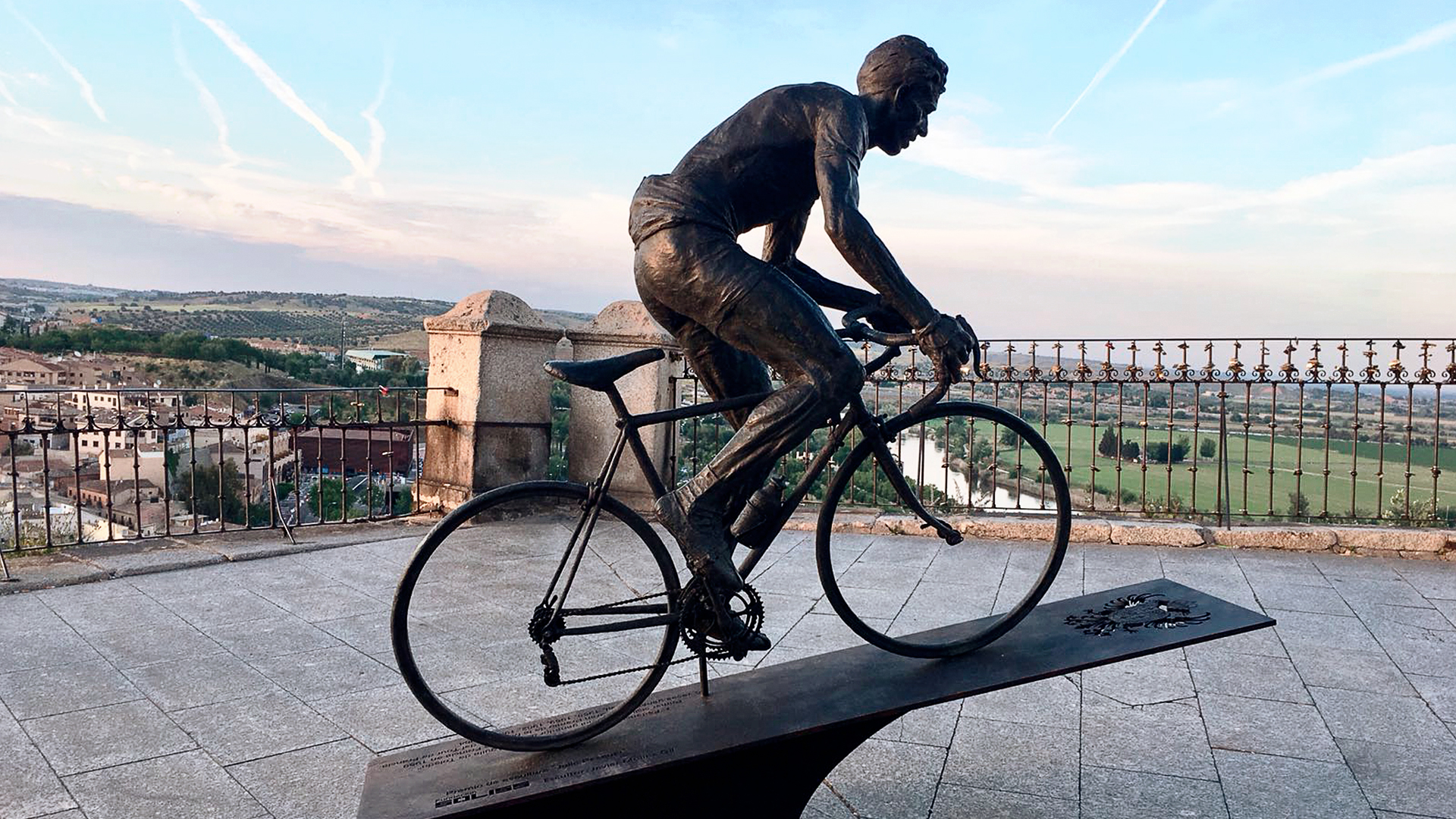
- Location: Paseo del Miradero, Toledo, Spain
- Coordinates: 39.861372222222°N 4.0218527777778°W
- Designer: Javier Molina Gil
- Material: Bronze
- Opening date: 6 May 2018
- Dedicated to: Federico Martín Bahamontes

The Statue of Federico Martín Bahamontes is an instance of public art located in Toledo, Spain. It consists of a bronze statue representing Federico Martín Bahamontes, winner of the 1959 Tour de France and adoptive son of the city of Toledo.

== History and description ==
Promoted and funded by the Fundación Soliss, the statue is a work by the Valencian sculptor Javier Molina Gil. It represents Federico Martín Bahamontes, the Eagle of Toledo, a celebrated cyclist and Adoptive Son of the City of Toledo. The bronze base on which the statue stands incorporates a die-cut coat of arms of the city, featuring the characteristic double-headed eagle.

Cast in bronze, it attempts to depict a peak Bahamontes, while riding the 1959 Tour de France. The statue is slightly bigger in height than real-life Federico Martín Bahamontes (1.90 vs 1.77 m). Bahamontes reportedly collaborated with the author in the design of the statue, letting the sculptor to obtain accurate biometric data.

Installed in the Paseo del Miradero, in the centre of the city, it was unveiled on 6 May 2018, during a ceremony attended by Bahamontes himself (aged 89 at the time of the inauguration) as well as by Miguel Indurain, Pedro Delgado and Carlos Sastre. Mayor Milagros Tolón had reportedly let Bahamontes choose the location for his statue.

After a vandal attack, the statue appeared toppled from its base on 28 July 2019, with one broken wheel and other damaged pieces. It was temporarily removed from the public space. It was reinstated to its original location, with reinforcements, in September 2019.
