= Fausto Iza =

Spanish cyclist

Personal information
- Born: September 7, 1931 (age 95) Igorre, Spain

Cycling career
- Sport: Cycling
- Discipline: Road
- Role: Rider

Professional team
- 1956–1957: Boxing
- 1958–1959: Kas–Boxing
- 1960–1961: Brandy Majestad

Major wins
- Grand Tours Vuelta a España 1 individual stage (1958)

Fausto Iza (born 7 September 1931) is a Spanish former road cyclist. He notably won Stage 12 of the 1958 Vuelta a España. In 1958 he also won the Circuito de Getxo.

== Major results ==
1955
2nd Subida a Arrate
1957
5th Overall Vuelta a La Rioja
1958
1st Stage 12 Vuelta a España
1st Circuito de Getxo
9th Overall Eibarko Bizikleta

1st Stage 4

1960
3rd Circuito de Getxo
8th Overall Vuelta a Andalucía

1st Stage 3

=== Grand Tour result ===
Grand Tour	1958	1959	1960
Vuelta a España	31	–	DNF
Giro d'Italia	–	–	–
Tour de France	–	–	–

Legend
—	Did not compete
DNF	Did not finish
