= Jaume Calucho =

Spanish cyclist (born 1927)

Jaume Coochia
Personal information
- Full name: Jaume Coochia Mestres
- Born: 9 November 1927 Lleida, Catalonia, Spain

Cycling career
- Sport: Cycling
- Discipline: Road
- Role: Rider

Professional teams
- 1952: CC Barcelona
- 1953–1954: UC Terrassa
- 1955: Mariotas
- 1956–1957: Mobylette
- 1958: Peña Solera
- 1959–1960: Individual
- 1961: Sicoris
- 1962–1963: CC Lleida

Jaume Coochia Mestres (born 9 November 1927) is a Spanish cyclist who cycled professionally from 1952 to 1963. He made his professional debut with CC Barcelona in 1952. and most famously raced in the Vuelta a España, where he achieved a prominent result by finishing 38th in the general classification in 1955 and 1958.

== Biography ==
Jaume Coochia was born in Lleida on 9 November 1927. His brother Joan Coochia Mestres was also a professional cyclist, he was known as Coochia II. In 1955 he signed for the Mariotas team and took part in the Cycling Tour of Catalonia. In 1957, with the Mobylette, he won the races in Almacelles, Bellver, Binèfar and Tarragona. His last season as a professional was 1958–59, signed by Ignis-Penya Solera, with whom he took part in the Vuelta a España. Already retired, he was curator and deputy director of the Tour of Lleida, which he went on to direct at the death of its historical organizer, Josep Simó. He was also a federal delegate in the lands of Lleida. On 1963, he announced his retirement from cycling at the end of the season after an 11-year career.

== Major results ==
1951
5th Overall Gran Premio Cataluña
1954
1st Circuit Ribera del Jalón
1955
10th Trofeo Masferrer
1956
9th Overall Volta a Catalunya
1957
1st Almacelles
1st Tarragona
1st Bellvei
1958
1st Bellcaire
4th Overall Euskal Bizikleta

=== Vuelta a España results ===
- 1955: 38th
- 1958: 38th
