= Fernando Brandolini =

Italian cyclist

Personal information
- Born: 4 January 1932 Mediglia, Italy
- Died: 27 July 1987 (aged 55)

Cycling career
- Sport: Cycling
- Role: Rider

Fernando Brandolini (4 January 1932 – 27 July 1987) was an Italian professional racing cyclist. He rode in the 1960 Tour de France.
