= Jesús Davoz =

Spanish road racing cyclist (1931–2021)

Personal information
- Full name: Jesús Davoz Gorrotxategi
- Born: December 19, 1931 Errenteria, Gipuzkoa, Spain
- Died: May 20, 2021 (aged 89) Lezo, Gipuzkoa, Spain

Cycling career
- Sport: Cycling
- Discipline: Road
- Role: Rider

Professional teams
- 1956: Boxing Club
- 1957: Real Unión Irun
- 1958: Mobylette–GAC
- 1959: Boxing Club
- 1960: Kas / Catigene / Brandy Majestad
- 1961–1962: Funcor–Munguia

Major wins
- One professional stage win

Jesús Davoz Gorrotxategi (19 December 1931 – 20 May 2021) was a Spanish professional road racing cyclist active in the late 1950s and early 1960s. He competed for several Spanish professional teams and rode the Vuelta a España; his most notable victory was a stage win in the 1958 Vuelta a Andalucía.

== Career ==
Born in Errenteria, Gipuzkoa, Davoz turned professional in the mid-1950s and rode for teams including Boxing Club, Real Unión Irun, Mobylette–GAC and Funcor–Munguia. He raced mainly on the Spanish professional circuit between 1956 and 1962.

At the 1958 Vuelta a Andalucía (Ruta del Sol) Davoz won Stage 6 (Huelva – Jerez de la Frontera), a 191 km stage held on 7 February 1958. In the same season he rode the 1958 Vuelta a España, finishing the race and recording several top-30 stage placings.

Davoz continued to compete through the early 1960s, with additional notable results including top placings in Spanish one-day races and stage events. His recorded professional career ends in the 1962 season with Funcor–Munguia.

== Major results ==
1958

- Vuelta a Andalucía — Stage 6 winner.

1958

- 27th Overall, Vuelta a España.

(Complete palmarès available at ProCyclingStats and CyclingRanking.)

== Death ==
Jesús Davoz died in Lezo, Gipuzkoa, on 20 May 2021 at the age of 89.
