= José Segú =

Spanish cyclist (1935–2010)

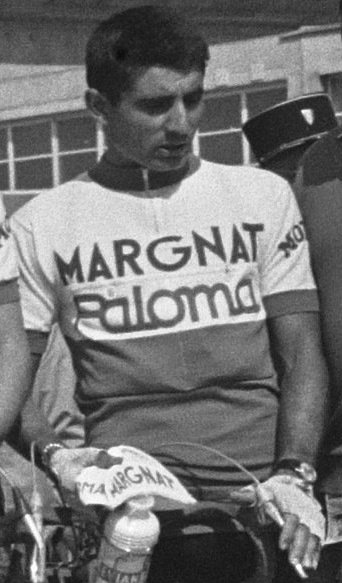
- José Segú in 1964

Personal information
- Full name: José Segú Soriano
- Born: 19 March 1935 La Garriga, Spain
- Died: 25 July 2010 (aged 75) La Garriga, Spain

Cycling career
- Sport: Cycling
- Discipline: Road
- Role: Rider

Professional teams
- 1954: RCD Espanyol–Mobylette–GAC & Splendid–d'Alessandro
- 1955: Peña Solera–Cacaolat & Splendid–d'Alessandro
- 1956: RCD Espanyol–Mobylette
- 1957: Faema–Guerra
- 1958: Peña Solera & Ignis–Doniselli
- 1959–1960: Liberia–Hutchinson
- 1959–1962: Kas–Boxing
- 1963: Flandria–Faema & Licor 43
- 1964: Ignis & Margnat–Paloma–Dunlop
- 1965: Tedi Montjuich
- 1966: Libertas

Major wins
- Grand Tours Vuelta a España 2 individual stages (1962, 1963)

José Segú Soriano (19 March 1935 – 25 July 2010) was a Spanish professional cyclist. He finished second in the 1959 Vuelta a España, and won the Vuelta a Andalucía in 1965.

== Major results ==
1953
1st Trofeo Jaumendreu
1954
9th Trofeo Masferrer
1955
3rd Overall Volta a la Comunitat Valenciana

1st Stage 5

3rd Overall Vuelta a Levante

1st Stage 5

1958
1st Stage 5 Volta a Catalunya
1959
1st Stage 2 Volta a Catalunya
2nd Overall Vuelta a España
9th Overall Critérium du Dauphiné Libéré

1st Stage 1

9th Overall GP du Midi Libre
9th Trofeo Masferrer
1960
1st GP Ayutamiento de Bilbao
1st Stage 8b Volta a Catalunya
2nd Circuito de Getxo
3rd GP Llodio
1961
3rd Prueba Villafranca de Ordizia
9th Overall Volta a Catalunya

1st Stage 7b

9th Subida a Arrate
1962
1st GP Pascuas
1st Stage 17 Vuelta a España
Vuelta a Andalucía

1st Stages 1, 5, 6 & 8

1963
1st Stage 2 Vuelta a España
1st Stage 3 Vuelta a La Rioja
1st Stage 2 Grand Prix du Midi Libre
1964
4th Trofeo Masferrer
4th Overall Vuelta a Andalucía
5th Mont Faron
1965
1st Overall Vuelta a Andalucía

1st Stage 3

1st Overall Vuelta a Guatemala

1st Stage 1
