= Guido Boni (cyclist) =

Italian cyclist

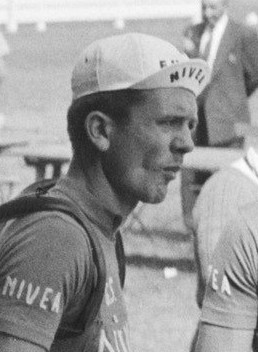
- Guido Boni (1956)

Personal information
- Born: 4 November 1933
- Died: 28 June 2014 (aged 80)

Cycling career
- Sport: Cycling
- Role: Rider

Guido Boni (4 November 1933 – 28 June 2014) was an Italian racing cyclist. He won stage 7 of the 1958 Giro d'Italia.
