= Licor 43 (cycling team) =

Team information
- Registered: Spain
- Founded: 1958
- Disbanded: 1964
- Discipline: Road

Team name history
- 1958–1964: Licor 43

Licor 43 was a Spanish professional cycling team that existed from 1958 to 1964. It was sponsored by the Spanish liqueur brand Licor 43. Antonio Suárez won the general classification of the 1959 Vuelta a España with the team.
