= Manuel Busto =

French cyclist

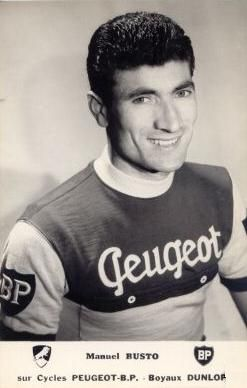

Personal information
- Born: 1 October 1932 Cransac, France
- Died: 9 October 2017 (aged 85) Saint-Rémy-de-Provence

Cycling career
- Sport: Cycling
- Role: Rider

Manuel Busto (1 October 1932 – 9 October 2017) was a French professional racing cyclist. He rode in six editions of the Tour de France.
