= Pierre Everaert =

French cyclist (1933–1989)

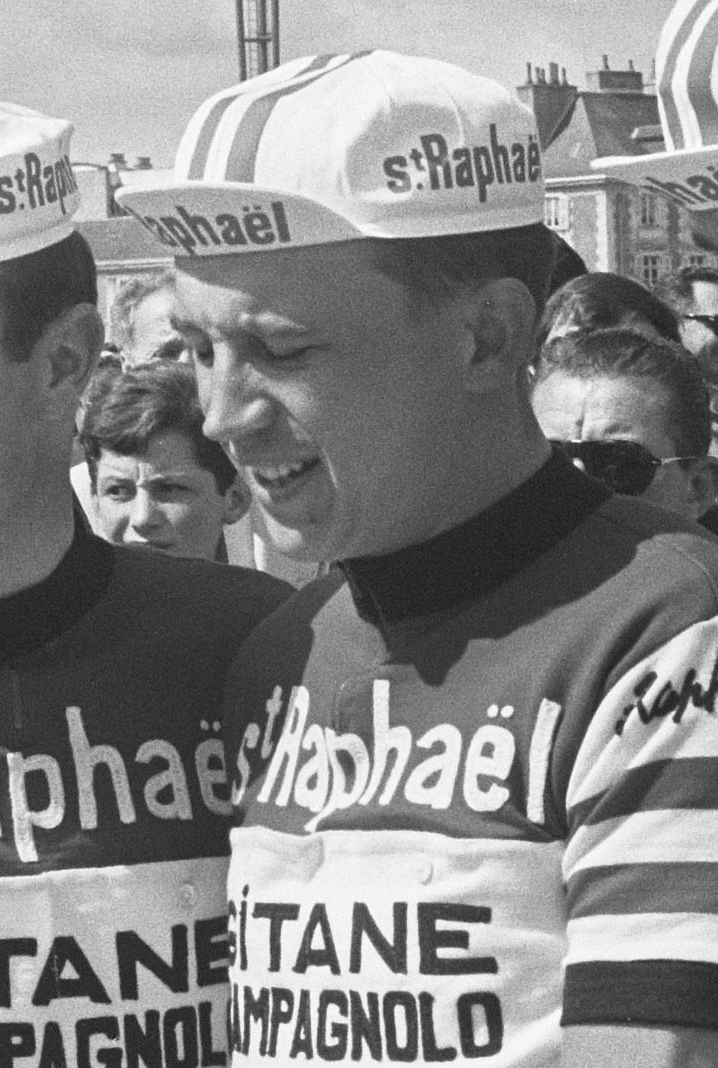
- Pierre Everaert in 1964

Personal information
- Born: 21 December 1933 Quaëdypre, France
- Died: 26 May 1989 (aged 55) Lille, France

Cycling career
- Sport: Cycling
- Role: Rider

Pierre Everaert (21 December 1933 – 26 May 1989) was a French professional racing cyclist between the years 1955 and 1966. He rode in eight editions of the Tour de France, with a highest general classification of 32nd and a best stage finish of second, both in the 1960 edition.
