= Rik Luyten =

Belgian cyclist

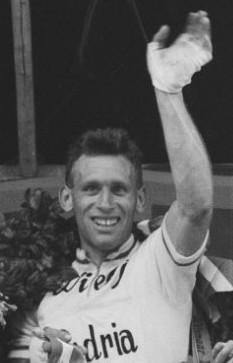

Personal information
- Born: 11 July 1931
- Died: 7 April 1969 (aged 37)

Cycling career
- Sport: Cycling
- Role: Rider

Rik Luyten (11 July 1931 – 7 April 1969) was a Belgian racing cyclist. He rode in the 1958 Tour de France.
