= Federico Bahamontes =

Spanish cyclist (1928–2023)

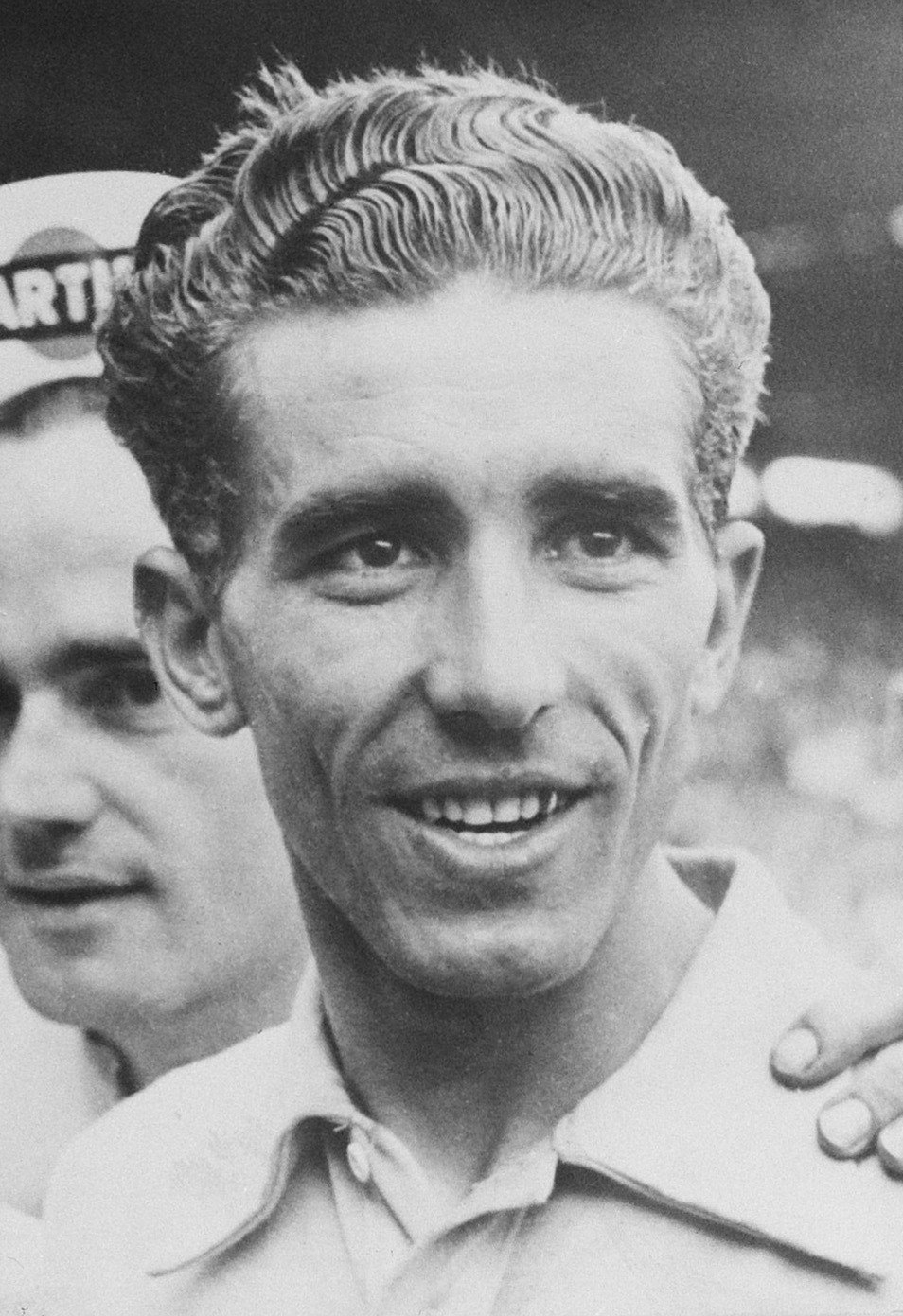
- Bahamontes in 1962

Personal information
- Full name: Alejandro Martín Bahamontes
- Nickname: El Águila de Toledo (The Eagle of Toledo)
- Born: 9 July 1928 Santo Domingo-Caudilla, Spain
- Died: 8 August 2023 (aged 95) Valladolid, Spain

Cycling career
- Sport: Cycling
- Discipline: Road
- Role: Retired
- Rider type: Climbing specialist

Professional teams
- 1953–1954: Splendid
- 1955: Terrot–Hutchinson
- 1956: Girardengo–ICEP
- 1957: Mobylette
- 1958: Faema–Guerra
- 1959: Tricofilina–Coppi/Kas–Boxing
- 1960: Faema
- 1961: VOV
- 1962–1965: Margnat–Paloma–D'Alessandro

Major wins
- Grand Tours Tour de France General classification (1959) Mountains classification (1954, 1958, 1959, 1962, 1963, 1964) 7 individual stages (1958, 1959, 1962, 1963, 1964) Giro d'Italia Mountains classification (1956) 1 individual stage (1958) Vuelta a España Mountains classification (1957, 1958) 3 individual stages (1957, 1958, 1960)

Federico Martín Bahamontes, born Alejandro Martín Bahamontes (Spanish: [feðeˈɾiko maɾˈtim ba(a)ˈmontes]; 9 July 1928 – 8 August 2023), was a Spanish professional road racing cyclist. He won the 1959 Tour de France and a total of 11 Grand Tour stages between 1954 and 1965. He won a total of nine mountain classifications and was the first cyclist to complete a "career triple" by winning the mountain classification in all three Grand Tours. Following his retirement, Bahamontes ran a bicycle and motorcycle shop and was named the best climber in the history of the Tour de France by a panel organised by L'Équipe in 2013.

== Early life ==
Federico Bahamontes was born on 9 July 1928 in Santo Domingo-Caudilla, Toledo, to Julián Martín and Victoria Bahamontes. Unlike the usual custom of calling a Spaniard by the first of two surnames, Bahamontes is known by his second; there were too many with the surname Martín in his village so he took up his mother's surname. He was named after his uncle, Federico, who was the head of the family and proclaimed that Bahamontes would be called after him at the baptism in the local church. Between 1929 and 1931, his parents had three more children, all girls. Bahamontes attended a school in Toledo run by nuns, which he did not enjoy. In 1936, the Spanish Civil War broke out, but Bahamontes' father, a veteran of the Cuban War of Independence, did not fight because he was too old. Along with other civilians in Toledo, however, he was enlisted by Nationalist forces to act as reinforcements as Republican forces closed in on Toledo. He managed to escape this service, but when he returned home, he found soldiers who "called themselves Communists" and ordered him to open the storehouses on the estate where the family lived. He refused, before running away, and eventually escaping the ensuing manhunt by hiding in a doorway.

The family eventually fled to Madrid in July 1936. When the family arrived, the city was held by Republican forces who had withstood an attempted invasion from the Nationalists. In October, however, Nationalist forces decided to lay siege to the city and Julián was enlisted into the Republican reserve forces and led a mule team that transported supplies. Meanwhile, Bahamontes, along with his mother and sisters, escaped to the village of Villarrubia de Santiago due to the intensifying air raids in Madrid. They were joined by Julián after the war, but the family continued to struggle; as he had been with the Republicans, the losing side, Bahamontes' father received no pension and he was forced to break rocks for road construction in order to earn enough money for the family. The young Bahamontes resorted to theft in order to sustain himself and the family; he would jump into the trailers of lorries from a bridge over a road before filling a bag with food from the trailer. He also dug out live ammunition from civil war trenches to sell as scrap metal.

In 1946, at the age of 18, Bahamontes bought his first bike for 150 pesetas (roughly equivalent to £250 or US$342.47 in 2014) in order to transport food illegally between villages. As rationing was in place due to economic ruin, the black market for food flourished. It was during this activity that Bahamontes contracted an unknown disease which he believed to be typhoid. Whilst hiding from the Civil Guard, who had orders to arrest anyone black marketeering, he stood in stagnant water and was bitten by a mosquito (even though typhoid is not spread via mosquitoes). This led to extreme weight loss, loss of hair and fever. After being restricted to his house for two months, Bahamontes returned to black marketeering, and competed in his first cycling race after two other black marketeers invited him. On 18 July 1947, he cycled to a nearby village where the race began and, with only a banana and lemon as sustenance, he managed to finish second.

== Career ==
Following victory at his second race, Bahamontes began racing as a full-time amateur; the prize money from such races was significantly more than the wages of what little work there was. He soon formed a friendship and partnership with another cyclist, Ladislau Soria, who was strong on the flat. Together, they dominated the local races with Soria's brother acting as a manager. In his early years as an amateur, Bahamontes won the Tour of Andalusia and Tour of Cadiz; however, he was called up to 18 months of National service in July 1949. It was during this time that he opened up a shop in Toledo renting out bikes.

Bahamontes first faced professionals at the 1953 Vuelta a Asturias. The field included some of the strongest cyclists in Spain and teams from Italy and Belgium. Racing as an independent semi-professional, he won the opening stage and eventually finished twenty-first out of sixty-nine. He competed in more races in Madrid and elsewhere in Spain before moving to Barcelona, the wealthiest city in Spain. It was here that he received backing from Santiago Mostajo Trigo, a former cyclist and businessman who was a "hugely influential figure" in Spanish cycling.

Due to financial reasons, the Vuelta a España did not run between 1951 and 1954, so the Volta a Catalunya was the biggest race in Spain. It was there, in 1953, that Bahamontes won the King of the Mountains. The race received coverage in Mundo Deportivo, a Catalan sports newspaper, as well as having the support of fourteen sponsors. Teams from across Europe competed, with Bahamontes racing for a team directed by Mostajo and sponsored by Balanzas Berkel, a manufacturer of weighing equipment. He performed above expectations, managing a 146 kilometres (91 mi) solo breakaway on stage 8 to secure his mountain classification jersey.

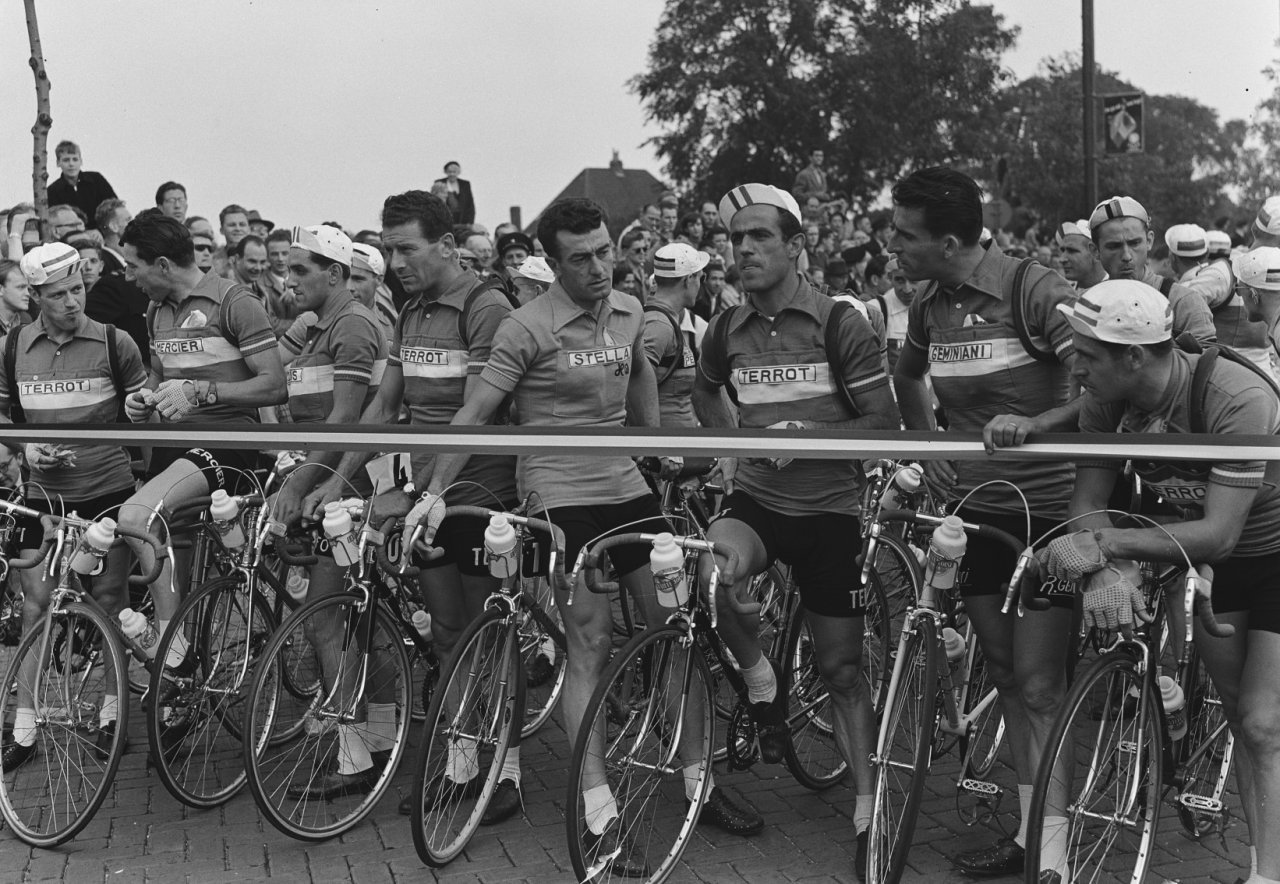
Riders at the start of stage one of the 1954 Tour de France

The director of the Spanish team, Julián Berrendero, picked Bahamontes for the 1954 Tour de France in the summer of 1953, with instructions to "try to win it". He initially declined, stating that he did not know French and "had no suitcase", but later accepted the offer with a few weeks to go after discussing with his parents. The Spanish team included 1948 Vuelta a España winner Bernardo Ruiz, former national champion Francisco Masip, and 1953 Volta a Catalunya winner Salvador Botella. The first half of the race was relaxed for Bahamontes, until stage eleven where he broke away from the peloton and went over the Col d'Aubisque in first place. It was on the fog-covered descent, however, that he crashed, eventually finishing thirty-second. Bahamontes continued to score well in the mountain classifications; he was first over the Col du Tourmalet and Col de Peyresourde. It was the Col du Galibier, however, that was the most important; Bahamontes rode down Jean Dotto to finish the climb in first place, thus winning a 100,000 franc (roughly $250 in 2021) prize as well as mountain points which secured him the mountain classification victory. He finished 25th in the General classification.

The next year, Bahamontes competed at the 1955 Vuelta a España. He gained the nickname el Gitano (the gypsy) when he started to sell bike parts to other riders he had bought from factories in France. The race did not go well for Bahamontes; during stage five, he got a "twisted tendon" in his left knee and had a limp when off the bike. The injury was so serious that a protrusion could be felt on his knee several decades later. As a result, Bahamontes would not achieve another Tour de France mountain classification victory until 1958. After receiving treatment for his injury which reduced the pain and inflammation, Bahamontes continued to race. He won the 1955 Vuelta a Asturias, Vuelta a los Puertos and a hill climb on Mont Faron. Despite the success, a medical examination before the Tour de France prevented him from competing and he was replaced by national champion Antonio Gelabert.

He won the Tour de France in 1959, and won the Tour's Mountains classification (also called the "King of the Mountains") six times (1954, 1958, 1959, 1962, 1963, 1964). He also took second and third places overall in 1963 and 1964 respectively. In total, he won seven Tour stages. He was also second in the 1957 Vuelta a España, and won the mountains competition then and the following year, 1958, when he finished 6th. He also won the mountains competition in the Giro d'Italia in 1956.

In the 1959 Tour de France, Bahamontes benefited from an early escape on a stage in the Pyrenees, and then won a mountain time trial to the Puy-de-Dôme. Into the Alps, he combined with fellow climber Charly Gaul to extend the lead into Grenoble, and although French riders Henry Anglade and Jacques Anquetil cut their deficits, neither made up enough time to threaten Bahamontes' overall lead. He won by just over four minutes from Anglade, and became King of the Mountains too.

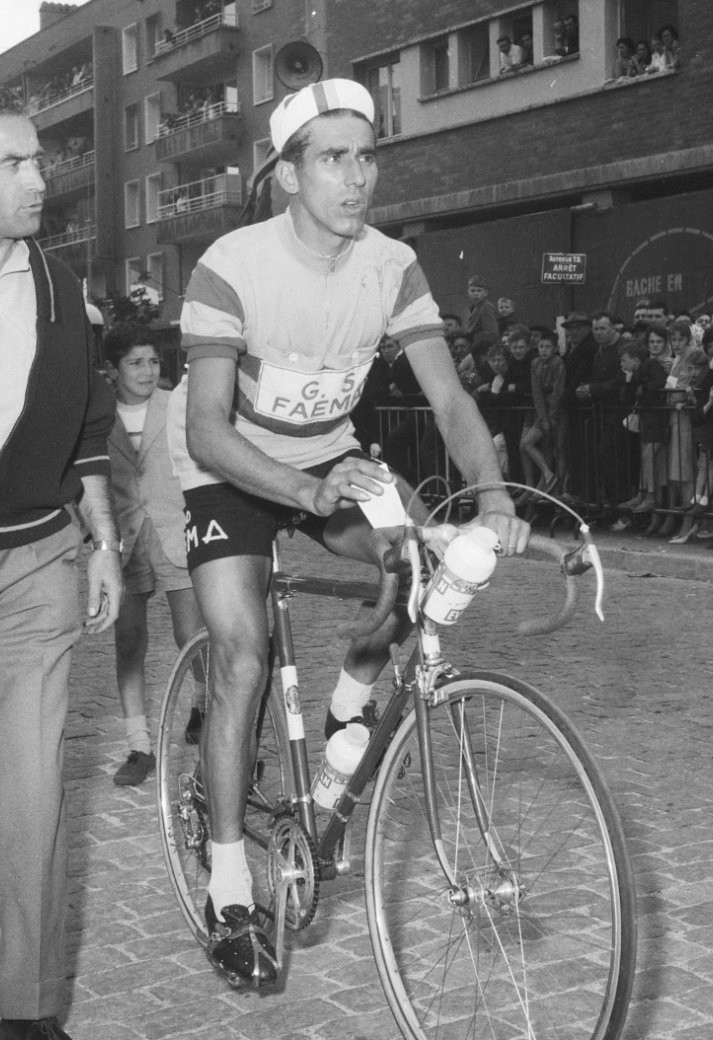
Bahamontes in 1960

In 1960, Bahamontes got no further than the first few days of the Tour, after falling ill. In the 1963 Tour de France, Anquetil beat Bahamontes into second place. Bahamontes and Anquetil performed well in the Alps and after stage 16 were only three seconds apart in first and second place respectively. Anquetil was able to stay with Bahamontes, the superior climber, over the steep climb of the Col de la Forclaz on the following stage, won by Bahamontes. This allowed Anquetil to use his advantage in the time trial to overcome his deficit and claim a fourth Tour victory, while Bahamontes finished second. A year later, in the 1964 Tour de France, Anquetil took his fifth victory and the margin over Bahamontes in third was 4:44; Raymond Poulidor took second place. Bahamontes had his sixth King of the Mountains win and two more stage wins (bringing his total Tour de France stage wins to seven). His final Tour de France came in 1965, where he abandoned on stage 10, having finished the previous day's stage second to last, 40 minutes down. On his final stage, he made one last attack on the Col de Portet d'Aspet, in his own words "to show them [the audience] what they would be missing".

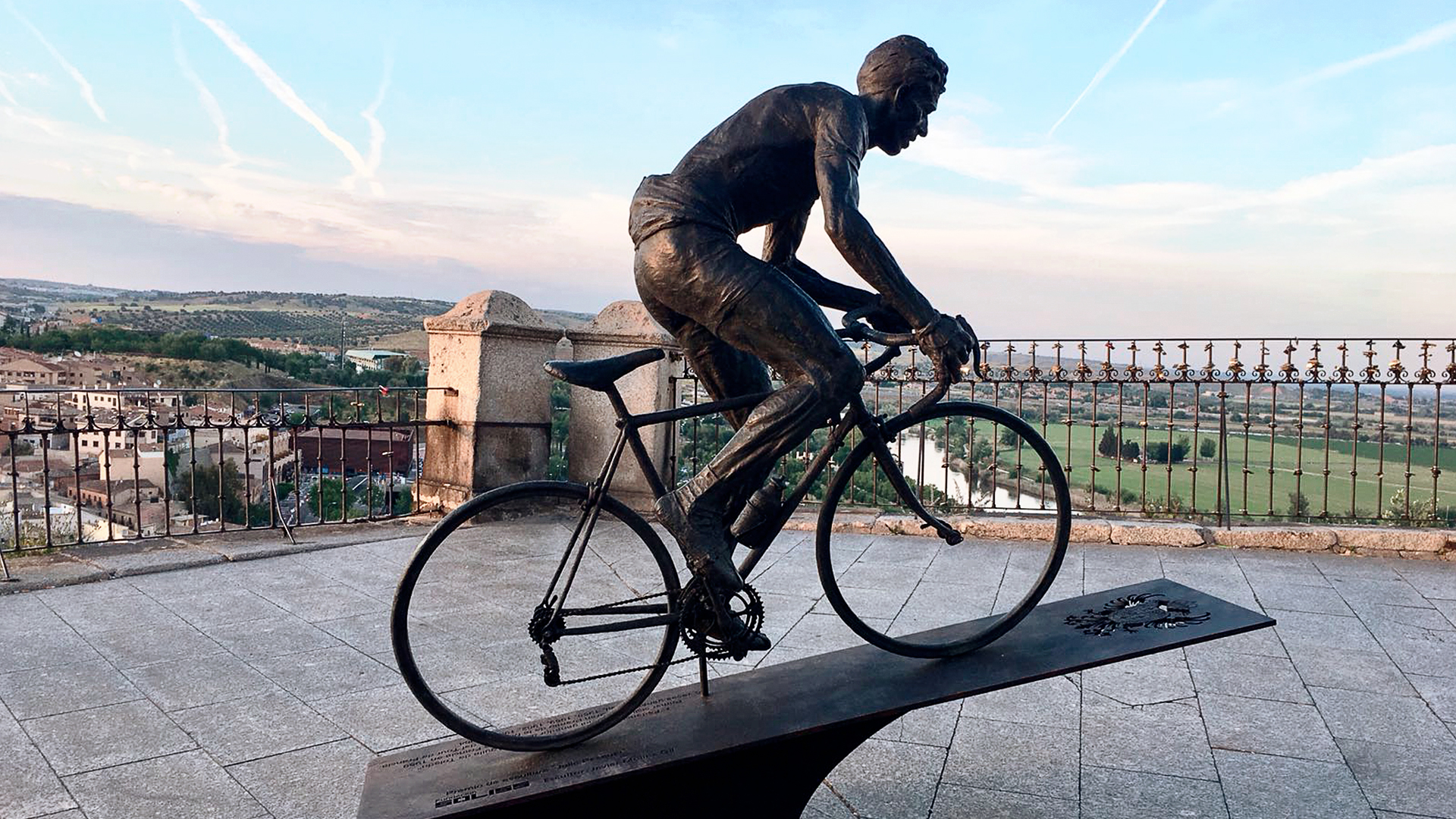
Monument of Federico Bahamontes in Toledo (Spain) donated by Fundación Soliss

== Retirement ==
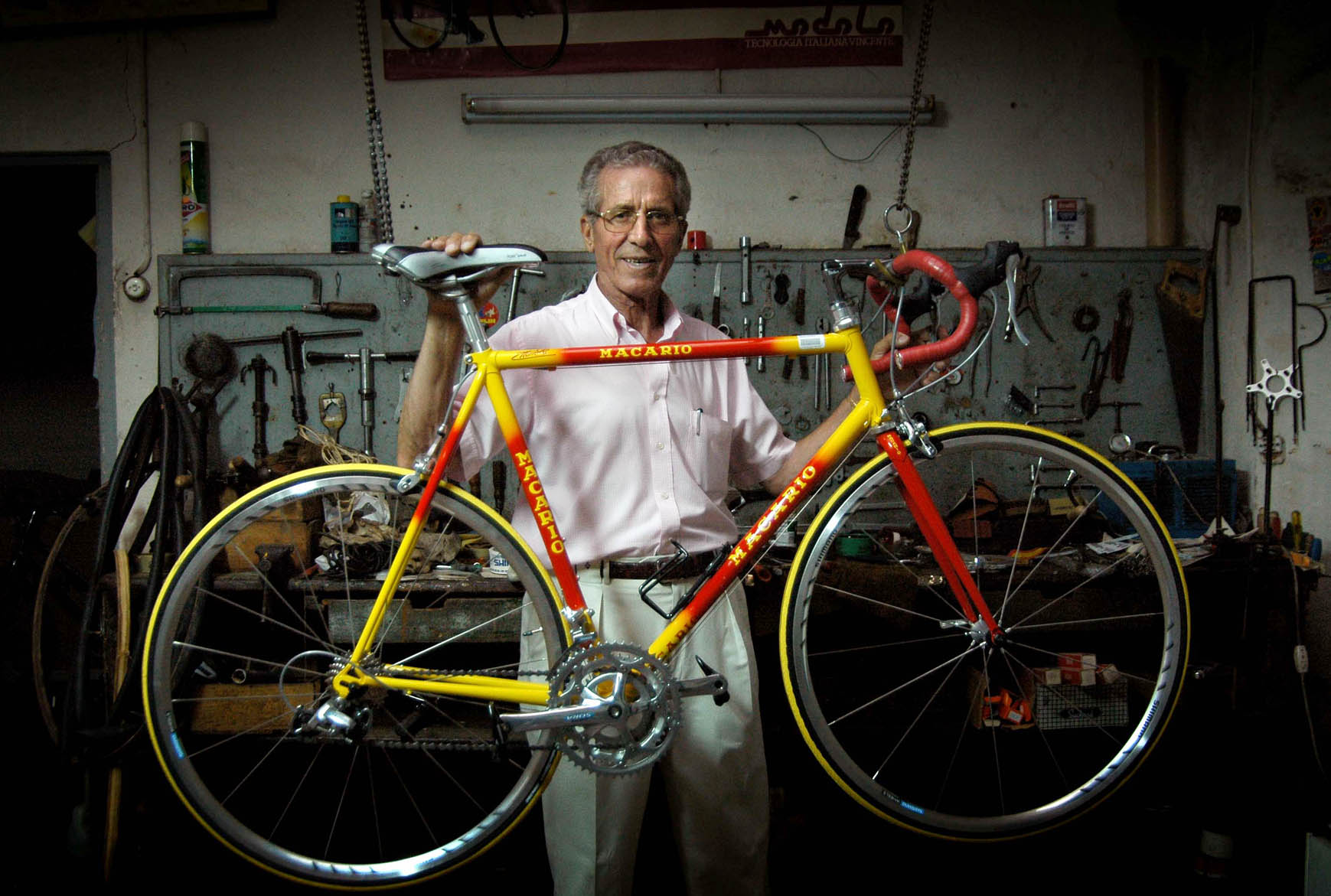
Bahamontes in his bicycle shop in Toledo in 2005

Following his retirement, Bahamontes opened a bicycle and motorcycle shop in Toledo and offered to lead visitors through a museum dedicated to his career.

In 2013, during his 85th birthday that coincided with the 100th edition of Le Tour de France, he was named the best climber in the history of the race, ahead of French rider Richard Virenque, by a jury selected by L' Équipe newspaper. Members of the jury included active riders, such as the popular French rider Thomas Voeckler, and others such as five-time winner of the race Bernard Hinault, as well as the general director of Le Tour de France Christian Prudhomme. The award was given by the French President François Hollande. Also, he has been honoured with the Premio Nacional Francisco Fernández Ochoa.

Following the death of Roger Walkowiak in 2017, Bahamontes became the oldest living Tour de France winner. Following Bahamontes' death, 1968 Tour winner Jan Janssen took over this position.

Bahamontes died on 8 August 2023. He was 95 years old. His home town of Toledo declared two days of mourning following his death.

== Career achievements ==
=== Major results ===
1949
1st Overall Tour d'Ávila
1950
1st Road race, National Amateur Road Championships
1951
1st Overall Tour d'Ávila
1952
1st Vuelta a Albacete
1953
1st Circuit Sardiniero
2nd Trofeo Jaumendreu
8th Overall Volta a Catalunya
1954
Tour de France

1st Mountains classification

1st Nice–Mont Agel
3rd Overall Vuelta a Mallorca
1st Stage 3a
2nd Overall Gran Premio de la Bicicleta Eibarresa
1955
1st Clasica a los Puertos de Guadarrama
1st Monaco–Golf du Mont Agel
1st Mont Faron hill climb
1st Overall Vuelta a Asturias

1st Stage 6

1st Stage 2 Gran Premio de la Bicicleta Eibarresa
5th Overall Volta a Catalunya

1st Stages 6 & 9

1956
1st Mountains classification Giro d'Italia (shared)
2nd Mont Faron Hill Climb
4th Overall Tour de France
4th Overall Vuelta a España
1957
1st Overall Vuelta a Asturias

1st Stage 1

1st Mont Faron hill climb
2nd Overall Vuelta a España

1st Mountains classification
1st Stage 3

5th Overall Vuelta a Levante

1st Stage 3b

10th Overall Volta a Catalunya
1958
National Road Championships

1st Road race
1st Time trial

1st Stage 4 Giro d'Italia
1st Subida a Arrate
6th Overall Vuelta a España

1st Mountains classification

8th Overall Tour de France

1st Mountains classification
1st Stages 14 & 20

1959
1st Overall Tour de France

1st Mountains classification
1st Stage 15

1st Stage 4 Vuelta a España
1st Subida a Arrate
1st National Hill Climb Championship
3rd Overall Tour de Suisse

1st Stages 3 & 5

1960
1st Stage 13 Vuelta a España
1st Subida a Arrate
1st Overall Grand Prix de Pliego

1st 2 stages

1961
1st Subida a Arrate
1st Nice–Golf du Mont Agel
1st Monaco–Golf du Mont Agel
1st Stage 4 Giro di Sardegna
2nd Mont Faron hill climb
1962
Tour de France

1st Mountains classification
1st Stage 13

1st Mont Faron road race
1st Mont Faron hill climb
1st Subida a Arrate
1st Nice–Golf du Mont Agel
1st Monaco–Golf du Mont Agel
4th Overall Critérium du Dauphiné Libéré
5th Overall Tour de Luxembourg
7th Overall Tour de Romandie

1st Stage 3

1963
1st Mont Faron hill climb
2nd Overall Tour de France

1st Mountains classification
1st Stage 15

2nd Overall Tour de Romandie
2nd Subida a Arrate
4th Overall Grand Prix du Midi Libre
5th Overall Critérium du Dauphiné Libéré

1st Mountains classification

1964
1st Mont Faron road race
1st Mont Faron hill climb
1st Subida al Naranco
1st Six Days of Madrid (with Rik Van Steenbergen)
3rd Overall Tour de France

1st Mountains classification
1st Stages 8 & 16

6th Overall Critérium du Dauphiné Libéré
1965
1st Circuit du Provençal
1st Escalada a Montjuïc
2nd Subida a Arrate
3rd Subida a Urkiola
10th Overall Vuelta a España

=== Grand Tour general classification results timeline ===
Grand Tour	1954	1955	1956	1957	1958	1959	1960	1961	1962	1963	1964	1965
Vuelta a España	N/A	21	4	2	6	DNF	DNF	—	—	—	—	10
Giro d'Italia	—	—	DNF	—	17	—	—	DNF	—	—	—	—
Tour de France	25	—	4	DNF	8	1	DNF	—	14	2	3	DNF

Legend
—	Did not compete
DNF	Did not finish
N/A	Race not held

==== Grand Tour record ====
	1954	1955	1956	1957	1958	1959	1960	1961	1962	1963	1964	1965
Vuelta a España	N/A	21	4	2	6	DNF-11	HD-15	DNE	DNE	DNE	DNE	10
Stages won	N/A	0	0	1	0	1	1	—	—	—	—	0
Points classification	N/A	NR	4	3	NR	—	—	—	—	—	—	NR
Mountains classification	N/A	5	2	1	1	—	—	—	—	—	—	5
Giro d'Italia	DNE	DNE	DNF-18	DNE	17	DNE	DNE	DNF-16	DNE	DNE	DNE	DNE
Stages won	—	—	0	—	1	—	—	0	—	—	—	—
Mountains classification	—	—	1 (Note: Although Bahamontes DNF on stage 18 he was still awarded KOM as there were three separate KOM classifications at the 1956 Giro d'Italia; Bahamontes won the Trofeo Appennini classification, of which all points possible had already been awarded before Bahmanotes' departure from the race.)	—	4	—	—	—	—	—	—	—
Tour de France	25	DNE	4	DNF-9	8	1	DNF-2	DNE	14	2	3	DNF-10
Stages won	0	—	0	0	2	1	0	—	1	1	2	0
Points classification	NR	—	NR	—	NR	4	—	—	NR	3	12	—
Mountains classification	1	—	2	—	1	1	—	—	1	1	1	—

Legend
1	Winner
2–3	Top three-finish
4–10	Top ten-finish
11–	Other finish
DNE	Did not enter
DNF-x	Did not finish (retired on stage x)
DNS-x	Did not start (not started on stage x)
HD-x	Finished outside time limit (occurred on stage x)
DSQ	Disqualified
N/A	Race/classification not held
NR	Not ranked in this classification

== See also ==
- Statue of Federico Martín Bahamontes

== Bibliography ==
- Fotheringham, Alasdair (2012). The Eagle of Toledo: The Life and Times of Federico Bahamontes, the Tour's Greatest Climber. London: Aurum Press. ISBN 978-1-78131-037-3.
- McGann, Bill; McGann, Carol (2006). The Story of the Tour de France: How a Newspaper Promotion Became the Greatest Sporting Event in the World. Volume 1: 1903–1964. Vol. 1. Indianapolis: Dog Ear Publishing. ISBN 978-1-59858-180-5.
