= Claude Colette =

French cyclist

Personal information
- Born: 4 May 1929 Châtellerault, France
- Died: 20 September 1990 (aged 61) Toulouse, France

Cycling career
- Sport: Cycling
- Role: Rider

Claude Colette (4 May 1929 – 20 September 1990) was a French professional racing cyclist. He rode in six editions of the Tour de France.
