= Marcel Rohrbach =

French cyclist

Personal information
- Born: 8 April 1933 Ahun, France
- Died: 14 March 2012 (aged 78) Vélizy-Villacoublay, France

Cycling career
- Sport: Cycling
- Discipline: Road
- Role: Rider

Professional team
- 1957–1963: Peugeot–BP–Dunlop

Major wins
- Grand Tours Vuelta a España 1 individual stage (1961) Stage races Critérium du Dauphiné (1957)

Marcel Rohrbach (8 April 1933 Ahun – 14 March 2012; Vélizy-Villacoublay) was a French racing cyclist. He finished in ninth place at the 1960 Tour de France and won the 1957 Critérium du Dauphiné Libéré. He also won a stage of the 1961 Vuelta a España.

== Major results ==
1955
3rd Overall Circuit d'Auvergne

1st Stage 2

1956
2nd Overall Tour d'Europe
1957
1st Overall Critérium du Dauphiné Libéré
2nd Road race, National Road Championships
1958
1st Circuit du Mont-Blanc
1st Stage 5 Critérium du Dauphiné Libéré
4th Overall Grand Prix du Midi Libre
9th Overall Tour de Romandie
1959
6th Overall Critérium du Dauphiné Libéré

1st Stage 4

1960
1st Circuit des Boucles de la Seine
9th Overall Tour de France
1961
1st Stage 1b Vuelta a España
2nd Liège–Bastogne–Liège
3rd Overall Weekend ardennais
8th Genoa–Nice
1962
2nd Road race, National Road Championships
