= Hilaire Couvreur =

Belgian cyclist

- Couvreur in 1960

Personal information
- Born: 22 September 1924 Bruges, Belgium
- Died: 17 February 1998 (aged 73) Kortrijk, Belgium

Cycling career
- Sport: Cycling
- Role: Rider

Professional teams
- 1947: Lygie-Pirelli
- 1948: Lygie-Pirelli & Arliguie-Hutchinson
- 1949: Lygie-Pirelli
- 1950-1951: Terrot-Wolber
- 1952-1954: Terrot-Hutchinson
- 1954-1955: Girardengo-Eldoarado
- 1955-1956: Elvé-Peugeot
- 1955-1956: Cora
- 1957: Peugeot-Dunlop
- 1958-1959: Faema-Guerra-Clément
- 1960: Helyett-Leroux-Fynsec-Hutchinson
- 1961-1962: Carpano

Major wins
- Stage races Tour d'Algérie (1949, 1950) Tour du Maroc (1953) Tour of Valencia (1958) One-day races and Classics Omloop der Zuid-West-Vlaamse Bergen (1948) Elfstedenronde (1952, 1954) Omloop van Oost-Vlaanderen (1953)

Hilaire Couvreur (22 September 1924 – 17 February 1998) was a Belgian cyclist.

Couvreur was winner of the Tour du Maroc in 1953 and the Volta a la Comunitat Valenciana in 1958. He also finished third in the 1958 Vuelta a España.

He was born in Sint-Andries near Brugge in Belgium and died in Kortrijk, Belgium.

== Major results ==
1947
1st stage 4 Ronde van Limburg amateurs
1st stage 5 Tour of Belgium independents
1948
1st Omloop der Zuid-West-Vlaamse Bergen
3rd Gent–Wevelgem
3rd Omloop van de Vlasstreek
1949
1st Overall Tour d'Algérie
1950
1st Overall Tour d'Algérie
1951
1st stage 4 Tour of Belgium
1952
1st Elfstedenronde
2nd Nationale Sluitingsprijs
2nd Omloop der Zuid-West-Vlaamse Bergen
1953
1st Overall Tour du Maroc

1st Stage 4

1st Omloop van Oost-Vlaanderen
4th Overall Tour of Belgium
8th Tour of Flanders
8th Paris–Roubaix
1954
1st Elfstedenronde
1st Stage 12 Giro d'Italia
2nd Tour d'Europe
2nd Trofee Luc Van Biesen
3rd Omloop der Vlaamse Ardennen
5th Overall Paris–Nice
1955
1st Stage 1b Driedaagse van Antwerpen (TTT)
1956
10th Overall Giro d'Italia
1957
1st Stage 4 Volta a Catalunya
1958
1st Overall Tour of Valencia

1st Stage 3 (TTT)

4th Overall Vuelta a España
1959
1st Stage 4 Tour of Valencia
3rd GP Marcel Kint
7th Overall Vuelta a España
1960
1st Stage 4b Menton–Genova–Roma
1961
2nd Overall Tour de Suisse

Winner mountains classification

3rd Roma–Napoli–Roma
