= Julio San Emeterio =

Spanish cyclist

Personal information
- Born: 31 March 1930 Torrelavega, Spain
- Died: 28 April 2010 (aged 80) San Felices de Buelna, Spain

Cycling career
- Sport: Cycling
- Role: Rider

Julio San Emeterio (31 March 1930 – 28 April 2010) was a Spanish professional racing cyclist. He rode in five editions of the Tour de France.
