= Salvador Botella =

Spanish cyclist (1929–2006)

Personal information
- Full name: Salvador Botella Rodrigo
- Born: 27 March 1929 Almussafes, Spain
- Died: 18 December 2006 (aged 77) Ribarroja del Turia, Spain

Cycling career
- Sport: Cycling
- Discipline: Road
- Role: Rider

Professional teams
- 1954: Ideor
- 1955: Ignis
- 1956: Splendid
- 1957: Ignis–Doniselli
- 1958–1962: Faema–Guerra

Salvador Botella Rodrigo (March 27, 1929 – December 18, 2006) was a Spanish road bicycle racer, who competed as a professional from 1953 to 1962. He won the Volta a Catalunya in 1953 and 1959. He participated in 19 Grand Tours, including eight editions of the Vuelta a España, seven of the Giro d'Italia, and four of the Tour de France. He won the Points classification in 1958 Vuelta a España.

== Major results ==
1953
1st Volta a Catalunya

1st Stage 3

1954
1st Stage 3 Euskal Bizikleta
1st Overall Vuelta a Levante
4th Overall Volta a Catalunya
1955
1st Trofeo Jaumendreu
1st Stage 10 Volta a Catalunya
1st Stage 3 Tour des Pyrénées
2nd Overall Vuelta a Andalucía

1st Stage 8

8th Overall Giro d'Italia
1956
1st Stage 4 Euskal Bizikleta
2nd Trofeo Jaumendreu
1957
2nd Overall Vuelta a Levante

1st Stages 4 & 6

2nd Overall Volta a Catalunya

1st Stage 8

3rd Overall Vuelta a La Rioja

1st Stages 2 & 3

6th Trofeo Masferrer
10th Overall Vuelta a España
1958
1st Points classification Vuelta a España
1st Stage 3 Giro d'Italia
2nd National Road Race Championships
1959
1st Volta a Catalunya
3rd Overall Euskal Bizikleta
1960
1st Stage 4 Giro d'Italia
7th Overall Vuelta a España

1st Stages 1 (TTT) & 9

1961
1st Overall Vuelta a Levante
1st Stages 6 & 8 Vuelta a Andalucía
