= List of teams and cyclists in the 1955 Vuelta a España =

For the 1955 Vuelta a España, the field consisted of 106 riders; 63 finished the race.

== By rider ==
Legend
No.	Starting number worn by the rider during the Vuelta
Pos.	Position in the general classification
DNF	Denotes a rider who did not finish

No.	Name	Nationality	Team	Pos.	Ref
1	Federico Bahamontes	Spain	Spain A	21	
2	Salvador Botella	Spain	Spain A	11	
3	Jesús Loroño	Spain	Spain A	4	
4	Francisco Masip	Spain	Spain A	31	
5	Miguel Poblet	Spain	Spain A	DNF	
6	Bernardo Ruiz	Spain	Spain A	14	
7	Francisco Alomar	Spain	Spain B	44	
8	Emilio Rodríguez	Spain	Spain B	24	
9	José Gómez del Moral	Spain	Spain B	16	
10	Manuel Rodríguez	Spain	Spain B	22	
11	Andrés Trobat	Spain	Spain B	15	
12	José Escolano	Spain	Spain B	30	
13	Edi Gieseler	West Germany	Germany	DNF	
14	Günter Otte	West Germany	Germany	DNF	
16	Günther Pankoke	West Germany	Germany	41	
17	Franz Reitz	West Germany	Germany	DNF	
19	Arsène Bauwens	Belgium	Benelux	17	
20	Theo Brunswyck	Belgium	Benelux	26	
21	Alfred Kain	Austria	Benelux	DNF	
22	Jan Nolten	Netherlands	Benelux	DNF	
23	Kurt Schneider	Austria	Benelux	60	
24	Roger Wyckstandt	Belgium	Benelux	DNF	
25	Gilbert Bauvin	France	France	36	
26	Louis Bergaud	France	France	DNF	
27	Jean Dotto	France	France	1	
28	Raphaël Géminiani	France	France	3	
29	Nello Lauredi	France	France	23	
30	Raoul Rémy	France	France	42	
31	Ian Brown	Great Britain	Great Britain	DNF	
32	Joe Christison	Great Britain	Great Britain	DNF	
33	Ken Mitchell	Great Britain	Great Britain	DNF	
34	John Pottier	Great Britain	Great Britain	DNF	
35	Leslie Scales	Great Britain	Great Britain	DNF	
36	Ian Steel	Great Britain	Great Britain	DNF	
37	Pierino Baffi	Italy	Italy A	27	
38	Mario Baroni	Italy	Italy A	28	
39	Silvio Pedroni	Italy	Italy A	29	
40	Fiorenzo Magni	Italy	Italy A	13	
41	Alfredo Martini	Italy	Italy A	46	
42	Donato Piazza	Italy	Italy A	43	
43	Marcel Huber	Switzerland	Switzerland	DNF	
44	Max Meier	Switzerland	Switzerland	62	
45	Hans Rudolf	Switzerland	Switzerland	59	
46	Armin Russenberger	Switzerland	Switzerland	50	
47	Eugene Schlegel	Switzerland	Switzerland	DNF	
48	Oskar von Büren	Switzerland	Switzerland	53	
49	Giuseppe Pintarelli	Italy	Italy B	47	
50	Giuseppe Buratti	Italy	Italy B	8	
51	Franco Giacchero	Italy	Italy B	40	
52	Antonio Uliana	Italy	Italy B	49	
53	Bruno Landi	Italy	Italy B	DNF	
54	Gastone Nencini	Italy	Italy B	18	
55	Philippe Agut	France	France South-east	34	
56	Louis Caput	France	France South-east	55	
57	Jean Carle	France	France South-east	DNF	
58	Georges Gay	France	France South-east	10	
59	Apo Lazaridès	France	France South-east	DNF	
60	Jacques Vivier	France	France South-east	DNF	
61	Miguel Alarcón	Spain	Balearics	DNF	
62	Juan Bibiloni	Spain	Balearics	32	
63	Gabriel Company	Spain	Balearics	6	
64	Antonio Gelabert	Spain	Balearics	20	
65	Miguel Gual	Spain	Balearics	25	
66	Miguel Bover	Spain	Balearics	DNF	
67	Victorio García	Spain	Castile	35	
68	Juan Jose Gil	Spain	Castile	DNF	
69	Raúl Motos	Spain	Castile	DNF	
70	José Herrero Berrendero	Spain	Castile	DNF	
71	Fernando Manzaneque	Spain	Castile	57	
72	Amadeo Gil	Spain	Castile	61	
73	Jaime Calucho	Spain	Catalonia	38	
74	Mariano Corrales	Spain	Catalonia	DNF	
75	Miguel Chacón	Spain	Catalonia	33	
76	Vicente Iturat	Spain	Catalonia	5	
77	Gabriel Saura	Spain	Catalonia	51	
78	José Serra	Spain	Catalonia	7	
79	Juan Calucho	Spain	Catalonia-Aragon	DNF	
80	Ricardo Catalan	Spain	Catalonia-Aragon	48	
81	Jose Gascon	Spain	Catalonia-Aragon	DNF	
82	Joaquín Filba	Spain	Catalonia-Aragon	45	
83	José Mateo	Spain	Catalonia-Aragon	DNF	
84	Antonio Jiménez Quiles	Spain	Catalonia-Aragon	2	
85	Pedro San Jose	Spain	Galicia-Asturias-Leon-Valladolid	DNF	
86	Senen Blanco	Spain	Galicia-Asturias-Leon-Valladolid	39	
87	Francisco Moreno	Spain	Galicia-Asturias-Leon-Valladolid	19	
88	Domingo Piñeiro	Spain	Galicia-Asturias-Leon-Valladolid	DNF	
89	Julio San Emeterio	Spain	Galicia-Asturias-Leon-Valladolid	56	
90	José Luis Labrador	Spain	Galicia-Asturias-Leon-Valladolid	DNF	
91	Vicente Aramburu	Spain	Guipuzkoa-Navarre	DNF	
92	Ponciano Arbelaiz	Spain	Guipuzkoa-Navarre	DNF	
93	Jesús Galdeano	Spain	Guipuzkoa-Navarre	DNF	
94	Hortensio Vidaurreta	Spain	Guipuzkoa-Navarre	DNF	
95	Julián Salaverría	Spain	Guipuzkoa-Navarre	DNF	
96	Miguel Vidaurreta	Spain	Guipuzkoa-Navarre	52	
97	José Hernández	Spain	Levante	DNF	
98	Salvador Jarque	Spain	Levante	58	
99	René Marigil	Spain	Levante	DNF	
100	José Perez de las Heras	Spain	Levante	63	
101	José Pérez Llácer	Spain	Levante	DNF	
102	Vicente Perez Perez	Spain	Levante	DNF	
103	Cosme Barrutia	Spain	Biscay	9	
104	Óscar Elguezabal	Spain	Biscay	DNF	
105	Antonio Ferraz	Spain	Biscay	DNF	
106	José Antonio Landa	Spain	Biscay	54	
107	Carmelo Morales	Spain	Biscay	12	
108	Tomás Oñaederra	Spain	Biscay	37	
