= 1955 Vuelta a España, Stage 9 to Stage 15 =

Cycling race stages

The 1955 Vuelta a España was the 10th edition of Vuelta a España, one of cycling's Grand Tours. The Tour began in Bilbao on 23 April and Stage 9 occurred on 2 May with a stage from Tortosa. The race finished in Bilbao on 8 May.

== Stage 9 ==
2 May 1955 - Tortosa to Valencia, 190 km (118.1 mi)

Route:

Stage 9 result

| Rank | Rider | Team | Time |
|---|---|---|---|
| 1 | Pierino Baffi (ITA) | Italy A | 5h 09' 37" |
| 2 | Juan Bibiloni (ESP) | Balearics | s.t. |
| 3 | Georges Gay (FRA) | France South-east | s.t. |
| 4 | Nello Lauredi (FRA) | France | s.t. |
| 5 | Jan Nolten (NED) | Benelux | s.t. |
| 6 | Giuseppe Pintarelli (ITA) | Italy B | s.t. |
| 7 | José Gómez del Moral (ESP) | Spain B | + 7' 41" |
| 8 | Fiorenzo Magni (ITA) | Italy A | + 10' 03" |
| 9 | Oskar von Büren (SUI) | Switzerland | s.t. |
| 10 | Vicente Iturat (ESP) | Catalonia | s.t. |

General classification after Stage 9

| Rank | Rider | Team | Time |
|---|---|---|---|
| 1 | René Marigil (ESP) | Levante | 47h 31' 05" |
| 2 | Raphaël Géminiani (FRA) | France | + 2' 56" |
| 3 | Jesús Loroño (ESP) | Spain A | + 3' 48" |
| 4 | José Serra (ESP) | Catalonia | + 4' 24" |
| 5 | Vicente Iturat (ESP) | Catalonia | + 4' 38" |
| 6 | José Mateo (ESP) | Catalonia-Aragon | + 6' 38" |
| 7 | José Gómez del Moral (ESP) | Spain B | + 6' 42" |
| 8 | Giuseppe Buratti (ITA) | Italy B | + 6' 51" |
| 9 | Georges Gay (FRA) | France South-east | + 6' 59" |
| 10 | Jan Nolten (NED) | Benelux | + 7' 21" |

== Stage 10 ==
3 May 1955 - Valencia to Cuenca, 222 km (137.9 mi)

Route:

Stage 10 result

| Rank | Rider | Team | Time |
|---|---|---|---|
| 1 | Antonio Uliana (ITA) | Italy B | 6h 47' 57" |
| 2 | Antonio Jiménez Quiles (ESP) | Catalonia-Aragon | s.t. |
| 3 | Jean Dotto (FRA) | France | s.t. |
| 4 | Cosme Barrutia (ESP) | Biscay | s.t. |
| 5 | José Escolano (ESP) | Spain B | + 6' 38" |
| 6 | Fiorenzo Magni (ITA) | Italy A | + 11' 48" |
| 7 | Raoul Rémy (FRA) | France | s.t. |
| 8 | Vicente Iturat (ESP) | Catalonia | s.t. |
| 9 | Oskar von Büren (SUI) | Switzerland | s.t. |
| 10 | Gastone Nencini (ITA) | Italy B | s.t. |

General classification after Stage 10

| Rank | Rider | Team | Time |
|---|---|---|---|
| 1 | Jean Dotto (FRA) | France | 54h 28' 41" |
| 2 | René Marigil (ESP) | Levante | + 2' 09" |
| 3 | Antonio Jiménez Quiles (ESP) | Catalonia-Aragon | + 2' 22" |
| 4 | Raphaël Géminiani (FRA) | France | + 5' 05" |
| 5 | Jesús Loroño (ESP) | Spain A | + 5' 57" |
| 6 | José Serra (ESP) | Catalonia | + 6' 23" |
| 7 | Vicente Iturat (ESP) | Catalonia | + 6' 45" |
| 8 | Gabriel Company (ESP) | Balerarics | + 6' 47" |
| 9 | José Mateo (ESP) | Catalonia-Aragon | + 8' 47" |
| 10 | José Gómez del Moral (ESP) | Spain B | + 8' 51" |

== Stage 11 ==
4 May 1955 - Cuenca to Madrid, 168 km (104.4 mi)

Route:

Stage 11 result

| Rank | Rider | Team | Time |
|---|---|---|---|
| 1 | Donato Piazza (ITA) | Italy A | 4h 51' 07" |
| 2 | Philippe Agut (FRA) | France South-east | s.t. |
| 3 | Francisco Alomar (ESP) | Spain B | s.t. |
| 4 | Francisco Moreno (ESP) | Galicia-Asturias-Leon-Valladolid | s.t. |
| 5 | Miguel Bover (ESP) | Balearics | + 8' 03" |
| 6 | Jacques Vivier (FRA) | France South-east | s.t. |
| 7 | Federico Bahamontes (ESP) | Spain A | s.t. |
| 8 | Franco Giacchero (ITA) | Italy B | + 10' 23" |
| 9 | Jesús Galdeano (ESP) | Guipuzkoa-Navarre | s.t. |
| 10 | Bernardo Ruiz (ESP) | Spain A | + 14' 13" |

General classification after Stage 11

| Rank | Rider | Team | Time |
|---|---|---|---|
| 1 | Jean Dotto (FRA) | France | 59h 34' 05" |
| 2 | René Marigil (ESP) | Levante | + 2' 09" |
| 3 | Antonio Jiménez Quiles (ESP) | Catalonia-Aragon | + 2' 22" |
| 4 | Raphaël Géminiani (FRA) | France | + 5' 05" |
| 5 | Jesús Loroño (ESP) | Spain A | + 5' 57" |
| 6 | José Serra (ESP) | Catalonia | + 6' 23" |
| 7 | Vicente Iturat (ESP) | Catalonia | + 6' 45" |
| 8 | Gabriel Company (ESP) | Balerarics | + 6' 47" |
| 9 | José Mateo (ESP) | Catalonia-Aragon | + 8' 47" |
| 10 | Giuseppe Buratti (ITA) | Italy B | + 9' 00" |

== Stage 12 ==
5 May 1955 - Madrid – Madrid, 15 km (9.3 mi) (TTT)

Route:

Stage 12 result

| Rank | Team | Time |
|---|---|---|
| 1 | Italy A | 54' 47" |
| 2 | Italy B | + 49" |
| 3 | France | + 1' 43" |
| 4 | Catalonia | s.t. |
| 5 | Balearics | + 2' 22" |
| 6 | Spain A | + 2' 31" |
| 7 | Spain B | + 3' 31" |
| 8 | Biscay | s.t. |
| 9 | Switzerland | + 4' 07" |
| 10 | Galicia-Asturias-Leon-Valladolid | + 4' 31" |

General classification after Stage 12

| Rank | Rider | Team | Time |
|---|---|---|---|
| 1 | Jean Dotto (FRA) | France | 59h 52' 55" |
| 2 | René Marigil (ESP) | Levante | + 3' 17" |
| 3 | Antonio Jiménez Quiles (ESP) | Catalonia-Aragon | + 3' 27" |
| 4 | Raphaël Géminiani (FRA) | France | + 5' 05" |
| 5 | Jesús Loroño (ESP) | Spain A | + 6' 13" |
| 6 | José Serra (ESP) | Catalonia | + 6' 23" |
| 7 | Vicente Iturat (ESP) | Catalonia | + 6' 45" |
| 8 | Gabriel Company (ESP) | Balerarics | + 7' 00" |
| 9 | Giuseppe Buratti (ITA) | Italy B | + 8' 42" |
| 10 | Cosme Barrutia (ESP) | Biscay | + 9' 37" |

== Stage 13 ==
6 May 1955 - Madrid to Valladolid, 222 km (138 mi)

Route:

Stage 13 result

| Rank | Rider | Team | Time |
|---|---|---|---|
| 1 | Fiorenzo Magni (ITA) | Italy A | 5h 45' 31" |
| 2 | Mario Baroni (ITA) | Italy A | s.t. |
| 3 | Antonio Gelabert (ESP) | Balearics | s.t. |
| 4 | Salvador Botella (ESP) | Spain A | s.t. |
| 5 | Theo Brunswyck (BEL) | Benelux | s.t. |
| 6 | Jesús Loroño (ESP) | Spain A | s.t. |
| 7 | Bernardo Ruiz (ESP) | Spain A | s.t. |
| 8 | Manuel Rodríguez (ESP) | Spain B | s.t. |
| 9 | Andrés Trobat (ESP) | Spain B | s.t. |
| 10 | Arsène Bauwens (BEL) | Benelux | s.t. |

General classification after Stage 13

| Rank | Rider | Team | Time |
|---|---|---|---|
| 1 | Jean Dotto (FRA) | France | 65h 38' 26" |
| 2 | Antonio Jiménez Quiles (ESP) | Catalonia-Aragon | + 3' 27" |
| 3 | Raphaël Géminiani (FRA) | France | + 5' 05" |
| 4 | Jesús Loroño (ESP) | Spain A | + 6' 13" |
| 5 | José Serra (ESP) | Catalonia | + 6' 23" |
| 6 | Vicente Iturat (ESP) | Catalonia | + 6' 45" |
| 7 | Gabriel Company (ESP) | Balerarics | + 7' 00" |
| 8 | Giuseppe Buratti (ITA) | Italy B | + 8' 42" |
| 9 | René Marigil (ESP) | Levante | + 9' 28" |
| 10 | Cosme Barrutia (ESP) | Biscay | + 9' 37" |

== Stage 14 ==
7 May 1955 - Valladolid to Bilbao, 308 km (191 mi)

Route:

Stage 14 result

| Rank | Rider | Team | Time |
|---|---|---|---|
| 1 | Donato Piazza (ITA) | Italy A | 10h 29' 30" |
| 2 | Mariano Corrales (ESP) | Catalonia | + 1" |
| 3 | Francisco Alomar (ESP) | Spain B | + 3' 53" |
| 4 | Günther Pankoke (FRG) | Germany | + 6' 11" |
| 5 | Theo Brunswyck (BEL) | Benelux | s.t. |
| 6 | Fernando Manzaneque (ESP) | Castile | + 6' 32" |
| 7 | Carmelo Morales (ESP) | Biscay | + 8' 46" |
| 8 | Giuseppe Pintarelli (ITA) | Italy B | + 9' 04" |
| 9 | Bruno Landi (ITA) | Italy B | + 9' 05" |
| 10 | Günter Otte (FRG) | Germany | + 9' 56" |

General classification after Stage 14

| Rank | Rider | Team | Time |
|---|---|---|---|
| 1 | Jean Dotto (FRA) | France | 76h 20' 58" |
| 2 | Antonio Jiménez Quiles (ESP) | Catalonia-Aragon | + 3' 27" |
| 3 | Raphaël Géminiani (FRA) | France | + 5' 05" |
| 4 | Jesús Loroño (ESP) | Spain A | + 6' 13" |
| 5 | José Serra (ESP) | Catalonia | + 6' 23" |
| 6 | Vicente Iturat (ESP) | Catalonia | + 6' 45" |
| 7 | Gabriel Company (ESP) | Balerarics | + 7' 00" |
| 8 | Giuseppe Buratti (ITA) | Italy B | + 8' 42" |
| 9 | Cosme Barrutia (ESP) | Biscay | + 9' 37" |
| 10 | Georges Gay (FRA) | France South-east | + 10' 05" |

== Stage 15 ==
8 May 1955 - Bilbao to Bilbao, 147 km (91 mi)

Route:

Stage 15 result

| Rank | Rider | Team | Time |
|---|---|---|---|
| 1 | Fiorenzo Magni (ITA) | Italy A | 4h 42' 43" |
| 2 | Georges Gay (FRA) | France South-east | s.t. |
| 3 | Vicente Iturat (ESP) | Catalonia | s.t. |
| 4 | Salvador Botella (ESP) | Spain A | s.t. |
| 5 | Alfredo Martini (ITA) | Italy A | s.t. |
| 6 | Antonio Gelabert (ESP) | Balearics | s.t. |
| 7 | Gabriel Company (ESP) | Balerarics | s.t. |
| 8 | Jesús Loroño (ESP) | Spain A | s.t. |
| 9 | Andrés Trobat (ESP) | Spain B | s.t. |
| 10 | Antonio Jiménez Quiles (ESP) | Catalonia-Aragon | s.t. |

General classification after Stage 15

| Rank | Rider | Team | Time |
|---|---|---|---|
| 1 | Jean Dotto (FRA) | France | 81h 04' 02" |
| 2 | Antonio Jiménez Quiles (ESP) | Catalonia-Aragon | + 3' 06" |
| 3 | Raphaël Géminiani (FRA) | France | + 5' 05" |
| 4 | Jesús Loroño (ESP) | Spain A | + 5' 54" |
| 5 | Vicente Iturat (ESP) | Catalonia | + 6' 24" |
| 6 | Gabriel Company (ESP) | Balerarics | + 6' 39" |
| 7 | José Serra (ESP) | Catalonia | + 7' 31" |
| 8 | Giuseppe Buratti (ITA) | Italy B | + 8' 42" |
| 9 | Cosme Barrutia (ESP) | Biscay | + 9' 37" |
| 10 | Georges Gay (FRA) | France South-east | + 9' 44" |
