= List of teams and cyclists in the 1956 Vuelta a España =

For the 1956 Vuelta a España, the field consisted of 90 riders; 40 finished the race.

== By rider ==
Legend
| No. | Starting number worn by the rider during the Vuelta |
| Pos. | Position in the general classification |
| DNF | Denotes a rider who did not finish |

| No. | Name | Nationality | Team | Pos. | Ref |
|---|---|---|---|---|---|
| 1 | Jean Dotto | France | France | DNF | |
| 2 | Louison Bobet | France | France | DNF | |
| 3 | Jean Bobet | France | France | DNF | |
| 4 | Maurice Lampre | France | France | 37 | |
| 5 | Gilbert Bauvin | France | France | 7 | |
| 6 | Louis Bergaud | France | France | DNF | |
| 7 | Raoul Rémy | France | France | DNF | |
| 8 | Eugène Telotte | France | France | DNF | |
| 9 | Claude Le Ber | France | France | DNF | |
| 10 | Roger Walkowiak | France | France | DNF | |
| 11 | Federico Bahamontes | Spain | Spain | 4 | |
| 12 | Antonio Barrutia | Spain | Spain | 20 | |
| 13 | Salvador Botella | Spain | Spain | DNF | |
| 14 | Miguel Bover | Spain | Spain | DNF | |
| 15 | Jesús Galdeano | Spain | Spain | 33 | |
| 16 | Francisco Masip | Spain | Spain | 28 | |
| 17 | Jesús Loroño | Spain | Spain | 2 | |
| 18 | René Marigil | Spain | Spain | 21 | |
| 19 | Miguel Poblet | Spain | Spain | DNF | |
| 20 | Bernardo Ruiz | Spain | Spain | 31 | |
| 21 | Nino Defilippis | Italy | Italy | 18 | |
| 22 | Giancarlo Astrua | Italy | Italy | 12 | |
| 23 | Angelo Conterno | Italy | Italy | 1 | |
| 24 | Nino Favero | Italy | Italy | 27 | |
| 25 | Giuseppe Buratti | Italy | Italy | 13 | |
| 26 | Roberto Falaschi | Italy | Italy | DNF | |
| 27 | Arigo Padovan | Italy | Italy | 19 | |
| 28 | Mauro Gianneschi | Italy | Italy | 38 | |
| 29 | Giuliano Michelon | Italy | Italy | 35 | |
| 30 | Giovanni Pettinati | Italy | Italy | 24 | |
| 31 | Hugo Koblet | Switzerland | Switzerland Mixed | DNF | |
| 32 | Heinz Müller | West Germany | Switzerland Mixed | DNF | |
| 33 | Brian Robinson | Great Britain | Switzerland Mixed | 8 | |
| 34 | Emilio Croci Torti | Switzerland | Switzerland Mixed | DNF | |
| 35 | Remo Pianezzi | Switzerland | Switzerland Mixed | 25 | |
| 36 | Martin Metzger | Switzerland | Switzerland Mixed | DNF | |
| 37 | Oskar von Büren | Switzerland | Switzerland Mixed | DNF | |
| 38 | Ian Steel | Great Britain | Switzerland Mixed | DNF | |
| 39 | Tony Hoar | Great Britain | Switzerland Mixed | DNF | |
| 40 | Rudi Theissen | West Germany | Switzerland Mixed | 30 | |
| 41 | Rik Van Steenbergen | Belgium | Belgium | 5 | |
| 42 | Hilaire Couvreur | Belgium | Belgium | 16 | |
| 43 | Emile Severeyns | Belgium | Belgium | DNF | |
| 44 | Edgard Sorgeloos | Belgium | Belgium | 22 | |
| 45 | Raymond Impanis | Belgium | Belgium | 3 | |
| 46 | Jef Verhelst | Belgium | Belgium | DNF | |
| 47 | Norbert Kerckhove | Belgium | Belgium | DNF | |
| 48 | Arsene Bauwens | Belgium | Belgium | DNF | |
| 49 | André Noyelle | Belgium | Belgium | DNF | |
| 50 | Willy Schroeders | Belgium | Belgium | DNF | |
| 51 | Cosme Barrutia | Spain | Cantabria | 15 | |
| 52 | Antonio Ferraz | Spain | Cantabria | 32 | |
| 53 | Carmelo Morales | Spain | Cantabria | 14 | |
| 54 | Benigno Azpuru | Spain | Cantabria | 39 | |
| 55 | Adolfo Cruz | Spain | Cantabria | 26 | |
| 56 | Emilio Rodríguez | Spain | Cantabria | 11 | |
| 57 | Manuel Rodríguez | Spain | Cantabria | 10 | |
| 58 | Hortensio Vidauretta | Spain | Cantabria | DNF | |
| 59 | Miguel Vidauretta | Spain | Cantabria | 40 | |
| 60 | Felipe Alberdi | Spain | Cantabria | DNF | |
| 61 | [[Mariano Corrales Lausín|Mariano Corrales]] | Spain | Centre-South | DNF | |
| 62 | Antonio Gelabert | Spain | Centre-South | DNF | |
| 63 | Francisco Moreno | Spain | Centre-South | 36 | |
| 64 | Antonio Jiménez Quiles | Spain | Centre-South | 29 | |
| 65 | José Catala | Spain | Centre-South | DNF | |
| 66 | Antonio Suárez | Spain | Centre-South | DNF | |
| 67 | Raúl Motos | Spain | Centre-South | DNF | |
| 68 | Emilio Hernan | Spain | Centre-South | DNF | |
| 69 | Miguel Vilana | Spain | Centre-South | DNF | |
| 70 | Pedro Guzman | Spain | Centre-South | DNF | |
| 71 | Jose Escolano | Spain | Pyrenees | 34 | |
| 72 | Juan Crespo | Spain | Pyrenees | DNF | |
| 73 | Miguel Chacón | Spain | Pyrenees | 6 | |
| 74 | Joan Escolà | Spain | Pyrenees | DNF | |
| 75 | Vicente Iturat | Spain | Pyrenees | 23 | |
| 76 | Juan Campillo | Spain | Pyrenees | DNF | |
| 77 | José Mateo | Spain | Pyrenees | DNF | |
| 78 | Gabriel Saura | Spain | Pyrenees | DNF | |
| 79 | José Serra | Spain | Pyrenees | 9 | |
| 80 | Miguel Pacheco | Spain | Pyrenees | DNF | |
| 81 | Miguel Alarcón | Spain | Mediterranean | DNF | |
| 82 | Matias Alemany | Spain | Mediterranean | DNF | |
| 83 | Miguel Gual | Spain | Mediterranean | DNF | |
| 84 | José Gómez del Moral | Spain | Mediterranean | DNF | |
| 85 | José Pérez Llácer | Spain | Mediterranean | DNF | |
| 86 | José Perez de las Heras | Spain | Mediterranean | DNF | |
| 87 | Andrés Trobat | Spain | Mediterranean | DNF | |
| 88 | Gabriel Company | Spain | Mediterranean | DNF | |
| 89 | Juan Bibiloni | Spain | Mediterranean | 17 | |
| 90 | Antonio Castell | Spain | Mediterranean | DNF | |
