= 1955 Vuelta a España, Stage 1 to Stage 8 =

Cycling race stages

The 1955 Vuelta a España was the 10th edition of Vuelta a España, one of cycling's Grand Tours. The Tour began in Bilbao on 23 April and Stage 8 occurred on 1 May with a stage to Tortosa. The race finished in Bilbao on 8 May.

== Stage 1 ==
23 April 1955 - Bilbao to San Sebastián, 240 km (149.1 mi)

Route:

Stage 1 result and General Classification after Stage 1

Rank	Rider	Team	Time
1	Gilbert Bauvin (FRA)	France	6h 07' 08"
2	Giuseppe Buratti (ITA)	Italy B	+ 34"
3	Andrés Trobat (ESP)	Spain B	+ 35"
4	José Gómez del Moral (ESP)	Spain B	+ 40"
5	Bernardo Ruiz (ESP)	Spain A	+ 1' 12"
6	Fiorenzo Magni (ITA)	Italy A	+ 1' 18"
7	Gastone Nencini (ITA)	Italy B	s.t.
8	Francisco Masip (ESP)	Spain A	s.t.
9	Raphaël Géminiani (FRA)	France	s.t.
10	Salvador Botella (ESP)	Spain A	s.t.

== Stage 2 ==
24 April 1955 - San Sebastián to Bayonne, 211 km (131.1 mi)

Route:

Stage 2 result

Rank	Rider	Team	Time
1	Gilbert Bauvin (FRA)	France	6h 22' 06"
2	Federico Bahamontes (ESP)	Spain A	s.t.
3	Jesús Loroño (ESP)	Spain A	s.t.
4	Emilio Rodríguez (ESP)	Spain B	s.t.
5	Cosme Barrutia (ESP)	Biscay	s.t.
6	Louis Bergaud (FRA)	France	s.t.
7	Miguel Poblet (ESP)	Spain A	+ 1' 14"
8	Vicente Iturat (ESP)	Catalonia	s.t.
9	Fiorenzo Magni (ITA)	Italy A	s.t.
10	Gabriel Saura (ESP)	Catalonia	s.t.

General classification after Stage 2

Rank	Rider	Team	Time
1	Gilbert Bauvin (FRA)	France	12h 29' 13"
2	Federico Bahamontes (ESP)	Spain A	+ 3' 31"
3	Jesús Loroño (ESP)	Spain A	s.t.
4	Louis Bergaud (FRA)	France	s.t.
5	Cosme Barrutia (ESP)	Biscay	s.t.
6	Giuseppe Buratti (ITA)	Italy B	+ 3' 49"
7	Andrés Trobat (ESP)	Spain B	+ 3' 50"
8	José Gómez del Moral (ESP)	Spain B	+ 3' 55"
9	Bernardo Ruiz (ESP)	Spain A	+ 4' 27"
10	Fiorenzo Magni (ITA)	Italy A	+ 4' 33"

== Stage 3 ==
25 April 1955 - Bayonne to Pamplona, 157 km (98 mi)

Route:

Stage 3 result

Rank	Rider	Team	Time
1	Antonio Gelabert (ESP)	Balearics	4h 27' 46"
2	Raphaël Géminiani (FRA)	France	+ 2"
3	Gabriel Company (ESP)	Balerarics	s.t.
4	Jesús Loroño (ESP)	Spain A	+ 10"
5	José Mateo (ESP)	Catalonia-Aragon	+ 1' 11"
6	Salvador Botella (ESP)	Spain A	+ 1' 12"
7	Emilio Rodríguez (ESP)	Spain B	+ 1' 16"
8	Giuseppe Buratti (ITA)	Italy B	+ 1' 17"
9	Miguel Gual (ESP)	Balearics	+ 3' 59"
10	Jan Nolten (NED)	Benelux	+ 4' 32"

General classification after Stage 3

Rank	Rider	Team	Time
1	Jesús Loroño (ESP)	Spain A	16h 58' 27"
2	Giuseppe Buratti (ITA)	Italy B	+ 3' 38"
3	Gilbert Bauvin (FRA)	France	+ 3' 46"
4	José Mateo (ESP)	Catalonia-Aragon	+ 4' 16"
5	Salvador Botella (ESP)	Spain A	+ 4' 17"
6	Raphaël Géminiani (FRA)	France	+ 4' 49"
7	Louis Bergaud (FRA)	France	+ 5' 09"
8	Federico Bahamontes (ESP)	Spain A	+ 5' 53"
9	Gabriel Company (ESP)	Balerarics	+ 6' 31"
10	José Gómez del Moral (ESP)	Spain B	+ 7' 35"

== Stage 4 ==
26 April 1955 - Pamplona to Zaragoza, 229 km (142 mi)

Route:

Stage 4 result

Rank	Rider	Team	Time
1	Jesús Galdeano (ESP)	Guipuzkoa-Navarre	6h 02' 43"
2	José Serra (ESP)	Catalonia	+ 10"
3	Mariano Corrales (ESP)	Catalonia	+ 3' 22"
4	Theo Brunswyck (BEL)	Benelux	s.t.
5	Fiorenzo Magni (ITA)	Italy A	+ 3' 38"
6	Gilbert Bauvin (FRA)	France	s.t.
7	Vicente Iturat (ESP)	Catalonia	s.t.
8	Federico Bahamontes (ESP)	Spain A	s.t.
9	Franz Reitz (FRG)	Germany	s.t.
10	Salvador Botella (ESP)	Spain A	s.t.

General classification after Stage 4

Rank	Rider	Team	Time
1	Jesús Loroño (ESP)	Spain A	23h 04' 48"
2	Giuseppe Buratti (ITA)	Italy B	+ 3' 38"
3	Gilbert Bauvin (FRA)	France	+ 3' 46"
4	José Mateo (ESP)	Catalonia-Aragon	+ 4' 16"
5	Salvador Botella (ESP)	Spain A	+ 4' 27"
6	Raphaël Géminiani (FRA)	France	+ 4' 49"
7	José Serra (ESP)	Catalonia	+ 4' 56"
8	Louis Bergaud (FRA)	France	+ 5' 09"
9	Federico Bahamontes (ESP)	Spain A	+ 5' 53"
10	Gabriel Company (ESP)	Balerarics	+ 6' 31"

== Stage 5 ==
27 April 1955 - Zaragoza to Lleida, 195 km (121 mi)

Route:

Stage 5 result

Rank	Rider	Team	Time
1	Gabriel Company (ESP)	Balerarics	5h 01' 00"
2	Gabriel Saura (ESP)	Catalonia	s.t.
3	Kurt Schneider (AUT)	Benelux	s.t.
4	Nello Lauredi (FRA)	France	s.t.
5	Raphaël Géminiani (FRA)	France	s.t.
6	Philippe Agut (FRA)	France South-east	s.t.
7	Emilio Rodríguez (ESP)	Spain B	s.t.
8	Arsène Bauwens (BEL)	Benelux	s.t.
9	Louis Bergaud (FRA)	France	s.t.
10	Georges Gay (FRA)	France South-east	s.t.

General classification after Stage 5

Rank	Rider	Team	Time
1	Raphaël Géminiani (FRA)	France	28h 10' 37"
2	José Serra (ESP)	Catalonia	+ 7"
3	Louis Bergaud (FRA)	France	+ 15"
4	Jesús Loroño (ESP)	Spain A	+ 52"
5	Gabriel Company (ESP)	Balerarics	+ 1' 42"
6	Georges Gay (FRA)	France South-east	+ 2' 55"
7	Giuseppe Buratti (ITA)	Italy B	+ 4' 30"
8	José Mateo (ESP)	Catalonia-Aragon	+ 5' 08"
9	Salvador Botella (ESP)	Spain A	+ 5' 09"
10	Federico Bahamontes (ESP)	Spain A	+ 6' 45"

== Stage 6 ==
28 April 1955 - Lleida to Barcelona, 230 km (140 mi)

Route:

Stage 6 result

Rank	Rider	Team	Time
1	Pierino Baffi (ITA)	Italy A	7h 01' 05"
2	Miguel Gual (ESP)	Balearics	s.t.
3	Vicente Iturat (ESP)	Catalonia	s.t.
4	Philippe Agut (FRA)	France South-east	s.t.
5	Franz Reitz (FRG)	Germany	s.t.
6	Ian Steel (GBR)	Great Britain	s.t.
7	Arsène Bauwens (BEL)	Benelux	s.t.
8	Jean Dotto (FRA)	France	s.t.
9	Jacques Vivier (FRA)	France South-east	+ 2' 46"
10	Miguel Poblet (ESP)	Spain A	+ 4' 01"

General classification after Stage 6

Rank	Rider	Team	Time
1	Raphaël Géminiani (FRA)	France	35h 19' 42"
2	Louis Bergaud (FRA)	France	+ 15"
3	Jesús Loroño (ESP)	Spain A	+ 52"
4	José Serra (ESP)	Catalonia	+ 1' 18"
5	Gabriel Company (ESP)	Balerarics	+ 1' 42"
6	José Mateo (ESP)	Catalonia-Aragon	+ 3' 42"
7	Giuseppe Buratti (ITA)	Italy B	+ 4' 30"
8	Salvador Botella (ESP)	Spain A	+ 5' 09"
9	José Gómez del Moral (ESP)	Spain B	+ 6' 08"
10	Jean Dotto (FRA)	France	+ 6' 43"

== Stage 7 ==
30 April 1955 - Barcelona to Barcelona, 29 km (18 mi) (ITT)

Stage 7 result

Rank	Rider	Team	Time
1	Fiorenzo Magni (ITA)	Italy A	34' 28"
2	Mario Baroni (ITA)	Italy A	+ 1"
3	Silvio Pedroni (ITA)	Italy A	+ 10"
4	Günther Pankoke (FRG)	Germany	s.t.
5	Günter Otte (FRG)	Germany	s.t.
6	Pierino Baffi (ITA)	Italy A	s.t.
7	Giuseppe Buratti (ITA)	Italy B	s.t.
8	Donato Piazza (ITA)	Italy A	s.t.
9	Franz Reitz (FRG)	Germany	s.t.
10	Miguel Poblet (ESP)	Spain A	+ 45"

General classification after Stage 7

Rank	Rider	Team	Time
1	Raphaël Géminiani (FRA)	France	35h 54' 55"
2	Louis Bergaud (FRA)	France	+ 15"
3	Jesús Loroño (ESP)	Spain A	+ 52"
4	José Serra (ESP)	Catalonia	+ 1' 18"
5	Gabriel Company (ESP)	Balerarics	+ 1' 42"
6	José Mateo (ESP)	Catalonia-Aragon	+ 3' 42"
7	Giuseppe Buratti (ITA)	Italy B	+ 3' 55"
8	Salvador Botella (ESP)	Spain A	+ 5' 09"
9	José Gómez del Moral (ESP)	Spain B	+ 6' 08"
10	Jean Dotto (FRA)	France	+ 6' 43"

== Stage 8 ==
1 May 1955 - Barcelona to Tortosa, 213 km (132 mi)

Route:

Stage 8 result

Rank	Rider	Team	Time
1	Vicente Iturat (ESP)	Catalonia	6h 07' 10"
2	Mario Baroni (ITA)	Italy A	s.t.
3	Louis Caput (FRA)	France South-east	s.t.
4	René Marigil (ESP)	Levante	+ 6"
5	Theo Brunswyck (BEL)	Benelux	+ 31"
6	Gabriel Saura (ESP)	Catalonia	+ 12' 12"
7	Miguel Bover (ESP)	Balearics	+ 12' 16"
8	Antonio Uliana (ITA)	Italy B	s.t.
9	Fiorenzo Magni (ITA)	Italy A	s.t.
10	Federico Bahamontes (ESP)	Spain A	s.t.

General classification after Stage 8

Rank	Rider	Team	Time
1	René Marigil (ESP)	Levante	42h 11' 25"
2	Raphaël Géminiani (FRA)	France	+ 2' 56"
3	Louis Bergaud (FRA)	France	+ 3' 11"
4	Jesús Loroño (ESP)	Spain A	+ 3' 50"
5	José Serra (ESP)	Catalonia	+ 4' 14"
6	Vicente Iturat (ESP)	Catalonia	+ 4' 36"
7	Gabriel Company (ESP)	Balerarics	+ 4' 40"
8	José Mateo (ESP)	Catalonia-Aragon	+ 6' 38"
9	Giuseppe Buratti (ITA)	Italy B	+ 6' 51"
10	Salvador Botella (ESP)	Spain A	+ 8' 05"
