= List of teams and cyclists in the 1957 Vuelta a España =

For the 1957 Vuelta a España, the field consisted of 90 riders; 54 finished the race.

== By rider ==
Legend
No.	Starting number worn by the rider during the Vuelta
Pos.	Position in the general classification
DNF	Denotes a rider who did not finish

No.	Name	Nationality	Team	Pos.	Ref
1	Renzo Accordi	Italy	Italy	29	
2	Guido Boni	Italy	Italy	11	
3	Rino Benedetti	Italy	Italy	36	
4	Mario Baroni	Italy	Italy	46	
5	Gianni Ferlenghi	Italy	Italy	41	
6	Pasquale Fornara	Italy	Italy	8	
7	Nino Assirelli	Italy	Italy	51	
8	Bruno Tognaccini	Italy	Italy	40	
9	Gastone Nencini	Italy	Italy	9	
10	Donato Piazza	Italy	Italy	DNF	
11	Federico Bahamontes	Spain	Spain	2	
12	Salvador Barrutia	Spain	Spain	26	
13	Salvador Botella	Spain	Spain	10	
14	Gabriel Company	Spain	Spain	DNF	
15	Antonio Ferraz	Spain	Spain	20	
16	Jesús Galdeano	Spain	Spain	34	
17	Jesús Loroño	Spain	Spain	1	
18	Julio San Emeterio	Spain	Spain	48	
19	José Serra	Spain	Spain	38	
20	Andrés Trobat	Spain	Spain	DNF	
21	Gilbert Bauvin	France	France	24	
22	Adolphe Deledda	France	France	49	
23	Jean Dotto	France	France	13	
24	Raphaël Géminiani	France	France	5	
25	Roger Hassenforder	France	France	DNF	
26	Raymond Hoorelbeke	France	France	33	
27	Camille Huyghe	France	France	DNF	
28	Jean Malléjac	France	France	19	
29	Albert Platel	France	France	52	
30	Roger Walkowiak	France	France	15	
31	Jan Adriaensens	Belgium	Belgium	7	
32	Roger Baens	Belgium	Belgium	22	
33	Jean Borcy	Belgium	Belgium	DNF	
34	Hilaire Couvreur	Belgium	Belgium	DNF	
35	Lucien De Munster	Belgium	Belgium	DNF	
36	Gustave Van Vaerenbergh	Belgium	Belgium	DNF	
37	André Rosseel	Belgium	Belgium	30	
38	Roger Wyckstand	Belgium	Belgium	DNF	
39	Emiel Van Cauter	Belgium	Belgium	37	
40	Jean Vermaelen	Belgium	Belgium	DNF	
41	José Firmino Assunção	Portugal	Portugal	DNF	
42	Alves Barbosa	Portugal	Portugal	17	
43	Joaquim Gomes Carvalho	Portugal	Portugal	DNF	
44	Agostino Gomes Ferreira	Portugal	Portugal	53	
45	Artur Guimarães Coelho	Portugal	Portugal	DNF	
46	Manuel Graça	Portugal	Portugal	DNF	
47	José Carlos Pereira Carvalho	Portugal	Portugal	DNF	
48	José Manuel Ribeiro da Silva	Portugal	Portugal	4	
49	Joaquim Sousa Santos	Portugal	Portugal	DNF	
50	Joao Tavares	Portugal	Portugal	DNF	
51	Benigno Aspuru	Spain	Cantabria	23	
52	Cosme Barrutia	Spain	Cantabria	45	
53	Tomás Oñaederra	Spain	Cantabria	DNF	
54	Adolfo Cruz	Spain	Cantabria	DNF	
55	José Michelena	Spain	Cantabria	31	
56	Carmelo Morales	Spain	Cantabria	16	
57	Emilio Rodríguez	Spain	Cantabria	42	
58	Manuel Rodriguez	Spain	Cantabria	27	
59	Hortensio Vidaurreta	Spain	Cantabria	32	
60	Facundo Zabaleta	Spain	Cantabria	DNF	
61	José Gómez del Moral	Spain	Central-South	35	
62	Santiago Montilla	Spain	Central-South	DNF	
63	Pedro Guzman	Spain	Central-South	50	
64	Emilio Hernán	Spain	Central-South	43	
65	Antonio Jiménez Quiles	Spain	Central-South	DNF	
66	Fernando Manzaneque	Spain	Central-South	DNF	
67	Francisco Moreno	Spain	Central-South	6	
68	Raúl Motos	Spain	Central-South	44	
69	José Perez de las Heras	Spain	Central-South	47	
70	Antonio Suárez	Spain	Central-South	21	
71	Juan Campillo	Spain	Pyrenees	25	
72	Juan Crespo	Spain	Pyrenees	39	
73	Miguel Chacón	Spain	Pyrenees	DNF	
74	Juan Escolà	Spain	Pyrenees	28	
75	José Escolano	Spain	Pyrenees	DNF	
76	Vicente Iturat	Spain	Pyrenees	12	
77	Francisco Masip	Spain	Pyrenees	18	
78	Miguel Pacheco	Spain	Pyrenees	DNF	
79	Alberto Sant	Spain	Pyrenees	14	
80	Aniceto Utset	Spain	Pyrenees	DNF	
81	Juan Amor	Spain	Mediterranean	DNF	
82	Luis Navarro	Spain	Mediterranean	DNF	
83	Juan Bibiloni	Spain	Mediterranean	DNF	
84	Antonio Castell	Spain	Mediterranean	54	
85	José Hernández	Spain	Mediterranean	DNF	
86	Antonio Karmany	Spain	Mediterranean	DNF	
87	René Marigil	Spain	Mediterranean	DNF	
88	Gabriel Mas	Spain	Mediterranean	DNF	
89	Miguel Bover	Spain	Mediterranean	DNF	
90	Bernardo Ruiz	Spain	Mediterranean	3	
