= List of teams and cyclists in the 1958 Tour de France =

List of cyclists

In the 1958 Tour de France, 120 cyclists entered, divided into 10 teams of 12 cyclists each. France, Italy, Belgium and Spain each sent a national team. The Netherlands and Luxembourg had a combined team, as had Switzerland and Germany. There was also one "international" team, consisting of cyclists from Austria, Portugal, Great Britain and Denmark. There were also three regional French teams: Centre-Midi, West/South West and Paris/North East. The French team had had some problems with the selection, as Jacques Anquetil, the winner of the 1957 Tour de France, did not want to share leadership with Louison Bobet, winner in 1953, 1954 and 1955. Anquetil had been so superior in 1957, that he did not want Bobet and Géminiani both in his team. The French team selector then chose to include Bobet in the national team. Raphael Géminiani, who had been in the French national team since 1949, was demoted into the regional Centre-Midi team. Géminiani was not pleased, and sent the French team director Marcel Bidot a jack-ass named "Marcel" to express his displeasure.

Charly Gaul, part of the Dutch/Luxembourgian team, anticipated so little help from his teammates that he announced that he would not share prizes. His teammates then refused to support him, so Gaul was on his own.

== Start list ==
=== By team ===
France
No.	Rider	Pos.
1	Jacques Anquetil (FRA)	DNF
2	Gilbert Bauvin (FRA)	15
3	Louis Bergaud (FRA)	9
4	Louison Bobet (FRA)	7
5	André Darrigade (FRA)	21
6	Jean Forestier (FRA)	DNF
7	Joseph Groussard (FRA)	25
8	François Mahé (FRA)	DNF
9	Francis Pipelin (FRA)	61
10	René Privat (FRA)	60
11	Jean Stablinski (FRA)	68
12	Roger Walkowiak (FRA)	75

Italy
No.	Rider	Pos.
21	Pierino Baffi (ITA)	63
22	Emilio Bottecchia (ITA)	38
23	Rizzardo Brenioli (ITA)	43
24	Antonino Catalano (ITA)	19
25	Gilberto Dall'Agata (ITA)	50
26	Giuseppe Fallarini (ITA)	DNF
27	Vito Favero (ITA)	2
28	Gianni Ferlenghi (ITA)	24
29	Pietro Nascimbene (ITA)	34
30	Gastone Nencini (ITA)	5
31	Arigo Padovan (ITA)	45
32	Giuseppe Pintarelli (ITA)	65

Belgium
No.	Rider	Pos.
41	Jan Adriaensens (BEL)	4
42	Jean Brankart (BEL)	DNF
43	Pino Cerami (BEL)	DNF
44	Armand Desmet (BEL)	33
45	Gilbert Desmet (BEL)	DNF
46	Noël Foré (BEL)	DNF
47	Jos Hoevenaers (BEL)	10
48	Marcel Janssens (BEL)	DNF
49	Hendryck Luyten (BEL)	52
50	Jef Planckaert (BEL)	6
51	Martin Van Geneugden (BEL)	27
52	André Vlayen (BEL)	DNF

Spain
No.	Rider	Pos.
61	Federico Bahamontes (ESP)	8
62	Salvador Botella (ESP)	DNF
63	Miguel Bover (ESP)	72
64	Jesús Galdeano (ESP)	59
65	Fernando Manzaneque (ESP)	20
66	Carmelo Morales (ESP)	DNF
67	Francisco Moreno (ESP)	71
68	Luis Otaño (ESP)	56
69	Miguel Pacheco (ESP)	DNF
70	Bernardo Ruiz (ESP)	55
71	Julio San Emeterio (ESP)	DNF
72	Antonio Suárez (ESP)	64

Netherlands/Luxembourg
No.	Rider	Pos.
81	Piet Damen (NED)	11
82	Piet De Jongh (NED)	41
83	Jaap Kersten (NED)	44
84	Jef Lahaye (NED)	DNF
85	Wim van Est (NED)	46
86	Piet van Est (NED)	22
87	Gerrit Voorting (NED)	47
88	Martin Van Den Borgh (NED)	DNF
89	Aldo Bolzan (ITA)	32
90	Marcel Ernzer (LUX)	16
91	Charly Gaul (LUX)	1
92	Jean-Pierre Schmitz (LUX)	37

Switzerland/Germany
No.	Rider	Pos.
101	Ernest Ecuyer (SUI)	74
102	Walter Favre (SUI)	78
103	Anton Graeser (SUI)	30
104	Jean-Claude Grèt (SUI)	67
105	Hans Hollenstein (SUI)	DNF
106	Ernst Traxel (SUI)	42
107	Gunther Debussmann (FRG)	DNF
108	Lothar Friedrich (FRG)	12
109	Lothar Loder (FRG)	DNF
110	Reinhold Pommer (FRG)	DNF
111	Frans Reitz (FRG)	36
112	Horst Tueller (FRG)	58

International
No.	Rider	Pos.
121	Adolf Christian (AUT)	28
122	Rudolf Maresch (AUT)	DNF
123	Antonino Baptista (POR)	DNF
124	Antonio Barbosa Alves (POR)	76
125	Seamus Elliott (IRL)	48
126	Stan Brittain (GBR)	68
127	Ron Coe (GBR)	DNF
128	Brian Robinson (GBR)	DNF
129	Hans Andresen (DEN)	62
130	Eluf Dalgaard (DEN)	DNF
131	Kaj Allan Olsen (DEN)	DNF
132	Fritz Ravn (DEN)	DNF

France – Centre-Midi
No.	Rider	Pos.
141	Henry Anglade (FRA)	17
142	Mario Bertolo (ITA)	77
143	Emmanuel Busto (FRA)	31
144	Claude Colette (FRA)	DNF
145	Jean Dotto (FRA)	DNF
146	Georges Gay (FRA)	DNF
147	Raphaël Géminiani (FRA)	3
148	Jean Graczyk (FRA)	14
149	Pierre Polo (FRA)	39
150	Marcel Rohrbach (FRA)	26
151	Antonin Rolland (FRA)	66
152	Roger Chaussabel (FRA)	70

France – West/South-West
No.	Rider	Pos.
161	Jean Bourlès (FRA)	DNF
162	Jean Gainche (FRA)	29
163	Maurice Lavigne (FRA)	DNF
164	Camille Le Menn (FRA)	54
165	Eugène Letendre (FRA)	DNF
166	Jean Malléjac (FRA)	DNF
167	Robert Roudaut (FRA)	DNF
168	Joseph Morvan (FRA)	35
169	Fernand Picot (FRA)	49
170	Tino Sabbadini (FRA)	53
171	Joseph Thomin (FRA)	18
172	Robert Varnajo (FRA)	DNF

France – Paris/North-East
No.	Rider	Pos.
181	Jean-Claude Annaert (FRA)	23
182	Claude Barmier (FRA)	DNF
183	Nicolas Barone (FRA)	DNF
184	Stanislas Bober (FRA)	73
185	Jean Dacquay (FRA)	DNF
186	Serge David (FRA)	51
187	Édouard Delberghe (FRA)	13
188	André Dupré (FRA)	DNF
189	Raymond Hoorelbeke (FRA)	57
190	Fernand Lamy (FRA)	40
191	Maurice Moucheraud (FRA)	DNF
192	Maurice Quentin (FRA)	DNF

=== By rider ===
Legend
No.	Starting number worn by the rider during the Tour
Pos.	Position in the general classification
DNF	Denotes a rider who did not finish

No.	Name	Nationality	Team	Pos.	Ref
1	Jacques Anquetil	France	France	DNF	
2	Gilbert Bauvin	France	France	15	
3	Louis Bergaud	France	France	9	
4	Louison Bobet	France	France	7	
5	André Darrigade	France	France	21	
6	Jean Forestier	France	France	DNF	
7	Joseph Groussard	France	France	25	
8	François Mahé	France	France	DNF	
9	Francis Pipelin	France	France	61	
10	René Privat	France	France	60	
11	Jean Stablinski	France	France	68	
12	Roger Walkowiak	France	France	75	
21	Pierino Baffi	Italy	Italy	63	
22	Emilio Bottecchia	Italy	Italy	38	
23	Rizzardo Brenioli	Italy	Italy	43	
24	Antonino Catalano	Italy	Italy	19	
25	Gilberto Dall'Agata	Italy	Italy	50	
26	Giuseppe Fallarini	Italy	Italy	DNF	
27	Vito Favero	Italy	Italy	2	
28	Gianni Ferlenghi	Italy	Italy	24	
29	Pietro Nascimbene	Italy	Italy	34	
30	Gastone Nencini	Italy	Italy	5	
31	Arigo Padovan	Italy	Italy	45	
32	Giuseppe Pintarelli	Italy	Italy	65	
41	Jan Adriaensens	Belgium	Belgium	4	
42	Jean Brankart	Belgium	Belgium	DNF	
43	Pino Cerami	Belgium	Belgium	DNF	
44	Armand Desmet	Belgium	Belgium	33	
45	Gilbert Desmet	Belgium	Belgium	DNF	
46	Noël Foré	Belgium	Belgium	DNF	
47	Jos Hoevenaers	Belgium	Belgium	10	
48	Marcel Janssens	Belgium	Belgium	DNF	
49	Rik Luyten	Belgium	Belgium	52	
50	Jef Planckaert	Belgium	Belgium	6	
51	Martin Van Geneugden	Belgium	Belgium	27	
52	André Vlayen	Belgium	Belgium	DNF	
61	Federico Bahamontes	Spain	Spain	8	
62	Salvador Botella	Spain	Spain	DNF	
63	Miguel Bover	Spain	Spain	72	
64	Jesús Galdeano	Spain	Spain	59	
65	Fernando Manzaneque	Spain	Spain	20	
66	Carmelo Morales	Spain	Spain	DNF	
67	Francisco Moreno	Spain	Spain	71	
68	Luis Otaño	Spain	Spain	56	
69	Miguel Pacheco	Spain	Spain	DNF	
70	Bernardo Ruiz	Spain	Spain	55	
71	Julio San Emeterio	Spain	Spain	DNF	
72	Antonio Suárez	Spain	Spain	64	
81	Piet Damen	Netherlands	Netherlands/Luxembourg	11	
82	Piet De Jongh	Netherlands	Netherlands/Luxembourg	41	
83	Jaap Kersten	Netherlands	Netherlands/Luxembourg	44	
84	Jef Lahaye	Netherlands	Netherlands/Luxembourg	DNF	
85	Wim van Est	Netherlands	Netherlands/Luxembourg	46	
86	Piet van Est	Netherlands	Netherlands/Luxembourg	22	
87	Gerrit Voorting	Netherlands	Netherlands/Luxembourg	47	
88	Martin Van Den Borgh	Netherlands	Netherlands/Luxembourg	DNF	
89	Aldo Bolzan	Italy	Netherlands/Luxembourg	32	
90	Marcel Ernzer	Luxembourg	Netherlands/Luxembourg	16	
91	Charly Gaul	Luxembourg	Netherlands/Luxembourg	1	
92	Jean-Pierre Schmitz	Luxembourg	Netherlands/Luxembourg	37	
101	Ernest Ecuyer	Switzerland	Switzerland/Germany	74	
102	Walter Favre	Switzerland	Switzerland/Germany	78	
103	Anton Graeser	Switzerland	Switzerland/Germany	30	
104	Jean-Claude Grèt	Switzerland	Switzerland/Germany	67	
105	Hans Hollenstein	Switzerland	Switzerland/Germany	DNF	
106	Ernst Traxel	Switzerland	Switzerland/Germany	42	
107	Günther Debusmann	West Germany	Switzerland/Germany	DNF	
108	Lothar Friedrich	West Germany	Switzerland/Germany	12	
109	Mathias Löder	West Germany	Switzerland/Germany	DNF	
110	Reinhold Pommer	West Germany	Switzerland/Germany	DNF	
111	Frans Reitz	West Germany	Switzerland/Germany	36	
112	Horst Tueller	West Germany	Switzerland/Germany	58	
121	Adolf Christian	Austria	International	28	
122	Rudolf Maresch	Austria	International	DNF	
123	Antonino Baptista	Portugal	International	DNF	
124	Antonio Barbosa Alves	Portugal	International	76	
125	Seamus Elliott	Ireland	International	48	
126	Stan Brittain	Great Britain	International	68	
127	Ron Coe	Great Britain	International	DNF	
128	Brian Robinson	Great Britain	International	DNF	
129	Hans Andresen	Denmark	International	62	
130	Eluf Dalgaard	Denmark	International	DNF	
131	Kaj Allan Olsen	Denmark	International	DNF	
132	Fritz Ravn	Denmark	International	DNF	
141	Henry Anglade	France	France – Centre-Midi	17	
142	Mario Bertolo	Italy	France – Centre-Midi	77	
143	Emmanuel Busto	France	France – Centre-Midi	31	
144	Claude Colette	France	France – Centre-Midi	DNF	
145	Jean Dotto	France	France – Centre-Midi	DNF	
146	Georges Gay	France	France – Centre-Midi	DNF	
147	Raphaël Géminiani	France	France – Centre-Midi	3	
148	Jean Graczyk	France	France – Centre-Midi	14	
149	Pierre Polo	France	France – Centre-Midi	39	
150	Marcel Rohrbach	France	France – Centre-Midi	26	
151	Antonin Rolland	France	France – Centre-Midi	66	
152	Roger Chaussabel	France	France – Centre-Midi	70	
161	Jean Bourlès	France	France – West/South-West	DNF	
162	Jean Gainche	France	France – West/South-West	29	
163	Maurice Lavigne	France	France – West/South-West	DNF	
164	Camille Le Menn	France	France – West/South-West	54	
165	Eugène Letendre	France	France – West/South-West	DNF	
166	Jean Malléjac	France	France – West/South-West	DNF	
167	Robert Roudaut	France	France – West/South-West	DNF	
168	Joseph Morvan	France	France – West/South-West	35	
169	Fernand Picot	France	France – West/South-West	49	
170	Tino Sabbadini	France	France – West/South-West	53	
171	Joseph Thomin	France	France – West/South-West	18	
172	Robert Varnajo	France	France – West/South-West	DNF	
181	Jean-Claude Annaert	France	France – Paris/North-East	23	
182	Claude Barmier	France	France – Paris/North-East	DNF	
183	Nicolas Barone	France	France – Paris/North-East	DNF	
184	Stanislas Bober	France	France – Paris/North-East	73	
185	Jean Dacquay	France	France – Paris/North-East	DNF	
186	Serge David	France	France – Paris/North-East	51	
187	Édouard Delberghe	France	France – Paris/North-East	13	
188	André Dupré	France	France – Paris/North-East	DNF	
189	Raymond Hoorelbeke	France	France – Paris/North-East	57	
190	Fernand Lamy	France	France – Paris/North-East	40	
191	Maurice Moucheraud	France	France – Paris/North-East	DNF	
192	Maurice Quentin	France	France – Paris/North-East	DNF	
