= 1957 Vuelta a España, Stage 9 to Stage 16 =

Cycling race stages

The 1957 Vuelta a España was the 12th edition of Vuelta a España, one of cycling's Grand Tours. The Tour began in Bilbao on 26 April and Stage 9 occurred on 5 May with a stage from Cuenca. The race finished in Bilbao on 12 May.

== Stage 9 ==
5 May 1957 - Cuenca to Valencia, 249 km (154.7 mi)

Route:

Stage 9 result

Rank	Rider	Team	Time
1	Rino Benedetti (ITA)	Italy	6h 55' 44"
2	Roger Baens (BEL)	Belgium	s.t.
3	Jean Malléjac (FRA)	France	s.t.
4	Alberto Sant (ESP)	Pyrenees	s.t.
5	Hortensio Vidaurreta (ESP)	Cantabria	s.t.
6	Benigno Aspuru (ESP)	Cantabria	s.t.
7	Juan Escolà (ESP)	Pyrenees	s.t.
8	Juan Campillo (ESP)	Pyrenees	s.t.
9	Gianni Ferlenghi (ITA)	Italy	+ 1' 06"
10	Mario Baroni (ITA)	Italy	+ 4' 14"

General classification after Stage 9

Rank	Rider	Team	Time
1	Federico Bahamontes (ESP)	Spain	45h 56' 36"
2	Francisco Moreno (ESP)	Central-South	+ 2' 06"
3	Carmelo Morales (ESP)	Cantabria	+ 10' 15"
4	Jan Adriaensens (BEL)	Belgium	+ 10' 50"
5	Raphaël Géminiani (FRA)	France	+ 11' 08"
6	Roger Walkowiak (FRA)	France	+ 11' 32"
7	Salvador Botella (ESP)	Spain	+ 13' 17"
8	Vicente Iturat (ESP)	Pyrenees	+ 14' 17"
9	Alberto Sant (ESP)	Pyrenees	+ 14' 31"
10	Pasquale Fornara (ITA)	Italy	+ 15' 15"

== Stage 10 ==
6 May 1957 - Valencia to Tortosa, 192 km (119.3 mi)

Route:

Stage 10 result

Rank	Rider	Team	Time
1	Bruno Tognaccini (ITA)	Italy	4h 15' 10"
2	Bernardo Ruiz (ESP)	Mediterranean	s.t.
3	Juan Escolà (ESP)	Pyrenees	s.t.
4	Jesús Loroño (ESP)	Spain	s.t.
5	Alves Barbosa (POR)	Portugal	s.t.
6	Juan Campillo (ESP)	Pyrenees	s.t.
7	José Manuel Ribeiro da Silva (POR)	Portugal	s.t.
8	Francisco Masip (ESP)	Pyrenees	+ 21' 59"
9	Vicente Iturat (ESP)	Pyrenees	s.t.
10	Gastone Nencini (ITA)	Italy	s.t.

General classification after Stage 10

Rank	Rider	Team	Time
1	Jesús Loroño (ESP)	Spain	50h 27' 40"
2	Bernardo Ruiz (ESP)	Mediterranean	+ 3"
3	Federico Bahamontes (ESP)	Spain	+ 6' 05"
4	Alves Barbosa (POR)	Portugal	+ 7' 12"
5	Francisco Moreno (ESP)	Central-South	+ 7' 51"
6	José Manuel Ribeiro da Silva (POR)	Portugal	+ 8' 43"
7	Carmelo Morales (ESP)	Cantabria	+ 16' 55"
8	Jan Adriaensens (BEL)	Belgium	s.t.
9	Raphaël Géminiani (FRA)	France	+ 17' 13"
10	Roger Walkowiak (FRA)	France	+ 17' 37"

== Stage 11 ==
7 May 1957 - Tortosa to Barcelona, 199 km (123.7 mi)

Route:

Stage 11 result

Rank	Rider	Team	Time
1	Gilbert Bauvin (FRA)	France	5h 12' 19"
2	André Rosseel (BEL)	Belgium	s.t.
3	Vicente Iturat (ESP)	Pyrenees	s.t.
4	Pasquale Fornara (ITA)	Italy	s.t.
5	Antonio Suárez (ESP)	Central-South	s.t.
6	Jesús Loroño (ESP)	Spain	s.t.
7	Federico Bahamontes (ESP)	Spain	s.t.
8	Antonio Ferraz (ESP)	Spain	+ 17"
9	Francisco Masip (ESP)	Pyrenees	s.t.
10	Roger Walkowiak (FRA)	France	s.t.

General classification after Stage 11

Rank	Rider	Team	Time
1	Jesús Loroño (ESP)	Spain	55h 39' 59"
2	Bernardo Ruiz (ESP)	Mediterranean	+ 31"
3	Federico Bahamontes (ESP)	Spain	+ 6' 05"
4	Alves Barbosa (POR)	Portugal	+ 7' 40"
5	Francisco Moreno (ESP)	Central-South	+ 8' 39"
6	José Manuel Ribeiro da Silva (POR)	Portugal	+ 9' 11"
7	Jan Adriaensens (BEL)	Belgium	+ 17' 23"
8	Raphaël Géminiani (FRA)	France	+ 17' 40"
9	Roger Walkowiak (FRA)	France	+ 17' 54"
10	Salvador Botella (ESP)	Spain	+ 19' 50"

== Stage 12 ==
8 May 1957 - Igualada to Zaragoza, 229 km (142.3 mi)

Route:

Stage 12 result

Rank	Rider	Team	Time
1	Mario Baroni (ITA)	Italy	6h 53' 39"
2	Alberto Sant (ESP)	Pyrenees	s.t.
3	Gianni Ferlenghi (ITA)	Italy	+ 5' 41"
4	Gastone Nencini (ITA)	Italy	+ 7' 28"
5	André Rosseel (BEL)	Belgium	s.t.
6	Jean Malléjac (FRA)	France	s.t.
7	Adolfo Cruz (ESP)	Cantabria	s.t.
8	Benigno Aspuru (ESP)	Cantabria	+ 8' 30"
9	Antonio Suárez (ESP)	Central-South	+ 8' 38"
10	Antonio Ferraz (ESP)	Spain	s.t.

General classification after Stage 12

Rank	Rider	Team	Time
1	Jesús Loroño (ESP)	Spain	62h 42' 16"
2	Bernardo Ruiz (ESP)	Mediterranean	+ 31"
3	Federico Bahamontes (ESP)	Spain	+ 6' 05"
4	Francisco Moreno (ESP)	Central-South	+ 8' 39"
5	José Manuel Ribeiro da Silva (POR)	Portugal	+ 9' 11"
6	Alberto Sant (ESP)	Pyrenees	+ 11' 56"
7	Jan Adriaensens (BEL)	Belgium	+ 17' 23"
8	Raphaël Géminiani (FRA)	France	+ 17' 41"
9	Roger Walkowiak (FRA)	France	+ 18' 24"
10	Salvador Botella (ESP)	Spain	+ 19' 50"

== Stage 13 ==
9 May 1957 - Zaragoza to Huesca, 85 km (53 mi) (ITT)

Route:

Stage 13 result

Rank	Rider	Team	Time
1	Jesús Loroño (ESP)	Spain	2h 13' 24"
2	Raphaël Géminiani (FRA)	France	+ 54"
3	Federico Bahamontes (ESP)	Spain	+ 1' 06"
4	Jan Adriaensens (BEL)	Belgium	+ 1' 15"
5	Guido Boni (ITA)	Italy	+ 1' 22"
6	Pasquale Fornara (ITA)	Italy	+ 1' 28"
7	Gastone Nencini (ITA)	Italy	+ 4' 06"
8	Andrés Trobat (ESP)	Spain	+ 4' 15"
9	Roger Baens (BEL)	Belgium	+ 5' 16"
10	Antonio Suárez (ESP)	Central-South	+ 5' 26"

General classification after Stage 13

Rank	Rider	Team	Time
1	Jesús Loroño (ESP)	Spain	64h 54' 40"
2	Federico Bahamontes (ESP)	Spain	+ 8' 11"
3	Bernardo Ruiz (ESP)	Mediterranean	+ 9' 34"
4	Francisco Moreno (ESP)	Central-South	+ 18' 43"
5	Raphaël Géminiani (FRA)	France	+ 19' 05"
6	Jan Adriaensens (BEL)	Belgium	+ 19' 38"
7	José Manuel Ribeiro da Silva (POR)	Portugal	+ 19' 47"
8	Pasquale Fornara (ITA)	Italy	+ 23' 48"
9	Alberto Sant (ESP)	Pyrenees	+ 25' 26"
10	Gastone Nencini (ITA)	Italy	+ 25' 59"

== Stage 14 ==
10 May 1957 - Huesca to Bayonne, 249 km (155 mi)

Route:

Stage 14 result

Rank	Rider	Team	Time
1	Antonio Ferraz (ESP)	Spain	7h 25' 30"
2	José Manuel Ribeiro da Silva (POR)	Portugal	s.t.
3	Benigno Aspuru (ESP)	Cantabria	s.t.
4	Emiel Van Cauter (BEL)	Belgium	+ 2' 47"
5	Raphaël Géminiani (FRA)	France	s.t.
6	André Rosseel (BEL)	Belgium	+ 3' 29"
7	Rino Benedetti (ITA)	Italy	+ 4' 45"
8	Adolphe Deledda (FRA)	France	s.t.
9	Gastone Nencini (ITA)	Italy	s.t.
10	Vicente Iturat (ESP)	Pyrenees	s.t.

General classification after Stage 14

Rank	Rider	Team	Time
1	Jesús Loroño (ESP)	Spain	72h 24' 55"
2	Federico Bahamontes (ESP)	Spain	+ 8' 10"
3	Bernardo Ruiz (ESP)	Mediterranean	+ 9' 34"
4	José Manuel Ribeiro da Silva (POR)	Portugal	+ 14' 32"
5	Raphaël Géminiani (FRA)	France	+ 17' 07"
6	Francisco Moreno (ESP)	Central-South	+ 18' 43"
7	Jan Adriaensens (BEL)	Belgium	+ 19' 42"
8	Pasquale Fornara (ITA)	Italy	+ 23' 48"
9	Alberto Sant (ESP)	Pyrenees	+ 25' 28"
10	Gastone Nencini (ITA)	Italy	+ 25' 59"

== Stage 15 ==
11 May 1957 - Bayonne to San Sebastián, 199 km (124 mi)

Route:

Stage 15 result

Rank	Rider	Team	Time
1	Roger Baens (BEL)	Belgium	5h 55' 28"
2	Vicente Iturat (ESP)	Pyrenees	+ 4' 02"
3	Gastone Nencini (ITA)	Italy	s.t.
4	Guido Boni (ITA)	Italy	s.t.
5	Antonio Suárez (ESP)	Central-South	s.t.
6	André Rosseel (BEL)	Belgium	s.t.
7	Jan Adriaensens (BEL)	Belgium	s.t.
8	José Michelena (ESP)	Cantabria	s.t.
9	Francisco Masip (ESP)	Pyrenees	s.t.
10	Salvador Barrutia (ESP)	Spain	s.t.

General classification after Stage 15

Rank	Rider	Team	Time
1	Jesús Loroño (ESP)	Spain	78h 25' 25"
2	Federico Bahamontes (ESP)	Spain	+ 7' 11"
3	Bernardo Ruiz (ESP)	Mediterranean	+ 8' 34"
4	José Manuel Ribeiro da Silva (POR)	Portugal	+ 13' 32"
5	Raphaël Géminiani (FRA)	France	+ 16' 07"
6	Francisco Moreno (ESP)	Central-South	+ 17' 43"
7	Jan Adriaensens (BEL)	Belgium	+ 18' 42"
8	Pasquale Fornara (ITA)	Italy	+ 22' 48"
9	Alberto Sant (ESP)	Pyrenees	+ 24' 28"
10	Gastone Nencini (ITA)	Italy	+ 24' 59"

== Stage 16 ==
12 May 1957 - San Sebastián to Bilbao, 193 km (120 mi)

Route:

Stage 16 result

Rank	Rider	Team	Time
1	Antonio Suárez (ESP)	Central-South	6h 12' 58"
2	José Gómez del Moral (ESP)	Central-South	+ 4' 47"
3	Manuel Rodriguez (ESP)	Cantabria	s.t.
4	Benigno Aspuru (ESP)	Cantabria	+ 6' 38"
5	Vicente Iturat (ESP)	Pyrenees	+ 6' 43"
6	Gastone Nencini (ITA)	Italy	s.t.
7	Guido Boni (ITA)	Italy	s.t.
8	Federico Bahamontes (ESP)	Spain	s.t.
9	José Michelena (ESP)	Cantabria	s.t.
10	Francisco Masip (ESP)	Pyrenees	s.t.

General classification after Stage 16

Rank	Rider	Team	Time
1	Jesús Loroño (ESP)	Spain	84h 44' 06"
2	Federico Bahamontes (ESP)	Spain	+ 8' 11"
3	Bernardo Ruiz (ESP)	Mediterranean	+ 9' 34"
4	José Manuel Ribeiro da Silva (POR)	Portugal	+ 14' 32"
5	Raphaël Géminiani (FRA)	France	+ 17' 07"
6	Francisco Moreno (ESP)	Central-South	+ 18' 43"
7	Jan Adriaensens (BEL)	Belgium	+ 19' 38"
8	Pasquale Fornara (ITA)	Italy	+ 23' 48"
9	Gastone Nencini (ITA)	Italy	+ 25' 59"
10	Salvador Botella (ESP)	Spain	+ 27' 06"
