= 1957 Vuelta a España, Stage 1 to Stage 8 =

Cycling race stages

The 1957 Vuelta a España was the 12th edition of Vuelta a España, one of cycling's Grand Tours. The Tour began in Bilbao on 26 April and Stage 8 occurred on 3 May with a stage to Cuenca. The race finished in Bilbao on 12 May.

== Stage 1 ==
26 April 1957 - Bilbao to Vitoria, 158 km (98.2 mi)

Route:

Stage 1 result and general classification after Stage 1

Rank	Rider	Team	Time
1	Miguel Chacón (ESP)	Pyrenees	4h 28' 13"
2	Carmelo Morales (ESP)	Cantabria	+ 30"
3	Jesús Loroño (ESP)	Spain	+ 1' 00"
4	Alves Barbosa (POR)	Portugal	+ 2' 10"
5	Raphaël Géminiani (FRA)	France	s.t.
6	Vicente Iturat (ESP)	Pyrenees	+ 3' 07"
7	Bernardo Ruiz (ESP)	Mediterranean	s.t.
8	Gilbert Bauvin (FRA)	France	s.t.
9	Salvador Barrutia (ESP)	Spain	s.t.
10	Jan Adriaensens (BEL)	Belgium	s.t.

== Stage 2 ==
27 April 1957 - Vitoria to Santander, 220 km (136.7 mi)

Route:

Stage 2 result

Rank	Rider	Team	Time
1	Carmelo Morales (ESP)	Cantabria	6h 55' 18"
2	Benigno Aspuru (ESP)	Cantabria	+ 1' 25"
3	Jean Dotto (FRA)	France	s.t.
4	Hortensio Vidaurreta (ESP)	Cantabria	+ 1' 40"
5	Vicente Iturat (ESP)	Pyrenees	+ 1' 41"
6	Guido Boni (ITA)	Italy	s.t.
7	Raphaël Géminiani (FRA)	France	s.t.
8	Lucien De Munster (BEL)	Belgium	s.t.
9	Roger Wyckstand (BEL)	Belgium	s.t.
10	Federico Bahamontes (ESP)	Spain	s.t.

General classification after Stage 2

Rank	Rider	Team	Time
1	Carmelo Morales (ESP)	Cantabria	11h 23' 01"
2	Miguel Chacón (ESP)	Pyrenees	+ 2' 11"
3	Jesús Loroño (ESP)	Spain	+ 3' 11"
4	Raphaël Géminiani (FRA)	France	+ 4' 25"
5	Benigno Aspuru (ESP)	Cantabria	+ 4' 37"
6	Jean Dotto (FRA)	France	+ 5' 02"
7	Hortensio Vidaurreta (ESP)	Cantabria	+ 5' 17"
8	Gilbert Bauvin (FRA)	France	+ 5' 18"
9	Gastone Nencini (ITA)	Italy	s.t.
10	Manuel Rodriguez (ESP)	Cantabria	s.t.

== Stage 3 ==
28 April 1957 - Santander to Mieres, 259 km (161 mi)

Route:

Stage 3 result

Rank	Rider	Team	Time
1	Federico Bahamontes (ESP)	Spain	7h 36' 29"
2	Francisco Moreno (ESP)	Central-South	+ 1' 04"
3	Salvador Botella (ESP)	Spain	s.t.
4	Miguel Pacheco (ESP)	Pyrenees	s.t.
5	Alberto Sant (ESP)	Pyrenees	+ 7' 47"
6	Gianni Ferlenghi (ITA)	Italy	+ 8' 12"
7	Julio San Emeterio (ESP)	Spain	+ 8' 33"
8	Adolfo Cruz (ESP)	Cantabria	+ 9' 38"
9	Roger Wyckstand (BEL)	Belgium	+ 9' 47"
10	Benigno Aspuru (ESP)	Cantabria	+ 10' 11"

General classification after Stage 3

Rank	Rider	Team	Time
1	Federico Bahamontes (ESP)	Spain	19h 03' 48"
2	Francisco Moreno (ESP)	Central-South	+ 1' 34"
3	Salvador Botella (ESP)	Spain	+ 4' 47"
4	Miguel Pacheco (ESP)	Pyrenees	+ 9' 01"
5	Carmelo Morales (ESP)	Cantabria	+ 9' 43"
6	Benigno Aspuru (ESP)	Cantabria	+ 10' 25"
7	Alberto Sant (ESP)	Pyrenees	+ 11' 14"
8	Miguel Chacón (ESP)	Pyrenees	+ 11' 54"
9	José Michelena (ESP)	Cantabria	+ 12' 12"
10	Jesús Loroño (ESP)	Spain	+ 12' 54"

== Stage 4 ==
29 April 1957 - Mieres to León

Route:

Stage annulled.

== Stage 5 ==
30 April 1957 - León to Valladolid, 172 km (107 mi)

Route:

Stage 5 result

Rank	Rider	Team	Time
1	Roger Hassenforder (FRA)	France	4h 15' 28"
2	Roger Walkowiak (FRA)	France	s.t.
3	Emiel Van Cauter (BEL)	Belgium	s.t.
4	Juan Crespo (ESP)	Pyrenees	+ 19"
5	André Rosseel (BEL)	Belgium	+ 52"
6	Bruno Tognaccini (ITA)	Italy	s.t.
7	Rino Benedetti (ITA)	Italy	s.t.
8	Gilbert Bauvin (FRA)	France	s.t.
9	Jan Adriaensens (BEL)	Belgium	s.t.
10	Gastone Nencini (ITA)	Italy	s.t.

General classification after Stage 5

Rank	Rider	Team	Time
1	Federico Bahamontes (ESP)	Spain	23h 20' 18"
2	Francisco Moreno (ESP)	Central-South	+ 1' 34"
3	Salvador Botella (ESP)	Spain	+ 4' 47"
4	Miguel Pacheco (ESP)	Pyrenees	+ 9' 01"
5	Carmelo Morales (ESP)	Cantabria	+ 9' 43"
6	Miguel Chacón (ESP)	Pyrenees	+ 11' 54"
7	José Michelena (ESP)	Cantabria	+ 12' 12"
8	Jesús Loroño (ESP)	Spain	+ 12' 54"
9	Vicente Iturat (ESP)	Pyrenees	+ 13' 45"
10	Raphaël Géminiani (FRA)	France	+ 14' 08"

== Stage 6 ==
1 May 1957 - Valladolid to Madrid, 212 km (132 mi)

Route:

Stage 6 result

Rank	Rider	Team	Time
1	Miguel Chacón (ESP)	Pyrenees	5h 32' 35"
2	Salvador Botella (ESP)	Spain	s.t.
3	Pasquale Fornara (ITA)	Italy	+ 7"
4	Roger Baens (BEL)	Belgium	+ 22"
5	Gianni Ferlenghi (ITA)	Italy	s.t.
6	Renzo Accordi (ITA)	Italy	s.t.
7	Camille Huyghe (FRA)	France	+ 48"
8	Alves Barbosa (POR)	Portugal	+ 5' 28"
9	Francisco Masip (ESP)	Pyrenees	s.t.
10	Vicente Iturat (ESP)	Pyrenees	+ 6' 09"

General classification after Stage 6

Rank	Rider	Team	Time
1	Salvador Botella (ESP)	Spain	28h 57' 14"
2	Federico Bahamontes (ESP)	Spain	+ 1' 48"
3	Francisco Moreno (ESP)	Central-South	+ 3' 22"
4	Miguel Chacón (ESP)	Pyrenees	+ 6' 29"
5	Carmelo Morales (ESP)	Cantabria	+ 11' 31"
6	Jesús Loroño (ESP)	Spain	+ 14' 42"
7	Miguel Pacheco (ESP)	Pyrenees	+ 14' 53"
8	Vicente Iturat (ESP)	Pyrenees	+ 15' 33"
9	Raphaël Géminiani (FRA)	France	+ 15' 54"
10	Roger Wyckstand (BEL)	Belgium	+ 16' 24"

== Stage 7 ==
2 May 1957 - Madrid to Madrid, 200 km (120 mi)

Route:

Stage 7 result

Rank	Rider	Team	Time
1	Jan Adriaensens (BEL)	Belgium	5h 18' 22"
2	Benigno Aspuru (ESP)	Cantabria	+ 9"
3	Vicente Iturat (ESP)	Pyrenees	+ 11"
4	Pasquale Fornara (ITA)	Italy	s.t.
5	Antonio Suárez (ESP)	Central-South	s.t.
6	Gastone Nencini (ITA)	Italy	s.t.
7	Raphaël Géminiani (FRA)	France	s.t.
8	Roger Walkowiak (FRA)	France	s.t.
9	Antonio Karmany (ESP)	Mediterranean	s.t.
10	Carmelo Morales (ESP)	Cantabria	s.t.

General classification after Stage 7

Rank	Rider	Team	Time
1	Francisco Moreno (ESP)	Central-South	34h 19' 09"
2	Federico Bahamontes (ESP)	Spain	+ 54"
3	Carmelo Morales (ESP)	Cantabria	+ 8' 09"
4	Salvador Botella (ESP)	Spain	+ 9' 46"
5	Vicente Iturat (ESP)	Pyrenees	+ 12' 11"
6	Jan Adriaensens (BEL)	Belgium	+ 12' 16"
7	Raphaël Géminiani (FRA)	France	+ 12' 34"
8	Pasquale Fornara (ITA)	Italy	+ 13' 09"
9	Gastone Nencini (ITA)	Italy	+ 13' 22"
10	Jesús Loroño (ESP)	Spain	+ 13' 48"

== Stage 8 ==
3 May 1957 - Madrid to Cuenca, 159 km (99 mi)

Route:

Stage 8 result

Rank	Rider	Team	Time
1	Roger Walkowiak (FRA)	France	4h 26' 03"
2	Gilbert Bauvin (FRA)	France	s.t.
3	Alves Barbosa (POR)	Portugal	s.t.
4	Jan Adriaensens (BEL)	Belgium	s.t.
5	Francisco Masip (ESP)	Pyrenees	s.t.
6	Guido Boni (ITA)	Italy	s.t.
7	Raphaël Géminiani (FRA)	France	s.t.
8	Jean Dotto (FRA)	France	s.t.
9	Federico Bahamontes (ESP)	Spain	s.t.
10	Mario Baroni (ITA)	Italy	+ 32"

General classification after Stage 8

Rank	Rider	Team	Time
1	Federico Bahamontes (ESP)	Spain	38h 46' 38"
2	Francisco Moreno (ESP)	Central-South	+ 2' 56"
3	Carmelo Morales (ESP)	Cantabria	+ 10' 15"
4	Jan Adriaensens (BEL)	Belgium	+ 10' 50"
5	Raphaël Géminiani (FRA)	France	+ 11' 08"
6	Roger Walkowiak (FRA)	France	+ 11' 32"
7	Salvador Botella (ESP)	Spain	+ 13' 17"
8	Vicente Iturat (ESP)	Pyrenees	+ 14' 17"
9	Pasquale Fornara (ITA)	Italy	+ 15' 15"
10	Gastone Nencini (ITA)	Italy	+ 15' 28"
