= Trofeo Jaumendreu =

Cycling race in Spain

Race details
- Region: Catalonia, Spain
- Discipline: Road race
- Type: One-day race

History
- First edition: 1945
- Editions: 24
- Final edition: 1969
- First winner: Miguel Poblet (ESP)
- Most wins: Francisco Masip (ESP); Miguel Poblet (ESP) (2 wins)
- Final winner: Dino Zandegù (ITA)

The Trofeo Jaumendreu was a road bicycle race held annually in Catalonia, Spain from 1945 until 1969. From 1963 to 1969, the race took place as a stage in the Setmana Catalana de Ciclisme.

== Winners ==
Year	Winner	Second	Third
1945	(Spain) Miguel Poblet	(Spain) Antonio Martín Eguia	(Spain) Francisco Masip
1946	(Spain) Bernardo Ruiz	(Spain) Antonio Gelabert	(Spain) Miguel Gual
1947	(Spain) Miguel Poblet	(Spain) Bernardo Ruiz	(Spain) Bernardo Capó
1948	(Spain) Francisco Masip	(Spain) Miguel Poblet	(Spain) Vicente Torrella
1949	(Spain) Antonio Gelabert	(Spain) Bernardo Capó	(Spain) Artur Dorsé
1950	(Spain) Francisco Masip	(Spain) Joaquín Filba	(Spain) Sergio Celebrowski
1951	(Spain) Mariano Corrales	(Spain) Joan Crespo Hita	(Spain) Miguel Chacón
1952	(Spain) Francisco Tarragona	(Spain) Angel Paris	(Spain) Santiago Mostajo Gutiérrez
1953	(Spain) José Segú	(Spain) Federico Martín Bahamontes	(Spain) Jaime Calucho
1954	(Spain) Aniceto Utset	(Spain) José Segú	(Spain) Santiago Mostajo Gutiérrez
1955	(Spain) Salvador Botella	(Spain) Santiago Mostajo Gutiérrez	(Spain) Alfred Esmatges
1956	(Spain) Miguel Bover	(Spain) Salvador Botella	(Spain) Gabriel Company Bauzà
1957	(Spain) Antonio Ferraz	(Spain) Miguel Bover	(Spain) Jesús Galdeano
1958	No race		
1959	(Spain) Juan Campillo	(Spain) Fernando Mitjà	(Spain) José Carlos Sánchez
1960	(Spain) Antonio Bertrán	(Spain) José Pérez Francés	(Spain) Joan Escolà
1961	(Spain) José Martín Quesada	(Spain) Antonio Gómez del Moral	(Spain) Juan Belmonte
1962	(Spain) Salvador Rosa	(Spain) Luis Mayoral	(Spain) Ángel Ibáñez
1963	(Spain) Fernando Manzaneque	(Spain) Antonio Suárez	(Spain) José Pérez Francés
1964	(France) Joseph Novales	(Spain) Gabriel Mas	(Spain) Manuel Martín Piñera
1965	(Spain) Gregorio San Miguel	(Spain) Luis Otaño	(Spain) Juan José Sagarduy
1966	(Spain) Antonio Gómez del Moral	(Spain) José Antonio Momeñe	(Spain) José Manuel López Rodríguez
1967	(Spain) José Pérez Francés	(Spain) Domingo Perurena Telletxea	(Spain) Jaime Alomar
1968	(France) Paul Lemeteyer	(France) Serge Bolley	(Spain) José Goyeneche
1969	(Italy) Dino Zandegù	(Belgium) Guido Reybrouck	(Belgium) Georges Vandenberghe
