= Joaquín Filba =

Spanish cyclist

Personal information
- Full name: Joaquín Filba Pascual
- Born: 1 January 1923 Sant Antoni de Vilamajor, Catalonia, Spain
- Died: 15 August 2012 (aged 89) Sant Antoni de Vilamajor, Catalonia, Spain

Cycling career
- Sport: Cycling
- Disciplines: Road; Cyclo-cross
- Role: Rider

Professional teams
- 1945–1951: Individual
- 1952: C.C Barcelona–Conservas, Puig
- 1953: Individual
- 1954: Peña Solera-Cacaolat
- 1955: Mariotas

Joaquín Filba (1 January 1923 – 15 August 2012) was a Spanish cyclist, who was professional between 1945 and 1955. From 1945 to 1951 he competed as an individual. Filba notably won the 1949 Vuelta a Levante, and also finished fifth at the world cyclo-cross championships in 1953.

== Biography ==
Joaquín Filba was born in Sant Antoni de Vilamajor, Catalonia on January 1, 1923 and died in Sant Antoni de Vilamajor in 2012 at the age of 89. Filba finished 2nd in the 1953 and 3rd in the 1947 editions of the Gran Premio de Catalunya, and won a stage in 1950. He was also the team director of the Moià Cycling Association. Filba competed in the 1947 and 1955 Vuelta a España.

== Major results ==
1945
8th Overall Volta a Catalunya
1946
9th Trofeo Jaumendreu
1947
3rd Overall Gran Premio de Cataluña
4th Overall Volta a Catalunya
1948
1st Circuito Ribera Jalon
3rd Subida a Arrate
4th Overall Gran Premio de Cataluña
1949
1st Overall Vuelta a Levante

1st Stages 1, 2 4b & 5

1st Road race, Barcelona Road Championships
6th Trofeo Jaumendreu
1950
1st Stages 3b & 5 Gran Premio de Cataluña
2nd Trofeo Jaumendreu
6th Trofeo Masferrer
1951
10th Overall Volta a Catalunya
1952
7th Overall Gran Premio de Cataluña

1st Stage 2 (ITT)

1953
2nd Overall Gran Premio Cataluña
10th Overall Volta a Catalunya

=== Vuelta a España results ===
- 1947: DNF
- 1955: 45th

=== Cyclo-Cross results ===
- 1947–1948:3rd
- 1952–1953:2nd
- 1953:5th
