= Santiago Mostajo Gutiérrez =

Spanish cyclist

Santiago Mostajo
Personal information
- Full name: Santiago Mostajo Gutiérrez
- Born: 15 September 1932 Zaragoza, Spain
- Died: 11 January 2005 (aged 72) Barcelona, Spain

Cycling career
- Sport: Cycling
- Discipline: Road bicycle racing
- Role: Rider

Professional teams
- 1952–1953: Individual
- 1954: Barcelones CC y Splendid
- 1955–1956: Individual
- 1957-1958: Faema
- 1959: Individual
- 1960: Catigene
- 1960–1961: Lambretta-Mostajo

Major wins
- 1st stages in the Volta a Catalunya

Santiago Mostajo Gutiérrez (15 September 1932 – 11 January 2005) was a Spanish professional cyclist. His best result was a stage in at the 1957 Volta a Catalunya, when he arrived alone in Granollers. At the end of the 1950s, he acquired Campo del Guinardó and rebuilt the race track around the playing field.

== Biography ==
Santiago was born in Zaragoza, Spain on September 15, 1932. His father Santiago Mostajo Trigo was also a professional cyclist. He competed with the Faema-Guerra team during 1950s and won the Borràs Trophy in 1953 and one stage of the Volta a Catalunya in 1957. He collaborated with his father on the management of the Mostajo velodrome at the Camp del Guinardó in Barcelona, where a cycling school was set up. In 1978 he was proclaimed runner-up in the masters world championship.

== Major results ==
1952
National Track Championships

1st Sprint
1st Points race

3rd Trofeo Jaumendreu
1953
1st Trofeo Borràs
1956
1st Stage 1 Vuelta a Mallorca
1957
1st Stage 7 Volta a Catalunya
