= 1955 Volta a Catalunya =

Race details
- Dates: 3–11 September 1955
- Stages: 9
- Distance: 1,447 km (899.1 mi)
- Winning time: 39h 52' 59"

Results
Jersey awarded to the overall winner	Winner	José Gómez del Moral (ESP)
	Second	Gabriel Company (ESP)
	Third	Emilio Rodríguez (ESP)

The 1955 Volta a Catalunya was the 35th edition of the Volta a Catalunya cycle race and was held from 3 September to 11 September 1955. The race started in Sabadell and finished in Barcelona. The race was won by José Gómez del Moral.

== General classification ==
Final general classification

Rank	Rider	Time
1	José Gómez del Moral (ESP)	39h 52' 59"
2	Gabriel Company (ESP)	+ 11' 03"
3	Emilio Rodríguez (ESP)	+ 13' 14"
4	André Brulé (FRA)	+ 18' 49"
5	Federico Bahamontes (ESP)	+ 19' 47"
6	Antonio Jiménez Quiles (ESP)	+ 23' 16"
7	Francisco Moreno (ESP)	+ 24' 39"
8	Walter Serena (ITA)	+ 25' 06"
9	Bernardo Ruiz (ESP)	+ 27' 43"
10	Juan Crespo Hita (ESP)	+ 27' 54"
