= 1956 Volta a Catalunya =

Race details
- Dates: 2–9 September 1956
- Stages: 9
- Distance: 1,421 km (883.0 mi)
- Winning time: 39h 24' 35"

Results
Jersey awarded to the overall winner	Winner	Aniceto Utset (ESP)
	Second	Vicente Iturat (ESP)
	Third	Francisco Masip (ESP)

The 1956 Volta a Catalunya was the 36th edition of the Volta a Catalunya cycle race and was held from 6 September to 13 September 1956. The race started in Sabadell and finished in Barcelona. The race was won by Aniceto Utset.

== General classification ==
Final general classification

Rank	Rider	Time
1	Aniceto Utset (ESP)	39h 24' 35"
2	Vicente Iturat (ESP)	+ 15"
3	Francisco Masip (ESP)	+ 2' 44"
4	Miguel Poblet (ESP)	+ 4' 15"
5	Antonio Gelabert (ESP)	+ 4' 20"
6	Juan Crespo Hita (ESP)	+ 5' 16"
7	Juan Escolà (ESP)	+ 6' 30"
8	Walter Serena (ITA)	+ 7' 53"
9	Jaime Calucho Mestres (ESP)	+ 9' 17"
10	José Escolano (ESP)	+ 9' 20"
