= José Martín Quesada =

Spanish cyclist

Personal information
- Full name: José Martin Quesada Nortes
- Born: 26 May 1935 Elche, Valenciana, Spain
- Died: 18 June 1996 (aged 61) Elche, Valenciana, Spain

Cycling career
- Sport: Cycling
- Discipline: Road
- Role: Rider

Professional teams
- 1957: B. Ruiz–Orihuela
- 1958–1960: Onafhankelijke–C.C. Barcelones
- 1961: C.C. Barcelones-E.M.I.
- 1961: Faema
- 1962: Aguila–Denia
- 1963: Faema–Flandria
- 1964: Certina
- 1964: Inuri
- 1964: Licor 43
- 1965–1966: Ferrys

José Martin Quesada Nortes (26 May 1935 – 18 June 1996) was a Spanish professional cyclist, who was professional between 1957 and 1966. José Martin notably play a stage of the Vuelta a Levante and Vuelta a Andalucía. He retired from cycling at the end of the 1966 season.

== Biography ==
José Martin was born in Elche on 26 May 1935 and died in Elche, Valenciana at the age of 61. He finished 7th in the general classification of the 1961 Vuelta a Andalucía road race, and he also finished 6th general classification of the 1963 Vuelta a Andalucía road race.

== Career ==
José Martin turned professional with the C.C. Barcelones team. His cycling career spanned 13 seasons. José Martin competed in the Tour de l'Avenir road race. His main victory was the Trofeo Masferrer in 1961. José Martin last play was the Vuelta a Andalucía in 1966. He finished 5th in the 1963 editions of the gran premio fedrácion catalana de ciclismo.

== Major results ==
1961
1st Trofeo Jaumendreu
7th Vuelta a Andalucía
1963
7th Vuelta a Andalucía
2nd Stage 1 Vuelta a Levante
4th Stage 3 Vuelta a Levante
8th Vuelta a Levante
3rd Vuelta a Levante
5th Gran Premio Fedrácion Catalana de Ciclismo - Trofeo Club Drink
5th Stage 14 Tour de l'Avenir
2nd Stage 7 Volta a Catalunya
1950
3rd Trofeo Jaumendreu
1966
2nd Stage 4 Vuelta a Andalucía
3rd Stage 8 Vuelta a Andalucía
