= Aniceto Utset =

Spanish cyclist

Personal information
- Born: 17 January 1932 Terrassa, Catalonia, Spain
- Died: 11 November 1998 (aged 66) Terrassa, Catalonia, Spain

Cycling career
- Sport: Cycling
- Discipline: Road
- Role: Rider

Professional teams
- 1954–1955: Peña Nicky's
- 1956–1957: Mobylette
- 1958: Ignis–Doniselli
- 1959: Licor 43
- 1959: Faema–Guerra
- 1960: Kas
- 1961: Catigene

Major wins
- Volta a Catalunya (1956)

Aniceto Utset (17 January 1932 – 11 November 1998) was a Spanish professional cyclist, who was professional between from 1954 to 1961. He retired from cycling at the end of the 1961 season. He was third in the Spanish climbing championship in 1957 and made his debut in the Vuelta a España in 1958.

== Biography ==
Aniceto Utset was born in Terrassa, Catalonia on January 1, 1932, and died in Terrassa, Catalonia at the age of 66. He finished 1st in the general classification of the 1956 Volta a Catalunya road race, and he also finished 3rd general classification of the 1958 Volta a Catalunya road race. He won the Trofeo Jaumendreu trophy in 1954.

== Career ==
Aniceto Utset turned professional with the Mobylette team. His cycling career spanned 8 seasons. He competed as a professional with Peña Nicky's in 1954–1955 and mobylette 1956–1961. Utset contested the Vuelta a España from 1958 to 1961 and the 1959 Tour de France.

== Major results ==
1954
1st Trofeo Jaumendreu
3rd Trofeo Borras
1956
1st Overall Volta a Catalunya
2nd GP Martorell
7th Trofeo Jaumendreu
1957
1st Bellpuig
1st Tarrasa
3rd Montornés
1958
3rd Overall Volta a Catalunya
1959
1st Stage 5 Vuelta a Andalucía
1960
3rd GP Ayutamiento de Bilbao
3rd Trofeo Masferrer
1961
1st Stage 7 Vuelta a Andalucía
1st Gran Premio Ayuntamiento de Tarrega
3rd Montblanch

=== Grand Tour results ===
==== Tour de France ====
- 1959: DNF

==== Vuelta a España ====
- 1961: DNF
- 1958: 35
- 1961: DNF
- 1961: DNF
- 1961: 41
