= Walter Serena =

Personal information
- Born: 3 April 1928 San Zeno Naviglio, Italy
- Died: 19 August 2011 (aged 83) Brescia, Italy

Cycling career
- Sport: Cycling
- Discipline: Road
- Role: Rider

Professional teams
- 1952–1953: Welter–Ursus
- 1954: Bottecchia
- 1955–1956: Leo–Chlorodont
- 1957: Arbos Bif

Major wins
- Volta a Catalunya (1954)

Walter Serena (3 April 1928 – 19 August 2011) was an Italian cyclist, who competed as a professional from 1952 to 1957. He most notably won the 1954 Volta a Catalunya. He also competed in five editions of the Giro d'Italia.

== Major results ==
1953
6th Züri-Metzgete
9th Giro dell'Appennino
1954
1st Overall Volta a Catalunya

1st Stage 8 (ITT)

6th Coppa Sabatini
6th Giro del Veneto
7th Giro di Campania
8th Giro di Lombardia
10th Overall Tour de Suisse
1955
3rd Giro del Veneto
8th Overall Volta a Catalunya
9th Giro di Lombardia
1956
1st Stage 2b (TTT) Giro d'Italia
3rd Overall Giro di Sicilia
8th Overall Volta a Catalunya
