= 1958 Volta a Catalunya =

Race details
- Dates: 7–14 September 1958
- Stages: 8
- Distance: 1,389.4 km (863.3 mi)
- Winning time: 37h 28' 02"

Results
	Winner	Richard Van Genechten (BEL)
	Second	Gabriel Mas (ESP)
	Third	Aniceto Utset (ESP)

The 1958 Volta a Catalunya was the 38th edition of the Volta a Catalunya cycle race and was held from 7 September to 14 September 1958. The race started in Montjuïc and finished in Barcelona. The race was won by Richard Van Genechten.

== General classification ==
Final general classification

Rank	Rider	Time
1	Richard Van Genechten (BEL)	37h 28' 02"
2	Gabriel Mas (ESP)	+ 3' 52"
3	Aniceto Utset (ESP)	+ 4' 31"
4	Fernando Manzaneque (ESP)	+ 6' 53"
5	Miguel Pacheco (ESP)	+ 8' 46"
6	Joaquín Barceló Santonja (ESP)	+ 11' 35"
7	José Herrero Berrendero (ESP)	+ 17' 29"
8	Facundo Zabaleta (ESP)	+ 20' 34"
9	Antonio Suárez (ESP)	+ 21' 55"
10	René Marigil (ESP)	+ 21' 58"
