= Sergio Celebrowski =

Spanish cyclist

Personal information
- Born: 25 August 1926 Badalona, Catalonia, Spain
- Died: 9 June 2007 (aged 80) Carcassonne, France

Cycling career
- Sport: Cycling
- Discipline: Road
- Role: Rider

Professional teams
- 1948–1951: Individual
- 1952: Peugeot–Dunlop i Colomb–Dunlop
- 1953: Colomb–Manera
- 1954: Terrot–Hutchinson
- 1955: Splendid–d'Alessandro
- 1956: Individual
- 1957: Rochet–Dunlop

Major wins
- 1 stage Volta a Catalunya

Sergio Celebrowski (25 August 1926 – 9 June 2007) was a Spanish professional cyclist, who was professional between 1948 and 1957. Sergio notably won a stage of the 1951 Volta a Catalunya. Sergio was known as an attacking rider who excelled as a climber. He retired from cycling at the end of the 1957 season.

== Biography ==
Celebrowski was born in Badalona on 25 August 1926 and died in Carcassonne at the age of 80. Celebrowski was accorded the citizenship of France in 1970, and also participated in a number of cycling events for France.

== Major results ==
1949
1st Road race, National Independent Road Championships
1950
3rd Trofeo Jaumendreu
1951
1st Stage 8 Volta a Catalunya
