= Santiago Mostajo Trigo =

Spanish former cyclist

Santiago Mostajo
Personal information
- Full name: Santiago Mostajo Trigo
- Born: April 1912 Calatayud, Aragon, Spain
- Died: 29 March 1997 (aged 84) Barcelona, Spain

Cycling career
- Sport: Cycling
- Discipline: Road
- Role: Rider

Santiago Mostajo Trigo (April 1912 – 29 March 1997) was a Spanish former professional cyclist. He was professional between 1932 and 1936.

== Biography ==
Santiago was born in Calatayud, Aragon in April 1912 and died in Barcelona at the age of 84. His son Santiago Mostajo Gutiérrez was also a professional cyclist. From 1935, he raced alongside Orbea team. As a climbing specialist, Santiago achieved his highest position in the 1932 Tour when he was twenty. He had, however, already established himself as a contender for honours in other Tours. He was twentythree and a stage winner in the 1935. At the end of this season, he retired from cycling. He competed in the team Orbea event at the 1935.

== Major results ==
1941
National Championship Cyclocross
