= Ernest Ecuyer =

Swiss cyclist

Personal information
- Born: 11 May 1934
- Died: 5 October 2008 (aged 74)

Cycling career
- Sport: Cycling
- Role: Rider

Ernest Ecuyer (11 May 1934 – 5 October 2008) was a Swiss racing cyclist. He rode in the 1958 Tour de France.
