= 1955 Vuelta a España =

Race details
- Dates: 25 April – 8 May
- Stages: 15
- Distance: 2,776 km (1,725 mi)
- Winning time: 81h 04' 02"

Results
Jersey awarded to the overall winner	Winner	Jean Dotto (FRA)
	Second	Antonio Jiménez Quiles (ESP)
	Third	Raphaël Géminiani (FRA)
Jersey awarded to the points classification winner	Points	Fiorenzo Magni (ITA)
	Mountains	Giuseppe Buratti (ITA)

The 10th Vuelta a España (Tour of Spain), a long-distance bicycle stage race and one of the three grand tours, was held from 25 April to 8 May 1955. It consisted of 15 stages covering a total of 2,740 km (1,700 mi), and was won by Jean Dotto. Fiorenzo Magni won the points classification and Giuseppe Buratti won the mountains classification.

== Route ==
List of stages
Stage	Date	Course	Distance	Type	Winner
1	23 April	Bilbao to San Sebastián	240 km (149 mi)		Gilbert Bauvin (FRA)
2	24 April	San Sebastián to Bayonne (France)	211 km (131 mi)		Gilbert Bauvin (FRA)
3	25 April	Bayonne (France) to Pamplona	157 km (98 mi)		Antonio Gelabert (ESP)
4	26 April	Pamplona to Zaragoza	229 km (142 mi)		Jesús Galdeano (ESP)
5	27 April	Zaragoza to Lleida	195 km (121 mi)		Gabriel Company (ESP)
6	28 April	Lleida to Barcelona	230 km (143 mi)		Pierino Baffi (ITA)
7	30 April	Barcelona to Barcelona	29 km (18 mi)	Individual time trial	Fiorenzo Magni (ITA)
8	1 May	Barcelona to Tortosa	213 km (132 mi)		Vicente Iturat (ESP)
9	2 May	Tortosa to Valencia	190 km (118 mi)		Pierino Baffi (ITA)
10	3 May	Valencia to Cuenca	222 km (138 mi)		Antonio Uliana (ITA)
11	4 May	Cuenca to Madrid	168 km (104 mi)		Donato Piazza (ITA)
12	5 May	Madrid to Madrid	15 km (9 mi)	Team time trial	Italy A
13	6 May	Madrid to Valladolid	222 km (138 mi)		Fiorenzo Magni (ITA)
14	7 May	Valladolid to Bilbao	308 km (191 mi)		Donato Piazza (ITA)
15	8 May	Bilbao to Bilbao	147 km (91 mi)		Fiorenzo Magni (ITA)
	Total		2,740 km (1,703 mi)		

== Results ==
Final general classification
Rank	Rider	Team	Time
1	(France) Jean Dotto		81h 04' 02"
2	(Spain) Antonio Jiménez Quiles		+ 3' 06"
3	(France) Raphaël Géminiani		+ 5' 05"
4	(Spain) Jesús Loroño		+ 5' 52"
5	(Spain) Vicente Iturat		+ 6' 24"
6	(Spain) Gabriel Company		+ 6' 30"
7	(Spain) José Serra Gil		+ 7' 31"
8	(Italy) Giuseppe Buratti		+ 8' 42"
9	(Spain) Cosme Barrutia		+ 9' 37"
10	(France) Georges Gay		+ 9' 44"
11	(Spain) Salvador Botella		
12	(Spain) Carmelo Morales		
13	(Italy) Fiorenzo Magni		
14	(Spain) Bernardo Ruiz		
15	(Spain) Andrés Trobat		
16	(Spain) José Gómez del Moral		
17	(Belgium) Arsene Bauwens		
18	(Italy) Gastone Nencini		
19	(Spain) Francisco Moreno		
20	(Spain) Antonio Gelabert		
21	(Spain) Federico Bahamontes		
22	(Spain) Manolo Rodríguez		
23	(France) Nello Lauredi		
24	(Spain) Emilio Rodríguez		
25	(Spain) Miguel Gual		
