= Serge David =

French cyclist

Personal information
- Born: 31 August 1932
- Died: 13 April 1991 (aged 58)

Cycling career
- Sport: Cycling
- Role: Rider

Serge David (31 August 1932 – 13 April 1991) was a French racing cyclist. He rode in the 1958 Tour de France.
