= Robert Roudaut =

French cyclist

Personal information
- Born: 22 December 1931
- Died: 30 November 2012 (aged 80)

Cycling career
- Sport: Cycling
- Role: Rider

Robert Roudaut (22 December 1931 – 30 November 2012) was a French racing cyclist. He rode in the 1958 Tour de France.
