= Claude Barmier =

French cyclist

Personal information
- Born: 5 June 1933 (age 93)

Cycling career
- Sport: Cycling
- Role: Rider

Claude Barmier (born 5 June 1933) is a French racing cyclist. He rode in the 1958 Tour de France.
