= Günther Debusmann =

German cyclist (1931–2013)

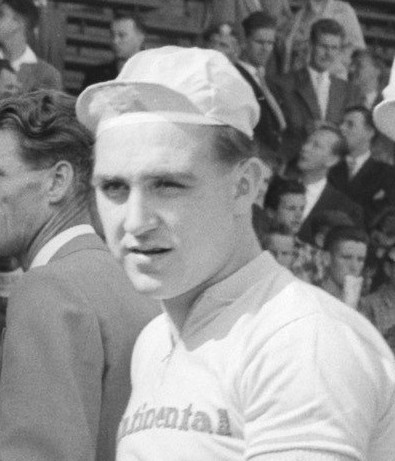
- Debusmann in 1956

Personal information
- Born: 12 June 1931
- Died: 6 February 2013 (aged 81)

Cycling career
- Sport: Cycling
- Role: Rider

Günther Debusmann (12 June 1931 – 6 February 2013) was a German racing cyclist. He rode in the 1958 Tour de France. He died on 6 February 2013, at the age of 81.
