= 1957 Volta a Catalunya =

Race details
- Dates: 1–8 September 1957
- Stages: 8
- Distance: 1,296.8 km (805.8 mi)
- Winning time: 34h 56' 49"

Results
Jersey awarded to the overall winner	Winner	Jesús Loroño (ESP)
	Second	Salvador Botella (ESP)
	Third	René Marigil (ESP)

The 1957 Volta a Catalunya was the 37th edition of the Volta a Catalunya cycle race and was held from 1 September to 8 September 1957. The race started in Montjuïc and finished in Barcelona. The race was won by Jesús Loroño.

== General classification ==
Final general classification

Rank	Rider	Time
1	Jesús Loroño (ESP)	34h 56' 49"
2	Salvador Botella (ESP)	+ 1' 41"
3	René Marigil (ESP)	+ 2' 33"
4	Luis Otaño (ESP)	+ 3' 00"
5	Antonio Jiménez Quiles (ESP)	+ 4' 29"
6	Miguel Pacheco (ESP)	+ 5' 42"
7	Bernardo Ruiz (ESP)	+ 7' 52"
8	Michel Stolker (NED)	+ 9' 47"
9	Gabriel Mas (ESP)	+ 13' 04"
10	Federico Bahamontes (ESP)	+ 14' 35"
