= Maurice Lavigne =

French cyclist (1930–2017)

Personal information
- Born: 30 October 1930 Dinard, Ille-et-Vilaine, France
- Died: 19 September 2017 (aged 86)

Cycling career
- Sport: Cycling
- Role: Rider

Maurice Lavigne (30 October 1930, Dinard – 19 September 2017) was a French racing cyclist. He rode in the 1958 Tour de France.
