= Mathias Löder =

German cyclist (born 1933)

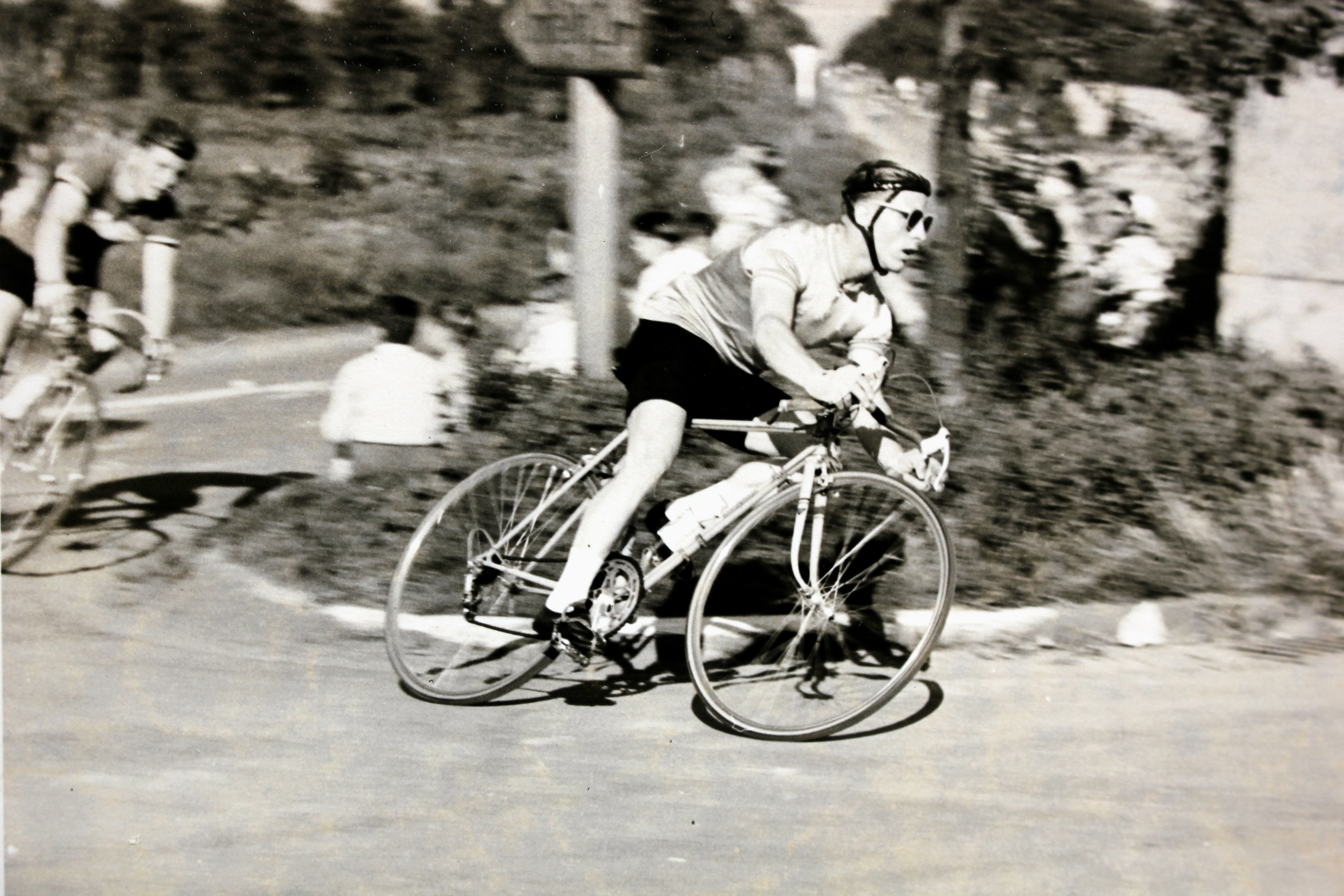
- Löder in 1960

Personal information
- Born: 29 December 1933 (age 92)

Cycling career
- Sport: Cycling
- Role: Rider

Mathias Löder (born 29 December 1933) is a German racing cyclist. He rode in the 1958 Tour de France. and competed in cycling races in Germany and Belgium.

Löder raced for professional cycling team Torpedo - Fichtel & Sachs from 1957 to 1959, achieving top 4 finishes in three events:

- 3rd - GP Fichtel & Sachs - 1957
- 3rd - GP Veith - 1957
- 4th - GP Veith - 1959
