= Sant Antoni de Vilamajor =

- Municipality
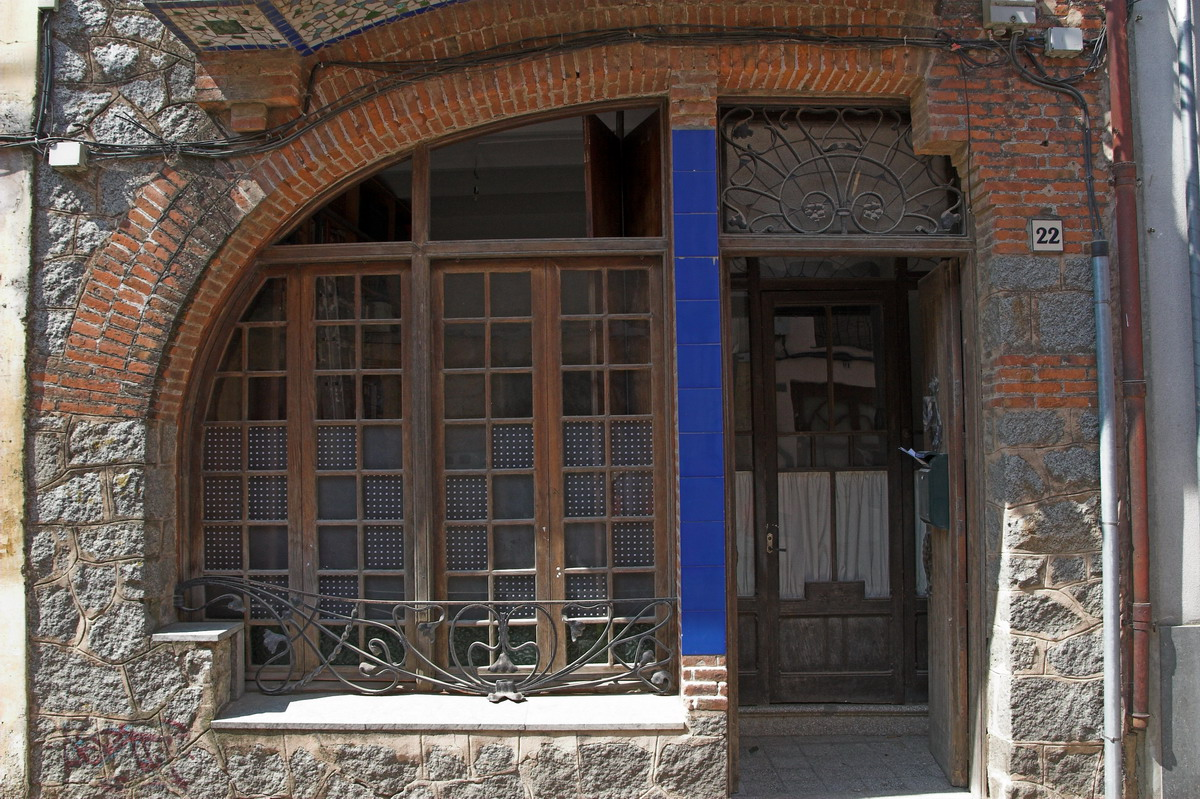
- Casa Millet

- Coat of arms

- Location in Catalonia Sant Antoni de Vilamajor (Spain)
- Coordinates: 41°40′29″N 2°24′6″E
- Country: Spain
- Community: Catalonia
- Province: Barcelona
- Comarca: Vallès Oriental

Government
  - Mayor: Maria Lluïsa Berdala Cirera (2015)

Area
  - Total: 13.7 km^{2} (5.3 sq mi)

Population (2025-01-01)
  - Total: 6,724
  - Density: 491/km^{2} (1,270/sq mi)
- Website: www.santantonidevilamajor.cat

Sant Antoni de Vilamajor (Catalan pronunciation: [ˌsant ənˈtɔni ðə ˌβiləməˈʒo]) is a village in the comarca of Vallès Oriental in the province of Barcelona and autonomous community of Catalonia, Spain. The municipality covers an area of 13.7 square kilometres (5.3 sq mi) and the population in 2014 was 5,708.

== Local enterprises ==
Ràdio Vilamajor is a local radio station, broadcasting from the town to the surrounding region.

== Notable residents ==
- Álex Palou (born 1997), IndyCar Series driver
