= Kaj Allan Olsen =

Danish cyclist

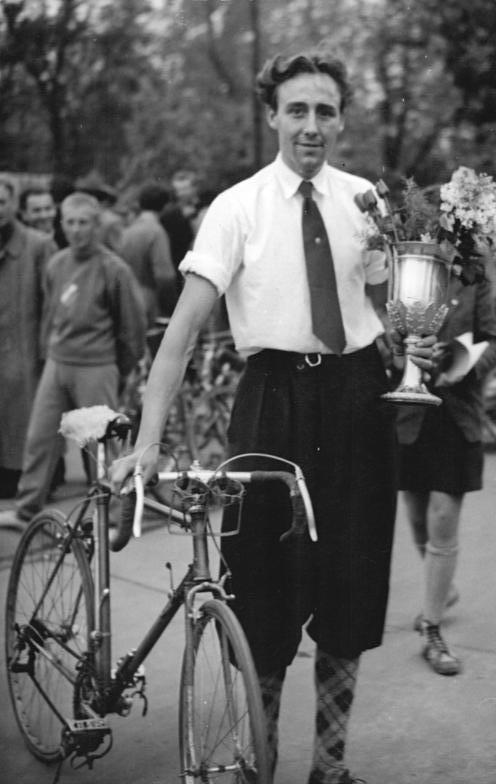

Personal information
- Born: 10 February 1927 Gentofte, Denmark

Cycling career
- Sport: Cycling
- Discipline: Road
- Role: Rider

Kaj Allan Olsen (born 10 February 1927) is a Danish former racing cyclist. He rode in the 1958 Tour de France. He also won the 1951 Peace Race.

== Major results ==
1949
3rd Overall Tour de Pologne

1st Stages 10 & 11

1951
1st Overall Peace Race

1st Stage 6

1956
3rd Scheldeprijs
