= 1954 Volta a Catalunya =

Race details
- Dates: 5–12 September 1954
- Stages: 10
- Distance: 1,287 km (799.7 mi)
- Winning time: 39h 13' 36"

Results
	Winner	Walter Serena (ITA)
	Second	Alberto Sant (ESP)
	Third	Miguel Poblet (ESP)

The 1954 Volta a Catalunya was the 34th edition of the Volta a Catalunya cycle race and was held from 5 September to 12 September 1954. The race started in Montjuïc and finished in Barcelona. The race was won by Walter Serena.

== General classification ==
Final general classification

Rank	Rider	Time
1	Walter Serena (ITA)	39h 13' 36"
2	Alberto Sant (ESP)	+ 1' 43"
3	Miguel Poblet (ESP)	+ 8' 10"
4	Salvador Botella (ESP)	+ 8' 10"
5	Gabriel Company (ESP)	+ 9' 30"
6	José Serra Gil (ESP)	+ 12' 04"
7	Antonio Gelabert (ESP)	+ 14' 00"
8	Francisco Alomar (ESP)	+ 14' 48"
9	Emilio Rodríguez (ESP)	+ 15' 28"
10	Andrés Trobat (ESP)	+ 15' 45"
