= 1957 Vuelta a España =

Race details
- Dates: 26 April – 12 May
- Stages: 16
- Distance: 2,967 km (1,844 mi)
- Winning time: 84h 44' 06"

Results
Jersey awarded to the overall winner	Winner	Jesús Loroño (ESP)
	Second	Federico Bahamontes (ESP)
	Third	Bernardo Ruiz (ESP)
Jersey awarded to the points classification winner	Points	Vicente Iturat (ESP)
	Mountains	Federico Bahamontes (ESP)

The 12th Vuelta a España (Tour of Spain), a long-distance bicycle stage race and one of the three grand tours, was held from 26 April to 12 May 1957. It consisted of 16 stages covering a total of 2,967 km (1,844 mi), and was won by Jesús Loroño. Vicente Iturat won the points classification and Federico Bahamontes won the mountains classification.

== Route ==
List of stages
Stage	Date	Course	Distance	Type	Winner
1	26 April	Bilbao to Vitoria	158 km (98 mi)		Miguel Chacón (ESP)
2	27 April	Vitoria to Santander	220 km (137 mi)		Carmelo Morales (ESP)
3	28 April	Santander to Mieres	259 km (161 mi)		Federico Bahamontes (ESP)
4	29 April	Mieres to León			Annulled
5	30 April	León to Valladolid	172 km (107 mi)		Roger Hassenforder (FRA)
6	1 May	Valladolid to Madrid	212 km (132 mi)		Miguel Chacón (ESP)
7	2 May	Madrid to Madrid	200 km (124 mi)		Jan Adriaensens (BEL)
8	3 May	Madrid to Cuenca	159 km (99 mi)		Roger Walkowiak (FRA)
9	5 May	Cuenca to Valencia	249 km (155 mi)		Rino Benedetti (ITA)
10	6 May	Valencia to Tortosa	192 km (119 mi)		Bruno Tognaccini (ITA)
11	7 May	Tortosa to Barcelona	199 km (124 mi)		Gilbert Bauvin (FRA)
12	8 May	Igualada to Zaragoza	229 km (142 mi)		Mario Baroni (ITA)
13	9 May	Zaragoza to Huesca	85 km (53 mi)	Individual time trial	Jesús Loroño (ESP)
14	10 May	Huesca to Bayonne (France)	249 km (155 mi)		Antonio Ferraz (ESP)
15	11 May	Bayonne (France) to San Sebastián	199 km (124 mi)		Roger Baens (BEL)
16	12 May	San Sebastián to Bilbao	193 km (120 mi)		Antonio Suárez (ESP)
	Total		2,967 km (1,844 mi)		

== Results ==
Final general classification
Rank	Rider	Team	Time
1	(Spain) Jesús Loroño		84h 44' 06"
2	(Spain) Federico Bahamontes		+ 8' 11"
3	(Spain) Bernardo Ruiz		+ 9' 34"
4	(Portugal) José Manuel Ribeiro Da Silva		+ 14' 32"
5	(France) Raphaël Géminiani		+ 17' 07"
6	(Spain) Francisco Moreno		+ 18' 43"
7	(Belgium) Jan Adriaenssens		+ 19' 38"
8	(Italy) Pasquale Fornara		+ 23' 48"
9	(Italy) Gastone Nencini		+ 25' 59"
10	(Spain) Salvador Botella		+ 28' 06"
11	(Italy) Guido Boni		
12	(Spain) Vicente Iturat		
13	(France) Jean Dotto		
14	(Spain) Alberto Sant		
15	(France) Roger Walkowiak		
16	(Spain) Carmelo Morales		
17	(Portugal) Antonio Barbosa		
18	(Spain) Francisco Masip		
19	(France) Jean Malléjac		
20	(Spain) Antonio Ferraz		
21	(Spain) Antonio Suárez		
22	(Belgium) Roger Baens		
23	(Spain) Benigno Aspuru		
24	(France) Gilbert Bauvin		
25	(Spain) Juan Campillo		
