= Mariano Corrales =

Spanish cyclist

Personal information
- Full name: Mariano Corrales Lausín
- Born: unknown Zaragoza, Aragon, Spain
- Died: unknown

Cycling career
- Sport: Cycling
- Discipline: Road
- Role: Rider

Professional teams
- 1951: Peña Nicky's
- 1955: Peña Solera-Cacaolat
- 1957: Pérez de Sitges

Major wins
- 2 stage Volta a Catalunya

Mariano Corrales Lausín was a Spanish professional road bicycle racer, who competed as a professional between 1951 and 1957.

== Biography ==
Mariano Corrales was born in Zaragoza, Aragon. Mariano Corrales also win at the Volta a Catalunya. Corrales won the Trofeo Jaumendreu in 1951 and rode in two editions of the Volta a Catalunya in 1951 and 1954, where he won two stages. He also competed in the 1955 and 1956 Vuelta a España. Corrales had around 13 amateur victories prior to turning professional. He retired after his team, Pérez de Sitges announced 1957 would be its final season in professional cycling.

== Major results ==
1951
1st Trofeo Jaumendreu
1st Stage 5 Volta a Catalunya
1953
1st GP Pascuas
1st Clàssica a los Puertos
1st Stage 2 Vuelta a Asturias
1954
1st Stage 4 Volta a Catalunya
1955
1st Stage 5 Vuelta a Andalucía
1st Stage 1 Vuelta a Asturias
2nd Overall Vuelta a Levante

1st Stage 2

=== Vuelta a España results ===
- 1955: DNF
- 1956: DNF
