= Franz Reitz =

German cyclist

Personal information
- Born: 28 January 1929 Wiesbaden, Germany
- Died: 10 June 2011 (aged 82) Wiesbaden, Germany

Cycling career
- Sport: Cycling
- Role: Rider

Franz Reitz (28 January 1929 – 10 June 2011) was a German racing cyclist. He won the German National Road Race in 1957.
