= Ian Steel =

Scottish cyclist

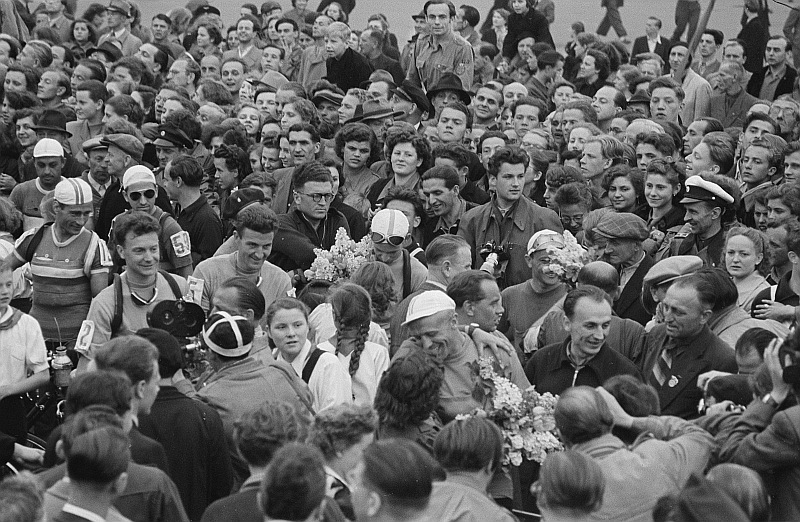
- At the start of the 8th stage of the Peace Race in Leipzig (Ian with number 5, left centre)

Personal information
- Born: 28 December 1928 Glasgow, Scotland
- Died: 20 October 2015 (aged 86)

Cycling career
- Sport: Cycling

Professional teams
- 1951–1956: Viking cycles
- 1956: Cilo-St-Raphaël

Major wins
- Peace Race (1952); Tour of Britain (1951); National Road Race Championships (1952)

John "Ian" Steel (28 December 1928 – 20 October 2015) was a Scottish racing cyclist who in 1952 won the Peace Race, a central European race between Warsaw, Berlin and Prague. He was the only Briton, and the only rider from the English-speaking world to win it, as well as the first Briton to win any major race. He also won the Tour of Britain as a semi-professional and was at one stage second in the 1952 Tour of Mexico before crashing.

== Biography ==
Steel was born in Glasgow, Scotland in 1928, to John and Jane (née White) who ran a dairy shop, and grew up in Glasgow and Dunoon, where he and his sister lived with their grandparents after being evacuated due to the start of World War II. He joined the Glasgow United club at 18, in 1946, having been introduced by a friend, John Brierley. His first race was a 25-mile (40 km) time-trial, in 1946. He finished third in 1h 13m 55s, two minutes behind the winner. He improved and won time trials at 25, 50 and 100 miles and over 12 hours. He came into cycling at a time when racing was engaged in a civil war between the National Cyclists Union and a new body, the British League of Racing Cyclists. The BLRC began organising massed-start races on the public road, a form of the sport the NCU had banned in the 19th century because it feared it would bring problems for all cyclists. Steel moved in 1951 from Glasgow United to the Glasgow Wheelers, which supported the BLRC. Scotland's governing body, the Scottish Cyclists' Union, was not involved in the dispute, although the civil war between the NCU and BLRC affected Scottish riders racing abroad.

The BLRC sent national teams abroad and in 1951 Steel rode for Scotland in Paris-Lens and came second. His ride impressed a semi-professional team in England sponsored by Viking Cycles. The BLRC supported the idea of semi-professionals and it allowed them in the Tour of Britain which it promoted.

Steel won the 1951 Tour of Britain and three of its stages. It was the first time he had been to England. He won another stage the following year and became national champion.

Steel was married to Peggy, the sister-in-law of his mechanic on the Viking team. The couple lived an itinerant life, living in France, Spain and Gibraltar, before crossing the Atlantic in a yacht and criss-crossing North America in a motorhome, before settling in Largs. After Steel's retirement from competitive cycling they combined their travels with running a bed and breakfast for six months of the year. They were married for 62 years. Steel died on 20 October 2015.

== The Peace Race ==
The Tour of Britain stage win was another feature of his most successful season, the one in which he won the Peace Race. He rode for a British team sent to communist Europe – the race was largely ridden by members of the post-war communist bloc and was intended to unite them in sport – by the BLRC. The NCU had turned down the invitation.

The race lasted from 30 April until 13 May and covered 2,138 km (1,328 mi) at 37.5 km/h (23.3 mph), much of the way on poor roads. Only two stages finished on hard surfaces, the others ending on tracks of shale or cinders. Steel moved into first position on the eighth stage, held on a mountainous parcours to Chemnitz, where he finished nine minutes ahead of the previous leader, the Czech rider Jan Veselý. He won the entire race in 57h 6m 17s, with Veselý in second position two and a half minutes behind. In addition he led the British squad to victory in the teams classification.

The British team won £2,000 of goods – there was no professional racing behind the Iron Curtain – including brief cases, watches, cameras, radios and shaving gear and toiletries. Steel won a bicycle which he gave away to a fellow Scotsman living in Prague.

=== Domestic effects ===
The magazine Cycling Weekly said: "Steel's triumph – he also led a British team win – has never been officially acknowledged". His famous result in 1952 had a direct influence on Britain's warring cycling bodies, forcing them to accept an uneasy truce before they eventually amalgamated seven years later. When Steel's victory in the toughest amateur stage race in the world won the BLRC international recognition from the Union Cycliste Internationale, the NCU was outraged. But the UCI, tired of the rift in British cycling, threatened the NCU with expulsion if it failed to work at a solution. Eventually the BLRC and NCU merged to form the British Cycling Federation.

Steel was honoured on the 50th anniversary of winning the Peace Race by the Association of the British League of Racing Cyclists.

== Later career ==
Steel rode for Viking Cycles from 1951 to 1955. In 1955 he rode the Tour de France in the first team Britain had entered. Many of the riders were from a rival domestic team sponsored by Hercules. So was the manager, Syd Cozens. The writer William Fotheringham said: "The Scot was riding strongly but he was a member of the Viking team, Hercules' big domestic rival. When Cozens ordered him to drop back from the main group to support a team-mate during a mountain stage, Steel protested that he was not willing to sacrifice his own chances. He was threatened with expulsion and duly went home, his morale in tatters."

Only two of the British team finished the race; Brian Robinson 29th and Tony Hoar 69th and more than six hours behind the winner. His teammate Robinson had secured a contract to ride for a Swiss team, Cilo-St Raphaël and Steel joined him with Hoar and a third Briton, Bernard Pusey. Its star rider was Hugo Koblet. But it was a poor team in which most riders, including Robinson, were given just a bike, jersey and expenses and a chance to win prizes. Steel returned to Britain and rode his last season in 1956, again for Viking Cycles. He became the team's manager. Reverting to amateur status was difficult and lengthy and Steel retired at the end of the season. His career was at its height in 1951 and 1952 but he had no wins from 1953 to 1956.

== Awards and commemoration ==
=== The Golden Book ===
Steel's achievements were celebrated in the 1990s when Cycling Weekly awarded him his own page in the Golden Book of Cycling.
