= Emiel Van Cauter =

Belgian cyclist

- Van Cauter as Belgian champion in 1955

Personal information
- Full name: Emiel Van Cauter
- Born: 2 December 1931 Wolvertem, Belgium
- Died: 26 October 1975 (aged 43) Bangkok, Thailand

Cycling career
- Sport: Cycling
- Role: Rider

Emiel Van Cauter (2 December 1931 – 26 October 1975) was a Belgian racing cyclist. He won the Belgian national road race title in 1955.
