= Philippe Agut =

French cyclist

Personal information
- Born: 1 August 1929 Bizanet, France
- Died: 23 October 1988 (aged 59) Le Versoud, France

Cycling career
- Sport: Cycling
- Role: Rider

Philippe Agut (1 August 1929 – 23 October 1988) was a French professional racing cyclist. He rode in three editions of the Tour de France.
