= Günther Pankoke =

German cyclist

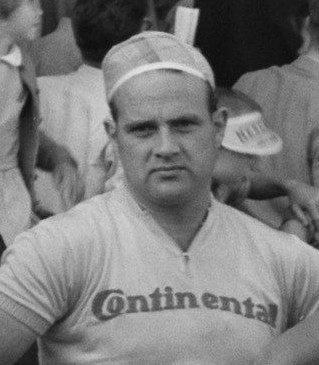
- Pankoke in 1956

Personal information
- Born: 13 August 1925
- Died: 6 December 1999 (aged 74)

Cycling career
- Sport: Cycling
- Role: Rider

Günther Pankoke (13 August 1925 – 6 December 1999) was a German racing cyclist. He rode in the 1955 Tour de France.
