= Oskar von Büren =

Swiss cyclist

Personal information
- Born: 27 March 1933 (age 93) Zurich, Switzerland

Cycling career
- Sport: Cycling

Oskar von Büren (born 27 March 1933) is a Swiss cyclist. He competed in the 4,000 metres team pursuit event at the 1952 Summer Olympics.
