= Giuseppe Pintarelli =

Italian cyclist

Personal information
- Born: 21 January 1931
- Died: 26 May 2002 (aged 71)

Cycling career
- Sport: Cycling
- Role: Rider

Giuseppe Pintarelli (21 January 1931 – 26 May 2002) was an Italian racing cyclist. He rode in the 1957 Tour de France.
