= Antonio Jiménez Quiles =

Spanish cyclist (1934–2023)

Antonio Jiménez
Personal information
- Full name: Antonio Jiménez Quiles
- Born: 13 July 1934 Granada, Spain
- Died: 15 June 2023 (aged 88)

Cycling career
- Sport: Cycling
- Discipline: Road
- Role: Rider

Professional teams
- 1954: UV Granada
- 1955: Gamma
- 1956: UC Tarrasa–Mostajo
- 1957: Gamma
- 1958: Faema–Guerra
- 1959–1961: Kas–Boxing
- 1962: Licor 43
- 1963: Margnat–Paloma–Dunlop

Antonio Jiménez Quiles (13 July 1934 – 15 June 2023) was a Spanish road cyclist. Professional from 1954 to 1963, he most notably finished 2nd overall at the 1955 Vuelta a España, while being the youngest competitor at 20 years old. He also won a stage of the 1958 Vuelta a España.

Jiménez Quiles died on 15 June 2023, at the age of 88.

== Major results ==
1955
1st Overall Vuelta a Navarra
1st Stage 4b Vuelta a Levante
1st Stage 2 GP Ayutamiento de Bilbao
2nd Overall Vuelta a España
2nd GP Goierri
6th Overall Volta a Catalunya
1956
1st Stage 3 Vuelta a Levante
4th Overall Vuelta a Andalucía
1957
1st National Hill-climb Championships
1st Stage 1 Gran Premio de la Bicicleta Eibarresa
3rd Road race, National Road Championships
4th Overall Vuelta a Andalucía
5th Overall Volta a Catalunya
1959
4th Trofeo Masferrer
1960
1st National Hill-climb Championships
1961
1st Stage 9 Volta a Portugal
