= José Mateo =

Spanish cyclist (1928–2019)

José Mateo Gil
Personal information
- Born: 16 March 1928 Fígols, Spain
- Died: 27 August 2019 (aged 91) Olesa de Montserrat, Spain

Cycling career
- Sport: Cycling
- Discipline: Road
- Role: Rider

Professional teams
- 1950–1952: C.C. Barcelona
- 1955: Mariotas
- 1956–1957: Mobylette Coabania

José Mateo Gil (16 March 1928 – 27 August 2019) was a Spanish racing cyclist. Professional from 1951, to 1957, he rode in the 1955 Tour de France. Gil also took several professional wins in his career, including three stages of the Volta a Catalunya, a stage of the Volta a Portugal and the Campionat de Barcelona on two occasions.

He died in 2019 at the age of 91.
