= Joan Crespo Hita =

Spanish cyclist (1927–2014)

Joan Crespo
Personal information
- Full name: Joan Crespo Hita
- Born: 7 March 1927 Barcelona, Catalonia, Spain
- Died: 9 April 2014 (aged 87) Barcelona, Catalonia, Spain

Cycling career
- Sport: Cycling
- Discipline: Road
- Role: Rider

Professional teams
- 1946–1947: C.C. Provenzalense
- 1948: C.C. Barcelones
- 1949: Galindo and C.D. Sabadell
- 1950–1952: P.C. Nicky's
- 1953: Follis and C.C. Barcelona
- 1954–1955: Follis and P.C. Nicky's
- 1956: Follis
- 1957: Mobylette
- 1958: Ignis

Joan Crespo Hita (7 March 1927 – 9 April 2014) was a Spanish professional road bicycle racer, who competed as a professional between 1951 and 1959.

== Biography ==
Joan Crespo was born in Barcelona, Catalonia on March 7, 1927 and died in Barcelona at the age of 87. Crespo turned professional in 1951 with the Spanish team P.C. Nicky's. His main victory was the Trofeo Masferrer in 1958. He finished 39th in the general classification of the 1957 Vuelta a España. Crespo's last win was the GP de Martorell in 1959. Crespo retired from cycling at the end of the 1959 season. His father, Antonio Crespo Sanjuán, was one of the pioneers in the sport in Catalonia.

== Major results ==
1951
2nd Trofeo Jaumendreu
1952
1st Gran Premio Cataluña
1956
3rd GP de Martorell
1957
2nd Trofeo Masferrer
1958
1st Trofeo Masferrer
1959
1st GP de Martorell

=== Vuelta a España results ===
- 1957: 39th
