= Bruno Tognaccini =

Italian cyclist (1932–2013)

Personal information
- Born: 13 December 1932 Castelfranco Piandiscò
- Died: 13 August 2013 (aged 80) Castelfranco Piandiscò

Cycling career
- Sport: Cycling
- Role: Rider

Bruno Tognaccini (13 December 1932 – 13 August 2013) was an Italian racing cyclist. He won stage 11 of the 1956 Giro d'Italia.
