= Giuseppe Buratti =

Italian bicycle racer (1929–2008)

Personal information
- Born: 3 November 1929 Motta Visconti, Italy
- Died: 26 May 2008 (aged 78) Motta Visconti, Italy

Cycling career
- Sport: Cycling
- Discipline: Road
- Role: Rider

Professional teams
- 1953: Fréjus
- 1953: Feru
- 1954: Doniselli–Lansetina
- 1955: Leo–Chlorodont
- 1956–1957: Bianchi–Pirelli
- 1956–1957: Condor
- 1958: Molteni
- 1958: Mondia
- 1960: Curti

Giuseppe Buratti (3 November 1929 – 26 May 2008) was an Italian road cyclist. He most notably won the mountains classification at the 1955 Vuelta a España.

== Major results ==
1954
1st Giro delle Alpi Apuane
3rd Nice–Mont Agel
4th Giro dell'Appennino
7th Tre Valli Varesine
1955
3rd Nice–Mont Agel
8th Overall Vuelta a España

1st Mountains classification

1956
3rd Giro dell'Appennino
