= Gabriel Company =

Spanish cyclist (born 1930)

Personal information
- Full name: Gabriel Company Bauzá
- Born: 16 May 1930 (age 96) Sant Joan, Spain

Cycling career
- Sport: Cycling
- Current team: Retired
- Discipline: Road
- Role: Rider

Professional teams
- 1954–1955: Splendid–d'Alessandro
- 1956: Minaco–Peugeot
- 1957: Ignis–Doniselli
- 1957–1960: Faema–Guerra
- 1961: Catigene
- 1961: Emi
- 1962: Ferrys

Gabriel Company Bauzá (born 16 May 1930 in Sant Joan, Mallorca) is a Spanish former racing cyclist. In 1958 he won the Vuelta a Andalucía. He also finished 6th overall and won a stage of the 1955 Vuelta a España, and won a second stage in 1961.

== Major results ==
1953
2nd Campeonato Vasco Navarro de Montaña
1954
5th Overall Volta a Catalunya
1955
1st Overall Circuito Montañes
1st Trofeo Masferrer
1st Trofeo del Sprint
1st Stage 5 Euskal Bizikleta
2nd Overall Volta a Catalunya

1st Stage 2

2nd GP Pascuas
3rd Overall Vuelta a Asturias
6th Overall Vuelta a España

1st Stage 5

1956
1st Clásica a los Puertos de Guadarrama
4th Trofeo Masferrer
1957
1st Stage 5 Volta a Catalunya
1st Stage 8 Vuelta a Andalucía
4th Overall Vuelta Ciclista a la Comunidad Valenciana
1958
1st Overall Vuelta a Andalucía
2nd Trofeo Masferrer
2nd National Hill Climb Championship
1959
1st Trofeo Masferrer
6th Overall Vuelta Ciclista a la Comunidad Valenciana
7th Overall Vuelta a Andalucía
7th Campeonato Vasco Navarro de Montaña
1960
1st Stage 6 Vuelta a Andalucía
8th Trofeo Masferrer
1961
1st Stage 16 Vuelta a España
2nd Overall Madrid–Barcelona
