= Cosme Barrutia =

Spanish cyclist (1929–2005)

Personal information
- Full name: Cosme Barrutia Iturriagoitia
- Born: 27 September 1929 Iurreta, Spain
- Died: 12 November 2005 (aged 76)

Cycling career
- Sport: Cycling
- Discipline: Road
- Role: Rider

Professional teams
- 1949–1953: Individual
- 1954–1957: Gamma
- 1958–1959: Boxing Club
- 1960: Heron
- 1961: Catigene

Cosme Barrutia Iturriagoitia (27 September 1929 – 12 November 2005) was a Spanish cyclist. Professional between 1949 and 1960, he had 20 victories, including the 1955 Circuito de Getxo and 1956 Klasika Primavera.

His brother Antonio was also a professional cyclist.

== Major results ==
1953
1st National Cyclo-cross Championships
1st Overall Gran Premio Ayuntamiento de Bilbao

1st Stage 1

3rd Circuito de Getxo
3rd Subida a Arrate
8th Overall Vuelta a Asturias

1st Stage 5

1954
2nd Prueba Villafranca de Ordizia
1955
1st Circuito de Getxo
1st GP Portugalete
9th Overall Vuelta a España
1956
1st Klasika Primavera
6th Overall Vuelta a Asturias

1st Stage 5

1957
2nd Overall Vuelta Ciclista a La Rioja
