= Antonio Ferraz =

Spanish cyclist (1929–2024)

Personal information
- Full name: Antonio Ferraz Núñez
- Born: 28 June 1929 Güeñes, Spain
- Died: 1 June 2024 (aged 94) Santurtzi, Spain

Cycling career
- Sport: Cycling
- Current team: Retired
- Discipline: Road
- Role: Rider

Professional teams
- 1949–1954: Independent
- 1955: Gamma
- 1956: Minaco–Peugeot
- 1957: Mobylette
- 1958: Kas–Boxing
- 1959: Boxing Ciclo Club
- 1960: Brandy Majestad

Antonio Ferraz Núñez (28 June 1929 – 1 June 2024) was a Spanish former road racing cyclist. Professional from 1953 to 1961, he was a two-time national road race champion and also won a stage of the 1957 Vuelta a España.

== Major results ==
1955
1st Stages 6b Vuelta a Andalucía
2nd Overall GP Ayutamiento de Bilbao

1st Stages 3 & 4

1956
1st National Road Race Championships
1st Circuito de Getxo
1st Campeonato Vasco-Navarro de Montaña
1st Stage 2 Vuelta a Asturias
1957
1st National Road Race Championships
1st Stage 14 Vuelta a España
1st Trofeo Jaumendreu
1958
1st GP Llodio
1959
1st GP Llodio
