= Donato Piazza =

Italian cyclist

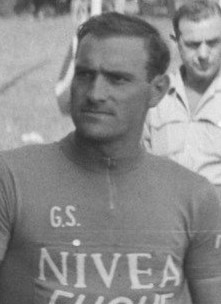
- Donato Piazza (1956)

Personal information
- Born: 2 January 1930 Villasanta
- Died: 14 September 1997 (aged 67) Bologna

Cycling career
- Sport: Cycling
- Role: Rider

Donato Piazza (2 January 1930 – 14 September 1997) was an Italian racing cyclist. He won stage 22 of the 1956 Giro d'Italia.
