= René Marigil =

Spanish cyclist (1928–2009)

Personal information
- Born: 24 October 1928 Carmaux, France
- Died: 25 October 2009 (aged 81) Sagunto, Spain

Cycling career
- Sport: Cycling
- Discipline: Road
- Role: Rider

Professional teams
- 1955: Feru
- 1956: Splendid–d'Alessandro
- 1956: Minaco–Peugeot
- 1957: Mobylette GAC
- 1958: Lube
- 1959–1962: Licor 43

René Marigil (24 October 1928 – 25 October 2009) was a Spanish professional racing cyclist. He rode in four editions of the Tour de France.

== Major results ==
1953
1st Stage 3 Gran Premio Cataluña
1955
3rd Overall Tour of Galicia
1956
1st Overall Vuelta a Levante
1st Stage 2 Vuelta a Mallorca
9th Trofeo Masferrer
1957
1st GP Pascuas
1st Stage 2 Vuelta a Andalucía
2nd Road race, National Road Championships
2nd Overall Vuelta a Asturias

1st Stage 5

3rd Overall Volta a Catalunya
4th Overall Euskal Bizikleta
1958
1st Stage 11 Vuelta a España
10th Overall Volta a Catalunya
10th Overall Vuelta a Andalucía
1959
9th Overall Vuelta a Andalucía

1st Stage 7

1960
1st Stage 4 Euskal Bizikleta
1961
7th Subida a Arrate
9th Overall Vuelta a Andalucía
1962
1st Stage 7 Vuelta a Andalucía
4th Overall Vuelta a Levante
