= José Gómez del Moral =

Spanish cyclist (1931–2021)

Personal information
- Full name: José Gómez del Moral
- Born: 4 December 1931 Cabra, Spain
- Died: 7 August 2021 (aged 89) Sogamoso, Colombia

Cycling career
- Sport: Cycling
- Discipline: Road
- Role: Rider
- Rider type: Climbing specialist

Professional teams
- 1955–1957: Minaco
- 1958: Lube–NSU
- 1959: Boxing Club
- 1960: Licor 43
- 1961–1962: Faema
- 1963: Flandria–Faema

Major wins
- Volta a Catalunya (1955); Vuelta a Andalucía (1955); Vuelta a Colombia (1957)

José Gómez del Moral (4 December 1931 – 7 August 2021) was a Spanish road racing cyclist. He was a professional cyclist from 1955 to 1963. During this time he won the Volta a Catalunya and the Vuelta a Andalucía in 1955 and the Vuelta a Colombia in 1957. He was the second, and last, non-Colombian winner of the Vuelta a Colombia of the 20th century. He was the brother of cyclist Antonio Gómez del Moral.

== Major results ==
1955
1st Overall Volta a Catalunya
1st Overall Vuelta a Andalucía

1st Stage 2

4th Overall Eibarko Bizikleta
7th Trofeo Masferrer
1956
2nd Overall Vuelta a Andalucía
4th Overall Vuelta a la Comunidad Valenciana

1st Stage 2

8th Overall Eibarko Bizikleta
1957
1st Overall Vuelta a Colombia

1st Stage 7

7th Overall Vuelta a la Comunidad Valenciana
1958
3rd Overall Vuelta a Andalucía

1st Stage 2

1959
4th Overall Vuelta a Andalucía

1st Stage 3

8th Overall Volta a Catalunya
8th Campeonato Vasco Navarro de Montaña
1960
2nd Overall Vuelta a Andalucía
6th Overall Volta a Catalunya
9th Overall Volta a Portugal
1961
1st Stage 1a (TTT) Vuelta a España
3rd Overall Madrid–Barcelona
1962
7th Overall Vuelta a Andalucía
