= List of cyclists in the 1950 Vuelta a España =

For the 1950 Vuelta a España, the field consisted of 42 riders; 26 finished the race.

Legend
No.	Starting number worn by the rider during the Vuelta
Pos.	Position in the general classification
DNF	Denotes a rider who did not finish

No.	Name	Nationality	Pos.
1	Rik Evens	BEL	14
2	Elias Walckiers	BEL	24
3	Frans Van Den Borre	BEL	DNF
4	Maurice Mollin	BEL	DNF
5	Omer Braeckeveldt	BEL	DNF
6	Umberto Drei	Italy	5
?	Giovanni Baratti	Italy	DNF
10	Alighiero Ridolfi	Italy	8
11	Bernardo Ruiz	Spain	4
12	Antonio Gelabert	Spain	9
14	José Serra	Spain	3
15	Emilio Rodríguez	Spain	1
16	Manuel Rodríguez	Spain	2
17	Bernardo Capó	Spain	7
18	Andrés Trobat	Spain	12
20	Alfonso Parra	Spain	DNF
21	Pedro Fernandez	Spain	DNF
22	Angel Bruna	Spain	19
29	Julián Aguirrezabal	Spain	DNF
30	José Antonio Landa	Spain	DNF
31	Francisco Michelena	Spain	DNF
32	Juan Cruz Ganzarain	Spain	DNF
33	Hortensio Vidaurreta	Spain	DNF
34	Eduardo Pascual	Spain	DNF
35	Senén Mesa	Spain	6
36	Luis Sanchez Huergo	Spain	13
37	Senen Blanco	Spain	18
38	Pedro San Jose	Spain	DNF
39	Jesús Loroño	Spain	10
40	Martín Mancisidor	Spain	16
41	Francisco Expósito	Spain	11
42	Pedro Machain	Spain	DNF
43	Luis Navarro	Spain	23
44	Antonio Sánchez	Spain	21
45	Julio San Emeterio	Spain	DNF
46	Guillermo Peregrina	Spain	25
48	Gonzalo Fuertes	Spain	26
49	Matias Alemany	Spain	22
50	Agustin Miro	Spain	17
51	Victorio García	Spain	15
52	Mateo Coll Bover	Spain	20
53	Ernesto Codina	Spain	DNF
