= 1950 Vuelta a España, Stage 1 to Stage 11 =

Cycling race stages

The 1950 Vuelta a España was the 9th edition of Vuelta a España, one of cycling's Grand Tours. The Vuelta began in Madrid with on 17 August and Stage 11 occurred on 29 August with a stage to Tarragona. The race finished in Madrid on 10 September.

== Stage 1 ==
17 August 1950 - Madrid to Valladolid, 190 km (118.1 mi)

Stage 1 result and general classification after Stage 1

Rank	Rider	Time
1	Omer Braeckeveldt (BEL)	6h 19' 28"
2	José Serra (ESP)	s.t.
3	Francisco Expósito (ESP)	s.t.
4	Bernardo Ruiz (ESP)	s.t.
5	Umberto Drei (ITA)	s.t.
6	Alighiero Ridolfi (ITA)	s.t.
7	Emilio Rodríguez (ESP)	s.t.
8	Bernardo Capó (ESP)	s.t.
9	Senén Mesa (ESP)	s.t.
10	Jesús Loroño (ESP)	s.t.

== Stage 2 ==
18 August 1950 - Valladolid to León, 133 km (82.6 mi)

Stage 2 result

Rank	Rider	Time
1	Rik Evens (BEL)	4h 29' 39"
2	Maurice Mollin (BEL)	s.t.
3	Bernardo Ruiz (ESP)	s.t.
4	Luis Sanchez Huergo (ESP)	s.t.
5	Omer Braeckeveldt (BEL)	s.t.
6	Jesús Loroño (ESP)	s.t.
7	José Serra (ESP)	s.t.
8	Francisco Expósito (ESP)	s.t.
9	Emilio Rodríguez (ESP)	s.t.
10	Umberto Drei (ITA)	s.t.

General classification after Stage 2

Rank	Rider	Time
1	Omer Braeckeveldt (BEL)	10h 48' 07"
2	Jesús Loroño (ESP)	+ 22"
3	José Serra (ESP)	+ 1' 00"
4	Bernardo Ruiz (ESP)	s.t.
5	Francisco Expósito (ESP)	s.t.
6	Emilio Rodríguez (ESP)	s.t.
7	Umberto Drei (ITA)	s.t.
8	Alighiero Ridolfi (ITA)	s.t.
9	Manuel Rodríguez (ESP)	s.t.
10	Bernardo Capó (ESP)	s.t.

== Stage 3 ==
19 August 1950 - León to Gijón, 148 km (92 mi)

Stage 3 result

Rank	Rider	Time
1	Emilio Rodríguez (ESP)	4h 43' 22"
2	Omer Braeckeveldt (BEL)	s.t.
3	Elias Walckiers (BEL)	s.t.
4	Victorio García (ESP)	s.t.
5	Luis Sanchez Huergo (ESP)	s.t.
6	Umberto Drei (ITA)	s.t.
7	Alighiero Ridolfi (ITA)	s.t.
8	Pedro Fernandez (ESP)	s.t.
9	Frans Van Den Borre (BEL)	s.t.
10	Martín Mancisidor (ESP)	s.t.

General classification after Stage 3

Rank	Rider	Time
1	Omer Braeckeveldt (BEL)	15h 31' 29"
2	Emilio Rodríguez (ESP)	s.t.
3	Jesús Loroño (ESP)	+ 43"
4	Umberto Drei (ITA)	+ 1' 00"
5	Alighiero Ridolfi (ITA)	s.t.
6	Manuel Rodríguez (ESP)	s.t.
7	Bernardo Capó (ESP)	+ 1' 11"
8	Senén Mesa (ESP)	+ 1' 26"
9	Francisco Expósito (ESP)	+ 6' 37"
10	Bernardo Ruiz (ESP)	+ 9' 24"

== Stage 4a ==
20 August 1950 - Gijón to Torrelavega, 167 km (104 mi)

Stage 4a result

Rank	Rider	Time
1	Agustin Miro (ESP)	6h 29' 36"
2	Emilio Rodríguez (ESP)	+ 17' 52"
3	Omer Braeckeveldt (BEL)	s.t.
4	Manuel Rodríguez (ESP)	s.t.
5	Umberto Drei (ITA)	s.t.
6	José Serra (ESP)	s.t.
7	Alighiero Ridolfi (ITA)	s.t.
8	Rik Evens (BEL)	s.t.
9	Elias Walckiers (BEL)	s.t.
10	Frans Van Den Borre (BEL)	s.t.

== Stage 4b ==
20 August 1950 - Torrelavega to Santander, 78 km (48 mi)

Stage 4b result

Rank	Rider	Time
1	Emilio Rodríguez (ESP)	2h 42' 03"
2	José Serra (ESP)	s.t.
3	Antonio Gelabert (ESP)	s.t.
4	Manuel Rodríguez (ESP)	s.t.
5	Umberto Drei (ITA)	+ 3' 07"
6	Bernardo Ruiz (ESP)	s.t.
7	Alighiero Ridolfi (ITA)	s.t.
8	Martín Mancisidor (ESP)	s.t.
9	Jesús Loroño (ESP)	s.t.
10	Andrés Trobat (ESP)	s.t.

General classification after Stage 4b

Rank	Rider	Time
1	Emilio Rodríguez (ESP)	24h 59' 00"
2	Manuel Rodríguez (ESP)	+ 3' 00"
3	Jesús Loroño (ESP)	+ 5' 50"
4	Umberto Drei (ITA)	+ 6' 07"
5	Alighiero Ridolfi (ITA)	s.t.
6	Bernardo Capó (ESP)	+ 9' 03"
7	José Serra (ESP)	+ 11' 24"
8	Antonio Gelabert (ESP)	+ 12' 59"
9	Senén Mesa (ESP)	+ 14' 26"
10	Bernardo Ruiz (ESP)	+ 14' 31"

== Stage 5 ==
21 August 1950 - Santander to Bilbao, 177 km (110 mi)

Stage 5 result

Rank	Rider	Time
1	Antonio Gelabert (ESP)	7h 23' 42"
2	Rik Evens (BEL)	s.t.
3	Elias Walckiers (BEL)	s.t.
4	Umberto Drei (ITA)	s.t.
5	Alighiero Ridolfi (ITA)	s.t.
6	Bernardo Ruiz (ESP)	s.t.
7	José Serra (ESP)	s.t.
8	Emilio Rodríguez (ESP)	s.t.
9	Manuel Rodríguez (ESP)	s.t.
10	Andrés Trobat (ESP)	s.t.

== Stage 6 ==
22 August 1950 - Bilbao to Irun, 240 km (150 mi)

Stage 6 result

Rank	Rider	Time
1	Emilio Rodríguez (ESP)	9h 19' 46"
2	Umberto Drei (ITA)	s.t.
3	José Serra (ESP)	s.t.
4	Elias Walckiers (BEL)	s.t.
5	Francisco Expósito (ESP)	s.t.
6	Bernardo Ruiz (ESP)	s.t.
7	Manuel Rodríguez (ESP)	+ 9"
8	Bernardo Capó (ESP)	s.t.
9	Luis Sanchez Huergo (ESP)	+ 58"
10	Antonio Gelabert (ESP)	+ 1' 09"

General classification after Stage 6

Rank	Rider	Time
1	Emilio Rodríguez (ESP)	41h 36' 28"
2	Manuel Rodríguez (ESP)	+ 9' 00"
3	Umberto Drei (ITA)	+ 12' 07"
4	Bernardo Capó (ESP)	+ 15' 12"
5	Alighiero Ridolfi (ITA)	+ 15' 48"
6	Jesús Loroño (ESP)	+ 17' 07"
7	Alfonso Parra (ESP)	+ 17' 24"
8	Antonio Gelabert (ESP)	+ 18' 58"
9	Bernardo Ruiz (ESP)	+ 20' 31"
10	Senén Mesa (ESP)	+ 21' 32"

== Stage 7 ==
24 August 1950 - Irun to Pamplona, 109 km (68 mi)

Stage 7 result

Rank	Rider	Time
1	Emilio Rodríguez (ESP)	2h 50' 40"
2	José Serra (ESP)	s.t.
3	Manuel Rodríguez (ESP)	s.t.
4	Jesús Loroño (ESP)	s.t.
5	Bernardo Ruiz (ESP)	+ 2' 12"
6	Bernardo Capó (ESP)	s.t.
7	Martín Mancisidor (ESP)	s.t.
8	Francisco Expósito (ESP)	+ 4' 03"
9	Rik Evens (BEL)	s.t.
10	Umberto Drei (ITA)	s.t.

General classification after Stage 7

Rank	Rider	Time
1	Emilio Rodríguez (ESP)	44h 25' 08"
2	Manuel Rodríguez (ESP)	+ 11' 00"
3	Umberto Drei (ITA)	+ 18' 10"
4	Jesús Loroño (ESP)	+ 19' 24"
5	José Serra (ESP)	s.t.
6	Bernardo Capó (ESP)	s.t.
7	Bernardo Ruiz (ESP)	+ 24' 43"
8	Alighiero Ridolfi (ITA)	+ 26' 19"
9	Francisco Expósito (ESP)	+ 27' 57"
10	Antonio Gelabert (ESP)	+ 29' 49"

== Stage 8a ==
25 August 1950 - Pamplona to Tudela, 90 km (56 mi) (ITT)

Stage 8a result

Rank	Rider	Time
1	Bernardo Capó (ESP)	2h 29' 06"
2	Alighiero Ridolfi (ITA)	+ 3' 05"
3	Senén Mesa (ESP)	+ 4' 08"
4	Andrés Trobat (ESP)	+ 4' 56"
5	José Serra (ESP)	+ 6' 23"
6	Victorio García (ESP)	+ 7' 11"
7	Antonio Gelabert (ESP)	+ 9' 30"
8	Senen Blanco (ESP)	+ 9' 44"
9	Rik Evens (BEL)	+ 10' 12"
10	Manuel Rodríguez (ESP)	+ 10' 29"

== Stage 8b ==
25 August 1950 - Tudela to Zaragoza, 176 km (109 mi)

Stage 8b result

Rank	Rider	Time
1	Bernardo Ruiz (ESP)	2h 40' 48"
2	Rik Evens (BEL)	+ 5' 39"
3	José Serra (ESP)	+ 10' 28"
4	Alfonso Parra (ESP)	+ 11' 10"
5	Alighiero Ridolfi (ITA)	s.t.
6	Victorio García (ESP)	+ 12' 13"
7	Angel Bruna (ESP)	s.t.
8	Elias Walckiers (BEL)	s.t.
9	Antonio Gelabert (ESP)	s.t.
10	Emilio Rodríguez (ESP)	s.t.

General classification after Stage 8b

Rank	Rider	Time
1	Emilio Rodríguez (ESP)	49h 58' 44"
2	Bernardo Capó (ESP)	+ 6' 55"
3	Manuel Rodríguez (ESP)	+ 10' 00"
4	José Serra (ESP)	+ 13' 33"
5	Bernardo Ruiz (ESP)	+ 14' 46"
6	Alighiero Ridolfi (ITA)	+ 17' 52"
7	Umberto Drei (ITA)	+ 18' 34"
8	Senén Mesa (ESP)	+ 24' 45"
9	Antonio Gelabert (ESP)	+ 27' 40"
10	Francisco Expósito (ESP)	+ 29' 09"

== Stage 9 ==
26 August 1950 - Zaragoza to Lleida, 144 km (89 mi)

Stage 9 result

Rank	Rider	Time
1	Umberto Drei (ITA)	4h 51' 54"
2	Francisco Expósito (ESP)	s.t.
3	Alfonso Parra (ESP)	s.t.
4	Angel Bruna (ESP)	s.t.
5	Andrés Trobat (ESP)	s.t.
6	Mateo Coll Bover (ESP)	s.t.
7	Elias Walckiers (BEL)	s.t.
8	Alighiero Ridolfi (ITA)	s.t.
9	José Serra (ESP)	s.t.
10	Rik Evens (BEL)	s.t.

General classification after Stage 9

Rank	Rider	Time
1	Emilio Rodríguez (ESP)	54h 50' 03"
2	Bernardo Capó (ESP)	+ 7' 30"
3	Manuel Rodríguez (ESP)	+ 10' 30"
4	José Serra (ESP)	+ 14' 08"
5	Bernardo Ruiz (ESP)	+ 15' 21"
6	Umberto Drei (ITA)	+ 18' 09"
7	Alighiero Ridolfi (ITA)	+ 18' 27"
8	Senén Mesa (ESP)	+ 23' 20"
9	Antonio Gelabert (ESP)	+ 28' 15"
10	Francisco Expósito (ESP)	+ 29' 46"

== Stage 10 ==
27 August 1950 - Lleida to Barcelona, 167 km (104 mi)

Stage 10 result

Rank	Rider	Time
1	José Serra (ESP)	5h 14' 03"
2	Alighiero Ridolfi (ITA)	+ 7"
3	Antonio Gelabert (ESP)	s.t.
4	Mateo Coll Bover (ESP)	s.t.
5	Luis Sanchez Huergo (ESP)	s.t.
6	Francisco Expósito (ESP)	s.t.
7	Agustin Miro (ESP)	s.t.
8	Umberto Drei (ITA)	s.t.
9	Bernardo Capó (ESP)	s.t.
10	Rik Evens (BEL)	s.t.

General classification after Stage 10

Rank	Rider	Time
1	Emilio Rodríguez (ESP)	60h 04' 48"
2	Bernardo Capó (ESP)	+ 6' 55"
3	Manuel Rodríguez (ESP)	+ 10' 00"
4	José Serra (ESP)	+ 12' 26"
5	Bernardo Ruiz (ESP)	+ 14' 46"
6	Umberto Drei (ITA)	+ 17' 34"
7	Alighiero Ridolfi (ITA)	+ 18' 05"
8	Senén Mesa (ESP)	+ 24' 45"
9	Antonio Gelabert (ESP)	+ 27' 40"
10	Francisco Expósito (ESP)	+ 29' 11"

== Stage 11 ==
29 August 1950 - Barcelona to Tarragona, 150 km (93 mi)

Stage 11 result

Rank	Rider	Time
1	Rik Evens (BEL)	4h 37' 25"
2	José Serra (ESP)	s.t.
3	Emilio Rodríguez (ESP)	+ 11"
4	Umberto Drei (ITA)	+ 2' 03"
5	Manuel Rodríguez (ESP)	+ 4' 14"
6	Alighiero Ridolfi (ITA)	s.t.
7	Elias Walckiers (BEL)	s.t.
8	Andrés Trobat (ESP)	s.t.
9	Victorio García (ESP)	s.t.
10	Antonio Gelabert (ESP)	s.t.

General classification after Stage 11

Rank	Rider	Time
1	Emilio Rodríguez (ESP)	64h 42' 24"
2	Bernardo Capó (ESP)	+ 10' 58"
3	José Serra (ESP)	+ 11' 15"
4	Manuel Rodríguez (ESP)	+ 14' 03"
5	Bernardo Ruiz (ESP)	+ 18' 49"
6	Umberto Drei (ITA)	+ 19' 26"
7	Alighiero Ridolfi (ITA)	+ 21' 48"
8	Senén Mesa (ESP)	+ 28' 48"
9	Antonio Gelabert (ESP)	+ 31' 43"
10	Jesús Loroño (ESP)	+ 33' 27"
