= 1950 Vuelta a España, Stage 12 to Stage 22 =

Cycling race stages

The 1950 Vuelta a España was the 9th edition of Vuelta a España, one of cycling's Grand Tours. The Vuelta began in Madrid with on 17 August and Stage 12 occurred on 30 August with a stage from Tarragona. The race finished in Madrid on 10 September.

== Stage 12 ==
30 August 1950 - Tarragona to Castellón, 194 km (120.5 mi)

Stage 12 result

Rank	Rider	Time
1	Luis Navarro (ESP)	6h 51' 58"
2	Bernardo Ruiz (ESP)	s.t.
3	Senén Mesa (ESP)	s.t.
4	Luis Sanchez Huergo (ESP)	+ 1' 24"
5	Francisco Expósito (ESP)	s.t.
6	Mateo Coll Bover (ESP)	s.t.
7	Umberto Drei (ITA)	s.t.
8	Rik Evens (BEL)	s.t.

General classification after Stage 12

Rank	Rider	Time
1	Emilio Rodríguez (ESP)	71h 34' 46"
2	Bernardo Capó (ESP)	+ 11' 58"
3	José Serra (ESP)	+ 13' 15"
4	Manuel Rodríguez (ESP)	+ 15' 03"
5	Bernardo Ruiz (ESP)	+ 18' 14"
6	Umberto Drei (ITA)	+ 20' 26"
7	Alighiero Ridolfi (ITA)	+ 22' 48"
8	Senén Mesa (ESP)	+ 28' 24"
9	Antonio Gelabert (ESP)	+ 32' 43"
10	Jesús Loroño (ESP)	+ 34' 27"

== Stage 13 ==
31 August 1950 - Castellón to Valencia, 65 km (40 mi) (ITT)

Stage 13 result

Rank	Rider	Time
1	Antonio Sánchez (ESP)	1h 39' 03"
2	Emilio Rodríguez (ESP)	+ 7"
3	José Serra (ESP)	+ 46"
4	Manuel Rodríguez (ESP)	+ 52"
5	Bernardo Ruiz (ESP)	+ 56"
6	Senén Mesa (ESP)	+ 2' 06"
7	Alighiero Ridolfi (ITA)	+ 2' 28"
8	Senen Blanco (ESP)	+ 2' 52"
9	Rik Evens (BEL)	+ 3' 03"
10	Luis Sanchez Huergo (ESP)	+ 3' 05"

General classification after Stage 13

Rank	Rider	Time
1	Emilio Rodríguez (ESP)	73h 13' 56"
2	José Serra (ESP)	+ 12' 54"
3	Manuel Rodríguez (ESP)	+ 15' 48"
4	Bernardo Capó (ESP)	+ 17' 13"
5	Bernardo Ruiz (ESP)	+ 19' 14"
6	Alighiero Ridolfi (ITA)	+ 25' 10"
7	Senén Mesa (ESP)	+ 30' 23"
8	Umberto Drei (ITA)	+ 31' 55"
9	Francisco Expósito (ESP)	+ 42' 00"
10	Antonio Gelabert (ESP)	+ 44' 43"

== Stage 14 ==
1 September 1950 - Valencia to Murcia, 265 km (165 mi)

Stage 14 result

Rank	Rider	Time
1	Bernardo Ruiz (ESP)	
2	Umberto Drei (ITA)	s.t.
3	Antonio Gelabert (ESP)	s.t.
4	Rik Evens (BEL)	s.t.
5	Elias Walckiers (BEL)	s.t.
6	Alighiero Ridolfi (ITA)	s.t.
7	José Serra (ESP)	s.t.
8	Emilio Rodríguez (ESP)	s.t.
9	Manuel Rodríguez (ESP)	s.t.
10	Bernardo Capó (ESP)	s.t.

General classification after Stage 14

Rank	Rider	Time
1	Emilio Rodríguez (ESP)	82h 29' 17"
2	José Serra (ESP)	+ 13' 54"
3	Manuel Rodríguez (ESP)	+ 15' 48"
4	Bernardo Capó (ESP)	+ 17' 12"
5	Bernardo Ruiz (ESP)	+ 18' 14"
6	Alighiero Ridolfi (ITA)	+ 25' 10"
7	Senén Mesa (ESP)	+ 29' 51"
8	Umberto Drei (ITA)	+ 31' 55"
9	Francisco Expósito (ESP)	+ 42' 00"
10	Antonio Gelabert (ESP)	+ 44' 43"

== Stage 15 ==
2 September 1950 - Murcia to Lorca, 117 km (73 mi)

Stage 15 result

Rank	Rider	Time
1	Umberto Drei (ITA)	4h 10' 50"
2	Bernardo Ruiz (ESP)	+ 3' 01"
3	Alighiero Ridolfi (ITA)	s.t.
4	Senén Mesa (ESP)	s.t.
5	Manuel Rodríguez (ESP)	s.t.
6	Andrés Trobat (ESP)	s.t.
7	Agustin Miro (ESP)	s.t.
8	Martín Mancisidor (ESP)	s.t.
9	Luis Sanchez Huergo (ESP)	+ 5' 35"
10	Emilio Rodríguez (ESP)	s.t.

General classification after Stage 15

Rank	Rider	Time
1	Emilio Rodríguez (ESP)	86h 45' 42"
2	José Serra (ESP)	+ 14' 00"
3	Manuel Rodríguez (ESP)	+ 14' 04"
4	Bernardo Ruiz (ESP)	+ 16' 40"
5	Alighiero Ridolfi (ITA)	+ 23' 36"
6	Umberto Drei (ITA)	+ 25' 20"
7	Senén Mesa (ESP)	+ 29' 49"
8	Bernardo Capó (ESP)	+ 32' 24"
9	Antonio Gelabert (ESP)	+ 37' 39"
10	Jesús Loroño (ESP)	+ 49' 46"

== Stage 16 ==
3 September 1950 - Lorca to Granada, 222 km (138 mi)

Stage 16 result

Rank	Rider	Time
1	Alighiero Ridolfi (ITA)	8h 50' 03"
2	Guillermo Peregrina (ESP)	s.t.
3	Antonio Gelabert (ESP)	+ 9"
4	Umberto Drei (ITA)	s.t.
5	Francisco Expósito (ESP)	s.t.
6	Victorio García (ESP)	+ 17"
7	Agustin Miro (ESP)	s.t.
8	Bernardo Ruiz (ESP)	s.t.
9	Rik Evens (BEL)	+ 34"
10	Antonio Sánchez (ESP)	s.t.

General classification after Stage 16

Rank	Rider	Time
1	Emilio Rodríguez (ESP)	95h 36' 19"
2	Manuel Rodríguez (ESP)	+ 14' 14"
3	José Serra (ESP)	+ 15' 49"
4	Bernardo Ruiz (ESP)	+ 22' 02"
5	Alighiero Ridolfi (ITA)	s.t.
6	Umberto Drei (ITA)	+ 23' 55"
7	Senén Mesa (ESP)	+ 23' 56"
8	Bernardo Capó (ESP)	+ 33' 25"
9	Antonio Gelabert (ESP)	+ 45' 14"
10	Jesús Loroño (ESP)	+ 51' 49"

== Stage 17 ==
4 September 1950 - Granada to Málaga, 183 km (114 mi)

Stage 17 result

Rank	Rider	Time
1	Umberto Drei (ITA)	6h 09' 23"
2	Francisco Expósito (ESP)	s.t.
3	Alighiero Ridolfi (ITA)	s.t.
4	Bernardo Ruiz (ESP)	s.t.
5	Antonio Gelabert (ESP)	s.t.
6	José Serra (ESP)	s.t.
7	Emilio Rodríguez (ESP)	s.t.
8	Manuel Rodríguez (ESP)	s.t.
9	Bernardo Capó (ESP)	s.t.
10	Andrés Trobat (ESP)	s.t.

General classification after Stage 17

Rank	Rider	Time
1	Emilio Rodríguez (ESP)	101h 43' 42"
2	Manuel Rodríguez (ESP)	+ 16' 14"
3	José Serra (ESP)	+ 18' 49"
4	Bernardo Ruiz (ESP)	+ 19' 18"
5	Alighiero Ridolfi (ITA)	+ 24' 02"
6	Umberto Drei (ITA)	+ 24' 55"
7	Senén Mesa (ESP)	+ 30' 57"
8	Bernardo Capó (ESP)	+ 35' 25"
9	Antonio Gelabert (ESP)	+ 47' 14"
10	Jesús Loroño (ESP)	+ 51' 49"

== Stage 18 ==
6 September 1950 - Málaga to Cádiz, 268 km (167 mi)

Stage 18 result

Rank	Rider	Time
1	Antonio Gelabert (ESP)	9h 31' 51"
2	Francisco Expósito (ESP)	s.t.
3	Matias Alemany (ESP)	s.t.
4	Luis Navarro (ESP)	s.t.
5	Andrés Trobat (ESP)	s.t.
6	Agustin Miro (ESP)	+ 10"
7	Rik Evens (BEL)	+ 5' 26"
8	Victorio García (ESP)	s.t.
9	Elias Walckiers (BEL)	s.t.
10	José Serra (ESP)	s.t.

General classification after Stage 18

Rank	Rider	Time
1	Emilio Rodríguez (ESP)	111h 22' 59"
2	Manuel Rodríguez (ESP)	+ 14' 14"
3	José Serra (ESP)	+ 16' 49"
4	Bernardo Ruiz (ESP)	+ 17' 23"
5	Alighiero Ridolfi (ITA)	+ 22' 02"
6	Umberto Drei (ITA)	+ 22' 55"
7	Senén Mesa (ESP)	+ 23' 57"
8	Bernardo Capó (ESP)	+ 34' 44"
9	Antonio Gelabert (ESP)	+ 38' 48"
10	Francisco Expósito (ESP)	+ 48' 01"

== Stage 19a ==
7 September 1950 - Cádiz to Jerez de la Frontera, 56 km (35 mi) (ITT)

Stage 19a result

Rank	Rider	Time
1	Andrés Trobat (ESP)	1h 21' 08"
2	Emilio Rodríguez (ESP)	+ 31"
3	Manuel Rodríguez (ESP)	s.t.
4	Antonio Gelabert (ESP)	+ 50"
5	Bernardo Ruiz (ESP)	+ 58"
6	Umberto Drei (ITA)	s.t.
7	Senén Mesa (ESP)	s.t.
8	Bernardo Capó (ESP)	+ 3' 05"
9	José Serra (ESP)	+ 3' 30"
10	Antonio Sánchez (ESP)	+ 3' 46"

== Stage 19b ==
7 September 1950 - Jerez de la Frontera to Seville, 100 km (62 mi)

Stage 19b result

Rank	Rider	Time
1	José Serra (ESP)	2h 31' 08"
2	Bernardo Ruiz (ESP)	+ 3' 59"
3	Victorio García (ESP)	s.t.
4	Alighiero Ridolfi (ITA)	s.t.
5	Elias Walckiers (BEL)	s.t.
6	Mateo Coll Bover (ESP)	s.t.
7	Rik Evens (BEL)	s.t.
8	Umberto Drei (ITA)	s.t.
9	Emilio Rodríguez (ESP)	s.t.
10	Manuel Rodríguez (ESP)	s.t.

General classification after Stage 19b

Rank	Rider	Time
1	Emilio Rodríguez (ESP)	115h 19' 38"
2	Manuel Rodríguez (ESP)	+ 14' 21"
3	José Serra (ESP)	+ 14' 56"
4	Bernardo Ruiz (ESP)	+ 17' 57"
5	Umberto Drei (ITA)	+ 24' 23"
6	Alighiero Ridolfi (ITA)	+ 26' 57"
7	Senén Mesa (ESP)	+ 30' 25"
8	Bernardo Capó (ESP)	+ 36' 25"
9	Antonio Gelabert (ESP)	+ 45' 15"
10	Jesús Loroño (ESP)	+ 59' 17"

== Stage 20 ==
8 September 1950 - Seville to Mérida, 200 km (120 mi)

Stage 20 result

Rank	Rider	Time
1	Victorio García (ESP)	6h 48' 09"
2	Emilio Rodríguez (ESP)	s.t.
3	Angel Bruna (ESP)	s.t.
4	Agustin Miro (ESP)	s.t.
5	Manuel Rodríguez (ESP)	s.t.
6	Luis Sanchez Huergo (ESP)	s.t.
7	Antonio Gelabert (ESP)	s.t.
8	Umberto Drei (ITA)	s.t.
9	Gonzalo Fuertes (ESP)	s.t.
10	Francisco Expósito (ESP)	s.t.

General classification after Stage 20

Rank	Rider	Time
1	Emilio Rodríguez (ESP)	122h 07' 47"
2	Manuel Rodríguez (ESP)	+ 14' 21"
3	José Serra (ESP)	+ 14' 56"
4	Bernardo Ruiz (ESP)	+ 17' 13"
5	Umberto Drei (ITA)	+ 24' 23"
6	Senén Mesa (ESP)	+ 30' 25"
7	Bernardo Capó (ESP)	+ 36' 25"
8	Alighiero Ridolfi (ITA)	+ 45' 08"
9	Antonio Gelabert (ESP)	+ 45' 15"
10	Jesús Loroño (ESP)	+ 59' 21"

== Stage 21 ==
9 September 1950 - Mérida to Talavera de la Reina, 228 km (142 mi)

Stage 21 result

Rank	Rider	Time
1	Bernardo Capó (ESP)	8h 24' 20"
2	Rik Evens (BEL)	s.t.
3	Elias Walckiers (BEL)	s.t.
4	Luis Sanchez Huergo (ESP)	s.t.
5	Victorio García (ESP)	s.t.
6	Angel Bruna (ESP)	s.t.
7	Francisco Expósito (ESP)	s.t.
8	Alighiero Ridolfi (ITA)	s.t.
9	Mateo Coll Bover (ESP)	s.t.
10	Umberto Drei (ITA)	s.t.

General classification after Stage 21

Rank	Rider	Time
1	Emilio Rodríguez (ESP)	130h 32' 17"
2	Manuel Rodríguez (ESP)	+ 11' 18"
3	José Serra (ESP)	+ 14' 51"
4	Bernardo Ruiz (ESP)	+ 17' 52"
5	Umberto Drei (ITA)	+ 24' 19"
6	Senén Mesa (ESP)	+ 30' 20"
7	Bernardo Capó (ESP)	+ 35' 15"
8	Alighiero Ridolfi (ITA)	+ 45' 03"
9	Antonio Gelabert (ESP)	+ 45' 10"
10	Jesús Loroño (ESP)	+ 59' 12"

== Stage 22 ==
10 September 1950 - Talavera de la Reina to Madrid, 117 km (73 mi)

Stage 22 result

Rank	Rider	Time
1	Emilio Rodríguez (ESP)	4h 13' 07"
2	Angel Bruna (ESP)	s.t.
3	Andrés Trobat (ESP)	s.t.
4	Victorio García (ESP)	s.t.
5	Umberto Drei (ITA)	s.t.
6	Gonzalo Fuertes (ESP)	s.t.
7	Elias Walckiers (BEL)	s.t.
8	Mateo Coll Bover (ESP)	s.t.
9	Guillermo Peregrina (ESP)	s.t.
10	Rik Evens (BEL)	s.t.

General classification after Stage 22

Rank	Rider	Time
1	Emilio Rodríguez (ESP)	134h 49' 19"
2	Manuel Rodríguez (ESP)	+ 15' 30"
3	José Serra (ESP)	+ 16' 05"
4	Bernardo Ruiz (ESP)	+ 19' 16"
5	Umberto Drei (ITA)	+ 25' 23"
6	Senén Mesa (ESP)	+ 31' 44"
7	Bernardo Capó (ESP)	+ 36' 29"
8	Alighiero Ridolfi (ITA)	+ 46' 38"
9	Antonio Gelabert (ESP)	+ 47' 03"
10	Jesús Loroño (ESP)	+ 59' 26"
