= List of teams and cyclists in the 1948 Vuelta a España =

For the 1948 Vuelta a España, the field consisted of 54 riders; 26 finished the race.

== By rider ==
Legend
No.	Starting number worn by the rider during the Vuelta
Pos.	Position in the general classification
DNF	Denotes a rider who did not finish

No.	Name	Nationality	Team	Pos.	Ref
1	Jean Bogaerts	Belgium	Bicicletas Cil	26	
2	Daniel Taillieu	Belgium	Bicicletas Cil	DNF	
3	Jean Lesage	Belgium	Bicicletas Cil	12	
4	Jean Breuer	Belgium	Bicicletas Cil	19	
5	Frans Gielen	Belgium	Bicicletas Cil	25	
6	Félix Adriano	Italy	Hojas Afeitar Iberia	DNF	
7	Francis Fricker	France	Hojas Afeitar Iberia	DNF	
8	Antoine Giauna	France	Hojas Afeitar Iberia	10	
9	Émile Rol	France	Hojas Afeitar Iberia	DNF	
30	Miguel Fombellida	Spain	Hojas Afeitar Iberia	DNF	
11	Celestino Camilla	Italy	Pedal Notario	DNF	
12	Dominique Zanti	Italy	Pedal Notario	DNF	
13	Saverio Montuori	Italy	Pedal Notario	DNF	
14	Roberto Vercellone	Italy	Pedal Notario	DNF	
15	Natalino Arata	Italy	Pedal Notario	23	
17	Victorio Ruiz	Spain	Agris Radio	11	
18	Julián Aguirrezabal	Spain	Agris Radio	DNF	
19	Pastor Rodríguez	Spain	Agris Radio	DNF	
20	Manuel Rodríguez	Spain	Agris Radio	7	
43	Joaquín Jiménez	Spain	Agris Radio	24	
21	Dalmacio Langarica	Spain	Insecticidas ZZ	4	
22	Antonio Martín	Spain	Insecticidas ZZ	DNF	
23	Francisco Masip	Spain	Insecticidas ZZ	DNF	
24	Félix Vidaurreta	Spain	Insecticidas ZZ	DNF	
25	Jesús Loroño	Spain	Insecticidas ZZ	21	
26	Bernardo Capó	Spain	Veloz Sport Balear	3	
27	Miguel Gual	Spain	Veloz Sport Balear	9	
28	Antonio Gelabert	Spain	Veloz Sport Balear	17	
29	Alejandro Fombellida	Spain	Veloz Sport Balear	DNF	
31	Gabriel Palmer	Spain	Veloz Sport Balear	DNF	
16	Julián Berrendero	Spain	Casa Galindo	DNF	
32	Joaquín Olmos	Spain	Casa Galindo	DNF	
33	Manuel Costa	Spain	Casa Galindo	6	
34	Juan Gimeno	Spain	Casa Galindo	13	
35	Agustín Miró	Spain	Casa Galindo	16	
36	Bernardo Ruiz	Spain	U.D. Sans-Portaminas Alas Color	1	
37	Emilio Rodríguez	Spain	U.D. Sans-Portaminas Alas Color	2	
38	José Serra	Spain	U.D. Sans-Portaminas Alas Color	15	
39	José Pérez	Spain	U.D. Sans-Portaminas Alas Color	8	
40	Ricardo Ferrandiz	Spain	U.D. Sans-Portaminas Alas Color	14	
41	Gabriel Saura	Spain	Digame	DNF	
42	Pedro Font	Spain	Digame	18	
55	Enrique Catalá	Spain	Digame	DNF	
44	José Lahoz	Spain	Digame	DNF	
45	José Escolano	Spain	Digame	DNF	
46	Andrés Morán	Spain	Bicicletas Gaitan	22	
47	Senén Mesa	Spain	Bicicletas Gaitan	5	
48	Senén Blanco	Spain	Bicicletas Gaitan	20	
49	José López Gándara	Spain	Bicicletas Gaitan	DNF	
50	Guillermo Peregrina	Spain	Bicicletas Gaitan	DNF	
51	Cristóbal García	Spain	Independent	DNF	
52	Tomás Calvo	Spain	Independent	DNF	
53	Mateo Coll Bover	Spain	Independent	DNF	
54	José Marco	Spain	Independent	DNF	
