= Luis Navarro =

Luis Navarro may refer to:

- Luis Navarro (writer) (1788–1846), Spanish Dominican and writer
- Luis Navarro (priest) (1844–1911), Spanish parish priest of the Canyamelar Church
- Luis Navarro Ocampo (born 1868), Chilean politician
- Luis Navarro (politician) (1897–1928), Mexican military officer and politician
- Luis Navarro Garnica (1904–1995), Spanish military officer and president of Atlético Madrid
- Luis Navarro (cyclist) (1929–2011), Spanish cyclist
- Luis Navarro (professor) (1934–2023), Spanish Catalan university professor and cultural promoter
- Luis Navarro (athlete) (1935–2015), Venezuelan athlete
- Luis Navarro (photographer) (born 1938), Chilean photographer
- Luis Navarro (footballer) (1939–2012), Spanish footballer
- Luis Navarro Lucas (born 1947), Spanish agricultural engineer and researcher
- Luis Navarro (missionary) (1950–1981), Guatemalan Catholic missionary
- Luis Navarro Marfá (born 1954), Spanish priest, lawyer, and professor
