= GP Pascuas =

Cycling race in Spain

Race details
- Date: March-April
- Region: Pamplona, Spain
- Discipline: Road race
- Type: One-day race

History
- First edition: 1924
- Editions: 52
- Final edition: 1983
- First winner: Remigio Loroño (ESP)
- Most wins: Domingo Perurena (ESP) (6 wins)
- Final winner: Alfonso Gutiérrez (ESP)

GP Pascuas was a road bicycle race held annually in Pamplona, Spain. It was held from 1924 until 1983.

== Winners ==
Year	Winner	Second	Third
1924	(Spain) Remigio Loroño	(Spain) Segundo Barruetabena	(Spain) José Saura
1925	(Spain) Domingo Gutiérrez	(Spain) Cesareo Sarduy	(Spain) Salvador Artaza
1926	(Spain) Jesús García	(Spain) Segundo Barruetabena	(Spain) Cesareo Sarduy
1927	(Spain) Ricardo Montero	(Belgium) Leon Devos	(Belgium) René Vandenberghe
1928	(Spain) Ricardo Montero	(Spain) Manuel López	(Spain) Enrique Aguirre
1929	(Spain) Francisco Cepeda	(Spain) Luciano Montero	(Spain) Jesús Dermit
1930	(Spain) Vicente Trueba	(Spain) José Garcia	(Spain) Valeriano Riera
1931–1934 No race
1935	(France) Paul Larrouy	(Spain) Severiano Hevia	(Spain) Antonio Escuriet
1936	(Spain) Antonio Escuriet	(Spain) Jesús Dermit	(Spain) Fermín Apalategui
1937–1939 No race
1940	(Spain) Federico Ezquerra	(Spain) Fermín Trueba	(Spain) Francisco Goenaga
1941	(Spain) José Lahoz	(Spain) Martín Abadía	(Spain) Benito Cabestreros
1942	(Spain) Ignacio Orbaiceta	(Spain) Jesús Dermit	(Spain) Benito Cabestreros
1943	(Spain) José Lahoz	(Spain) Benito Cabestreros	(Spain) Ignacio Orbaiceta
1944	(Spain) Ignacio Orbaiceta	(Spain) Vicente Carretero	(Spain) José Campos
1945	(Spain) Ignacio Orbaiceta	(Spain) Joaquín Olmos	(Spain) Cipriano Aguirrezabal
1946	(Spain) Dalmacio Langarica	(Spain) Miguel Poblet	(Spain) José Escolano
1947	(Spain) Miguel Gual	(Spain) Bernardo Capó	(Spain) Antonio Gelabert
1948	(Spain) Miguel Poblet	(Spain) Dalmacio Langarica	(Spain) Antonio Martín
1949	(Spain) José Serra	(Spain) Hortensio Vidaurreta	(Spain) Vicente Marín
1950	(Argentina) Jorge Vallmitjana	(Spain) Victorio García	(Spain) Victorio Ruíz
1951	(Spain) Alberto Sant	(Spain) Jaime Coscolluela	(Spain) Jaime Montaña
1952	(Spain) Antonio Gelabert	(Spain) Vicente Iturat	(Spain) Julián Aguirrezabal
1953	(Spain) Mariano Corrales	(Spain) Vicente Iturat	(Spain) Pere Sant i Alentà
1954	(Spain) Andrés Trobat	(Spain) Bernardo Ruiz	(Spain) Manuel Rodríguez Barros
1955	(Spain) Vicente Iturat	(Spain) Gabriel Company	(Spain) Emilio Rodríguez Barros
1956	(Spain) Miguel Bover	(Spain) Bernardo Ruiz	(Spain) José Escolano
1957	(Spain) René Marigil	(France) Robert Gibanel	(Spain) Carmelo Morales Erostarbe
1958	(Spain) Bernardo Ruiz	(Spain) Jesús Galdeano	(Spain) Francisco Moreno
1959	(Spain) Antonio Bertrán	(Spain) Carmelo Morales Erostarbe	(Spain) Miguel Pacheco
1960. No se disputó
1961	(Spain) Vicente Iturat	(Spain) Roberto Morales Erostarbe	(Spain) Juan Manuel Menéndez Gómez
1962	(Spain) José Segu	(Spain) José Pérez-Francés	(Spain) Antón Barrutia
1963	(Spain) Juan José Sagarduy	(Spain) Roberto Morales Erostarbe	(Spain) José Pérez-Francés
1964	(Spain) Luis Otaño	(Spain) Antonio Barrutia	(Spain) Carlos Echeverría
1965	(Spain) Carlos Echeverría	(Spain) Eusebio Vélez	(Spain) Antonio Blanco Martínez
1966	(Spain) Juan José Sagarduy	(Spain) Domingo Perurena	(Spain) Fulgencio Sánchez Montesinos
1967	(Spain) José Antonio Momeñe	(Spain) Carlos Echeverría	(Spain) José Maria Azcue
1968	(Spain) Domingo Perurena	(Spain) Jaime Alomar	(Spain) José Pérez-Francés
1969	(Spain) Domingo Perurena	(Spain) Carlos Echeverría	(Spain) José Manuel Lasa Urquía
1970	(Spain) Luis Zubero	(Spain) Antonio Gómez del Moral	(Spain) Domingo Perurena
1971	(Spain) Domingo Perurena	(Spain) José Manuel López Rodríguez	(Spain) Ramón Sáez Marzo
1972	(Spain) Santiago Lazcano	(Spain) José Luis Abilleira	(Spain) Francisco Galdós
1973	(Spain) Jesús Esperanza	(Spain) José Grande	(Spain) Luis Balagué Carreño
1974	(Spain) Domingo Perurena	(Spain) Miguel María Lasa	(Spain) Francisco Javier Elorriaga
1975	(Spain) Miguel María Lasa	(Spain) Domingo Perurena	(France) Jean-Jacques Fussien
1976	(Spain) Domingo Perurena	(Spain) Agustín Tamames	(Spain) Francisco Javier Elorriaga
1977	(Spain) José Antonio González Linares	(Spain) Juan Pujol Pagés	(Spain) Antonio Menéndez
1978	(Spain) Domingo Perurena	(Italy) Daniele Tinchella	(Spain) Francisco Javier Elorriaga
1979	(Spain) Manuel Esparza	(Spain) Jesús Suárez Cuevas	(Spain) Miguel María Lasa
1980	(Spain) Enrique Martínez Heredia	(Spain) Jesús Suárez Cuevas	(Spain) Miguel María Lasa
1981	(Spain) Juan Fernández	(Spain) Eulalio García	(Spain) José Luis Viejo
1982	(Spain) Faustino Rupérez	(Spain) Eulalio García	(Spain) Federico Echave
1983	(Spain) Alfonso Gutiérrez	(Spain) Federico Echave	(Spain) Modesto Urrutibeazcoa Valencia
