= Miguel Poblet =

Spanish cyclist

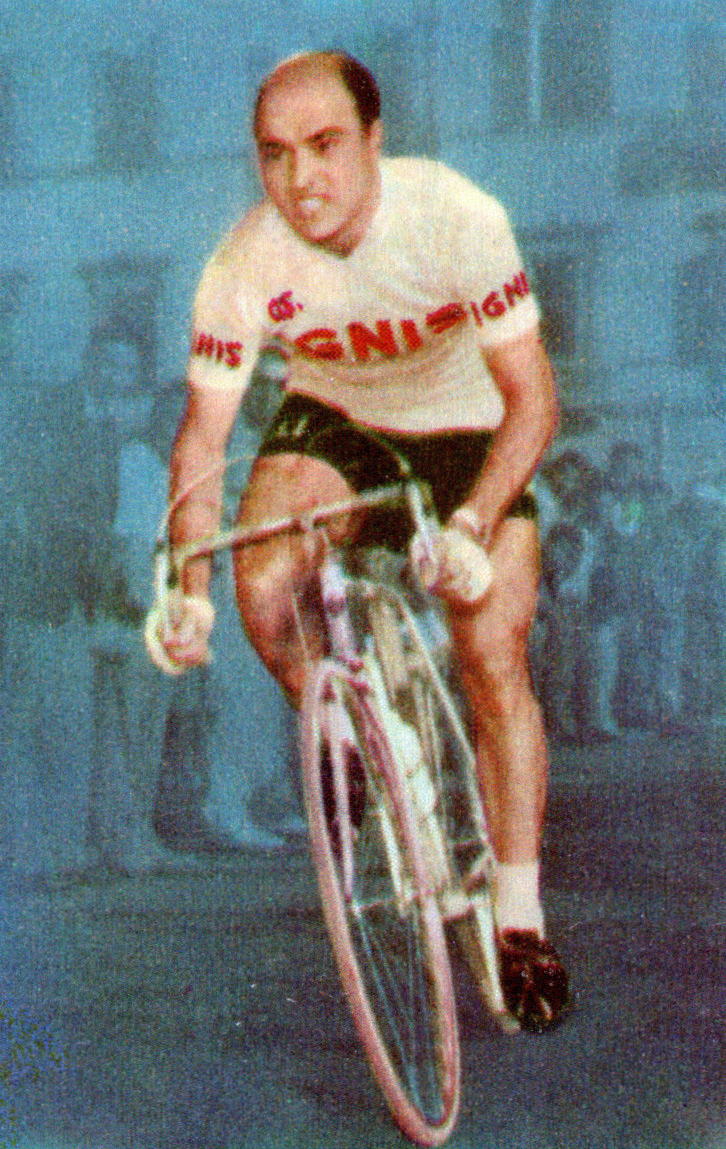

Personal information
- Full name: Miguel Poblet Orriols
- Born: 18 March 1928 Montcada i Reixac, Spain
- Died: 6 April 2013 (aged 85) Barcelona, Spain

Cycling career
- Sport: Cycling
- Discipline: Road
- Role: Rider

Professional teams
- 1952: Minaco-Telefunken
- 1953–1954: La Perle-Hutchinson
- 1955: Splendid-d'Alessandro
- 1956: Faema-Guerra
- 1957–1958: Ignis-Doniselli
- 1959: Ignis-Frejus
- 1960–1961: Ignis
- 1962: Ignis-Moschettieri

Major wins
- Grand Tours Tour de France 3 individual stages (1955, 1956) Giro d'Italia Points classification (1958) 20 individual stages (1956–1961) Vuelta a España 3 individual stages (1956) Stage races Volta a Catalunya (1952, 1960) One-day races and Classics Milan–San Remo (1957, 1959)

Miguel Poblet Orriols (18 March 1928 – 6 April 2013) was a Spanish professional cyclist, who had over 200 professional victories from 1944 to 1962. He was the first Spanish rider to wear the yellow jersey in the Tour de France, and in 1956 he became the first of only three riders to win stages in the three Grand Tours in the same year. (The other two are Pierino Baffi and Alessandro Petacchi.) He won the Milan–San Remo classic race on two occasions and took 26 stage wins in the three Grand Tours. His twenty-stage wins in the Giro d'Italia makes him the third most successful foreign rider in the "Giro" behind Eddy Merckx (25) and Roger De Vlaeminck (22). Poblet was of short stature who had great power, he was the first Spanish rider to be a specialist in one day races in an age when Spain only produced climbers. He had a lightning fast sprint, but could also climb well, taking the Spanish Mountain championships on three occasions and the mountainous Volta a Catalunya twice. His nickname whilst riding was "La Flecha Amarilla" (the Yellow Arrow) due to the yellow kit of his Ignis team.

== Biography ==
Poblet was born at Montcada i Reixac in the northern suburbs of Barcelona, Catalonia, Spain. His father Enrique owned a bicycle shop in Barcelona and he encouraged his son to take up racing seriously at a young age and supplied him with all the necessary equipment. Despite turning professional in 1944, at the age of 16, Poblet’s career did not really take off internationally until 1955 when he was invited to be part of the Spanish team at the Tour de France; at that time the Tour invited national squads rather than trade teams. Poblet made an immediate effect at the Tour when he won the opening stage between Le Havre and Dieppe becoming the first Spaniard to wear the yellow jersey. He held onto the jersey in the afternoon Team time trial but lost it next day to Dutchman Wout Wagtmans. However, Poblet had more glory at that year's Tour when he took the prestigious final stage into Paris at the Parc des Princes stadium.

Success at the 1955 Tour ensured an invitation to the 1956 Giro d’Italia where he took four stages, this followed three stage wins in the Vuelta a España, he took another Tour de France stage win that year between Angers and La Rochelle to complete a grand slam of stages in Grand Tours for 1956. Only Pierino Baffi and Alessandro Petacchi have been able to repeat this. By this time Poblet was riding for the Faema team led by Rik Van Looy but he left the team early in 1957 after being told he was not going to ride Milan–San Remo. He signed for the Italian squad Ignis and promptly won Milano–Torino for them; a week later he was victorious at Milan–San Remo. He stayed with the Ignis squad for the rest of his career.

Poblet prepared meticulously for Milan–San Remo, designing a training course in Catalonia similar to the Italian classics parcours with a big climb similar to the Turchino Pass followed by a series of smaller hills. He finished second in 1958 behind Van Looy and then won again in 1959 after breaking away from the peloton with 400 metres to go. He came close to winning Paris–Roubaix in 1958 coming second to Leon Van Daele and third in 1960 when Pino Cerami won. For 45 years, he was the only Spaniard ever to have got on the podium at the Roubaix Velodrome, until Juan Antonio Flecha took the third step in 2005 and second in 2007.

After retirement Poblet continued to live in the Barcelona area, in 2001 the local sports arena was named after him and more than 2000 people turned out to pay tribute to him. Poblet was awarded the Creu de Sant Jordi in December 2002, one of the highest civil distinctions in Catalonia. In 2004 he was a special guest of the Vuelta a España as it passed through Catalonia. He died on 6 April 2013 from kidney failure.

== Major results ==
1945
1st Trofeo Jaumendreu
3rd Overall Trofeo Masferrer

1st Stage 1

1946
2nd GP Pascuas
4th Overall Vuelta a Burgos

1st Stages 2 & 4

10th Trofeo Jaumendreu
1947
1st Overall Gran Premio Cataluña

1st Stages 2, 3, 5 & 7

1st Klasika Primavera
1st Trofeo Jaumendreu
5th Overall Volta a Catalunya

1st Stages 1b, 6 & 8

1948
1st Overall Gran Premio Cataluña

1st Stages 1b & 2

1st GP Pascuas
1st Stage 2 Vuelta a Levante
2nd Trofeo Jaumendreu
7th Overall Volta a Catalunya

1st Stages 7 & 8

1949
2nd Overall Volta a Catalunya

1st Stages 1, 3, 6 & 7

6th Overall Gran Premio Cataluña

1st Stages 2 & 5

1951
Volta a Catalunya

1st Stages 2 & 12

2nd Trofeo Masferrer
3rd Overall Vuelta a Castilla

1st Stages 1, 3, 4 & 9

1952
1st Overall Volta a Catalunya

1st Stages 1, 3 & 6

3rd Overall Vuelta a Castilla

1st Stages 1, 6, 9 & 10

1953
Volta a Catalunya

1st Stages 1 & 6

1954
1st Trofeo Masferrer
1st Stage 6 Vuelta a Asturias
3rd Overall Volta a Catalunya

1st Stages 6, 9, 10 & 11

3rd Overall Vuelta a Aragón

1st Stages 1, 4, 5, 8 & 9

4th GP Pascuas
9th Overall Gran Premio Ciclomotoristico
1955
1st Grand Prix du Midi Libre
Tour de France

1st Stages 1a & 22
Held after Stages 1a & 1b
Held after Stages 1a, 1b & 9

1st Stage 1 Vuelta a Andalucía
1st Stage 3 Euskal Bizikleta
2nd Critérium des As
5th Road race, National Road Championships
1956
1st Stage 8 Tour de France
Giro d'Italia

1st Stages 4, 9, 16 & 18

Vuelta a España

1st Stages 3, 5 & 6

4th Overall Volta a Catalunya

1st Stages 2, 6b, 8 & 9

6th Paris–Tours
1957
1st Milan–San Remo
1st Milano–Torino
Volta a Catalunya

1st Stages 1a & 8

2nd Overall Gran Premio Ciclomotoristico

1st Stages 6b, 7 & 8c

5th Trofeo Baracchi (with Francisco Masip)
6th Overall Giro d'Italia

1st Stages 3, 9, 10 & 18

7th Paris–Tours
10th Giro di Lombardia
1958
1st Stage 5b Paris–Nice
1st Stage 7 Volta a Catalunya
2nd Overall Gran Premio Ciclomotoristico

1st Stages 1, 5, 6b, 7a & 7b

2nd Milan–San Remo
2nd Paris–Roubaix
2nd Giro di Lombardia
2nd Milano–Torino
5th Road race, National Road Championships
5th Gran Premio di Lugano
6th Overall Giro d'Italia

1st Points classification
1st Stages 16, 19 & 20

10th Driedaagse van Antwerpen

1st Stage 1b

1959
1st Milan–San Remo
Volta a Catalunya

1st Stages 1, 6 & 9

1st Stage 8 Vuelta a Levante
3rd Giro di Lombardia
3rd Paris–Brussels
4th Road race, National Road Championships
4th Paris–Tours
5th Overall Gran Premio Ciclomotoristico

1st Stages 4 & 8b

6th Overall Giro d'Italia

1st Stages 6, 13 & 15

1960
1st Overall Volta a Catalunya

1st Stages 2, 3a (TTT), 4 & 6

1st Classica Sarda
1st Stage 2 Giro di Sardegna
Giro d'Italia

1st Stages 3, 7a (ITT) & 9b (ITT) (victory shared with Jacques Anquetil)

2nd Giro della Romagna
3rd Paris–Roubaix
6th Overall Gran Premio Ciclomotoristico

1st Mountains classification
1st Stages 2a, 5a & 6a

8th Milano–Torino
1961
Giro d'Italia

1st Stages 1, 2 & 21
Held after Stages 1–6

Vuelta a Levante

1st Stages 2, 3, 6 & 8

3rd Gran Premio Industria e Commercio di Prato

=== Grand Tour general classification results timeline ===
Grand Tour	1952	1953	1954	1955	1956	1957	1958	1959	1960	1961	1962
Vuelta a España	Race not held			DNF	DNF	—	—	—	—	—	—
Giro d'Italia	—	—	—	—	DNF	6	6	6	25	41	—
Tour de France	—	—	—	26	DNF	DNF	—	—	—	—	—

=== Classics results timeline ===
Monuments results timeline
Monument	1952	1953	1954	1955	1956	1957	1958	1959	1960	1961	1962
Milan–San Remo	—	—	—	—	—	1	2	1	26	39	—
Tour of Flanders	Did not contest during career										
Paris–Roubaix	—	85	40	32	—	26	2	37	3	—	—
Liège–Bastogne–Liège	Did not contest during career										
Giro di Lombardia	—	—	—	—	31	10	2	3	12	—	—

Legend
—	Did not compete
DNF	Did not finish
