= Subida a Arrate =

Race details
- Region: Basque Country, Spain
- Local name: Basque: Arrateko Igoera
- Discipline: Road race
- Type: One-day race

History
- First edition: 1941
- Editions: 43
- Final edition: 1986
- First winner: Pedro Zugasti (ESP)
- Most wins: Federico Bahamontes (ESP) (5 wins)
- Final winner: Iñaki Gastón (ESP)

The Subida a Arrate was a road bicycle race held annually in the Basque Country, Spain from 1941 until 1986. It then merged with the Gran Premio de la Bicicleta Eibarresa, which became the Euskal Bizikleta.

== Winners ==
Year	Winner	Second	Third
1941	(Spain) Pedro Zugasti	(Spain) Martín Mancisidor	(Spain) Agustín Uribe
1942	(Spain) Martín Mancisidor	(Spain) Martín Abadía	(Spain) Félix Vidaurreta García
1943	(Spain) Martín Mancisidor	(Spain) José Gandara	(Spain) Félix Vidaurreta García
1944	(Spain) Martín Mancisidor	(Spain) José Gandara	(Spain) Félix Vidaurreta García
1945	(Spain) José Gandara	(Spain) José Gutiérrez	(Spain) Fermín Trueba
1946	(Spain) Martín Mancisidor	(Spain) Sotero Lizarazu	(Spain) Miguel Lizarazu
1947	(Spain) Miguel Lizarazu	(Spain) Hortensio Vidaurreta	(Spain) Félix Vidaurreta García
1948	(Spain) Miguel Lizarazu	(Spain) Hortensio Vidaurreta	(Spain) Joaquim Filba
1949	(Spain) Jesús Loroño	(Spain) José Serra Gil	(Spain) Emilio Rodríguez Barros
1950	(Spain) Manuel Rodríguez Barros	(Spain) Julio San Emeterio Albascal	(Spain) Juan Espín
1951	(Spain) Manuel Rodríguez Barros	(Spain) Julián Aguirrezabal	(Spain) Jesús Loroño
1952	(Spain) Hortensio Vidaurreta	(Spain) Jesús Loroño	(Spain) Manuel Rodríguez Barros
1953	(Spain) Julián Aguirrezabal	(Spain) Jesús Loroño	(Spain) Cosme Barrutia
1954	(Spain) Óscar Elgezabal	(Spain) Antón Barrutia	(Spain) Julio San Emeterio Albascal
1955	(Spain) Antón Barrutia	(Spain) Fausto Iza	(Spain) Ponciano Arbelaiz
1956	(Spain) Antón Barrutia	(Spain) Antonio Gelabert Armengual	(Spain) Carmelo Morales Erostarbe
1957	(Spain) José Michelena	(Spain) Carmelo Morales Erostarbe	(Spain) Manuel Rodríguez Barros
1958	(Spain) Federico Bahamontes	(Spain) Benigno Aspuru	(Spain) Joan Bibiloni Frau
1959	(Spain) Federico Bahamontes	(Spain) Jesús Loroño	(Spain) Carmelo Morales Erostarbe
1960	(Spain) Federico Bahamontes	(France) Valentin Huot	(Spain) Jesús Loroño
1961	(Spain) Federico Bahamontes	(Spain) Ventura Díaz Arrey	(Spain) Jesús Loroño
1962	(Spain) Federico Bahamontes	(Spain) Julio Jiménez	(Spain) Esteban Martín Jiménez
1963	(Spain) Juan José Sagarduy	(Spain) Federico Bahamontes	(France) Jacques Anquetil
1964	(Spain) Joaquim Galera	(Spain) Francisco Gabica	(Spain) Eusebio Vélez
1965	(Spain) Julio Jiménez	(Spain) Federico Bahamontes	(Spain) Angelino Soler
1966	(France) Raymond Poulidor	(Spain) Eusebio Vélez	(Spain) Juan José Sagarduy
1967	(Spain) Eduardo Castelló	(Spain) Ventura Díaz Arrey	(Spain) Jaime Fullana Rosselló
1968	(France) Raymond Poulidor	(Spain) Domingo Fernández	(Spain) Eusebio Vélez
1969	(Spain) Domingo Fernández	(Spain) Eduardo Castelló	(Spain) Luis Ocaña
1970	(Spain) Joaquim Galera	(Spain) Eduardo Castelló	(Denmark) Leif Mortensen
1971	(Spain) Luis Ocaña	(Spain) Gabriel Mascaró	(Spain) Andrés Oliva Sánchez
1972	(Spain) Gonzalo Aja	(Spain) José Luis Abilleira	(Belgium) Herman Van Springel
1973	(Spain) Santiago Lazcano	(Denmark) Leif Mortensen	(Spain) Francisco Galdós
1974	(Spain) Pedro Torres	(Spain) Andrés Oliva Sánchez	(Spain) Gonzalo Aja
1975	(Spain) Francisco Galdós	(Spain) Luis Ocaña	(Spain) Santiago Lazcano
1976	No race		
1977	(Spain) Carlos Ocaña	(Spain) Ismael Lejarreta	(Spain) José Nazabal
1978	(Spain) Faustino Fernández	(Spain) Francisco Albelda	(Switzerland) Albert Zweifel
1979– 1980	No race		
1981	(Belgium) Johan De Muynck	(France) Mariano Martínez	(United Kingdom) Graham Jones
1982	(Spain) Ángel Arroyo	(Spain) Faustino Rupérez	(Spain) Julián Gorospe
1983	(Spain) Alberto Fernández	(Spain) Faustino Rupérez	(Spain) Antonio Coll
1984	(Republic of Ireland) Stephen Roche	(Spain) Iñaki Gastón	(Spain) Mariano Sánchez Martínez
1985	(Spain) Iñaki Gastón	(Spain) Ángel de las Heras	(Spain) Juan Tomás Martínez Gutiérrez
1986	(Spain) Iñaki Gastón	(Spain) Marino Lejarreta	(Spain) Laudelino Cubino
