= 1950 Volta a Catalunya =

Race details
- Dates: 17–24 September 1950
- Stages: 8
- Distance: 1,320 km (820.2 mi)
- Winning time: 39h 57' 59"

Results
	Winner	Antonio Gelabert (ESP)
	Second	José Serra Gil (ESP)
	Third	Francisco Masip (ESP)

The 1950 Volta a Catalunya was the 30th edition of the Volta a Catalunya cycle race and was held from 17 September to 24 September 1950. The race started in Montjuïc and finished in Barcelona. The race was won by Antonio Gelabert.

== General classification ==
Final general classification

Rank	Rider	Time
1	Antonio Gelabert (ESP)	39h 57' 59"
2	José Serra Gil (ESP)	+ 3' 29"
3	Francisco Masip (ESP)	+ 4' 04"
4	Raoul Rémy (FRA)	+ 4' 46"
5	Bernardo Ruiz (ESP)	+ 5' 40"
6	Danilo Barozzi (ITA)	+ 7' 42"
7	Franco Fanti (ITA)	+ 12' 02"
8	Armando Peverelli (ITA)	+ 12' 09"
9	Dalmacio Langarica (ESP)	+ 17' 13"
10	Andrés Trobat (ESP)	+ 19' 26"
