= Trofeo Masferrer =

Race details
- Region: Catalonia, Spain
- Discipline: Road race
- Type: One-day race

History
- First edition: 1932
- Editions: 59
- Final edition: 1994
- First winner: Mariano Cañardo (ESP)
- Most wins: Txomin Perurena (ESP) (3 wins)
- Final winner: Ángel Edo (ESP)

Trofeo Masferrer was a road bicycle race held annually in Catalonia, Spain from 1932 until 1994.

== Winners ==
Year	Winner	Second	Third
1932	(Spain) Mariano Cañardo	(Spain) Josep Campamà	(Spain) Ricardo Ferrando
1933	(Spain) Mariano Cañardo	(Spain) Isidre Figueras	(Spain) Antonio Escuriet
1934	(Spain) Isidre Figueras	(Spain) José Nicolau	(Spain) Enrique Cortés
1935	(Italy) Luigi Ferrando	(Spain) Antonio Destrieux	(Spain) Vicente Trueba
1936	(Spain) Antonio Prior	(Spain) Mariano Cañardo	(Spain) Juan Mayol
1940	(Spain) Antonio Andrés Sancho	(Spain) Juan Gimeno	(Spain) Fernando Murcia
1941	(Spain) Fernando Murcia	(Spain) Antonio Andrés Sancho	(Spain) Delio Rodríguez
1942	(Spain) Fernando Murcia	(Spain) Martin Mancisidor	(Spain) Antonio Andrés Sancho
1943	(Spain) Julián Berrendero	(Spain) Antonio Andrés Sancho	(Spain) Delio Rodríguez
1944	(Spain) Antonio Andrés Sancho	(Spain) Martín Mancisidor	(Spain) Fernando Murcia
1945	(Spain) Enric Armengol		
1946	(Spain) Miguel Gual	(Spain) Victorio Ruiz	(Spain) José Escolano
1947	(Spain) Miguel Gual	(Spain) Dalmacio Langarica	(Spain) Joaquín Olmos
1948	No race		
1949	(Spain) Miguel Bover	(Spain) Emilio Rodríguez	(Spain) Bernardo Ruiz
1950	(Spain) Francisco Masip Llop	(Spain) José Vidal Porcar	(Spain) Antonio Gelabert
1951	(Spain) Manuel Rodríguez Barros	(Spain) Miguel Poblet	(Spain) Bernardo Ruiz
1952	(Spain) Francisco Alomar	(Spain) Bernardo Capó	(Spain) Joan Escolà
1953	(Spain) Hortensio Vidaurreta	(Spain) Vicente Iturat	(Spain) Bernardo Ruiz
1954	(Spain) Miguel Poblet	(Spain) Miguel Bover	(Spain) Manuel Rodríguez Barros
1955	(Spain) Gabriel Company	(Spain) Vicente Iturat	(Spain) Francisco Masip Llop
1956	(Spain) Francisco Masip Llop	(Spain) Antonio Bertrán	(Spain) Juan Campillo
1957	(Spain) Vicente Iturat	(Spain) Juan Crespo	(Spain) Francisco Moreno Martínez
1958	(Spain) Juan Crespo	(Spain) Gabriel Company	(Spain) Fernando Manzaneque
1959	(Spain) Gabriel Company	(Spain) Antonio Karmany	(Spain) Miguel Pacheco
1960	(Spain) Francisco Moreno Martínez	(Spain) Gabriel Mas	(Spain) Anicet Utset
1961– 1962	No race		
1963	(Belgium) Adolf de Waele	(Spain) Sebastián Elorza	(Spain) Ramón Mendiburu
1964	(Spain) Jaime Alomar	(Spain) Antonio Gómez del Moral	(Spain) Eusebio Vélez
1965	(Spain) Antonio Bertrán	(Spain) Francesc Tortellà Rebassa	(Spain) Rafael Carrasco Guerra
1966	(Spain) Manuel Martín Piñera	(Spain) Esteban Martín Jiménez	(Spain) José Manuel Lasa Urquía
1967	(Spain) Jaime Alomar	(Spain) José Pérez Francés	(Spain) Txomin Perurena
1968	(Italy) Dino Zandegù	(France) José Samyn	(Italy) Bruno Mealli
1969	(Italy) Dino Zandegù	(Spain) Antonio Gómez del Moral	(Italy) Cipriano Chemello
1970	(Spain) Ramón Sáez	(Italy) Franco Bitossi	(Belgium) Marc Sohet
1971	(Spain) Txomin Perurena	(Spain) Ramón Sáez	(Belgium) Marc Sohet
1972	(Spain) Francisco Galdós	(Spain) Santiago Lazcano	(Spain) José Luis Abilleira
1973	(Spain) Javier Francisco Elorriaga	(Spain) José Gómez Lucas	(Spain) Germán Martín Sáez
1974	(Spain) Txomin Perurena	(Spain) Andrés Oliva Sánchez	(Spain) Javier Francisco Elorriaga
1975	(Spain) Txomin Perurena	(Spain) Javier Francisco Elorriaga	(Belgium) Eddy Peelman
1976	(Spain) Félix Suárez Colomo	(Switzerland) Josef Fuchs	(Spain) Custodio Mazuela Castillo
1977	(Spain) José Luis Viejo	(Spain) José Manuel García Rodríguez	(Spain) Pedro Vilardebó
1978	(Spain) Miguel Mari Lasa	(Spain) Jesús Suárez Cueva	(Spain) Pedro Torres Cruces
1979	(France) Antoine Gutierrez	(Spain) Rafael Ladrón de Guevara	(Spain) Salvador Gálvez Massó
1980	(Spain) Juan Martín Ocaña	(Spain) Lorenzo Vidal	(Spain) Jesús Suárez Cueva
1981	(Switzerland) Daniel Gisiger	(Spain) Vicente Belda	(Spain) José Luis Rodríguez Inguanzo
1982	(Spain) Pedro Muñoz	(Spain) Antonio Coll	(Spain) Vicent Belda
1983	(Spain) Julián Gorospe	(Spain) Angel Ocaña	(Spain) Miguel Ángel Iglesias
1984	(Spain) Alberto Fernández Blanco	(Spain) Jesús Suárez Cueva	(Spain) Miguel Ángel Iglesias
1985	(Belgium) Noël Dejonckheere	(Spain) Alfonso Gutiérrez	(Spain) Jesús Suárez Cueva
1986	(Spain) Antonio Esparza	(Belgium) Noël Dejonckheere	(Spain) José Luis Laguía
1987	(Spain) Roberto Córdoba	(Spain) Rubén Gorospe	(Netherlands) Mathieu Hermans
1988	(Netherlands) Mathieu Hermans	(Spain) Antonio Esparza	(Spain) Miguel Ángel Iglesias
1989	(Spain) Casimiro Moreda	(Spain) Marino Alonso Monje	(Colombia) Álvaro Mejía
1990	(Spain) Enrique Aja	(Australia) Neil Stephens	(Colombia) Edgar Corredor
1991	(United Kingdom) Malcolm Elliott	(Portugal) Américo Silva Neves	(Colombia) Julio César Ortegón Luque
1992	(Italy) Mario Manzoni	(Netherlands) Mathieu Hermans	(Denmark) Kenneth Weltz
1993	(Spain) José Rodríguez García	(Spain) Alfonso Gutiérrez	(Russia) Asiat Saitov
1994	(Spain) Ángel Edo	(Russia) Asiat Saitov	(Italy) Davide Bramati
