= 1950 Vuelta a España =

Race details
- Dates: 17 August – 10 September
- Stages: 22
- Distance: 3,984 km (2,476 mi)
- Winning time: 134h 49' 19"

Results
| Jersey awarded to the overall winner | Winner | Emilio Rodríguez (ESP) |
| | Second | Manolo Rodríguez (ESP) |
| | Third | José Serra (ESP) |
| | Mountains | Emilio Rodríguez (ESP) |

The 9th Vuelta a España (Tour of Spain), a long-distance bicycle stage race and one of the three grand tours, was held from 17 August to 10 September 1950. It consisted of 22 stages covering a total of 3,984 km (2,476 mi), and was won by Emilio Rodríguez. Rodríguez also won the mountains classification.

== Route ==
List of stages
| Stage | Date | Course | Distance | Type | Winner |
|---|---|---|---|---|---|
| 1 | 17 August | Madrid to Valladolid | 190 km (118 mi) | | Omer Braeckeveldt (BEL) |
| 2 | 18 August | Valladolid to León | 133 km (83 mi) | | Rik Evens (BEL) |
| 3 | 19 August | León to Gijón | 148 km (92 mi) | | Emilio Rodríguez (ESP) |
| 4a | 20 August | Gijón to Torrelavega | 167 km (104 mi) | | Agustín Miró (ESP) |
| 4b | 20 August | Torrelavega to Santander | 78 km (48 mi) | | Emilio Rodríguez (ESP) |
| 5 | 21 August | Santander to Bilbao | 177 km (110 mi) | | Antonio Gelabert (ESP) |
| 6 | 22 August | Bilbao to Irun | 240 km (149 mi) | | Emilio Rodríguez (ESP) |
| 7 | 24 August | Irun to Pamplona | 109 km (68 mi) | | Emilio Rodríguez (ESP) |
| 8a | 25 August | Pamplona to Tudela | 90 km (56 mi) | Individual time trial | Bernardo Capó (ESP) |
| 8b | 25 August | Tudela to Zaragoza | 176 km (109 mi) | | Bernardo Ruiz (ESP) |
| 9 | 26 August | Zaragoza to Lleida | 144 km (89 mi) | | Umberto Drei (ITA) |
| 10 | 27 August | Lleida to Barcelona | 167 km (104 mi) | | José Serra (ESP) |
| 11 | 29 August | Barcelona to Tarragona | 150 km (93 mi) | | Rik Evens (BEL) |
| 12 | 30 August | Tarragona to Castellón | 194 km (121 mi) | | Luis Navarro (ESP) |
| 13 | 31 August | Castellón to Valencia | 65 km (40 mi) | Individual time trial | Antonio Sánchez Belando (ESP) |
| 14 | 1 September | Valencia to Murcia | 265 km (165 mi) | | Umberto Drei (ITA) |
| 15 | 2 September | Murcia to Lorca | 117 km (73 mi) | | Umberto Drei (ITA) |
| 16 | 3 September | Lorca to Granada | 222 km (138 mi) | | Alighiero Ridolfi (ITA) |
| 17 | 4 September | Granada to Málaga | 183 km (114 mi) | | Umberto Drei (ITA) |
| 18 | 6 September | Málaga to Cádiz | 268 km (167 mi) | | Antonio Gelabert (ESP) |
| 19a | 7 September | Cádiz to Jerez de la Frontera | 56 km (35 mi) | Individual time trial | Andrés Trobat (ESP) |
| 19b | 7 September | Jerez de la Frontera to Seville | 100 km (62 mi) | | José Serra (ESP) |
| 20 | 8 September | Seville to Mérida | 200 km (124 mi) | | Victorio García (ESP) |
| 21 | 9 September | Mérida to Talavera de la Reina | 228 km (142 mi) | | Bernardo Capó (ESP) |
| 22 | 10 September | Talavera de la Reina to Madrid | 117 km (73 mi) | | Emilio Rodríguez (ESP) |
| | Total | | 3,984 km (2,476 mi) | | |

== Results ==
=== Final General Classification ===
| Rank | Rider | Team | Time |
|---|---|---|---|
| 1 | (Spain) Emilio Rodríguez | | 134h 49' 19" |
| 2 | (Spain) Manolo Rodríguez | | + 15' 30" |
| 3 | (Spain) José Serra | | + 16' 05" |
| 4 | (Spain) Bernardo Ruiz | | + 19' 16" |
| 5 | (Italy) Umberto Drei | | + 25' 23" |
| 6 | (Spain) Senen Mesa | | + 31' 44" |
| 7 | (Spain) Bernardo Capo | | + 36' 29" |
| 8 | (Italy) Alighiero Ridolfi | | + 46' 38" |
| 9 | (Spain) Antonio Gelabert | | + 47' 03" |
| 10 | (Spain) Jesús Loroño | | + 1h 00' 26" |
| 11 | (Spain) Francisco Exposito | | |
| 12 | (Spain) Andrés Trobat | | |
| 13 | (Spain) Luis Sanchez | | |
| 14 | (Belgium) Rik Evens | | |
| 15 | (Spain) Victorio Garcia | | |
| 16 | (Spain) Martin Mancisidor | | |
| 17 | (Spain) Agustin Miro | | |
| 18 | (Spain) Senen Blanco | | |
| 19 | (Spain) Angel Bruna | | |
| 20 | (Spain) Mateo Coll Bover | | |
| 21 | (Spain) Antonio Sanchez | | |
| 22 | (Spain) Matias Alemany | | |
| 23 | (Spain) Luis Navarro | | |
| 24 | (Belgium) Elias Walckiers | | |
| 25 | (Spain) Guillermo Peregrina | | |
