= 1952 Volta a Catalunya =

Race details
- Dates: 7–14 September 1952
- Stages: 9
- Distance: 1,390 km (863.7 mi)
- Winning time: 41h 51' 51"

Results
	Winner	Miguel Poblet (ESP)
	Second	Adolfo Grosso (ITA)
	Third	José Serra Gil (ESP)

The 1952 Volta a Catalunya was the 32nd edition of the Volta a Catalunya cycle race and was held from 7 September to 14 September 1952. The race started in Montjuïc and finished in Barcelona. The race was won by Miguel Poblet.

== General classification ==
Final general classification

Rank	Rider	Time
1	Miguel Poblet (ESP)	41h 51' 51"
2	Adolfo Grosso (ITA)	+ 1' 44"
3	José Serra Gil (ESP)	+ 5' 58"
4	Isidoor De Ryck (BEL)	+ 6' 33"
5	Miguel Gual (ESP)	+ 6' 34"
6	Francisco Masip (ESP)	+ 8' 05"
7	Primo Volpi (ITA)	+ 8' 22"
8	Bernardo Ruiz (ESP)	+ 10' 11"
9	Andrés Trobat (ESP)	+ 11' 11"
10	Alfons Van den Brande (BEL)	+ 11' 39"
