= Luis Navarro (cyclist) =

Spanish cyclist

Personal information
- Full name: Luis Navarro Amorós
- Born: 3 January 1929 Novelda, Alicante, Venezuela
- Died: 15 May 2011 (aged 82) Spain

Cycling career
- Sport: Cycling
- Discipline: Road
- Role: Rider

Professional team
- 1957: Guardia de Franco

Major wins
- Grand Tours Vuelta a España 1 individual stage (1950)

Luis Navarro Amorós (3 January 1929 – 15 May 2011) was a Spanish cyclist in the 1950s. The highlight of his brief career was winning a stage of the Vuelta a España in 1950.

== Early life ==
Born in the La Tejera neighbourhood of Novelda in 1929, Navarro was the town's first professional cyclist. When he was young, his family moved to the city of Dolores, where he grew up and even developed the distinguished accent of Vega Baja del Segura.

== Cycling career ==
On 30 August 1950, the then unknown Navarro surprised many by beating two veteran teammates in the final sprint, including Bernardo Ruiz, to win stage 12 of the 1950 Vuelta a España with a time of 6 hours and 52 minutes, which consisted of 194 kilometers between Tarragona and Castellón, but despite this, he finished the race 23rd overall. In the following year, he won a stage at both the Volta a Catalunya and the Vuelta a la Comunidad de Madrid, and then won the 1952 Circuito Ribera del Jalón. He also took part in other national professional events, such as the Vuelta a Levante and the Vuelta a Andalucía, and participated in his second Vuelta a España in 1957.

Even after retiring in the early 1960s, Navarro remained closely linked to cycling, winning several veteran races, becoming a provincial track cycling coach, and mentoring many local cyclists, some of whom became professionals, such as Pedro Pardo and Hipólito Verdú. He also promoted and organised local tournaments, and in the 1990s, he became one of the strongest supporters of the project to build a municipal velodrome in Novelda city, but he did not lived long enough to see it completed due to several years of waiting, criticism, contempt, and obstacles.

== Death and legacy ==
Navarro died on 13 May 2011, at the age of 82. In 2022, the City Council of Novelda unanimously agreed to name its first velodrome after him in recognition of his prominent role in promoting cycling in Novelda. Three years later, in January 2025, the Luis Navarro Amorós velodrome was nominated for the prestigious FOPA 2025 Awards.
