= 1953 Volta a Catalunya =

Race details
- Dates: 6–13 September 1953
- Stages: 8
- Distance: 1,433 km (890.4 mi)
- Winning time: 42h 48' 21"

Results
	Winner	Salvador Botella (ESP)
	Second	Francisco Masip (ESP)
	Third	José Serra Gil (ESP)

The 1953 Volta a Catalunya was the 33rd edition of the Volta a Catalunya cycle race and was held from 6 September to 13 September 1953. The race started in Montjuïc and finished in Barcelona. The race was won by Salvador Botella.

== General classification ==
Final general classification

Rank	Rider	Time
1	Salvador Botella (ESP)	42h 48' 21"
2	Francisco Masip (ESP)	+ 2' 46"
3	José Serra Gil (ESP)	+ 3' 16"
4	Antonio Gelabert (ESP)	+ 5' 42"
5	Emilio Rodríguez (ESP)	+ 7' 58"
6	Bernardo Ruiz (ESP)	+ 8' 53"
7	Donato Zampini (ITA)	+ 9' 59"
8	Federico Bahamontes (ESP)	+ 13' 20"
9	Miguel Bover (ESP)	+ 14' 01"
10	Joaquim Filba Pascual (ESP)	+ 19' 32"
