= Hortensio Vidaurreta =

Spanish cyclist (1928–1984)

Personal information
- Full name: Hortensio Vidaurreta García
- Born: 11 January 1928 Igúzquiza, Spain
- Died: 28 February 1984 (aged 56) Vigo, Spain

Cycling career
- Sport: Cycling
- Discipline: Road
- Role: Rider

Professional teams
- 1946–1948: Independent
- 1949: Touring
- 1950–1953: Independent
- 1954: Berkel–Mostajo/RCD Español
- 1955: Peña Solera
- 1956: Faema
- 1957: Real Unión–Palmera
- 1958: Beasain–Caobania
- 1959: Urago–D'Alessandro
- 1960: Garsa

Hortensio Vidaurreta (11 January 1928 – 28 February 1984) was a Spanish road racing cyclist. Professional from 1947 to 1960, he won the Vuelta a Andalucía in 1957.

== Major results ==
1947
2nd Subida a Arrate
1948
1st GP Vizcaya
2nd GP Alava
2nd Subida a Arantzazu
2nd Subida a Arrate
1949
2nd GP Pascuas
1951
1st Campeonato Vasco-Navarro de Montaña
1952
1st Campeonato Vasco-Navarro de Montaña
1st Subida a Arrate
1st Stage 7 Vuelta in Castilla
3rd Prueba Villafranca de Ordizia
3rd Overall Gran Premio de la Bicicleta Eibarresa
1953
1st Campeonato Vasco-Navarro de Montaña
1st Circuito de Getxo
1st Prueba Villafranca de Ordizia
1st Trofeo Masferrer
1st Stage 4 GP Ayutamiento de Bilbao
1954
1st Prueba Villafranca de Ordizia
1st Stages 3 & 7 Vuelta a Aragón
2nd Circuito de Getxo
3rd National Hill Climb Championships
3rd Overall Gran Premio de la Bicicleta Eibarresa

1st Stage 2

1955
1st Campeonato Vasco-Navarro de Montaña
1st Klasika Primavera
1956
2nd Prueba Villafranca de Ordizia
2nd National Hill Climb Championships
3rd Campeonato Vasco-Navarro de Montaña
1957
1st Overall Vuelta a Andalucía
1st Circuito de Getxo
1st Stage 2 Gran Premio de la Bicicleta Eibarresa
2nd Prueba Villafranca de Ordizia
1958
1st Stage 1 Gran Premio de la Bicicleta Eibarresa
1st Stages 4 & 8 Vuelta a Andalucía
3rd Prueba Villafranca de Ordizia
