= 1949 Volta a Catalunya =

Race details
- Dates: 18–25 September 1949
- Stages: 8
- Distance: 1,228 km (763.0 mi)
- Winning time: 36h 01' 16"

Results
| | Winner | Émile Rol (FRA) |
| | Second | Miguel Poblet (ESP) |
| | Third | Robert Desbats (FRA) |

The 1949 Volta a Catalunya was the 29th edition of the Volta a Catalunya cycle race and was held from 18 September to 25 September 1949. The race started in Montjuïc and finished in Barcelona. The race was won by Émile Rol.

== General classification ==
Final general classification

| Rank | Rider | Time |
|---|---|---|
| 1 | Émile Rol (FRA) | 36h 01' 16" |
| 2 | Miguel Poblet (ESP) | + 3' 46" |
| 3 | Robert Desbats (FRA) | + 3' 46" |
| 4 | Alex Close (BEL) | + 5' 30" |
| 5 | Fermo Camellini (ITA) | + 5' 31" |
| 6 | Settimio Simonini (ITA) | + 7' 03" |
| 7 | José Serra Gil (ESP) | + 8' 18" |
| 8 | Ezio Cecchi (ITA) | + 8' 19" |
| 9 | Matias Alemany (ESP) | + 11' 02" |
| 10 | Antonio Gelabert (ESP) | + 13' 07" |
