= 1946 Volta a Catalunya =

Race details
- Dates: 8–15 September 1946
- Stages: 8
- Distance: 1,391 km (864.3 mi)
- Winning time: 46h 43' 58"

Results
	Winner	Julián Berrendero (ESP)
	Second	Gottfried Weilenmann (SUI)
	Third	Bernardo Capó (ESP)

The 1946 Volta a Catalunya was the 26th edition of the Volta a Catalunya cycle race and was held from 8 September to 15 September 1946. The race started in Montjuïc and finished in Barcelona. The race was won by Julián Berrendero.

== General classification ==
Final general classification

Rank	Rider	Time
1	Julián Berrendero (ESP)	46h 43' 58"
2	Gottfried Weilenmann (SUI)	+ 4' 18"
3	Bernardo Capó (ESP)	+ 7' 28"
4	Joaquín Olmos (ESP)	+ 8' 56"
5	Bernardo Ruiz (ESP)	+ 9' 02"
6	Lucien Vlaemynck (BEL)	+ 11' 27"
7	Willy Kern (SUI)	+ 16' 04"
8	Jean Goldschmit (LUX)	+ 21' 13"
9	Manuel Costa (ESP)	+ 25' 10"
10	Huub Sijen (NED)	+ 34' 13"
