= 1953 Critérium du Dauphiné Libéré =

Race details
- Dates: 7–14 June 1953
- Stages: 7
- Distance: 1,666 km (1,035 mi)
- Winning time: 47h 06' 28"

Results
	Winner	Lucien Teisseire (FRA)
	Second	Charly Gaul (LUX)
	Third	Jean Robic (FRA)

The 1953 Critérium du Dauphiné Libéré was the seventh edition of the cycle race and was held from 7 June to 14 June 1953. The race started and finished in Grenoble. The race was won by Lucien Teisseire.

== General classification ==
Final general classification

Rank	Rider	Time
1	Lucien Teisseire (FRA)	47h 06' 28"
2	Charly Gaul (LUX)	+ 4' 59"
3	Jean Robic (FRA)	+ 5' 32"
4	Raphaël Géminiani (FRA)	+ 5' 49"
5	Antonin Rolland (FRA)	+ 7' 54"
6	Armand Baeyens (BEL)	+ 13' 03"
7	José Serra Gil (ESP)	+ 14' 26"
8	Pierre Molinéris (FRA)	+ 15' 03"
9	Jean Brankart (BEL)	+ 15' 34"
10	Jean Dotto (FRA)	+ 16' 30"
