= Juan José Sagarduy =

Spanish cyclist

Personal information
- Full name: Juan José Sagarduy Ayastru
- Born: 14 June 1941 Zaratamo, Biscay, Spain
- Died: 4 October 2010 (aged 69) Galdakao, Biscay, Spain

Cycling career
- Sport: Cycling
- Discipline: Road
- Role: Rider
- Rider type: Climber

Professional teams
- 1961–1962: Espumosos Gorbea
- 1963–1967: Kas–Kaskol
- 1968–1969: Karpy
- 1969: La Casera–Peña Bahamontes

Juan José Sagarduy (14 June 1941 – 4 October 2010) was a Spanish professional cyclist. His last victory as a professional was the Subida a La Reineta in 1967, after physical problems shortened his career. He was forced to retire early in 1969, after being unable to finish his final race at the Vuelta a Levante.

== Biography ==
Sagarduy was born in Zaratamo on 14 June 1941, and died in Galdakao at the age of 69. A great climber of the 1960s, his best season was in 1963, when he won the Subida a Arrate ahead of Federico Bahamontes and Jacques Anquetil, the Bicicleta Eibarresa and the GP Pascuas in Pamplona among other races. At the 1964 Tour del Porvenir, he won two stages and the mountains classification. He started his career with the Espumosos Gorbea team, followed by Kas–Kaskol and Karpy.

He died on 4 October 2010. His funeral was held on Wednesday October 6 at the church of San Pedro de Basauri at half past six in the afternoon.

== Career ==
His most notable result was his victory in the 1963 Euskal Bizikleta, where he also won the mountains classification and the 5th stage. In 1965 he was selected to ride in the Tour de France. He finished in 46th place. Within the national tests he took the podium in the third stage of the Vuelta a Mallorca and on the Ascent to La Reineta. He rode with Kas–Kaskol from 1963 until 1967, who were sponsored by a soft drink firm for two more years. He then signed for Karpy and retired from cycling in March 1969, after eight years as a professional.

== Major results ==
1961
1st G. P. Ayuntamiento de Bilbao
1963
1st Overall Euskal Bizikleta

1st Stage 5

1st GP Pascuas
1st
1st Stage 8 Vuelta a Andalucía
1st Stage 1 Circuito Montañés
1964
1st Gran Premio de Llodio
2nd Subida a Urkiola
8th Overall Vuelta a Andalucía
9th Overall Tour de l'Avenir

1st Stages 6 & 7
1st Mountains classification
1st Points classification

1965
1st Stage 3a Vuelta a Mallorca
4th Overall Euskal Bizikleta
1966
1st GP Pascuas
1st Stage 1 Euskal Bizikleta
1st Stage 7 Volta a la Comunitat Valenciana
3rd Subida a Arrate

=== Grand Tour results ===
==== Tour de France ====
- 1965: 46

==== Vuelta a España ====
- 1968: 41
