= 1959 Milan–San Remo =

Race details
- Dates: 19 March 1959
- Stages: 1
- Distance: 281 km (175 mi)
- Winning time: 6h 45' 33"

Results
	Winner	Miguel Poblet (ESP)
	Second	Rik Van Steenbergen (BEL)
	Third	Leon Vandaele (BEL)

The 1959 Milan–San Remo was the 50th edition of the Milan–San Remo cycle race and was held on 19 March 1959. The race started in Milan and finished in San Remo. The race was won by Miguel Poblet.

== General classification ==
Final general classification

Rank	Rider	Time
1	Miguel Poblet (ESP)	6h 45' 33"
2	Rik Van Steenbergen (BEL)	+ 0"
3	Leon Vandaele (BEL)	+ 0"
4	Frans De Mulder (BEL)	+ 0"
5	Michel Van Aerde (BEL)	+ 0"
6	Vito Favero (ITA)	+ 0"
7	Willy Vannitsen (BEL)	+ 0"
8	Silvano Ciampi (ITA)	+ 0"
9	Giorgio Albani (ITA)	+ 0"
10	Arthur Decabooter (BEL)	+ 0"
