= 1957 Milan–San Remo =

Race details
- Dates: 19 March 1957
- Stages: 1
- Distance: 282 km (175 mi)
- Winning time: 6h 55' 51"

Results
	Winner	Miguel Poblet (ESP)
	Second	Fred De Bruyne (BEL)
	Third	Brian Robinson (GBR)

The 1957 Milan–San Remo was the 48th edition of the Milan–San Remo cycle race and was held on 19 March 1957. The race started in Milan and finished in San Remo. The race was won by Miguel Poblet.

== General classification ==
Final general classification

Rank	Rider	Time
1	Miguel Poblet (ESP)	6h 55' 51"
2	Fred De Bruyne (BEL)	+ 0"
3	Brian Robinson (GBR)	+ 0"
4	Julien Schepens (BEL)	+ 0"
5	Jef Planckaert (BEL)	+ 0"
6	Nicolas Barone (FRA)	+ 0"
7	Nino Defilippis (ITA)	+ 24"
8	Rik Van Steenbergen (BEL)	+ 24"
9	Guido Messina (ITA)	+ 24"
10	Dino Bruni (ITA)	+ 24"
