= War pension =

Pension for veterans of war

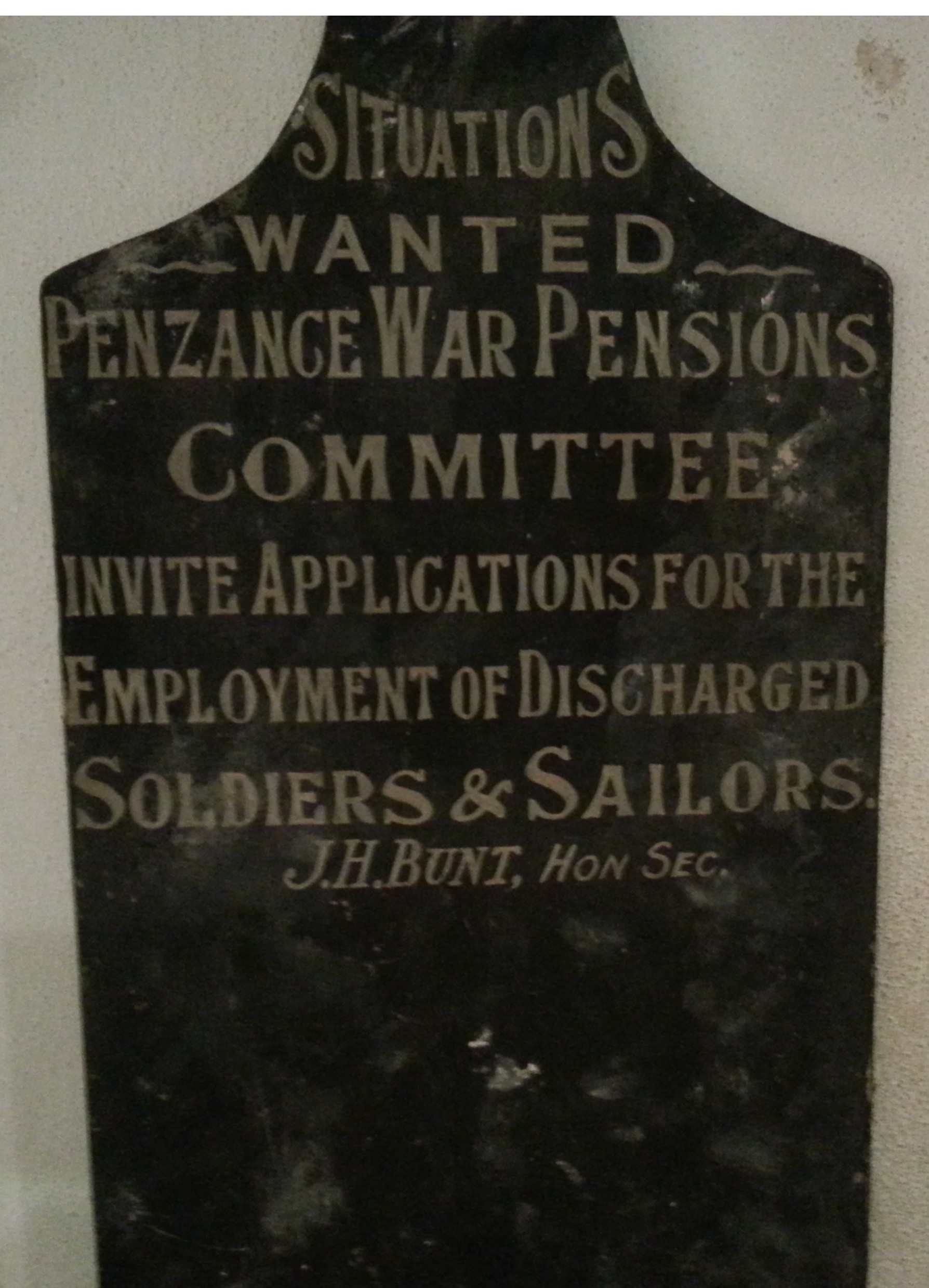
Penzance War Pension Committee in the Scilly Isles museum

A war pension is a pension provided to a veteran of an armed conflict.

They are almost certainly the most ancient type of social security.

Plutarch's Life of Solon mentions a law which provides that those who are maimed in war shall be maintained at the public charge. Halsbury's Laws of England traced their history back to the days of King Alfred. Until 1978 the British War Pension scheme was run entirely under the Royal Prerogative and completely without legislation.

== See also ==
- Veterans' benefits (United States)
