= 1951 Volta a Catalunya =

Race details
- Dates: 13–23 September 1951
- Stages: 11
- Distance: 1,596 km (991.7 mi)
- Winning time: 47h 12' 57"

Results
	Winner	Primo Volpi (ITA)
	Second	Francisco Masip (ESP)
	Third	Manuel Rodríguez Barros (ESP)

The 1951 Volta a Catalunya was the 31st edition of the Volta a Catalunya cycle race and was held from 13 September to 23 September 1951. The race started in Sant Esteve Sesrovires and finished in Barcelona. The race was won by Primo Volpi.

== General classification ==
Final general classification

Rank	Rider	Time
1	Primo Volpi (ITA)	47h 12' 57"
2	Francisco Masip (ESP)	+ 3' 17"
3	Manuel Rodríguez Barros (ESP)	+ 3' 38"
4	José Serra Gil (ESP)	+ 5' 23"
5	Pedro Sant (ESP)	+ 6' 30"
6	Jesús Loroño (ESP)	+ 6' 50"
7	Andrés Trobat (ESP)	+ 8' 09"
8	Jose Vidal Porcar (ESP)	+ 9' 43"
9	Pietro Giudici (ITA)	+ 11' 13"
10	Joaquin Filba (ESP)	+ 14' 41"
