= Luis Navarro (athlete) =

Venezuelan athlete

Personal information
- Nickname: El Hueso
- Born: 7 March 1935 Los Teques, Venezuela
- Died: 30 August 2015 (aged 80) Los Teques, Venezuela
- Years active: 1948–1960

Sport
- Sport: Basketball, baseball, cycling, and volleybal
- Team: Zuliano (1948–55) and Miranda (1955–57)

Luis Navarro, better known as El Hueso (7 March 1935 – 30 August 2015), was a Venezuelan multi-sport athlete who was successful as both a basketball and volleyball player, road cyclist, and baseball pitcher. He is best known for scoring 107 points in a single basketball game in 1957, for which he received the Guinness World Record.

== Early and personal life ==
Luis Navarro was born in the La Estrella neighborhood of the city of Los Teques in the state of Miranda, on 7 March 1935. (Note: Some sources wrongly state that he was born on 7 March 1937.) Navarro married fellow volleyball player Carmen Bustamante, with whom he had three children. His sister Carmen was also a basketball player for the Miranda national team.

== Sporting career ==
Navarro began his sports career at the 1948 Student Sports Games in Venezuela, aged 13, competing in baseball and volleyball. He was very thin, thus earning the nickname El Hueso ("the bone"). When he went to the Miranda high school in the mid-1950s, Navarro joined the state's national teams in different disciplines, becoming the star player of its basketball and baseball teams, putting out outstanding performances in national competitions, but also excelling in cycling, volleyball, and softball.

In 1948, the 13-year-old Navarro, together with Thelmo Romero, Germán Garrido, and a few others, was among the most outstanding players of the first National Basketball Championship in Venezuela. On 6 August 1950, in the opening match of the third edition, he and Clemente Carrasquero led their team Zuliano to a 52–47 victory over the Mirandinos, but they ended up finishing as runner-ups. He wore the Venezuelan basketball jersey at the 1951 Bolivarian Games, and at the 1955 Pan American Games in Mexico. In the opening match of the 1955–56 National Championship, Navarro, until then a perennial representative of Zuliano, caused surprise by starting for Miranda, which won 67–50.

Two years later, on 11 August 1957, the 22-year-old Navarro scored 107 points to help his side to a 109–86 victory over the Nueva Esparta team in a National Championship match held on a dirt floor at Nuevo Circo de Caracas, a feat that earned him a mention in the Guinness World Record for the most points scored in a single basketball game. (Note: Some sources claim that the previous Venezuelan record had also been set by him with 75 points to help Zuliano to a 85–68 win over Universidad del Zulia in 1949, while other state that it was Gustavo López with 74 points, in a match between Carabobo and Cojedes in 1951.) Additionally, he set two other records: 61 points in the second half and 17 free throws made. After the match, he revealed that Miranda had stepped onto the field with the preconceived plan of giving him the greatest number of balls, so that he could try to score as many points as possible, in order to win the scoring champion trophy, which he did.

Navarro was also an international baseball player, standing out as a pitcher in the double A category in Caracas baseball teams in the 1950s and 1960s. After retiring from athletics, he began training athletes and even served as sports director of the Miranda state. He was also a prominent leader in the Miranda Basketball Association and the regional National Sports Institute.

== Later life and death ==
In 1960, the first-ever gymnasium built in the city of Los Teques, located on Bermúdez Avenue, was named after him in his honor, and in 2011, his sporting career was recognized with the YMCA's Good Sportsman of Venezuela award.

Navarro died in Los Teques on 30 August 2015, at the age of 80. Coincidentally, in Valencia, there is a street named after Luis Navarro on nº 107, but this person was a priest.
