= Luis Navarro (photographer) =

Chilean photographer

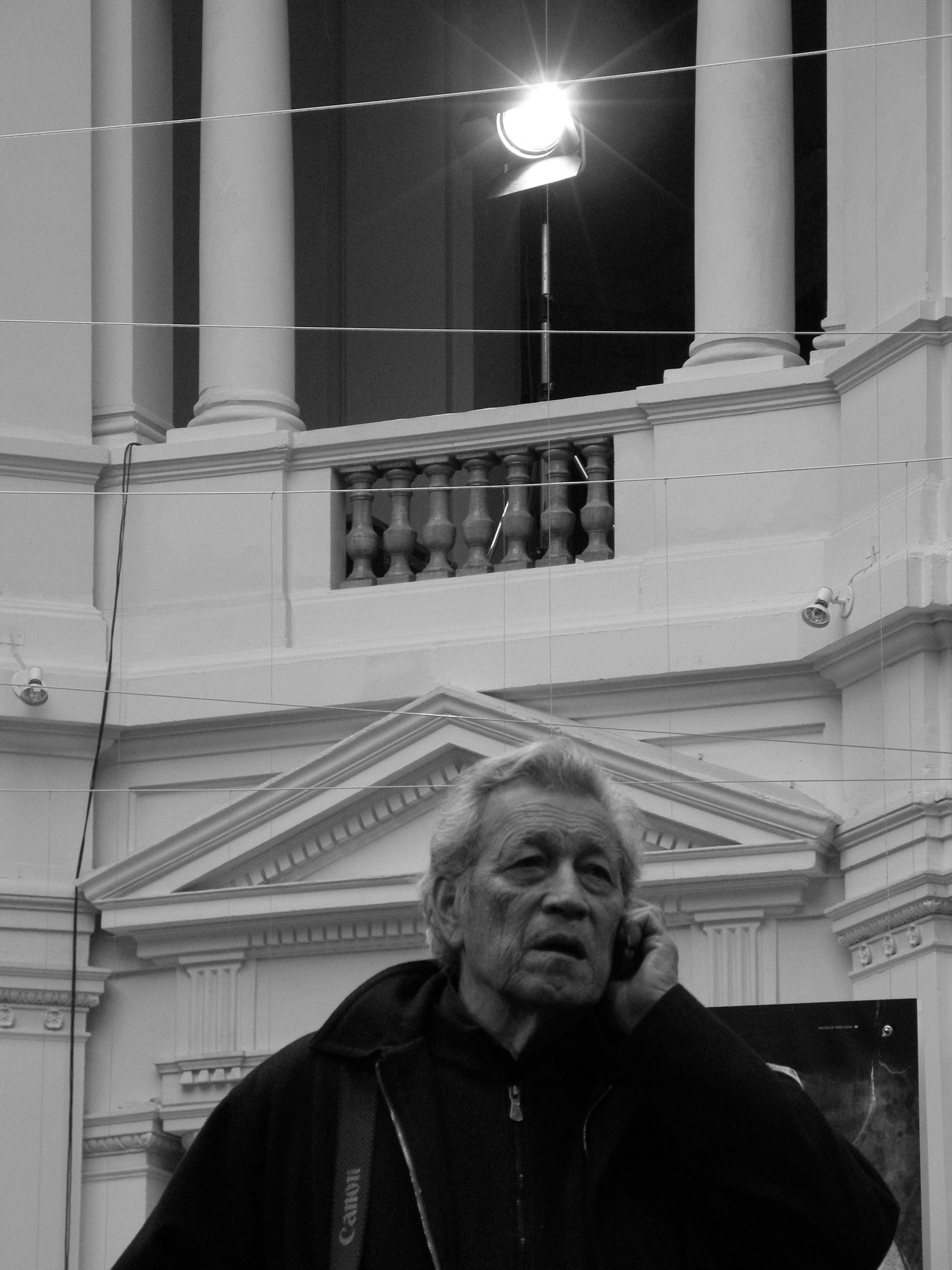
- Born: Luis Eduardo Navarro Vega; 2 May 1938 (age 88); Antofagasta, Chile
- Citizenship: Spanish
- Occupations: Photographer; Human rights activists; Writers

President of the Association of Independent Photographers

Luis Eduardo Navarro Vega (born 2 May 1938) is a Chilean photographer who is best known for his images exposing human rights violations committed during the Military dictatorship of Chile. He was one of the founders and the last president of the Association of Independent Photographers (AFI).

== Early life and education ==
Born on 2 May 1938 in Antofagasta, Chile, as the youngest of six siblings, Navarro began going to the movies at a very early age thanks to some of his older brothers, who became friends with the doorman, which allowed him to watch inappropriate movies for his age. He thus soon become familiar with cinematic aspects, such as lighting, framing and composition, and his love for cinema led him to enroll at the Universidad del Norte to study Fine Arts, but eventually he also began taking specialized courses in professional photography.

== Career ==
After relocating to Santiago in 1976, Navarro began working for the magazine Solidaridad, where his initial responsibility was to take portraits of political prisoners and executed individuals brought by their families for identification. Before long, he started taking his camera to the streets, transitioning into a photojournalist for both Solidaridad and international news agencies.

His most well-known photographs exposed human rights violations committed in Chile during the military regime; for instance, in 1978, Navarro documented the first discovery of skeletal remains belonging to disappeared detainees in the town of Lonquén, most of whom being peasants who had been executed and then buried in the Lonquén ovens. He also carried out crucial work at the Vicaría de la Solidaridad, an organization founded by the Cardinal Silva Henríquez to support victims of human rights violations during the military dictatorship, which earned him constant threats and several arrests.

On 11 March 1981, he was assigned to take a picture of the Chilean dictator Augusto Pinochet entering through the main door of the Santiago Cathedral for the cover of Solidaridad, but he only managed to pull the shutter five times until he had several guns pointed at him, being subsequently arrested by agents of the National Information Center (CNI), who took all his equipment on his way to the Borgoño barracks, near the Mapocho Station, a clandestine detention center that he had already discovered as part of his work in Vicaría. He was only released a few days thanks to the intervention of international human rights organizations and, in particular, Cardinal Silva Henríquez. His arrest was a key event that spurred the formation of the Association of Independent Photographers (AFI) in 1981, an entity that lasted 9 years, with Navarro serving as its last president.

Beyond his political work, Navarro has built an extensive photographic portfolio capturing Santiago's urban life, the culture of the gypsies, and the national theater scene. He worked for various media outlets, including the newspapers Fortín Mapocho, La Época, and the magazine Pluma y Pincel, and he later worked as a photographic curator at the Mapocho Station Cultural Corporation (1994–2004), and then as a photographer for the Chamber of Deputies (2000–2004). Navarro also participated in several individual exhibitions, such as the first AFI Photographic Yearbook in 1981, and the "Luis Navarro, Photographs of Memory", held at the CEINA Cultural Center in September 2024.

== Legacy ==
Navarro won several awards, including the Altazor Award in 2011, United Nations Award in 2005, and the UNICEF International Competition in 1980, as well as being recognized as a "Distinguished Visitor of the city of Rosario". Most of his work is now part of different archives that preserve the defense of human rights during the Military Dictatorship, such as the "Archive of Human Rights of the Vicaria de la Solidaridad" and the "Memory of the World of UNESCO.

== Work ==
- Lonquén
- Aventuras de una Fe ("Adventures of a Faith
- Presencia de un niño en América ("Presence of a Child in America")
- El Papa Juan Pablo Segundo II ("Pope John Paul II")
- Primer anuario de la fotografía chilena ("First Yearbook of Chilean Photography")
- Segundo anuario de la fotografía chilena ("Second Yearbook of Chilean Photography")
- Síntesis del Informe Rettig ("Summary of the Rettig Report")
- Fotógrafos latinoamericanos en la Universidad de Rábida ("Latin American Photographers at the University of Rábida")
- 50º Aniversario de la declaración Universal de D.D.H.H. ("50th Anniversary of the Universal Declaration of Human Rights")
- Geografía Poética de Chile ("Poetic Geography of Chile")
- La Potencia de la Memoria ("The Power of Memory", with texts by Gonzalo Leiva) (2004)
- Foturí, Gitanos en Chile ("Foturi, Gypsies in Chile") (2014)
