= Jesús Dermit =

Spanish cyclist (1909–1988)

Personal information
- Born: 14 March 1909
- Died: 14 October 1988 (aged 79)

Cycling career
- Sport: Cycling
- Discipline: Road
- Role: Rider

Jesús Dermit (14 March 1909 – 14 October 1988) was a Spanish racing cyclist. He rode in the 1930 Tour de France.
