= Émile Rol =

French cyclist

Personal information
- Born: 17 April 1920 Tourrettes-sur-Loup, France
- Died: 1 September 2008 (aged 88)

Cycling career
- Sport: Cycling
- Discipline: Road
- Role: Rider

Professional teams
- 1943: Rhonson–Dunlop
- 1943: Helyett–Hutchinson
- 1944: Europe–Dunlop
- 1945: Ray–Dunlop
- 1946: Urago–Dunlop
- 1947: Thomas–Rosset
- 1948: Iberia
- 1948–1949: La Perle–Hutchinson
- 1950: Elvish–Fontan–Wolber
- 1951–1952: Tendil–Hutchinson
- 1953: Peugeot–Dunlop
- 1954: Urago–D'Alessandro

Émile Rol (17 April 1920 – 1 September 2008) was a French racing cyclist. He rode in the 1950 Tour de France. He also won the 1949 Volta a Catalunya.

== Major results ==
1943
2nd Critérium National de la Route (free zone)
1946
5th Overall Monaco–Paris
1948
9th Overall Critérium du Dauphiné Libéré
1949
1st Overall Volta a Catalunya

1st Stage 2

1st GP Monaco
1950
1st Stage 5 Tour d'Algérie
