= Francisco Masip =

Spanish cyclist (1926–2015)

Personal information
- Full name: Francisco Masip Llop
- Born: 8 August 1926 Barcelona, Spain
- Died: 25 September 2015 (aged 89) Santa Coloma de Gramenet, Spain

Cycling career
- Sport: Cycling
- Discipline: Road
- Role: Rider

Professional teams
- 1948: Insecticidas Z.Z.
- 1949–1951: Individual
- 1952: Torpado
- 1953: Metropole-Hutchinson
- 1953: Peña Solera
- 1954: Gitane–Hutchinson
- 1954: Ideor
- 1954–1956: Splendid-d'Alessandro
- 1957: Ignis–Doniselli
- 1957: Mobylette Coabania
- 1958: Ignis–Doniselli
- 1958: Peña Solera-Cacaolat
- 1959: Maderas Goiria
- 1960: Maderas Goiria
- 1960: Faema

Major wins
- Spanish National Road Race Championships (1953); 1st stages in the Volta a la Comunitat Valenciana (1955)

Francisco Masip Llop (8 August 1926 – 25 September 2015) was a Spanish professional cyclist. He was professional from 1948 until 1960.

== Biography ==
Masip was born in Barcelona, Catalonia, on August 8, 1926. He has lived in Santa Coloma de Gramenet for his entire life.

== Career ==
He was the first Spanish cyclist to participate in five consecutive Tour de France editions, between 1951 and 1955. His cycling career spanned 16 seasons, from 1945 to 1960, in which he obtained a total of 19 victories.

== Major results ==
1945
3rd Trofeo Jaumendreu
1946
5th Trofeo Jaumendreu
1948
1st Trofeo Jaumendreu
8th Overall Vuelta Ciclista a la Comunidad Valenciana
1949
3rd National Climbing Championships
1950
1st Trofeo Jaumendreu
1st Trofeo Masferrer
2nd Overall GP Catalunya
3rd Overall Volta a Catalunya
1951
2nd Overall Volta a Catalunya
1952
6th Overall Volta a Catalunya
1953
1st Road race, National Road Championships
2nd Overall Euskal Bizikleta

1st Stage 2

2nd Overall Volta a Catalunya
1954
1st Clásica a los Puertos
2nd Overall Volta a Tarragona
4th Overall Vuelta a Aragón

1st Stage 2

7th Overall Euskal Bizikleta
1955
1st Overall Vuelta Ciclista a la Comunidad Valenciana

1st Stages 1 & 6

1st Stage 6a Vuelta a Andalucía
2nd Clásica a los Puertos
3rd Trofeo Masferrer
1956
1st Trofeo Masferrer
3rd Road race, National Road Championships
3rd Overall Volta a Catalunya
3rd National Climbing Championships
1959
6th Overall Euskal Bizikleta

=== Grand Tour results ===
==== Tour de France ====
- 1951: 59th
- 1952: 30th
- 1953: 46th
- 1954: 55th
- 1955: DNF

==== Vuelta a España ====
- 1948: DNF
- 1955: 31st
- 1956: 28th
- 1957: 18th
- 1958: DNF

==== Giro d'Italia ====
- 1954: 39th
