= Luis Navarro (footballer) =

Spanish footballer

Personal information
- Full name: Luis Navarro Solves
- Birth name: Lluís Navarro i Solves
- Date of birth: 26 November 1939
- Place of birth: Barcelona, Catalonia, Spain
- Date of death: 18 February 2012 (aged 72)
- Place of death: L'Escala, Catalonia, Spain
- Height: 1.75 m (5 ft 9 in)
- Position: Defender

Youth career
- UA Horta
- Barcelona U19

Senior career*
Years	Team	Apps	(Gls)
1958–1959	Barcelona Amateur		
1959–1962	Condal	53	(0)
1961–1962	→ Sabadell (on loan)	27	(0)
1962–1964	Racing de Santander	56	(0)
1964–1968	Espanyol	21	(0)
1966–1967	→ Lleida (on loan)	19	(0)
1967–1968	→ Levante (on loan)	19	(0)
1968–1969	Levante		
1969–1973	Escala		
1975–1976	Bellcaire		
- * Club domestic league appearances and goals

Luis Navarro Solves (26 November 1939 – 18 February 2012) was a Spanish footballer who played as a defender for Sabadell, Racing de Santander, and Espanyol in the 1960s.

== Playing career ==
Born in Barcelona on 26 November 1939, (Note: Some sources wrongly state that he was born on 27 April 1939.) Navarro began his football career in the youth ranks of his hometown clubs UA Horta and FC Barcelona, where he went on to play for the Amateur team in the 1958–59 season. He then joined Condal, where he stayed for three seasons, from 1959 to 1962, playing the latter season on loan to Sabadell, because he had had to do his military service there.

In 1962, he joined Racing de Santander, then in the Segunda División, where he had two good seasons, so in 1964, he was signed by First Division side Espanyol, then coached by László Kubala. He made his debut for Espanyoln 27 September 1964, helping his side to a 1–0 victory over Elche. He was a starter on the left wing practically the entire season, but lost prominence in the following season and ended up being loaned to Lleida (1966–67) and then Levante (1967–68), both in La Liga. He stayed with the latter, but in 1969, he left for Escala, remaining there for four years, until 1973, and then he played his last football at Bellcaire in 1975–76. In total, he played 21 La Liga matches for Espanyol, Lleida, and Levante between 1964 and 1968.

== Death ==
Navarro married Josefa Sastre Gandía, with whom he had four sons. He lived the rest of his life at L'Escala, Catalonia, where he died on 18 February 2012, at the age of 72.
