= Luis Navarro (writer) =

Spanish Dominican priest and writer

- Born: Lluís Navarro; 1788; Alboraya, Horta, Spain
- Died: 1826 (aged 37–38); Spain
- Citizenship: Spanish
- Occupations: Dominican priest; Professor; Author; Poet
- Known for: Author of Historia de la provincia de Aragón, Orden de Predicadores

Luis Navarro (1788 – 1846) was a Spanish Dominican priest, professor of philosophy, writer, and poet.

== Early life ==
Born in 1788 in the Valencian town of Alboraya, Horta, Navarro joined the Dominican Order, for whom he served as a prior of the convent of Sogorb and later lived in the Convent of Santo Domingo in Valencia. He was also a professor of philosophy at the convent of San Onofre.

== Writing career ==
Together with Mariano Rais, Navarro wrote a history of his order in the province of Aragon, titled Historia de la provincia de Aragón, Orden de Predicadores desde el año 1808 hasta el de 1818 ("History of the province of Aragon, Order of Preachers from the year 1808 to 1818"), which was published by Francisco Magallón in Zaragoza in 1819.

In Catalan, Navarro was the author of satirical-festive poems, such as El fill de l'especier ("The son of the spice") in 1817, and El comte d'Urgell ("The Count of Urgell") in 1843, which became very popular and were reprinted several times. He also wrote about the miracles of Saint Vincent Ferrer, a fellow Valencian Dominican friar, and was also the author of Historia sobre el fingido cardenal de Borbón ("History about the false cardinal of Bourbon").

== Later life and death ==
During the French invasion of Spain in 1823, Navarro attempted to raise the national spirit against the invader, so he was exiled to France; he later wrote some memoirs of this episode, but they are now lost. He died in Valencia in 1826, at the age of either 38 or 39, most likely from the after-effects of his stay in France. (Note: Some sources wrongly state that he died in 1846.)

== Legacy ==
In June 1913, one of the historic streets of the Poblados Marítimos in Valencia, was renamed as Calle del Padre Luis Navarro to perpetuate the memory of not only Luis Navarro Oliver (1844–1911) the first parish priest of the Canyamelar Church, but also that of the Dominican Luis Navarro, "a distinguished poet, Dominican friar and a cultivator of Valencian literature".

== Works ==
- "The son of the spice" (1817)
- "History of the province of Aragon, Order of Preachers from the year 1808 to 1818" (Zaragoza, 1819)
- "The Count of Urgell" (1843)
