= Bernardo Ruiz =

Spanish cyclist (1925–2025)

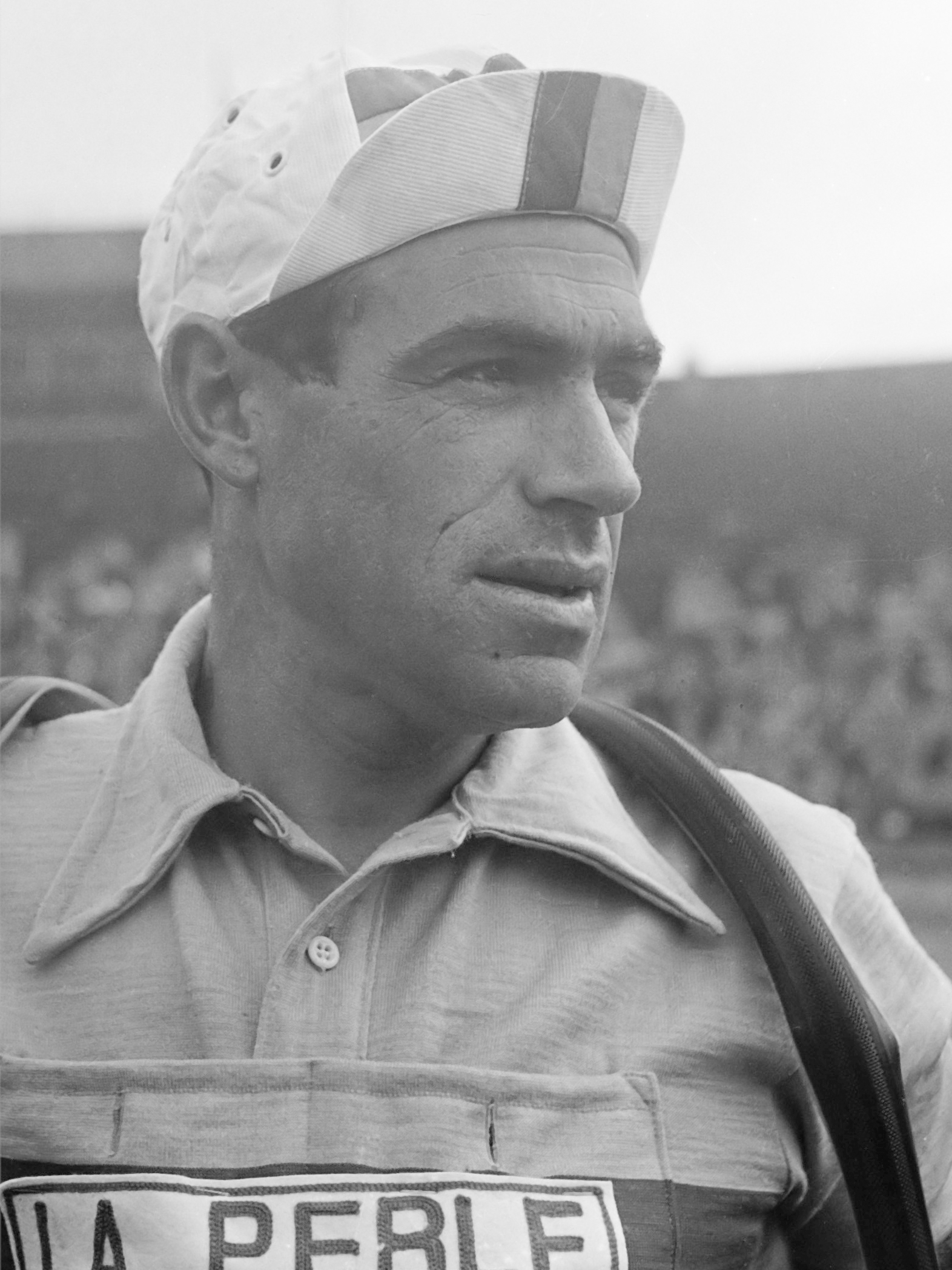
- Ruiz at the 1954 Tour de France

Personal information
- Born: 8 January 1925 Orihuela, Spain
- Died: 14 August 2025 (aged 100) Orihuela, Spain

Cycling career
- Sport: Cycling
- Discipline: Road
- Role: Rider
- Rider type: All-rounder

Major wins
- Grand Tours Tour de France 2 individual stages (1951) Giro d'Italia 1 individual stage (1955) Vuelta a España General classification (1948) Mountains classification (1948) 4 individual stages (1948, 1950) Stage races Volta a Catalunya (1945) One-day races and Classics National Road Race Championship (1946, 1948, 1951)

Bernardo Ruiz Navarrete (Spanish: [beɾˈnaɾðo ˈrwiθ naβaˈrete]; 8 January 1925 – 14 August 2025) was a Spanish professional road bicycle racer who won the overall and climbers competition at the 1948 Vuelta a España. He went on to become the first Spaniard to take two wins in a single edition of the Tour de France in 1951, the first to finish on the overall podium at the Tour the following year, and the first to win a stage of the Giro d'Italia in 1955.

== Early life ==
Ruiz was born into a Communist Party-supporting family in Orihuela and grew up in the Valencian Community: he himself was a member of the pioneer movement in Spain during his youth. After the defeat of the Republican faction in the Spanish Civil War, his family suffered discrimination in the White Terror for their political views, with his father being banned from formal employment and forced to report to the local police station every two weeks. Being unable to find work, the family milled flour and transported it with a donkey and cart to Valencia to sell.

== Career ==
One of Ruiz's older brothers was forced into the Blue Division, a Spanish Army unit which fought alongside the German Army on the Eastern Front during World War 2. He was injured by a Soviet grenade thrown at his machine gun post which killed everyone else stationed there, and received a war pension which enabled him to lend Ruiz the money to pay for his first bicycle, an Alcyon. He bought the bike to replace the family's donkey, which had died in a road accident, as a means of transport. According to Ruiz, he first competed unknowingly in a cycle race as a teenager when he came across a group of riders going in the opposite direction to him, and spontaneously decided to follow them, unaware that they were in competition. He took a breakthrough win at the Valencia regional championships, organised by the Franco regime's sole legal political party, the FET y de las JONS, whilst still a teenager. As a result of his success, the discrimination against his family ended.

In 1945 Ruiz won the Volta a Catalunya, then Spain's most lucrative bike race, at the age of 20. This was his first race outside of the Valencian region, and helped to launch his professional career. That year he also made his debut in the Vuelta a España, where he came 23rd out of 26 finishers. He described the experience of riding the race as "terrifying". Three years later he took the overall classification in the race, taking the lead from Dalmacio Langarica after the latter lost time due to several punctures. Upon completion of the race, Ruiz was supposed to receive the winner's trophy from Francisco Franco in a ceremony at the then-new Santiago Bernabéu Stadium; however upon learning that he would have to wait three hours for a football match to be completed before the presentation, he elected to leave.

In 1949, Ruiz competed in the Tour de France as part of the Spain national team. After they received abuse from Spanish Republican exiles, Ruiz and his teammates withdrew from the race on the fifth stage and left to compete in the Volta a Portugal. As a result of the withdrawal, Spain was not invited the following year; a team was sent in 1951, including Ruiz. He took two stage wins, the first for Spain since the Civil War, and finished ninth overall. In the following year's Tour, Ruiz finished third in the general classification behind Fausto Coppi and Stan Ockers. Ruiz later said he could not have overhauled Coppi for the win, but that he had lost out on being runner-up due to his cautious descending down Mont Ventoux, which lost him four minutes to Coppi and Ockers — Ruiz stated that he was careful in his descent because he was worried about his tyres overheating.

After retiring from competition, he became a directeur sportif, including for the Faema team, where he managed Federico Bahamontes, despite the pair having previously engaged in fistfights: Ruiz stated ahead of the 1960 Vuelta a España that "we mutually tolerate one another".

== Legacy ==
Ruiz had to race with heavy equipment because Spain was going through a depression. Ruiz is one of the few riders to have completed all three Grand Tours in a single season, which he did on three occasions. As of 2020 only two other riders have accomplished this more than three times. During his career he rode a total of 21 Grand Tours, and completed 12 Grand Tours consecutively.

Alasdair Fotheringham has described him as "an accidental pioneer for post-Civil War Spanish professional cycling", through his international success at a time when Spain was experiencing economic hardship during the early years of the Franco era, paving the way for countrymen such as Federico Bahamontes.

Ruiz turned 100 on 8 January 2025, and died on 14 August of the same year.

== Major results ==
1945
1st Overall Volta a Catalunya
1946
1st Road race, National Road Championships
1st Trofeo Jaumendreu
4th Trofeo Masferrer
5th Overall Volta a Catalunya

1st Stage 7

1947
1st Overall Vuelta a Burgos
2nd Road race, National Road Championships
2nd Overall Gran Premio Cataluña

1st Stages 4 & 6

2nd Trofeo Jaumendreu
4th Overall Vuelta a Levante

1st Stages 4 & 5

7th Trofeo Masferrer
7th GP Pascuas
1948
1st Road race, National Road Championships
1st Overall Vuelta a España

1st Mountains classification
1st Stages 1 (ITT), 4 & 12

1949
3rd Overall Gran Premio Cataluña

1st Stage 4 (ITT)

3rd Trofeo Masferrer
1950
1st Clásica a los Puertos de Guadarrama
2nd Road race, National Road Championships
4th Overall Vuelta a España

1st Stage 8b

5th Overall Volta a Catalunya

1st Stage 5

5th Trofeo Masferrer
1951
1st Road race, National Road Championships
1st Overall Vuelta a Castilla
1st Clásica a los Puertos de Guadarrama
1st Stage 3 Tour de Romandie
1st Stage 11 Volta a Catalunya
3rd Trofeo Masferrer
9th Overall Tour de France

1st Stages 10 & 21

1952
3rd Overall Tour de France
4th Overall Vuelta a Castilla

1st Stage 5 (ITT)

8th Overall Volta a Catalunya
1953
2nd Clásica a los Puertos de Guadarrama
3rd Trofeo Masferrer
6th Overall Volta a Catalunya
8th Road race, National Road Championships
1954
1st Overall Vuelta a Asturias

1st Stage 4 (ITT)

2nd Road race, National Road Championships
2nd GP Pascuas
3rd Overall Vuelta a Levante

1st Stage 2

3rd Clásica a los Puertos de Guadarrama
1955
1st Stage 10 Giro d'Italia
3rd Overall Eibarko Bizikleta

1st Stage 4 (ITT)

4th GP Pascuas
6th Trofeo Masferrer
9th Overall Volta a Catalunya
1956
2nd Road race, National Road Championships
2nd Overall Trofeo Mallorca

1st Stage 2 (ITT)

2nd GP Pascuas
1957
1st Overall Vuelta a Levante
3rd Overall Vuelta a España
7th Overall Volta a Catalunya
1958
7th Overall Vuelta a Andalucía
10th Overall Vuelta a Levante

=== Grand Tour general classification results timeline ===
Grand Tour	1945	1946	1947	1948	1949	1950	1951	1952	1953	1954	1955	1956	1957	1958
/ Vuelta a España	22	13	—	1	NH	4	Not held				14	31	3	26
Giro d'Italia	NH	—	—	—	—	—	—	35	29	38	28	38	55	—
Tour de France	Not held		—	—	DNF	—	9	3	—	18	22	70	24	55

Legend
—	Did not compete
DNF	Did not finish
NH	Not Held
