= Omer Braeckeveldt =

Belgian cyclist (1917–1987)

Omer Braekevelt
Personal information
- Born: 10 October 1917 (age 109) Tielt, Belgium
- Died: 6 August 1987 (aged 69) Bruges, Belgium

Cycling career
- Sport: Cycling
- Discipline: Road
- Role: Rider

Professional teams
- 1949: Erka–Terrot
- 1950–1951: Terrot–Wolber
- 1951: Vredestein
- 1952–1954: Terrot–Hutchinson
- 1954: Alpa
- 1955: Thompson

Omer Braekevelt (10 October 1917 – 6 August 1987) was a Belgian road cyclist, who competed as a professional from 1949 to 1955. He most notably won the first stage of the 1950 Vuelta a España, and held the leader's jersey for the first four stages.

== Major results ==
1949
3rd Nationale Sluitingprijs
6th Kampioenschap van Vlaanderen
1950
Vuelta a España

1st Stage 1
Held after Stages 1–4

2nd Nationale Sluitingprijs
2nd Wingene Koers
3rd Circuit Houtland–Torhout
1951
3rd Overall Tour of Belgium
5th Circuit des XI Villes
1952
5th Nationale Sluitingprijs
6th Kampioenschap van Vlaanderen
1953
1st Stadsprijs Geraardsbergen
1st Wingene Koers
2nd Omloop Mandel-Leie-Schelde
3rd Roubaix–Huy
1954
1st Gullegem Koerse
1st Wingene Koers
4th Overall Tour of Belgium
