= Bernardo Capó =

Spanish cyclist (1919–2000)

Personal information
- Born: 20 October 1919 Muro, Spain
- Died: 11 February 2000 (aged 80) Muro, Spain

Cycling career
- Sport: Cycling
- Discipline: Road
- Role: Rider

Bernardo Capó (20 October 1919 – 11 February 2000) was a Spanish racing cyclist. He rode in the 1949 Tour de France.

== Major results ==
1945
1st Stage 3a Circuito del Norte
8th Overall Vuelta a España
1946
1st Overall Vuelta a Burgos

1st Stage 3

1st Overall Vuelta a Mallorca
3rd Overall Volta a Catalunya
3rd Road race, National Road Championships
1947
1st Road race, National Road Championships
1st Overall Vuelta a Mallorca
1st Stage 6 GP Marca
2nd Circuito de Getxo
3rd Overall Vuelta a Burgos
3rd Trofeo Jaumendreu
6th Trofeo Masferrer
7th Overall Volta a Catalunya
1948
1st Overall Volta a Tarragona

1st Stage 1

2nd Overall Vuelta a Mallorca
3rd Overall Vuelta a España
1949
1st Stage 10 Volta a Catalunya
1st Overall GP de Andalucia

1st Stage 1

2nd Road race, National Road Championships
2nd Trofeo Jaumendreu
7th Trofeo Masferrer
1950
1st Stage 6 Volta a Portugal
4th Trofeo Masferrer
7th Overall Vuelta a España

1st Stages 8a (ITT) & 21

1951
1st Stage 4 Volta a Catalunya
1952
2nd Trofeo Masferrer
