= Rik Evens =

Belgian bicycle racer

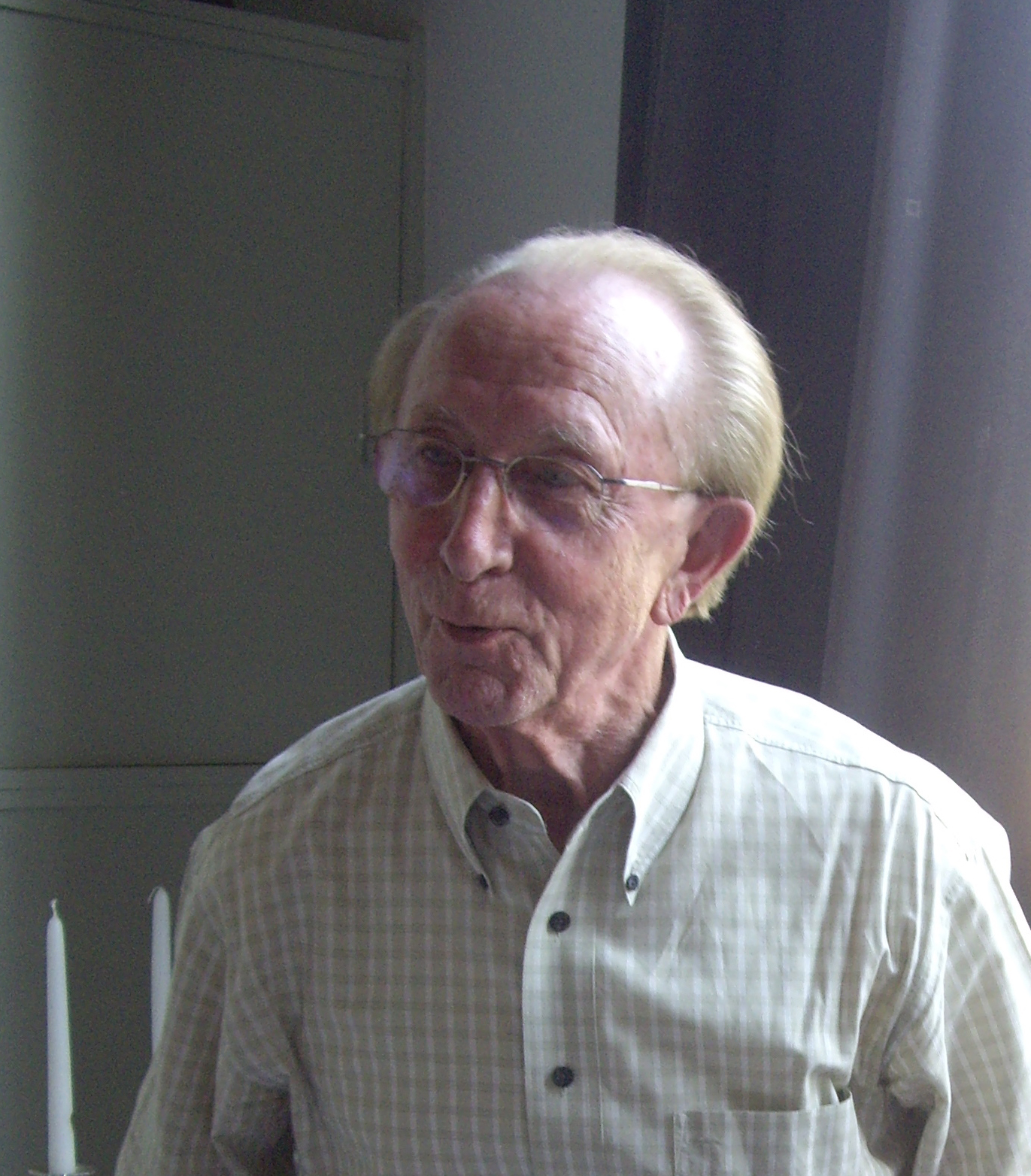

Personal information
- Born: 21 February 1927 Opitter, Bree, Belgium
- Died: 29 June 2022 (aged 95)

Cycling career
- Sport: Cycling
- Discipline: Road
- Role: Rider

Professional teams
- 1949–1950: Elvé–Météore
- 1951: Vredestein
- 1951–1952: Peugeot–Dunlop

Rik Evens (21 February 1927 – 29 June 2022) was a Belgian professional road cyclist. He most notably won two stages of the 1950 Vuelta a España.

== Major results ==
1949
4th Overall Tour de l'Ouest

1st Stage 5

1950
1st Stages 2 & 11 Vuelta a España
4th Overall Ronde van Nederland
5th Kampenhout–Charleroi–Kampenhout
8th Omloop Het Volk
