= Umberto Drei =

Italian cyclist

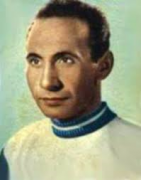

Personal information
- Born: 1 May 1925 Riolo dei Bagni, Italy
- Died: 14 January 1996 (aged 70) Riolo Terme, Italy

Cycling career
- Sport: Cycling
- Role: Rider

Umberto Drei (1 May 1925 – 14 January 1996) was an Italian racing cyclist. He rode in the 1948 Tour de France.
