= Victorio Ruiz García =

Spanish cyclist

Personal information
- Born: 30 April 1926 Canillejas, Spain

Cycling career
- Sport: Cycling
- Role: Rider

Victorio Ruiz García (born 30 April 1926) was a Spanish racing cyclist. He rode in the 1951 Tour de France.

== Major results ==
1950
1st Stage 20 Vuelta a España
1st Overall Vuelta a Salamanca
2nd GP Pascuas
1951
5th Overall GP de Andalucia
8th Trofeo Masferrer
1952
9th Overall GP Ayutamiento de Bilbao
9th Overall Vuelta a Castilla
1953
4th Clásica a los Puertos
1954
7th GP Pascuas
