= José Serra Gil =

Spanish cyclist (1923–2002)

Personal information
- Born: 23 December 1923 Amposta, Spain
- Died: 12 June 2002 (aged 78) Spain

Cycling career
- Sport: Cycling
- Discipline: Road
- Role: Rider

Professional teams
- 1948: UD Sans–Alas Color
- 1949: Peugeot–Dunlop
- 1950: Academico
- 1953: Metropole–Hutchinson
- 1953: Welter–Ursus
- 1954–1955: Splendid–d'Alessandro
- 1955: Feru
- 1955: Ignis
- 1956: Girardengo–Icep
- 1956–1958: Faema–Guerra
- 1957: Ignis–Doniselli

José Serra Gil (23 December 1923 – 12 June 2002) was a Spanish racing cyclist. He rode in the 1949 Tour de France.

== Major results ==
1947
5th Trofeo Jaumendreu
10th Overall Volta a Catalunya
1948
2nd Overall Volta a Tarragona
4th Overall Vuelta a Levante
6th Overall Volta a Catalunya

1st Stage 6

1949
1st Road race, National Road Championships
1st GP Pascuas
1st Stage 3 Gran Premio Cataluña
2nd Subida a Arrate
7th Overall Volta a Catalunya
1950
2nd Overall Volta a Catalunya

1st Stage 9

2nd Overall Vuelta a Castilla
3rd Overall Vuelta a España

1st Stages 10 & 19

5th Overall Volta a Portugal

1st Prologue

1951
4th Overall Volta a Catalunya
1952
2nd Overall Vuelta a Castilla
3rd Overall Volta a Catalunya
1953
3rd Overall Volta a Catalunya

1st Stage 4b (ITT)

7th Overall Critérium du Dauphiné Libéré
1954
1st Overall Euskal Bizikleta
6th Overall Volta a Catalunya

1st Stage 1

1955
3rd Road race, National Road Championships
7th Overall Vuelta a España
1956
9th Overall Vuelta a España
