= Euskal Bizikleta =

Road cycling race in Spain

Race details
- Date: Early-June
- Region: Basque Country, Spain
- English name: Basque Bicycle
- Local name(s): Euskal Bizikleta Kirol Elkartea (in Basque); Bicicleta Vasca (in Spanish)
- Discipline: Road
- Competition: UCI Europe Tour
- Type: Stage race

History
- First edition: 1991
- Editions: 18 (as of 2008)
- First winner: Louis Caput (FRA)
- Most recent: Eros Capecchi (ITA)

Euskal Bizikleta (Spanish: Bicicleta Vasca, English: Basque Bicycle) was an annual road cycling stage race held in the Basque Country in June. From 2005 to 2008, the race was organized as a 2.HC event on the UCI Europe Tour. In 2009, it was merged with the Tour of the Basque Country.

The first race was held in 1952, but it has only been called Euskal Bizikleta since 1991. The first winner (1952) was Louis Caput from France. The first winner of the 'modern' Euskal Bizikleta (1991) was Gianni Bugno. The most recent edition (2008) was won by Eros Capecchi from Italy.

== Winners ==
Year	Country	Rider	Team
1952	France	Louis Caput	
1953	Spain	Vicente Iturat	
1954	Spain	José Serra Gil	
1955	Spain	José Escolano	
1956	Spain	Jesús Loroño	
1957	Spain	Antonio Barrutia	
1958	Spain	Jesús Loroño	
1959	Spain	Antonio Bertrán	
1960	Spain	Benigno Aspuru	
1961	Spain	Antonio Karmany	
1962	West Germany	Rolf Wolfshohl	
1963	Spain	Juan José Sagarduy	
1964	Spain	Carlos Echeverría	
1965	Spain	Sebastian Elorza	
1966	Spain	Eusebio Vélez	
1967	Spain	Carlos Echeverría	
1968	Spain	José María Errandonea Urtizberea	
1987	Spain	Marino Lejarreta Arrizabalaga	
1988	Spain	Jokin Mújika	
1989	Spain	Federico Echave Musatadi	
1990	France	Thierry Claveyrolat	
1991	Italy	Gianni Bugno	
1992	Italy	Franco Chioccioli	
1993	Latvia	Piotr Ugrumov	
1994	Italy	Stefano Della Santa	
1995	Russia	Evgeni Berzin	
1996	Spain	Miguel Induráin	
1997	Spain	Abraham Olano	
1998	Spain	Abraham Olano	
1999	Spain	David Etxebarría	
2000	Spain	Haimar Zubeldia	
2001	Spain	Juan Carlos Domínguez	
2002	Spain	Mikel Zarrabeitia	
2003	Spain	José Antonio Pecharromán	
2004	Spain	Roberto Heras	
2005	Spain	Eladio Jiménez	
2006	Spain	Koldo Gil	
2007	Spain	Constantino Zaballa	
2008	Italy	Eros Capecchi	
