= Jesús Loroño =

Spanish cyclist (1926–1998)

Personal information
- Full name: Jesus Loroño Artega
- Born: 10 January 1926 Larrabetzu, Spain
- Died: 12 August 1998 (aged 72) Larrabetzu

Cycling career
- Sport: Cycling
- Discipline: Road
- Role: Rider
- Rider type: Climber

Major wins
- 1957 Vuelta a España; 1953 Tour de France King of Mountains

Jesus Loroño Artega (Larrabetzu, 10 January 1926 – Larrabetzu, 12 August 1998) was a Spanish professional road racing cyclist during the 1950s and early 1960s. Loroño is most famous for capturing the 1957 Vuelta a España. The previous year at the Vuelta, he finished second to Angelo Conterno by just 13 seconds.

== Major results ==
1947
Subida al Naranco
1949
Circuito de Getxo
Circuito Sardinero
1950
Circuito Sardinero
Vuelta a España:

10th place overall classification

1951
Circuito Sardinero
1953
Tour de France:

Winner Mountains classification
Winner stage 10

1954
Spain national hill climb championship
1955
Vuelta a España:

4th place overall classification

1956
GP de la Bicicleta Eibarresa
Vuelta a España:

2nd place overall classification

1957
1st Overall Vuelta a España

1st Stage 13

1st Overall Volta a Catalunya
5th Overall Tour de France
1958
GP de la Bicicleta Eibarresa
Vuelta a España:

Winner stage 13A (with Guido Carlesi)
8th place overall classification

Giro d'Italia:

7th place overall classification

1960
GP Mugica
Vuelta a España:

9th place overall classification
