= Andrés Trobat =

Spanish cyclist (1925–1999)

Personal information
- Born: 4 September 1925
- Died: 12 December 1999 (aged 74)

Cycling career
- Sport: Cycling
- Role: Rider

Andrés Trobat (4 September 1925 – 12 December 1999) was a Spanish racing cyclist. He rode in the 1952 Tour de France.
