= Manuel Rodríguez (cyclist) =

Spanish cyclist (1926–1997)

Personal information
- Full name: Manuel Rodríguez Barros
- Born: 13 August 1926
- Died: 20 October 1997 (aged 71)

Cycling career
- Sport: Cycling
- Role: Rider

Manuel Rodríguez Barros (13 August 1926 – 20 October 1997) was a Spanish racing cyclist. He rode in the 1951 Tour de France.
