= Antonio Gelabert =

Spanish cyclist (1921–1956)

Personal information
- Full name: Antonio Gelabert Amengual
- Born: 7 September 1921 Santa Maria del Camí, Spain
- Died: 13 December 1956 (aged 35) Palma de Mallorca, Spain

Cycling career
- Sport: Cycling
- Discipline: Road
- Role: Rider

Major wins
- Spain national champion (2x); 3 stages Vuelta a España; 1 stage Tour de France

Antonio Gelabert Amengual (7 September 1921 in Santa Maria del Camí – 13 December 1956 in Palma de Mallorca) was a Spanish professional road bicycle racer. He became Spanish national champion in 1950 and 1955.

== Major results ==
1949
Trofeo Jaumendreu
1950
(Spain) Spanish National Road Race Championship
Volta a Catalunya
Vuelta a España:

Winner stages 5 and 18

1952
Tour de France:

10th place overall classification

Clásica a los Puertos de Guadarrama
GP Pascuas
Vuelta a Castilla
1953
Vuelta a Asturias
1955
(Spain) Spanish National Road Race Championship
Vuelta a España:

Winner stage 3
