= 1958 Tour de France, Stage 13 to Stage 24 =

Cycling race stages

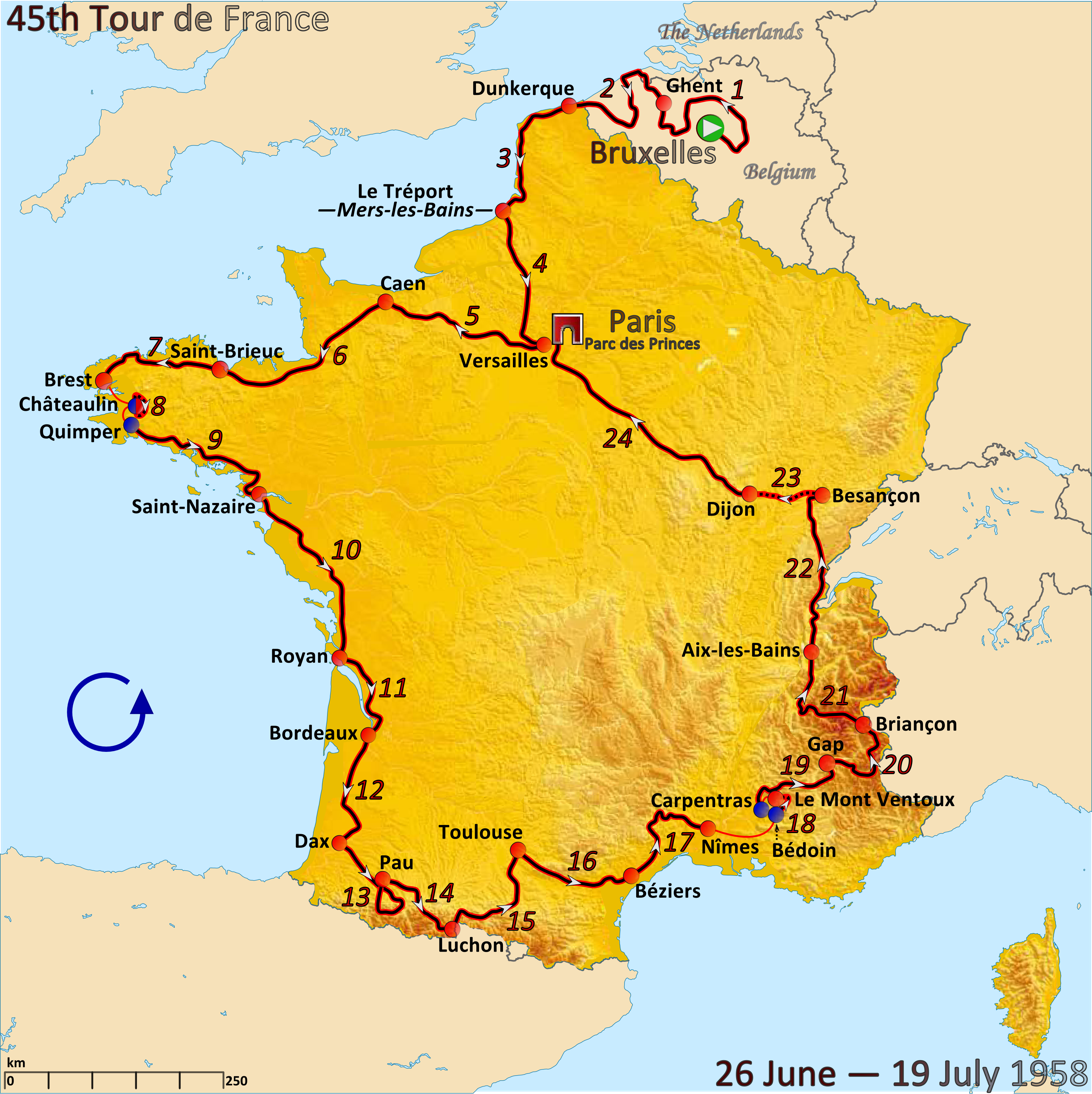
Route of the 1958 Tour de France

The 1958 Tour de France was the 45th edition of Tour de France, one of cycling's Grand Tours. The Tour began in Brussels with a flat stage on 26 June and Stage 13 occurred on 8 July with a mountainous stage from Dax. The race finished in Paris on 19 July.

== Stage 13 ==
8 July 1958 - Dax to Pau, 230 km (142.9 mi)

Stage 13 result

Rank	Rider	Team	Time
1	Louis Bergaud (FRA)	France	6h 15' 48"
2	Piet Damen (NED)	Netherlands/Luxembourg	s.t.
3	André Vlayen (BEL)	Belgium	+ 3' 03"
4	Louison Bobet (FRA)	France	s.t.
5	Gilbert Bauvin (FRA)	France	s.t.
6	Brian Robinson (GBR)	International	s.t.
7	Jean Brankart (BEL)	Belgium	s.t.
8	Gianni Ferlenghi (ITA)	Italy	s.t.
9	Jean Bourlès (FRA)	France – West/South-West	s.t.
10	Marcel Rohrbach (FRA)	France – Centre-Midi	s.t.

General classification after stage 13

Rank	Rider	Team	Time
1	Raphaël Géminiani (FRA)	France – Centre-Midi	60h 51' 40"
2	Vito Favero (ITA)	Italy	+ 3"
3	François Mahé (FRA)	France	+ 21"
4	Jean Graczyk (FRA)	France – Centre-Midi	+ 26"
5	Gilbert Desmet (BEL)	Belgium	+ 2' 44"
6	Gilbert Bauvin (FRA)	France	+ 4' 36"
7	Jef Planckaert (BEL)	Belgium	+ 5' 13"
8	Salvador Botella (ESP)	Spain	+ 6' 13"
9	André Darrigade (FRA)	France	+ 6' 56"
10	Jacques Anquetil (FRA)	France	+ 8' 19"

== Stage 14 ==
9 July 1958 - Pau to Luchon, 129 km (80 mi)

Stage 14 result

Rank	Rider	Team	Time
1	Federico Bahamontes (ESP)	Spain	3h 35' 22"
2	Vito Favero (ITA)	Italy	+ 1' 58"
3	Gilbert Bauvin (FRA)	France	s.t.
4	Jacques Anquetil (FRA)	France	s.t.
5	Jean-Pierre Schmitz (LUX)	Netherlands/Luxembourg	s.t.
6	Brian Robinson (GBR)	International	s.t.
7	Jean Brankart (BEL)	Belgium	s.t.
8	Gastone Nencini (ITA)	Italy	s.t.
9	Raphaël Géminiani (FRA)	France – Centre-Midi	s.t.
10	Charly Gaul (LUX)	Netherlands/Luxembourg	s.t.

General classification after stage 14

Rank	Rider	Team	Time
1	Vito Favero (ITA)	Italy	64h 28' 33"
2	Raphaël Géminiani (FRA)	France – Centre-Midi	+ 27"
3	François Mahé (FRA)	France	+ 3' 55"
4	Jean Graczyk (FRA)	France – Centre-Midi	+ 4' 00"
5	Gilbert Bauvin (FRA)	France	+ 5' 03"
6	Gilbert Desmet (BEL)	Belgium	+ 5' 25"
7	Jef Planckaert (BEL)	Belgium	+ 8' 27"
8	Jacques Anquetil (FRA)	France	+ 8' 46"
9	Salvador Botella (ESP)	Spain	+ 9' 47"
10	Charly Gaul (LUX)	Netherlands/Luxembourg	+ 10' 11"

== Stage 15 ==
10 July 1958 - Luchon to Toulouse, 176 km (109 mi)

Stage 15 result

Rank	Rider	Team	Time
1	André Darrigade (FRA)	France	4h 40' 41"
2	Vito Favero (ITA)	Italy	s.t.
3	Arigo Padovan (ITA)	Italy	s.t.
4	Gilbert Bauvin (FRA)	France	s.t.
5	Piet van Est (NED)	Netherlands/Luxembourg	s.t.
6	Gastone Nencini (ITA)	Italy	s.t.
7	Joseph Groussard (FRA)	France	s.t.
8	Édouard Delberghe (FRA)	France – Paris/North-East	s.t.
9	Georges Gay (FRA)	France – Centre-Midi	s.t.
10	Jacques Anquetil (FRA)	France	s.t.

General classification after stage 15

Rank	Rider	Team	Time
1	Vito Favero (ITA)	Italy	69h 08' 44"
2	Raphaël Géminiani (FRA)	France – Centre-Midi	+ 57"
3	Gilbert Bauvin (FRA)	France	+ 5' 33"
4	Gilbert Desmet (BEL)	Belgium	+ 5' 55"
5	Jef Planckaert (BEL)	Belgium	+ 8' 57"
6	Jacques Anquetil (FRA)	France	+ 9' 16"
7	Salvador Botella (ESP)	Spain	+ 10' 17"
8	Charly Gaul (LUX)	Netherlands/Luxembourg	+ 10' 41"
9	Brian Robinson (GBR)	International	+ 11' 01"
10	Louison Bobet (FRA)	France	+ 11' 22"

== Stage 16 ==
11 July 1958 - Toulouse to Béziers, 187 km (116 mi)

Stage 16 result

Rank	Rider	Team	Time
1	Pierino Baffi (ITA)	Italy	5h 27' 34"
2	Jean Dacquay (FRA)	France – Paris/North-East	s.t.
3	Jean Graczyk (FRA)	France – Centre-Midi	+ 2' 42"
4	Pietro Nascimbene (ITA)	Italy	s.t.
5	Emmanuel Busto (FRA)	France – Centre-Midi	s.t.
6	Wim van Est (NED)	Netherlands/Luxembourg	+ 6' 09"
7	Arigo Padovan (ITA)	Italy	s.t.
8	Gastone Nencini (ITA)	Italy	s.t.
9	Horst Tueller (FRG)	Switzerland/Germany	s.t.
10	Piet van Est (NED)	Netherlands/Luxembourg	s.t.

General classification after stage 16

Rank	Rider	Team	Time
1	Vito Favero (ITA)	Italy	74h 42' 27"
2	Raphaël Géminiani (FRA)	France – Centre-Midi	+ 57"
3	Gilbert Bauvin (FRA)	France	+ 5' 33"
4	Gilbert Desmet (BEL)	Belgium	+ 5' 55"
5	Jef Planckaert (BEL)	Belgium	+ 8' 57"
6	Jacques Anquetil (FRA)	France	+ 9' 16"
7	Salvador Botella (ESP)	Spain	+ 10' 17"
8	Charly Gaul (LUX)	Netherlands/Luxembourg	+ 10' 41"
9	Brian Robinson (GBR)	International	+ 11' 01"
10	Louison Bobet (FRA)	France	+ 11' 22"

== Stage 17 ==
12 July 1958 - Béziers to Nîmes, 189 km (117 mi)

Stage 17 result

Rank	Rider	Team	Time
1	André Darrigade (FRA)	France	5h 10' 15"
2	Joseph Groussard (FRA)	France	s.t.
3	Salvador Botella (ESP)	Spain	s.t.
4	Antonin Rolland (FRA)	France – Centre-Midi	s.t.
5	Hans Andresen (DEN)	International	s.t.
6	Jos Hoevenaers (BEL)	Belgium	s.t.
7	Joseph Morvan (FRA)	France – West/South-West	s.t.
8	Jean Dotto (FRA)	France – Centre-Midi	+ 2"
9	Roger Chaussabel (FRA)	France – Centre-Midi	s.t.
10	Federico Bahamontes (ESP)	Spain	s.t.

General classification after stage 17

Rank	Rider	Team	Time
1	Vito Favero (ITA)	Italy	79h 57' 29"
2	Raphaël Géminiani (FRA)	France – Centre-Midi	+ 57"
3	Salvador Botella (ESP)	Spain	+ 5' 30"
4	Gilbert Bauvin (FRA)	France	+ 5' 33"
5	Gilbert Desmet (BEL)	Belgium	+ 5' 55"
6	André Darrigade (FRA)	France	+ 8' 20"
7	Jef Planckaert (BEL)	Belgium	+ 8' 57"
8	Jacques Anquetil (FRA)	France	+ 9' 16"
9	Charly Gaul (LUX)	Netherlands/Luxembourg	+ 10' 41"
10	Brian Robinson (GBR)	International	+ 11' 01"

== Stage 18 ==
13 July 1958 - Bédoin to Mont-Ventoux, 21 km (13 mi) (ITT)

Stage 18 result

Rank	Rider	Team	Time
1	Charly Gaul (LUX)	Netherlands/Luxembourg	1h 02' 09"
2	Federico Bahamontes (ESP)	Spain	+ 31"
3	Jean Dotto (FRA)	France – Centre-Midi	+ 2' 53"
4	Jean Brankart (BEL)	Belgium	+ 2' 57"
5	Marcel Rohrbach (FRA)	France – Centre-Midi	+ 3' 23"
6	Jef Planckaert (BEL)	Belgium	+ 3' 52"
7	Jacques Anquetil (FRA)	France	+ 4' 09"
8	Jean-Claude Annaert (FRA)	France – Paris/North-East	+ 4' 13"
9	Jean-Pierre Schmitz (LUX)	Netherlands/Luxembourg	+ 4' 53"
10	Louison Bobet (FRA)	France	+ 4' 54"

General classification after stage 18

Rank	Rider	Team	Time
1	Raphaël Géminiani (FRA)	France – Centre-Midi	81h 05' 36"
2	Vito Favero (ITA)	Italy	+ 2' 01"
3	Charly Gaul (LUX)	Netherlands/Luxembourg	+ 3' 43"
4	Gilbert Desmet (BEL)	Belgium	+ 6' 08"
5	Jef Planckaert (BEL)	Belgium	+ 6' 51"
6	Jacques Anquetil (FRA)	France	+ 7' 27"
7	Jean Brankart (BEL)	Belgium	+ 8' 57"
8	Gilbert Bauvin (FRA)	France	+ 9' 05"
9	Salvador Botella (ESP)	Spain	+ 9' 24"
10	André Darrigade (FRA)	France	+ 9' 56"

== Stage 19 ==
14 July 1958 - Carpentras to Gap, 178 km (111 mi)

Stage 19 result

Rank	Rider	Team	Time
1	Gastone Nencini (ITA)	Italy	4h 53' 18"
2	Raphaël Géminiani (FRA)	France – Centre-Midi	s.t.
3	Jacques Anquetil (FRA)	France	s.t.
4	Jan Adriaensens (BEL)	Belgium	s.t.
5	Salvador Botella (ESP)	Spain	+ 15"
6	Joseph Morvan (FRA)	France – West/South-West	+ 44"
7	Vito Favero (ITA)	Italy	+ 46"
8	Emilio Bottecchia (ITA)	Italy	+ 50"
9	Jos Hoevenaers (BEL)	Belgium	+ 3' 48"
10	Louis Bergaud (FRA)	France	s.t.

General classification after stage 19

Rank	Rider	Team	Time
1	Raphaël Géminiani (FRA)	France – Centre-Midi	85h 58' 24"
2	Vito Favero (ITA)	Italy	+ 3' 17"
3	Jacques Anquetil (FRA)	France	+ 7' 57"
4	Salvador Botella (ESP)	Spain	+ 10' 09"
5	Jan Adriaensens (BEL)	Belgium	+ 12' 44"
6	Gastone Nencini (ITA)	Italy	+ 14' 24"
7	Jef Planckaert (BEL)	Belgium	+ 14' 47"
8	Charly Gaul (LUX)	Netherlands/Luxembourg	+ 15' 12"
9	Louison Bobet (FRA)	France	+ 16' 55"
10	Gilbert Desmet (BEL)	Belgium	+ 17' 37"

== Stage 20 ==
15 July 1958 - Gap to Briançon, 165 km (103 mi)

Stage 20 result

Rank	Rider	Team	Time
1	Federico Bahamontes (ESP)	Spain	5h 18' 35"
2	Antonino Catalano (ITA)	Italy	+ 50"
3	Gastone Nencini (ITA)	Italy	+ 2' 02"
4	Jacques Anquetil (FRA)	France	+ 3' 51"
5	Jan Adriaensens (BEL)	Belgium	+ 3' 52"
6	Jos Hoevenaers (BEL)	Belgium	+ 3' 55"
7	Raphaël Géminiani (FRA)	France – Centre-Midi	+ 3' 56"
8	Charly Gaul (LUX)	Netherlands/Luxembourg	+ 4' 17"
9	Vito Favero (ITA)	Italy	+ 4' 26"
10	Pierre Polo (FRA)	France – Centre-Midi	+ 5' 32"

General classification after stage 20

Rank	Rider	Team	Time
1	Raphaël Géminiani (FRA)	France – Centre-Midi	91h 20' 55"
2	Vito Favero (ITA)	Italy	+ 3' 47"
3	Jacques Anquetil (FRA)	France	+ 7' 52"
4	Gastone Nencini (ITA)	Italy	+ 12' 30"
5	Jan Adriaensens (BEL)	Belgium	+ 12' 40"
6	Charly Gaul (LUX)	Netherlands/Luxembourg	+ 16' 03"
7	Federico Bahamontes (ESP)	Spain	+ 19' 34"
8	Salvador Botella (ESP)	Spain	+ 20' 14"
9	Louison Bobet (FRA)	France	+ 20' 15"
10	Jos Hoevenaers (BEL)	Belgium	+ 21' 31"

== Stage 21 ==
16 July 1958 - Briançon to Aix-les-Bains, 219 km (136 mi)

Stage 21 result

Rank	Rider	Team	Time
1	Charly Gaul (LUX)	Netherlands/Luxembourg	6h 59' 10"
2	Jan Adriaensens (BEL)	Belgium	+ 7' 50"
3	Vito Favero (ITA)	Italy	+ 10' 09"
4	Gianni Ferlenghi (ITA)	Italy	+ 12' 20"
5	Jef Planckaert (BEL)	Belgium	+ 14' 34"
6	Piet Damen (NED)	Netherlands/Luxembourg	s.t.
7	Raphaël Géminiani (FRA)	France – Centre-Midi	+ 14' 35"
8	Jean Dotto (FRA)	France – Centre-Midi	+ 14' 41"
9	Gastone Nencini (ITA)	Italy	+ 19' 01"
10	Louison Bobet (FRA)	France	s.t.

General classification after stage 21

Rank	Rider	Team	Time
1	Vito Favero (ITA)	Italy	98h 34' 01"
2	Raphaël Géminiani (FRA)	France – Centre-Midi	+ 39"
3	Charly Gaul (LUX)	Netherlands/Luxembourg	+ 1' 07"
4	Jan Adriaensens (BEL)	Belgium	+ 6' 04"
5	Jacques Anquetil (FRA)	France	+ 17' 10"
6	Gastone Nencini (ITA)	Italy	+ 17' 35"
7	Louison Bobet (FRA)	France	+ 25' 20"
8	Jef Planckaert (BEL)	Belgium	+ 25' 51"
9	Jean Dotto (FRA)	France – Centre-Midi	+ 26' 14"
10	Federico Bahamontes (ESP)	Spain	+ 35' 33"

== Stage 22 ==
17 July 1958 - Aix-les-Bains to Besançon, 237 km (147 mi)

Stage 22 result

Rank	Rider	Team	Time
1	André Darrigade (FRA)	France	7h 15' 01"
2	Gastone Nencini (ITA)	Italy	s.t.
3	Gerrit Voorting (NED)	Netherlands/Luxembourg	s.t.
4	Pierino Baffi (ITA)	Italy	+ 1' 05"
5	Jean Graczyk (FRA)	France – Centre-Midi	s.t.
6	Hans Andresen (DEN)	International	s.t.
7	Jaap Kersten (NED)	Netherlands/Luxembourg	s.t.
8	Jean-Claude Annaert (FRA)	France – Paris/North-East	s.t.
9	Pietro Nascimbene (ITA)	Italy	s.t.
10	Lothar Friedrich (FRG)	Switzerland/Germany	s.t.

General classification after stage 22

Rank	Rider	Team	Time
1	Vito Favero (ITA)	Italy	105h 52' 45"
2	Raphaël Géminiani (FRA)	France – Centre-Midi	+ 39"
3	Charly Gaul (LUX)	Netherlands/Luxembourg	+ 1' 07"
4	Jan Adriaensens (BEL)	Belgium	+ 6' 04"
5	Gastone Nencini (ITA)	Italy	+ 13' 22"
6	Jacques Anquetil (FRA)	France	+ 17' 10"
7	Louison Bobet (FRA)	France	+ 25' 20"
8	Jef Planckaert (BEL)	Belgium	+ 25' 51"
9	Jean Dotto (FRA)	France – Centre-Midi	+ 26' 14"
10	Federico Bahamontes (ESP)	Spain	+ 35' 33"

== Stage 23 ==
18 July 1958 - Besançon to Dijon, 74 km (46 mi) (ITT)

Stage 23 result

Rank	Rider	Team	Time
1	Charly Gaul (LUX)	Netherlands/Luxembourg	1h 40' 27"
2	Gastone Nencini (ITA)	Italy	+ 48"
3	Jan Adriaensens (BEL)	Belgium	+ 1' 19"
4	Jef Planckaert (BEL)	Belgium	+ 2' 17"
5	Raphaël Géminiani (FRA)	France – Centre-Midi	+ 3' 09"
6	Jesús Galdeano (ESP)	Spain	+ 3' 14"
7	Vito Favero (ITA)	Italy	+ 3' 17"
8	André Darrigade (FRA)	France	+ 3' 19"
9	Jean-Pierre Schmitz (LUX)	Netherlands/Luxembourg	+ 3' 42"
10	Antonio Suárez (ESP)	Spain	+ 3' 56"

General classification after stage 23

Rank	Rider	Team	Time
1	Charly Gaul (LUX)	Netherlands/Luxembourg	107h 33' 19"
2	Vito Favero (ITA)	Italy	+ 3' 10"
3	Raphaël Géminiani (FRA)	France – Centre-Midi	+ 3' 41"
4	Jan Adriaensens (BEL)	Belgium	+ 7' 16"
5	Gastone Nencini (ITA)	Italy	+ 13' 33"
6	Jef Planckaert (BEL)	Belgium	+ 28' 01"
7	Louison Bobet (FRA)	France	+ 31' 39"
8	Federico Bahamontes (ESP)	Spain	+ 40' 26"
9	Louis Bergaud (FRA)	France	+ 48' 33"
10	Jos Hoevenaers (BEL)	Belgium	+ 58' 26"

== Stage 24 ==
19 July 1958 - Dijon to Paris, 320 km (200 mi)

Stage 24 result

Rank	Rider	Team	Time
1	Pierino Baffi (ITA)	Italy	9h 25' 46"
2	Jean Graczyk (FRA)	France – Centre-Midi	s.t.
3	Gastone Nencini (ITA)	Italy	s.t.
4	Arigo Padovan (ITA)	Italy	s.t.
5	Jean Gainche (FRA)	France – West/South-West	s.t.
6	Martin Van Geneugden (BEL)	Belgium	s.t.
7	Ernst Traxel (SUI)	Switzerland/Germany	s.t.
8	Gerrit Voorting (NED)	Netherlands/Luxembourg	s.t.
9	Joseph Groussard (FRA)	France	s.t.
10	Jos Hoevenaers (BEL)	Belgium	s.t.

General classification after stage 24

Rank	Rider	Team	Time
1	Charly Gaul (LUX)	Netherlands/Luxembourg	116h 59' 05"
2	Vito Favero (ITA)	Italy	+ 3' 10"
3	Raphaël Géminiani (FRA)	France – Centre-Midi	+ 3' 41"
4	Jan Adriaensens (BEL)	Belgium	+ 7' 16"
5	Gastone Nencini (ITA)	Italy	+ 13' 33"
6	Jef Planckaert (BEL)	Belgium	+ 28' 01"
7	Louison Bobet (FRA)	France	+ 31' 39"
8	Federico Bahamontes (ESP)	Spain	+ 40' 44"
9	Louis Bergaud (FRA)	France	+ 48' 33"
10	Jos Hoevenaers (BEL)	Belgium	+ 58' 26"
