= 1958 Tour de France, Stage 1 to Stage 12 =

Cycling race stages

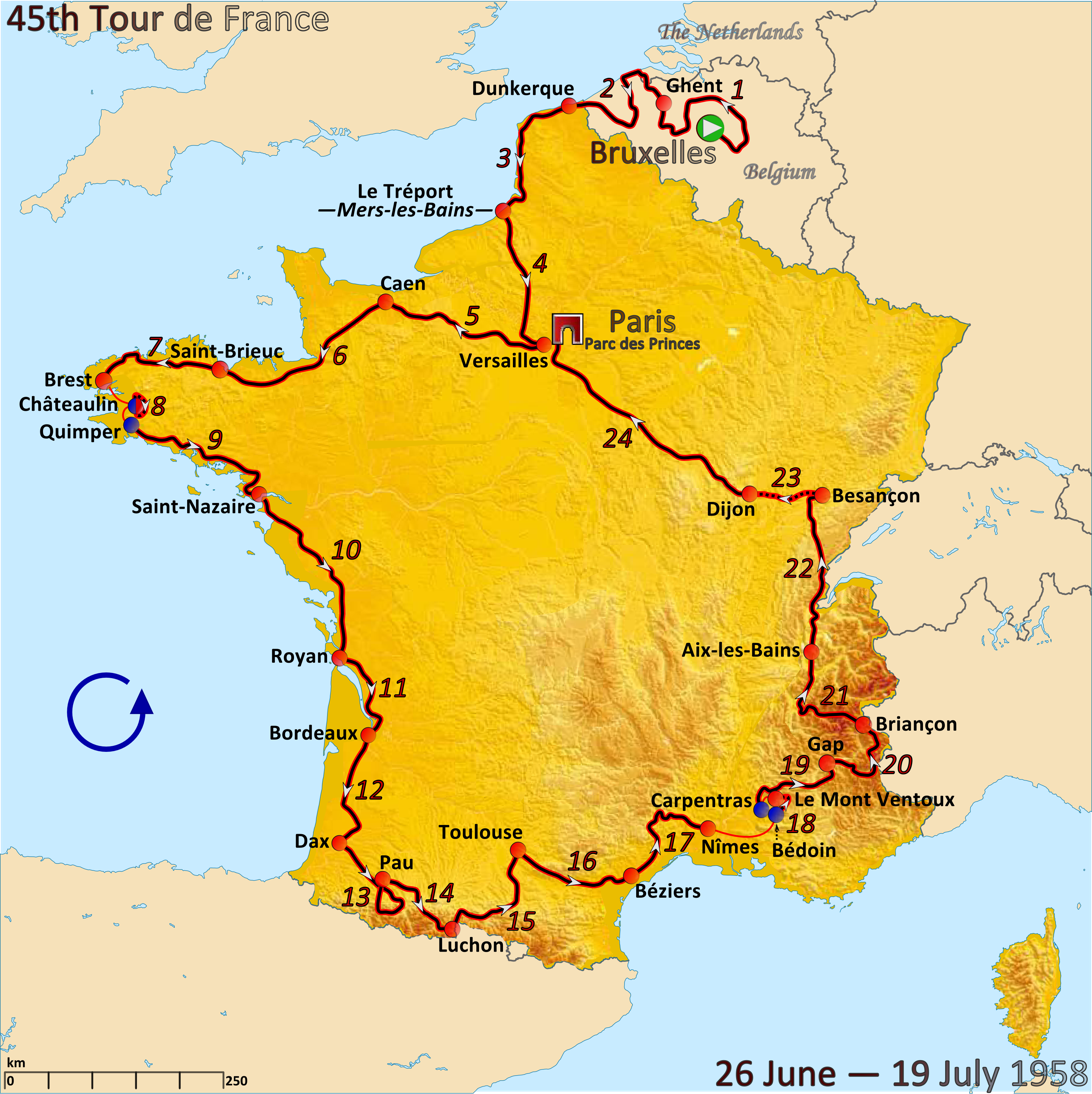
Route of the 1958 Tour de France

The 1958 Tour de France was the 45th edition of Tour de France, one of cycling's Grand Tours. The Tour began in Brussels with a flat stage on 26 June and Stage 12 occurred on 7 July with a flat stage to Dax. The race finished in Paris on 19 July.

== Stage 1 ==
26 June 1958 - Brussels to Ghent, 184 km (114.3 mi)

Stage 1 result

Rank	Rider	Team	Time
1	André Darrigade (FRA)	France	4h 33' 12"
2	Jos Hoevenaers (BEL)	Belgium	s.t.
3	Jef Planckaert (BEL)	Belgium	+ 3"
4	Jean Graczyk (FRA)	France – Centre-Midi	+ 1' 15"
5	Rizzardo Brenioli (ITA)	Italy	+ 1' 17"
6	Pierre Polo (FRA)	France – Centre-Midi	+ 1' 20"
7	Seamus Elliott (IRL)	International	+ 1' 35"
8	Pierino Baffi (ITA)	Italy	s.t.
9	Noël Foré (BEL)	Belgium	s.t.
10	Rik Luyten (BEL)	Belgium	s.t.

General classification after stage 1

Rank	Rider	Team	Time
1	André Darrigade (FRA)	France	4h 33' 12"
2	Jos Hoevenaers (BEL)	Belgium	+ 30"
3	Jef Planckaert (BEL)	Belgium	+ 1' 03"
4	Jean Graczyk (FRA)	France – Centre-Midi	+ 2' 15"
5	Rizzardo Brenioli (ITA)	Italy	+ 2' 17"
6	Pierre Polo (FRA)	France – Centre-Midi	+ 2' 20"
7	Seamus Elliott (IRL)	International	+ 2' 35"
8	Pierino Baffi (ITA)	Italy	s.t.
9	Noël Foré (BEL)	Belgium	s.t.
10	Rik Luyten (BEL)	Belgium	s.t.

== Stage 2 ==
27 June 1958 - Ghent to Dunkirk, 198 km (123.0 mi)

Stage 2 result

Rank	Rider	Team	Time
1	Gerrit Voorting (NED)	Netherlands/Luxembourg	5h 12' 02"
2	Pierino Baffi (ITA)	Italy	s.t.
3	Seamus Elliott (IRL)	International	s.t.
4	Martin Van Geneugden (BEL)	Belgium	s.t.
5	Jean Graczyk (FRA)	France – Centre-Midi	s.t.
6	Jos Hoevenaers (BEL)	Belgium	s.t.
7	Jean-Claude Annaert (FRA)	France – Paris/North-East	s.t.
8	Piet van Est (NED)	Netherlands/Luxembourg	s.t.
9	Wim van Est (NED)	Netherlands/Luxembourg	s.t.
10	Stanislas Bober (FRA)	France – Paris/North-East	s.t.

General classification after stage 2

Rank	Rider	Team	Time
1	Jos Hoevenaers (BEL)	Belgium	9h 44' 44"
2	André Darrigade (FRA)	France	+ 1' 10"
3	Gerrit Voorting (NED)	Netherlands/Luxembourg	+ 1' 21"
4	Pierino Baffi (ITA)	Italy	+ 1' 35"
5	Jean Graczyk (FRA)	France – Centre-Midi	+ 1' 45"
6	Günther Debusmann (FRG)	Switzerland/Germany	+ 2' 05"
7	Seamus Elliott (IRL)	International	s.t.
8	Marcel Rohrbach (FRA)	France – Centre-Midi	s.t.
9	Jef Planckaert (BEL)	Belgium	+ 2' 13"
10	François Mahé (FRA)	France	+ 2' 21"

== Stage 3 ==
28 June 1958 - Dunkirk to Mers-les-Bains, 177 km (110 mi)

Stage 3 result

Rank	Rider	Team	Time
1	Gilbert Bauvin (FRA)	France	5h 04' 04"
2	Noël Foré (BEL)	Belgium	s.t.
3	Vito Favero (ITA)	Italy	s.t.
4	Wim van Est (NED)	Netherlands/Luxembourg	s.t.
5	Jean-Claude Annaert (FRA)	France – Paris/North-East	s.t.
6	Fernand Lamy (FRA)	France – Paris/North-East	s.t.
7	Jean Stablinski (FRA)	France	s.t.
8	Francisco Moreno (ESP)	Spain	+ 5' 07"
9	Emilio Bottecchia (ITA)	Italy	s.t.
10	Henry Anglade (FRA)	France – Centre-Midi	s.t.

General classification after stage 3

Rank	Rider	Team	Time
1	Wim van Est (NED)	Netherlands/Luxembourg	14h 31' 18"
2	Gilbert Bauvin (FRA)	France	+ 40"
3	Noël Foré (BEL)	Belgium	+ 54"
4	Vito Favero (ITA)	Italy	+ 1' 55"
5	Jos Hoevenaers (BEL)	Belgium	+ 3' 44"
6	André Darrigade (FRA)	France	+ 4' 54"
7	Gerrit Voorting (NED)	Netherlands/Luxembourg	+ 5' 05"
8	Pierino Baffi (ITA)	Italy	+ 5' 19"
9	Emilio Bottecchia (ITA)	Italy	+ 5' 22"
10	Piet De Jongh (NED)	Netherlands/Luxembourg	s.t.

== Stage 4 ==
29 June 1958 - Le Tréport to Versailles, 205 km (127 mi)

Stage 4 result

Rank	Rider	Team	Time
1	Jean Gainche (FRA)	France – West/South-West	5h 04' 04"
2	André Darrigade (FRA)	France	s.t.
3	Jean Graczyk (FRA)	France – Centre-Midi	s.t.
4	Pierino Baffi (ITA)	Italy	s.t.
5	Joseph Thomin (FRA)	France – West/South-West	s.t.
6	Jef Planckaert (BEL)	Belgium	s.t.
7	Nicolas Barone (FRA)	France – Paris/North-East	s.t.
8	Gerrit Voorting (NED)	Netherlands/Luxembourg	s.t.
9	Jean-Pierre Schmitz (LUX)	Netherlands/Luxembourg	s.t.
10	André Vlayen (BEL)	Belgium	s.t.

General classification after stage 4

Rank	Rider	Team	Time
1	Wim van Est (NED)	Netherlands/Luxembourg	19h 37' 16"
2	Gilbert Bauvin (FRA)	France	+ 40"
3	Noël Foré (BEL)	Belgium	+ 54"
4	Jos Hoevenaers (BEL)	Belgium	+ 1' 50"
5	Vito Favero (ITA)	Italy	+ 1' 55"
6	André Darrigade (FRA)	France	+ 2' 30"
7	Gerrit Voorting (NED)	Netherlands/Luxembourg	+ 3' 11"
8	Pierino Baffi (ITA)	Italy	+ 3' 25"
9	Jean Graczyk (FRA)	France – Centre-Midi	+ 3' 35"
10	Jef Planckaert (BEL)	Belgium	+ 4' 03"

== Stage 5 ==
30 June 1958 - Versailles to Caen, 232 km (144 mi)

Stage 5 result

Rank	Rider	Team	Time
1	Tino Sabbadini (FRA)	France – West/South-West	5h 29' 44"
2	Louison Bobet (FRA)	France	s.t.
3	Gastone Nencini (ITA)	Italy	s.t.
4	Marcel Ernzer (NED)	Netherlands/Luxembourg	s.t.
5	Raphaël Géminiani (FRA)	France – Centre-Midi	s.t.
6	Jef Planckaert (BEL)	Belgium	s.t.
7	Jacques Anquetil (FRA)	France	s.t.
8	Gilbert Bauvin (FRA)	France	s.t.
9	Jean Graczyk (FRA)	France – Centre-Midi	+ 2' 02"
10	André Darrigade (FRA)	France	s.t.

General classification after stage 5

Rank	Rider	Team	Time
1	Gilbert Bauvin (FRA)	France	25h 07' 40"
2	Jef Planckaert (BEL)	Belgium	+ 3' 23"
3	André Darrigade (FRA)	France	+ 3' 52"
4	Gerrit Voorting (NED)	Netherlands/Luxembourg	+ 4' 33"
5	Jean Graczyk (FRA)	France – Centre-Midi	+ 4' 57"
6	Jan Adriaensens (BEL)	Belgium	+ 5' 33"
7	François Mahé (FRA)	France	s.t.
8	Tino Sabbadini (FRA)	France – West/South-West	+ 6' 05"
9	Jean Gainche (FRA)	France – West/South-West	+ 6' 13"
10	Louison Bobet (FRA)	France	+ 6' 35"

== Stage 6 ==
1 July 1958 - Caen to Saint-Brieuc, 223 km (139 mi)

Stage 6 result

Rank	Rider	Team	Time
1	Martin Van Geneugden (BEL)	Belgium	5h 21' 45"
2	Seamus Elliott (IRL)	International	s.t.
3	Vito Favero (ITA)	Italy	s.t.
4	Gilbert Desmet (BEL)	Belgium	s.t.
5	Nicolas Barone (FRA)	France – Paris/North-East	s.t.
6	Salvador Botella (ESP)	Spain	s.t.
7	Gerrit Voorting (NED)	Netherlands/Luxembourg	s.t.
8	François Mahé (FRA)	France	s.t.
9	Emmanuel Busto (FRA)	France – Centre-Midi	s.t.
10	Raphaël Géminiani (FRA)	France – Centre-Midi	s.t.

General classification after stage 6

Rank	Rider	Team	Time
1	Gerrit Voorting (NED)	Netherlands/Luxembourg	30h 33' 58"
2	François Mahé (FRA)	France	+ 1"
3	Raphaël Géminiani (FRA)	France – Centre-Midi	+ 2' 32"
4	Gilbert Desmet (BEL)	Belgium	+ 4' 49"
5	Salvador Botella (ESP)	Spain	s.t.
6	Gilbert Bauvin (FRA)	France	+ 6' 18"
7	Joseph Morvan (FRA)	France – West/South-West	+ 7' 20"
8	Nicolas Barone (FRA)	France – Paris/North-East	+ 8' 50"
9	Vito Favero (ITA)	Italy	+ 9' 28"
10	Jef Planckaert (BEL)	Belgium	+ 9' 41"

== Stage 7 ==
2 July 1958 - Saint-Brieuc to Brest, 170 km (110 mi)

Stage 7 result

Rank	Rider	Team	Time
1	Brian Robinson (GBR)	International	4h 03' 31"
2	Arigo Padovan (ITA)	Italy	s.t.
3	Jean Dotto (FRA)	France – Centre-Midi	+ 8"
4	Jean-Claude Annaert (FRA)	France – Paris/North-East	+ 1' 35"
5	Piet Damen (NED)	Netherlands/Luxembourg	s.t.
6	Jef Lahaye (NED)	Netherlands/Luxembourg	s.t.
7	Federico Bahamontes (ESP)	Spain	s.t.
8	Jean Graczyk (FRA)	France – Centre-Midi	+ 2' 32"
9	Rizzardo Brenioli (ITA)	Italy	+ 2' 34"
10	Maurice Moucheraud (FRA)	France – Paris/North-East	s.t.

General classification after stage 7

Rank	Rider	Team	Time
1	Gerrit Voorting (NED)	Netherlands/Luxembourg	34h 40' 55"
2	François Mahé (FRA)	France	+ 1"
3	Raphaël Géminiani (FRA)	France – Centre-Midi	+ 2' 32"
4	Gilbert Desmet (BEL)	Belgium	+ 4' 49"
5	Salvador Botella (ESP)	Spain	s.t.
6	Gilbert Bauvin (FRA)	France	+ 6' 18"
7	Joseph Morvan (FRA)	France – West/South-West	+ 7' 20"
8	Nicolas Barone (FRA)	France – Paris/North-East	+ 8' 50"
9	Vito Favero (ITA)	Italy	+ 9' 28"
10	Jef Planckaert (BEL)	Belgium	+ 9' 41"

== Stage 8 ==
3 July 1958 - Châteaulin, 46 km (29 mi) (ITT)

Stage 8 result

Rank	Rider	Team	Time
1	Charly Gaul (LUX)	Netherlands/Luxembourg	1h 07' 12"
2	Jacques Anquetil (FRA)	France	+ 7"
3	Jef Planckaert (BEL)	Belgium	+ 13"
4	Jean Brankart (BEL)	Belgium	+ 17"
5	Gilbert Desmet (BEL)	Belgium	+ 1' 09"
6	Raphaël Géminiani (FRA)	France – Centre-Midi	+ 2' 09"
7	Louison Bobet (FRA)	France	+ 2' 13"
8	Jan Adriaensens (BEL)	Belgium	+ 2' 16"
9	Gastone Nencini (ITA)	Italy	+ 2' 22"
10	François Mahé (FRA)	France	+ 2' 35"

General classification after stage 8

Rank	Rider	Team	Time
1	Gerrit Voorting (NED)	Netherlands/Luxembourg	35h 51' 39"
2	François Mahé (FRA)	France	+ 3"
3	Raphaël Géminiani (FRA)	France – Centre-Midi	+ 1' 09"
4	Gilbert Desmet (BEL)	Belgium	+ 2' 26"
5	Gilbert Bauvin (FRA)	France	+ 5' 45"
6	Salvador Botella (ESP)	Spain	+ 5' 55"
7	Jef Planckaert (BEL)	Belgium	+ 6' 22"
8	Joseph Morvan (FRA)	France – West/South-West	+ 7' 41"
9	Jacques Anquetil (FRA)	France	+ 9' 28"
10	Nicolas Barone (FRA)	France – Paris/North-East	+ 9' 51"

== Stage 9 ==
4 July 1958 - Quimper to Saint-Nazaire, 206 km (128 mi)

Stage 9 result

Rank	Rider	Team	Time
1	André Darrigade (FRA)	France	4h 48' 27"
2	Vito Favero (ITA)	Italy	s.t.
3	Rik Luyten (BEL)	Belgium	s.t.
4	Antonio Barbosa Alves (POR)	International	s.t.
5	Jean Graczyk (FRA)	France – Centre-Midi	s.t.
6	Jean Dotto (FRA)	France – Centre-Midi	+ 8"
7	Seamus Elliott (IRL)	International	+ 20"
8	Fernando Manzaneque (ESP)	Spain	+ 9' 18"
9	Martin Van Den Borgh (NED)	Netherlands/Luxembourg	+ 9' 34"
10	Pierino Baffi (ITA)	Italy	s.t.

General classification after stage 9

Rank	Rider	Team	Time
1	André Darrigade (FRA)	France	40h 49' 15"
2	Vito Favero (ITA)	Italy	+ 23"
3	Gerrit Voorting (NED)	Netherlands/Luxembourg	+ 38"
4	François Mahé (FRA)	France	+ 41"
5	Jean Graczyk (FRA)	France – Centre-Midi	+ 46"
6	Raphaël Géminiani (FRA)	France – Centre-Midi	+ 1' 47"
7	Gilbert Desmet (BEL)	Belgium	+ 3' 04"
8	Gilbert Bauvin (FRA)	France	+ 6' 23"
9	Salvador Botella (ESP)	Spain	+ 6' 33"
10	Jef Planckaert (BEL)	Belgium	+ 7' 00"

== Stage 10 ==
5 July 1958 - Saint-Nazaire to Royan, 255 km (158 mi)

Stage 10 result

Rank	Rider	Team	Time
1	Pierino Baffi (ITA)	Italy	6h 04' 57"
2	Joseph Thomin (FRA)	France – West/South-West	s.t.
3	Aldo Bolzan (ITA)	Netherlands/Luxembourg	s.t.
4	Seamus Elliott (IRL)	International	s.t.
5	Jos Hoevenaers (BEL)	Belgium	s.t.
6	Jean-Claude Annaert (FRA)	France – Paris/North-East	s.t.
7	Martin Van Den Borgh (NED)	Netherlands/Luxembourg	s.t.
8	Jaap Kersten (NED)	Netherlands/Luxembourg	s.t.
9	Francisco Moreno (ESP)	Spain	s.t.
10	Georges Gay (FRA)	France – Centre-Midi	s.t.

General classification after stage 10

Rank	Rider	Team	Time
1	André Darrigade (FRA)	France	46h 59' 42"
2	Vito Favero (ITA)	Italy	+ 23"
3	Gerrit Voorting (NED)	Netherlands/Luxembourg	+ 38"
4	François Mahé (FRA)	France	+ 41"
5	Jean Graczyk (FRA)	France – Centre-Midi	+ 46"
6	Raphaël Géminiani (FRA)	France – Centre-Midi	+ 1' 47"
7	Seamus Elliott (IRL)	International	+ 2' 43"
8	Gilbert Desmet (BEL)	Belgium	+ 3' 04"
9	Gilbert Bauvin (FRA)	France	+ 6' 23"
10	Salvador Botella (ESP)	Spain	+ 6' 33"

== Stage 11 ==
6 July 1958 - Royan to Bordeaux, 137 km (85 mi)

Stage 11 result

Rank	Rider	Team	Time
1	Arigo Padovan (ITA)	Italy	3h 12' 22"
2	André Vlayen (BEL)	Belgium	s.t.
3	Antonin Rolland (FRA)	France – Centre-Midi	s.t.
4	Joseph Groussard (FRA)	France	s.t.
5	Édouard Delberghe (FRA)	France – Paris/North-East	s.t.
6	Piet De Jongh (NED)	Netherlands/Luxembourg	s.t.
7	Piet van Est (NED)	Netherlands/Luxembourg	+ 2' 20"
8	Rik Luyten (BEL)	Belgium	s.t.
9	Francis Pipelin (FRA)	France	s.t.
10	Jean-Claude Grèt (SUI)	Switzerland/Germany	s.t.

General classification after stage 11

Rank	Rider	Team	Time
1	André Darrigade (FRA)	France	50h 16' 17"
2	Vito Favero (ITA)	Italy	+ 23"
3	Gerrit Voorting (NED)	Netherlands/Luxembourg	+ 38"
4	François Mahé (FRA)	France	+ 41"
5	Jean Graczyk (FRA)	France – Centre-Midi	+ 46"
6	Raphaël Géminiani (FRA)	France – Centre-Midi	+ 1' 47"
7	Seamus Elliott (IRL)	International	+ 2' 43"
8	Gilbert Desmet (BEL)	Belgium	+ 3' 04"
9	Gilbert Bauvin (FRA)	France	+ 6' 23"
10	Salvador Botella (ESP)	Spain	+ 6' 33"

== Stage 12 ==
7 July 1958 - Bordeaux to Dax, 161 km (100 mi)

Stage 12 result

Rank	Rider	Team	Time
1	Martin Van Geneugden (BEL)	Belgium	4h 11' 19"
2	Jean Gainche (FRA)	France – West/South-West	s.t.
3	Jos Hoevenaers (BEL)	Belgium	s.t.
4	Piet van Est (NED)	Netherlands/Luxembourg	s.t.
5	Jesús Galdeano (ESP)	Spain	s.t.
6	Henry Anglade (FRA)	France – Centre-Midi	s.t.
7	Édouard Delberghe (FRA)	France – Paris/North-East	+ 2' 20"
8	Arigo Padovan (ITA)	Italy	s.t.
9	André Darrigade (FRA)	France	+ 3' 26"
10	Jean Graczyk (FRA)	France – Centre-Midi	s.t.

General classification after stage 12

Rank	Rider	Team	Time
1	André Darrigade (FRA)	France	54h 31' 02"
2	Vito Favero (ITA)	Italy	+ 23"
3	Gerrit Voorting (NED)	Netherlands/Luxembourg	+ 38"
4	François Mahé (FRA)	France	+ 41"
5	Jean Graczyk (FRA)	France – Centre-Midi	+ 46"
6	Raphaël Géminiani (FRA)	France – Centre-Midi	+ 1' 47"
7	Seamus Elliott (IRL)	International	+ 2' 43"
8	Gilbert Desmet (BEL)	Belgium	+ 3' 04"
9	Gilbert Bauvin (FRA)	France	+ 6' 23"
10	Salvador Botella (ESP)	Spain	+ 6' 33"
