= 1958 Tour de France =

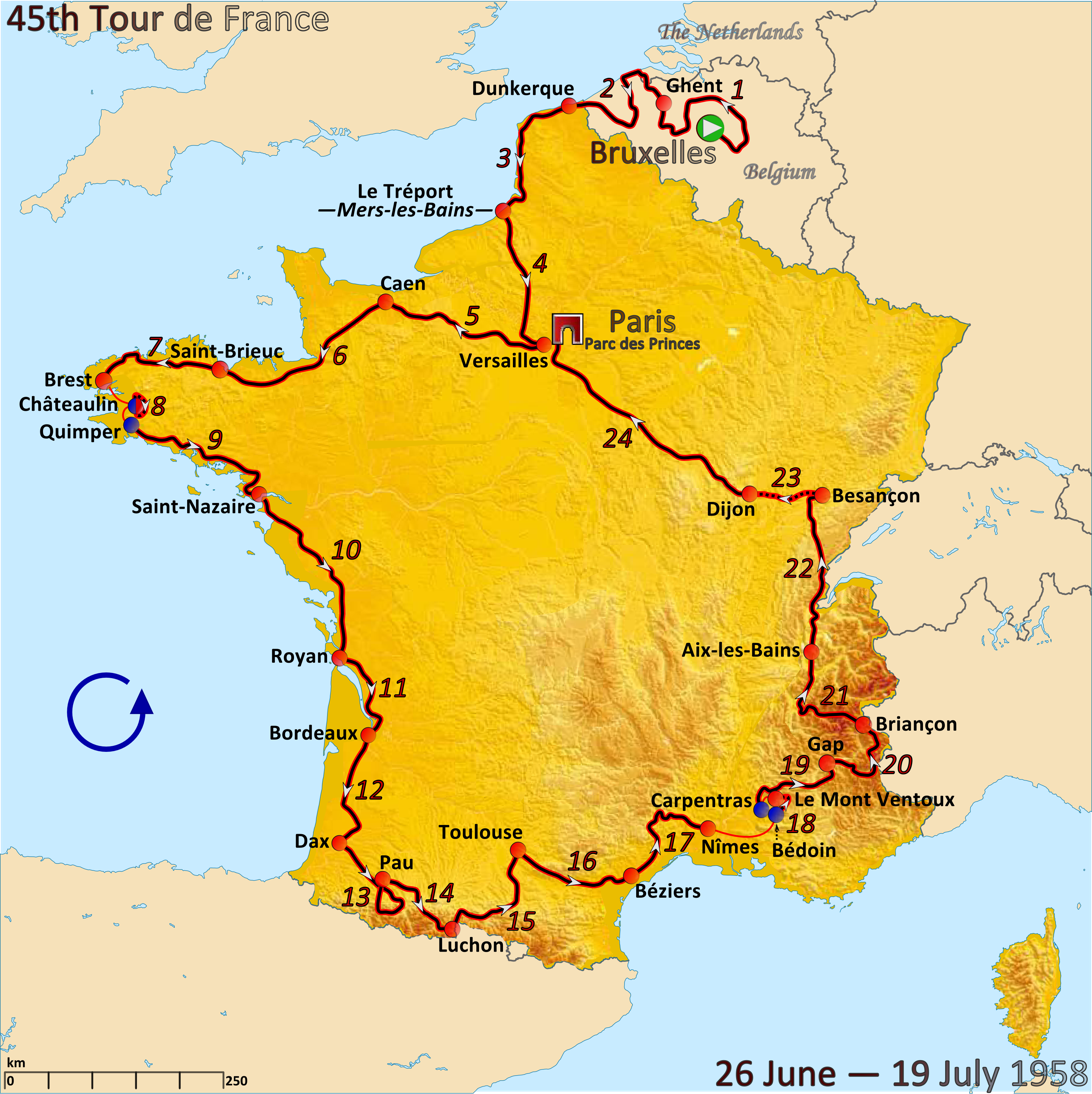
- Route of the 1958 Tour de France followed anticlockwise, starting in Brussels and finishing in Paris

Race details
- Dates: 26 June – 19 July 1958
- Stages: 24
- Distance: 4,319 km (2,684 mi)
- Winning time: 116h 59' 05"

Results
Jersey awarded to the overall winner	Winner	Charly Gaul (LUX)	(Netherlands/Luxembourg)
	Second	Vito Favero (ITA)	(Italy)
	Third	Raphaël Géminiani (FRA)	(Centre-Midi)
Jersey awarded to the points classification winner	Points	Jean Graczyk (FRA)	(Centre-Midi)
	Mountains	Federico Bahamontes (ESP)	(Spain)
	Combativity	Federico Bahamontes (ESP)	(Spain)
	Team	Belgium	

The 1958 Tour de France was the 45th edition of the Tour de France, taking place from 26 June to 19 July. The total race distance was 24 stages over 4,319 km (2,684 mi).

The yellow jersey for the leader in the general classification changed owner a record 11 times, and only at the penultimate stage in the time trial the decision was made, when Gaul created a margin of more than three minutes. In the final sprint, sprinter André Darrigade, who had already won five stages, collided with a stage official, who eleven days later died because of his injuries.

== Teams ==
In 1958, 120 cyclists entered, divided into 10 teams of 12 cyclists each. France, Italy, Belgium and Spain each sent a national team. The Netherlands and Luxembourg had a combined team, as had Switzerland and West Germany. There was also one "Internationals" team, consisting of cyclists from Austria, Portugal, Great Britain and Denmark. There were also three regional French teams: Centre-Midi, West/South-West and Paris/North-East.

The teams entering the race were:

- France
- Italy
- Belgium
- Spain
- Netherlands/Luxembourg
- Switzerland/West Germany
- Internationals
- Centre-Midi
- West/South-West
- Paris/North-East

== Pre-race favourites ==
The French team had had some problems with the selection, as Jacques Anquetil, the winner of the 1957 Tour de France, did not want to share leadership with Louison Bobet, winner in 1953, 1954 and 1955. Anquetil had been so superior in 1957, that he did not want Bobet and Géminiani both in his team. The French team selector then chose to include Bobet in the national team. Raphael Géminiani, who had been in the French national team since 1949, was demoted into the regional Centre-Midi team. Géminiani was not pleased, and sent the French team director Marcel Bidot a "jack-ass" named "Marcel" to express his displeasure.

Charly Gaul was part of a Dutch / Luxembourg team and agreed to share his prizes with the team in exchange for their support.

== Route and stages ==
The 1958 Tour de France started on 26 June. Whereas there had been two rest days in recent years, the 1958 Tour had no rest days at all. For the first time, the first mountain climbs were broadcast live on television. The highest point of elevation in the race was 2,360 m (7,740 ft) at the summit of the Col d'Izoard mountain pass on stage 20.

Stage characteristics and winners
Stage	Date	Course	Distance	Type	Winner
1	26 June	Brussels (Belgium) to Ghent (Belgium)	184 km (114 mi)	Plain stage	André Darrigade (FRA)
2	27 June	Ghent (Belgium) to Dunkirk	198 km (123 mi)	Plain stage	Gerrit Voorting (NED)
3	28 June	Dunkirk to Mers-les-Bains	177 km (110 mi)	Plain stage	Gilbert Bauvin (FRA)
4	29 June	Le Tréport to Versailles	205 km (127 mi)	Plain stage	Jean Gainche (FRA)
5	30 June	Versailles to Caen	232 km (144 mi)	Plain stage	Tino Sabbadini (FRA)
6	1 July	Caen to Saint-Brieuc	223 km (139 mi)	Plain stage	Martin van Geneugden (BEL)
7	2 July	Saint-Brieuc to Brest	170 km (110 mi)	Plain stage	Brian Robinson (GBR)
8	3 July	Châteaulin	46 km (29 mi)	Individual time trial	Charly Gaul (LUX)
9	4 July	Quimper to Saint-Nazaire	206 km (128 mi)	Plain stage	André Darrigade (FRA)
10	5 July	Saint-Nazaire to Royan	255 km (158 mi)	Plain stage	Pierino Baffi (ITA)
11	6 July	Royan to Bordeaux	137 km (85 mi)	Plain stage	Arigo Padovan (ITA)
12	7 July	Bordeaux to Dax	161 km (100 mi)	Plain stage	Martin van Geneugden (BEL)
13	8 July	Dax to Pau	230 km (140 mi)	Stage with mountain(s)	Louis Bergaud (FRA)
14	9 July	Pau to Luchon	129 km (80 mi)	Stage with mountain(s)	Federico Bahamontes (ESP)
15	10 July	Luchon to Toulouse	176 km (109 mi)	Stage with mountain(s)	André Darrigade (FRA)
16	11 July	Toulouse to Béziers	187 km (116 mi)	Plain stage	Pierino Baffi (ITA)
17	12 July	Béziers to Nîmes	189 km (117 mi)	Plain stage	André Darrigade (FRA)
18	13 July	Bédoin to Mont-Ventoux	21 km (13 mi)	Mountain time trial	Charly Gaul (LUX)
19	14 July	Carpentras to Gap	178 km (111 mi)	Stage with mountain(s)	Gastone Nencini (ITA)
20	15 July	Gap to Briançon	165 km (103 mi)	Stage with mountain(s)	Federico Bahamontes (ESP)
21	16 July	Briançon to Aix-les-Bains	219 km (136 mi)	Stage with mountain(s)	Charly Gaul (LUX)
22	17 July	Aix-les-Bains to Besançon	237 km (147 mi)	Stage with mountain(s)	André Darrigade (FRA)
23	18 July	Besançon to Dijon	74 km (46 mi)	Individual time trial	Charly Gaul (LUX)
24	19 July	Dijon to Paris	320 km (200 mi)	Plain stage	Pierino Baffi (ITA)
	Total		4,319 km (2,684 mi)		

== Race overview ==
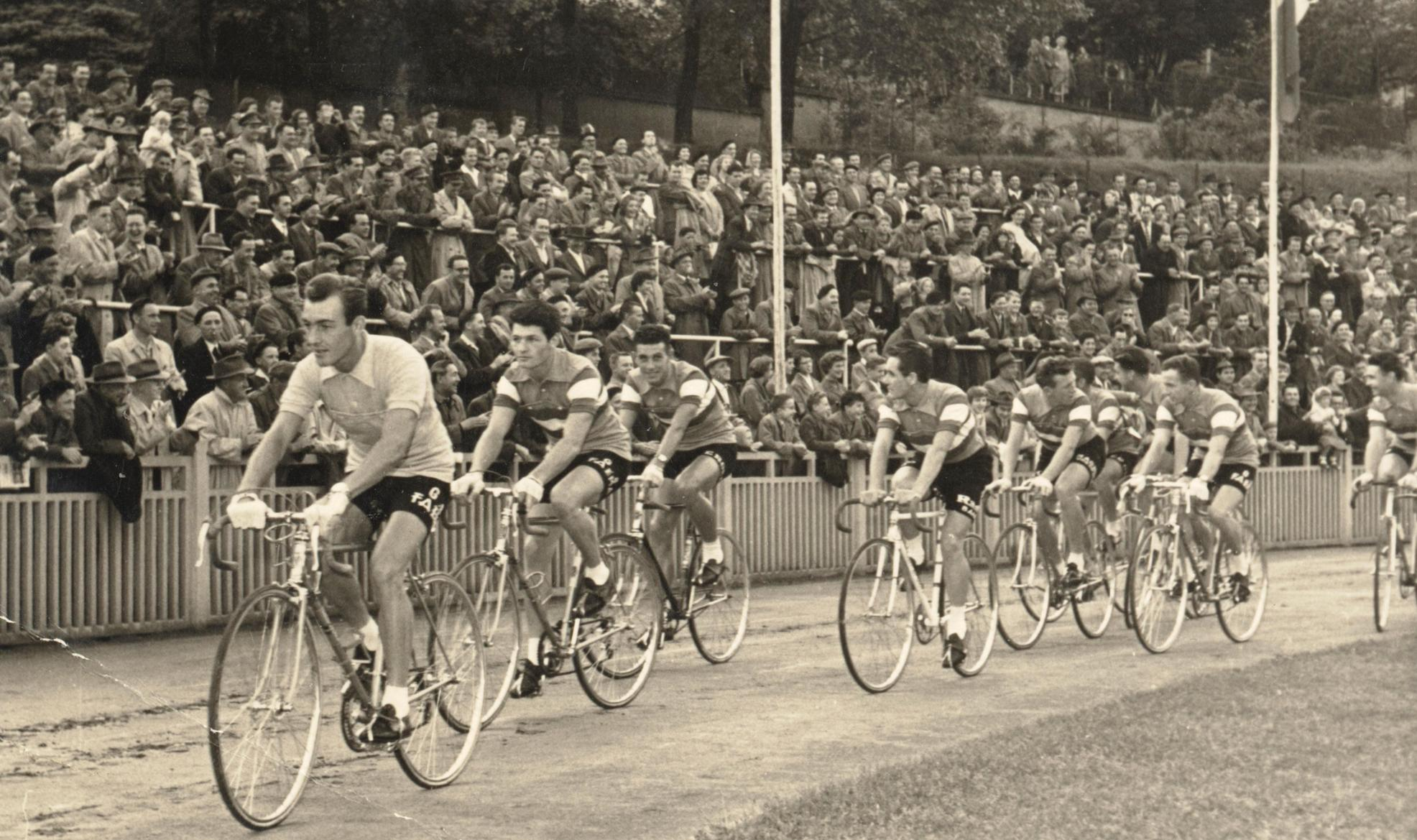
Charly Gaul (left) wearing the race leader's yellow jersey, leading the combined Netherlands and Luxembourg team at the end of the Tour

The first stage left in Brussels, to celebrate Brussel's World Fair. In the first stages, Luxembourgian climber Charly Gaul struggled, and lost considerable time in flat stages. During a break in the sixth stage, Anquetil and Bobet were left behind. Géminiani was in the leading group, and gained more than ten minutes on his rivals. After the sixth stage, Gerrit Voorting was in first place, followed by François Mahé from the French national team, and Géminiani. In the seventh stage, Arigo Padovan won the sprint from Brian Robinson. The jury however relegated Padovan to second place for irregular sprinting, and Robinson became the first British winner of a stage.

The ninth stage again saw a large breakaway, this time including Darrigade. Darrigade won the sprint, and because the next group was more than 10 minutes behind, he became the new leader. Géminiani and the French national team were still on bad terms. When Gastone Nencini, a threat to both, had escaped and the national team members asked Géminiani to help them to get Nencini back, Géminiani refused.

The Pyrénées were visited in stage 13. Darrigade was not able to keep up with the leaders, and lost the lead. Bahamontes had tried to escape but failed, and later Gaul tried to escape, but he also failed. The favourites finished together, and Géminiani became the new leader; Vito Favero was only three seconds behind him. In the fourteenth stage, also in the Pyrenees, Bahamontes escaped again, and this time he managed to stay away and win. Géminiani finished in the next group, but because Favero won the sprint for the second place, he received 30 seconds bonification time, and became the new leader. In the fifteenth stage, Favero again finished second, and extended his lead again by 30 seconds.

In the eighteenth stage, a mountain time trial, Gaul won back time, and jumped from sixth place to third place in the general classification. Géminiani jumped back to the first place in that stage. In the nineteenth stage, over the Alps, Gaul had mechanical problems, and lost ten minutes. Second-placed rider Favero was now at a margin of more than three minutes. In the twentieth stage, again in the Alps, Bahamontes finished first. Gaul lost a few seconds to Géminiani in that stage, so after the twentieth stage, Gaul was more than sixteen minutes behind Géminiani. With only a few stages left, Géminiani appeared to be able to win the race.

In stage 21, the weather conditions were bad. Before the stage started, Gaul told Bobet that he would attack on the first climb of the day, which he did. Bahamontes followed him, but let himself drop back because the weather was too bad and the finish was still far away. Gaul continued on his own, and his margin with the next cyclist kept growing. Géminiani now asked the French national team to help him, but they could not help and did not want to help. Géminiani forgot to take food in the food zone, and was hungry in the last part of the stage. In the end, Gaul won the stage almost 8 minutes ahead of the next rider. Favero came in third, more than ten minutes later, and Géminiani seventh more than 14 minutes behind. Favero was again first in the general classification, with Géminiani only 39 seconds behind in second place and Gaul 67 seconds behind in third place. After that stage, Géminiani accused the French team of treason, because he said it was due to their attacks that he lost the lead. Because of the extraordinary circumstances, the time limits were not enforced that stage. Second-placed rider Favero was now at a margin of more than three minutes.

Stage 22 was flat, and the favourites stayed together. This meant that the time trial in stage 23 would be decisive. In that time trial, Gaul was the first of these three to start. Gaul set the winning time, and Géminiani and Favero lost more than three minutes, so Gaul took the lead in the general classification. Anquetil, who felt sick and was behind in the general classification, did not start that stage.

The last stage traditionally saw no problems for the leader, and Gaul became the first Luxembourgian cyclist since 1928 to win the Tour. In the final sprint in the last stage in the Parc des Princes, André Darrigade was in first position when he collided with Constant Wouters, the 70-year-old secrétaire-général of the stadium, who was attempting to prevent photographers encroaching on the track. Darrigade needed five stitches, but Wouters' injuries were more serious, and he died eleven days later.

== Classification leadership and minor prizes ==
The time that each cyclist required to finish each stage was recorded, and these times were added together for the general classification. If a cyclist had received a time bonus, it was subtracted from this total; all time penalties were added to this total. The cyclist with the least accumulated time was the race leader, identified by the yellow jersey.The yellow jersey changed hands eleven times, the most ever. Gaul had an average speed of 36.919 km/h, which was a new record. Of the 120 cyclists that started the 1958 Tour de France, 78 finished the race.

The points classification was calculated by adding the stage ranks of each cyclist.

The mountains classification was calculated by adding the points given to cyclists for reaching the highest point in a climb first.

The team classification was calculated as the sum of the daily team classifications, and the daily team classification was calculated by adding the times in the stage result of the best three cyclists per team. It was won by the Belgian team, with a large margin over the Italian team.

In addition, there was a combativity award given after each mass-start stage to the cyclist considered most combative. The decision was made by a jury composed of journalists who gave points. The cyclist with the most points from votes in all stages led the combativity classification. Federico Bahamontes won this classification, and was given overall the super-combativity award. The Souvenir Henri Desgrange was given in honour of Tour founder Henri Desgrange to the first rider to pass the summit of the Col du Lautaret on stage 21. This prize was won by Piet van Est.

Classification leadership by stage
Stage	Winner	General classification	Points classification	Mountains classification (Note: No jersey was awarded to the leader of the mountains classification until a white jersey with red polka dots was introduced in 1975.)	Team classification	Combativity		Bad luck award
Stage	Winner	General classification	Points classification	Mountains classification	Team classification	Award	Classification	Bad luck award
1	André Darrigade	André Darrigade	André Darrigade	no award	Belgium	Jef Planckaert	Jef Planckaert	Piero Polo
2	Gerrit Voorting	Jos Hoevenaers	Jos Hoevenaers	no award	Belgium	Jean Graczyk	Jef Planckaert	André Darrigade
3	Gilbert Bauvin	Wim van Est	Jean Graczyk	no award	Netherlands/Luxembourg	Jean Stablinski	Jef Planckaert	Jef Planckaert
4	Jean Gainche	Wim van Est	Jean Graczyk	no award	Belgium	François Mahé	Jef Planckaert	Gianni Ferlenghi
5	Tino Sabbadini	Gilbert Bauvin	Jean Graczyk	no award	France	Louison Bobet	Jef Planckaert	Nicolas Barone
6	Martin van Geneugden	Gerrit Voorting	Jean Graczyk	no award	France	François Mahé	François Mahé	Marcel Janssens
7	Brian Robinson	Gerrit Voorting	Jean Graczyk	no award	France	Brian Robinson	François Mahé	Giuseppe Fallarini
8	Charly Gaul	Gerrit Voorting	Jean Graczyk	no award	France	Charly Gaul	François Mahé	Maurice Lavigne
9	André Darrigade	André Darrigade	Jean Graczyk	no award	France	Jean Graczyk	Jean Graczyk	Seamus Elliott
10	Pierino Baffi	André Darrigade	Jean Graczyk	no award	France	Armand Desmet	Jean Graczyk	Noël Foré
11	Arigo Padovan	André Darrigade	Jean Graczyk	no award	France	Piet van Est	Jean Graczyk	no award
12	Martin van Geneugden	André Darrigade	Jean Graczyk	no award	France	no award	Jean Graczyk	Pino Cerami
13	Louis Bergaud	Raphaël Géminiani	Jean Graczyk	Federico Bahamontes	France	Louis Bergaud	Jean Graczyk	Carmelo Morales
14	Federico Bahamontes	Vito Favero	Jean Graczyk	Federico Bahamontes	France	Federico Bahamontes	Jean Graczyk	Toni Gräser
15	André Darrigade	Vito Favero	Jean Graczyk	Federico Bahamontes	France	no award	Jean Graczyk	Martin van der Borgh
16	Pierino Baffi	Vito Favero	Jean Graczyk	Federico Bahamontes	France	Jean Dacquay	Jean Graczyk	Gilbert Bauvin
17	André Darrigade	Vito Favero	Jean Graczyk	Federico Bahamontes	France	Federico Bahamontes	Federico Bahamontes	Rik Luyten
18	Charly Gaul	Raphaël Géminiani	Jean Graczyk	Federico Bahamontes	Belgium	Charly Gaul	Federico Bahamontes	Marcel Rohrbach
19	Gastone Nencini	Raphaël Géminiani	Jean Graczyk	Federico Bahamontes	Belgium	Raphaël Géminiani	Federico Bahamontes	Georges Gay
20	Federico Bahamontes	Raphaël Géminiani	Jean Graczyk	Federico Bahamontes	Belgium	Antonino Catalano	Federico Bahamontes	Louison Bobet
21	Charly Gaul	Vito Favero	Jean Graczyk	Federico Bahamontes	France	Charly Gaul	Federico Bahamontes	Salvador Botella
22	André Darrigade	Vito Favero	Jean Graczyk	Federico Bahamontes	France	André Darrigade	Federico Bahamontes	Alves Barbosa
23	Charly Gaul	Charly Gaul	Jean Graczyk	Federico Bahamontes	Belgium	Charly Gaul	Federico Bahamontes	Jean Dotto
24	Pierino Baffi	Charly Gaul	Jean Graczyk	Federico Bahamontes	Belgium	no award	Federico Bahamontes	André Darrigade
Final		Charly Gaul	Jean Graczyk	Federico Bahamontes	Belgium	Federico Bahamontes		André Darrigade

== Final standings ==
=== General classification ===
Final general classification (1–10)
Rank	Rider	Team	Time
1	Charly Gaul (LUX)	Netherlands/Luxembourg	116h 59' 05"
2	Vito Favero (ITA)	Italy	+ 3' 10"
3	Raphaël Géminiani (FRA)	Centre-Midi	+ 3' 41"
4	Jan Adriaensens (BEL)	Belgium	+ 7' 16"
5	Gastone Nencini (ITA)	Italy	+ 13' 33"
6	Jozef Planckaert (BEL)	Belgium	+ 28' 01"
7	Louison Bobet (FRA)	France	+ 31' 39"
8	Federico Bahamontes (ESP)	Spain	+ 40' 44"
9	Louis Bergaud (FRA)	France	+ 48' 33"
10	Jos Hoevenaers (BEL)	Belgium	+ 58' 26"

Final general classification (11–78)
Rank	Rider	Team	Time
11	Piet Damen (NED)	Netherlands/Luxembourg	+ 1h 00' 40"
12	Lothar Friedrich (FRG)	Switzerland/West Germany	+ 1h 02' 13"
13	Edouard Delberghe (FRA)	Paris/North-East	+ 1h 02' 18"
14	Jean Graczyk (FRA)	Centre-Midi	+ 1h 04' 39"
15	Gilbert Bauvin (FRA)	France	+ 1h 12' 51"
16	Marcel Ernzer (LUX)	Netherlands/Luxembourg	+ 1h 16' 29"
17	Henry Anglade (FRA)	Centre-Midi	+ 1h 24' 57"
18	Joseph Thomin (FRA)	West/South-West	+ 1h 25' 44"
19	Nino Catalano (ITA)	Italy	+ 1h 26' 05"
20	Fernando Manzaneque (ESP)	Spain	+ 1h 29' 30"
21	André Darrigade (FRA)	France	+ 1h 34' 22"
22	Piet Van Est (NED)	Netherlands/Luxembourg	+ 1h 35' 37"
23	Jean-Claude Annaert (FRA)	Paris/North-East	+ 1h 37' 05"
24	Gianni Ferlenghi (ITA)	Italy	+ 1h 37' 58"
25	Joseph Groussard (FRA)	France	+ 1h 40' 46"
26	Marcel Rohrbach (FRA)	Centre-Midi	+ 1h 41' 17"
27	Martin Van Geneugden (BEL)	Belgium	+ 1h 43' 02"
28	Adolf Christian (AUT)	Internationals	+ 1h 46' 19"
29	Jean Gainche (FRA)	West/South-West	+ 1h 47' 16"
30	Anton Graeser (SUI)	Switzerland/West Germany	+ 1h 52' 40"
31	Manuel Busto (FRA)	Centre-Midi	+ 1h 53' 56"
32	Aldo Bolzan (ITA)	Netherlands/Luxembourg	+ 1h 58' 52"
33	Armand Desmet (BEL)	Belgium	+ 2h 02' 44"
34	Pietro Nascimbene (ITA)	Italy	+ 2h 03' 05"
35	Joseph Morvan (FRA)	West/South-West	+ 2h 05' 37"
36	Franz Reitz (FRG)	Switzerland/West Germany	+ 2h 08' 59"
37	Jempy Schmitz (LUX)	Netherlands/Luxembourg	+ 2h 09' 02"
38	Emilio Bottecchia (ITA)	Italy	+ 2h 09' 26"
39	Pierre Polo (FRA)	Centre-Midi	+ 2h 14' 08"
40	Fernand Lamy (FRA)	Paris/North-East	+ 2h 14' 20"
41	Piet De Jongh (NED)	Netherlands/Luxembourg	+ 2h 18' 31"
42	Ernst Traxel (SUI)	Switzerland/West Germany	+ 2h 18' 57"
43	Rizzardo Brenioli (ITA)	Italy	+ 2h 20' 05"
44	Jaap Kersten (NED)	Netherlands/Luxembourg	+ 2h 21' 06"
45	Arigo Padovan (ITA)	Italy	+ 2h 21' 20"
46	Wim van Est (NED)	Netherlands/Luxembourg	+ 2h 22' 16"
47	Gerrit Voorting (NED)	Netherlands/Luxembourg	+ 2h 22' 28"
48	Seamus Elliott (IRL)	Internationals	+ 2h 23' 16"
49	Fernand Picot (FRA)	West/South-West	+ 2h 27' 21"
50	Gilberto Dall' Agata (ITA)	Italy	+ 2h 29' 58"
51	Serge David (FRA)	Paris/North-East	+ 2h 31' 55"
52	Hendrik Luyten (BEL)	Belgium	+ 2h 35' 18"
53	Tino Sabbadini (FRA)	West/South-West	+ 2h 39' 33"
54	Camille Le Menn (FRA)	West/South-West	+ 2h 41' 17"
55	Bernardo Ruiz (ESP)	Spain	+ 2h 42' 17"
56	Luis Otaño (ESP)	Spain	+ 2h 42' 59"
57	Raymond Hoorelbeke (FRA)	Paris/North-East	+ 2h 43' 14"
58	Horst Tuller (FRG)	Switzerland/West Germany	+ 2h 43' 23"
59	Jesús Galdeano (ESP)	Spain	+ 2h 43' 42"
60	René Privat (FRA)	France	+ 2h 44' 04"
61	Francis Pipelin (FRA)	France	+ 2h 46' 57"
62	Hans Andresen (DEN)	Internationals	+ 2h 47' 36"
63	Pierino Baffi (ITA)	Italy	+ 2h 49' 36"
64	Antonio Suárez (ESP)	Spain	+ 2h 52' 42"
65	Giuseppe Pintarelli (ITA)	Italy	+ 2h 54' 35"
66	Antonin Rolland (FRA)	Centre-Midi	+ 2h 56' 47"
67	Jean-Claude Grèt (SUI)	Switzerland/West Germany	+ 3h 02' 13"
68	Jean Stablinski (FRA)	France	+ 3h 02' 32"
68	Stan Brittain (GBR)	Internationals	+ 3h 02' 32"
70	Roger Chaussabel (FRA)	Centre-Midi	+ 3h 03' 05"
71	Francisco Moreno (ESP)	Spain	+ 3h 13' 22"
72	Miguel Bover (ESP)	Spain	+ 3h 20' 30"
73	Stanislas Bober (FRA)	Paris/North-East	+ 3h 21' 38"
74	Ernest Ecuyer (SUI)	Switzerland/West Germany	+ 3h 26' 14"
75	Roger Walkowiak (FRA)	France	+ 3h 43' 45"
76	Alves Barbosa (POR)	Internationals	+ 3h 44' 23"
77	Mario Bertolo (ITA)	Centre-Midi	+ 3h 48' 14"
78	Walter Favre (SUI)	Switzerland/West Germany	+ 3h 49' 28"

=== Points classification ===
Final points classification (1–10)
Rank	Rider	Team	Points
1	Jean Graczyk (FRA)	Centre-Midi	347
2	Jef Planckaert (BEL)	Belgium	406
3	André Darrigade (FRA)	France	553
4	Jean Gainche (FRA)	West/South-West	584
5	Edouard Delberghe (FRA)	Paris/North-East	623
6	Gilbert Bauvin (FRA)	France	660
7	Jos Hoevenaers (BEL)	Belgium	663
8	Gastone Nencini (ITA)	Italy	682
9	Piet van Est (NED)	Netherlands/Luxembourg	718
10	Wim van Est (NED)	Netherlands/Luxembourg	728

=== Mountains classification ===
Final mountains classification (1–10)
Rank	Rider	Team	Points
1	Federico Bahamontes (ESP)	Spain	81
2	Charly Gaul (LUX)	Netherlands/Luxembourg	64
3	Jean Dotto (FRA)	Centre-Midi	34
4	Gianni Ferlenghi (ITA)	Italy	33
5	Jean Adriaenssens (BEL)	Belgium	28
6	Nino Catalano (ITA)	Italy	19
6	Piet van Est (NED)	Netherlands/Luxembourg	19
8	Jacques Anquetil (FRA)	France	18
8	Raphaël Géminiani (FRA)	Centre-Midi	18
8	Gastone Nencini (ITA)	Italy	18
8	Piet Damen (NED)	Netherlands/Luxembourg	18

=== Team classification ===
Final team classification
Rank	Team	Time
1	Belgium	352h 30' 58"
2	Italy	+ 9' 05"
3	Netherlands/Luxembourg	+ 43' 26"
4	France	+ 59' 20"
5	Centre-Midi	+ 59' 34"
6	Spain	+ 3h 18' 48"
7	Paris/North-East	+ 3h 20' 00"
8	Switzerland/West Germany	+ 3h 30' 09"
9	West/South-West	+ 3h 45' 14"
10	Internationals	+ 5h 23' 28"

=== Combativity classification ===
Final combativity classification (1–10)
Rank	Rider	Team	Points
1	Federico Bahamontes (ESP)	Spain	246
2	André Darrigade (FRA)	France	242
3	Charly Gaul (LUX)	Netherlands/Luxembourg	224
4	Jean Graczyk (FRA)	Centre-Midi	213
5	Raphaël Géminiani (FRA)	Centre-Midi	136
6	Louison Bobet (FRA)	France	93
7	Gastone Nencini (ITA)	Italy	90
8	Nino Catalano (ITA)	Italy	79
8	Jef Planckaert (BEL)	Belgium	79
10	Jean-Claude Annaert (FRA)	Paris/North-East	73

== Bibliography ==
- Augendre, Jacques (2016). Guide historique [Historical guide] (PDF) (in French). Paris: Amaury Sport Organisation. Archived (PDF) from the original on 17 August 2016.
- McGann, Bill; McGann, Carol (2006). The Story of the Tour de France: 1903–1964. Vol. 1. Indianapolis: Dog Ear Publishing. ISBN 978-1-59858-180-5.
- Nauright, John; Parrish, Charles (2012). Sports Around the World: History, Culture, and Practice. Vol. 2. Santa Barbara, California: ABC-CLIO. ISBN 978-1-59884-300-2.
- van den Akker, Pieter (2018). Tour de France Rules and Statistics: 1903–2018. Self-published. ISBN 978-1-79398-080-9.
- Thompson, Christopher S. (2008). The Tour de France: A Cultural History. Oakland, California: University of California Press. ISBN 978-0-520-25630-9.
