= 1959 Giro d'Italia =

Race details
- Dates: 16 May - 7 June 1959
- Stages: 22
- Distance: 3,657 km (2,272 mi)
- Winning time: 101h 50' 26"

Results
Jersey awarded to the overall winner	Winner	Charly Gaul (LUX)	(EMI)
	Second	Jacques Anquetil (FRA)	(Helyett-Potin)
	Third	Diego Ronchini (ITA)	(Bianchi–Pirelli)
	Mountains	Charly Gaul (LUX)	(EMI)
	Sprints	Angelo Conterno (ITA)	(Carpano)
	Team	Atala–Pirelli–Lygi	

The 1959 Giro d'Italia was the 42nd running of the Giro d'Italia, one of cycling's Grand Tour races. The Giro started in Milan, on 16 May, with a 135 km (83.9 mi) stage and concluded back in Milan, on 7 June, with a 220 km (136.7 mi) leg. A total of 130 riders from 13 teams entered the 22-stage race, which was won by Luxembourgian Charly Gaul of the EMI team. The second and third places were taken by Frenchman Jacques Anquetil and Italian Diego Ronchini, respectively.

== Teams ==
In the weeks preceding the Giro's start, Jacques Anquetil and the Helyett-Potin team were interested in participating in the race; however, they desired an appearance fee. After calls were made, the team eventually settled on coming to the race. Ultimately, thirteen teams were invited by the race organizers to participate in the 1959 edition of the Giro d'Italia. The team size increased from eight to ten riders per team, which meant that the race started with a peloton of 130 cyclists. The teams were primarily composed of Italian riders except Faema–Guerra and Helyett-Potin. From the riders that began the race, 86 made it to the finish in Milan.

The teams entering the race were:

- Atala–Pirelli–Lygi
- Bianchi–Pirelli
- Carpano
- EMI
- Faema–Guerra
- Ghigi–Ganna
- Ignis–Frejus
- Legnano–Pirelli
- Molteni
- Helyett-Potin
- San Pellegrino
- Torpado
- Tricofilina

== Pre-race favorites ==
Jacques Anquetil and Charly Gaul were seen as favorites to win the race. Anquetil entered the Giro with a formidable Helyett-Potin team that included the likes of 1958 Vuelta a España winner Jean Stablinski, the 1958 Tour de France's most "elegant" rider Edouard Delberghe, Irishman Seamus Elliot, and Jean Graczyk. When asked about his chances to win the race Anquetil stated: "I know that I am in good shape. If I am beaten, it will mean there are better riders than myself in the race." Reigning world champion Ercole Baldini was seen as a contender to win the race, but due to an operation at the beginning of the cycling season he entered the race weighing more than normal. Charly Gaul entered as a previous winner of the Giro d'Italia in 1956 Giro d'Italia, as well as the reigning champion of the Tour de France.

Faema–Guerra's Rik Van Looy had desires to win a Grand Tour during his career and had previously raced the Giro in 1955 and Vuelta a España in 1958, not finishing either race. However, during the 1959 campaign, Looy won the Giro di Sardegna and Vuelta a Levante, as well as finishing third in the Vuelta a España. Faema–Guerra entered with a completely Belgian team except for German Hans Junkermann and had gotten the nickname "Red Guard" because of their red jerseys, the team was well known for setting up Looy for stage victories. Miguel Poblet stated he was not there just to win stages.

== Route and stages ==
The route for the race was released on 2 April 1959 at the Casino della Valle in Saint Vincent in front of journalists, local dignitaries, and various industrialists. There were four individual time trials within the race of which one, stage 7, was a climbing time trial up to Mount Vesuvius. Ten stages contained a total 15 categorized climbs. The only rest day was scheduled on 27 May in Rimini. The race consisted of 22 days of racing and was covered 3,657 km (2,272 mi).

Regarding the route for the Giro d'Italia, Corriere dello Sport writer Cesare Facetti felt that the route was very difficult and would make it very difficult for a rider to complete the Giro d'Italia and be successful in the Tour de France in late June.

Stage characteristics and winners
Stage	Date	Course	Distance	Type	Winner
1	16 May	Milan to Salsomaggiore Terme	135 km (84 mi)	Plain stage	Rik Van Looy (BEL)
2	17 May	Salsomaggiore Terme to Salsomaggiore Terme	22 km (14 mi)	Individual time trial	Jacques Anquetil (FRA)
3	18 May	Salsomaggiore Terme to Abetone	180 km (112 mi)	Stage with mountain(s)	Charly Gaul (LUX)
4	19 May	Abetone to Arezzo	178 km (111 mi)	Stage with mountain(s)	Armando Pellegrini (ITA)
5	20 May	Arezzo to Rome	243 km (151 mi)	Stage with mountain(s)	Rik Van Looy (BEL)
6	21 May	Rome to Naples	213 km (132 mi)	Plain stage	Miguel Poblet (ESP)
7	22 May	Ercolano to Mount Vesuvius	8 km (5 mi)	Individual time trial	Charly Gaul (LUX)
8	23 May	Ischia to Ischia	31 km (19 mi)	Individual time trial	Antonino Catalano (ITA)
9	24 May	Naples to Vasto	206 km (128 mi)	Plain stage	Gastone Nencini (ITA)
10	25 May	Vasto to Teramo	148 km (92 mi)	Plain stage	Rino Benedettii (ITA)
11	26 May	Ascoli Piceno to Rimini	245 km (152 mi)	Plain stage	Rik Van Looy (BEL)
12	27 May	Rimini to City of San Marino (San Marino)	141 km (88 mi)	Stage with mountain(s)	Nino Defilippis (ITA)
	28 May	Rest day			
13	29 May	Rimini to Verona	233 km (145 mi)	Plain stage	Miguel Poblet (ESP)
14	30 May	Verona to Rovereto	143 km (89 mi)	Stage with mountain(s)	Rik Van Looy (BEL)
15	31 May	Trento to Bolzano	198 km (123 mi)	Stage with mountain(s)	Miguel Poblet (ESP)
16	1 June	Bolzano to San Pellegrino Terme	245 km (152 mi)	Stage with mountain(s)	Alessandro Fantini (ITA)
17	2 June	San Pellegrino Terme to Genoa	241 km (150 mi)	Plain stage	Arigo Padovan (ITA)
18	3 June	Genoa to Turin	180 km (112 mi)	Stage with mountain(s)	Vito Favero (ITA)
19	4 June	Turin to Susa	51 km (32 mi)	Individual time trial	Jacques Anquetil (FRA)
20	5 June	Turin to Saint-Vincent	100 km (62 mi)	Plain stage	Alfredo Sabbadin (ITA)
21	6 June	Aosta to Courmayeur	296 km (184 mi)	Stage with mountain(s)	Charly Gaul (LUX)
22	7 June	Courmayeur to Milan	220 km (137 mi)	Plain stage	Rolf Graf (SUI)
	Total		3,657 km (2,272 mi)		

== Race overview ==
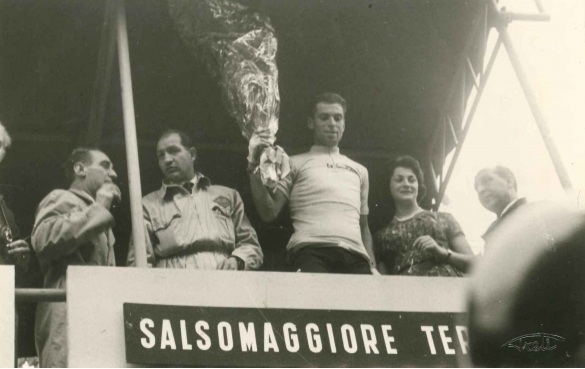
Gino Bartali next to Rik Van Looy, stage winner and first pink jersey of the 42nd Giro

The race began with the introductions in the Duomo square in front of the Milan cathedral, with Baldini received the loudest ovation upon his introduction. The opening leg finished at the famed Spa town Salsomaggiore. During the stage, only one breakaway was able to sustain a lengthy advantage over the peloton and that came 76 km (47 mi) into the race with a solo attack by Darrigade (Helyett). He managed to win the intermediate sprint on the course before being joined by six riders and another twenty as the stage wound down; however, the escapees were caught with 8 km (5 mi) to go. The day ended with a bunch sprint won by Belgian Rik Van Looy. The following stage was the first individual time trial of the race, which Anquetil was favored to win. Anquetil won the day by twenty-five seconds ahead of Rolf Graf and assumed the race lead. He rode the stage on a 52 x 13 gear, which when Gaul found out following the stage said "Nobody, not even Anquetil, can push that gear." The first summit finish came with the third leg that ended on the Abetone. A twelve-man group containing Looy and Jos Hoevenaers reached the climb first, while a second major group containing the favorites likes Anquetil and Gaul reached the climb after. Gaul attacked at the beginning of the climb and reached the first group alone. He rode with them for a short time before attacking and going on solo to win the stage and take the race lead.

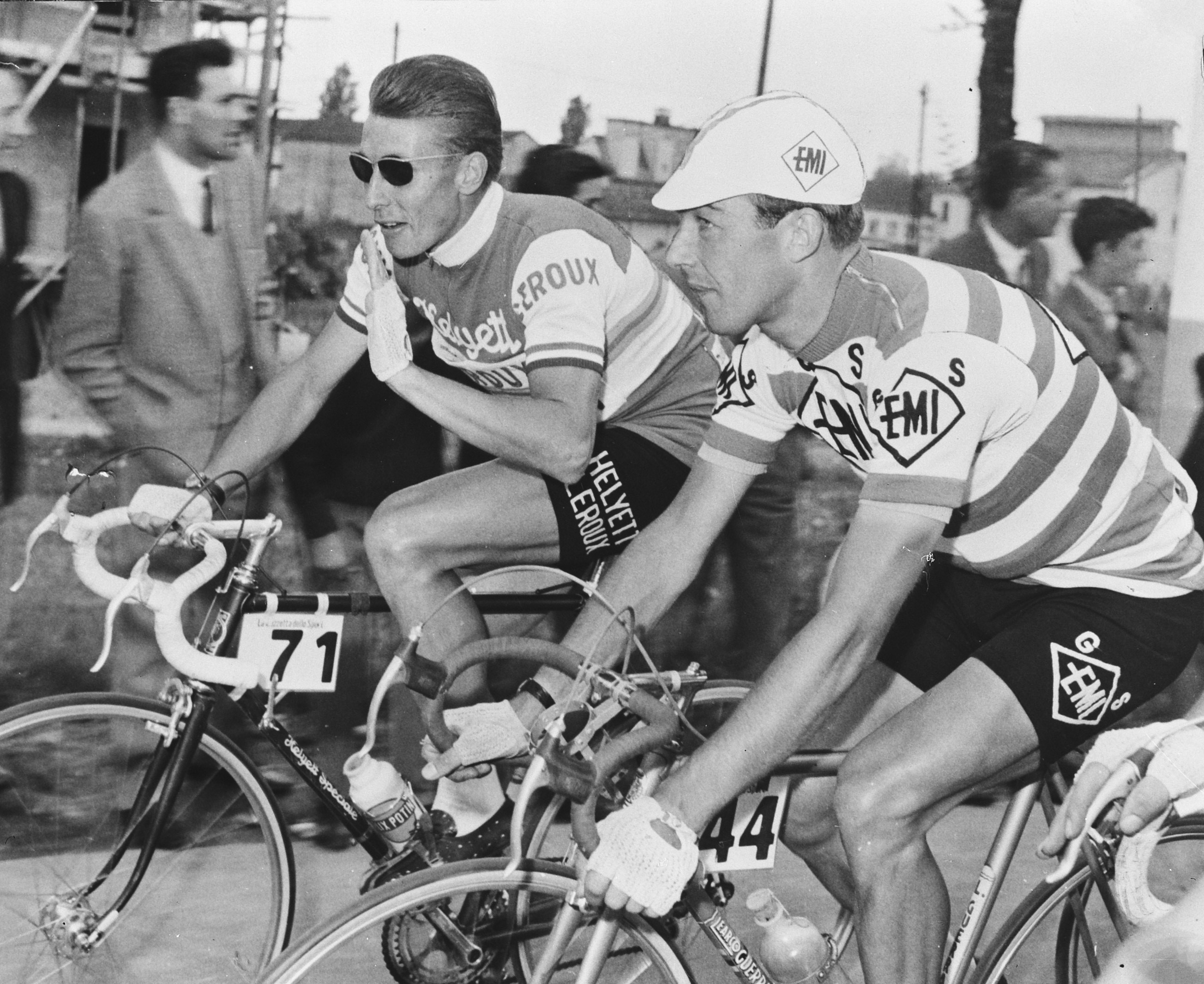
Jacques Anquetil (left) and Charly Gaul (right) riding together during the fourth stage of the race.

Around 49 km (30 mi) into the fourth stage, near Pistoie, a group of nine broke away from the peloton and established a lead of five minutes that soon grew to eleven as the stage progressed. The peloton reacted and began to increase their tempo, but they did not catch the breakaway. In the breakaway, some riders cracked leaving Arturo Neri, Armando Pellegrini, Aurelio Cestari, and Gastone Nencini at the front. Pellegrini edged out Cestari and Nencini to take the stage, while Neri dropped before the finish line and finished four seconds behind.

During the sixth leg into Naples, Seamus Elliot (Helyett–Potin) attacked from the leading breakaway as the stage came to a close, primarily because of sprinter Miguel Poblet's (Ignis) presence in the breakaway. He went under one kilometer left before he cramped with 400 m (1,312 ft) remaining and was overtaken. Poblet won the stage, while Elliot held on to get 10th place. The next day's stage was a 9 km (6 mi) climbing individual time trial along a road on Mount Vesuvius, which ended at the observatory on the volcano. As the riders began the time trial in reverse of the standings for the general classification, contenders Anquetil and Gaul were the final two to get on the course. Anquetil again chose a larger gear (45 x 20), while Gaul chose a smaller gear (45 x 23). Anquetil was faster over the initial stretch of the race which covered the cobblestones, but after that stretch, Gaul closed the gap. Gaul finished eight seconds after Anquetil did, winning the stage by 37 seconds over Guido Boni (Tricofilina). A 31 km (19 mi) time trial followed the next day, but this time it was around the island of Ischia. The course was rather hilly and was won by Antonino Catalano (Bianchi), while with respect to the general classification, Anquetil managed to gain 22 seconds on Gaul.

San Marino was the destination of the twelfth leg and it could be reached by one road when entering from Romini, a steep and rough road. The course featured two and a half circuits before its conclusion uphill. Anquetil attacked on the flat roads before the final climb and Nino Defilippis won the stage. Anquetil, who placed third, gained time he gained on the general classification contenders, put him 34 seconds behind the leader Gaul.

After the leading riders had crossed the Costalunga during the fifteenth day, Gaul descended with an advantage on a group containing Poblet, Anquetil, and Van Looy. The riders caught and passed Gaul when he suffered a puncture on the descent. The trio opened a large gap and Poblet won the stage, while Gaul crossed 2 minutes and 33 seconds behind. This loss gave Anquetil the race lead.

In the 51 km (32 mi) time trial to Susa, Anquetil caught Gaul 22 km (14 mi) into the stage. Gaul proceeded to ride in Anquetil's slipstream for the remainder of the stage before Anquetil dropped him in the final kilometer.

== Classification leadership ==
One jersey was worn during the 1959 Giro d'Italia. The leader of the general classification – calculated by adding the stage finish times of each rider – wore a pink jersey. This classification is the most important of the race, and its winner is considered as the winner of the Giro. There were no time bonuses in 1959.

A secondary classification was the mountains classification. The climbs were ranked in first and second categories. In this ranking, points were won by reaching the summit of a climb ahead of other cyclists. There were two categories of mountains. The first category awarded 80, 60, 40, 30, and 20 points, while the second distributed 60, 40, and 20 points.

There was an intermediate sprints classification. The first three riders at each intermediate sprint received points, 60 for the winner down to 20 for the third.

Although no jersey was awarded, there was also one classification for the teams, in which the teams were awarded points for their rider's performance during the stages. This classification was named the "Ramazzotti" classification, and points were given for high positions in stages, intermediate sprints, mountain tops, and leading the general classification. Bonus points were given to the points scored by a stage winner on mountain passes and intermediate sprints, and for the team that scored the most points.

Classification leadership by stage
Stage	Winner	General classification	Mountains classification	Intermediate sprints classification	Team classification
1	Rik Van Looy	Rik Van Looy	not awarded	not awarded	Faema–Guerra
2	Jacques Anquetil	Jacques Anquetil	not awarded	not awarded	Faema–Guerra
3	Charly Gaul	Charly Gaul	Charly Gaul	Adriano Zamboni	Faema–Guerra
4	Armando Pellegrini	Charly Gaul	Charly Gaul & Armando Pellegrini	Adriano Zamboni	EMI
5	Rik Van Looy	Charly Gaul	Charly Gaul & Jos Hoevenaers	Angelo Conterno	Faema–Guerra
6	Miguel Poblet	Charly Gaul	Charly Gaul & Jos Hoevenaers	Angelo Conterno	Faema–Guerra
7	Charly Gaul	Charly Gaul	Charly Gaul	Angelo Conterno	Faema–Guerra
8	Antonino Catalano	Charly Gaul	Charly Gaul	Angelo Conterno	Faema–Guerra
9	Gastone Nencini	Charly Gaul	Charly Gaul	Angelo Conterno	EMI
10	Rino Benedettii	Charly Gaul	Charly Gaul	Angelo Conterno	EMI
11	Rik Van Looy	Charly Gaul	Charly Gaul	Angelo Conterno	Faema–Guerra
12	Nino Defilippis	Charly Gaul	Charly Gaul	Angelo Conterno	EMI
13	Miguel Poblet	Charly Gaul	Charly Gaul	Angelo Conterno	Faema–Guerra
14	Rik Van Looy	Charly Gaul	Charly Gaul	Angelo Conterno	EMI
15	Miguel Poblet	Jacques Anquetil	Charly Gaul	Angelo Conterno	EMI
16	Alessandro Fantini	Jacques Anquetil	Charly Gaul	Angelo Conterno	EMI
17	Arigo Padovan	Jacques Anquetil	Charly Gaul	Angelo Conterno	Atala–Pirelli–Lygi
18	Vito Favero	Jacques Anquetil	Charly Gaul	Angelo Conterno	Atala–Pirelli–Lygi
19	Jacques Anquetil	Jacques Anquetil	Charly Gaul	Angelo Conterno	Atala–Pirelli–Lygi
20	Alfredo Sabbadin	Jacques Anquetil	Charly Gaul	Angelo Conterno	Atala–Pirelli–Lygi
21	Charly Gaul	Charly Gaul	Charly Gaul	Angelo Conterno	Atala–Pirelli–Lygi
22	Rolf Graf	Charly Gaul	Charly Gaul	Angelo Conterno	Atala–Pirelli–Lygi
Final		Charly Gaul	Charly Gaul	Angelo Conterno	Atala–Pirelli–Lygi

== Final standings ==
Legend
Pink jersey	Denotes the winner of the General classification

=== General classification ===
Final general classification (1–10)
Rank	Name	Team	Time
1	Charly Gaul (LUX)	EMI	101h 50' 54"
2	Jacques Anquetil (FRA)	Helyett-Potin	+ 6' 12"
3	Diego Ronchini (ITA)	Bianchi–Pirelli	+ 6' 16"
4	Rik Van Looy (BEL)	Faema–Guerra	+ 7' 17"
5	Imerio Massignan (ITA)	Legnano–Pirelli	+ 7' 31"
6	Miguel Poblet (ESP)	Ignis–Frejus	+ 10' 21"
7	Graziano Battistini (ITA)	Legnano–Pirelli	+ 10' 47"
8	Guido Carlesi (ITA)	Molteni	+ 13' 35"
9	Ernesto Bono (ITA)	San Pellegrino	+ 13' 36"
10	Gastone Nencini (ITA)	Carpano	+ 13' 49"

=== Mountains classification ===
Final mountains classification (1–10)
	Name	Team	Points
1	Charly Gaul (LUX)	EMI	560
2	Imerio Massignan (ITA)	Legnano–Pirelli	320
3	Hans Junkermann (GER)	Faema–Guerra	300
4	Vito Favero (ITA)	Atala–Pirelli–Lygi	250
5	Graziano Battistini (ITA)	Legnano–Pirelli	110
6	Jos Hoevenaers (BEL)	Faema–Guerra	100
6	Aurelio Cestari (ITA)	Atala–Pirelli–Lygi	100
6	Angelo Conterno (ITA)	Carpano	100
9	Pasquale Fornara (ITA)	EMI	90
10	Armando Pellegrini (ITA)	EMI	80
10	Jacques Anquetil (FRA)	Helyett-Potin	80
10	Rik Van Looy (BEL)	Faema–Guerra	80
10	Michele Gismondi (ITA)	Tricofilina	80
10	André Darrigade (FRA)	Helyett-Potin	80
10	Nino Defilippis (ITA)	Carpano	80

=== Intermediate sprints classification ===
Final intermediate sprints classification (1–8)
	Name	Team	Points
1	Angelo Conterno (ITA)	Carpano	200
2	Guido Carlesi (ITA)	Molteni	140
3	Armando Pellegrini (ITA)	EMI	120
3	Cleto Maule (ITA)	Carpano	120
3	Rik Van Looy (BEL)	Faema	120
6	Rino Benedetti (ITA)	Ghighi	100
6	Michele Gismondi (ITA)	Tricofilina	100
8	Ernesto Bono (ITA)	San Pellegrino	80

=== Team classification ===
Final team classification (1–10)
	Team	Points
1	Atala–Pirelli–Lygi	4115
2	EMI	3830
3	Faema–Guerra	2990
4	Carpano	2700
5	Helyett-Potin	2070
6	Legnano–Pirelli	2035
7	Ignis–Frejus	1980
8	Ghigi–Ganna	1555
9	Molteni	1190
10	Bianchi–Pirelli	1157.5

== Aftermath ==
This was the first edition of the Giro d'Italia where an Italian did not lead the general classification after any stage. La Gazzetta wrote that the collective performance of the Italians in the Giro did not live up to expectations.
