= Fernand Lamy (cyclist) =

French cyclist (1931–2003)

Personal information
- Born: 4 November 1931 Meaux, France
- Died: 3 September 2003 (aged 71) Cannes, France

Cycling career
- Sport: Cycling
- Role: Rider

Fernand Lamy (4 November 1931 – 6 September 2003) was a French racing cyclist. He rode in the 1958 Tour de France. Lamy died in Cannes on 6 September 2003, at the age of 71.
