= Moustoir-Ac =

Moustoir-Ac Moustoer-Logunec'h
- Commune
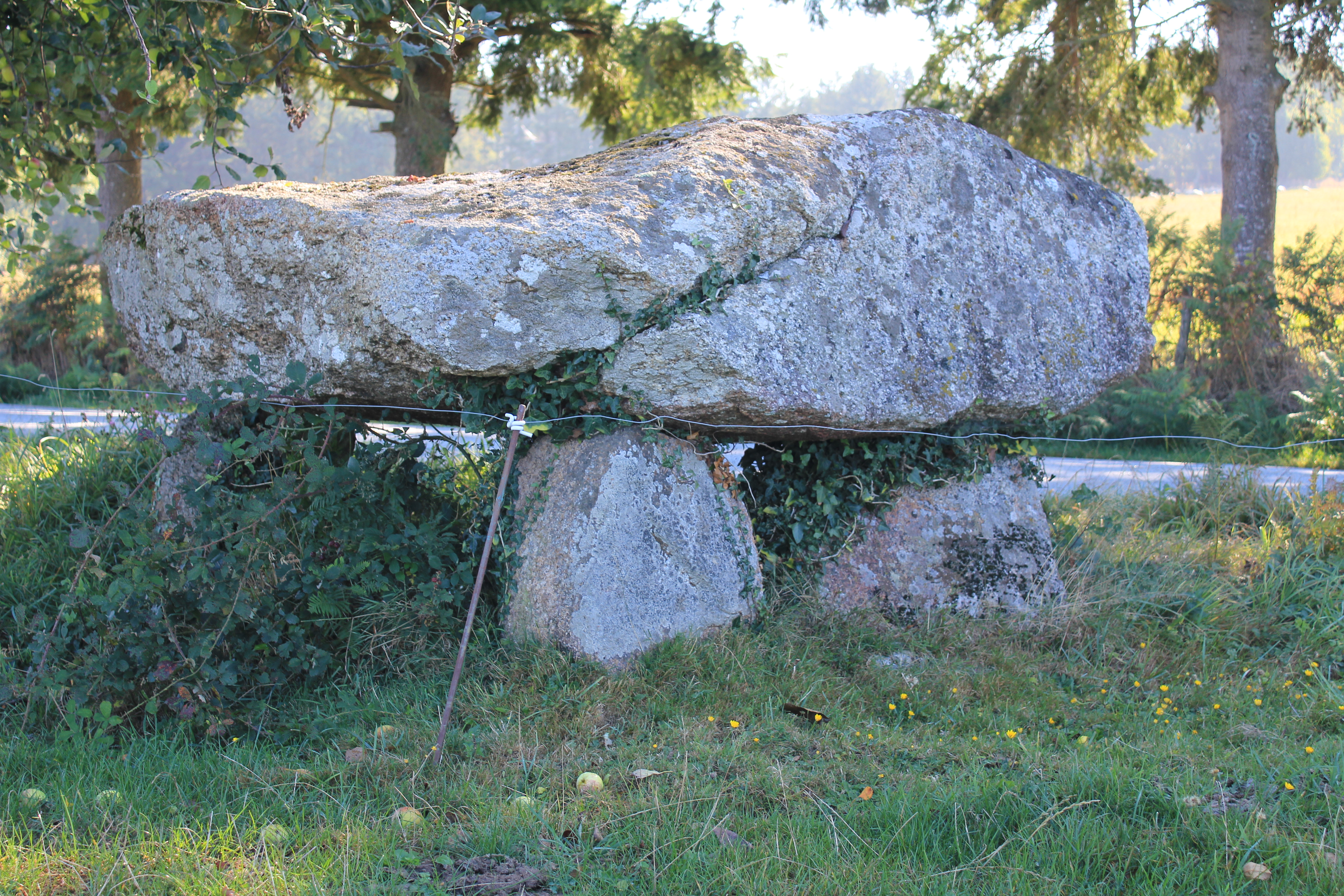
- The Dolmen of Kermorvant, in Moustoir-Ac
- Location of Moustoir-Ac
- Location within France Location within Brittany
- Coordinates: 47°51′23″N 2°50′03″W
- Country: France
- Region: Brittany
- Department: Morbihan
- Arrondissement: Pontivy
- Canton: Grand-Champ
- Intercommunality: Centre Morbihan Communauté

Government
  - Mayor (2026–32): Benoît Rolland
- Area^{1}: 33.92 km^{2} (13.10 sq mi)
- Highest elevation: 176 m (577 ft)
- Lowest elevation: 46 m (151 ft)
- Population (2023): 1,775
  - Density: 52.33/km^{2} (135.5/sq mi)
- Time zone: UTC+01:00 (CET)
  - Summer (DST): UTC+02:00 (CEST)
- INSEE/Postal code: 56141 /56500
- ^{1} French Land Register data, which excludes lakes, ponds, glaciers > 1 km^{2} (0.386 sq mi or 247 acres) and river estuaries.

Moustoir-Ac (French pronunciation: [mustwaʁ ak]; Breton: Moustoer-Logunec'h) is a commune in the Morbihan department of Brittany in north-western France. Inhabitants of Moustoir-Ac are called in French Moustoiracais.

== See also ==
- Communes of the Morbihan department
