= Rizzardo Brenioli =

Italian cyclist (1930–1993)

Personal information
- Born: 28 June 1930
- Died: 15 December 1993 (aged 63)

Cycling career
- Sport: Cycling
- Role: Rider

Rizzardo Brenioli (28 June 1930 – 15 December 1993) was an Italian racing cyclist. He rode in the 1958 Tour de France.
