= Hans Andresen =

Danish cyclist

Personal information
- Full name: Hans Edmund Andresen
- Born: 3 October 1927 Vedbæk, Denmark
- Died: 7 February 2014 (aged 86)

Cycling career
- Sport: Cycling
- Discipline: Road
- Role: Rider
Medal record
Representing Denmark
Men's road bicycle racing
World Championships
Silver medal – second place	1954 Solingen	Amateur's Road Race

Hans Edmund Andresen (3 October 1927 – 7 February 2014) was a Danish cyclist. He competed at the 1948 and 1952 Summer Olympics. He also rode in the 1958 Tour de France.
