= Antonino Catalano =

Italian cyclist

Personal information
- Born: 3 July 1932
- Died: 20 April 1987 (aged 54)

Cycling career
- Sport: Cycling
- Role: Rider

Antonino Catalano (3 July 1932 – 20 April 1987) was an Italian racing cyclist. He won stage 8 of the 1959 Giro d'Italia.
