= Arigo Padovan =

Italian cyclist (1927–2025)

Arrigo Padovan
Personal information
- Born: 16 June 1927 Castelbaldo, Italy
- Died: 4 January 2025 (aged 97)

Cycling career
- Sport: Cycling
- Discipline: Road
- Role: Rider

Major wins
- 2 stages Tour de France; 3 stages Giro d'Italia

Arrigo Padovan (16 June 1927 – 4 January 2025) was an Italian professional road bicycle racer, who won stages in both the Tour de France and the Giro d'Italia. He died on 4 January 2025, at the age of 97.

== Major results ==
1951
Gran Premio Industria e Commercio di Prato
Giro d'Italia:

8th place overall classification

1952
Bolzano - Trento
GP Industria in Belmonte-Piceno
1955
Giro di Toscana
1956
Giro d'Itala:

Winner stage 8

Tour de France:

Winner stage 3

1958
Tour de France:

Winner stage 11

1959
Giro d'Itala:

Winner stage 17

1960
Giro d'Itala:

Winner stage 21
