= Aldo Bolzan =

Luxembourgish cyclist

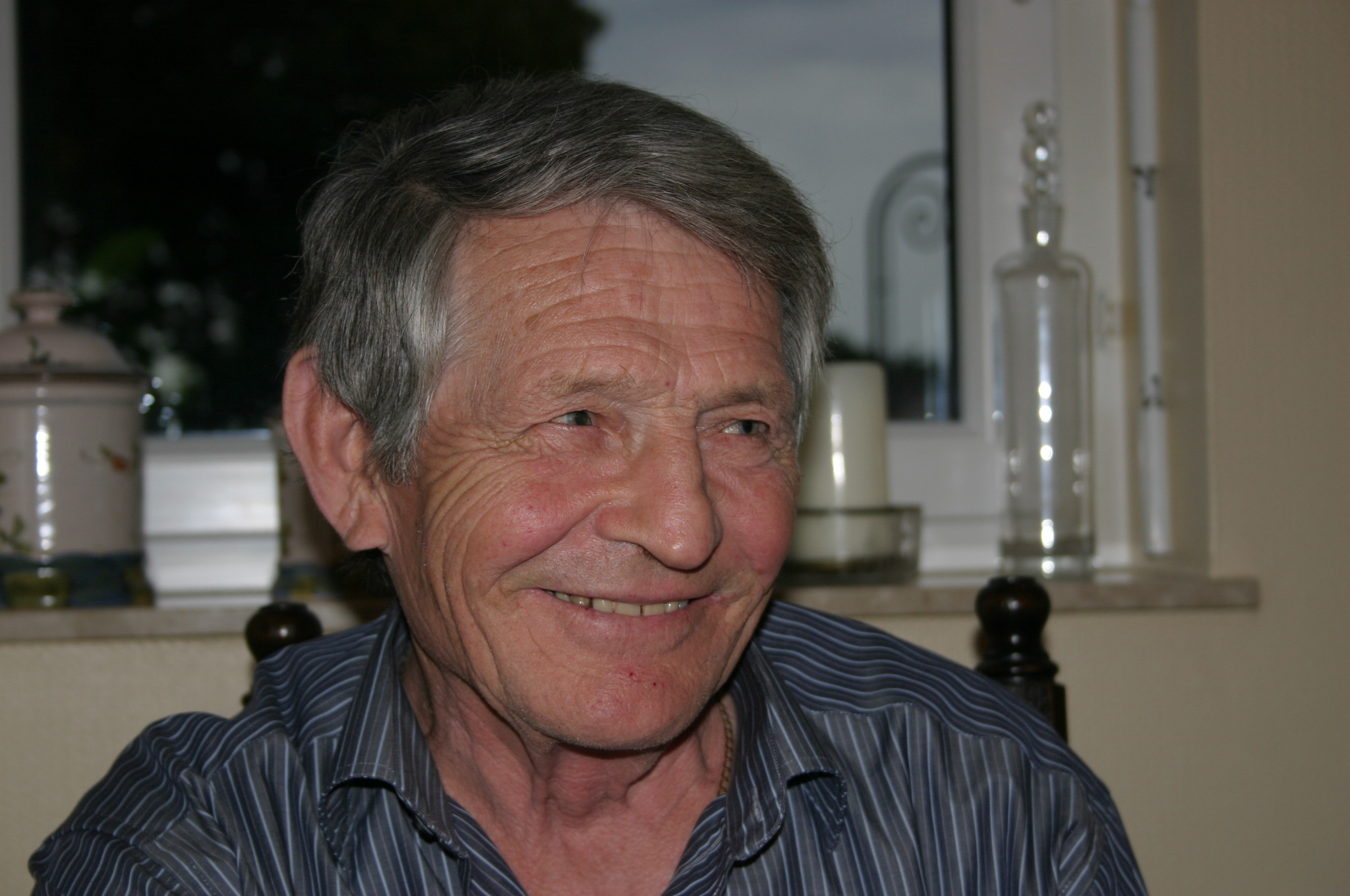
- Aldo Bolzan in 2006

Personal information
- Born: 6 September 1933 Esch-sur-Alzette, Luxembourg
- Died: 21 October 2013 (aged 80) Luxembourg, Luxembourg

Cycling career
- Sport: Cycling
- Role: Rider

Aldo Bolzan (6 September 1933 – 21 October 2013) was a Luxembourgish professional racing cyclist. He rode in six editions of the Tour de France. Italian by birth, he was naturalized on 22 July 1960.
