= Pietro Nascimbene =

Italian cyclist (1930–2022)

Personal information
- Born: 22 February 1930 Montalto Pavese, Italy
- Died: 4 August 2022 (aged 92) Borgoratto Mormorolo, Italy

Cycling career
- Sport: Cycling
- Role: Rider

Pietro Nascimbene (22 February 1930 – 4 August 2022) was an Italian racing cyclist. He won stage 12 of the 1956 Giro d'Italia. died in Borgoratto Mormorolo on 4 August 2022, at the age of 92.
