= Ernst Traxel =

Swiss cyclist

Personal information
- Born: 23 November 1933 (age 92) Silenen, Switzerland

Cycling career
- Sport: Cycling
- Role: Rider

Ernst Traxel (born 23 November 1933) is a Swiss former professional racing cyclist. He rode in three editions of the Tour de France.
