= Joseph Morvan =

French cyclist

Personal information
- Nickname: La Locomotive de Colpo
- Born: 3 December 1924 Moustoir-Ac, France
- Died: 26 July 1999 (aged 74) Colpo, France

Cycling career
- Sport: Cycling
- Discipline: Road
- Role: Rider

Major wins
- Paris–Bourges (1956)

Joseph Morvan (Moustoir-Ac, 3 December 1924 – Colpo, 26 July 1999) was a French professional road bicycle racer. Morvan had his most successful year in 1956, when he won Paris–Bourges and stage in the Tour de France.

== Major results ==
1949
Manche-Océan
1951
Manche-Océan
Quimper
1955
Manche-Océan
Comfort-Meillant
1956
Le Bono
Paris–Bourges
Plonéour-Lavern
Pontivy
Vitré
Tour de France:

Winner stage 5

Manche-Océan
1957
Etoile du Léon
Trédion
Manche-Océan
1958
Aubusson
Languidic
Pont-l'Abbé
Manche-Océan
1960
Hennebont
Circuit du Cher
1961
Châteaulin
Boucles de l'Aulne
