= Martin Van Geneugden =

Belgian cyclist

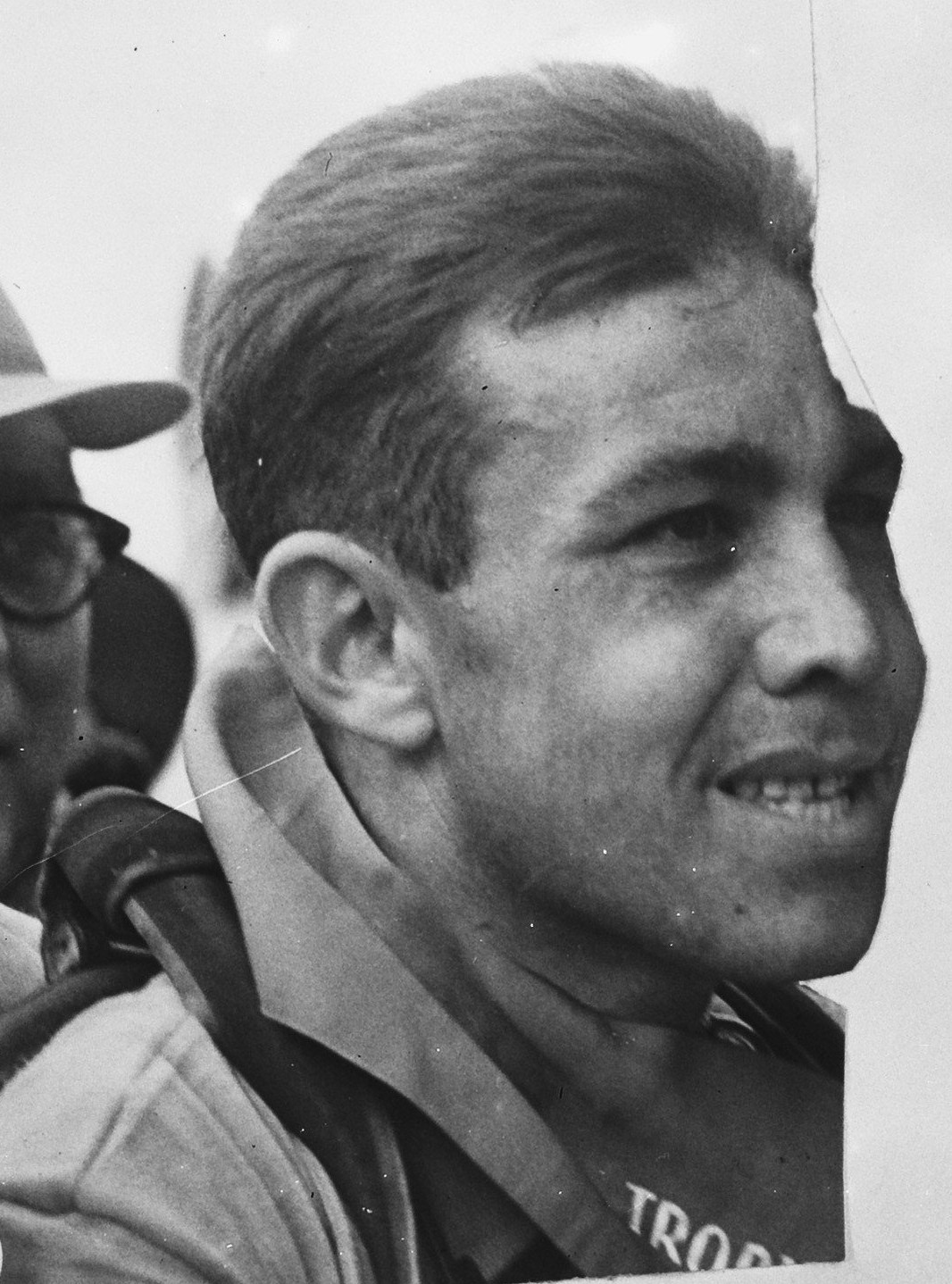
- Van Geneugden after winning stage 6 of the 1958 Tour de France

Personal information
- Full name: Martin Van Geneugden
- Born: 21 January 1932 Zutendaal, Belgium
- Died: 6 July 2014 (aged 82)

Cycling career
- Sport: Cycling
- Discipline: Road
- Role: Rider

Major wins
- 6 stages Tour de France

Martin Van Geneugden (21 January 1932 – 8 July 2014) was a Belgian professional road bicycle racer from 1953 to 1963. He won 6 stages in the Tour de France.

== Major results ==
1950
Belgium national amateur road race champion
1953
Jemeppe
Velaines
Winterslag
Paris - Valenciennes
Tour de France:

Winner stage 6

1954
Houthalen-Helchteren
1955
Houthalen-Helchteren
Tongeren
1956
Borgerhout
Denderleeuw
Zutendaal
1957
Hoegaarden - Antwerpen - Hoegaarden
Hanret
Tienen
1958
Eijsden
GP Fichtel & Sachs
Hasselt
Tour de France

Winner stages 5 and 12

Omloop van Midden-België
1959
Hoepertingen
1960
Tour de France

Winner stages 9 and 14

Omloop van de fruitstreek Alken
Omloop van Limburg
1961
Tour de France

Winner stage 18

Omloop van de fruitstreek Alken
Omloop van Limburg
1962
Dwars door Vlaanderen
1963
Eijsden
Nandrin
