= Jean-Claude Grèt =

Swiss cyclist

Personal information
- Born: 21 October 1930 Lausanne, Switzerland
- Died: 10 July 2001 (aged 70) Yvonand, Switzerland

Cycling career
- Sport: Cycling
- Role: Rider

Jean-Claude Grèt (21 October 1930 – 10 July 2001) was a Swiss racing cyclist. He was the Swiss National Road Race champion in 1958.
