= Emilio Bottecchia =

Italian cyclist (1933–2003)

Personal information
- Born: 25 December 1933 San Martino di Colle Umberto, Italy
- Died: 27 September 2003 (aged 69)

Cycling career
- Sport: Cycling
- Role: Rider

Emilio Bottecchia (25 December 1933 – 27 September 2003) was an Italian racing cyclist. He rode in the 1958 Tour de France. Bottecchia died on 27 September 2003, at the age of 69.
