= Jef Planckaert =

Belgian cyclist

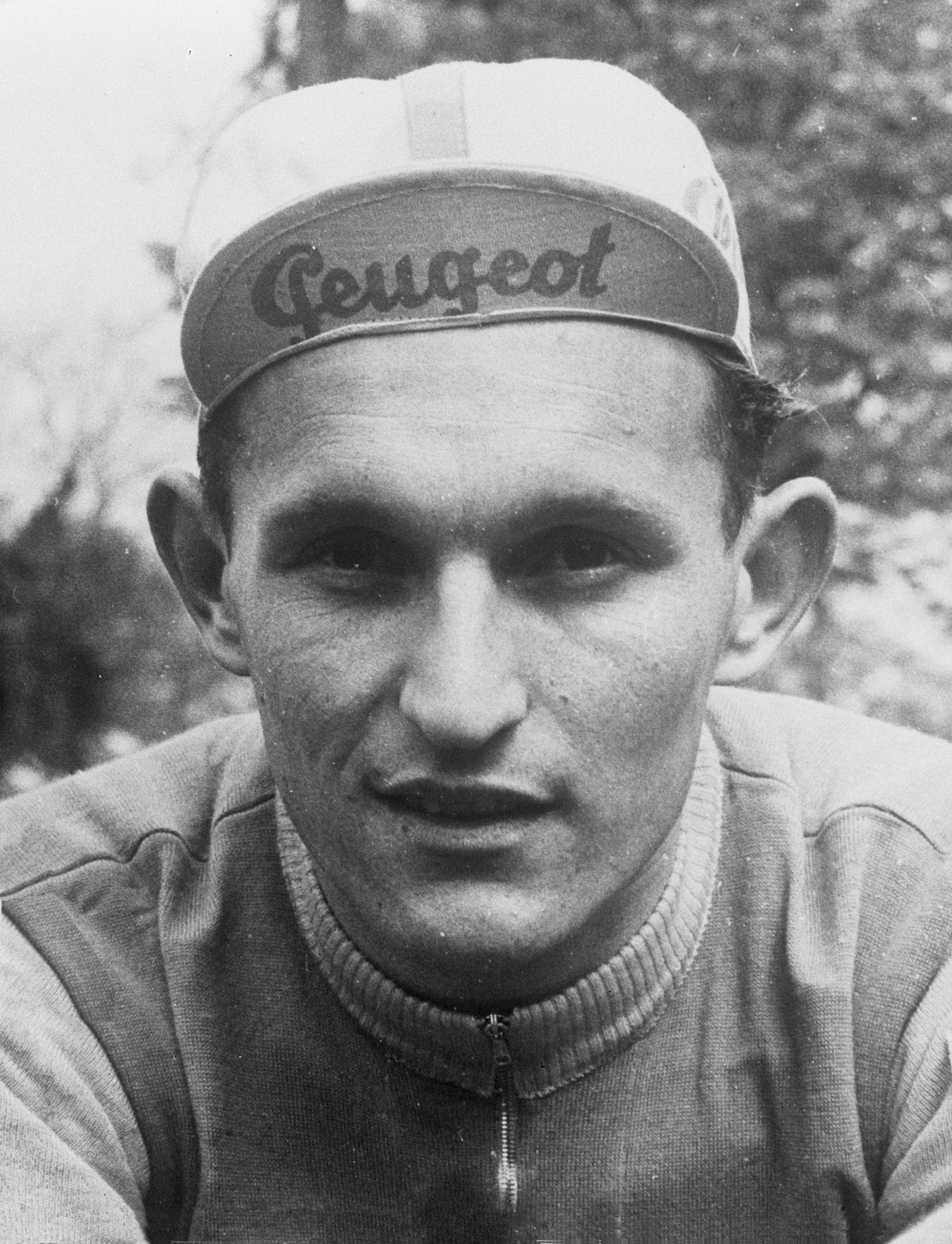
- Planckaert in 1962

Personal information
- Full name: Joseph Planckaert
- Born: 4 May 1934 Poperinge, Belgium
- Died: 22 May 2007 (aged 73) Otegem. Belgium

Cycling career
- Sport: Cycling
- Discipline: Road
- Role: Rider

Professional team
- 1954–1965: –

Major wins
- Grand Tours Tour de France 1 individual stage (1961) Stage races Tour de Luxembourg (1962) Four Days of Dunkirk (1957, 1960, 1963) One-day races and Classics National Road Race Championships (1962) Liège–Bastogne–Liège (1962) Omloop Het Volk (1958)

Joseph "Jef" Planckaert (4 May 1934 – 22 May 2007) was a Belgian racing cyclist. He is considered one of the best Belgian cyclists of the 1950s and 1960s.

His best season was 1962, when he became Belgian champion at the Citadel of Namur. He won Paris–Nice and the Tour de Luxembourg, won Liège–Bastogne–Liège, and finished second in the Tour de France. He also won Omloop Het Volk in 1958 and Four Days of Dunkirk in 1957, 1960, and 1963.

In the Tour de France, he finished in the top 20 six times in the final standings. In 1961, he won the 6th stage. In 1962, he wore the yellow jersey for 7 consecutive days. Planckaert retired in 1965.

== Major results ==
1954
Gent-Staden
GP d'Isbuerges
Liedekerke
Langemark
1955
Omloop der Zuid-West-Vlaamse Bergen
Kuurne – Brussel – Kuurne
1956
Moorsele
Zwevegem
Kortrijk
1957
Diksmuide
Four days of Dunkirk
Sint-Amands
1958
Trofeo Fenaroli
Omloop Het Volk
Zwevegem
1959
Nationale sluitingsprijs
Beernem
Braine-le-Comte
1960
Kuurne – Brussel – Kuurne
Four days of Dunkirk
Vichte
1961
Handzame
Gullegem
Oostende
Zwevegem
Wortegem
1962
Bellegem
Grand Prix du Parisien
Paris–Nice
Liège–Bastogne–Liège
Tour de Luxembourg
Belgium national road race champion
Zwevegem
Visé
1963
Ploërdut
Handzame
Four days of Dunkirk
Kortrijk
Wortegem
1964
GP du Tournaisis
Stadsprijs Geraardsbergen
Wetteren
Kemzeke
1965
Ruiselede

== Tour de France results ==
- 1957 Tour de France – 16th
- 1958 Tour de France – 6th
- 1959 Tour de France – 17th
- 1960 Tour de France – 5th
- 1961 Tour de France – 15th; winner of 6th stage
- 1962 Tour de France – 2nd
- 1965 Tour de France – 56th

== Teams ==
- 1954 – Alcyon-Dunlop
- 1955 – Elvé-Peugeot
- 1956 – Elvé-Peugeot
- 1957 – Peugeot-BP
- 1958 – Carpano
- 1959 – Carpano
- 1960 – Flandria-Wiel's
- 1961 – Wiel's-Flandria
- 1962 – Flandria-Faema
- 1963 – Faema-Flandria
- 1964 – Flandria-Romeo
- 1965 – Solo-Superia
