= Piet Damen =

Dutch cyclist

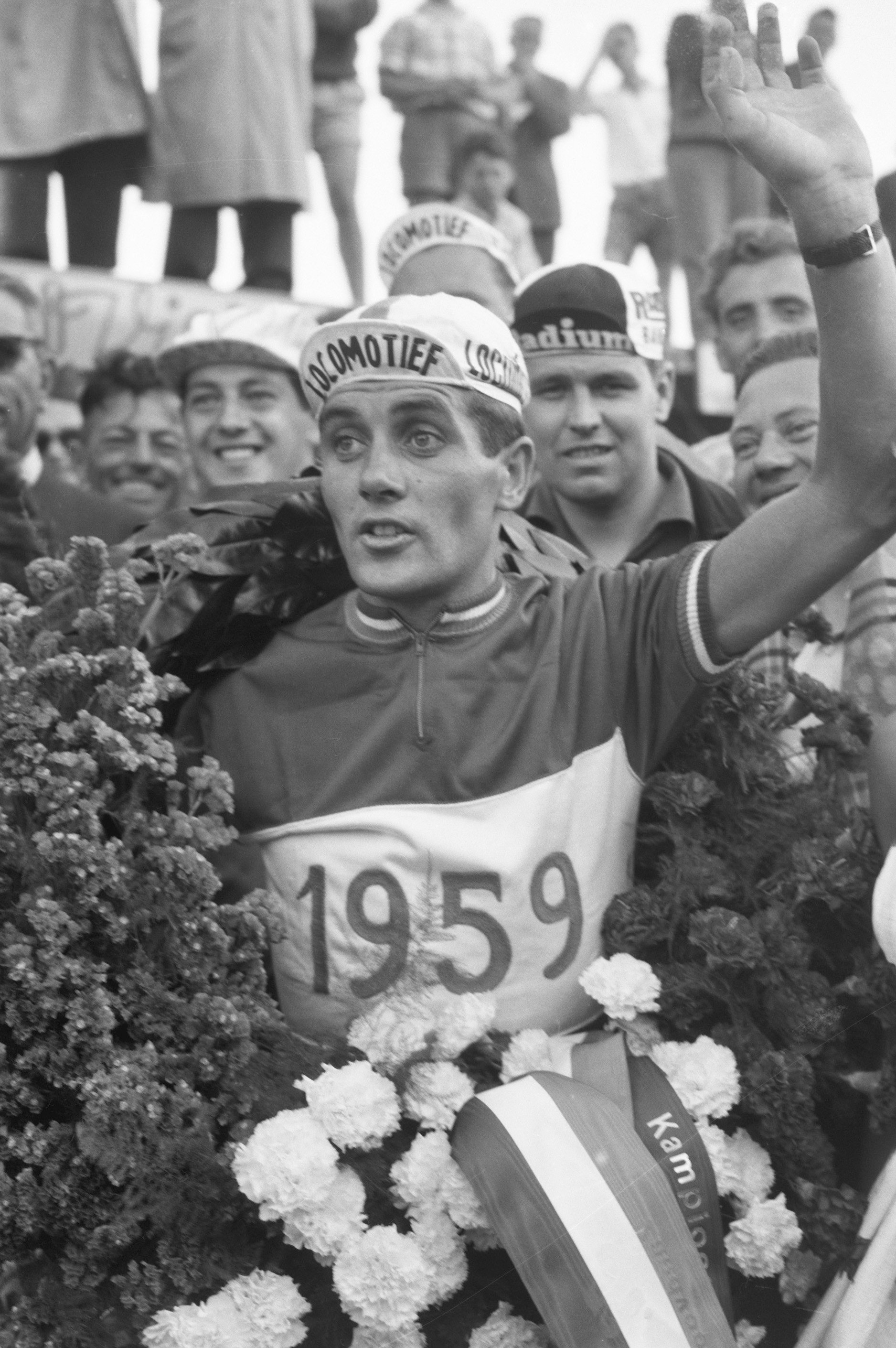
- Damen after winning the national road title in 1959

Personal information
- Born: 20 July 1934 (age 92) Lieshout, the Netherlands

Cycling career
- Sport: Cycling
- Role: Rider

Piet Damen (born 20 July 1934) is a Dutch former professional racing cyclist. He rode the Tour de France in 1958–1961 and 1964 with the best result of 11th place in 1958. Damen won the Peace Race in 1958.
