= Vito Favero =

Italian cyclist (1932–2014)

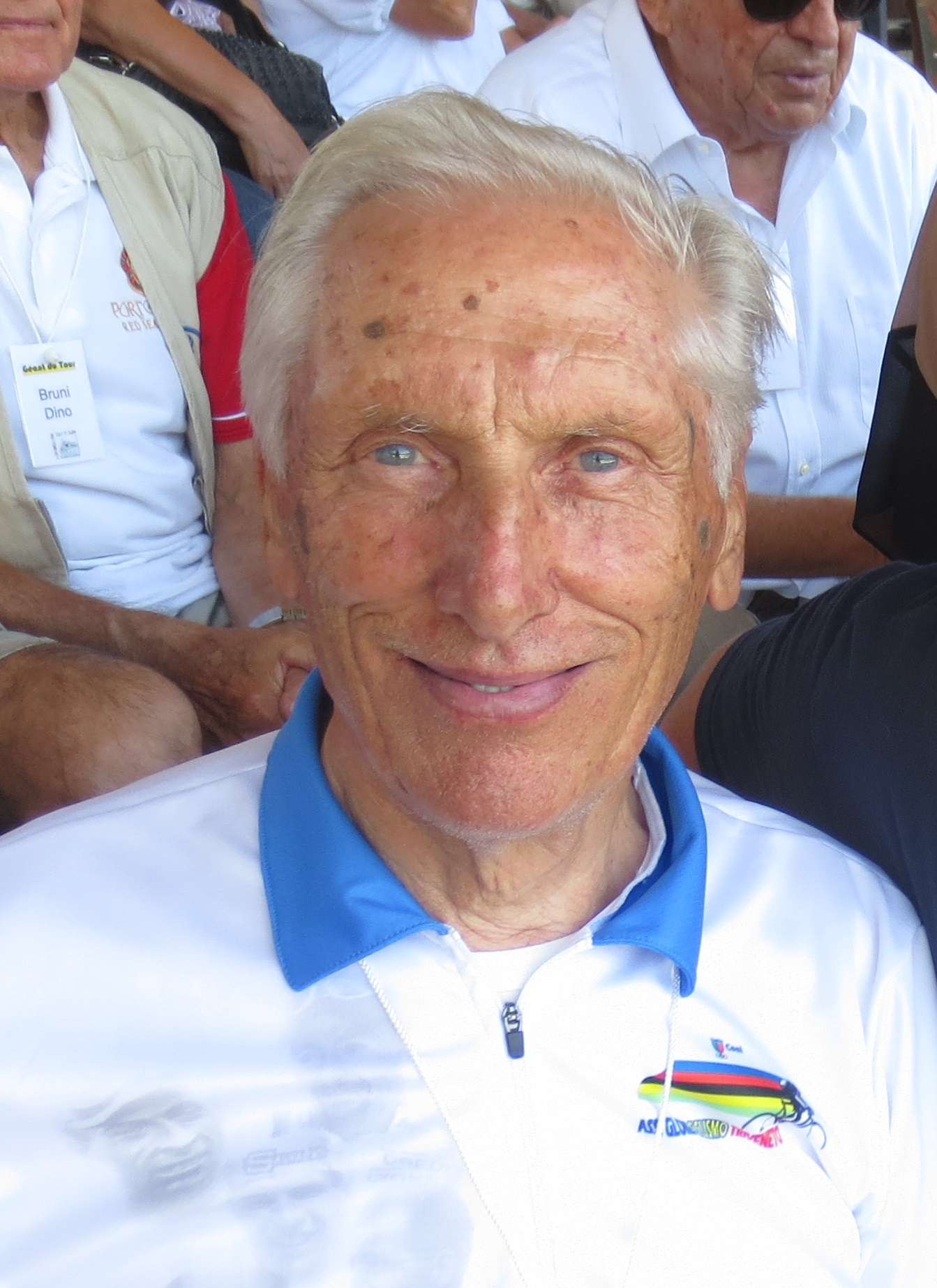

Personal information
- Full name: Vito Favero
- Born: 21 October 1932 Sarmede, Italy
- Died: 16 May 2014 (aged 81) Sarmede, Italy

Cycling career
- Sport: Cycling
- Discipline: Road
- Role: Rider

Professional teams
- 1956: Bottecchia-Vitabrill
- 1957: Bottecchia-Gripo
- 1958-1959: Atala-Pirelli
- 1960-1961: Atala
- 1962: Torpado

Major wins
- 2nd place 1958 Tour de France,6 days in yellow jersey 1 stage in 1959 Tour de France

Vito Favero (21 October 1932 – 16 May 2014) was an Italian road racing cyclist. He was professional from 1956 to 1962. In the 1958 Tour de France, he finished second. Stage 14 of the 1958 Tour was won by Federico Bahamontes but Favero took over the Yellow Jersey. At that point, he was already the 8th different rider to lead the race, and he would hold his lead for four stages when Charly Gaul won stage 18 and Raphaël Géminiani took over as the 9th different rider to lead the race. Géminiani would hold the lead for three stages, but in stage 21, Favero retook the lead as Gaul added another stage win. Favero would remain in Yellow for another two stages until Gaul won the final time trial and became the record-setting eleventh rider to wear the Maillot Jaune in a single edition of the Tour.

The 1958 Tour de France has been compared to the 2006 Tour de France: Both Charly Gaul and Floyd Landis were favourites halfway the Tour, both lost dramatically at a stage, but at a later stage made a great comeback, which put them close to the two leaders (Favero-Raphaël Géminiani) and Óscar Pereiro-Carlos Sastre), and the day before the last stage to Paris they overtook the two leaders in an individual time trial.

Favero would also start the 1959 Tour de France, which he did not finish. During his impressive 1958 Tour, he did not win any stages, but he would win stage 2 of the 1959 Tour.

== Major results ==
1956
2nd place in 8th stage of Critérium du Dauphiné Libéré
2nd place in the Tour of Europe
1957
1958
1958 Tour de France: 2nd place overall, 6 days in yellow jersey
Winner in Geneva
1959
1959 Tour de France: did not finish, won stage 2
Paris–Nice: winner of stages 2 and 5B
Prix de Nantua
1960
2nd place in the Tour of Lazio.
1961
1961 Tour de France: did not finish
2nd place in the Tour of Reggio Calabria.
