= Pierre Polo =

Italian cyclist

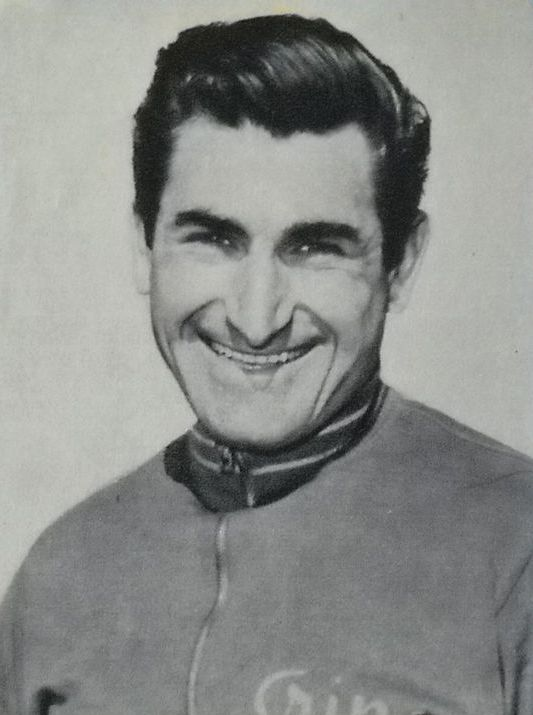

Personal information
- Born: 24 April 1928

Cycling career
- Sport: Cycling
- Role: Rider

Pierre Polo (born 24 April 1928) was an Italian racing cyclist. He rode in the 1954 Tour de France.
