= Jos Hoevenaers =

Belgian cyclist

- Hoevenaers pictured in 1960

Personal information
- Full name: Jos Hoevenaers
- Born: Joseph Hoevenaers; 30 November 1932 Antwerp, Belgium
- Died: 14 June 1995 (aged 62) Wilrijk, Belgium

Cycling career
- Sport: Cycling
- Discipline: Road
- Role: Rider
- Rider type: Attacker, climber

Professional teams
- 1956-1959: Faema-Guerra
- 1960-1961: Ghigi
- 1962: Philco
- 1963: Peugeot-Wolber
- 1964: Flandria-Roméo
- 1965: Cynar-Allegro
- 1966: Mann-Grundig
- 1967: Goldor-Gerka

Major wins
- Grand Tours Tour de France 4 days yellow jersey (1958, 1959) Other stage races Gran Premio Ciclomotoristico (1958) Tour de Romandie Mountains classification (1960) One-day races and Classics La Flèche Wallonne (1959) Scheldeprijs (1964)
Medal record
Representing Belgium
Men's road bicycle racing
World Championships
| Bronze medal – third place | 1962 Salò | Road Race |

Jos Hoevenaers (30 November 1932, in Antwerp – 14 June 1995, in Wilrijk) was a Belgian cyclist, reputed for his attacking style.

In 1960, he wore the pink jersey of leadership for eight days in the Giro d'Italia; however, Jacques Anquetil won instead. Bad luck, as well as inadequate time-trialling and sprinting, stopped Hoevenaers' becoming the best Belgian Tour rider of his generation.

== Major results ==
1955
1st Berliner Rundfahrt (U23)
1st Week-end Spadois

1956
1st Berliner Rundfahrt (U23)
1st Liège-Marche-Liège
1st overall classification Ster van Ieper

1957
1st Omloop der drie Provinciën
1st Omloop van Midden-België
1st Stage 3a Volta a Catalunya

1958
1st Omloop Mandel-Leie-Schelde
1st Overall Roma–Napoli–Roma
3rd Bordeaux–Paris
10th Overall Tour de France

1959
1st La Flèche Wallonne
1st Omloop van Midden-België
1st Circuit de Louest à Mons
2nd Gent–Wevelgem
4th Overall Roma–Napoli–Roma
7th Ronde van Limburg
8th Overall Tour de France

1960
1st Stage 1a Driedaagse van Antwerpen
1st Stage 2 Brussel-Sint-Truiden
3rd Overall Tour de Romandie

1st Mountains classification

2nd Tour du Doubs
2nd Grand Prix Stan Ockers
4th Schaal Sels
5th Overall Giro d'Italia
5th Overall Roma–Napoli–Roma
6th Tour de Wallonie

1961
1st Schaal Sels
2nd Gran Piemonte
National Championships

1st Interclubs road race
3rd Road race

3rd Coppa Sabatini
3rd Elfstedenronde
4th De Drie Zustersteden
8th Overall Roma–Napoli–Roma

1962
1st Omloop van Midden-België
2nd Tre Valli Varesine
2nd Giro del Ticino
2nd overall Giro di Campania
3rd Road race, UCI World Championships
3rd Omloop der Vlaamse Gewesten
9th Giro di Lombardia

1963
1st Sint Amands
2nd Gullegem Koerse
3rd Ronde van Limburg
7th National Championships, Road race
8th Bordeaux–Paris

1964
1st Omloop van Midden-Brabant
1st Scheldeprijs
1st Berner Rundfahrt
1st SUPER 8 Classic
3rd Giro di Lombardia

1965
1st GP Benego
1st Zuid-West-Vlaamse Bergen
2nd München–Zürich
8th Grand Prix of Aargau Canton

== Tours de France ==
- 1958 – 10th, 1 day in yellow jersey
- 1959 – 8th, 3 days in yellow jersey
- 1961 – 11th
- 1962 – 18th
- 1963 – 23rd
