= Édouard Delberghe =

French cyclist

Personal information
- Born: 4 October 1935 Viesly, France
- Died: 2 September 1994 (aged 58) Reims, France

Cycling career
- Sport: Cycling
- Role: Rider

Édouard Delberghe (4 October 1935 – 2 September 1994) was a French professional racing cyclist. He rode in eight editions of the Tour de France.
