= List of teams and cyclists in the 1962 Vuelta a España =

For the 1962 Vuelta a España, the field consisted of 90 riders; 48 finished the race.

== By rider ==
Legend
No.	Starting number worn by the rider during the Vuelta
Pos.	Position in the general classification
Time	Deficit to the winner of the general classification
DNF	Denotes a rider who did not finish

No.	Name	Nationality	Team	Pos.	Time	Ref
1	José Bernárdez	Spain	Faema	DNF	—	
2	Salvador Botella	Spain	Faema	DNF	—	
3	José Martín Colmenarejo	Spain	Faema	DNF	—	
4	Antonio Gomez del Moral	Spain	Faema	18	+ 39' 51	
5	José Herrero Berrendero	Spain	Faema	41	+ 1h 26' 05	
6	Julio Jiménez	Spain	Faema	46	+ 1h 37' 55	
7	Gabriel Mas	Spain	Faema	DNF	—	
8	Luis Mayoral Rubin	Spain	Faema	19	+ 41' 17	
9	Salvador Rosa Gómez	Spain	Faema	20	+ 42' 57	
10	José Gómez del Moral	Spain	Faema	DNF	—	
11	Rudi Altig	West Germany	Saint-Raphaël–Helyett	1	78h 35' 27	
12	Jacques Anquetil	France	Saint-Raphaël–Helyett	DNF	—	
13	Jean-Claude Annaert	France	Saint-Raphaël–Helyett	14	+ 35' 19	
14	Marcel Queheille	France	Saint-Raphaël–Helyett	DNF	—	
15	Jean Graczyk	France	Saint-Raphaël–Helyett	25	+ 47' 48	
16	Seamus Elliott	Ireland	Saint-Raphaël–Helyett	3	+ 7' 17	
17	Marcel Janssens	Belgium	Saint-Raphaël–Helyett	32	+ 1h 02' 04	
18	Jean Stablinski	France	Saint-Raphaël–Helyett	6	+ 17' 07	
19	Michel Stolker	Netherlands	Saint-Raphaël–Helyett	7	+ 17' 57	
20	Albertus Geldermans	Netherlands	Saint-Raphaël–Helyett	10	+ 20' 23	
21	Jorge Corvo	Portugal	Portugal	29	+ 52' 27	
22	Mario Silva	Portugal	Portugal	23	+ 45' 48	
23	Manuel Simoes	Portugal	Portugal	DNF	—	
24	Ilidio Do Rosario	Portugal	Portugal	DNF	—	
25	Joao Alves	Portugal	Portugal	DNF	—	
26	Francisco Valada	Portugal	Portugal	48	+ 1h 49' 02	
27	Agostinho Correia	Portugal	Portugal	DNF	—	
28	Laurentino Mendes	Portugal	Portugal	DNF	—	
29	Joao Dos Santos	Portugal	Portugal	DNF	—	
30	Victor Tenazinha	Portugal	Portugal	DNF	—	
31	Roger Baguet	Belgium	Wiel's–Groene Leeuw	15	+ 37' 40	
32	Marcel Bostoen	Belgium	Wiel's–Groene Leeuw	DNF	—	
33	Dieter Puschel	West Germany	Wiel's–Groene Leeuw	17	+ 38' 45	
34	Julien Gekiere	Belgium	Wiel's–Groene Leeuw	DNF	—	
35	Daniel Denys	Belgium	Wiel's–Groene Leeuw	DNF	—	
36	André Messelis	Belgium	Wiel's–Groene Leeuw	DNF	—	
37	Eddy Pauwels	Belgium	Wiel's–Groene Leeuw	9	+ 19' 55	
38	Alfons Sweeck	Belgium	Wiel's–Groene Leeuw	26	+ 47' 58	
39	Marcel Seynaeve	Belgium	Wiel's–Groene Leeuw	12	+ 24' 25	
40	René Van Meenen	Belgium	Wiel's–Groene Leeuw	DNF	—	
41	Nino Defilippis	Italy	Italy	DNF	—	
42	Ernesto Minetto	Italy	Italy	DNF	—	
43	Sergio Ermes Braga	Italy	Italy	30	+ 57' 06	
44	Giuseppe Sartore	Italy	Italy	DNF	—	
45	Catulo Ciacci	Italy	Italy	DNF	—	
46	Pietro Chiodini	Italy	Italy	DNF	—	
47	Ernesto Bono	Italy	Italy	36	+ 1h 08' 40	
48	Giuliano Bernardelle	Italy	Italy	DNF	—	
49	Giacomo Grioni	Italy	Italy	DNF	—	
50	Gaetano Sarazin	Italy	Italy	35	+ 1h 07' 58	
51	Antoon van der Steen	Netherlands	Netherlands	DNF	—	
52	Jan Westdorp	Netherlands	Netherlands	33	+ 1h 02' 14	
53	Pietro van der Horst	Netherlands	Netherlands	DNF	—	
54	Frits Knoops	Netherlands	Netherlands	37	+ 1h 09' 39	
55	Leo Coehorst	Netherlands	Netherlands	42	+ 1h 27' 35	
56	Alfons Steuten	Netherlands	Netherlands	DNF	—	
57	Tom Tubee	Netherlands	Netherlands	DNF	—	
58	Cees van Amsterdam	Netherlands	Netherlands	DNF	—	
59	Harry Steevens	Netherlands	Netherlands	DNF	—	
60	Jan Legrand	Netherlands	Netherlands	DNF	—	
61	Antonio Barrutia	Spain	Kas	34	+ 1h 03' 23	
62	Francisco Gabica	Spain	Kas	5	+ 10' 31	
63	Antonio Karmany	Spain	Kas	21	+ 43' 05	
64	Carmelo Morales	Spain	Kas	DNF	—	
65	Miguel Pacheco Font	Spain	Kas	4	+ 10' 21	
66	Manuel Martin Pinera	Spain	Kas	47	+ 1h 47' 19	
67	José Segú	Spain	Kas	22	+ 44' 24	
68	José Urrestarazu	Spain	Kas	31	+ 1h 01' 06	
69	Eusebio Vélez	Spain	Kas	11	+ 22' 10	
70	Juan Jorge Nicolau	Spain	Kas	38	+ 1h 13' 51	
71	José Pérez Francés	Spain	Ferrys	2	+ 7' 14	
72	Vicente Iturat	Spain	Ferrys	40	+ 1h 22' 57	
73	Antonio Bertrán	Spain	Ferrys	24	+ 46' 48	
74	Julio San Emeterio	Spain	Ferrys	DNF	—	
75	Emilio Cruz	Spain	Ferrys	28	+ 49' 10	
76	Gabriel Company	Spain	Ferrys	45	+ 1h 35' 47	
77	Juan Manuel Menéndez Gómez	Spain	Ferrys	DNF	—	
78	Ventura Díaz	Spain	Ferrys	DNF	—	
79	Juan Escola	Spain	Ferrys	DNF	—	
80	Rogelio Hernández Santibáñez	Spain	Ferrys	39	+ 1h 21' 40	
81	Antonio Jiménez Quiles	Spain	Licor 43	27	+ 48' 56	
82	Jesús Loroño	Spain	Licor 43	13	+ 32' 49	
83	Fernando Manzaneque	Spain	Licor 43	8	+ 18' 13	
84	René Marigil	Spain	Licor 43	16	+ 37' 47	
85	Ángel Guardiola Ortiz	Spain	Licor 43	44	+ 1h 30' 05	
86	Luis Peñalver Escribano	Spain	Licor 43	DNF	—	
87	Raúl Rey Fomosel	Spain	Licor 43	DNF	—	
88	Vicente Luque Serrano	Spain	Licor 43	DNF	—	
89	Esteban Martín Jiménez	Spain	Licor 43	43	+ 1h 27' 45	
90	Ángel Rodríguez López	Spain	Licor 43	DNF	—	
