= 1962 Vuelta a España, Stage 10 to Stage 17 =

Cycling race stages

The 1962 Vuelta a España was the 17th edition of the Vuelta a España, one of cycling's Grand Tours. The Vuelta began in Barcelona on 27 April, and Stage 10 occurred on 6 May with a stage from Valdepeñas. The race finished in Bilbao on 13 May.

== Stage 10 ==
6 May 1962 - Valdepeñas to Madrid, 210 km (130.5 mi)

Route:

Stage 10 result

Rank	Rider	Team	Time
1	Albertus Geldermans (NED)	Saint-Raphaël–Helyett–Hutchinson	5h 10' 28"
2	André Messelis (BEL)	Wiel's–Groene Leeuw	+ 59"
3	Marcel Janssens (BEL)	Saint-Raphaël–Helyett–Hutchinson	+ 1' 29"
4	Giuseppe Sartore (ITA)	Italy	s.t.
5	Jean Stablinski (FRA)	Saint-Raphaël–Helyett–Hutchinson	s.t.
6	Raúl Rey Fomosel (ESP)	Licor 43	s.t.
7	Rogelio Hernández Santibáñez (ESP)	Ferrys	s.t.
8	José Martín Colmenarejo (ESP)	Faema	s.t.
9	Frits Knoops (NED)	Netherlands	s.t.
10	Vicente Iturat (ESP)	Ferrys	+ 2' 29"

General classification after Stage 10

Rank	Rider	Team	Time
1	Seamus Elliott (IRL)	Saint-Raphaël–Helyett–Hutchinson	43h 39' 36"
2	Rudi Altig (FRG)	Saint-Raphaël–Helyett–Hutchinson	+ 22"
3	Michel Stolker (NED)	Saint-Raphaël–Helyett–Hutchinson	+ 2' 02"
4	Jean Stablinski (FRA)	Saint-Raphaël–Helyett–Hutchinson	+ 2' 54"
5	Jacques Anquetil (FRA)	Saint-Raphaël–Helyett–Hutchinson	+ 4' 43"
6	José Martín Colmenarejo (ESP)	Faema	+ 4' 50"
7	José Pérez Francés (ESP)	Ferrys	+ 5' 32"
8	Francisco Gabica (ESP)	Kas	+ 5' 40"
9	Miguel Pacheco Font (ESP)	Kas	s.t.
10	José Herrero Berrendero (ESP)	Faema	+ 6' 00"

== Stage 11 ==
7 May 1962 - Madrid to Valladolid, 189 km (117.4 mi)

Route:

Stage 11 result

Rank	Rider	Team	Time
1	Jean Stablinski (FRA)	Saint-Raphaël–Helyett–Hutchinson	4h 53' 51"
2	Jean Graczyk (FRA)	Saint-Raphaël–Helyett–Hutchinson	+ 30"
3	José Pérez Francés (ESP)	Ferrys	+ 1' 00"
4	Rudi Altig (FRG)	Saint-Raphaël–Helyett–Hutchinson	s.t.
5	Marcel Seynaeve (BEL)	Wiel's–Groene Leeuw	s.t.
6	Francisco Gabica (ESP)	Kas	s.t.
7	Eddy Pauwels (BEL)	Wiel's–Groene Leeuw	s.t.
8	Roger Baguet (BEL)	Wiel's–Groene Leeuw	s.t.
9	Seamus Elliott (IRL)	Saint-Raphaël–Helyett–Hutchinson	s.t.
10	Jan Westdorp (NED)	Netherlands	s.t.

== Stage 12 ==
8 May 1962 - Valladolid to Logroño, 22 km (13.7 mi)

Stage 12 result

Rank	Rider	Team	Time
1	Ernesto Bono (ITA)	Italy	6h 15' 50"
2	René Van Meenen (BEL)	Wiel's–Groene Leeuw	+ 30"
3	Jan Westdorp (NED)	Netherlands	+ 2' 00"
4	Manuel Martin Pinera (ESP)	Kas	s.t.
5	Rudi Altig (FRG)	Saint-Raphaël–Helyett–Hutchinson	+ 3' 23"
6	José Segú (ESP)	Kas	s.t.
7	Roger Baguet (BEL)	Wiel's–Groene Leeuw	s.t.
8	José Pérez Francés (ESP)	Ferrys	s.t.
9	Marcel Seynaeve (BEL)	Wiel's–Groene Leeuw	s.t.
10	Antonio Barrutia (ESP)	Kas	s.t.

General classification after Stage 12

Rank	Rider	Team	Time
1	Seamus Elliott (IRL)	Saint-Raphaël–Helyett–Hutchinson	54h 53' 40"
2	Rudi Altig (FRG)	Saint-Raphaël–Helyett–Hutchinson	+ 22"
3	Jean Stablinski (FRA)	Saint-Raphaël–Helyett–Hutchinson	+ 2' 01"
4	Michel Stolker (NED)	Saint-Raphaël–Helyett–Hutchinson	+ 2' 02"
5	Jacques Anquetil (FRA)	Saint-Raphaël–Helyett–Hutchinson	+ 4' 43"
6	José Martín Colmenarejo (ESP)	Faema	+ 4' 50"
7	José Pérez Francés (ESP)	Ferrys	+ 5' 32"
8	Francisco Gabica (ESP)	Kas	+ 5' 40"
9	Miguel Pacheco Font (ESP)	Kas	s.t.
10	José Herrero Berrendero (ESP)	Faema	+ 12' 51"

== Stage 13 ==
9 May 1962 - Logroño to Pamplona, 191 km (119 mi) (team time trial)

Route:

Stage 13 result

Rank	Rider	Team	Time
1	Jean Graczyk (FRA)	Saint-Raphaël–Helyett–Hutchinson	5h 44' 14"
2	Jean-Claude Annaert (FRA)	Saint-Raphaël–Helyett–Hutchinson	+ 47"
3	Vicente Iturat (ESP)	Ferrys	+ 1' 17"
4	Albertus Geldermans (NED)	Saint-Raphaël–Helyett–Hutchinson	s.t.
5	Jan Westdorp (NED)	Netherlands	s.t.
6	Antonio Bertrán (ESP)	Ferrys	s.t.
7	Eddy Pauwels (BEL)	Wiel's–Groene Leeuw	+ 1' 18"
8	Eusebio Vélez (ESP)	Kas	s.t.
9	José Pérez Francés (ESP)	Ferrys	+ 3' 17"
10	Roger Baguet (BEL)	Wiel's–Groene Leeuw	s.t.

General classification after Stage 13

Rank	Rider	Team	Time
1	Seamus Elliott (IRL)	Saint-Raphaël–Helyett–Hutchinson	60h 41' 11"
2	Rudi Altig (FRG)	Saint-Raphaël–Helyett–Hutchinson	+ 22"
3	Jean Stablinski (FRA)	Saint-Raphaël–Helyett–Hutchinson	+ 2' 01"
4	Michel Stolker (NED)	Saint-Raphaël–Helyett–Hutchinson	+ 2' 02"
5	Jacques Anquetil (FRA)	Saint-Raphaël–Helyett–Hutchinson	+ 4' 43"
6	José Martín Colmenarejo (ESP)	Faema	+ 4' 50"
7	José Pérez Francés (ESP)	Ferrys	+ 5' 32"
8	Francisco Gabica (ESP)	Kas	+ 5' 40"
9	Miguel Pacheco Font (ESP)	Kas	s.t.
10	Fernando Manzaneque (ESP)	Licor 43	+ 13' 01"

== Stage 14 ==
10 May 1962 - Pamplona to Bayonne, 149 km (93 mi)

Route:

Stage 14 result

Rank	Rider	Team	Time
1	Jean Graczyk (FRA)	Saint-Raphaël–Helyett–Hutchinson	4h 04' 02"
2	Jean-Claude Annaert (FRA)	Saint-Raphaël–Helyett–Hutchinson	+ 30"
3	Eusebio Vélez (ESP)	Kas	+ 1' 00"
4	Ángel Guardiola Ortiz (ESP)	Licor 43	+ 1' 02"
5	Rudi Altig (FRG)	Saint-Raphaël–Helyett–Hutchinson	+ 2' 26"
6	Vicente Iturat (ESP)	Ferrys	s.t.
7	Marcel Janssens (BEL)	Saint-Raphaël–Helyett–Hutchinson	s.t.
8	José Segú (ESP)	Kas	s.t.
9	Leo Coehorst (NED)	Netherlands	s.t.
10	Marcel Seynaeve (BEL)	Wiel's–Groene Leeuw	s.t.

General classification after Stage 14

Rank	Rider	Team	Time
1	Seamus Elliott (IRL)	Saint-Raphaël–Helyett–Hutchinson	64h 47' 39"
2	Rudi Altig (FRG)	Saint-Raphaël–Helyett–Hutchinson	+ 22"
3	Jean Stablinski (FRA)	Saint-Raphaël–Helyett–Hutchinson	+ 2' 01"
4	Michel Stolker (NED)	Saint-Raphaël–Helyett–Hutchinson	+ 2' 02"
5	Jacques Anquetil (FRA)	Saint-Raphaël–Helyett–Hutchinson	+ 4' 43"
6	José Pérez Francés (ESP)	Ferrys	+ 5' 32"
7	Francisco Gabica (ESP)	Kas	+ 5' 40"
8	Miguel Pacheco Font (ESP)	Kas	s.t.
9	Fernando Manzaneque (ESP)	Licor 43	+ 13' 01"
10	Eddy Pauwels (BEL)	Wiel's–Groene Leeuw	+ 13' 43"

== Stage 15 ==
11 May 1962 - Bayonne to San Sebastián, 82 km (51 mi) (ITT)

Route:

Stage 15 result

Rank	Rider	Team	Time
1	Rudi Altig (FRG)	Saint-Raphaël–Helyett–Hutchinson	2h 16' 07"
2	Jacques Anquetil (FRA)	Saint-Raphaël–Helyett–Hutchinson	+ 31"
3	José Pérez Francés (ESP)	Ferrys	+ 2' 04"
4	Eusebio Vélez (ESP)	Kas	+ 4' 41"
5	Miguel Pacheco Font (ESP)	Kas	+ 5' 13"
6	Albertus Geldermans (NED)	Saint-Raphaël–Helyett–Hutchinson	+ 6' 06"
7	Francisco Gabica (ESP)	Kas	+ 6' 13"
8	Jesús Loroño (ESP)	Licor 43	+ 6' 22"
9	Eddy Pauwels (BEL)	Wiel's–Groene Leeuw	+ 7' 06"
10	Seamus Elliott (IRL)	Saint-Raphaël–Helyett–Hutchinson	+ 7' 39"

General classification after Stage 15

Rank	Rider	Team	Time
1	Rudi Altig (FRG)	Saint-Raphaël–Helyett–Hutchinson	67h 04' 08"
2	Jacques Anquetil (FRA)	Saint-Raphaël–Helyett–Hutchinson	+ 4' 51"
3	José Pérez Francés (ESP)	Ferrys	+ 7' 14"
4	Seamus Elliott (IRL)	Saint-Raphaël–Helyett–Hutchinson	+ 7' 17"
5	Miguel Pacheco Font (ESP)	Kas	+ 10' 01"
6	Francisco Gabica (ESP)	Kas	+ 10' 11"
7	Michel Stolker (NED)	Saint-Raphaël–Helyett–Hutchinson	+ 12' 03"
8	Jean Stablinski (FRA)	Saint-Raphaël–Helyett–Hutchinson	+ 13' 08"
9	Albertus Geldermans (NED)	Saint-Raphaël–Helyett–Hutchinson	+ 20' 23"
10	Eddy Pauwels (BEL)	Wiel's–Groene Leeuw	+ 20' 27"

== Stage 16 ==
12 May 1962 - San Sebastián to Vitoria, 177 km (110 mi)

Route:

Stage 16 result

Rank	Rider	Team	Time
1	Jean Graczyk (FRA)	Saint-Raphaël–Helyett–Hutchinson	5h 37' 59"
2	Eusebio Vélez (ESP)	Kas	+ 30"
3	Fernando Manzaneque (ESP)	Licor 43	+ 1' 01"
4	Rudi Altig (FRG)	Saint-Raphaël–Helyett–Hutchinson	+ 3' 27"
5	José Segú (ESP)	Kas	s.t.
6	Marcel Seynaeve (BEL)	Wiel's–Groene Leeuw	s.t.
7	Francisco Gabica (ESP)	Kas	s.t.
8	Alfons Sweeck (BEL)	Wiel's–Groene Leeuw	s.t.
9	Juan Jorge Nicolau (ESP)	Kas	s.t.
10	Seamus Elliott (IRL)	Saint-Raphaël–Helyett–Hutchinson	s.t.

General classification after Stage 16

Rank	Rider	Team	Time
1	Rudi Altig (FRG)	Saint-Raphaël–Helyett–Hutchinson	72h 45' 34"
2	Jacques Anquetil (FRA)	Saint-Raphaël–Helyett–Hutchinson	+ 4' 42"
3	José Pérez Francés (ESP)	Ferrys	+ 7' 14"
4	Seamus Elliott (IRL)	Saint-Raphaël–Helyett–Hutchinson	+ 7' 17"
5	Miguel Pacheco Font (ESP)	Kas	+ 10' 21"
6	Francisco Gabica (ESP)	Kas	+ 10' 31"
7	Michel Stolker (NED)	Saint-Raphaël–Helyett–Hutchinson	+ 12' 03"
8	Jean Stablinski (FRA)	Saint-Raphaël–Helyett–Hutchinson	+ 13' 08"
9	Fernando Manzaneque (ESP)	Licor 43	+ 18' 13"
10	Albertus Geldermans (NED)	Saint-Raphaël–Helyett–Hutchinson	+ 20' 23"

== Stage 17 ==
13 May 1962 - Vitoria to Bilbao, 171 km (106 mi)

Route:

Stage 17 result

Rank	Rider	Team	Time
1	José Segú (ESP)	Kas	5h 45' 33"
2	Eusebio Vélez (ESP)	Kas	+ 1' 32"
3	Mario Silva (POR)	Portugal	+ 2' 02"
4	Dieter Puschel (FRG)	Wiel's–Groene Leeuw	s.t.
5	Esteban Martín Jiménez (ESP)	Licor 43	+ 2' 41"
6	Marcel Seynaeve (BEL)	Wiel's–Groene Leeuw	+ 3' 48"
7	Eddy Pauwels (BEL)	Wiel's–Groene Leeuw	s.t.
8	Antonio Barrutia (ESP)	Kas	s.t.
9	Seamus Elliott (IRL)	Saint-Raphaël–Helyett–Hutchinson	+ 4' 20"
10	José Pérez Francés (ESP)	Ferrys	s.t.

General classification after Stage 17

Rank	Rider	Team	Time
1	Rudi Altig (FRG)	Saint-Raphaël–Helyett–Hutchinson	78h 35' 27"
2	José Pérez Francés (ESP)	Ferrys	+ 7' 14"
3	Seamus Elliott (IRL)	Saint-Raphaël–Helyett–Hutchinson	+ 7' 17"
4	Miguel Pacheco Font (ESP)	Kas	+ 10' 21"
5	Francisco Gabica (ESP)	Kas	+ 10' 31"
6	Jean Stablinski (FRA)	Saint-Raphaël–Helyett–Hutchinson	+ 17' 07"
7	Michel Stolker (NED)	Saint-Raphaël–Helyett–Hutchinson	+ 17' 57"
8	Fernando Manzaneque (ESP)	Licor 43	+ 18' 13"
9	Eddy Pauwels (BEL)	Wiel's–Groene Leeuw	+ 19' 55"
10	Albertus Geldermans (NED)	Saint-Raphaël–Helyett–Hutchinson	+ 20' 23"
