= 1962 Vuelta a España, Stage 1 to Stage 9 =

Cycling race stages

The 1962 Vuelta a España was the 17th edition of the Vuelta a España, one of cycling's Grand Tours. The Vuelta began in Barcelona on 27 April, and Stage 9 occurred on 5 May with a stage to Córdoba. The race finished in Bilbao on 13 May.

== Stage 1 ==
27 April 1962 - Barcelona to Barcelona, 90 km (55.9 mi)

Route:

Stage 1 result and general classification after Stage 1

Rank	Rider	Team	Time
1	Antonio Barrutia (ESP)	Kas	2h 13' 40"
2	Seamus Elliott (IRL)	Saint-Raphaël–Helyett–Hutchinson	+ 30"
3	Jean Graczyk (FRA)	Saint-Raphaël–Helyett–Hutchinson	+ 1' 06"
4	Nino Defilippis (ITA)	Italy	s.t.
5	Marcel Janssens (BEL)	Saint-Raphaël–Helyett–Hutchinson	s.t.
6	Antonio Bertrán (ESP)	Ferrys	s.t.
7	José Bernárdez (ESP)	Faema	s.t.
8	Salvador Botella (ESP)	Faema	s.t.
9	José Martín Colmenarejo (ESP)	Faema	s.t.
10	Antonio Gomez del Moral (ESP)	Faema	s.t.

== Stage 2 ==
28 April 1962 - Barcelona to Tortosa, 185 km (115.0 mi)

Route:

Stage 2 result

Rank	Rider	Team	Time
1	Rudi Altig (FRG)	Saint-Raphaël–Helyett–Hutchinson	4h 52' 23"
2	Vicente Iturat (ESP)	Ferrys	+ 30"
3	José Pérez Francés (ESP)	Ferrys	+ 1' 00"
4	Jacques Anquetil (FRA)	Saint-Raphaël–Helyett–Hutchinson	s.t.
5	Francisco Gabica (ESP)	Kas	s.t.
6	José Martín Colmenarejo (ESP)	Faema	s.t.
7	Seamus Elliott (IRL)	Saint-Raphaël–Helyett–Hutchinson	s.t.
8	Miguel Pacheco Font (ESP)	Kas	s.t.
9	Michel Stolker (NED)	Saint-Raphaël–Helyett–Hutchinson	s.t.
10	Jean Stablinski (FRA)	Saint-Raphaël–Helyett–Hutchinson	s.t.

General classification after Stage 2

Rank	Rider	Team	Time
1	Rudi Altig (FRG)	Saint-Raphaël–Helyett–Hutchinson	7h 07' 09"
2	Seamus Elliott (IRL)	Saint-Raphaël–Helyett–Hutchinson	+ 24"
3	Vicente Iturat (ESP)	Ferrys	+ 30"
4	José Pérez Francés (ESP)	Ferrys	+ 1' 00"
5	Jacques Anquetil (FRA)	Saint-Raphaël–Helyett–Hutchinson	s.t.
6	Francisco Gabica (ESP)	Kas	s.t.
7	José Martín Colmenarejo (ESP)	Faema	s.t.
8	Miguel Pacheco Font (ESP)	Kas	s.t.
9	Michel Stolker (NED)	Saint-Raphaël–Helyett–Hutchinson	+ 1' 10"
10	Jean Stablinski (FRA)	Saint-Raphaël–Helyett–Hutchinson	s.t.

== Stage 3 ==
29 April 1962 - Tortosa to Valencia, 188 km (117 mi)

Route:

Stage 3 result

Rank	Rider	Team	Time
1	Nino Defilippis (ITA)	Italy	4h 50' 53"
2	Eddy Pauwels (BEL)	Wiel's–Groene Leeuw	+ 30"
3	Jean Stablinski (FRA)	Saint-Raphaël–Helyett–Hutchinson	+ 1' 00"
4	Antonio Barrutia (ESP)	Kas	s.t.
5	Salvador Rosa Gómez (ESP)	Faema	s.t.
6	Daniel Denys (BEL)	Wiel's–Groene Leeuw	+ 1' 17"
7	Frits Knoops (NED)	Netherlands	s.t.
8	Julien Gekiere (BEL)	Wiel's–Groene Leeuw	s.t.
9	Catulo Ciacci (ITA)	Italy	+ 1' 22"
10	Salvador Botella (ESP)	Faema	s.t.

General classification after Stage 3

Rank	Rider	Team	Time
1	Rudi Altig (FRG)	Saint-Raphaël–Helyett–Hutchinson	11h 59' 24"
2	Seamus Elliott (IRL)	Saint-Raphaël–Helyett–Hutchinson	+ 24"
3	Vicente Iturat (ESP)	Ferrys	+ 30"
4	Jean Stablinski (FRA)	Saint-Raphaël–Helyett–Hutchinson	+ 48"
5	José Pérez Francés (ESP)	Ferrys	+ 1' 00"
6	Jacques Anquetil (FRA)	Saint-Raphaël–Helyett–Hutchinson	s.t.
7	Francisco Gabica (ESP)	Kas	s.t.
8	José Martín Colmenarejo (ESP)	Faema	s.t.
9	Miguel Pacheco Font (ESP)	Kas	s.t.
10	Michel Stolker (NED)	Saint-Raphaël–Helyett–Hutchinson	+ 1' 10"

== Stage 4 ==
30 April 1962 - Valencia to Benidorm, 141 km (88 mi)

Stage 4 result

Rank	Rider	Team	Time
1	Seamus Elliott (IRL)	Saint-Raphaël–Helyett–Hutchinson	3h 14' 06"
2	Manuel Martin Pinera (ESP)	Kas	+ 29"
3	Nino Defilippis (ITA)	Italy	+ 3' 16"
4	Rudi Altig (FRG)	Saint-Raphaël–Helyett–Hutchinson	s.t.
5	Catulo Ciacci (ITA)	Italy	s.t.
6	José Pérez Francés (ESP)	Ferrys	s.t.
7	José Segú (ESP)	Kas	s.t.
8	Julien Gekiere (BEL)	Wiel's–Groene Leeuw	s.t.
9	Marcel Bostoen (BEL)	Wiel's–Groene Leeuw	s.t.
10	Vicente Luque Serrano (ESP)	Licor 43	s.t.

== Stage 5 ==
1 May 1962 - Benidorm to Benidorm, 21 km (13 mi) (TTT)

Stage 5 result

Rank	Team	Time
1	Saint-Raphaël–Helyett–Hutchinson	1h 17' 45"
2	Ferrys	+ 2' 27"
3	Kas	+ 2' 51"
4	Wiel's–Groene Leeuw	+ 3' 03"
5	Faema	+ 3' 21"
6	Licor 43	+ 4' 56"
7	Italy	+ 5' 24"
8	Netherlands	+ 7' 03"
9	Portugal	+ 7' 36"

General classification after Stage 5

Rank	Rider	Team	Time
1	Seamus Elliott (IRL)	Saint-Raphaël–Helyett–Hutchinson	15h 39' 49"
2	Rudi Altig (FRG)	Saint-Raphaël–Helyett–Hutchinson	+ 2' 52"
3	Jean Stablinski (FRA)	Saint-Raphaël–Helyett–Hutchinson	+ 3' 40"
4	Jacques Anquetil (FRA)	Saint-Raphaël–Helyett–Hutchinson	+ 3' 52"
5	Michel Stolker (NED)	Saint-Raphaël–Helyett–Hutchinson	+ 4' 02"
6	Vicente Iturat (ESP)	Ferrys	+ 4' 11"
7	Jean-Claude Annaert (FRA)	Saint-Raphaël–Helyett–Hutchinson	s.t.
8	José Pérez Francés (ESP)	Ferrys	+ 4' 41"
9	Francisco Gabica (ESP)	Kas	+ 4' 50"
10	Miguel Pacheco Font (ESP)	Kas	s.t.

== Stage 6 ==
2 May 1962 - Benidorm to Cartagena, 152 km (94 mi)

Route:

Stage 6 result

Rank	Rider	Team	Time
1	Jean Graczyk (FRA)	Saint-Raphaël–Helyett–Hutchinson	4h 02' 33"
2	Nino Defilippis (ITA)	Italy	+ 30"
3	Jean Stablinski (FRA)	Saint-Raphaël–Helyett–Hutchinson	+ 1' 00"
4	Antonio Bertrán (ESP)	Ferrys	s.t.
5	Catulo Ciacci (ITA)	Italy	s.t.
6	Marcel Bostoen (BEL)	Wiel's–Groene Leeuw	s.t.
7	Antoon van der Steen (NED)	Netherlands	s.t.
8	Frits Knoops (NED)	Netherlands	s.t.
9	Julien Gekiere (BEL)	Wiel's–Groene Leeuw	+ 1' 37"
10	José Segú (ESP)	Kas	s.t.

General classification after Stage 6

Rank	Rider	Team	Time
1	Seamus Elliott (IRL)	Saint-Raphaël–Helyett–Hutchinson	19h 43' 59"
2	Rudi Altig (FRG)	Saint-Raphaël–Helyett–Hutchinson	+ 2' 52"
3	Jean Stablinski (FRA)	Saint-Raphaël–Helyett–Hutchinson	+ 3' 03"
4	Jacques Anquetil (FRA)	Saint-Raphaël–Helyett–Hutchinson	+ 3' 52"
5	Michel Stolker (NED)	Saint-Raphaël–Helyett–Hutchinson	+ 4' 02"
6	Vicente Iturat (ESP)	Ferrys	+ 4' 11"
7	Jean-Claude Annaert (FRA)	Saint-Raphaël–Helyett–Hutchinson	s.t.
8	José Pérez Francés (ESP)	Ferrys	+ 4' 41"
9	Francisco Gabica (ESP)	Kas	+ 4' 49"
10	Miguel Pacheco Font (ESP)	Kas	+ 4' 51"

== Stage 7 ==
3 May 1962 - Murcia to Almería, 223 km (139 mi)

Route:

Stage 7 result

Rank	Rider	Team	Time
1	Rudi Altig (FRG)	Saint-Raphaël–Helyett–Hutchinson	6h 37' 20"
2	Salvador Rosa Gómez (ESP)	Faema	+ 30"
3	Ernesto Bono (ITA)	Italy	+ 1' 00"
4	Jean-Claude Annaert (FRA)	Saint-Raphaël–Helyett–Hutchinson	s.t.
5	Pietro Chiodini (ITA)	Italy	s.t.
6	Fernando Manzaneque (ESP)	Licor 43	s.t.
7	Marcel Seynaeve (BEL)	Wiel's–Groene Leeuw	s.t.
8	Gabriel Company (ESP)	Ferrys	s.t.
9	Michel Stolker (NED)	Saint-Raphaël–Helyett–Hutchinson	s.t.
10	Alfons Sweeck (BEL)	Wiel's–Groene Leeuw	s.t.

General classification after Stage 7

Rank	Rider	Team	Time
1	Rudi Altig (FRG)	Saint-Raphaël–Helyett–Hutchinson	26h 24' 11"
2	Seamus Elliott (IRL)	Saint-Raphaël–Helyett–Hutchinson	+ 59"
3	Michel Stolker (NED)	Saint-Raphaël–Helyett–Hutchinson	+ 2' 10"
4	Jean-Claude Annaert (FRA)	Saint-Raphaël–Helyett–Hutchinson	+ 2' 19"
5	Jean Stablinski (FRA)	Saint-Raphaël–Helyett–Hutchinson	+ 4' 02"
6	Jacques Anquetil (FRA)	Saint-Raphaël–Helyett–Hutchinson	+ 4' 51"
7	Vicente Iturat (ESP)	Ferrys	+ 5' 10"
8	José Pérez Francés (ESP)	Ferrys	+ 5' 40"
9	Francisco Gabica (ESP)	Kas	+ 5' 48"
10	Miguel Pacheco Font (ESP)	Kas	s.t.

== Stage 8 ==
4 May 1962 - Almería to Málaga, 220 km (140 mi)

Route:

Stage 8 result

Rank	Rider	Team	Time
1	Jean-Claude Annaert (FRA)	Saint-Raphaël–Helyett–Hutchinson	6h 17' 02"
2	René Marigil (ESP)	Licor 43	+ 31"
3	Rudi Altig (FRG)	Saint-Raphaël–Helyett–Hutchinson	+ 2' 18"
4	Jean Graczyk (FRA)	Saint-Raphaël–Helyett–Hutchinson	s.t.
5	José Segú (ESP)	Kas	s.t.
6	Julien Gekiere (BEL)	Wiel's–Groene Leeuw	s.t.
7	Vicente Iturat (ESP)	Ferrys	s.t.
8	Roger Baguet (BEL)	Wiel's–Groene Leeuw	s.t.
9	Catulo Ciacci (ITA)	Italy	s.t.
10	Seamus Elliott (IRL)	Saint-Raphaël–Helyett–Hutchinson	s.t.

General classification after Stage 8

Rank	Rider	Team	Time
1	Rudi Altig (FRG)	Saint-Raphaël–Helyett–Hutchinson	32h 43' 31"
2	Jean-Claude Annaert (FRA)	Saint-Raphaël–Helyett–Hutchinson	+ 1"
3	Seamus Elliott (IRL)	Saint-Raphaël–Helyett–Hutchinson	+ 59"
4	Michel Stolker (NED)	Saint-Raphaël–Helyett–Hutchinson	+ 2' 10"
5	Jean Stablinski (FRA)	Saint-Raphaël–Helyett–Hutchinson	+ 4' 02"
6	Jacques Anquetil (FRA)	Saint-Raphaël–Helyett–Hutchinson	+ 4' 51"
7	Vicente Iturat (ESP)	Ferrys	+ 5' 09"
8	José Pérez Francés (ESP)	Ferrys	+ 5' 40"
9	Francisco Gabica (ESP)	Kas	+ 5' 48"
10	Miguel Pacheco Font (ESP)	Kas	s.t.

== Stage 9 ==
5 May 1962 - Málaga to Córdoba, 193 km (120 mi)

Route:

Stage 9 result

Rank	Rider	Team	Time
1	Antonio Gomez del Moral (ESP)	Faema	5h 41' 05"
2	Marcel Seynaeve (BEL)	Wiel's–Groene Leeuw	+ 32"
3	Nino Defilippis (ITA)	Italy	+ 1' 03"
4	Seamus Elliott (IRL)	Saint-Raphaël–Helyett–Hutchinson	s.t.
5	Fernando Manzaneque (ESP)	Licor 43	+ 1' 06"
6	José Urrestarazu (ESP)	Kas	+ 1' 08"
7	Antonio Karmany (ESP)	Kas	+ 1' 15"
8	Eusebio Vélez (ESP)	Kas	+ 1' 53"
9	Roger Baguet (BEL)	Wiel's–Groene Leeuw	+ 1' 55"
10	Rudi Altig (FRG)	Saint-Raphaël–Helyett–Hutchinson	s.t.

General classification after Stage 9

Rank	Rider	Team	Time
1	Seamus Elliott (IRL)	Saint-Raphaël–Helyett–Hutchinson	38h 26' 39"
2	Rudi Altig (FRG)	Saint-Raphaël–Helyett–Hutchinson	+ 22"
3	Michel Stolker (NED)	Saint-Raphaël–Helyett–Hutchinson	+ 2' 02"
4	Jean Stablinski (FRA)	Saint-Raphaël–Helyett–Hutchinson	+ 3' 54"
5	Jacques Anquetil (FRA)	Saint-Raphaël–Helyett–Hutchinson	+ 4' 43"
6	José Pérez Francés (ESP)	Ferrys	+ 5' 32"
7	Francisco Gabica (ESP)	Kas	+ 5' 40"
8	Miguel Pacheco Font (ESP)	Kas	s.t.
9	José Martín Colmenarejo (ESP)	Faema	+ 5' 50"
10	José Herrero Berrendero (ESP)	Faema	+ 6' 00"
