= 1960 Liège–Bastogne–Liège =

Race details
- Dates: 8 May 1960
- Stages: 1
- Distance: 248 km (154 mi)
- Winning time: 6h 40' 23"

Results
	Winner	Albertus Geldermans (NED)	(Radium)
	Second	Pierre Everaert (FRA)	(Saint-Raphaël–R. Geminiani–Dunlop)
	Third	Jef Planckaert (BEL)	(Wiel's–Flandria)

The 1960 Liège–Bastogne–Liège was the 46th edition of the Liège–Bastogne–Liège cycle race and was held on 8 May 1960. The race started and finished in Liège. The race was won by Albertus Geldermans of the Radium team.

== General classification ==
Final general classification

Rank	Rider	Team	Time
1	Albertus Geldermans (NED)	Radium	6h 40' 23"
2	Pierre Everaert (FRA)	Saint-Raphaël–R. Geminiani–Dunlop	+ 2' 01"
3	Jef Planckaert (BEL)	Wiel's–Flandria	+ 2' 53"
4	Rik Van Looy (BEL)	Faema	+ 3' 27"
5	Jean Graczyk (FRA)	Helyett–Leroux–Fynsec–Hutchinson	+ 3' 27"
6	Martin Vanderborgh (NED)		+ 3' 27"
7	René Privat (BEL)	Mercier–BP–Hutchinson	+ 3' 27"
8	Henri De Wolf (BEL)		+ 3' 27"
9	Michel Stolker (NED)	Radium	+ 3' 27"
10	Marcel Janssens (BEL)	Dr. Mann–Dossche Sport	+ 3' 27"
