= Saint-Raphaël (cycling team) =

French cycling team (1954–1964)

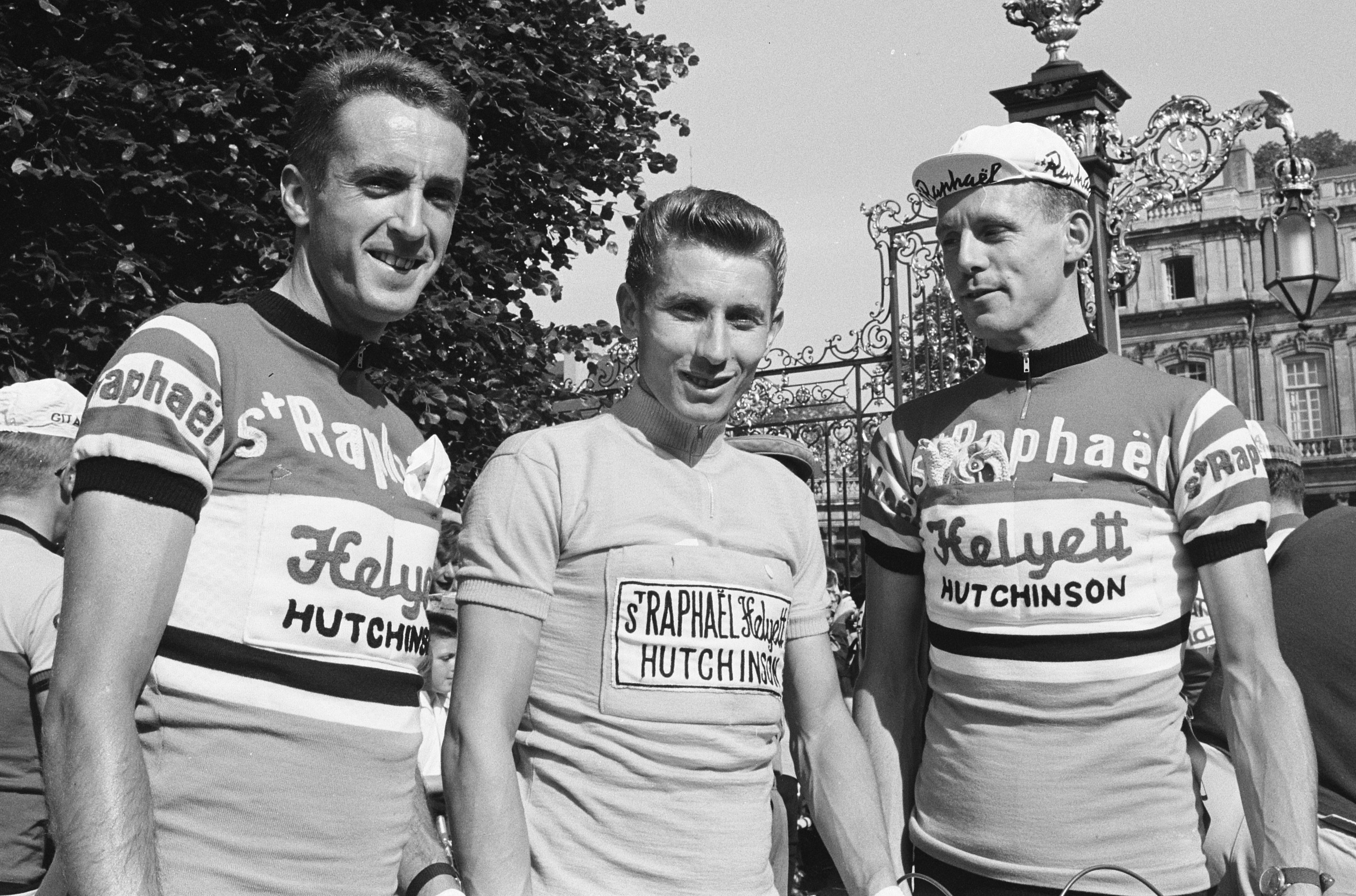
- Saint-Raphaël–Helyett–Hutchinson riders Albertus Geldermans, Jacques Anquetil and Michel Stolker at the 1962 Tour de France

Team information
- Registered: France
- Founded: 1954
- Disbanded: 1964
- Discipline: Road

Team name history
- 1954–1961 1962 1963 1964: Saint-Raphaël–R. Geminiani–Dunlop; Saint-Raphaël–Helyett–Hutchinson; Saint-Raphaël–Gitane–R. Geminiani; Saint-Raphaël–Gitane–Dunlop

Saint-Raphaël was a French professional cycling team that existed from 1954 to 1964. Its main sponsor was French apéritif brand Saint-Raphaël. From 1959 to 1961, a sister team existed, Rapha–Gitane–Dunlop. One of its champion riders was Jacques Anquetil.

== Major results ==
1955
Stage 5 Paris–Nice, Gilbert Bauvin
Montluçon Criterium, Louis Bergaud
Bonnat Criterium, Claude Colette
Tour du Vaucluse, Russell Mockridge
Stages 1 & 2 Vuelta a España, Gilbert Bauvin
Étoile du Léon, Pierre Barbotin
Saint-Pierre-le-Moûtier Criterium, Claude Colette
Circuit des Deux Ponts, Claude Colette
Stage 4 Critérium du Dauphiné, Maurice Lampre
Stage 9 Tour de France, Raphaël Géminiani
Prix du Chasselas: Maurice Bertrand
Issoire Criterium: Louis Bergaud
Overall Lyon–Montluçon–Lyon, Claude Colette

Stage 1, Maurice Lampre

1956
France National Cyclo-cross Championship, Andrè Dufraisse
UCI Cyclo-cross World Championship, Andrè Dufraisse
Genève Cyclo-cross, Andrè Dufraisse
Paris Cyclo-cross, Andrè Dufraisse
Critérium International, Roger Hassenforder
Circuit de Drôme–Ardèche, Ferdinand Devèze
Stage 9 Vuelta a España, Hugo Koblet
Stage 10b (TTT) Vuelta a España, Gilbert Bauvin, Jean Dotto, Roger Walkowiak, Maurice Lampre, Louis Bergaud & Gilbert Bauvin
Stage 13b Vuelta a España, Roger Walkowiak
Overall Tour de Romandie, Pasquale Fornara

Stage 3b, Pasquale Fornara

Bourges, Gilbert Bauvin
Stage 12 Giro d'Italia, Pasquale Fornara
Circuit des Deux Ponts, Louis Caput
Stages 2 & 6 Critérium du Dauphiné, Louis Caput
Stage 7a Critérium du Dauphiné, Pierre Barbotin
Omegna, Pasquale Fornara
Overall Tour de France, Roger Walkowiak

Stages 4b, 9, 14 & 21, Roger Hassenforder

Stage 7 Tour de l'Ouest, Gérard Saint

1957
Stage 1 Vuelta a Andalucía, Miguel Bover
UCI Cyclo-cross World Championship, Andrè Dufraisse
Paris Cyclo-cross, Andrè Dufraisse
Milano–Torino, Miguel Poblet
Stage 3a Vuelta a Levante, Federico Bahamontes
Stage 4 Paris–Nice, Nicolas Barone
Stage 6 Paris–Nice, Albert Platel
Milano–San Remo, Miguel Poblet
GP Martorell, Miguel Bover
Bonnat Criterium, Ferdinand Devèze
Stage 5 Tour de Champagne, Louis Bergaud
Mountains classification Vuelta a España, Federico Bahamontes

Stage 3, Federico Bahamontes
Stage 11, Gilbert Bauvin

Stages 6b, 7 & 8c Roma–Napoli–Roma, Miguel Poblet
Stage 1 Tour de Normandie, Jean Bourlès
Stage 2 Tour de Normandie, Pierre Everaert
Overall Tour de Luxembourg, Gérard Saint

Stage 1, François Mahé
Stage 3, Gérard Saint
Stage 4, Nicolas Barone
Stage 8, Maurice Lampre

Overall Circuit du Cher, Albert Dolhats

Stage 2, Albert Dolhats

Stage 1 Tour du Sud-Est, Raymond Plaza
GP du Midi-Libre, Jean-Pierre Schmitz
Mountains classification Giro d'Italia, Raphaël Géminiani

Stages 3, 9, 10 & 18, Miguel Poblet

Circuit des 4 Cantons, Albert Dolhats
Stage 6 Tour du Sud-Est, Ferdinand Devèze
Overall Tour de l'Ariège, Gérard Saint

Stage 1, Maurice Lampre
Stages 2 & 3, Gérard Saint

Stage 2a Tour de Picardie, Albert Dolhats
Stage 6 Critérium du Dauphiné, Louis Bergaud
Stage 7 Critérium du Dauphiné, Michel Dejouhannet
Boucles de la Seine St Denis, Jacques Dupont
Omegna Criterium, Miguel Poblet
Stage 5a Tour de Suisse, Raphaël Géminiani
Loqueffret Criterium, Jean Bourlès
Stage 2 Circuit des Ardennes, Albert Platel
Stage 3a Tour de France, François Mahé
Stage 5 Tour de France, Gilbert Bauvin
Stage 16 Tour de France, Jean Bourlès
Florenville Criterium, Miguel Poblet
Saint-Just-sur-Loire Criterium, Roger Rivière
Nocturne de la Liberation, Raphaël Géminiani
Aniche Criterium, Pierre Everaert
Plounévez-Lochrist, Jean Bourlès
Montélimar Criterium, Louis Bergaud
Critérium Cycliste International de Quillan, Raphaël Géminiani
Taulé Criterium, Jean Bourlès
Stages 1a & 8 Volta a Catalunya, Miguel Poblet
Watten Criterium, Pierre Everaert
Stage 3 Circuit d'Aquitaine, Jean-Claude Annaert
Eymet Criterium, Albert Dolhats
World hour record, Roger Rivière

1958
France National Cyclo-cross Championship, Andrè Dufraisse
Stage 1 Giro di Sardegna, Raphaël Géminiani
UCI Cyclo-cross World Championship, Andrè Dufraisse
Critérium International, Roger Hassenforder
Paris–Camembert, Nicolas Barone
Overall Tour de l'Aude, Manuel Busto

Stage 2, Michel Dejouhannet
Stage 4, Manuel Busto

Overall Morlaix, Jean-Claude Annaert
Stage 5a Vuelta a España, François Mahé
La Charité-sur-Loire, Michel Dejouhannet
Bourg–Genève–Bourg, Manuel Busto
Overall Tour de Romandie, Gilbert Bauvin

Stage 3b, Gilbert Bauvin

Stage 1 Tour du Sud-Est, Jean-Pierre Schmitz
Nantes Criterium, Albert Dolhats
Stage 5 Tour du Sud-Est, Brian Robinson
Stage 3b GP du Midi-Libre, Roger Hassenforder
Mountains classification Giro d'Italia, Jean Brankart
Belgium National Track Championships, Individual Pursuit, Jean Brankart
Erembodegem–Terjoden, Pierre Machiels
Overall Tour de Luxembourg, Jean-Pierre Schmitz

Stage 1, Jean-Claude Annaert
Stage 2, Jean-Pierre Schmitz

Stage 3 Tour de France, Gilbert Bauvin
GP du Brabant Wallon, Pierre Machiels
Stage 7 Tour de France, Brian Robinson
Circuit du Cher, Pierre Machiels
Stage 13 Tour de France, Louis Bergaud
Zolder Criterium, Pierre Machiels
GP de Fourmies, Pierre Machiels
Hoegaarden Criterium, Jean Brankart
Overall Tour de la Loire, Pierre le Don
Namur Criterium, Jean Brankart
Overall Tour de l'Ouest, Gilbert Scodeller

Stage 2, Pierre Everaert
Stage 5, Roger Hassenforder

Grote Geteprijs, Pierre Machiels
Manche-Océan, Joseph Morvan
Taulé Criterium, Gérard Saint
Stage 3a (TTT) Circuit d'Aquitaine, Raymond Mastrotto, Nicolas Barone & Gérard Thiélin
Stage 4 Circuit d'Aquitaine, Michel Dejouhannet
Montenaken Criterium, Pierre Machiels
Prix du Chasselas, Nicolas Barone
Trieste Criterium, Roger Rivière
Luxembourg National Road Championships, Road Race, Jean-Pierre Schmitz

1959
Maz Cyclo-cross, Andrè Dufraisse
Nantes Cyclo-cross, Andrè Dufraisse
France National Cyclo-cross, Andrè Dufraisse
Saint-Claud Criterium, Roger Rivière
Paris–Camembert, Nicolas Barone
Overall Vuelta a España, Antonio Suárez

Mountains classification, Antonio Suárez
Stage 1a (TTT), Roger Rivière, Pierre le Don, Jean Brankart, Raphaël Géminiani, Pierre Machiels, Roger Chaussabel, Gilbert Bauvin & Brian Robinson
Stage 5, Antonio Suárez
Stage 10 (TTT), Antonio Suárez, Roger Rivière, Pierre le Don, Jean Brankart, Raphaël Géminiani, Pierre Machiels, Roger Chaussabel, Gilbert Bauvin & Brian Robinson
Stages 14 & 16, Roger Rivière

Roubaix–Cassel–Roubaix, Jean-Claude Lefebvre
Argentan Criterium, Roger Rivière
Saint-Macaire-en-Mauges Criterium, Michel Dejouhannet
Overall GP du Midi-Libre, Jean Brankart

Stage 3a, Jean Brankart

Merksem Road Race, Ab Geldermans
Stage 7a Critérium du Dauphiné, Roger Rivière
Stage 4 Tour de Champagne, François Mahé
Belgium National Track Championships Individual Pursuit, Jean Brankart
Spain National Road Championships, Road Race, Antonio Suárez
Stages 6 & 22 Tour de France, Roger Rivière
Stage 7 Tour de France, Roger Hassenforder
Stage 8 Tour de France, Michel Dejouhannet
Stage 20 Tour de France, Brian Robinson
Florenville Criterium, Jean Brankart
Overall Tour de l'Ouest, Joseph Morvan

Stages 4 & 5b, Tom Simpson

Bain-de-Bretagne Criterium, François Mahé
Wielsbeke Road Race, Ab Geldermans
Hamme Criterium, Jean Brankart
Haaltert Criterium, Norbert Coreelman
Charlieu Criterium, Roger Rivière
World hour record, Roger Rivière
Gooik Criterium, Pierre Machiels
Giussano Cyclo-cross, Andrè Dufraisse

1960
Stage 4 Paris–Nice, Michel Dejouhannet
Geldrop Criterium, Bas Maliepaard
Circuit du Cher, Joseph Morvan
Overall Deutschland Tour, Ab Geldermans

Stage 2 Deutschland Tour, Ab Geldermans

Stage 4 Tour de Champagne, Gilbert Scodeller
Liège–Bastogne–Liège, Ab Geldermans
Breda Criterium, Bas Maliepaard
Stage 4 Critérium du Dauphiné, Luis Otaño
Stage 1a Driedaagse van Antwerpen, Luis Otaño
Stage 1b Driedaagse van Antwerpen, Bas Maliepaard, Ab Geldermans & Luis Otaño
Ferrière-la-Grande Criterium, Jean-Claude Annaert
Omloop der Zuid-West-Vlaamse Bergen, Romain Van Wynsberghe
Molenstede Criterium, Bas Maliepaard
GP Raf Jonckheere Criterium, Romain Van Wynsberghe
Bain-de-Bretagne Criterium, Michel Dejouhannet
Netherlands National Road Championships Road Race, Bas Maliepaard
Stage 3 Tour du Nord, Jean-Claude Annaert
Hennebont, Joseph Morvan
Zemst Cyclo-cross, Andrè Dufraisse

1961
Eizer-Overijse Cyclo-cross, Andrè Dufraisse
France National Cyclo-cross, Andrè Dufraisse
Oudergem Cyclo-cross, Andrè Dufraisse
Stage 1 Menton–Roma, Ab Geldermans
Stage 4b Menton–Roma, Ab Geldermans
Paris–Camembert, Jean-Claude Annaert
Stage 2b Roma–Napoli–Roma, Jo de Haan
Stage 10 Vuelta a España, Luis Otaño
Overall Quatre Jours de Dunkerque, Ab Geldermans

Stage 1b (TTT) Jo de Haan & Bas Maliepaard

Stage 4 Tour de l'Aude, Raymond Elena
Helmond Criterium, Jo de Haan
Stage 3 GP du Midi-Libre, Jean-Claude Annaert
Stage 5 Tour de France, Louis Bergaud
Stage 10 Tour de France, Guy Ignolin
Nouan-le-Fuzelier Criterium, Bas Maliepaard
Netherlands National Road Championships Road Race, Bas Maliepaard
Wuustwezel Criterium, Bas Maliepaard

1962
France National Cyclo-cross, Andrè Dufraisse
Stage 1 Paris–Nice, Jean Graczyk
Stage 6 Paris–Nice, Rudi Altig
Stage 3 Tour du Var, Jacques Anquetil
Stages 2 & 3 Deutschland Tour, Rudi Altig
Denderhoutem Criterium, Jo de Roo
Overall Vuelta a España, Rudi Altig

Points classification, Rudi Altig
Stages 2, 7 & 15, Rudi Altig
Stage 4, Seamus Elliott
Stage 5 (TTT), Seamus Elliott, Michel Stolker, Jean-Claude Annaert, Marcel Queheille, Marcel Janssens, Jean Graczyk, Rudi Altig, Jacques Anquetil, Jean Stablinski, Ab Geldermans
Stage 6, 13, 14 & 16, Jean Graczyk
Stage 8, Jean-Claude Annaert
Stage 10, Ab Geldermans
Stage 11, Jean Stablinski

Overall GP du Midi-Libre, Michel Stolker

Stage 1, Michel Stolker
Stage 2b, Jo de Roo

France National Track Championships, Individual Pursuit, Robert Varnajo
Stage 1 Tour de l'Aude, Jo de Roo
Stage 4 Tour de l'Aude, Ab Geldermans
Bordeaux–Paris, Jo de Roo
Labastide-d'Armagnac Criterium, Seamus Elliott
France National Road Championships, Road Race, Jean Stablinski
Manx Premier Trophy, Rudi Altig
Sallanches Criterium, Jean Stablinski

Stage 11 Tour de l'Avenir, René Binggeli

Overall Tour de France, Jacques Anquetil

Points classification, Rudi Altig
Stages 1 3 17, Rudi Altig
Stages 8b & 20, Jacques Anquetil
Stage 14, Jean Stablinski

Netherlands National Road Championships, Road Race, Ab Geldermans
Prix Martini, Seamus Elliott
Montélimar Criterium, Rudi Altig
Drie Zustersteden, Jean Stablinski
UCI World Championship, Road, Profs, Jean Stablinski
Boucles de l'Aulne, Jacques Anquetil
Stage 4 Circuit d'Aquitaine, Marcel Queheille
Paris–Tours, Jo de Roo
Nantes Criterium, Jean Stablinski
Giro di Lombardia, Jo de Roo
Pernod – Super Prestige, Jo de Roo
Trofeo Baracchi, Rudi Altig & Jacques Anquetil
Soings Criterium, Jean Graczyk

1963
Eizer-Overijse, Cyclo-cross, Maurice Gandolfo
France National Cyclo-cross, Andrè Dufraisse
Genova–Nice, Rudi Altig
Stage 2 Vuelta a Levante, Pierre Everaert
Overall Paris–Nice, Jacques Anquetil

Stage 2 & 5, Rudi Altig
Stage 6a, Jacques Anquetil

Overall Critérium International, Jacques Anquetil

Stage 2, Jacques Anquetil

Stage 2 Tour du Var, Jacques Anquetil
Guénin Criterium, Guy Ignolin
Paris–Camembert, Jacques Simon
Overall Tour du Sud-Est, Jean-Claude Lebaube
Paris–Brussel, Jean Stablinski
Overall Vuelta a España, Jacques Anquetil

Points classification, Bas Maliepaard
Stage 1b, Jacques Anquetil
Stage 5, Bas Maliepaard
Stage 6, Guy Ignolin
Stage 10, Jean Stablinski
Stage 13, Seamus Elliott
Stage 15, Guy Ignolin

Stage 4b GP du Midi-Libre, Ab Geldermans
Labastide-d'Armagnac Criterium, Rudi Altig
Montmorillon Criterium, Fernand Delort
Overall Critérium du Dauphiné, Jacques Anquetil

Stage 1, Pierre Everaert
Stage 4, Jean Stablinski
Stage 6a, Jacques Anquetil

France National Track Championships, Individual Pursuit, Robert Varnajo
France National Road Championships, Road Race, Jean Stablinski
Overall Tour de France, Jacques Anquetil

Stage 3, Seamus Elliott
Stages 6b, 10, 17 & 19, Jacques Anquetil
Stage 11 & 14, Guy Ignolin

Chaumont Criterium, Jean Stablinski
Oradour-sur-Glane Criterium, Jacques Anquetil
Overall Paris–Luxembourg, Rudi Altig

Stage 1, Rudi Altig

Château-Chinon Criterium, Jacques Anquetil
Bain-de-Bretagne Criterium, Guy Ignolin
Mijl van Mares, Bas Maliepaard
Circuit d'Auvergne, Jacques Anquetil
Critérium cycliste international de Quillan, Jacques Anquetil
Bussières Criterium, Jacques Anquetil
Manche-Océan, Ab Geldermans
Vayrac Criterium, Seamus Elliott
Paris–Tours, Jo de Roo
Giro di Lombardia, Jo de Roo
Pernod–Super Prestige, Jacques Anquetil

1964
Mazé Cyclo-cross, Andrè Dufraisse
Overall Vuelta a Andalucía, Rudi Altig

Stages 3 & 4, Rudi Altig
Stage 6, Arie den Hartog
Stage 7, Michel Stolker

Stage 6b Paris–Nice, Anatole Novak
Brugge Road Race, Cees Lute
Stage 8b Paris–Nice, Rudi Altig
Gent–Wevelgem, Jacques Anquetil
Oldenzaal Critérium, Arie den Hartog
Stage 1 Critérium International, Jacques Anquetil
Paris–Camembert, Arie den Hartog
Tour of Flanders, Rudi Altig
GP Union Dortmund, Rudi Altig
Overall Tour du Sud-Est, Jean-Claude Annaert
Stage 2 Tour of Belgium, Rudi Altig
Stage 1 Euskal Bizikleta, Arie den Hartog
GP de Vougy, Robert Ducard
Circuit d'Auvergne, Louis Rostollan
Stage 8 Vuelta a España, Michel Stolker
Stage 4 Quatre Jours de Dunkerque, Bas Maliepaard
Stage 4b GP du Midi-Libre, Jo de Roo
Stage 1 Critérium du Dauphiné, Jean-Claude Lebaube
Overall Giro d'Italia, Jacques Anquetil

Stage 5, Jacques Anquetil
Stage 19, Cees Lute
Stage 22, Willi Altig

France National Track Championships, Individual Pursuit, Robert Varnajo
Overall Tour de Luxembourg, Arie den Hartog

Stage 2a, Cees Lute, Bas Maliepaard & Arie den Hartog
Stage 3, Arie den Hartog

Manx Premier Trophy, Seamus Elliott
Overall Tour de France, Jacques Anquetil

Stage 4, Rudi Altig
Stage 9, 10b, 17 & 22b, Jacques Anquetil
Stage 12, Jo de Roo
Stage 21, Jean Stablinski

Bain-de-Bretagne Critérium, Jacques Anquetil
Grote Kermiskoers, Cees Lute
Netherlands National Road Championships, Road Race, Jo de Roo
Overall Circuit du Morbihan, Seamus Elliott
GP de Belgique, Arie den Hartog
Germany National Road Championships, Road Race, Rudi Altig
France National Road Championships, Road Race, Jean Stablinski
Castillon-la-Bataille, Criterium, Jacques Anquetil
Manche-Océan, Jean-Claude Lebaube
GP Plouay, Jean Bourlès
Zuidland Criterium, Arie den Hartog
Germany National Track Championships, Madison, Rudi Altig
GP du Parisien, Arie den Hartog, Ab Geldermans & Rudi Altig
Circuit des Frontières, Jean Stablinski
Frankfurt am Main Six Days, Rudi Altig
