= 1964 La Flèche Wallonne =

Race details
- Dates: 4 May 1964
- Stages: 1
- Distance: 215 km (133.6 mi)
- Winning time: 6h 16' 41"

Results
	Winner	Gilbert Desmet (BEL)	(Wiel's–Groene Leeuw)
	Second	Jan Janssen (NED)	(Pelforth–Sauvage–Lejeune)
	Third	Peter Post (NED)	(Flandria–Romeo)

The 1964 La Flèche Wallonne was the 28th edition of La Flèche Wallonne cycle race and was held on 4 May 1964. The race started in Liège and finished in Charleroi. The race was won by Gilbert Desmet of the Wiel's team.

== General classification ==
Final general classification

Rank	Rider	Team	Time
1	Gilbert Desmet (BEL)	Wiel's–Groene Leeuw	6h 16' 41"
2	Jan Janssen (NED)	Pelforth–Sauvage–Lejeune	+ 4"
3	Peter Post (NED)	Flandria–Romeo	+ 4"
4	André Noyelle (BEL)	Dr. Mann–Labo	+ 4"
5	Vito Taccone (ITA)	Salvarani	+ 7"
6	Rudi Altig (FRG)	Saint-Raphaël–Gitane–Dunlop	+ 8"
7	Théo Nys (BEL)		+ 14"
8	Bas Maliepaard (NED)	Saint-Raphaël–Gitane–Dunlop	+ 24"
9	François Mahé (FRA)	Pelforth–Sauvage–Lejeune	+ 24"
10	Hans Junkermann (FRG)	Wiel's–Groene Leeuw	+ 24"
