= 1959 Omloop Het Volk =

Race details
- Dates: 5 April 1959
- Stages: 1
- Distance: 210 km (130 mi)
- Winning time: 5h 15' 34"

Results
	Winner	Seamus Elliott (IRL)
	Second	Fred De Bruyne (BEL)
	Third	Théo Dingens (BEL)

The 1959 Omloop Het Volk was the 15th edition of the Omloop Het Volk cycle race and was held on 5 April 1959. The race started and finished in Ghent. The race was won by Seamus Elliott.

== General classification ==
Final general classification
Rank	Rider	Time
1	Seamus Elliott (IRL)	5h 15' 34"
2	Fred De Bruyne (BEL)	+ 10"
3	Théo Dingens (BEL)	+ 12"
4	Piet van Est (NED)	+ 12"
5	Leon Vandaele (BEL)	+ 17"
6	Martin Van Geneugden (BEL)	+ 17"
7	Maurice Meuleman (BEL)	+ 17"
8	Arthur Decabooter (BEL)	+ 17"
9	Marcel Ryckaert (BEL)	+ 17"
10	Joop Captein (NED)	+ 17"
