= 1962 Vuelta a España =

Race details
- Dates: 27 April – 13 May
- Stages: 17
- Distance: 2,813 km (1,748 mi)
- Winning time: 78h 35' 27"

Results
Jersey awarded to the overall winner	Winner	Rudi Altig (FRG)	(Saint-Raphaël–Helyett)
	Second	José Pérez Francés (ESP)	(Ferrys)
	Third	Seamus Elliott (IRL)	(Saint-Raphaël–Helyett)
Jersey awarded to the points classification winner	Points	Rudi Altig (FRG)	(Saint-Raphaël–Helyett)
	Mountains	Antonio Karmany (ESP)	(KAS)
	Sprints	José Segú (ESP)	(KAS)

The 1962 Vuelta a España was the 17th Vuelta a España, taking place from 27 April to 13 May 1962. It consisted of 17 stages over 2,806 km (1,744 mi), ridden at an average speed of 35.684 km/h (22.173 mph).

Jacques Anquetil started the race with the intention of winning it and becoming the first cyclist to win all the three grand tours. However, injury forced him out of the race. His Saint-Raphaël–Helyett team dominated the race, with the team taking the leaders jersey after the second stage of the race. Rudi Altig and Seamus Elliott both wore the jersey with Altig taking it off the shoulders of Elliott after winning the final individual time trial on the 15th stage. Altig became the first German winner of the event.

== Route ==
List of stages
Stage	Date	Course	Distance	Type	Winner
1	27 April	Barcelona to Barcelona	90 km (56 mi)		Antonio Barrutia (ESP)
2	28 April	Barcelona to Tortosa	185 km (115 mi)		Rudi Altig (FRG)
3	29 April	Tortosa to Valencia	188 km (117 mi)		Nino Defilippis (ITA)
4	30 April	Valencia to Benidorm	141 km (88 mi)		Seamus Elliott (IRL)
5	1 May	Benidorm to Benidorm	21 km (13 mi)	Team time trial	Saint-Raphaël–Helyett
6	2 May	Benidorm to Cartagena	152 km (94 mi)		Jean Graczyk (FRA)
7	3 May	Murcia to Almería	223 km (139 mi)		Rudi Altig (FRG)
8	4 May	Almería to Málaga	220 km (137 mi)		Jean-Claude Annaert (FRA)
9	5 May	Málaga to Córdoba	193 km (120 mi)		Antonio Gómez del Moral (ESP)
10	6 May	Valdepeñas to Madrid	210 km (130 mi)		Albertus Geldermans (NED)
11	7 May	Madrid to Valladolid	189 km (117 mi)		Jean Stablinski (FRA)
12	8 May	Valladolid to Logroño	232 km (144 mi)		Ernesto Bono (ITA)
13	9 May	Logroño to Pamplona	191 km (119 mi)		Jean Graczyk (FRA)
14	10 May	Pamplona to Bayonne (France)	149 km (93 mi)		Jean Graczyk (FRA)
15	11 May	Bayonne (France) to San Sebastián	82 km (51 mi)	Individual time trial	Rudi Altig (FRG)
16	12 May	San Sebastián to Vitoria	177 km (110 mi)		Jean Graczyk (FRA)
17	13 May	Vitoria to Bilbao	171 km (106 mi)		José Segú (ESP)
	Total		2,806 km (1,744 mi)		

== Classification leadership ==
Classification leadership by stage
Stage	Winner	General classification	Points classification	Mountains classification	Team classification	Sprints classification
1	Antonio Barrutia	Antonio Barrutia				
2	Rudi Altig	Rudi Altig				
3	Nino Defilippis	Rudi Altig				
4	Seamus Elliott	Seamus Elliott				
5	Saint-Raphaël–Helyett	Seamus Elliott				
6	Jean Graczyk	Seamus Elliott			Saint-Raphaël–Helyett	
7	Rudi Altig	Rudi Altig			Saint-Raphaël–Helyett	
8	Jean-Claude Annaert	Rudi Altig			Saint-Raphaël–Helyett	
9	Antonio Gómez del Moral	Seamus Elliott			Saint-Raphaël–Helyett	
10	Albertus Geldermans	Seamus Elliott			Saint-Raphaël–Helyett	
11	Jean Stablinski	Seamus Elliott			Saint-Raphaël–Helyett	
12	Ernesto Bono	Seamus Elliott			Saint-Raphaël–Helyett	
13	Jean Graczyk	Seamus Elliott			Saint-Raphaël–Helyett	
14	Jean Graczyk	Seamus Elliott			Saint-Raphaël–Helyett	
15	Rudi Altig	Rudi Altig			Saint-Raphaël–Helyett	
16	Jean Graczyk	Rudi Altig			Saint-Raphaël–Helyett	
17	José Segú	Rudi Altig	Rudi Altig	Antonio Karmany	Saint-Raphaël–Helyett	José Segú
Final		Rudi Altig	Rudi Altig	Antonio Karmany	Saint-Raphaël–Helyett	José Segú

== Results ==
Final general classification
Rank	Rider	Team	Time
1	(West Germany) Rudi Altig	Saint-Raphaël–Helyett	78h 35' 27"
2	(Spain) José Pérez Francés	Ferrys	+ 7' 14"
3	(Republic of Ireland) Seamus Elliott	Saint-Raphaël–Helyett	+ 7' 17"
4	(Spain) Miguel Pacheco Font	Kas	+ 10' 21"
5	(Spain) Francisco Gabica Billa	Kas	+ 10' 21"
6	(France) Jean Stablinski	Saint-Raphaël–Helyett	+ 17' 07"
7	(Netherlands) Michel Stolker	Saint-Raphaël–Helyett	+ 17' 57"
8	(Spain) Fernando Manzaneque	Licor 43	+ 18' 13"
9	(Belgium) Eddy Pauwels	Wiel's–Groene Leeuw	+ 19' 55"
10	(Netherlands) Ab Geldermans	Saint-Raphaël–Helyett	+ 20' 23"
11	(Spain) Eusebio Vélez Mendizábal	Kas	
12	(Belgium) Marcel Seynaeve	Wiel's–Groene Leeuw	
13	(Spain) Jesús Loroño	Licor 43	
14	(France) Jean-Claude Annaert	Saint-Raphaël–Helyett	
15	(Belgium) Roger Baguet	Wiel's–Groene Leeuw	
16	(Spain) René Marigil	Licor 43	
17	(West Germany) Dieter Puschel	Wiel's–Groene Leeuw	
18	(Spain) Antonio Gómez del Moral	Faema	
19	(Spain) Luis Mayoral	Faema	
20	(Spain) Salvador Rosa	Faema	
21	(Spain) Antonio Karmany	Kas	
22	(Spain) José Segú Soriano	Kas	
23	(Portugal) Mario Silva Pereira	Porto	
24	(Spain) Antonio Bertrán Panadés	Ferrys	
25	(France) Jean Graczyk	Saint-Raphaël–Helyett	
