= 1962 UCI Road World Championships – Men's road race =

Men's Individual Road Race
1962 UCI Road World Championships
- Rainbow jersey

Race details
- Dates: 2 September 1962
- Stages: 1
- Distance: 296.2 km (184.1 mi)
- Winning time: 7h 43' 11"

Results
	Winner	Jean Stablinski (FRA)	(France)
	Second	Seamus Elliott (IRL)	(Ireland)
	Third	Jos Hoevenaers (BEL)	(Belgium)

The men's road race at the 1962 UCI Road World Championships was the 29th edition of the event. The race took place on Sunday 2 September 1962 in Salò, Italy. The race was won by Jean Stablinski of France.

== Final classification ==
General classification (1–10)

Rank	Rider	Time
1st place, gold medalist(s)	Jean Stablinski (FRA)	7h 43' 11"
2nd place, silver medalist(s)	Seamus Elliott (IRL)	+ 1' 22"
3rd place, bronze medalist(s)	Jos Hoevenaers (BEL)	+ 1' 44"
4	Rolf Wolfshohl (FRG)	+ 1' 54"
5	Arnaldo Pambianco (ITA)	+ 2' 04"
6	Huub Zilverberg (NED)	+ 2' 10"
7	Sigi Renz (FRG)	+ 2' 13"
8	Henry Anglade (FRA)	+ 2' 24"
9	Horst Oldenburg (FRG)	+ 2' 59"
10	Franco Cribiori (ITA)	+ 3' 08"
