= Rudi Altig =

German cyclist (1937–2016)

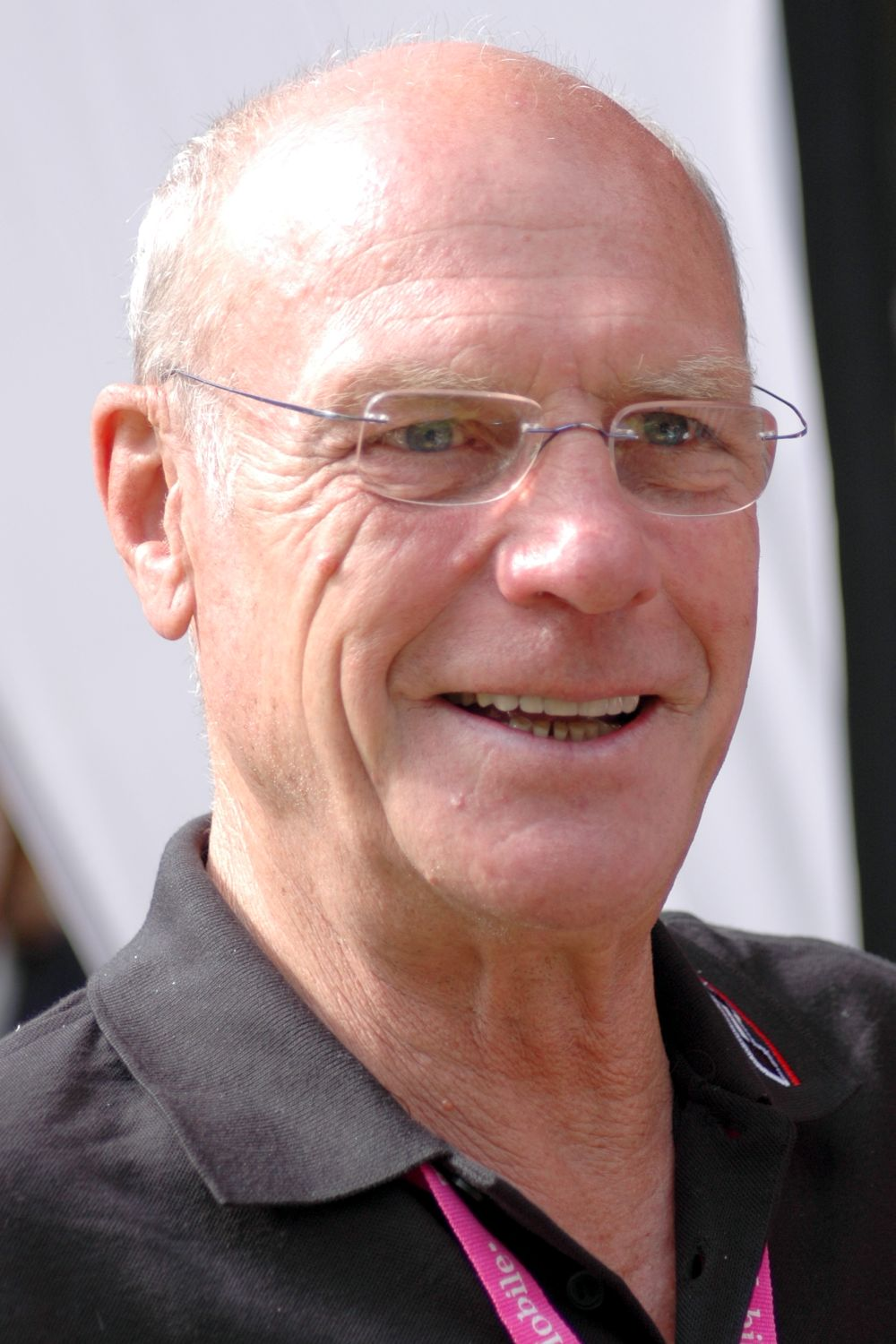
- Altig at the 2006 Deutschland Tour

Personal information
- Full name: Rudi Altig
- Born: 18 March 1937 Mannheim, Germany
- Died: 11 June 2016 (aged 79) Remagen, Germany

Cycling career
- Sport: Cycling
- Disciplines: Road and Track
- Role: Rider
- Rider type: All-rounder

Professional teams
- 1959: Torpedo–Fichtel & Sachs
- 1960–1961: Rapha–Gitane–Dunlop
- 1962–1964: Saint-Raphaël–Helyett–Hutchinson
- 1965: Margnat–Paloma–Inuri–Dunlop
- 1966–1967: Molteni
- 1968–1969: Salvarani
- 1970–1971: G.B.C.–Zimba

Major wins
- Road Grand Tours Tour de France Points classification (1962) 8 individual stages (1962, 1964, 1966, 1969) Giro d'Italia 4 individual stages (1966, 1967) Vuelta a España General classification (1962) Points classification (1962) 6 individual stages (1962, 1965, 1968) 1 TTT stage (1962) One-day races and Classics World Road Race Championships (1966) National Road Race Championships (1964, 1970) Tour of Flanders (1964) Milan–San Remo (1968) Track World Individual Pursuit World Championships (1960, 1961)
Medal record
Representing West Germany
Men's road bicycle racing
UCI Track Cycling World Championships
Gold medal – first place	1960 Leipzig	Individual pursuit
Gold medal – first place	1961 Zurich	Individual pursuit
UCI Road World Championships
Gold medal – first place	1966 Nürburgring	Road race
Silver medal – second place	1965 San Sebastián	Road race

Rudi Altig (German pronunciation: [ˈʁuːdiː ˈaltɪç]; 18 March 1937 – 11 June 2016) was a German professional track and road racing cyclist who won the 1962 Vuelta a España and the world championship in 1966. After his retirement from sports he worked as a television commentator.

== Amateur career ==
Rudi Altig was born in Mannheim, Baden, Germany, an area which had produced good track riders. He began racing in 1952, following his older brother, Willi. The brothers teamed for madison and other two-man races, becoming the best in the country. The British promoter, Jim Wallace, booked Altig to ride with Hans Jaroszewicz at a meeting on Herne Hill velodrome in Good Friday in 1956. He said:

What a pair they made! They just about slaughtered a top-class field of international riders, with all our best home lads. Only Michel Rousseau, later that year to become world sprint champion, was able to take a points sprint from them. That was in the first sprint, too; thereafter the German pair gained not only every sprint for points but every prime [lap prize] as well ... They went on to Coventry [another meeting held over Easter] and did much the same thing, winning everything in which they rode, so classy was their performance.

Altig became national sprint champion in 1957 and 1958. Then Karly Ziegler, a coach, took over his preparation when he joined the Endspurt Mannheim club and Altig became a pursuiter. He won the 1959 national pursuit championship and won the madison championship with his brother. Later that year he beat many of the world's best pursuiters to become world champion in Amsterdam.

== Professional track career ==
Altig was allowed by the Union Cycliste Internationale to turn professional in 1960 within a year of his world championship. He rode his first professional six-day, in Denmark, that winter. Wallace said:

No man ever settled down better or quicker to a pro career than the able Altig. In the hurly-burly world of indoor track racing. Rudi never seemed a novice. Settling down at once, tearing strips off established stars, he soon started to fill indoor tracks which had long forgotten the welcome sight of a 'house full' sign. He brought back the biggest winter racing boom to Germany for many years, reminiscent of the balmy pre-war days. With seven tracks at home - more than in the rest of Europe - Altig had a busy time and was soon in the big money.

He won the world pursuit championship in 1960 and 1961 and won 62 races on the track. He won 22 six-day races, particularly in Germany, including four in Cologne and Dortmund. He never rode the Giro di Lombardia because it clashed with the start of the winter season on the track. He said:

I rode the track because I could win money. If I hadn't been able to win money on the track, I wouldn't have travelled all the velodromes of the world to ride six-days. Now, riders are better paid and they don't need to hammer themselves on the road and the track. We, in our era, we did everything to try to win money. Modern times are different, you have to understand that. You can't compare the two eras. But I don't regret ours.

Altig, who was 1.80 m (5 ft 11 in) tall and weighed 80 kg (180 lb), sprinted on the track on 52 or 53 × 16 and rode pursuits on 52 × 15. "He gave his bikes as hard a time as he gave his adversaries," said the writer, Olivier Dazat.

== Road career ==
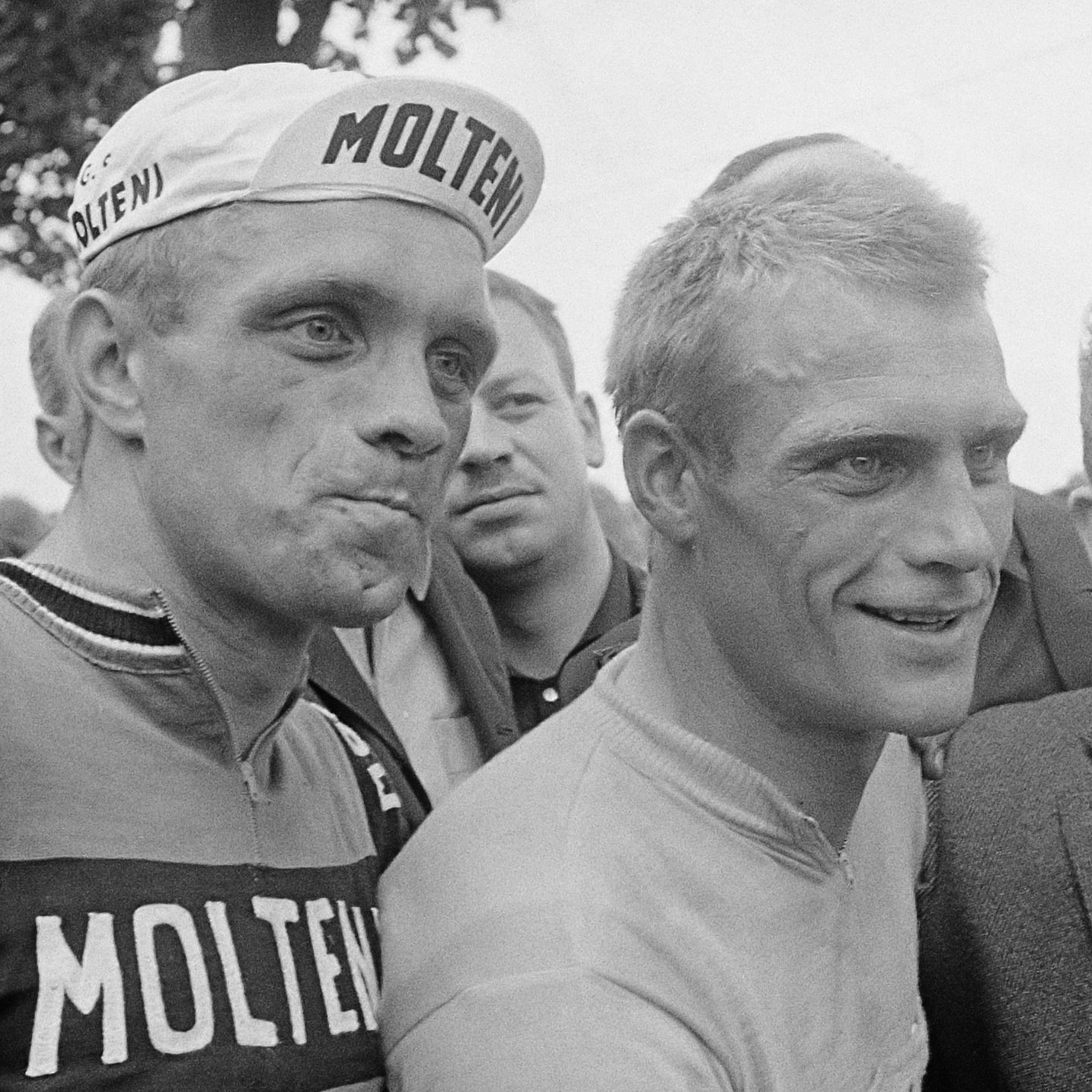
Altig (right) with his brother Willi in 1966

Altig started his professional career as a track rider; it was Raphaël Géminiani who persuaded him his future was on the road. Altig agreed because fame on the road would give him better contracts on the track. He won the Vuelta a España and three of its stages in 1962. He led the general classification for five days in his first Tour de France that same season, winning three stages and the points competition, and finishing 31st.

He won his first classic in 1964, the Tour of Flanders after riding 60 km alone and winning by four minutes. In the same year he won the German National Road Race. In 1965 he finished second to Englishman Tom Simpson in the professional road championship in San Sebastián, Spain. Simpson said:

I could not accept that Altig could beat me. Going round the back of the circuit we came to a gentleman's agreement. Both of us had worked hard in our little break and therefore we each deserved an equal chance of victory. We agreed to separate when we reached the one kilometre to go board and ride in side by side. Altig was quite happy about this for I am sure he thought he could put it across me. So there we were, two gentlemen virtually fighting a duel over the last kilometre. I was glad that Altig had accepted my proposal for it was the fairest way out. I have always regarded him as a great rider and his showing that day did nothing to make me change my mind.

But the world title was not denied for long: he won the 1966 championship not too far away from his home, at the Nürburgring. There was controversy because Altig had been helped by Gianni Motta, riding that day for Italy but normally Altig's companion in the Molteni team. The concern was quickly overshadowed by the refusal of the first three riders to give urine samples for a drugs check. They were protesting at what they saw was the laxity with which tests were carried out and at what they considered restrictions on the way they prepared themselves. Altig said: "We are professionals, not sportsmen." The three were disqualified and suspended but ten days later the Union Cycliste Internationale allowed the result to stand.

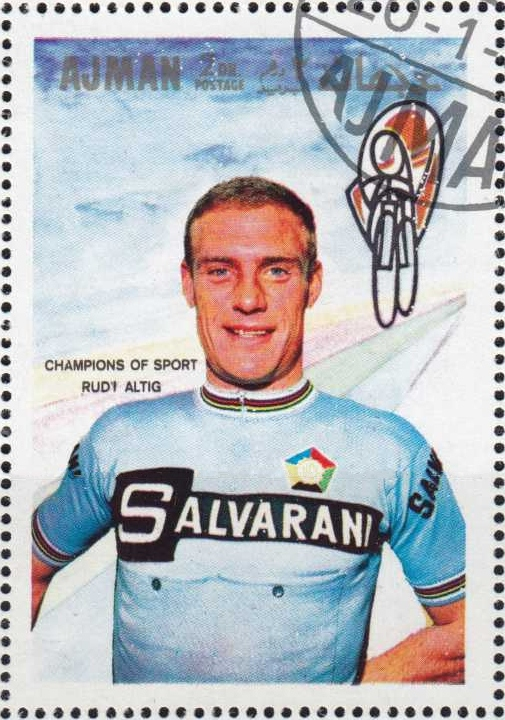
Altig on a 1969 UAE stamp

Altig took three stages in that year's Tour, finishing 12th place overall, and two more in the Giro d'Italia, in which he came 13th.

The second and final classic win came in the 1968 Milan–San Remo. He also took two stages of that year's Vuelta, finishing 18th overall. In 1969 he finished 9th in the Giro, and won the prologue individual time trial of the Tour de France.

=== Jacques Anquetil ===
Altig rode his first Tour as a domestique and as team sprinter for Jacques Anquetil. The two developed a rocky relationship in the Tour of Spain that hardened when Altig took the yellow jersey early in the Tour de France. Anquetil criticised him because his team would have to ride at the front and chase every attack to protect a rider too heavy to keep his lead through the mountains. The two never became close until they rode for different teams.

That same year the two were paired for the Trofeo Baracchi, a 111 km two-man time-trial in Italy. The writer René de Latour wrote:

Generally in a race of the Barrachi type, the changes are very rapid, with stints of no more than 300 yards. Altig was at the front when I started the check - and he was still there a minute later. Something must be wrong. Altig wasn't even swinging aside to invite Anquetil through... Suddenly, on a flat road, Anquetil lost contact and a gap of three lengths appeared between the two partners. There followed one of the most sensational things I have ever seen in any form of cycle racing during my 35 years' association with the sport - something which I consider as great a physical performance as a world hour record or a classic road race win. Altig was riding at 30mph at the front - and had been doing so for 15 minutes. When Anquetil lost contact, he had to ease the pace, wait for his partner to go by, push him powerfully in the back, sprint to the front again after losing 10 yards in the process, and again settle down to a 30mph stint at the front. Altig did not this just once but dozens of times.

Anquetil reached the stadium where the race finished and hit a pole. He was helped away with staring eyes and with blood streaming from a cut to his head. The pairing nevertheless won by nine seconds. Altig said: "Jacques wasn't happy [during the race], it didn't please him at all, but I wanted us to win. So I got him by the saddle, I got him by the shorts, and hop!."

== Retirement ==
Altig became directeur sportif of the Puch-Wolber team when he stopped racing and worked for five years as national coach. He was a television commentator. He said of the American rider, Lance Armstrong: "He is a tyrant who exploits his team-mates without leaving them the least initiative." Of his fellow German, Jan Ullrich, he said he would do better to talk less about what he was going to do and get on and do it.

He died on 11 June 2016 in Remagen, Germany, as a result of cancer.

== Major results ==
=== Road ===
1960
1st Stage 7 Deutschland Tour
1961
4th Genoa–Nice
6th Overall Deutschland Tour
1962
1st Overall Vuelta a España

1st Points classification
1st Stages 2, 5 (TTT), 7 & 15 (ITT)

1st Critérium des As
1st Grand Prix de Cannes
1st Manx Trophy
1st Trofeo Baracchi (with Jacques Anquetil)
Tour de France

1st Points classification
1st Stages 1, 3 & 17
Held after Stages 1 & 3–5

1st Stage 6 Paris–Nice
Deutschland Tour

1st Stages 2 & 3

2nd Road race, National Road Championships
1963
1st Overall Paris–Luxembourg

1st Stage 1

2nd Overall Paris–Nice

1st Stages 2 & 5

2nd Rund um den Henninger Turm
9th Road race, National Road Championships
1964
1st Road race, National Road Championships
1st Overall Vuelta a Andalucía

1st Stages 3 & 4

1st Tour of Flanders
1st GP Union Dortmund
1st Grand Prix du Parisien (TTT)
Tour de France

1st Stage 4
Held after Stages 5–7
Held after Stages 4–6 & 14

1st Stage 8b (ITT) Paris–Nice
2nd Paris–Camembert
2nd Manx Trophy
3rd Gran Premio di Lugano
3rd Trofeo Baracchi (with Tom Simpson)
6th La Flèche Wallonne
6th Rund um den Henninger Turm
8th Overall Tour of Belgium

1st Stage 2

1965
1st Stage 3 Vuelta a España
Circuit du Provençal

1st Stages 1 & 2

2nd Road race, UCI Road World Championships
2nd Overall Paris–Nice

1st Points classification
1st Stages 1, 4 & 6b

2nd Grand Prix des Nations
3rd Critérium des As
4th Genoa–Nice
7th Rund um den Henninger Turm
1966
1st Road race, UCI Road World Championships
1st Giro del Piemonte
1st Giro di Toscana
1st Bol d'Or des Monédières
Tour de France

1st Stages 1, 12 & 22b (ITT)
Held after Stages 1–9
Held after Stage 1

Giro d'Italia

1st Stages 7 & 11
Held after Stages 11–14

3rd La Flèche Wallonne
3rd Genoa–Nice
6th Overall Paris–Nice

1st Stage 3

6th Paris–Roubaix
8th GP Alghero
1967
1st Milano–Vignola
Giro d'Italia

1st Stages 6 & 11

3rd Paris–Roubaix
3rd Giro di Campania
4th Trofeo Baracchi (with Felice Gimondi)
5th Overall Paris–Luxembourg
1968
1st Milan–San Remo
Vuelta a España

1st Stages 3b & 5
Held after Stages 3b–10

2nd Tour of Flanders
2nd Baden-Baden (with Jacques Anquetil)
3rd Overall Tirreno–Adriatico

1st Stage 2

3rd Gran Premio di Lugano
9th Road race, National Road Championships
1969
1st Gran Premio di Lugano
1st Maël-Pestivien
Tour de France

1st Prologue
Held after Prologue & Stage 1a
Held after Prologue

2nd Baden-Baden (with Vittorio Adorni)
9th Overall Giro d'Italia
1970
1st Road race, National Road Championships
1st Rund um den Henninger Turm
1st Sassari-Cagliari
1st Prologue Tour de Suisse
1st Stage 5 Paris–Nice
1st Stage 3 Paris–Luxembourg
2nd Tour des Quatre-Cantons
3rd Overall Vuelta a Mallorca

1st Stage 4

4th Overall Tour de Romandie
4th Mont Faron Hill Climb

=== Grand Tour general classification results timeline ===
Grand Tour	1959	1960	1961	1962	1963	1964	1965	1966	1967	1968	1969	1970	1971
Vuelta a España	—	—	—	1	—	—	DNF	—	—	18	—	—	—
Giro d'Italia	—	—	—	—	—	—	—	13	DNF	DNF	9	44	—
Tour de France	—	—	—	31	—	15	—	12	—	—	DNF	—	—

=== Classics results timeline ===
Monuments results timeline
Monument	1959	1960	1961	1962	1963	1964	1965	1966	1967	1968	1969	1970	1971
Milan–San Remo	—	—	24	—	—	DSQ	29	49	—	1	—	37	—
Tour of Flanders	—	—	—	—	11	1	—	34	71	2	—	—	—
Paris–Roubaix	—	—	32	—	—	11	12	6	3	—	14	—	—
Liège–Bastogne–Liège	—	—	—	—	—	—	—	18	—	—	—	—	—
Giro di Lombardia	Did not contest during career												

=== Major championship results timeline ===
	1959	1960	1961	1962	1963	1964	1965	1966	1967	1968	1969	1970	1971
World Championships	—	—	—	DNF	DNF	18	2	1	14	12	41	15	—
National Championships	—	—	—	2	9	1	13	16	—	9	—	1	—

Legend
—	Did not compete
DNF	Did not finish
DSQ	Disqualified

=== Track ===
1960
1st Individual pursuit, UCI Track World Championships
1961
1st Individual pursuit, UCI Track World Championships

Awards
Preceded by Hans-Joachim Klein	German Sportsman of the Year; 1966	Succeeded by Kurt Bendlin
