= Ferdinand Devèze =

French cyclist

Personal information
- Born: 23 June 1932
- Died: 5 February 1999 (aged 66)

Cycling career
- Sport: Cycling
- Role: Rider

Ferdinand Devèze (23 June 1932 – 5 February 1999) was a French racing cyclist. He rode in the 1957 Tour de France.
