= Luis Mayoral (cyclist) =

Spanish cyclist (born 1937)

Personal information
- Full name: Luis Mayoral Rubin
- Born: 7 February 1937 (age 89) Gijón, Asturias, Spain

Cycling career
- Sport: Cycling
- Discipline: Road
- Role: Rider

Professional teams
- 1957–1960: Peña Solera–D.C. Barcelona
- 1961: C.C. Barcelones - E.M.I.
- 1962–1963: Flandria–Faema–Clément
- 1964–1965: Picadero Jockey Club–Damm

Luis Mayoral Rubin (born 7 February 1937) is a Spanish former professional cyclist. He was professional from 1957 until 1965. He notably rode in the 1962 and 1963 Vuelta a España.

== Biography ==
Luis Mayoral was born in Gijón, Spain on February 7, 1937. He competed with the Faema-Flandria team during 1960s. Luis Mayoral competed in the Trofeo Jaumendreu race in 1962. He retired from cycling in 1965.

== Career ==
His cycling career spanned 8 seasons, from 1957 to 1965, in which he obtained a total of 5 victories. He also competed in the Gran Premio de Catalunya road race in 1963. He took 5th place in vaux gold tankard road race in 1962, which was held in United Kingdom. His best result was 4th in a stage in at the 1961 Volta a Catalunya.
