= Grand Prix du Parisien =

Race details
- Date: September/October
- Region: Paris, France
- Discipline: Road
- Competition: Super Prestige Pernod
- Type: Team time-trial

History
- First edition: 1961
- Editions: 5
- Final edition: 1965
- First winner: Alcyon–Leroux
- Final winner: Pelforth–Sauvage–Lejeune

The Grand Prix du Parisien was an annual road bicycle race held in Paris, France as a team time trial. It was approximately 130 kilometres (81 mi). Each team had six riders. The event was first held in 1961 and for the final time in 1965. From 1963 to 1965 it was part of the Super Prestige Pernod series.

== Winners ==
Year	Winning team	Ranked Riders	Distance	Winning Time
1961	Alcyon–Leroux	André Darrigade, Jean Forestier, Joseph Groussard, Anatole Novak and Gustave Van Vaerenbergh	132 km	2.55'47"4
1962	Flandria–Faema–Clément	Joseph Planckaert, Peter Post, Edgard Sorgeloos, Rik Van Looy, Guillaume Van Tongerloo and Huub Zilverberg	132.1 km	3.00'31"
1963	Peugeot–BP–Englebert	Ferdinand Bracke, François Hamon, Michel Nédélec, Tom Simpson, Claude Valdois and Rolf Wolfshohl	130 km	2.53'53"5
1964	Saint-Raphaël–Gitane–Dunlop	Rudi Altig, Arie den Hartog and Albertus Geldermans	131 km	2.53'18"8
1965	Pelforth–Sauvage–Lejeune	Henry Anglade, Jan Janssen and Willy Monty	125.8 km	2.51'41"
