= Jan Westdorp =

Dutch cyclist (1934–2023)

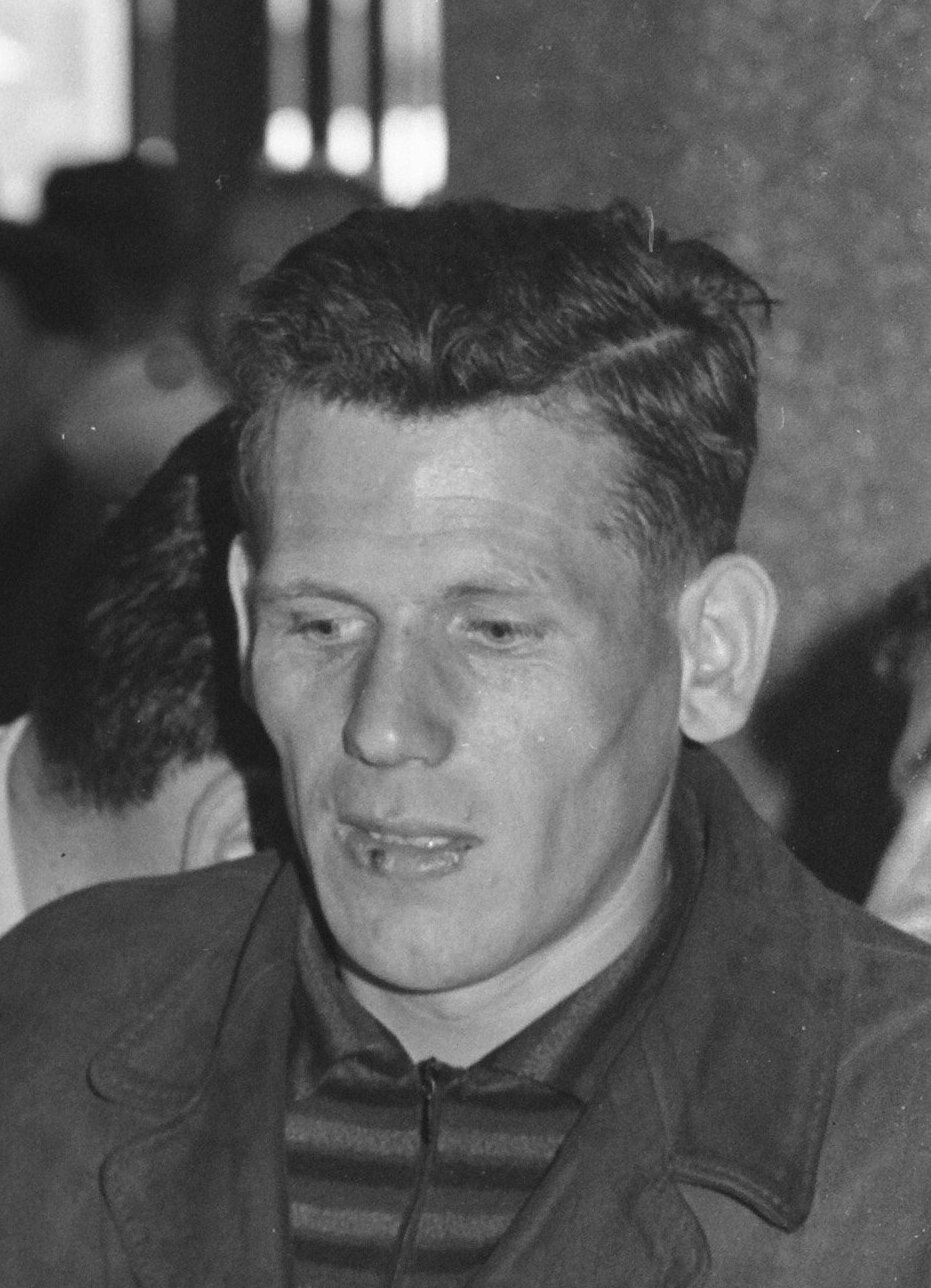
- Westdorp in 1961

Personal information
- Born: 6 September 1934 's-Heerenhoek, Netherlands
- Died: 20 November 2023 (aged 89) IJzendijke, Netherlands

Cycling career
- Sport: Cycling
- Role: Rider

Jan Westdorp (6 September 1934 – 20 November 2023) was a Dutch racing cyclist. He rode in the 1961 Tour de France.

Westdorp died in IJzendijke on 20 November 2023, at the age of 89.
