= Shay Elliott =

Irish cyclist

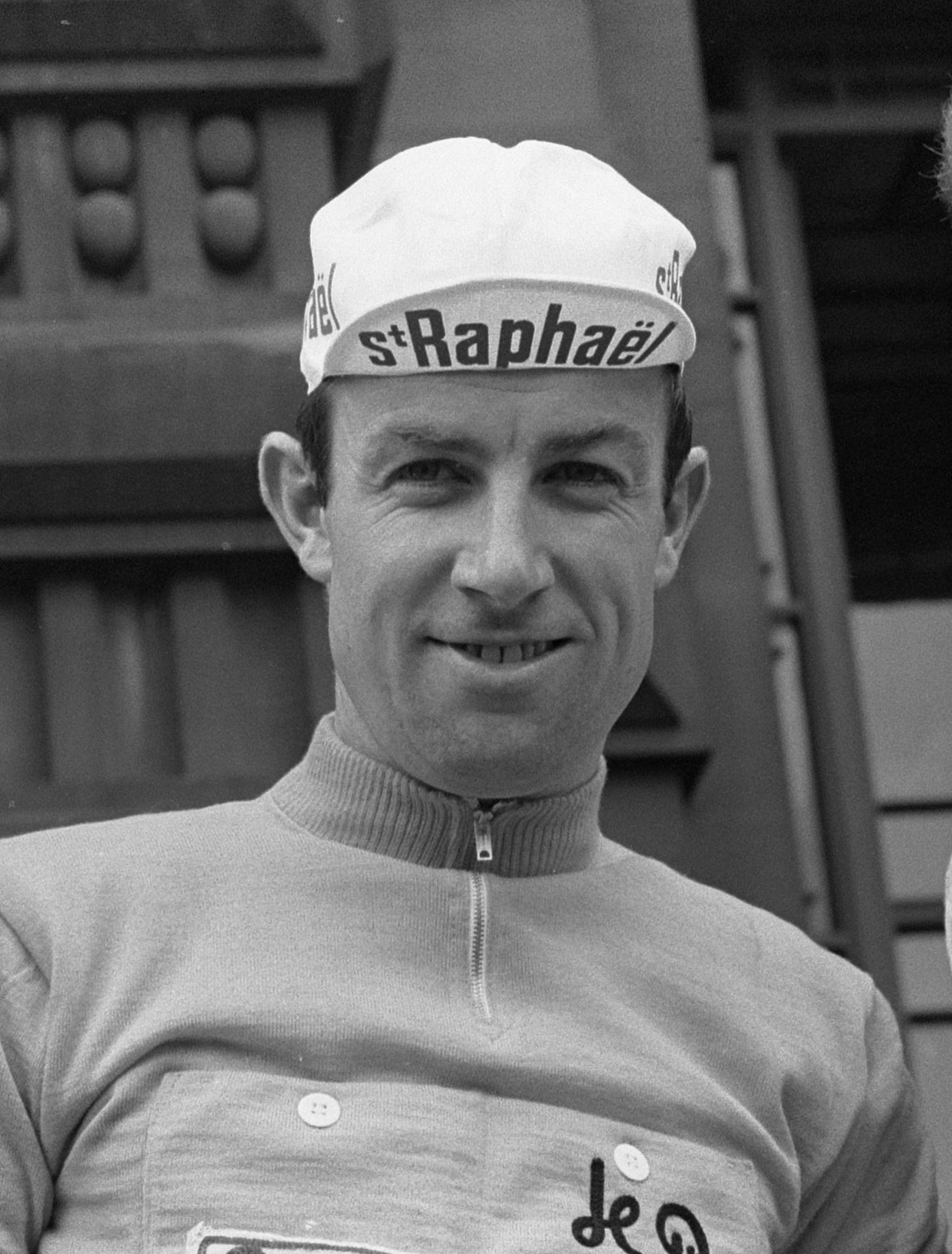
- Seamus Elliott in 1963

Personal information
- Full name: Seamus Elliott
- Nickname: Shay
- Born: 4 June 1934 Dublin, Irish Free State
- Died: 4 May 1971 (aged 36) Dublin, Ireland

Cycling career
- Sport: Cycling
- Discipline: Road
- Role: Rider

Amateur teams
- -1955: Dublin Wheelers
- 1970–: Bray Wheelers

Professional teams
- 1956–1958: Helyett-Potin
- 1959–1961: Helyett-Fynsec
- 1962–1964: Saint Raphael-Geminiani
- 1965: Ford France-Gitane
- 1966–1967: Mercier-BP-Hutchinson
- 1970: Falcon

Major wins
- Grand Tours Tour de France 1 individual stage (1963) Giro d'Italia 1 individual stage (1960) Vuelta a España 2 individual stages (1962, 1963) One-day races and Classics National Road Race Championships (1954, 1955) Omloop Het Volk (1959)
Medal record
Representing Ireland
Men's road bicycle racing
World Championships
Silver medal – second place	1962 Salò	Elite Men's Road Race

Seamus "Shay" Elliott (4 June 1934 – 4 May 1971) was an Irish road bicycle racer, Ireland's first major international rider, with a record comparable only to Sean Kelly and Stephen Roche. He was the first Irish person to ride the Tour de France, first to win a stage, and first to wear the yellow jersey, and first English speaker to win stages in all the Grand Tours.

After a strong amateur period, primarily with the Dublin Wheelers, Elliott was the first Irish cyclist to make a mark as a professional rider in continental Europe. A late-starting but naturally talented rider, he spent most of his pro career riding as a domestique for team leaders such as Jacques Anquetil, and Anquetil's deputy Jean Stablinski. He came 2nd (to Stablinski) in the 1962 World Road Championship at Salò, Italy.

Aside from being the first English-speaker to lead the Tour de France, wearing the yellow jersey for three days, Elliott was first English-speaker to lead the Vuelta a España, in which he came third in 1962 and was the only English-speaker to win the Omloop "Het Volk" semi-classic until 2014 when Ian Stannard won the race. He died in unclear circumstances at the age of 36.

== Early life ==
Elliott was from the working class area of Crumlin in Dublin, the eldest son of James Elliott, a motorbike mechanic, and Ellen, always known as Nell. He played Gaelic football and hurling and didn't learn to ride a bicycle until he was 14. He used it to ride to the town of Naas.

== Amateur career ==
He joined a small cycling club, St Brendan's, attached to St Brendan's Catholic Church, Coolock, when he was 16 and took part in races of about 20 miles that the church organised around the city streets. He came second in his first race, riding a "scrap" bike with a single fixed wheel that led his pedals to bang the road on corners. The winner had a specialised racing bike.

Elliott joined the Southern Road Club when he was 17 and, on a racing bike, won the Grand Prix of Ireland run over 50 km in the Phoenix Park. The club broke up soon afterwards and Elliott joined the Dublin Wheelers, one of the most active clubs at that time, in March 1952. That summer he won the Mannin Veg, a race over one lap of the TT motorcycling circuit on the Isle of Man. He also won the Dublin-Galway-Dublin two-day race, winning the race back to Dublin in a sprint.

In 1953 he rode the Manx International, over three laps of the TT circuit, for the Ireland "B" team. He fell on the tricky turn at Governor's Bridge, shortly before the finish, but came fourth. He won the 1953 Irish amateur road championship.

His King of the Mountains placing in the Tour of Ireland in 1954 earned him a trip to the Simplex training camp in Monte Carlo the following spring.

Jock Wadley said of him in Sporting Cyclist:

I can not remember all the items in Shay's luggage, of course. But I can hardly forget that one whole compartment in the chest of drawers was devoted to provisions which Shay had brought from Ireland, the chief stock being 2lb [1kg] of tea and 2lb of chocolate creams. I was invited to eat as many of the chocolates as I liked, because his aunt who worked in the place where they were made would soon be sending more.

He said that Elliott was one of several riders asked to strip for examination by the soigneur Raymond Le Bert, who normally worked for Louison Bobet. Wadley wrote:

It would be wrong to say that the company laughed when Shay stood there in his underpants, but there were certainly some smiles because in contrast to his lithe, clean-limbed predecessors at the examination, Shay looked a short, fat boy. Le Bert, however, did not smile. Immediately he exclaimed: 'Ah ha, now this is really rock. He is a real flahute. (Flahute is a favourite French way of describing the old-type tough Flemish roadman.)

Elliott did not return permanently to Ireland at the end of the training camp in early 1955. He had just finished six years as an apprentice sheet-metal worker and he and his family in Old County Road in Crumlin, had decided that he had mastered panel-beating and would have a trade to return to if his efforts to become a professional cyclist failed. He contacted a former French professional, Francis Pélissier, for advice. Pélissier told Elliott to compete in as many races as possible, at least three or four a week – possibly in France, but not in Ireland, a cycling backwater. Elliott planned to move to Ghent in Belgium, where he could race several times a week and, as an amateur, win money denied to him in Ireland. At the training camp, however, he met the journalist and race organiser Jean Leulliot, who told him he would burn himself out in round-the-houses racing and urged him to move to Paris.

Leulliot remembered how Elliott had won the Tourmalet stage of the 1954 Route de France, which Leulliot's paper, Route et Piste, organised. Leulliot asked in his paper for someone to accommodate Elliott in the capital and added "The Irishman is soaked with class and has a great future before him." The appeal was answered by Paul Wiegant of the Athletic Club Boulogne-Billancourt (ACBB) in Paris, France's top amateur team. Elliott won five one-day amateur classics in 1955 and set the world 10 km amateur record on the Vélodrome d'Hiver in Paris. He was the first foreigner to be ranked top amateur in France.

Elliott turned professional for the 1956 season.

== Professional career ==
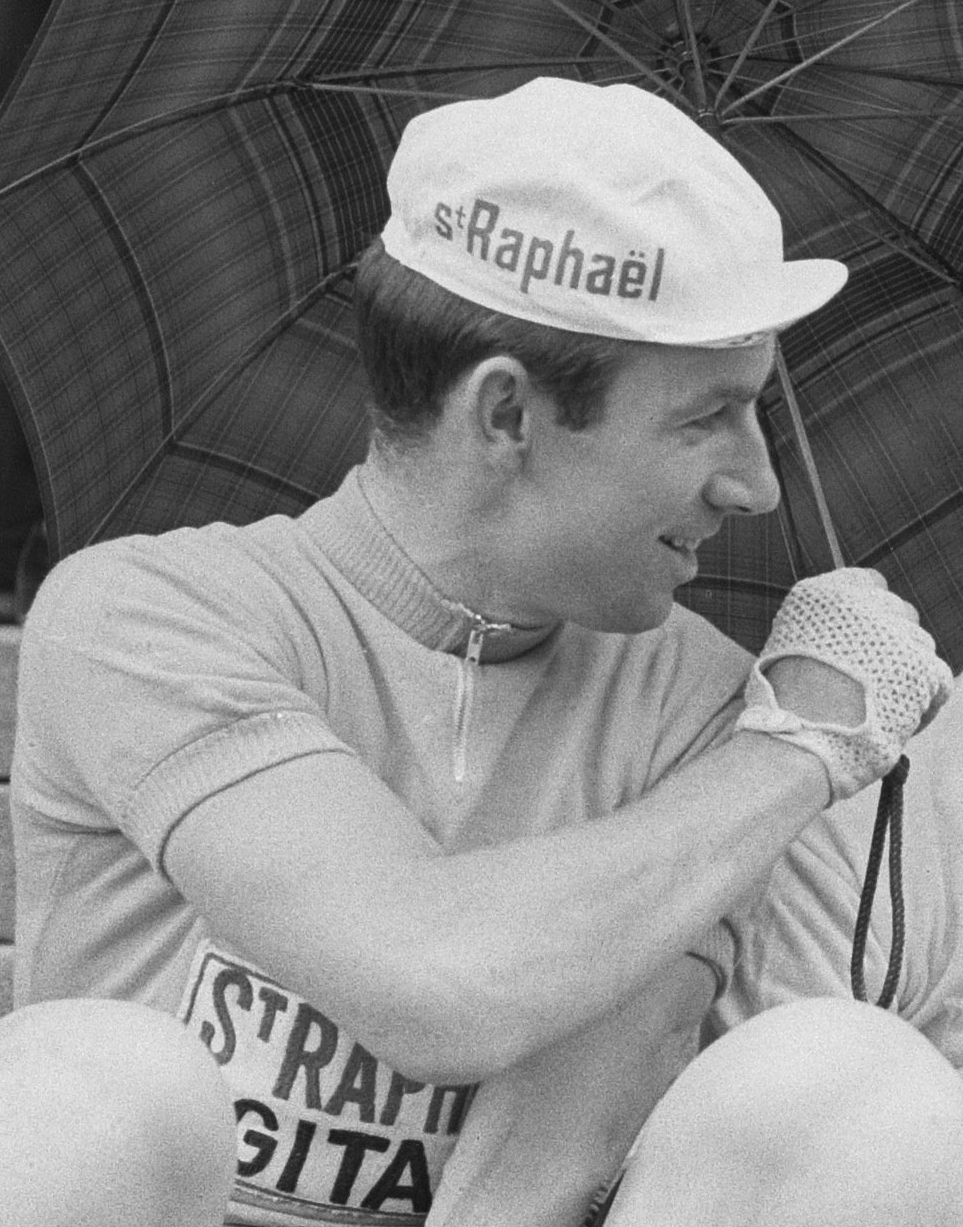
Elliott in 1963

Elliott signed as a professional for the Helyett-Félix Potin team (Helyett was a bicycle manufacturer). He won his first race, the GP d'Echo Alger in Algeria, outsprinting André Darrigade. He also won the GP Catox and the GP Isbergues. In his first major race of 1957, the Omloop "Het Volk" in Belgium, he made a race-long break with Englishman Brian Robinson. The break was caught near the finish but Elliott's form was noted. He won the Circuit de la Vienne. He became a team-mate of Jacques Anquetil and Jean Stablinski, staying with the team under different sponsors for much of his career.

In 1959 he won Omloop "Het Volk", the first foreigner to do so. He attacked on the Mur de Grammont with 30 km to ride and dropped all his rivals except Fred De Bruyne, the Belgian hope. The pair raced together to the finish where Elliott won easily.

That season Elliott rode the Tour de France, then run for national teams, in a mixed team that included the Englishman, Brian Robinson. Robinson rode above his level across the Massif Central and next day paid the price; he trailed far behind the field. William Fotheringham wrote:

In hot weather, these are some of the toughest roads in France, constantly rising and falling. Elliott remained with Robinson, chivvying him, pacing him, pouring water on his head as the Tour's doctor, Pierre Dumas administered glucose tablets. It was the kind of heroic spectacle the Tour reporters loved. Robinson en perdition ran the next day's headline in L'Équipe, which described Elliott's efforts as "attentions de mère poule" – the solicitousness of a mother hen.

Both finished outside the day's race elimination time limit, and expected to be sent home. However, the team's manager, Sauveur Ducazeaux, insisted the judges apply a rule that no rider in the first ten could be eliminated. Robinson had started the day ninth: it was Elliott who was sent home. "The mother hen was cooked; the chick avoided the pot", Fotheringham said. Robinson always regretted the outcome, and when he won the next stage, told journalists that he did it for Elliott.

In 1960, Elliott became the first English-speaking rider to win a stage at the Giro d'Italia. In 1962, he came third in the 1962 Vuelta a España, coming second in the points classification, and winning the fourth stage; he led the race for nine days.

In the 1962 world road championship at Salò in Italy, he got into the winning break with Stablinski. Stablinski was a team-mate in the professional peloton and a friend but a rival in the championship, where riders rode in national teams. However, Elliott and Stablinski worked to wear down the other break members. When Stablinski attacked, Elliott refused to chase and the Frenchman won alone. Elliott eventually broke away to take the silver medal. Elliott admitted he had sacrificed his chance for Stablinski's benefit. "Team loyalty was a theme that ran throughout Elliott's career," noted the editor of Cycling, Martin Ayres. Elliott said: "I'm not supposed to say that I helped Jean, but he's the best friend I've got in cycling and godfather to my son, Pascal. So I couldn't very well go after him, could I?"

His best result was in the 1963 Tour de France. He won by 33 seconds, enough to give him the yellow jersey of leadership. He held it for three days. Another 20 years passed before another Irishman, Sean Kelly, led the Tour. This achievement also made him the first English-speaker to lead the three great European tours, of Italy, Spain and France.

Elliott spent his career as a domestique, a rider who sacrifices his chances for his leader, but with the right to sprint for wins. He made a career from appearance contracts and start money, riding criteriums in Belgium – the races that Leulliot said would burn him out – and races in Britain, including a meeting at the velodrome at Herne Hill in London where the star attraction was the Italian, Fausto Coppi.

Elliott also rode and won the professional race on the Isle of Man, the Manx Premier.

=== Controversies ===
Elliott was contracted to ride London-Holyhead in 1965, at 275 miles the longest single-day race in the world not to use pacers. Tom Simpson won, beating Elliott and a domestic professional, Albert Hitchen. Controversy started the moment that Cycling printed a picture of the sprint. Elliott had his hands tugging his brakes before the line. The magazine suggested he was braking to avoid the crowd further down the road, but many thought it a fix. Another rider in the race, Pete Ryalls, said in Procycling in 2008:

The fix was for Barry Hoban to win. Barry was touch and go whether he'd get another contract because he'd done sweet FA all season. And it all went wrong because he didn't have the form anyway and it's a bloody long way if you don't have the legs. And the thing that messed it up was that going across Anglesey a big tall lanky guy called Peter Gordon. He pushed off and caused all sorts of consternation and the only people who could get across to him were Simpson and the guys he'd brought across with him, and Hitchen... so presumably they sorted it out between them afterwards, but that was the fix: that Hoban should win. I know for certain that it was.

Elliott, braking to stop Hitchen behind him, so Simpson could win, was riding in Simpson's pay. Simpson offered Elliott £1,000 to help him win the world championship in 1963. Elliott refused, speculation being that he had been offered more by someone else.

Elliott later wrote a newspaper article suggesting that he made more money by selling races than winning them.

== Decline ==
Elliott's career started to fade from the mid-1960s. He moved in 1966 from Anquetil's team to the rival Mercier-BP, sponsored by a bicycle company and an oil company and led by Anquetil's rival, Raymond Poulidor. Elliott planned for retirement by opening a hotel in Loctudy in Brittany. He had no prior experience in the hospitality trade and that project took so much of his time that he could ride only local races. After promising Mercier-BP that he would make amends in the world championship, the chain came off his bicycle and he finished 15th.

Things grew worse. His marriage to Marguerite, failed. The hotel, too, failed and Elliott lost all his money.

To try to restore his situation, he sold a story to the British tabloid newspaper, The People, telling of drug-taking and bribery. The article went into few details but was enough for him to be snubbed by other professionals. The same had happened to Simpson when he sold his story to the same paper but while Simpson recovered despite reprimands from his agent, criticism in the cycling press and a threat of dismissal by his team, Elliott's career never regained momentum. British cycling journalist Jock Wadley, who had shared a room with Elliott at the Simplex training camp, said: "I knew times were hard for him but nobody knew just how hard until he had to do that.

== Later years ==
Elliott returned to Dublin in 1967 and set up a metal-working business in Prince's Street in the city centre, with his father. Marguerite remained in France, with his only son, Pascal. Friends helped him to build a small apartment above the business.

Elliott tried a racing comeback in Britain in 1970 with the Falcon Cycles team and came 21st in his first race, London-Holyhead. Domestic professional racing was not as attractive or rewarding as continental. Combining cycling with a full-time job meant he struggled.

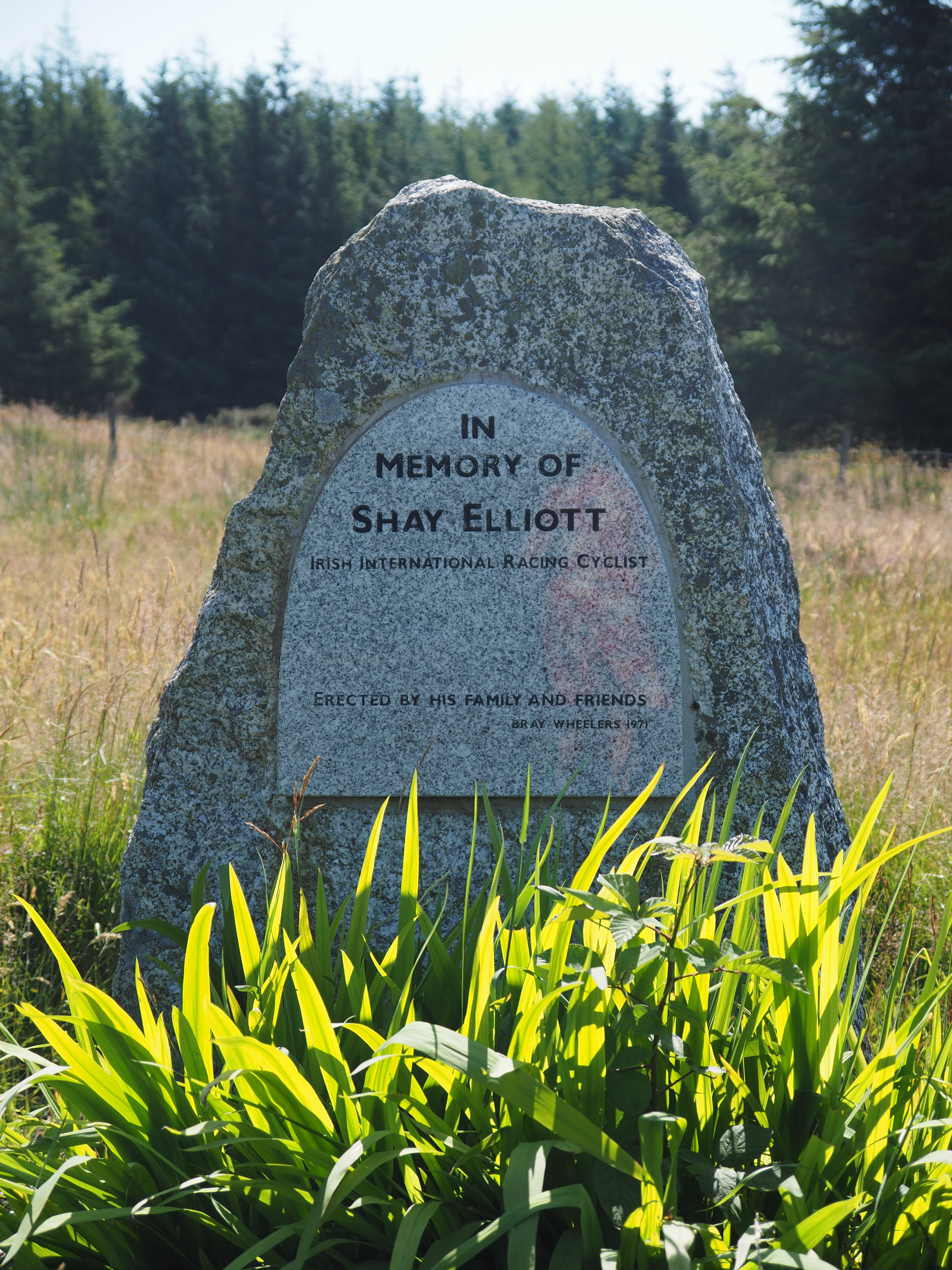
Memorial

=== Cycling in Ireland ===
Despite problems, he continued to ride – he was active with the Bray Wheelers club based in Wicklow, Ireland, training juniors and formulating plans for Irish cycling. He once ran for vice-president of the Irish Cycling Federation, but lost to Paddy McQuaid.

== Death ==
On 21 April 1971, his father died. Two weeks after his father's death, on 4 May 1971, Shay Elliott was found dead in the living quarters above the family business premises, at the age of just 36. The cause of death was a shotgun wound, rupturing his heart and liver, from a gun about whose unreliable fittings friends had warned him. The coroner recorded an "open verdict" and three competing theories circulated about the cause of death: that it was indeed a gun accident, that he committed suicide, and that he was killed by a Breton crime syndicate to whom he owed money from his failed hotel business (he had worried about people "hanging round" near the premises in previous weeks). He was laid to rest alongside his father at St Mochonog's Church, Kilmacanogue, County Wicklow.

== Legacy ==
The Shay Elliott Memorial Road Race, organised by Bray Wheelers Cycling Club, is run every year in Ireland in his honour. The race was previously (since 1959) known as the Route de Chill Mhantain (Circuit of Wicklow). It became the Shay Elliott Trophy in the late sixties, then the Shay Elliott Memorial after his death in 1971.

A monument to Elliott, erected by friends and Bray Wheelers Cycling Club, stands at the top of the climb from Drumgoff Bridge, Glenmalure heading towards Laragh, County Wicklow, where the race finishes.

Delegates from the Tour de France visited Elliott's grave when the Tour came to Ireland in 1998.

== Coverage ==
In 2009 a documentary film, Cycle of Betrayal, about Shay Elliott, was shown in Ireland (first on Setanta Ireland) and the UK. A book, a section of a book, and many articles, have also been written about Elliott.

== Major results ==
1953
1st Road race, National Amateur Road Championships
1954
1st Road race, National Road Championships
1955
1st Road race, National Road Championships
1956
1st Grand Prix d'Isbergues
1st Stage 3 Tour des Provinces du Sud-Est
1957
1st Points classification, Paris–Nice
3rd Paris–Bourges
3rd Grand Prix de Monaco
7th Tour of Flanders
7th Omloop Het Volk
1958
5th Overall Grand Prix du Midi Libre
6th Overall Four Days of Dunkirk

1st Points classification
1st Stages 2 & 3

7th Gent–Wevelgem
9th Overall Paris–Nice
1959
1st Omloop Het Volk
1st Grand Prix de Denain
1st Manx Trophy
9th Tour of Flanders
1960
1st Grand Prix Stan Ockers
1st Stage 18 Giro d'Italia
1st Stage 3a Roma–Napoli–Roma
2nd Genoa–Nice
5th Overall Four Days of Dunkirk
1961
1st Stage 2 Four Days of Dunkirk
1962
2nd Road race, UCI Road World Championships
2nd Paris–Camembert
3rd Overall Vuelta a España

1st Stage 4
Held after Stages 4–6 & 9–14

3rd Omloop Mandel-Leie-Schelde
10th Overall Grand Prix du Midi Libre
1963
Tour de France

1st Stage 3
Held after Stages 3–6a

1st Stage 13 Vuelta a España
2nd Overall Tour de l'Oise
2nd Paris–Camembert
3rd Grand Prix du Parisien
6th Overall Euskal Bizikleta
7th Rund um den Henninger Turm Frankfurt
1964
1st Overall Circuit du Morbihan
1st Manx Trophy
1965
1st Overall Tour de l'Oise

1st Stage 1

2nd Grand Prix de Monaco
3rd Overall Circuit du Morbihan
4th Overall Paris–Luxembourg
4th Gent–Wevelgem
10th Circuit de l'Aulne
1966
5th Gent–Wevelgem
6th Overall Paris–Luxembourg

=== Grand Tour general classification results timeline ===
Grand Tour	1956	1957	1958	1959	1960	1961	1962	1963	1964
Vuelta a España	—	—	—	—	—	—	3	41	—
Giro d'Italia	—	—	—	40	68	DNF	—	—	—
Tour de France	DNF	—	48	DNF	—	47	—	61	DNF

Legend
—	Did not compete
DNF	Did not finish
