= José Herrero =

Spanish cyclist (born 1934)

Personal information
- Full name: José Herrero Berrendero
- Born: 11 January 1934 (age 92) Madrid, Spain

Cycling career
- Sport: Cycling
- Role: Rider

José Herrero Berrendero (born 11 January 1934) is a former Spanish racing cyclist. He finished in last place in the 1960 Tour de France.
