= Albertus Geldermans =

Dutch cyclist (1935–2025)

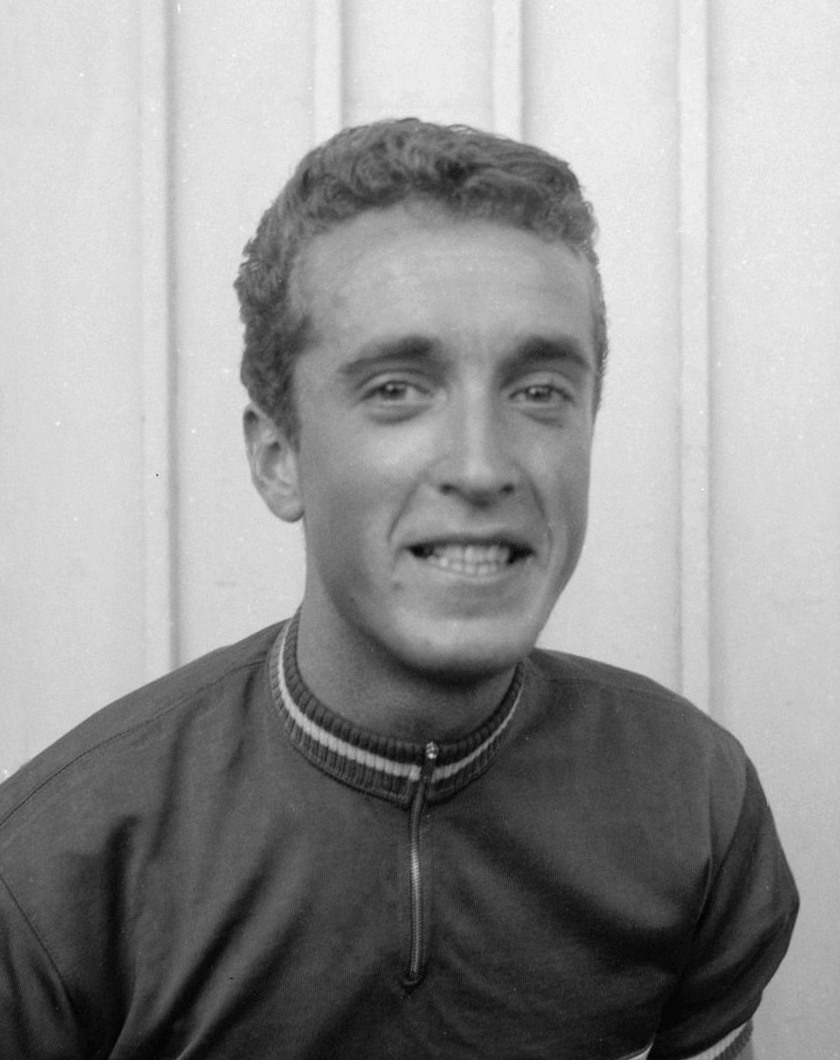
- Geldermans in 1957

Personal information
- Full name: Albertus Geldermans
- Nickname: Ab
- Born: 17 March 1935 Beverwijk, Netherlands
- Died: 20 April 2025 (aged 90)

Cycling career
- Sport: Cycling
- Discipline: Road
- Role: Rider

Major wins
- Liège–Bastogne–Liège (1960)

Albertus "Ab" Geldermans (17 March 1935 – 20 April 2025) was a Dutch professional road bicycle racer and directeur sportif. He was professional from 1959 to 1966 and rode seven editions of the Tour de France. In 1962 he finished fifth overall and wore the yellow jersey for two days. In 1960 Geldermans won Liège–Bastogne–Liège and won the Deutschland Tour. In 1962 he was Dutch road race champion. Afterwards he became directeur sportif of the Dutch national cycling team that competed in the 1967 Tour de France and directed Jan Janssen to victory in the 1968 Tour de France.

Geldermans died on 20 April 2025, at the age of 90. He had been the oldest living Tour de France' yellow-jersey holder up until his death.

== Major results ==
1957
Ronde van Gouda
Ronde van het IJsselmeer
Ronde van Zuid-Holland
1958
Noordwijkerhout
1959
Beverwijk
Merelbeke
Merksem
Wielsbeke
1960
Deutschland Tour
Weekend Ardennais
Liège–Bastogne–Liège
1961
Menton-Roma
Millau
Four Days of Dunkirk
1962
(Netherlands) Dutch National Road Race Championship
Netherlands national time trial champion
Tour de France:

5th place overall classification
Wearing yellow jersey for two days

Pontivy
Vuelta a España:

Winner stage 10
10th place overall classification

1963
GP du Midi-Libre
Manché-Océan
1964
Grand Prix du Parisien

== See also ==
- List of Dutch cyclists who have led the Tour de France general classification
