= Ernesto Bono =

Italian cyclist

Personal information
- Born: 25 April 1936 (age 90)

Cycling career
- Sport: Cycling
- Role: Rider

Ernesto Bono (born 25 April 1936) is an Italian racing cyclist. He finished in ninth place in the 1959 Giro d'Italia.
