= Jean Graczyk =

French cyclist

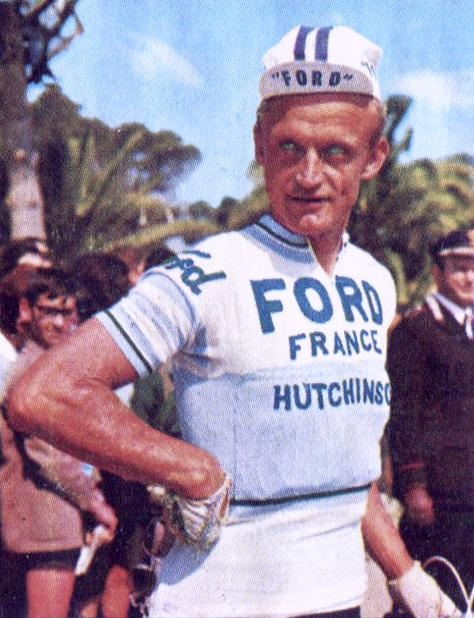
- Graczyk circa 1966

Personal information
- Full name: Jean Graczyk
- Nickname: Popof
- Born: 26 May 1933 Neuvy-sur-Barangeon, France
- Died: 27 June 2004 (aged 71) Vierzon, France

Cycling career
- Sport: Cycling
- Current team: Retired
- Discipline: Road
- Role: Rider
- Rider type: Sprinter

Professional teams
- 1957–1962: Helyett–Potin
- 1963–1964: Margnat–Paloma–Dunlop
- 1965–1966: Ford France–Gitane
- 1967–1968: Bic–Hutchinson
- 1969–1970: Sonolor–Lejeune
- 1971: Individual
- 1972: Rokado–Colders

Major wins
- Grand Tours Tour de France Points classification (1958, 1960) 5 individual stages (1959, 1960) Vuelta España 5 individual stages (1958, 1962) One-day races and Classics Critérium National de la Route (1960)
Medal record
Men's track cycling
Representing France
Olympic Games
Silver medal – second place	1956 Melbourne	Team pursuit

Jean Graczyk (26 May 1933 – 27 June 2004) was a French road bicycle racer who won two points classifications in the Tour de France and several stages each at the Tour de France and Vuelta a España. Before turning professional, Graczyk won an Olympic silver medal in the team pursuit for France.

His nickname in the sport was Popof. The American-French journalist René de Latour jokingly said in the British monthly Sporting Cyclist that it was because of his habit of attacking alone, or "popping off". De Latour, however, depended too heavily on his readers' understanding of French slang, because Popof is a semi-derogatory term in French for someone of Polish background. The "popping off" suggestion, however, is still widely believed and appears from time to time in histories of the sport.

== Major results ==
1956
Summer Olympics:

(silver) Silver medal team pursuit

France national amateur road race champion
1957
Vailly-sur-Sauldre
Tour du Sud-Est
1958
Cluny
Orchies
Vuelta a España:

Winner stage 13B

Pleurtuit
Tour de France:

Winner Points classification

1959
Antibes
Hyères
Ronde d'Aix-en-Provence
Saint-Denis l'Hotel
Trofeo Longines (with Jacques Anquetil, André Darrigade, Seamus Elliott and Michel Vermeulin)
Paris–Nice
Tour de France:

Winner stage 5

1960
Tour de France:

Winner stages 4, 12, 17 and 21

Winner Points classification
Critérium International

- Super Prestige Pernod International

Brignolles
GP Monaco
Saint-Claud
Saint-Hilaire de Harcouet
1961
Challenge Laurens
GP de Fréjus
Neuvic sur l'isle
Roma-Napoli-Roma
Saint-Just-sur-Loire
Sanvignes
Vailly-sur-Sauldre
La Charité-sur-Loire
1962
GP Vercors
Lubersac
Vuelta a España:

Winner stages 6, 13, 14 and 16

Soings
1963
GP Monaco
Soing-en-Sologne
Vailly-sur-Sauldre
Royan
Montélimar
1964
Gap
Montélimar
1965
Belvès
Sin-le-Noble
Vailly-sur-Sauldre
Montélimar
1969
Quesnoy
