= Jean Stablinski =

French cyclist

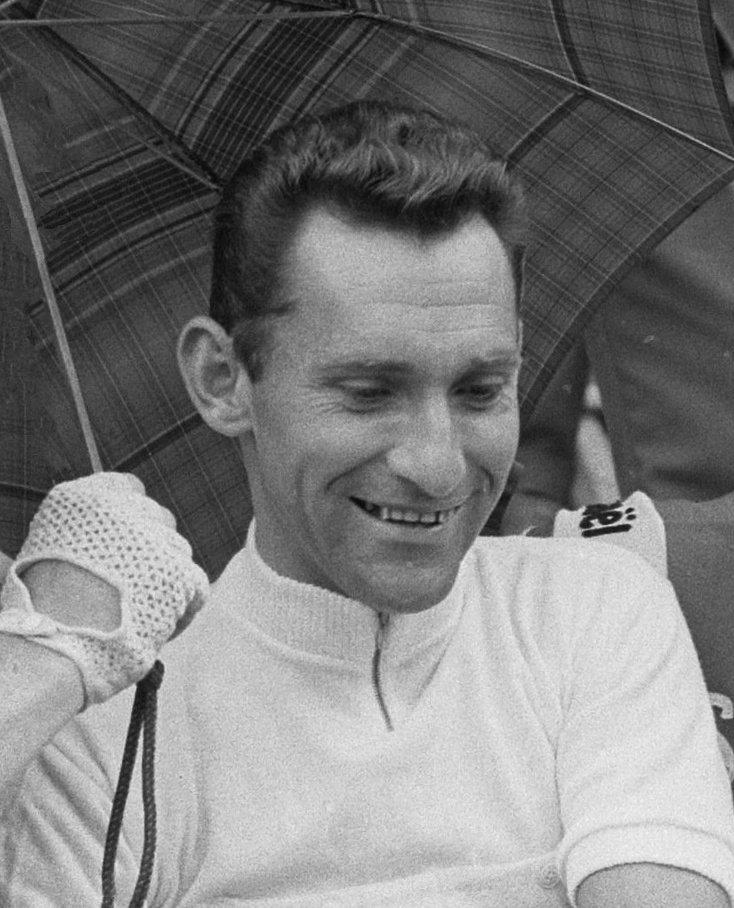
- Stablinski at the 1963 Tour de France

Personal information
- Full name: Jean Stablewski
- Born: 21 May 1932 Thun-Saint-Amand, France
- Died: 22 July 2007 (aged 75)

Cycling career
- Sport: Cycling
- Discipline: Road
- Role: Rider

Professional teams
- 1952–1955: Gitane–Hutchinson
- 1956–1958: Essor–Leroux
- 1959–1961: Helyett–Leroux–Fynsec–Hutchinson
- 1962–1964: Saint-Raphaël–Helyett–Hutchinson
- 1965–1966: Ford France–Gitane
- 1967: Bic–Hutchinson
- 1968: Mercier–BP–Hutchinson

Major wins
- Grand Tours Tour de France 5 individual stages (1957, 1961, 1962, 1964, 1967) Giro d'Italia 2 individual stages (1960, 1967) Vuelta a España General classification (1958) 3 individual stages (1958, 1962, 1963) 1 TTT stage (1958) Stage races Tour du Sud-Est (1954) Tour of Belgium (1965) One-day races and Classics World Road Race Championships (1962) National Road Race Championships (1960, 1962, 1963, 1964) Paris–Bourges (1954) Paris-Brussels (1963) GP Frankfurt (1965) Amstel Gold Race (1966)
Medal record
Men's road bicycle racing
Representing France
World Championships
Gold medal – first place	1962 Salò di Garda	Elite Men's Road Race

Jean Stablewski (21 May 1932 – 22 July 2007), known as Jean Stablinski, was a French professional cyclist from a family of Polish immigrants. He rode from 1952 to 1968, winning 105 races as a professional. He won the national road championship four times - 1960, 1962, 1963 and 1964. He was also world road champion in 1962, and won the Vuelta a España in 1958.

== Biography ==
Jean Stablinski was born in Thun-Saint-Amand in the mining area of the Nord department of France, the son of Polish immigrants. His father died in a work accident in 1946 and Jean, at 14, started working in the mine to provide income for his family. It was at this time that he won a bicycle in an accordion competition. Legend says that his mother was so displeased by her son's new hobby that she damaged his bike.

Jean, still known as Stablewski, became naturalised as French at 16 and rode his first races. It was while riding the Peace Race that a journalist's error in writing his name 'Stablinski' created the surname by which he became known.

== Professional career ==
Stablinski turned professional at 21. From 1958 until 1967 he rode in the same teams as Jacques Anquetil, always as a support rider, or domestique. Stablinski won the national road championship four times and came second twice, all within six years, an achievement no rider has matched.

Stablinski stayed with Anquetil until his team-mate wrote a series of newspaper articles, one of which Stablinski believed criticised him even though he had devoted his career to Anquetil. The two rarely spoke after that and Stablinski joined the team headed by Anquetil's biggest rival, Raymond Poulidor.

Stablinski was recognised as a rider who made up for physical limitations by his tactical sense and his chance to profit from the moment. His knack, riders recognised, was to recognise which breakaway attempt would count and not to waste effort on the others.

Stablinski was twice suspended for doping.

== Retirement ==
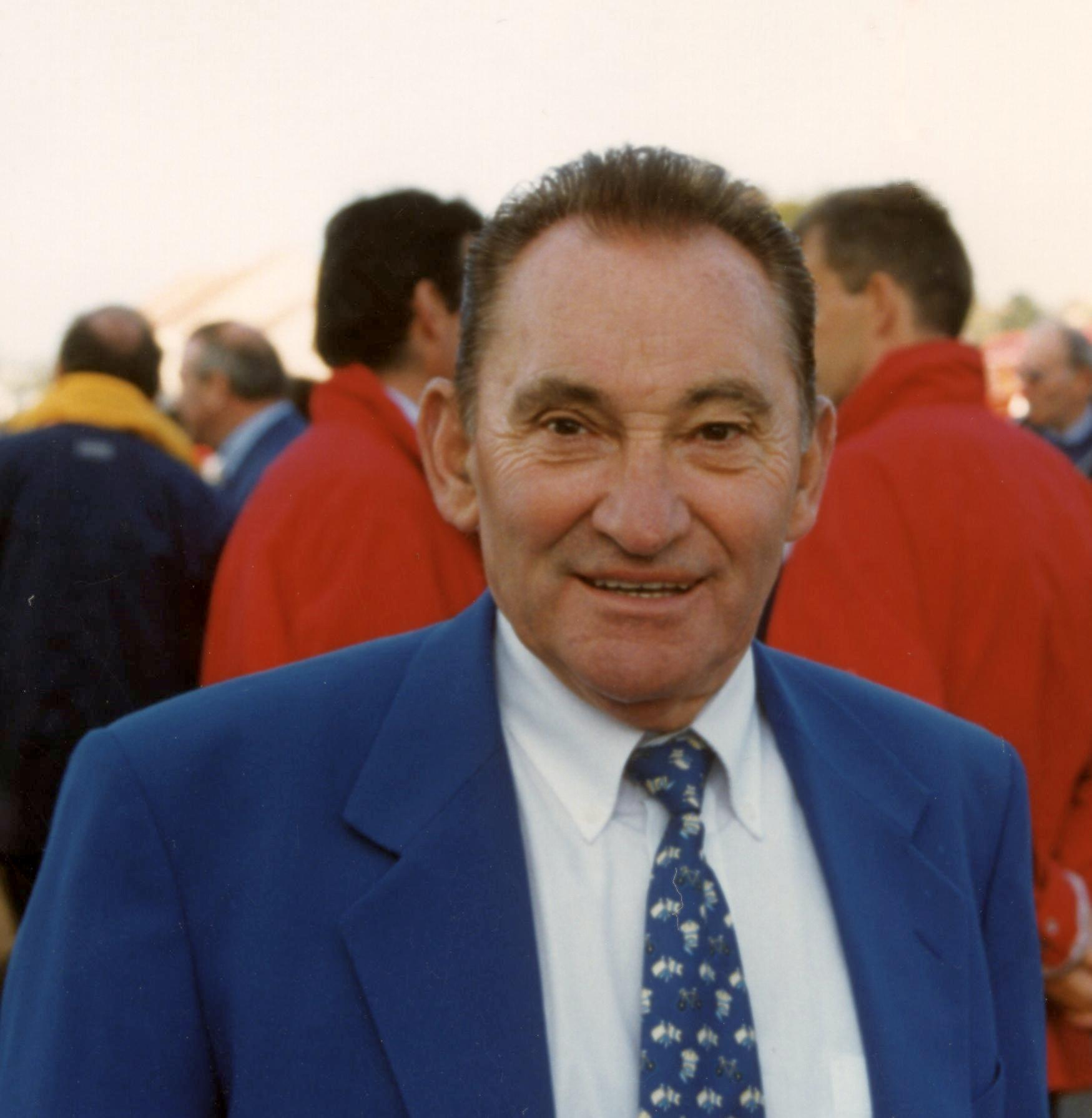
Stablinski in 1997

Stablinski retired from racing and was for six years manager of the Sonolor-Lejeune, signing Lucien Van Impe and Bernard Hinault as young unknowns. His son, Jacques Stablinski, born 1956, also became a professional cyclist and rode for Gitane-Campagnolo. He became known as "Petit Stab" but never had his father's talent.

Jean Stablinski never stopped riding a bike until the illness that led to his death. He said he never put a drinks bottle on his bike when he rode for pleasure. He had spent too many years racing as a professional with no chance to stop and look around or to meet people, he told the historian Jean-Paul Ollivier on French television. If he had no water on his bike but a few euros in his pocket, he could stop and buy a drink at any bar he fancied and get into conversation with whomever he met.

He became a member of Les Amis de Paris–Roubaix, enthusiasts and workers for the spring classic. It was Stablinski who suggested that the route take in a cobbled path through the Arenberg forest known as the "Trouée d'Arenberg", or "Arenberg Trench". His qualifications were impeccable: as a miner he had worked beneath the road and as a cyclist he had ridden along it.

He died after a long illness. On 7 April 2008 he was remembered by a memorial beside the Wallers-Arenberg road he had introduced to Paris–Roubaix. The memorial was made in blue limestone from Soignies by the sculptor Michel Karpovitch. The Velodrome Couvert Regional Jean-Stablinski in Roubaix is named after him.

== Major results ==
1954
1st Paris–Bourges
1956
1st Tour du Sud-Est
1957
1st Stage 12 Tour de France
1958
1st Overall Vuelta a España

1st Stages 5a (TTT) & 8

1960
1st Road race, National Road Championships
1st Stage 13 Giro d'Italia
1961
1st Stage 7 Tour de France
1962
1st Road race, UCI Road World Championships
1st Road race, National Road Championships
1st Stage 14 Tour de France
1st Stage 11 Vuelta a España
1963
1st Road race, National Road Championships
1st Paris–Brussels
1st Stage 10 Vuelta a España
1st Stage 4 Critérium du Dauphiné Libéré
1964
1st Road race, National Road Championships
1st Stage 21 Tour de France
1965
1st Overall Tour of Belgium
1st Rund um den Henninger-Turm
1st Trofeo Baracchi (with Jacques Anquetil)
1st Stage 4 Grand Prix du Midi Libre
1966
1st Amstel Gold Race
1967
1st Stage 19 Tour de France
1st Stage 8 Giro d'Italia
1968
1st Grand Prix de Denain
