= Jean-Claude Annaert =

French cyclist (1935–2020)

Personal information
- Born: 22 August 1935 Paris, France
- Died: 12 September 2020 (aged 85)

Cycling career
- Sport: Cycling
- Role: Rider

Jean-Claude Annaert (22 August 1935 – 12 September 2020) was a French racing cyclist. He rode in the 1957 Tour de France, and won stage eight of the 1962 Vuelta a España. Annaert died on 12 September 2020, aged 85.
