= Michel Stolker =

Dutch cyclist (1933–2018)

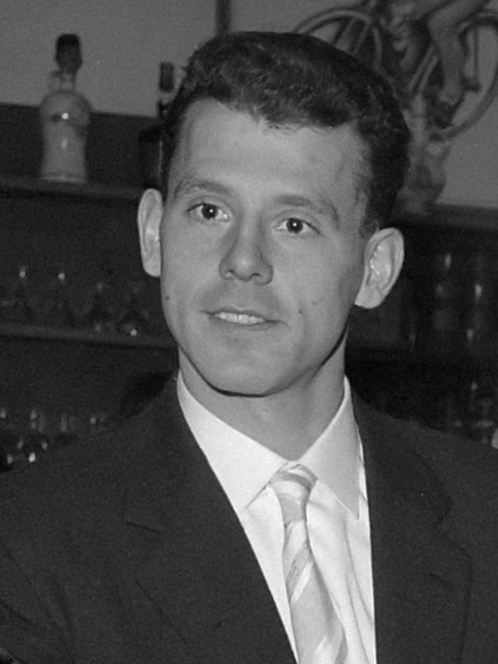
- Michel Stolker in 1962

Personal information
- Born: 29 September 1933 Zuilen, Netherlands
- Died: 28 May 2018 (aged 84)

Cycling career
- Sport: Cycling
- Role: Rider

Michel Stolker (29 September 1933 – 28 May 2018) was a Dutch former professional racing cyclist. He rode in three editions of the Tour de France, and won stages in the Giro d'Italia and the Vuelta a España. Stolker died on 28 May 2018 at the age of 84.

== Biography ==
In his first year as a professional rider, Stolker won a stage in the 1956 Giro d'Italia, and the Italian press called him "the best Dutch renner ever". In 1962, Stolker rode for a French team, and helped Jacques Anquetil won the 1962 Tour de France, after finishing seventh in that year's Vuelta a España. He also won the Grand Prix du Midi Libre that year. His last big victory was the eighth stage in the 1964 Vuelta a España. Stolker ended his career in 1966.
