= Rik Van Looy =

Belgian cyclist (1933–2024)

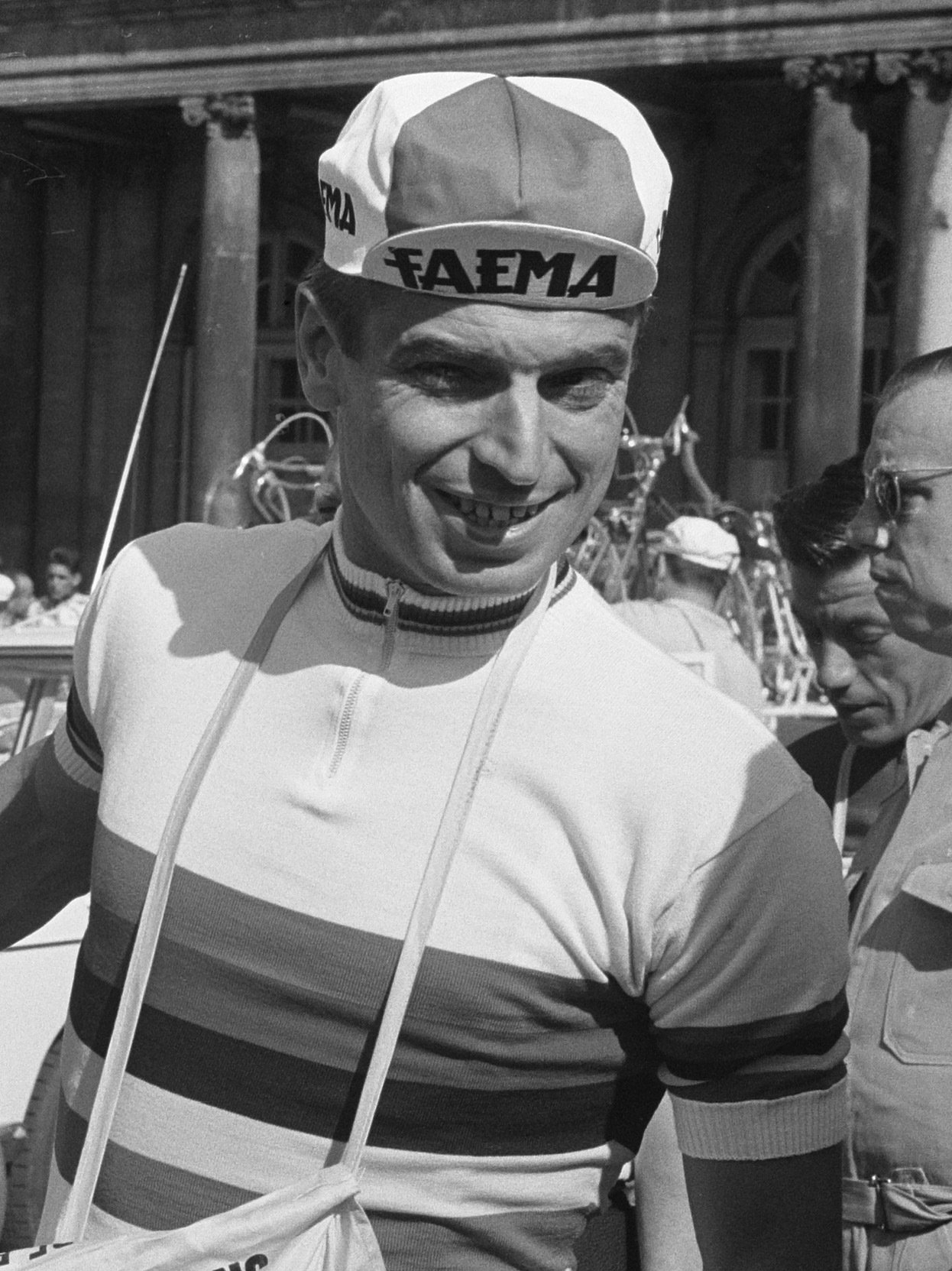
- Van Looy at the 1962 Tour de France

Personal information
- Nicknames: Rik II (Rik I is Van Steenbergen); Keizer Van Herentals (Emperor of Herentals)
- Born: Henri Van Looy; 20 December 1933 Grobbendonk, Belgium
- Died: 17 December 2024 (aged 90) Herentals, Belgium

Cycling career
- Sport: Cycling
- Role: Rider
- Rider type: All-rounder

Professional teams
- 1953–1954: l'Avenir
- 1953–1954: Gitane–Hutchinson
- 1954: Touring
- 1954: Bianchi–Pirelli
- 1955: Van Hauwaert–Maes Pils
- 1956–1961: Faema–Guerra
- 1962: Flandria–Faema–Clément
- 1963: G.B.C.–Libertas
- 1964–1966: Solo–Superia
- 1967–1970: Willem II–Gazelle

Major wins
- Grand Tours Tour de France Points classification (1963) 7 individual stages (1963, 1965, 1969) 1 TTT Stage (1962) Combativity award (1963) Giro d'Italia Mountains classification (1960) 12 individual stages (1959, 1960, 1961, 1962) Vuelta a España Points classification (1959, 1965) 18 individual stages (1958, 1959, 1964, 1965) One-day races and Classics World Road Race Championships (1960, 1961) National Road Race Championship (1958, 1963) Milan–San Remo (1958) Tour of Flanders (1959, 1962) Paris–Roubaix (1961, 1962, 1965) Liège–Bastogne–Liège (1961) Giro di Lombardia (1959) Gent–Wevelgem (1956, 1957, 1962) La Flèche Wallonne (1968) Paris–Tours (1959, 1967)
Medal record
Representing Belgium
Olympic Games
Gold medal – first place	1952 Helsinki	Team road race
Men's road bicycle racing
World Championships
Gold medal – first place	1960 Karl Marx Stadt	Road Race
Gold medal – first place	1961 Bern	Road Race
Silver medal – second place	1956 Copenhagen	Road Race
Silver medal – second place	1963 Ronse	Road Race
Bronze medal – third place	1953 Lugano	Amateur Road Race
Men's track cycling
European Championships
Silver medal – second place	1962 Zürich	Madison
Bronze medal – third place	1962 Berlin	Derny

Henri "Rik" Van Looy (20 December 1933 – 17 December 2024) was a Belgian professional cyclist of the post-war period. Nicknamed the King of the Classics or Emperor of Herentals (after the small Belgian city where he lived), he dominated the classic cycle races in the late 1950s and early 1960s.

Van Looy was twice world professional road race champion, and was the first cyclist to win all five 'Monuments': the most prestigious one-day classics – a feat since achieved by just two others (both also Belgians: Roger De Vlaeminck and Eddy Merckx).

With 367 professional road victories, he ranks second all-time behind Eddy Merckx. Van Looy is ninth on the all-time list of Grand Tour stage winners with thirty-seven victories. These numbers could still have risen had he not been the victim of a significant number of falls resulting in serious injuries. Remarkable was his sporting rivalry with two other cycling legends: namely the successful Rik Van Steenbergen at the beginning of Van Looy's career. Conversely, Van Looy had to face the generational change with a young Eddy Merckx at the end of his career.

== Early life ==
Rik Van Looy was born in 1933 in Grobbendonk, in the Antwerp Province. As a child, Van Looy was fascinated by cycling. Before the age of 13, he worked as a paper boy. The foundation of his further career was laid in that period, by daily riding on a packed, much too heavy bicycle.

In his very first races as a youngster, however, he did not yet stand out as the big talent.

== Career ==
=== Amateur years ===
Van Looy rose to prominence when he won the Belgian amateur road championship in 1952. He repeated the victory the following year, adding third place in the world title race the same year, before turning professional. He took part in the 1952 Summer Olympics in Helsinki, participating in the road race, but without completing it. Instead, he and his teammates won the gold medal in the team road race. At the age of 19, Van Looy won the bronze medal in the World Championship amateur road race in Lugano.

=== 1953–1960 ===
A powerful sprinter, Van Looy won two races in what was left of his first professional season (1953), and 20 more over the next couple of seasons. In 1956, his victories included Gent–Wevelgem and Paris–Brussels, plus two stages and overall victory in the Tour of the Netherlands. He also won a silver medal in the world road race championship, behind his countryman Rik Van Steenbergen (whom the team was obliged to ride for).

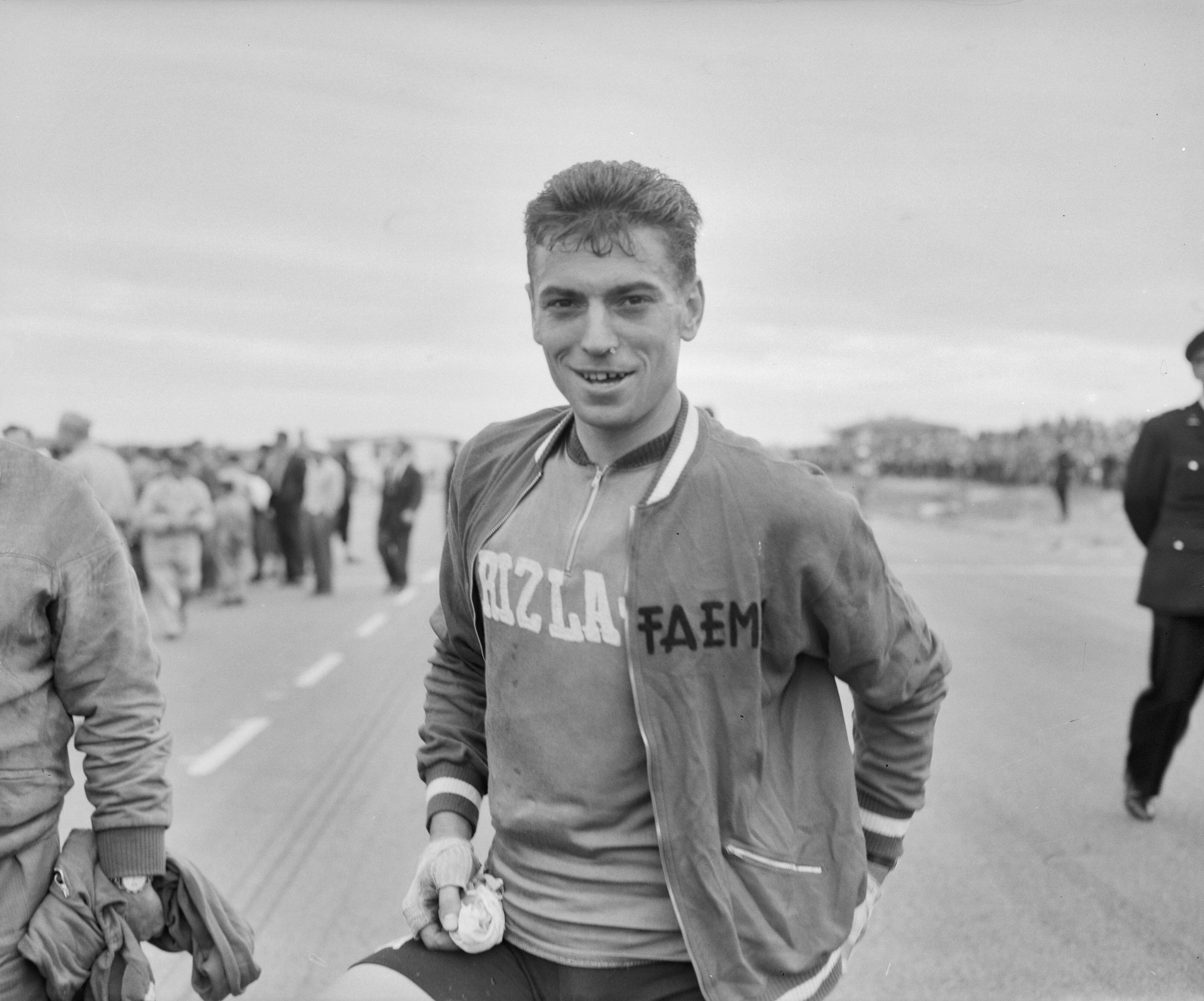
Van Looy after winning a 1956 Tour of the Netherlands stage

He repeated his Gent–Wevelgem and Tour of the Netherlands victories in 1957, and in 1958, Van Looy won the season's opening classic, Milan–San Remo.

1959 saw Van Looy take the early-season Tour of Flanders and the autumn classic, the Giro di Lombardia. In between, he scored another 38 victories, including three stages of the Vuelta a España (finishing third overall and winning the points competition) and four stages of the Giro d'Italia (for 4th overall).

=== 1961–1966 ===
In 1960, he scored the first of two consecutive victories in the world road race championship, but "classic" victories eluded him. However, he made up for this in 1961, winning both Paris–Roubaix and Liège–Bastogne–Liège – making him the first rider to take all five 'Monuments' – as well as retaining his rainbow world title jersey, and taking three stages, plus the mountains competition in the Giro d' Italia.

Van Looy scored two more Classic wins in 1962 (Paris–Roubaix, Tour of Flanders), took another Gent–Wevelgem, and two more Giro stages. At the age of 28, he made his debut in the 1962 Tour de France as one of the major favorites. Van Looy's strategy was to exhaust co-favorites Federico Bahamontes and Jacques Anquetil before the mountain stages started. However, after ten stages in which Van Looy gave a spectacle, he was forced to abandon the Tour because of a collision with a motorcyclist. Tour director Jacques Goddet publicly regretted his departure.

"My main rival in the tours wasn’t Baldini, Gaul or Poulidor. It was Van Looy. I had to match him in the flat stages and even in the mountains, because if I didn’t, he would turn up in the time-trials with a 15-minute advantage."

— Jacques Anquetil on Van Looy

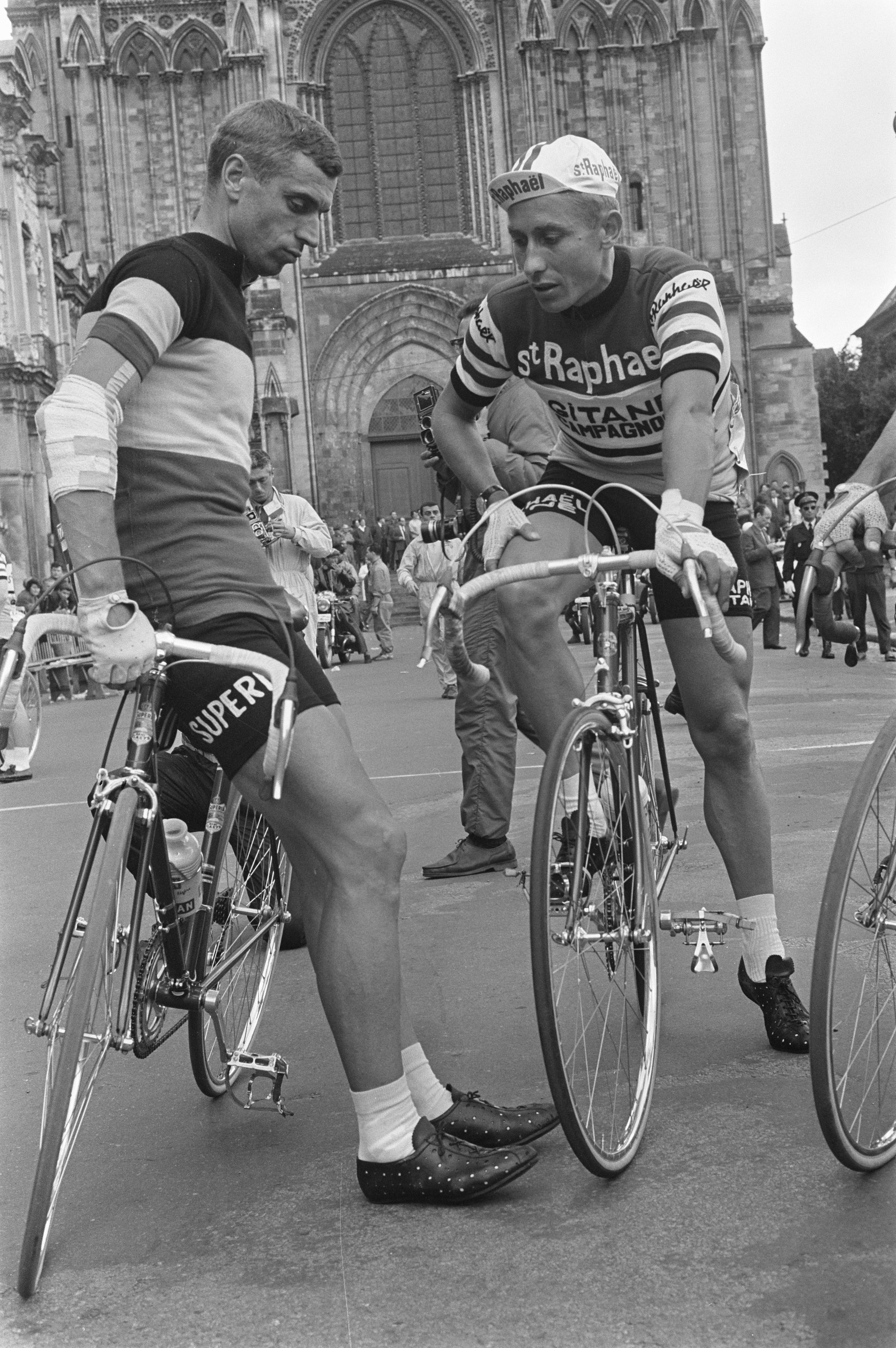
Van Looy talking with Jacques Anquetil in the 1964 Tour de France

In 1963 Van Looy rode the Tour de France again, taking four stages en route to victory in the points competition and a 10th place on general classification. He also grabbed a silver medal in the world title race. In the latter race, held in Ronse in his native Belgium, he was beaten in the sprint by his countryman Benoni Beheyt who manually pushed Van Looy aside. Van Looy, starting the sprint too early, did not take this defeat lightly. This race has remained memorable in the history of Belgian cycling.

In 1965, he scored 42 victories, including Paris–Roubaix, and eight stages of the Vuelta on his way to his second third place overall (his highest placing in a Grand Tour). Van Looy also took two stages in the Tour de France.

=== 1966–1970 ===
During the final years of his career, Rik Van Looy's road performances began to fade, as the new Belgian star Eddy Merckx rose to prominence, but he still grabbed second in the 1967 Paris–Roubaix. He won La Flèche Wallonne in 1968, becoming the only cyclist to win all 8 original classics. Van Looy also took a stage of the 1969 Tour de France. His rivalry with Eddy Merckx reached the height of sabotage of Merckx in the world championships organized in Belgium, in 1969.

=== Track cycling career ===
Van Looy was also a star on the track, winning 12 Six-day races. His first came in Brussels in 1957, his last in Antwerp in 1968. For ten of these victories, he was paired with Dutchman Peter Post.

In the winter of 1956 he was paired with Rik Van Steenbergen for some track races. Events that many looked forward to, but the plans were shelved after they both had arguments during the 1956 world championship in Copenhagen. The two Riks would eventually ride together in a few Six-days races in 1963.

== Riding style ==
Van Looy was a very powerful sprinter, rather heavy for his height due to his muscular legs. In mountain stages, he was usually able to keep up the pace of the true climbers, but less able to make the difference.

The power he could exert was unprecedented at the time. During his victory in 1961 UCI Road World Championships, his back wheel collapsed just after he crossed the finish line because his powerful stroke had ripped out several of the spokes. This incident earned him the nickname “The Wheelbreaker”.

Despite his sprint qualities, he usually wanted to avoid the sprint by escaping earlier. Van Looy enjoyed the cheering of the crowd more during solo arrivals. There was no time for that, while participating in a sprint and preparing for it.

Van Looy's popularity was mainly due to his attacking style of cycling. His early escapes already quickly created excitement in races in which he participated.

He could also motivate himself knowing he was being chased by competitors. This is also why he did not excel in individual time trials, it fascinated him less. Yet that shortcoming is hard to link with a man who could ride in the lead for miles without a flinch, visibly hurting his opponents. The more calculated riding during stage races, was at odds with his attacking style. As a result, he never won the overall classification in a Grand Tour, which also always included time trials. He did win overall victories in shorter stage races (in the 1965 Giro di Sardegna for example, by winning 5 out of 6 stages).

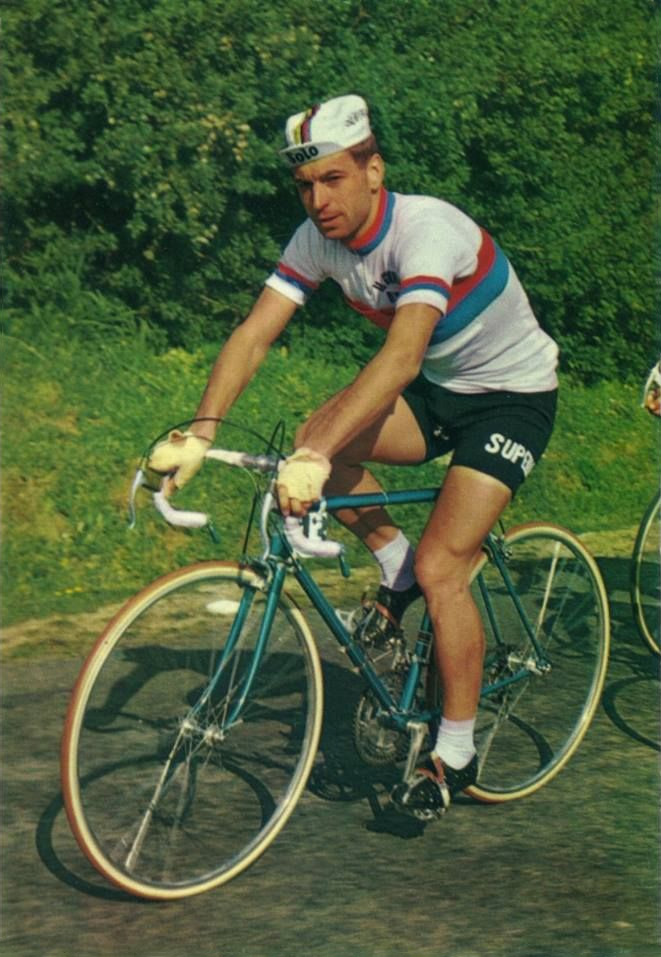
Rik Van Looy wearing the Giro di Sardegna winner's jersey in 1965

== Leadership ==
Van Looy did not spare himself during preparations for races, which were characterized by spartan training methods combined with a carefully selected diet.

Gradually, he stood out for his dominant character, both in his team and in the peloton. His leadership was strict, but always fair. Because of him, the term "team captain" was brought to a higher level. He worked out the fledgling leader-domestique system to perfection, and the team had to ride entirely in his service. Instead of the team manager, he himself decided the tactics, which riders were best suited for this and even what they would earn.

The Flandria-Faema team that was built around Van Looy was nicknamed the Red Brigade by the peloton and public, after the red jerseys the riders wore.

== 1963 World Championship incident ==
The 1963 world championship in Ronse seemed an ideal opportunity to triumph a third time, with a course that suited Van Looy, and this time supported by a home crowd.

The Belgian team would be riding completely for Van Looy, but during the race it turned out that Gilbert Desmet and Benoni Beheyt (both riding for a different brand team than Van Looy) had other plans. At the end of the race, Desmet escaped and Van Looy was forced to start the sprint much earlier than expected, after which Beheyt (pushing away on Van Looy's shoulder) eventually finished first.

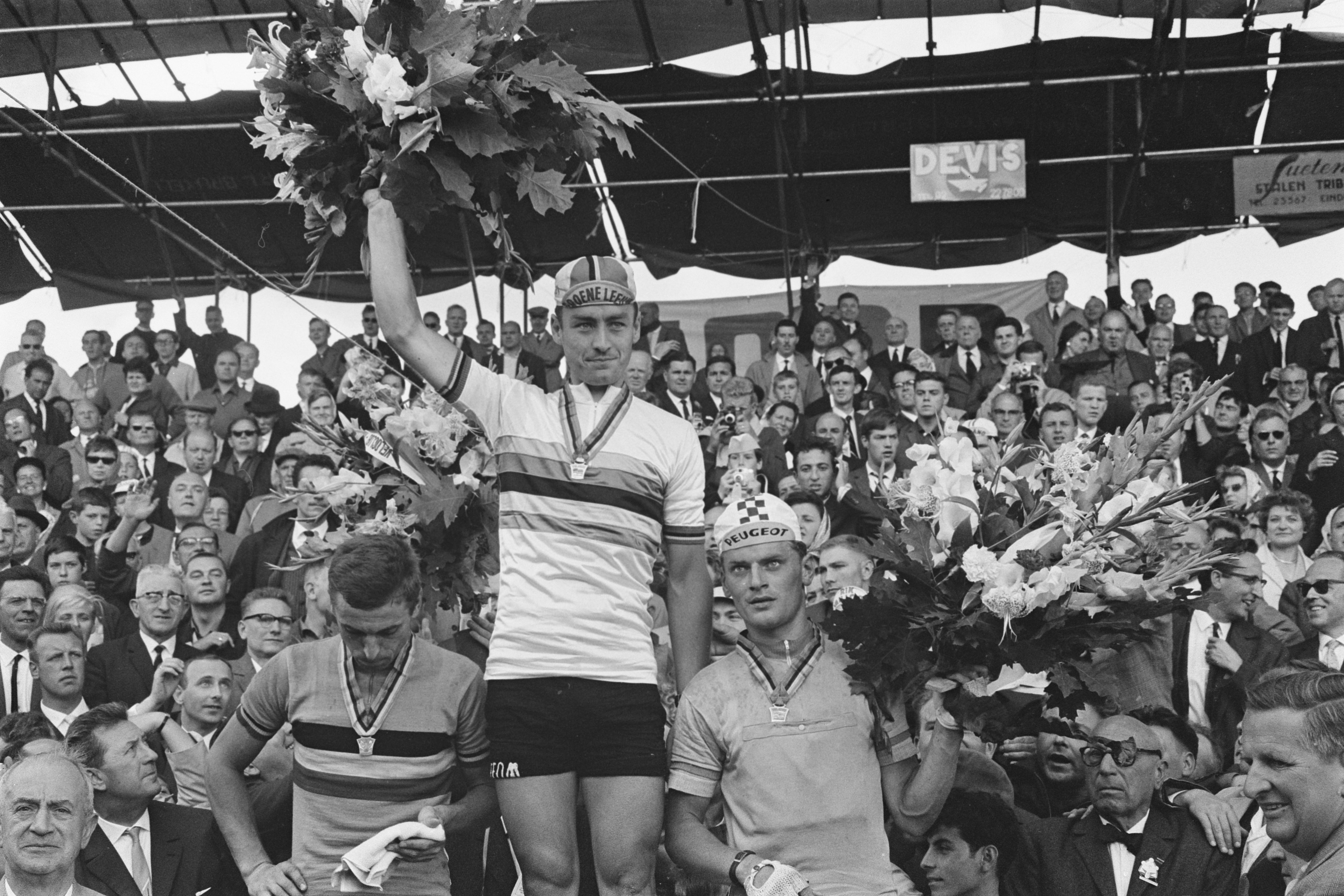
Van Looy, Beheyt and De Roo on the stage of a controversial 1963 World Championship

The jury only briefly considered the problem of the obviously irregular sprint and did not change the final result. The medals were awarded in front of a rather confused audience, with both Van Looy and Beheyt having a hard time smiling. The story about the Betrayal of Ronse dragged on for a long time in the press and public, and crowds of people showed up at races where both gentlemen would start.

It didn't really seem to bother Van Looy, he enjoyed the commotion that cycling caused. Nevertheless, it is suggested that he systematically thwarted Beheyt's career afterwards. Fact is that the latter already stopped cycling a few years later at the age of 27, also due to injury problems.

The two gentlemen turned out to be on good terms after that, although neither of them seldom wanted to talk about the 1963 world championship again in interviews.

== Retirement ==
On 22 August 1970, after a race, Van Looy decided to quit professional cycling immediately and in all discretion. Unlike his predecessor Rik Van Steenbergen, he resolutely refused a lucrative "farewell tour" via criteria and track races. Neither was he interested in a high-paying farewell cycling race in the Antwerp Sports Palace.

Not surprisingly, he subsequently was appointed as team manager for Willem II–Gazelle. Afterwards he became a driver-consultant for a newspaper and magazine during races and in a later phase director of the Flemish cycling school in Herentals, the city of which he is now an honorary citizen.

In his house nothing reminds of his glorious past. "What's past is past. All the trophies, jerseys and medals,... I've given it all away. To charities, supporters and friends, it means more to them than to me" Van Looy once mentioned.

== Personal life and death ==
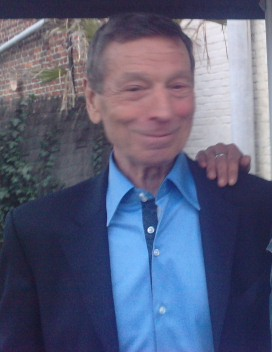
Rik Van Looy in 2010

Rik Van Looy married Nini Mariën in 1955. Both formed a close-knit couple. Nini was partly behind the top career Rik Van Looy was able to build. She was one of the most famous riders' wives in the peloton in the 1950s and 1960s, and put her life entirely at the service of Van Looy's career.

The couple had a daughter and a son. Van Looy rode on incentives, which could also come from his family. When he lectured his young son by saying "when will you come home with a good school report again?" the boy's response was "when will you win another classic again?" The following week, the 34-year-old Van Looy won La Flèche Wallonne.

After a lingering illness, his wife died in 2021 at the age of 88. By then, Van Looy had already withdrawn from public life for a while to assist her. "She has done so much for me, now it's my turn" Van Looy said.

Afterwards, Van Looy sporadically came into the spotlight. He continued to give the starting shot of the GP Rik Van Looy every year. And in, 2023 there were several events in Herentals around his 90th birthday.

Three days before his 91st birthday, Van Looy died on 17 December 2024 after an illness of several weeks.

== Legacy ==
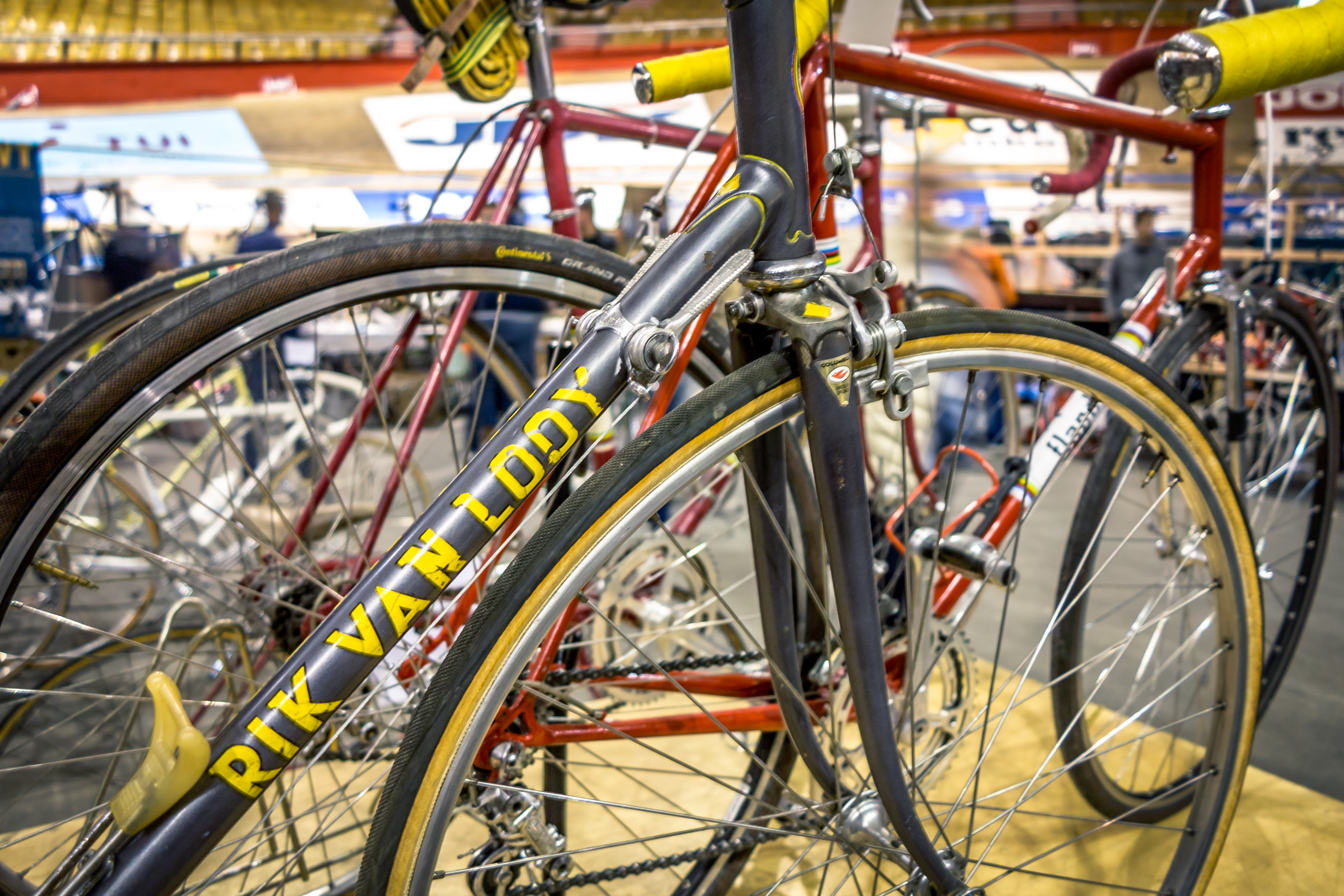
Bicycle used by Van Looy

Given the specialization of a cyclist's role in the modern peloton, Rik Van Looy's number of professional road race victories will most likely never be surpassed in the future.

Van Looy is also one of the most popular rider Belgium has ever known. His accessibility to supporters and direct style in interviews also contributed to his public image. He was often seen as more relatable than Eddy Merckx by some Belgian cycling fans. Even after Merckx's performances began to surpass those of Van Looy, Van Looy remained especially popular among sections of the Belgian public.

In addition, Van Looy had a "clean image", compared to many of his colleagues and the generations of cyclists that would follow. "My performances started to improve significantly after I started following the training schedules and diets of doctor Dries Claes, which I had to convince to start a collaboration. As he was outspokenly opposed to doping in sports, and even a member of the anti-doping commission, the use of banned substances was completely out of the question." Van Looy mentioned in a 2023 interview.

== Awards and honours ==
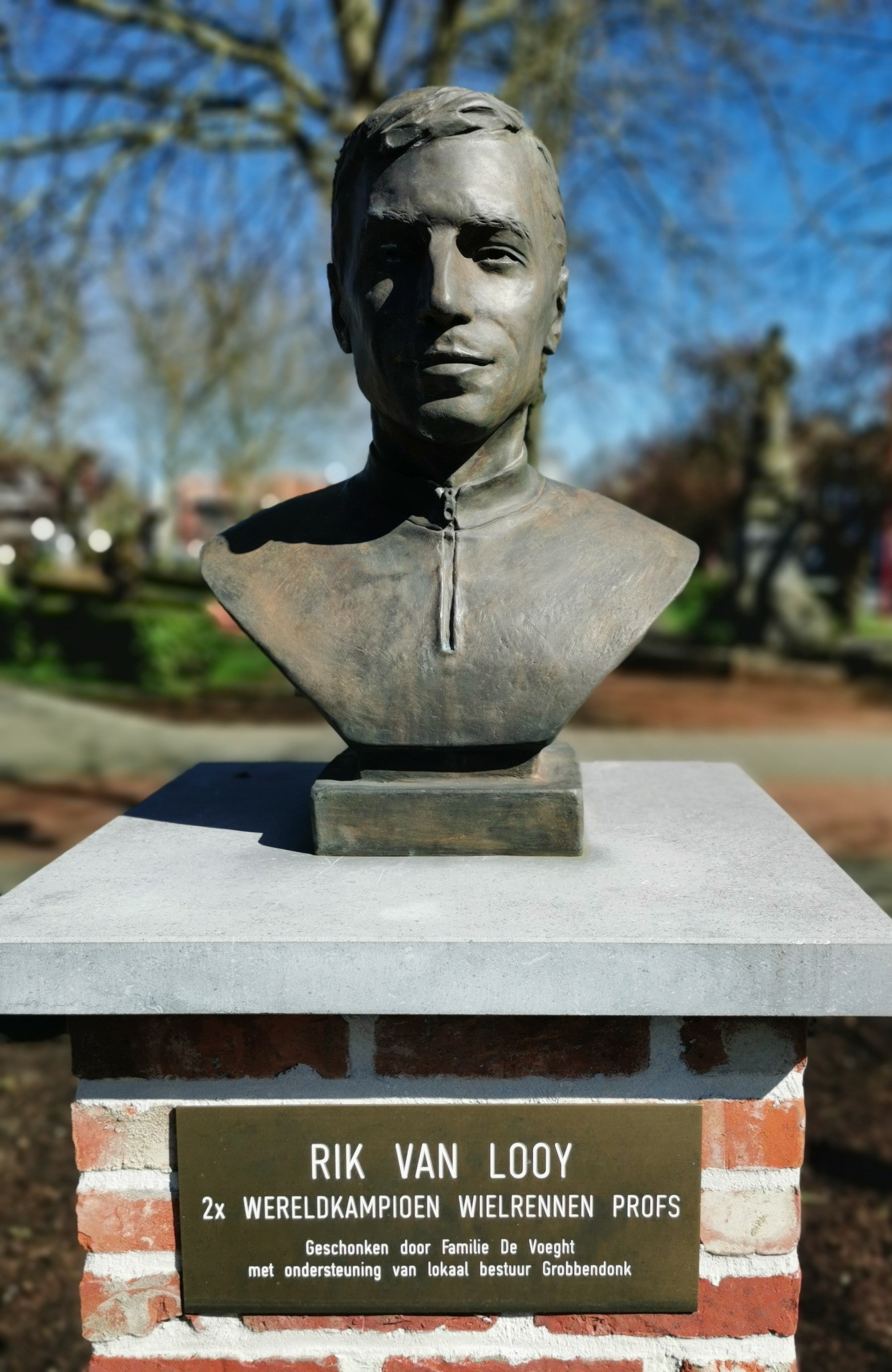
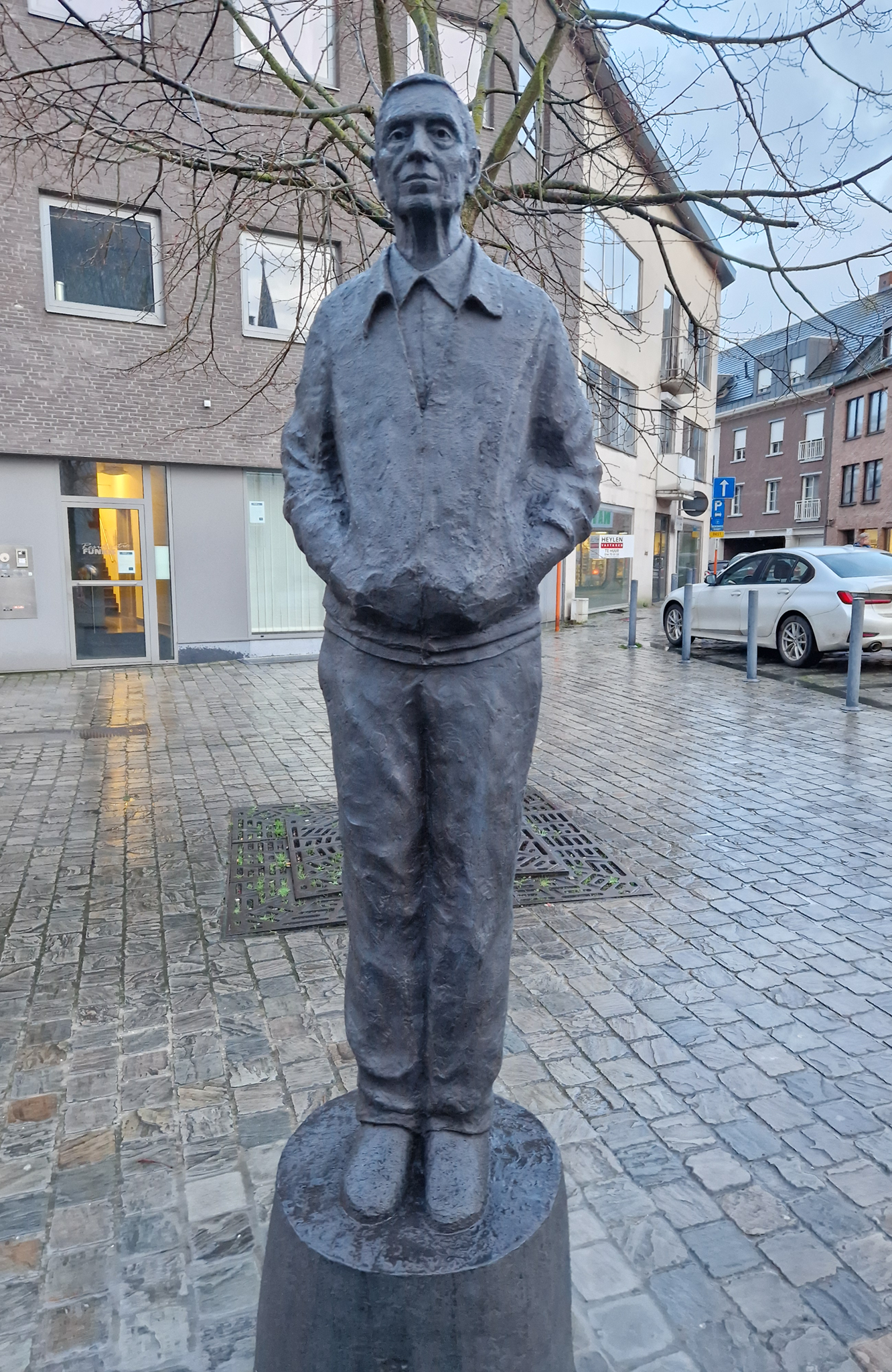
Bust of Van Looy in Grobbendonk and statue in Herentals
- Trophée Edmond Gentil: 1959
- Belgian National Sports Merit Award: 1961
- General Tour de France Combativity Award: 1963
- Stage Combativity Awards (8): 4 in 1963, 1 in 1962, 1964, 1965 & 1966
- Swiss AIOCC Trophy (fr): 1982
- UCI Hall of Fame: 2002
- Mémoire du Cyclisme – The Greatest Cyclists: 11th place: 2002
- Sports Personality of the Antwerp province: 2005
- Honorary citizen of Grobbendonk: 2012
- Statue in Herentals: 2017
- Grote Prijs Rik Van Looy: from 2018
- Bust in Grobbendonk: 2021
- Mural in KOERS Museum, Roeselare: 2023
- Exposition Van Looy 90 in Herentals: 2023
- Rik Van Looylaan, a street in Herentals: 2025
- ProcyclingStats – All Time Wins Ranking: 2nd place (162 wins)
- ProCyclingStats – All Time Ranking: 8th place
- CyclingRanking – Overall All Time Ranking: 12th place
- UCI Top 100: 16th place

Through his career, several vinyl singles about Van Looy were released by Belgian and Dutch artists.

=== Records ===
- The only cyclist to win all 8 original classics: the 5 Monuments plus Paris–Tours, Paris–Brussels and La Flèche Wallonne
- Winner of all 5 Monuments of Cycling (record shared with Eddy Merckx and Roger De Vlaeminck)
- Winner of all 3 cobbled classics in one season: 1962 (record shared with Tom Boonen)
- Former record of most races won by a professional cyclist: 367 (1961–1972)

== Major results ==
=== Road ===
1952
1st Team road race, Olympic Games
1st Road race, National Amateur Championships
1st Omloop der Vlaamse Gewesten Amateurs
2nd Brussels–Opwijk (fr)
1953 (1 pro win)
1st Road race, National Amateur Championships
1st Ronde van Midden-Nederland
1st Heistse Pijl
1st Omloop Het Volk U23
1st Stage 5 Tour of Austria
3rd Road race, UCI World Amateur Championships
7th Paris–Tours
1954 (2)
1st Roubaix–Huy
1st Stage 3a Driedaagse van Antwerpen
2nd Overall Tour of Belgium
4th Scheldeprijs
1955 (1)
1st Omloop van Oost-Vlaanderen
2nd Heistse Pijl
3rd Omloop van Midden-België
1956 (10)
1st Road race, National Interclubs Championships
1st Overall Ronde van Nederland

1st Stages 3, 4b (TTT) & 6

1st Overall Driedaagse van Antwerpen

1st Stages 2a

1st Gent–Wevelgem
1st Paris–Brussels
1st Scheldeprijs
1st De Drie Zustersteden
2nd Road race, UCI World Championships
2nd Nationale Sluitingsprijs
2nd Heistse Pijl
2nd Omloop van de Fruitstreek
5th Liège–Bastogne–Liège
8th Omloop Het Volk
1957 (12)
1st Overall Ronde van Nederland

1st Stages 2, 3a, 3b (TTT) & 6a

1st Gent–Wevelgem
1st Scheldeprijs
1st Coppa Bernocchi
1st Schaal Sels-Merksem
1st Omloop van Oost-Vlaanderen
1st GP Roeselare
1st Stage 6a Gran Premio Ciclomotoristico delle Nazioni
2nd Classica Sarda
2nd Omloop van Midden-België
3rd Omloop van het Houtland
4th Road race, UCI World Championships
4th Overall Driedaagse van Antwerpen

1st Stages 3a & 3b

4th Kampioenschap van Vlaanderen
5th Omloop Het Volk
6th Paris–Tours
7th Milano–Torino
1958 (16)
National Championships

1st Road race
1st Interclubs road race

1st Milan–San Remo
1st Coppa Bernocchi
1st Milano-Mantova
1st Paris–Brussels
1st GP Dr. Eugeen Roggeman
Vuelta a España

1st Stages 4, 5b, 6, 9 & 10
Held after Stages 9–11

Vuelta a Levante

1st Stages 1, 3 (TTT), 4 & 8

1st Stage 2 Tour of Belgium
2nd Overall Driedaagse van Antwerpen

1st Stage 2a

2nd Gent–Wevelgem
2nd Omloop Het Volk
3rd Overall Giro di Sardegna

1st Stage 3

3rd Paris–Roubaix
3rd Nationale Sluitingsprijs
4th Paris–Tours
4th Omloop van Oost-Vlaanderen
4th Omloop van het Houtland
5th Overall Ronde van Nederland
10th Liège–Bastogne–Liège
1959 (20)
1st Overall Giro di Sardegna

1st Stages 2, 4 & 6

1st Overall Vuelta a Levante

1st Points classification
1st Stages 2, 6, & 7

1st Tour of Flanders
1st Giro di Lombardia
1st Kampioenschap van Vlaanderen
1st Paris–Tours
1st Volta a la Comunitat Valenciana
1st GP Stad Vilvoorde
1st Tielt-Antwerpen-Tielt
3rd Overall Vuelta a España

1st Points classification
1st Stages 1b, 8, 9 & 11

3rd Overall Super Prestige Pernod
4th Overall Giro d'Italia

1st Stages 1, 5, 11 & 14
Held after Stage 1

4th Paris–Roubaix
5th Road race, National Championships
5th Scheldeprijs
5th Paris–Brussels
5th Critérium des As
9th Trofeo Baracchi (with Raymond Impanis)
1960 (10)
1st Road race, UCI World Championships
1st Ronde van Brabant
Giro d'Italia

1st Mountains classification
1st Stages 7b, 8 & 11

Paris–Nice

1st Points classification
1st Stage 2 (TTT), 5 & 8b

Giro di Sardegna

1st Stages 4 & 5

2nd Sassari-Cagliari
2nd Weekend ardennais
3rd Tour of Flanders
3rd Critérium des As
4th Road race, National Championships
4th Liège–Bastogne–Liège
5th Overall Driedaagse van Antwerpen

1st Stage 2a

6th Milan–San Remo
7th Paris–Brussels
8th La Flèche Wallonne
1961 (13)
1st Road race, UCI World Championships
1st Overall Tour of Belgium

1st Stages 4a (TTT) & 4b

1st Paris–Roubaix
1st Liège–Bastogne–Liège
1st Critérium des As
1st Bol d'Or des Monédières
1st Heusden Koers
2nd Milan–San Remo
3rd Overall Super Prestige Pernod
6th Overall Giro di Sardegna

1st Stages 2 & 6

7th Overall Giro d'Italia

1st Stages 13, 15 & 17

7th Overall Paris–Nice

1st Points classification
1st Stages 7 & 8

7th Paris–Brussels
1962 (11)
1st Overall Giro di Sardegna

1st Stages 3 & 5b

1st Paris–Roubaix
1st Tour of Flanders
1st Gent–Wevelgem
1st Textielprijs Vichte
1st Memorial Fred De Bruyne
1st Grand Prix du Parisien (TTT)
Giro d'Italia

1st Stages 9 & 11

Paris–Nice

1st Points classification
1st Stages 7a (TTT), 7b & 9b

1st Stage 2b (TTT) Tour de France
2nd Schelde-Dender-Leie
3rd Rund um den Henninger Turm
3rd Omloop van Oost-Vlaanderen
4th Overall Tour of Belgium

1st Points classification
1st Stages 3 & 4a (TTT)

6th Critérium des As
8th Liège–Bastogne–Liège
1963 (13)
1st Road race, National Championships
1st Boucles de l'Aulne
1st Omloop der Vlaamse Gewesten
Critérium du Dauphiné Libéré

1st Stages 2 & 5

2nd Road race, UCI World Championships
2nd Overall Giro di Sardegna

1st Stage 4

2nd Paris–Roubaix
3rd Overall Paris–Nice

1st Points classification
1st Stages 1, 4 & 8

3rd Critérium des As
6th Tour of Flanders
7th Brussels–Ingooigem
8th Gent–Wevelgem
10th Overall Tour de France

1st Points classification
1st Stages 2a, 8, 13 & 21
Combativity award

1964 (9)
1st Overall Paris–Luxembourg

1st Stage 1

1st Harelbeke–Antwerp–Harelbeke
1st Boucles de l'Aulne
1st Bruxelles–Meulebeke
1st Textielprijs Vichte
Vuelta a España

1st Stage 2
Held after Stages 2–5

1st Stage 4b Critérium du Dauphiné Libéré
1st Stage 4 Tour of Belgium
1st Stage 4 Giro di Sardegna
2nd Paris–Tours
2nd Paris–Brussels
2nd Kampioenschap van Vlaanderen
2nd Ronde van Brabant
3rd Gent–Wevelgem
4th Milan–San Remo
10th Tour of Flanders
1965 (27)
1st Overall Giro di Sardegna

1st Stages 1, 3, 4, 5 & 6

1st Harelbeke–Antwerp–Harelbeke
1st Paris–Roubaix
1st Circuit des XI Villes
1st Classica Sarda
1st Bruxelles–Meulebeke
1st Flèche Enghiennoise
1st GP Ninove
1st Heusden Koers
Tour de France

1st Stages 1a & 19
Held after Stages 1a & 1b

1st Stage 4b Circuit du Provençal
1st Stage 2a Tour of Belgium
3rd Overall Vuelta a España

1st Points classification
1st Stages 1, 2, 7, 9, 12, 14, 15 & 17
Held after Stages 1–3

6th Tour of Flanders
10th Overall Tour de Luxembourg

1st Stages 1, 2b & 4

1966 (5)
1st Harelbeke–Antwerp–Harelbeke
1st Omloop van de Fruitstreek
1st Stage 4 Paris–Nice
1st Stage 2 Tour of Belgium
2nd Paris–Tours
2nd Omloop van Midden-België
3rd Paris–Brussels
4th Flèche Enghiennoise
5th Overall Tour de Luxembourg

1st Stage 3

9th Paris–Roubaix
1967 (4)
1st Paris–Tours
1st Omloop van de Fruitstreek
1st GP Briek Schotte
1st Stage 5 Tour de France
1st Stage 2 Giro di Sardegna
2nd Paris–Roubaix
2nd Omloop van het Houtland
2nd Flèche Enghiennoise
2nd Wezembeek-Oppem
4th Kampioenschap van Vlaanderen
6th Overall Paris–Nice

1st Stage 4

6th Harelbeke–Antwerp–Harelbeke
9th Schaal Sels-Merksem
10th Overall Tour of Belgium

1st Points classification

1968 (1)
1st La Flèche Wallonne
1st Seraing–Aachen–Seraing
2nd Flèche Enghiennoise
3rd Kampioenschap van Vlaanderen
3rd Halle–Ingooigem
4th Paris–Tours
6th Tour du Condroz
8th Gent–Wevelgem
10th Overall Tour of Belgium
10th Milan–San Remo
10th Tour of Flanders
1969 (4)
1st Harelbeke–Antwerp–Harelbeke
1st Omloop van de Grensstreek
1st Omloop der Zennevallei
1st Heistse Pijl
1st GP Briek Schotte
1st Stage 4 Tour de France
5th Grote Prijs Jef Scherens
8th De Kustpijl
9th Overall Tour de Luxembourg
9th Flèche Enghiennoise
10th Gent–Wevelgem
10th Omloop van de Fruitstreek
1970
1st Kessel–Lier

==== Grand Tour general classification results timeline ====
Grand Tour	1953	1954	1955	1956	1957	1958	1959	1960	1961	1962	1963	1964	1965	1966	1967	1968	1969	1970
Vuelta a España	Not held		—	—	—	DNF	3	—	—	—	—	DNF	3	—	—	—	—	—
Giro d'Italia	—	—	DNF	—	—	—	4	11	7	DNF	DNF	—	—	—	DNF	—	—	—
Tour de France	—	—	—	—	—	—	—	—	—	DNF	10	DNF	31	DNF	DNF	—	DNF	—

==== Classics results timeline ====
Monument	1953	1954	1955	1956	1957	1958	1959	1960	1961	1962	1963	1964	1965	1966	1967	1968	1969	1970
Milan–San Remo	—	—	—	52	74	1	35	6	2	14	71	4	41	—	12	10	82	DNF
Tour of Flanders	—	—	—	11	17	—	1	3	—	1	6	10	6	16	26	10	—	DNF
Paris–Roubaix	—	11	—	11	—	3	4	—	1	1	2	16	1	9	2	—	22	DNF
Liège–Bastogne–Liège	—	—	—	5	—	10	—	4	1	8	—	—	—	—	—	—	—	—
Giro di Lombardia	—	—	—	DSQ	—	27	1	11	—	—	—	—	—	—	—	—	—	—
Classic	1953	1954	1955	1956	1957	1958	1959	1960	1961	1962	1963	1964	1965	1966	1967	1968	1969	1970
Omloop Het Volk	—	36	—	8	5	2	—	NH	—	—	—	—	—	20	—	—	—	42
Amstel Gold Race	Did not exist													—	15	25	—	—
Gent–Wevelgem	—	—	—	1	1	2	12	—	61	1	8	3	15	22	34	8	10	DNF
La Flèche Wallonne	—	44	53	—	—	13	—	8	43	26	—	—	—	11	15	1	23	—
Paris–Brussels	—	20	—	1	42	1	5	7	7	—	—	2	34	3	Not held			
Paris–Tours	7	—	—	43	6	4	1	81	—	—	—	2	—	2	1	4	45	—

==== Major championships results timeline ====
	1953	1954	1955	1956	1957	1958	1959	1960	1961	1962	1963	1964	1965	1966	1967	1968	1969	1970
World Championships	—	DNF	—	2	4	DNF	38	1	1	30	2	32	DNF	—	—	15	24	—
National Championships	—	—	32	—	—	1	5	4	—	—	1	—	—	17	—	13	7	DNF

Legend
—	Did not compete
DNF	Did not finish

=== Track ===
1953
1st Omnium of Antwerp
1st Omnium of Antwerp
1st Omnium of Antwerp
1956
1st Omnium of Rocourt
1st Omnium of Brussels
3rd Six Days of Brussels (with Lucien Acou)
1957
1st Six Days of Brussels (with Willy Vannitsen)
1st Omnium of Antwerp
1st Omnium of Brussels
1st Omnium of Gent
1st Omnium of Gent
1958
1st Six Days of Ghent (with Reginald Arnold)
1st Omnium of Milan
1st Omnium of Gent
1st Omnium of Brussels
1st Omnium of Zürich
1959
1st Omnium of Gent
1st Omnium of Paris
1st Omnium of Brussels
1st Omnium of Gent
1st Omnium of Rocourt
1st Omnium of Brussels
1st Omnium of Gent
1960
1st Six Days of Berlin (with Peter Post)
1st Six Days of Ghent (with Peter Post)
1st Omnium of Brussels
2nd Six Days of Brussels (with Peter Post)
2nd Six Days of Frankfurt (with Peter Post)
1961
1st Six Days of Antwerp (with Willy Vannitsen & Peter Post)
1st Six Days of Cologne (with Peter Post)
1st Six Days of Brussels (with Peter Post)
1st Six Days of Ghent (with Peter Post)
1st Omnium of Brussels
National Championships

2nd Madison (with Edgard Sorgeloos)
2nd Omnium

2nd Six Days of Berlin (with Peter Post)
2nd Six Days of Frankfurt (with Peter Post)
3rd Six Days of Zürich (with Peter Post)
1962
1st Six Days of Antwerp (with Oscar Plattner & Peter Post)
1st Six Days of Berlin (with Peter Post)
1st Six Days of Dortmund (with Peter Post)
European Championships

2nd Madison (with Peter Post)
3rd Derny

2nd Six Days of Berlin (with Peter Post)
3rd Six Days of Milan (with Peter Post)
1963
2nd Six Days of Berlin (with Rik van Steenbergen)
3rd Six Days of Zürich (with Rik van Steenbergen)
1964
1st Omnium of Rocourt
1st Omnium of Ostend
1965
1st Omnium of Ostend
1st Omnium of Ostend
1st Omnium of Rocourt
1st Omnium of Ostend
1st Omnium of Valenciennes
1st Omnium of Brussels
1968
1st Madison (with Patrick Sercu), National Championships
1st Omnium of Gent (with Patrick Sercu)
1st Omnium of Gent (with Julien Stevens)
1st Omnium of Gent
2nd Six Days of Ghent (with Patrick Sercu)
2nd Six Days of Antwerp (with Fritz Pfenninger & Peter Post)
1969
1st Madison (with Patrick Sercu), National Championships
1st Six Days of Antwerp (with Peter Post & Patrick Sercu)
1970
3rd Six Days of Antwerp (with Sigi Renz & Theo Verschueren)

== Books ==
- Pedalare! The Emperor: The Rik Van Looy Story by David Armstrong in 1971, Kennedy Brothers, 34 p. (English) ASIN B0006C6X94
- The Beast, The Emperor and the Milkman by Harry Pearson in 2019, Bloomsbury Publishing, 289 p. (English) ISBN 9781472945068
- Rik Van Looy: De Temperamentvolle Wereldkampioen by Marcel Grosjean & Roger Meuleman in 1960. G.P.V., 40 p. (Dutch)
- Rik Van Looy by Fred De Bruyne in 1963. 42 p. (Dutch)
- Rik Van Looy: Heerser en Verdeler by Louis Clicteur & Lucien Berghmans in 1966, De Steenbok, 222 p. (Dutch)
- Ik, Rik! by Rik van Looy & Rob Jans in 1972, Brito, 95 p. (Dutch)
- Van Looy Story by André Blancke, Jan Cornand & Roger Quick in 1979, Het Volk, 69 p. (Dutch)
- Zonde van Nini by Stef Vancaenegem in 1987, Manteau, 120 p. (Dutch)
- Rik Van Looy: Monument Voor Een Keizer by Roger De Maertelaere, Guy Crasset & Modest Maertens in 2005. De Eecloonaar, 192 p. (Dutch, French) ISBN 9789077562185
- Flandria: de 20 Wondere Jaren van een Wielerploeg by Mark van Hamme in 2007, De Eecloonaar, 392 p. ISBN 9789077562338
- Groene Leeuw: de Wielerploeg die de Keizer Uitdaagde by Jan De Smet and Patrick Feyaerts in 2008, De Eecloonaar, 360 p. ISBN 9789077562512
- Rik Van Looy 80 by Mark Vanlombeek & Robert Janssens in 2013. Borgerhoff & Lamberigts, 272 p. (Dutch, French) ISBN 9789089313997
- Van Looy / Les Héros! by Robert Janssens in 2018. Kannibaal Books, 120 p. (Dutch, French) ISBN 9789492677402
- Rik Van Looy - De Val van een (Wieler)Keizer. 1963 & 1964 Anni Horribiles by Jan De Smet and Patrick Feyaerts, De Eecloonaar, 210 p. (Dutch)
- ’t Is Rik – Hommage aan de Keizer by Bart Lamers en Thijs Delrue in 2021 (Dutch, French) ISBN 9798201045227
