= Omloop van Oost-Vlaanderen =

Recurring sporting event

Race details
- Date: May, June
- Region: Flanders, Belgium
- English name: Circuit of East Flanders
- Local name(s): Omloop van Oost-Vlaanderen (Dutch)
- Discipline: Road
- Type: One-day

History
- First edition: 1945
- Editions: 35
- Final edition: 1979
- First winner: Achiel De Backer (BEL)
- Most wins: Achiel De Backer (BEL); Rik Van Looy (BEL) (2 wins)
- Final winner: Daniel Willems (BEL)

The Omloop van Oost-Vlaanderen was a post WW II-men's cycling race organized for the last time in 1979. The start and finish place was Ertvelde (East Flanders, Belgium).

The competition's roll of honor includes the successes of Rik Van Looy, Walter Godefroot and Herman Van Springel.

== Winners ==
Year	Winner	Second	Third
1945	(Belgium) Achiel De Backer	(Belgium) Marcel Ryckaert	(Belgium) René Adriaensens
1946	(Belgium) Achiel De Backer	(Belgium) Omer Van Geystelen	(Belgium) Robert Van Eenaeme
1947	(Belgium) Roger De Corte	(Belgium) Achiel Buysse	(Belgium) André Maelbrancke
1948	(Netherlands) Théo Middelkamp	(Belgium) Michel Remue	(Belgium) Arsène Rijckaert
1949	(Belgium) Georges Claes	(Belgium) Roger Decorte	(Belgium) Achiel Schepens
1950	(Belgium) Hector Smet	(Belgium) Lode Poels	(Belgium) August Van Mirlo
1951	(Belgium) Lucien Deporteer	(Belgium) Emmanuel Thoma	(Belgium) Jean Bogaerts
1952	(Belgium) Arsène Rijckaert	(Belgium) Roger Gyselinck	(Netherlands) Piet Van As
1953	(Belgium) Hilaire Couvreur	(Belgium) Marcel Ryckaert	(Belgium) Roger Desmet
1954	(Belgium) Alfred De Bruyne	(Belgium) Roger Decock	(Belgium) Henri Van Kerkhove
1955	(Belgium) Rik Van Looy	(Belgium) Alfred De Bruyne	(Belgium) Gaston De Wacher
1956	(Belgium) Gilbert Desmet	(Belgium) Roger Decock	(Belgium) André Rosseel
1957	(Belgium) Rik Van Looy	(Belgium) André Noyelle	(Belgium) Jos De Feyter
1958	(Netherlands) Joseph Theuns	(Belgium) Gustaaf Van Vaerenbergh	(Belgium) Karel Clerckx
1959	(Belgium) Roger Decock	(Belgium) Jules Mertens	(Belgium) Peter Van Der Plaetsen
1960	(Belgium) Willy Haelterman	(Belgium) Léopold Rosseel	(Belgium) André Noyelle
1961	(Belgium) André Noyelle	(Netherlands) Michel Van Aerde	(Belgium) Maurice Meuleman
1962	(Belgium) Gabriel Borra	(Belgium) Benoni Beheyt	(Belgium) Rik Van Looy
1963	(Netherlands) Piet Van Est	(Netherlands) Jan Janssen	(Belgium) Roger De Breucker
1964	(Belgium) Willy Raes	(Belgium) Edward Sels	(Belgium) Constant Schreel
1965	(Netherlands) Léo Van Drongen	(Belgium) Hugo De Thaey	(Belgium) Julien Haelterman
1966	(Belgium) Joseph Mathy	(Belgium) Donaat Himpe	(Belgium) Bernard Vandekerkhove
1967	(Belgium) Noel Fore	(Belgium) Roger Rosiers	(Belgium) Willy Van Neste
1968	(Belgium) Léopold Van Den Neste	(Belgium) Frans Brands	(Belgium) Albert Van Vlierberghe
1969	(Belgium) Daniel Van Ryckeghem	(Belgium) Ludo Van Dromme	(Belgium) Ronny Van De Vijver
1970	(Belgium) Etienne Buysse	(Belgium) Joseph Schoeters	(Belgium) Willy Scheers
1971	(Belgium) Frans Melckenbeeck	(Belgium) Maurice Dury	(Netherlands) Mats Gerritsen
1972	(Belgium) Noël Van Clooster	(Netherlands) Richard Buckaki	(Belgium) Roger Loysch
1973	(Belgium) Walter Godefroot	(Belgium) Frans Van Looy	(Belgium) Freddy Maertens
1974	(Belgium) Daniel Verplancke	(Belgium) Willem Peeters	(Belgium) Freddy Maertens
1975	(Belgium) Herman Van Springel	(Belgium) Julien Stevens	(Belgium) Daniel Verplancke
1976	(Belgium) Ferdi Van Den Haute	(Belgium) Albert Van Vlierberghe	(Belgium) André Delcroix
1977	(Netherlands) Piet Van Katwijk	(Belgium) Emiel Gijsemans	(Belgium) Rudy Pevenage
1978	(Belgium) Guido Van Calster	(Belgium) Jozef Van De Poel	(Belgium) Eddy Verstraeten
1979	(Belgium) Daniel Willems	(Netherlands) Piet Van Katwijk	(Belgium) Etienne De Beule
