= 1961 Paris–Roubaix =

Race details
- Dates: 9 April 1961
- Stages: 1
- Distance: 263 km (163.4 mi)
- Winning time: 6h 19' 08"

Results
	Winner	Rik Van Looy (BEL)	(Faema)
	Second	Marcel Janssens (BEL)	(Dr. Mann)
	Third	René Vanderveken (BEL)	(Solo–Van Steenbergen)

The 1961 Paris–Roubaix was the 59th edition of the Paris–Roubaix cycle race and was held on 9 April 1961. The race started in Compiègne and finished in Roubaix. The race was won by Rik Van Looy of the Faema team.

== General classification ==
Final general classification

Rank	Rider	Team	Time
1	Rik Van Looy (BEL)	Faema	6h 19' 08"
2	Marcel Janssens (BEL)	Dr. Mann	+ 0"
3	René Vanderveken (BEL)	Solo–Van Steenbergen	+ 0"
4	Norbert Kerckhove (BEL)	Dr. Mann	+ 0"
5	Albertus Geldermans (NED)	Rapha–Gitane–Dunlop	+ 0"
6	Emile Daems (BEL)	Philco	+ 0"
7	Bas Maliepaard (NED)	Rapha–Gitane–Dunlop	+ 50"
8	Armand Desmet (BEL)	Faema	+ 50"
9	Arthur Decabooter (BEL)	Groene Leeuw–SAS–Sinalco	+ 1' 05"
10	Gilbert Desmet (BEL)	Carpano	+ 1' 05"
