= 1962 Tour of Flanders =

46th Tour of Flanders
Race details
- Dates: 1 April 1962
- Stages: 1
- Distance: 254 km (157.8 mi)
- Winning time: 6h 39' 00"

Results
	Winner	Rik Van Looy (BEL)	(Flandria–Faema–Clement)
	Second	Michel Van Aerde (BEL)	(Carpano)
	Third	Norbert Kerckhove (BEL)	(Dr.Mann)

The 46th Tour of Flanders cycling classic was held on Sunday, 1 April 1962. It was won by Belgian Rik Van Looy after an ultimate solo attack in Wetteren. 48 of 151 riders finished.

== Route ==
The race started in Ghent and finished in Gentbrugge for the first time – covering 254 km. The finish was on the Emile Verhaerenlaan, where riders had to finish an additional 2.3 km lap. There were six categorized climbs:

- Kwaremont
- Kruisberg
- Edelareberg
- Valkenberg
- Kasteelstraat
- Grotenberge

== Results ==
Result
Rank	Rider	Team	Time
1	Rik Van Looy (BEL)	Flandria–Faema–Clement	6h 39' 00"
2	Michel Van Aerde (BEL)	Carpano	+ 9"
3	Norbert Kerckhove (BEL)	Dr.Mann	s.t.
4	Noël Foré (BEL)	Flandria–Faema–Clement	s.t.
5	Tom Simpson (GBR)	Gitane–Leroux	s.t.
6	Jef Planckaert (BEL)	Flandria–Faema–Clement	+ 12"
7	Willy Vannitsen (BEL)	Wiels–Groene Leeuw	+ 4' 08"
8	Mies Stolker (NED)	Saint Raphael–Helyett–Hutchinson	s.t.
9	Edgard Sorgeloos (BEL)	Flandria–Faema–Clement	s.t.
10	Jos Wouters (BEL)	Solo–Van Steenbergen	+ 4' 25"
