= 1958 Omloop Het Volk =

Race details
- Dates: 7 April 1958
- Stages: 1
- Distance: 203 km (126 mi)
- Winning time: 5h 26' 48"

Results
	Winner	Jef Planckaert (BEL)
	Second	Rik Van Looy (BEL)
	Third	Roger de Corte (BEL)

The 1958 Omloop Het Volk was the 14th edition of the Omloop Het Volk cycle race and was held on 7 April 1958. The race started and finished in Ghent. The race was won by Jef Planckaert.

== General classification ==
Final general classification
Rank	Rider	Time
1	Jef Planckaert (BEL)	5h 26' 48"
2	Rik Van Looy (BEL)	+ 55"
3	Roger de Corte (BEL)	+ 55"
4	Martin Van Geneugden (BEL)	+ 55"
5	Noël Foré (BEL)	+ 55"
6	Jan van Gompel (BEL)	+ 55"
7	Pino Cerami (BEL)	+ 55"
8	Norbert Kerckhove (BEL)	+ 55"
9	Georges Decraye (BEL)	+ 55"
10	Jos Hinsen (BEL)	+ 55"
