= 1961 Harelbeke–Antwerp–Harelbeke =

Race details
- Dates: 11 March 1961
- Stages: 1
- Distance: 202 km (126 mi)
- Winning time: 5h 05' 00"

Results
	Winner	Arthur Decabooter (BEL)
	Second	Frans Aerenhouts (BEL)
	Third	André Noyelle (BEL)

The 1961 Harelbeke–Antwerp–Harelbeke (Note: The race was known as Harelbeke–Antwerp–Harelbeke (French: Harelbeke–Anvers–Harelbeke) for the first twelve editions. In 1970, the race became known as the E3, after the Belgian road which is now known as the E17.) was the fourth edition of the E3 Harelbeke cycle race and was held on 11 March 1961. The race started and finished in Harelbeke. The race was won by Arthur Decabooter.

== General classification ==
Final general classification

Rank	Rider	Time
1	Arthur Decabooter (BEL)	5h 05' 00"
2	Frans Aerenhouts (BEL)	+ 0"
3	André Noyelle (BEL)	+ 0"
4	Leopold Schaeken (BEL)	+ 0"
5	Leopold Rosseel (BEL)	+ 0"
6	Jan Van Gompel (BEL)	+ 0"
7	Jacques Rebiffe (FRA)	+ 0"
8	Arnould Flécy (BEL)	+ 0"
9	Aimé Van Avermaet (BEL)	+ 0"
10	Georges Decraeye (BEL)	+ 0"
