= 1966 Paris–Roubaix =

Race details
- Dates: 17 April 1966
- Stages: 1
- Distance: 262.5 km (163.1 mi)
- Winning time: 6h 59' 26"

Results
	Winner	Felice Gimondi (ITA)	(Salvarani)
	Second	Jan Janssen (NED)	(Pelforth–Sauvage–Lejeune)
	Third	Gustaaf De Smet (BEL)	(Wiel's–Gancia-Groene Leeuw)

The 1966 Paris–Roubaix was the 64th edition of the Paris–Roubaix cycle race and was held on 17 April 1966. The race started in Compiègne and finished in Roubaix.

The 262.5 kilometres (163.1 mi) course included the 1.1 kilometres (0.68 mi) cobbled Pas Roland climb up to Mons-en-Pévèle, with an average gradient of 4% and a maximum gradient of 8%. The race was won by Italian rider Felice Gimondi of the Salvarani team, who attacked on the Pas Roland climb before soloing to the finish in Roubaix. The Pas Roland climb was subsequently paved with asphalt before the 1967 edition of the race.

== General classification ==
Final general classification

Rank	Rider	Team	Time
1	Felice Gimondi (ITA)	Salvarani	6h 59' 26"
2	Jan Janssen (NED)	Pelforth–Sauvage–Lejeune	+ 4' 08"
3	Gustaaf De Smet (BEL)	Wiel's–Gancia-Groene Leeuw	+ 4' 08"
4	Willy Planckaert (BEL)	Roméo–Smith's	+ 4' 08"
5	Jos Huysmans (BEL)	Dr. Mann–Grundig	+ 4' 08"
6	Rudi Altig (FRG)	Molteni	+ 4' 08"
7	Willy Bocklant (BEL)	Dr. Mann–Grundig	+ 4' 08"
8	Arthur Decabooter (BEL)	Wiel's–Gancia-Groene Leeuw	+ 4' 08"
9	Rik Van Looy (BEL)	Solo–Superia	+ 4' 08"
10	Gerben Karstens (NED)	Televizier–Batavus	+ 4' 08"
