= 1962 Gent–Wevelgem =

Race details
- Dates: 25 March 1962
- Stages: 1
- Distance: 237 km (147 mi)
- Winning time: 5h 55' 04"

Results
	Winner	Rik Van Looy (BEL)	(Flandria–Faema–Clément)
	Second	Frans Schoubben (BEL)	(Peugeot–BP–Dunlop)
	Third	Armand Desmet (BEL)	(Flandria–Faema–Clément)

The 1962 Gent–Wevelgem was the 24th edition of the Belgian Gent–Wevelgem cycle race and was held on 25 March 1962. The race started in Ghent and finished in Wevelgem. The race was won by Rik Van Looy of the Flandria team.

== General classification ==
Final general classification

Rank	Rider	Team	Time
1	Rik Van Looy (BEL)	Flandria–Faema–Clément	5h 55' 04"
2	Frans Schoubben (BEL)	Peugeot–BP–Dunlop	+ 1' 29"
3	Armand Desmet (BEL)	Flandria–Faema–Clément	+ 1' 29"
4	Michel Van Aerde (BEL)	Carpano	+ 1' 29"
5	Arthur Decabooter (BEL)	Liberia–Grammont–Wolber	+ 4' 30"
6	Tom Simpson (GBR)	Gitane–Leroux–Dunlop–R. Geminiani	+ 4' 30"
7	Willy Vannitsen (BEL)	Wiel's–Groene Leeuw	+ 4' 30"
8	Martin Van Geneugden (BEL)	Flandria–Faema–Clément	+ 4' 30"
9	Jean-Baptiste Claes (BEL)	Wiel's–Groene Leeuw	+ 4' 30"
10	Bas Maliepaard (NED)	Gitane–Leroux–Dunlop–R. Geminiani	+ 4' 30"
