= 1958 Gent–Wevelgem =

Race details
- Dates: 6 April 1958
- Stages: 1
- Distance: 231 km (144 mi)
- Winning time: 5h 33' 11"

Results
	Winner	Noël Foré (BEL)
	Second	Rik Van Looy (BEL)
	Third	Fred De Bruyne (BEL)

The 1958 Gent–Wevelgem was the 20th edition of the Belgian Gent–Wevelgem cycle race and was held on 6 April 1958. The race started in Ghent and finished in Wevelgem. The race was won by Noël Foré.

== General classification ==
Final general classification

Rank	Rider	Time
1	Noël Foré (BEL)	5h 33' 11"
2	Rik Van Looy (BEL)	+ 1' 25"
3	Fred De Bruyne (BEL)	+ 1' 25"
4	Rik Luyten (BEL)	+ 1' 25"
5	Frans Schoubben (BEL)	+ 1' 25"
6	Pino Cerami (BEL)	+ 1' 25"
7	Seamus Elliott (IRL)	+ 1' 25"
8	Jules Mertens (BEL)	+ 1' 25"
9	Willy Schroeders (BEL)	+ 1' 25"
10	André Noyelle (BEL)	+ 1' 25"
