= 1959 La Flèche Wallonne =

Race details
- Dates: 25 April 1959
- Stages: 1
- Distance: 218 km (135.5 mi)
- Winning time: 5h 58' 07"

Results
	Winner	Jos Hoevenaers (BEL)
	Second	Marcel Janssens (BEL)
	Third	Frans Schoubben (BEL)

The 1959 La Flèche Wallonne was the 23rd edition of La Flèche Wallonne cycle race and was held on 25 April 1959. The race started in Charleroi and finished in Liège. The race was won by Jos Hoevenaers.

== General classification ==
Final general classification

Rank	Rider	Time
1	Jos Hoevenaers (BEL)	5h 58' 07"
2	Marcel Janssens (BEL)	+ 15"
3	Frans Schoubben (BEL)	+ 15"
4	Armand Desmet (BEL)	+ 15"
5	Gilbert Desmet (BEL)	+ 15"
6	Agostino Coletto (ITA)	+ 18"
7	Frans De Mulder (BEL)	+ 38"
8	Léopold Rosseel (BEL)	+ 38"
9	Norbert Kerckhove (BEL)	+ 38"
10	Noël Foré (BEL)	+ 38"
