= Driedaagse van Antwerpen =

Belgian cycling race

Race details
- Date: April, June, August
- Region: Flanders, Belgium
- English name: Three Days of Antwerp
- Local name(s): Driedaagse van Antwerpen (in Dutch), Trois jours d'Anvers (in French)
- Discipline: Road
- Competition: Cat. 1.2
- Type: Stage race

History
- First edition: 1954
- Editions: 6
- Final edition: 1960
- First winner: Wim Van Est (NED)
- Final winner: Eddy Pauwels (BEL)

The Driedaagse van Antwerpen was a short-lived Belgian stage cycling race organized for the last time in 1960.

The course was situated in the Antwerp Province. It also included a team time trial, which was held in the city park (Stadspark) of Antwerp.

Rik Van Looy won at least one stage in each edition, except for 1955.

== Winners ==
Year	Winner	Second	Third
1954	(Netherlands) Wim Van Est	(Italy) Guido De Santi	(Switzerland) Hugo Koblet
Stage winners	(Switzerland) Hugo Koblet (ITT) (Belgium) Germain Derycke (Belgium) Karel Borgmans Netherlands (TP) (Belgium) Rik Van Looy (Switzerland) Hugo Koblet		
1955	(Belgium) Germain Derycke	(Belgium) René Mertens	(Belgium) André Vlayen
Stage winners	(Belgium) André Noyelle (Belgium) Elvé-Peugeot (TTT) (France) André Darrigade (Belgium) Jean Brankart (France) Bernard Gauthier		
1956	(Belgium) Rik Van Looy	(Belgium) Raymond Impanis	(Netherlands) Wim Van Est
Stage winners	(Belgium) Willy Vannitsen (Belgium) Rik Van Looy (Belgium) Van Hauwaert (TTT) (Netherlands) Wim Van Est (Belgium) Willy Truye		
1957	(Belgium) Léon Van Daele	(Belgium) Gilbert Desmet	(Belgium) Jozef Planckaert
Stage winners	(Belgium) Léon Van Daele (Belgium) Jean Brankart (ITT) (Belgium) Rik Van Steenbergen (Belgium) Rik Van Looy (Belgium) Rik Van Looy		
1958	(Belgium) André Vlayen	(Belgium) Rik Van Looy	(Belgium) Frans Arenhouts
Stage winners	(Belgium) Dr. Mann (TTT) (Spain) Miguel Poblet (Belgium) Rik Van Looy (Belgium) André Vlayen (Belgium) Jozef Schils		
1959	Not held		
1960	(Belgium) Eddy Pauwels	(Germany) Rolf Wolfshohl	(Belgium) Lode Troonbeeckx
Stage winners	(Belgium) Joseph Hoevanaers & (Spain) Luis Otaño (France) Saint-Raphaël (TTT) (Belgium) Rik Van Looy (Belgium) Dr. Mann (TTT) (Belgium) Willy Butzen		
