= 1957 Gent–Wevelgem =

Race details
- Dates: 23 March 1957
- Stages: 1
- Distance: 207 km (129 mi)
- Winning time: 5h 09' 24"

Results
	Winner	Rik Van Looy (BEL)
	Second	André Noyelle (BEL)
	Third	Lucien Mathys (BEL)

The 1957 Gent–Wevelgem was the 19th edition of the Belgian Gent–Wevelgem cycle race and was held on 23 March 1957. The race started in Ghent and finished in Wevelgem. The race was won by Rik Van Looy.

== General classification ==
Final general classification

Rank	Rider	Time
1	Rik Van Looy (BEL)	5h 09' 24"
2	André Noyelle (BEL)	+ 0"
3	Lucien Mathys (BEL)	+ 0"
4	Ernest Heyvaert (BEL)	+ 0"
5	Jef Planckaert (BEL)	+ 0"
6	Norbert Kerckhove (BEL)	+ 0"
7	Willy Schroeders (BEL)	+ 0"
8	Julien Schepens (BEL)	+ 50"
9	Jozef Schils (BEL)	+ 50"
10	Leon Vandaele (BEL)	+ 50"
