= Frans Schoubben =

Belgian cyclist

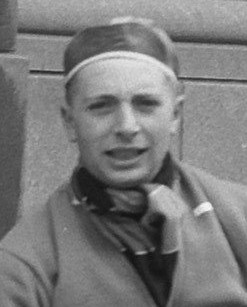
- Frans Schoubben (1955)

Personal information
- Born: 11 November 1933 Tongeren, Belgium
- Died: 31 July 1997 (aged 63) Tongeren, Belgium

Cycling career
- Sport: Cycling
- Role: Rider

Frans Schoubben (11 November 1933 – 31 July 1997) was a Belgian racing cyclist. He was declared the joint winner of the 1957 Liège–Bastogne–Liège, along with Germain Derycke.

== Major results ==
1956
1st Ronde van Limburg
1st Stage 2 Tour of Belgium
2nd Road race, National Road Championships
2nd Dwars door Vlaanderen
1957
1st Liège-Bastogne-Liège
1st Hoeilaart-Diest-Hoeilaart
1st Antwerpen-Ougrée
1st Weekend Ardennais
1st Stage 2 4 Jours de Dunkerque
2nd GP du Midi-Libre
8th Tour of Flanders
1958
1st Antwerpen-Ougrée
4th Overall Tour of Belgium
5th Gent-Wevelgem
8th Bordeaux-Paris
10th Milan–San Remo
1959
Tour de l'Ouest

1st Stages 1 & 9

1st Paris–Brussels
1st Weekend Ardennais
1st Stage 3 4 Jours de Dunkerque
2nd Tour of Flanders
2nd Liège-Bastogne-Liège
3rd La Flèche Wallonne
1960
9th Tour of Flanders
9th Gent-Wevelgem
10th Milan–San Remo
10th Antwerpen-Ougrée
1961
1st GP Stad Zottegem
1st Stage 5 Tour de Champagne
2nd Omloop Het Volk
3rd Paris–Brussels
4th Overall GP du Midi-Libre
10th Tour of Flanders
1962
1st Stage 4b Tour of Belgium
2nd Gent-Wevelgem
2nd GP Victor Standaert
3rd Paris-Roubaix
6th Paris–Brussels
9th Liège-Bastogne-Liège
10th Antwerpen-Ougrée
1963
2nd Hoeilaart-Diest-Hoeilaart
6th Liège-Bastogne-Liège
