= 1963 Gent–Wevelgem =

- Official poster of the event

Race details
- Dates: 24 March 1963
- Stages: 1
- Distance: 230 km (140 mi)
- Winning time: 5h 51' 20"

Results
	Winner	Benoni Beheyt (BEL)	(Wiel's–Groene Leeuw)
	Second	Tom Simpson (GBR)	(Peugeot–BP–Englebert)
	Third	Michel Van Aerde (BEL)	(Solo–Terrot)

The 1963 Gent–Wevelgem was the 25th edition of the Belgian Gent–Wevelgem cycle race and was held on 24 March 1963. The race started in Ghent and finished in Wevelgem. The race was won by Benoni Beheyt of the Groene Leeuw team.

== General classification ==
Final general classification

Rank	Rider	Team	Time
1	Benoni Beheyt (BEL)	Wiel's–Groene Leeuw	5h 51' 20"
2	Tom Simpson (GBR)	Peugeot–BP–Englebert	+ 0"
3	Michel Van Aerde (BEL)	Solo–Terrot	+ 0"
4	Martin Van Geneugden (BEL)	G.B.C.–Libertas	+ 0"
5	André Noyelle (BEL)	Dr. Mann–Labo	+ 0"
6	René Van Meenen (BEL)	Wiel's–Groene Leeuw	+ 0"
7	Willy Vannitsen (BEL)	Peugeot–BP–Englebert	+ 0"
8	Rik Van Looy (BEL)	G.B.C.–Libertas	+ 0"
9	Joseph Wouters (BEL)	Solo–Terrot	+ 15"
10	Jaak De Boever (BEL)	Solo–Terrot	+ 25"
