= 1964 Paris–Tours =

Race details
- Dates: 11 October 1964
- Stages: 1
- Distance: 248 km (154.1 mi)
- Winning time: 6h 48' 03"

Results
	Winner	Guido Reybrouck (BEL)
	Second	Rik Van Looy (BEL)
	Third	Gustaaf De Smet (BEL)

The 1964 Paris–Tours was the 58th edition of the Paris–Tours cycle race and was held on 11 October 1964. The race started in Paris and finished in Tours. The race was won by Guido Reybrouck.

== General classification ==
Final general classification

Rank	Rider	Time
1	Guido Reybrouck (BEL)	6h 48' 03"
2	Rik Van Looy (BEL)	+ 0"
3	Gustaaf De Smet (BEL)	+ 0"
4	Benoni Beheyt (BEL)	+ 0"
5	Frans Melckenbeeck (BEL)	+ 0"
6	Jo de Roo (NED)	+ 0"
7	René Van Meenen (BEL)	+ 0"
8	Jan Janssen (NED)	+ 0"
9	Willy Bocklant (BEL)	+ 0"
10	Carmine Preziosi (ITA)	+ 0"
