= 1957 Omloop Het Volk =

Race details
- Dates: 24 March 1957
- Stages: 1
- Distance: 207 km (129 mi)
- Winning time: 5h 22' 46"

Results
	Winner	Norbert Kerckhove (BEL)
	Second	Pino Cerami (BEL)
	Third	Leon Vandaele (BEL)

The 1957 Omloop Het Volk was the 13th edition of the Omloop Het Volk cycle race and was held on 24 March 1957. The race started and finished in Ghent. The race was won by Norbert Kerckhove.

== General classification ==
Final general classification
Rank	Rider	Time
1	Norbert Kerckhove (BEL)	5h 22' 46"
2	Pino Cerami (BEL)	+ 0"
3	Leon Vandaele (BEL)	+ 14"
4	Julien Schepens (BEL)	+ 14"
5	Rik Van Looy (BEL)	+ 14"
6	Maurice Mollin (BEL)	+ 14"
7	Seamus Elliott (IRL)	+ 14"
8	Jozef Schils (BEL)	+ 14"
9	Marcel Janssens (BEL)	+ 14"
10	Josef Verhelst (BEL)	+ 14"
