= 1966 Paris–Tours =

Race details
- Dates: 9 October 1966
- Stages: 1
- Distance: 249 km (154.7 mi)
- Winning time: 5h 44' 38"

Results
	Winner	Guido Reybrouck (BEL)
	Second	Rik Van Looy (BEL)
	Third	Paul Lemeteyer (FRA)

The 1966 Paris–Tours was the 60th edition of the Paris–Tours cycle race and was held on 9 October 1966. The race started in Paris and finished in Tours. The race was won by Guido Reybrouck.

== General classification ==
Final general classification

Rank	Rider	Time
1	Guido Reybrouck (BEL)	5h 44' 38"
2	Rik Van Looy (BEL)	+ 0"
3	Paul Lemeteyer (FRA)	+ 0"
4	Jan Janssen (NED)	+ 0"
5	Gustaaf De Smet (BEL)	+ 0"
6	Noël Foré (BEL)	+ 0"
7	Noël De Pauw (BEL)	+ 0"
8	Jos Huysmans (BEL)	+ 0"
9	Raymond Poulidor (FRA)	+ 0"
10	Gianni Marcarini (ITA)	+ 0"
