= 1962 Paris–Roubaix =

Race details
- Dates: 9 April 1962
- Stages: 1
- Distance: 258 km (160.3 mi)
- Winning time: 6h 43' 57"

Results
	Winner	Rik Van Looy (BEL)	(Flandria–Faema–Clément)
	Second	Emile Daems (BEL)	(Philco)
	Third	Frans Schoubben (BEL)	(Peugeot–BP–Dunlop)

The 1962 Paris–Roubaix was the 60th edition of the Paris–Roubaix cycle race and was held on 9 April 1962. The race started in Compiègne and finished in Roubaix. The race was won by Rik Van Looy of the Flandria team.

== General classification ==
Final general classification

Rank	Rider	Team	Time
1	Rik Van Looy (BEL)	Flandria–Faema–Clément	6h 43' 57"
2	Emile Daems (BEL)	Philco	+ 25"
3	Frans Schoubben (BEL)	Peugeot–BP–Dunlop	+ 25"
4	Jef Planckaert (BEL)	Flandria–Faema–Clément	+ 25"
5	Raymond Poulidor (FRA)	Mercier–BP–Hutchinson	+ 25"
6	Jos Wouters (BEL)	Solo–Van Steenbergen	+ 2' 40"
7	Frans Aerenhouts (BEL)	Mercier–BP–Hutchinson	+ 2' 40"
8	Jean Forestier (FRA)	Gitane–Leroux–Dunlop–R. Geminiani	+ 2' 40"
9	Raymond Impanis (BEL)	Flandria–Faema–Clément	+ 2' 40"
10	Guido Carlesi (ITA)	Philco	+ 2' 57"
