= 1960 UCI Road World Championships – Men's road race =

Men's Individual Road Race
1960 UCI Road World Championships
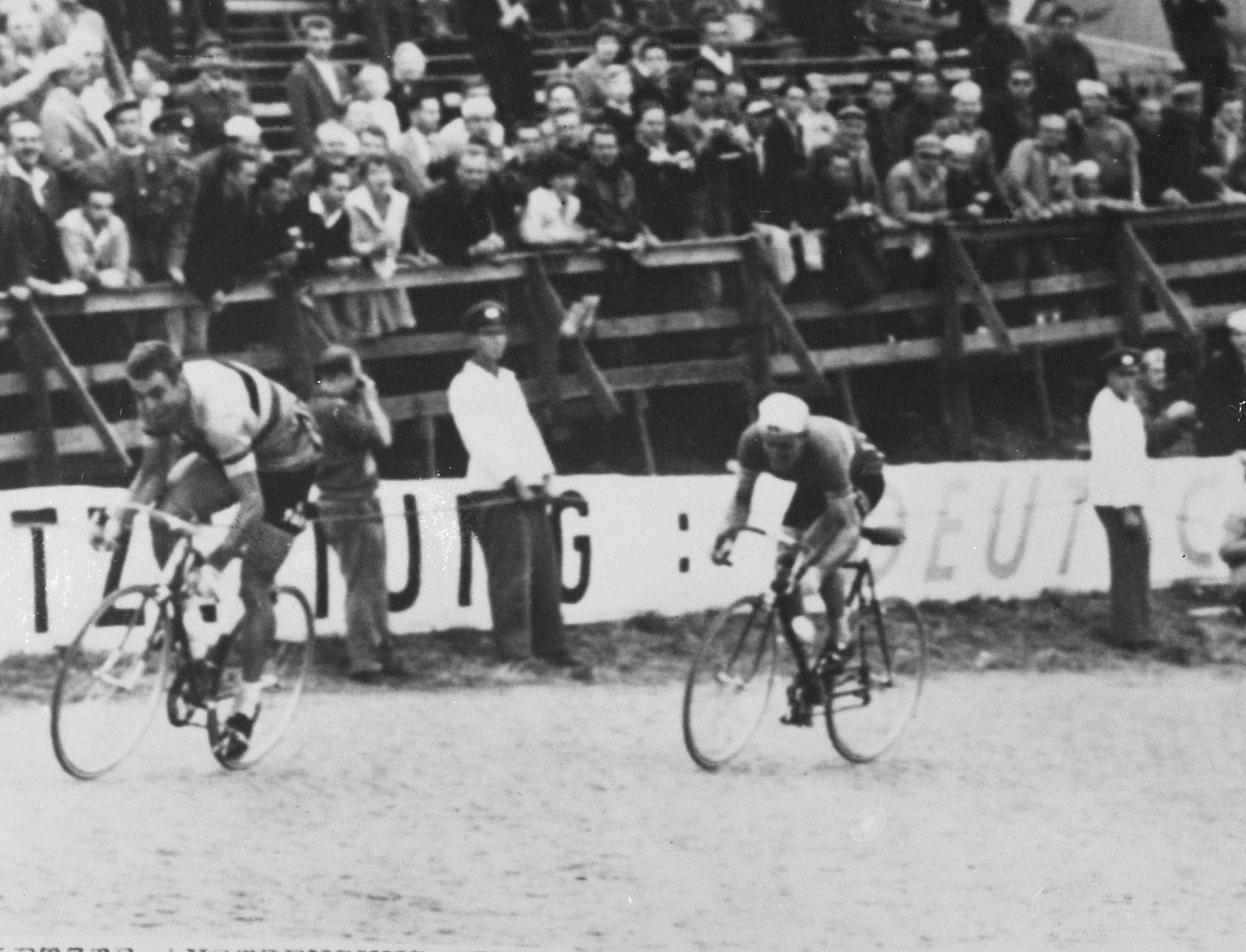
- Rik Van Looy finishes before André Darrigade

Race details
- Dates: 14 August 1960
- Stages: 1
- Distance: 279.3 km (173.5 mi)
- Winning time: 7h 47' 27"

Results
	Winner	Rik Van Looy (BEL)	(Belgium)
	Second	André Darrigade (FRA)	(France)
	Third	Pino Cerami (BEL)	(Belgium)

The men's road race at the 1960 UCI Road World Championships was the 27th edition of the event. The race took place on Sunday 14 August 1960 in Hohenstein, East Germany. The race was won by Rik Van Looy of Belgium.

== Final classification ==
General classification (1–10)

Rank	Rider	Time
1st place, gold medalist(s)	Rik Van Looy (BEL)	7h 47' 27"
2nd place, silver medalist(s)	André Darrigade (FRA)	+ 0"
3rd place, bronze medalist(s)	Pino Cerami (BEL)	+ 0"
4	Imerio Massignan (ITA)	+ 0"
5	Raymond Poulidor (FRA)	+ 0"
6	Hans Junkermann (FRG)	+ 0"
7	Charly Gaul (LUX)	+ 0"
8	Piet Damen (NED)	+ 0"
9	Jacques Anquetil (FRA)	+ 0"
10	Brian Robinson (GBR)	+ 0"
