= 1961 Liège–Bastogne–Liège =

Race details
- Dates: 15 May 1961
- Stages: 1
- Distance: 251 km (156 mi)
- Winning time: 6h 44' 34"

Results
	Winner	Rik Van Looy (BEL)	(Faema)
	Second	Marcel Rohrbach (FRA)	(Peugeot–BP–Dunlop)
	Third	Armand Desmet (BEL)	(Faema)

The 1961 Liège–Bastogne–Liège was the 47th edition of the Liège–Bastogne–Liège cycle race and was held on 15 May 1961. The race started and finished in Liège. The race was won by Rik Van Looy of the Faema team.

== General classification ==
Final general classification

Rank	Rider	Team	Time
1	Rik Van Looy (BEL)	Faema	6h 44' 34"
2	Marcel Rohrbach (FRA)	Peugeot–BP–Dunlop	+ 0"
3	Armand Desmet (BEL)	Faema	+ 0"
4	Piet van Est (NED)	Faema	+ 42"
5	Guillaume Van Tongerloo (BEL)	Faema	+ 42"
6	Emile Daems (BEL)	Philco	+ 42"
7	Pierre Ruby (FRA)	Peugeot–BP–Dunlop	+ 42"
8	Luis Otaño (ESP)	Licor 43	+ 42"
9	Alfons Hermans (BEL)	Dr. Mann	+ 42"
10	Jef Planckaert (BEL)	Wiel's–Flandria	+ 42"
