= 1959 Paris–Tours =

Race details
- Dates: 11 October 1959
- Stages: 1
- Distance: 267 km (165.9 mi)
- Winning time: 7h 04' 42"

Results
	Winner	Rik Van Looy (BEL)
	Second	Coen Niesten (NED)
	Third	André Noyelle (BEL)

The 1959 Paris–Tours was the 53rd edition of the Paris–Tours cycle race and was held on 11 October 1959. The race started in Paris and finished in Tours. The race was won by Rik Van Looy.

== General classification ==
Final general classification

Rank	Rider	Time
1	Rik Van Looy (BEL)	7h 04' 42"
2	Coen Niesten (NED)	+ 0"
3	André Noyelle (BEL)	+ 4"
4	Miguel Poblet (ESP)	+ 4"
5	Tino Sabbadini (FRA)	+ 4"
6	Marcel Ryckaert (BEL)	+ 4"
7	André Vlayen (BEL)	+ 4"
8	Frans Aerenhouts (BEL)	+ 4"
9	Michel Dejouhannet (FRA)	+ 4"
10	Jean Gainche (FRA)	+ 4"
