= 1960 Tour of Flanders =

44th Tour of Flanders
Race details
- Dates: 3 April 1960
- Stages: 1
- Distance: 227 km (141 mi)
- Winning time: 5h 52' 03"

Results
	Winner	Arthur De Cabooter (BEL)	(Groene Leeuw–Sas-Sinalco)
	Second	Jean Graczyk (FRA)	(Helyett-Leroux–Hutchinson)
	Third	Rik Van Looy (BEL)	(Faema)

The 44th running of the Tour of Flanders cycling classic was held on Sunday, 3 April 1960. Arthur De Cabooter won the race in the sprint of a group of 16 ahead of Jean Graczyk and Rik Van Looy. 72 of 164 riders finished.

== Route ==
The race started in Ghent and finished in Wetteren – totaling 227 km. The course featured five categorized climbs:

- Kwaremont
- Kruisberg
- Varent
- Valkenberg
- Kloosterstraat

== Results ==
Result
Rank	Rider	Team	Time
1	Arthur De Cabooter (BEL)	Groene Leeuw–Sas-Sinalco	5h 52' 00"
2	Jean Graczyk (FRA)	Helyett-Leroux–Hutchinson	s.t.
3	Rik Van Looy (BEL)	Faema	s.t.
4	Gilbert Desmet (BEL)	Carpano	s.t.
5	Henri De Wolf (BEL)	Helyett-Leroux–Hutchinson	s.t.
6	Frans De Mulder (BEL)	Groene Leeuw–Sas-Sinalco	s.t.
7	Pierre Ruby (FRA)	Peugeot–BP–Dunlop	s.t.
8	Raymond Impanis (BEL)	Faema	s.t.
9	Frans Schoubben (BEL)	Peugeot–BP–Dunlop	s.t.
10	Alfons Hermans (BEL)	Dr. Mann–Dossche	s.t.
