= 1963 UCI Road World Championships – Men's road race =

Men's Individual Road Race
1963 UCI Road World Championships
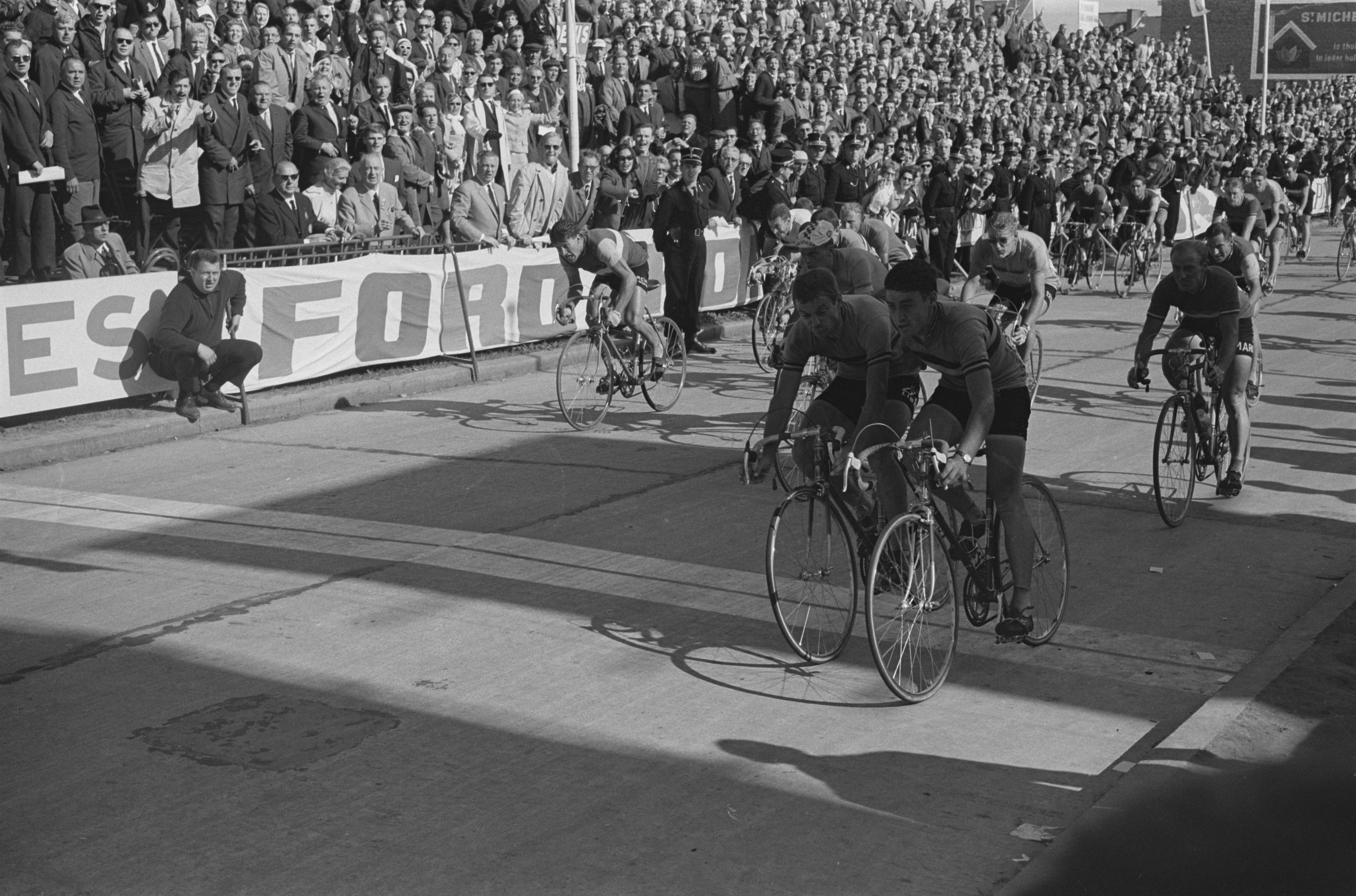
- Beheyt beating Van Looy on the finish line

Race details
- Dates: 11 August 1963
- Stages: 1
- Distance: 278.8 km (173.2 mi)
- Winning time: 7h 25' 26"

Results
	Winner	Benoni Beheyt (BEL)	(Belgium)
	Second	Rik Van Looy (BEL)	(Belgium)
	Third	Jo de Haan (NED)	(Netherlands)

The men's road race at the 1963 UCI Road World Championships was the 30th edition of the event. The race took place on Sunday 11 August 1963 in Ronse, Belgium. The race was won by Benoni Beheyt of Belgium.

== Final classification ==
General classification (1–10)

Rank	Rider	Time
1st place, gold medalist(s)	Benoni Beheyt (BEL)	7h 25' 26"
2nd place, silver medalist(s)	Rik Van Looy (BEL)	+ 0"
3rd place, bronze medalist(s)	Jo de Haan (NED)	+ 0"
4	André Darrigade (FRA)	+ 0"
5	Raymond Poulidor (FRA)	+ 0"
6	Gilbert Desmet (BEL)	+ 0"
7	Jan Janssen (NED)	+ 0"
8	Franco Cribiori (ITA)	+ 0"
9	Jean Stablinski (FRA)	+ 0"
10	Sigi Renz (FRG)	+ 0"
