= 1961 UCI Road World Championships – Men's road race =

Men's Individual Road Race
1961 UCI Road World Championships
- Rainbow jersey

Race details
- Dates: 3 September 1961
- Stages: 1
- Distance: 285.2 km (177.2 mi)
- Winning time: 7h 46' 35"

Results
	Winner	Rik Van Looy (BEL)	(Belgium)
	Second	Nino Defilippis (ITA)	(Italy)
	Third	Raymond Poulidor (FRA)	(France)

The men's road race at the 1961 UCI Road World Championships was the 28th edition of the event. The race took place on Sunday 3 September 1961 in Bern, Switzerland. The race was won by Rik Van Looy of Belgium.

== Final classification ==
General classification (1–10)

Rank	Rider	Time
1st place, gold medalist(s)	Rik Van Looy (BEL)	7h 46' 35"
2nd place, silver medalist(s)	Nino Defilippis (ITA)	+ 0"
3rd place, bronze medalist(s)	Raymond Poulidor (FRA)	+ 0"
4	José Bernárdez (ESP)	+ 0"
5	Jo de Roo (NED)	+ 0"
6	Jean Stablinski (FRA)	+ 0"
7	Jef Planckaert (BEL)	+ 0"
8	Gastone Nencini (ITA)	+ 0"
9	Tom Simpson (GBR)	+ 0"
10	Hans Junkermann (FRG)	+ 0"
