= 1968 La Flèche Wallonne =

Race details
- Dates: 21 April 1968
- Stages: 1
- Distance: 222 km (137.9 mi)
- Winning time: 6h 05' 00"

Results
	Winner	Rik Van Looy (BEL)	(Willem II–Gazelle)
	Second	José Samyn (FRA)	(Pelforth–Sauvage–Lejeune)
	Third	Jan Janssen (NED)	(Pelforth–Sauvage–Lejeune)

The 1968 La Flèche Wallonne was the 32nd edition of La Flèche Wallonne cycle race and was held on 21 April 1968. The race started in Liège and finished in Marcinelle. The race was won by Rik Van Looy of the Willem II–Gazelle team.

== General classification ==
Final general classification

Rank	Rider	Team	Time
1	Rik Van Looy (BEL)	Willem II–Gazelle	6h 05' 00"
2	José Samyn (FRA)	Pelforth–Sauvage–Lejeune	+ 3"
3	Jan Janssen (NED)	Pelforth–Sauvage–Lejeune	+ 1' 10"
4	Felice Gimondi (ITA)	Salvarani	+ 1' 10"
5	Jos Huysmans (BEL)	Dr. Mann–Grundig	+ 1' 10"
6	Victor Van Schil (BEL)	Faema	+ 1' 10"
7	Remi Van Vreckom (NED)		+ 1' 10"
8	Herman Van Springel (BEL)	Dr. Mann–Grundig	+ 1' 10"
9	Walter Godefroot (BEL)	Flandria–De Clerck	+ 1' 10"
10	Willy Van Neste (BEL)	Bic	+ 1' 10"
