= 1956 Gent–Wevelgem =

Race details
- Dates: 25 March 1956
- Stages: 1
- Distance: 228 km (142 mi)
- Winning time: 6h 21' 00"

Results
	Winner	Rik Van Looy (BEL)
	Second	Richard Van Genechten (BEL)
	Third	Désiré Keteleer (BEL)

The 1956 Gent–Wevelgem was the 18th edition of the Belgian Gent–Wevelgem cycle race and was held on 25 March 1956. The race started in Ghent and finished in Wevelgem. The race was won by Rik Van Looy.

== General classification ==
Final general classification

Rank	Rider	Time
1	Rik Van Looy (BEL)	6h 21' 00"
2	Richard Van Genechten (BEL)	+ 7"
3	Désiré Keteleer (BEL)	+ 30"
4	Marcel Janssens (BEL)	+ 30"
5	Karel De Baere (BEL)	+ 1' 10"
6	Stan Ockers (BEL)	+ 1' 10"
7	Rik Van Steenbergen (BEL)	+ 1' 10"
8	Raymond Impanis (BEL)	+ 1' 10"
9	Ernest Sterckx (BEL)	+ 1' 10"
10	Alfons Van den Brande (BEL)	+ 1' 10"
