= Flèche Enghiennoise =

Recurring sporting event

Race details
- Date: April
- Region: Wallonia (Belgium)
- English name: Enghien Arrow
- Local name: Flèche Enghiennoise (French)
- Discipline: Road
- Competition: Cat. 1.2
- Type: One-day

History
- First edition: 1965
- Editions: 5
- Final edition: 1969
- First winner: Rik Van Looy (BEL)
- Final winner: Roger Pingeon (FRA)

The Flèche Enghiennoise was a short-lived men's cycling race organized for the last time in 1969. The course, around 200 km, was situated in Enghien, on the border of the Belgian provinces Brabant and Hainaut.

The race always took place in the second half of April.

The competition's roll of honor includes the successes of Rik Van Looy, Roger Pingeon and Felice Gimondi.

== Winners ==
Year	Winner	Second	Third
1965	(Belgium) Rik Van Looy	(Belgium) Gustaaf Van Vaerenbergh	(Belgium) Urbain De Brauwer
1966	(Netherlands) Piet Rentmeester	(Netherlands) Jo de Roo	(Belgium) Julien Stevens
1967	(Belgium) Georges Vandenberghe	(Belgium) Rik Van Looy	(Belgium) Frans Aerenhouts
1968	(Italy) Felice Gimondi	(Belgium) Rik Van Looy	(Belgium) Willy Planckaert
1969	(France) Roger Pingeon	(Belgium) Herman Vrijders	(Belgium) André Hendricks
