= 1959 Tour of Flanders =

43rd Tour of Flanders
Race details
- Dates: 30 March 1959
- Stages: 1
- Distance: 242 km (150.4 mi)
- Winning time: 6h 14'

Results
	Winner	Rik Van Looy (BEL)	(Faema–Guerra)
	Second	Frans Schoubben (BEL)	(Peugeot–BP–Dunlop)
	Third	Gilbert Desmet (BEL)	(Faema–Guerra)

The 43rd running of the Tour of Flanders cycling classic was held on Sunday, 30 March 1959. Belgian Rik Van Looy won the race in a three-man sprint with Frans Schoubben and Gilbert Desmet. 58 of 143 riders finished.

== Route ==
The race started in Ghent and finished in Wetteren – covering 242 km. The course featured five categorized climbs:

- Kwaremont
- Kruisberg
- Statieberg
- Valkenberg
- Kloosterstraat (Geraardsbergen)

== Results ==
Result
Rank	Rider	Team	Time
1	Rik Van Looy (BEL)	Faema–Guerra	6h 14' 00"
2	Frans Schoubben (BEL)	Peugeot–BP–Dunlop	s.t.
3	Gilbert Desmet (BEL)	Faema–Guerra	+ 3"
4	Arthur Decabooter (BEL)	Groene Leeuw–Sas-Sinalco	+ 10"
5	Jaap Kersten (NED)	Magneet–Vredestein	s.t.
6	Edgard Sorgeloos (BEL)	Faema–Guerra	s.t.
7	Jean-Claude Annaert (FRA)	Rapha–Gem–Dunlop	s.t.
8	Norbert Vantieghem (BEL)	Flandria–Dr.Mann	s.t.
9	Seamus Elliot (IRL)	Helyett–Leroux–Fynsec–Hutchinson	s.t.
10	Henri Denijs (BEL)	Groene Leeuw–Sas-Sinalco	s.t.
