= 1965 Tour of Flanders =

49th Tour of Flanders
Race details
- Dates: 17 April 1965
- Stages: 1
- Distance: 272 km (169.0 mi)
- Winning time: 5h 47' 29"

Results
	Winner	Jo de Roo (NED)	(Televizier)
	Second	Edward Sels (BEL)	(Solo–Superia)
	Third	Georges Van Coningsloo (BEL)	(Peugeot-BP–Michelin)

The 49th Tour of Flanders cycling classic was held on Saturday, 17 April 1965. The race was won by Dutch rider Jo de Roo in a two-man sprint with Edward Sels. 51 of 119 riders finished.

== Route ==
The race started in Ghent and finished in Gentbrugge – covering 240 km. There were six categorized climbs:

- Kwaremont
- Kruisberg
- Edelareberg
- Valkenberg
- Kasteelstraat
- Semmerzake

== Results ==
Result
Rank	Rider	Team	Time
1	Jo de Roo (NED)	Televizier	5h 47' 29"
2	Edward Sels (BEL)	Solo–Superia	s.t.
3	Georges Van Coningsloo (BEL)	Peugeot-BP–Michelin	+ 33"
4	Willy Vannitsen (BEL)	Ford France–Gitane	s.t.
5	Jean Stablinski (FRA)	Ford France–Gitane	s.t.
6	Rik Van Looy (BEL)	Solo–Superia	s.t.
7	Carmine Preziosi (ITA)	Pelforth–Sauvage–Lejeune	+ 58"
8	Gustaaf De Smet (BEL)	Wiels–Groene Leeuw	s.t.
9	Arthur Decabooter (BEL)	Wiels–Groene Leeuw	s.t.
10	Vic Van Schil (BEL)	Mercier–BP–Hutchinson	s.t.
