= GP Briek Schotte =

Belgian one-day cycling race, one of the five monuments

- Poster to the 2014 edition

Race details
- Date: September
- Region: West Flanders, Belgium
- Local name(s): Grote Prijs Briek Schotte, Desselgem Koerse
- Discipline: Road
- Type: Criterium
- Organiser: Véloclub De Leiezonen

History
- First edition: 1941
- Editions: 79 (as of 2023)
- First winner: Briek Schotte (BEL)
- Most wins: Gilbert Desmet (BEL) (4 wins)
- Most recent: Kobe Vanoverschelde (BEL)

The GP Briek Schotte is a criterium road cycling race held annually around the village of Desselgem in West Flanders, Belgium. The race was first organized in 1941. In 1942 and 1947, two editions were organized, one in July and the other in September. The race was named in honor of Belgian cyclist Briek Schotte, the winner of the first three editions of the race.

== Winners ==
Year	Winner	Second	Third
1941	(Belgium) Briek Schotte		
1942 (July)	(Belgium) Briek Schotte		
1942 (Sept.)	(Belgium) Briek Schotte		
1943	(Belgium) André Defoort		
1944	Cancelled		
1945	(Belgium) Roger Desmet		
1946	Cancelled		
1947 (July)	(Belgium) Maurice Meersman		
1947 (Sept.)	(Belgium) Norbert Callens		
1948	(Belgium) André Maelbrancke		
1949	(Belgium) Henri Denijs		
1950	(Belgium) Georges De Craeye		
1951–1952	Cancelled		
1953	(Belgium) Emile Severeyns		
1954	(Belgium) Paul Borremans		
1955	(Belgium) Gilbert Desmet		
1956	(Belgium) Germain Derycke		
1957	(Belgium) Emile Severeyns		
1958	(Belgium) Paul Borremans		
1959	(Belgium) Gilbert Desmet		
1960	(Belgium) Gilbert Desmet		
1961	(Belgium) Arthur Decabooter		
1962	(Belgium) Norbert Kerckhove		
1963	(Belgium) Gilbert Desmet		
1964	(Belgium) Julien Gekiere		
1965	(Belgium) Willy Planckaert		
1966	(Belgium) Daniel Van Ryckeghem		
1967	(Belgium) Rik Van Looy		
1968	(Belgium) Jos Huysmans		
1969	(Belgium) Rik Van Looy		
1970	(Belgium) Eric Leman		
1971	(Belgium) Edward Janssens		
1972	(Belgium) Christian Callens		
1973	(Belgium) Walter Godefroot		
1974	(Belgium) Willy Van Malderghem		
1975	(Belgium) Herman Van Springel		
1976	(Belgium) Willem Peeters		
1977	(Belgium) Jos Schipper		
1978	(Belgium) Willem Peeters		
1979	(Belgium) Johnny De Nul		
1980	(Belgium) Frans Van Looy		
1981	(Belgium) André Dierickx		
1982	(Belgium) Eddy Planckaert		
1983	(Belgium) Ivan Lamote		
1984	(Belgium) Patrick Versluys		
1985	(Belgium) Dirk Heirweg		
1986	(Belgium) Johan Capiot		
1987	(Belgium) Dirk Demol		
1988	(Belgium) Johan Museeuw		
1989	(Belgium) Jean-Marie Vernie		
1990	(Belgium) Gino De Backer		
1991	(Netherlands) Patrick Eyk		
1992	(Belgium) Johan Verstrepen		
1993	(Belgium) Bart Leysen		
1994	(Belgium) Hendrik Redant		
1995	(Netherlands) Jans Koerts		
1996	(Belgium) Wim Omloop		
1997	(Belgium) Wim Feys		
1998	(Belgium) Jo Planckaert		
1999	(Belgium) Johan Museeuw		
2000	(Netherlands) Max van Heeswijk		
2001	(Belgium) Wilfried Peeters		
2002	(Belgium) Sven Vanthourenhout		
2003	(Belgium) Wilfried Cretskens		
2004	(Belgium) Wilfried Cretskens		
2005	(Belgium) Wouter Weylandt		
2006	(Netherlands) Johnny Hoogerland		
2007	(Netherlands) Steven de Jongh		
2008	(Italy) Mauro Facci		
2009	(Belgium) Niko Eeckhout		
2010	(Belgium) Kevin Van Impe		
2011	(Belgium) Guillaume Van Keirsbulck		
2012	(Belgium) Guillaume Van Keirsbulck		
2013	(Belgium) Julien Vermote		
2014	(United Kingdom) Andrew Fenn	(Belgium) Iljo Keisse	(Italy) Gianluca Brambilla
2015	(Netherlands) Brian van Goethem	(Poland) Łukasz Wiśniowski	(Belgium) Boris Vallée
2016	(Netherlands) Brian van Goethem	(Belgium) Jasper de Buyst	(Belgium) Sep Vanmarcke
2017	(Belgium) Timothy Dupont	(Netherlands) Piotr Havik	(Norway) Carl Fredrik Hagen
2018	(Belgium) Milan Menten	(Belgium) Enzo Wouters	(Belgium) Kenny Dehaes
2019	(Belgium) Arjen Livyns	(Albania) Ylber Sefa	(Australia) Michael Freiberg
2020–2021	Cancelled		
2022	(Belgium) Kobe Vanoverschelde	(Netherlands) Jente Klaver	(Netherlands) Meindert Weulink
2023	(Belgium) Jonas Rickaert	(Belgium) Jordi Warlop	(Belgium) Maarten Verheyen
