= 1964 Omloop Het Volk =

Race details
- Dates: 29 February 1964
- Stages: 1
- Distance: 194 km (121 mi)
- Winning time: 4h 34' 00"

Results
	Winner	Frans Melckenbeeck (BEL)
	Second	Arthur Decabooter (BEL)
	Third	Yvo Molenaers (BEL)

The 1964 Omloop Het Volk was the 19th edition of the Omloop Het Volk cycle race and was held on 29 February 1964. The race started and finished in Ghent. The race was won by Frans Melckenbeeck.

== General classification ==
Final general classification
Rank	Rider	Time
1	Frans Melckenbeeck (BEL)	4h 34' 00"
2	Arthur Decabooter (BEL)	+ 0"
3	Yvo Molenaers (BEL)	+ 0"
4	Frans Aerenhouts (BEL)	+ 0"
5	Gilbert Maes (BEL)	+ 0"
6	Lode Troonbeeckx (BEL)	+ 0"
7	Joseph Bosmans (BEL)	+ 0"
8	Edward Sels (BEL)	+ 0"
9	Guillaume Demaer (BEL)	+ 0"
10	Willy Van Driessche (BEL)	+ 0"
