= 1967 Paris–Roubaix =

Race details
- Dates: 9 April 1967
- Stages: 1
- Distance: 263 km (163.4 mi)
- Winning time: 7h 08' 31"

Results
	Winner	Jan Janssen (NED)	(Pelforth–Sauvage–Lejeune)
	Second	Rik Van Looy (BEL)	(Willem II–Gazelle)
	Third	Rudi Altig (FRG)	(Molteni)

The 1967 Paris–Roubaix was the 65th edition of the Paris–Roubaix cycle race and was held on 9 April 1967. The race started in Compiègne and finished in Roubaix. The race was won by Jan Janssen of the Pelforth team.

== General classification ==
Final general classification

Rank	Rider	Team	Time
1	Jan Janssen (NED)	Pelforth–Sauvage–Lejeune	7h 08' 31"
2	Rik Van Looy (BEL)	Willem II–Gazelle	+ 0"
3	Rudi Altig (FRG)	Molteni	+ 0"
4	Georges Vandenberghe (BEL)	Roméo–Smith's	+ 0"
5	Edward Sels (BEL)	Flandria–De Clerck	+ 0"
6	Willy Planckaert (BEL)	Roméo–Smith's	+ 0"
7	Raymond Poulidor (FRA)	Mercier–BP–Hutchinson	+ 0"
8	Eddy Merckx (BEL)	Peugeot–BP–Michelin	+ 0"
9	Arthur Decabooter (BEL)	Groene Leeuw–Tibetan–Pull Over Centrale	+ 0"
10	Gianni Motta (ITA)	Molteni	+ 0"
