= 1961 Omloop Het Volk =

Race details
- Dates: 4 March 1961
- Stages: 1
- Distance: 177 km (110 mi)
- Winning time: 4h 07' 00"

Results
	Winner	Arthur Decabooter (BEL)
	Second	Frans Schoubben (BEL)
	Third	Georges Decraeye (BEL)

The 1961 Omloop Het Volk was the 16th edition of the Omloop Het Volk cycle race and was held on 4 March 1961. The race started and finished in Ghent. The race was won by Arthur Decabooter.

== General classification ==
Final general classification
Rank	Rider	Time
1	Arthur Decabooter (BEL)	4h 07' 00"
2	Frans Schoubben (BEL)	+ 0"
3	Georges Decraeye (BEL)	+ 0"
4	Henri De Wolf (BEL)	+ 0"
5	Jaak Van de Klundert (NED)	+ 0"
6	Marcel Ongenae (BEL)	+ 0"
7	Hubert Ferrer (FRA)	+ 18"
8	Michel Van Aerde (BEL)	+ 25"
9	Bas Maliepaard (NED)	+ 25"
10	Coen Niesten (NED)	+ 25"
