= 1958 Milan–San Remo =

Race details
- Dates: 19 March 1958
- Stages: 1
- Distance: 282 km (175 mi)
- Winning time: 6h 41' 09"

Results
	Winner	Rik Van Looy (BEL)
	Second	Miguel Poblet (ESP)
	Third	André Darrigade (FRA)

The 1958 Milan–San Remo was the 49th edition of the Milan–San Remo cycle race and was held on 19 March 1958. The race started in Milan and finished in San Remo. The race was won by Rik Van Looy.

== General classification ==
Final general classification

Rank	Rider	Time
1	Rik Van Looy (BEL)	6h 41' 09"
2	Miguel Poblet (ESP)	+ 0"
3	André Darrigade (FRA)	+ 0"
4	Angelo Conterno (ITA)	+ 0"
5	Giorgio Albani (ITA)	+ 0"
6	Fred De Bruyne (BEL)	+ 0"
7	Alfons Van den Brande (BEL)	+ 0"
8	Pierino Baffi (ITA)	+ 0"
9	Guido Messina (ITA)	+ 0"
10	Renzo Accordi (ITA)	+ 0"
