= 1955 Gent–Wevelgem =

Race details
- Dates: 3 April 1955
- Stages: 1
- Distance: 228 km (142 mi)
- Winning time: 6h 15' 00"

Results
	Winner	Briek Schotte (BEL)
	Second	Désiré Keteleer (BEL)
	Third	Raymond Impanis (BEL)

The 1955 Gent–Wevelgem was the 17th edition of the Belgian Gent–Wevelgem cycle race and was held on 3 April 1955. The race started in Ghent and finished in Wevelgem. The race was won by Briek Schotte.

== General classification ==
Final general classification

Rank	Rider	Time
1	Briek Schotte (BEL)	6h 15' 00"
2	Désiré Keteleer (BEL)	+ 2' 36"
3	Raymond Impanis (BEL)	+ 2' 36"
4	André Noyelle (BEL)	+ 2' 36"
5	Ferdinand Kübler (SUI)	+ 2' 36"
6	René Mertens (BEL)	+ 3' 00"
7	Lode Anthonis (BEL)	+ 3' 00"
8	Marcel Ryckaert (BEL)	+ 3' 00"
9	Ernest Sterckx (BEL)	+ 3' 00"
10	Léopold Degraeveleyn (BEL)	+ 3' 00"
