= Benoni Beheyt =

Belgian cyclist

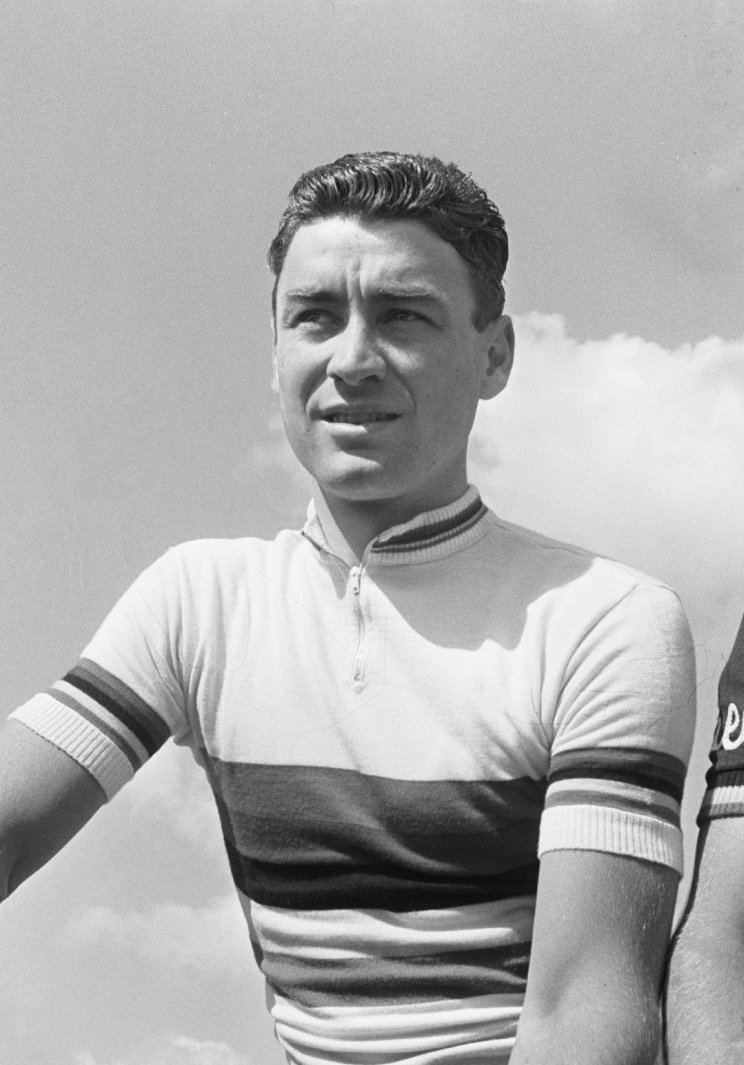
- Beheyt in 1964

Personal information
- Full name: Benoni Beheyt
- Born: 27 September 1940 (age 86) Zwijnaarde, Belgium

Cycling career
- Sport: Cycling
- Current team: Retired
- Discipline: Road
- Role: Rider

Major wins
- Grand Tours Tour de France 1 individual stage (1964) One-day races and Classics World Road Race Championships (1963)
Medal record
Men's road bicycle racing
Representing Belgium
World Championships
Gold medal – first place	1963 Ronse	Road Race

Benoni Beheyt (born 27 September 1940) is a Belgian former professional road bicycle racer who raced from 1962 to 1968. Beheyt won 22 races and is most famous for winning the 1963 World Cycling Championships Road Race and stage win of the 1964 Tour de France. He also competed in the individual road race and team time trial events at the 1960 Summer Olympics.

== Major results ==
1962 – Wiel's-Groene Leeuw
1st Brussel–Ingooigem
2nd Overall Tour du Nord

1st stage 1

1st stage 2 Tour de Picardie
1st Melle
2nd Omloop van Oost-Vlaanderen
3rd Paris–Tours
3rd Nationale Sluitingsprijs
1963 – Wiel's-Groene Leeuw
1st Road race, UCI Road World Championships
1st Gent–Wevelgem
1st Grand Prix de Fourmies
1st Overall Tour de Wallonie
1st Antwerpen - Ougrée
1st St-Andries
1st Bruxelles-Alsemberg
1st Gavere
2nd Omloop van Midden-Vlaanderen
2nd La Roue d'Or (with Noël Foré)
3rd Grand Prix de Denain
3rd Nationale Sluitingsprijs
3rd Boulogne
1964 – Wiel's-Groene Leeuw
49th Overall Tour de France

1st Stage 22a (Orléans – Versailles, 118.5 km)

1st Overall Tour of Belgium
Circuit du Provençal

1st stage 1a and 2b

1st La Ronde d'Aix-en-Provence
1st Bourcefranc
1st Callac
1st Ronde van Oost-Vlaanderen
2nd Tour of Flanders
2nd Paris–Roubaix
2nd GP du Tournaisis
2nd Nationale Sluitingsprijs
3rd Omloop der Vlaamse Gewesten
3rd Paris-Brussels
1965 – Wiel's-Groene Leeuw
1st Omloop van Midden-Vlaanderen
1st Plumeliau
1st Trelissac
2nd Brussels-Ingooigem
3rd Dwars door West-Vlaanderen
1966 – Wiel's-Groene Leeuw
1967 – Tibetan-Pullover Centrale
1968 – Pullover Centrale-Motte

== Tour de France record ==
- 1963: 49th overall
- 1964: 49th overall and 1 stage win
- 1965: 47th overall
