= Arthur Decabooter =

Belgian cyclist (1936–2012)

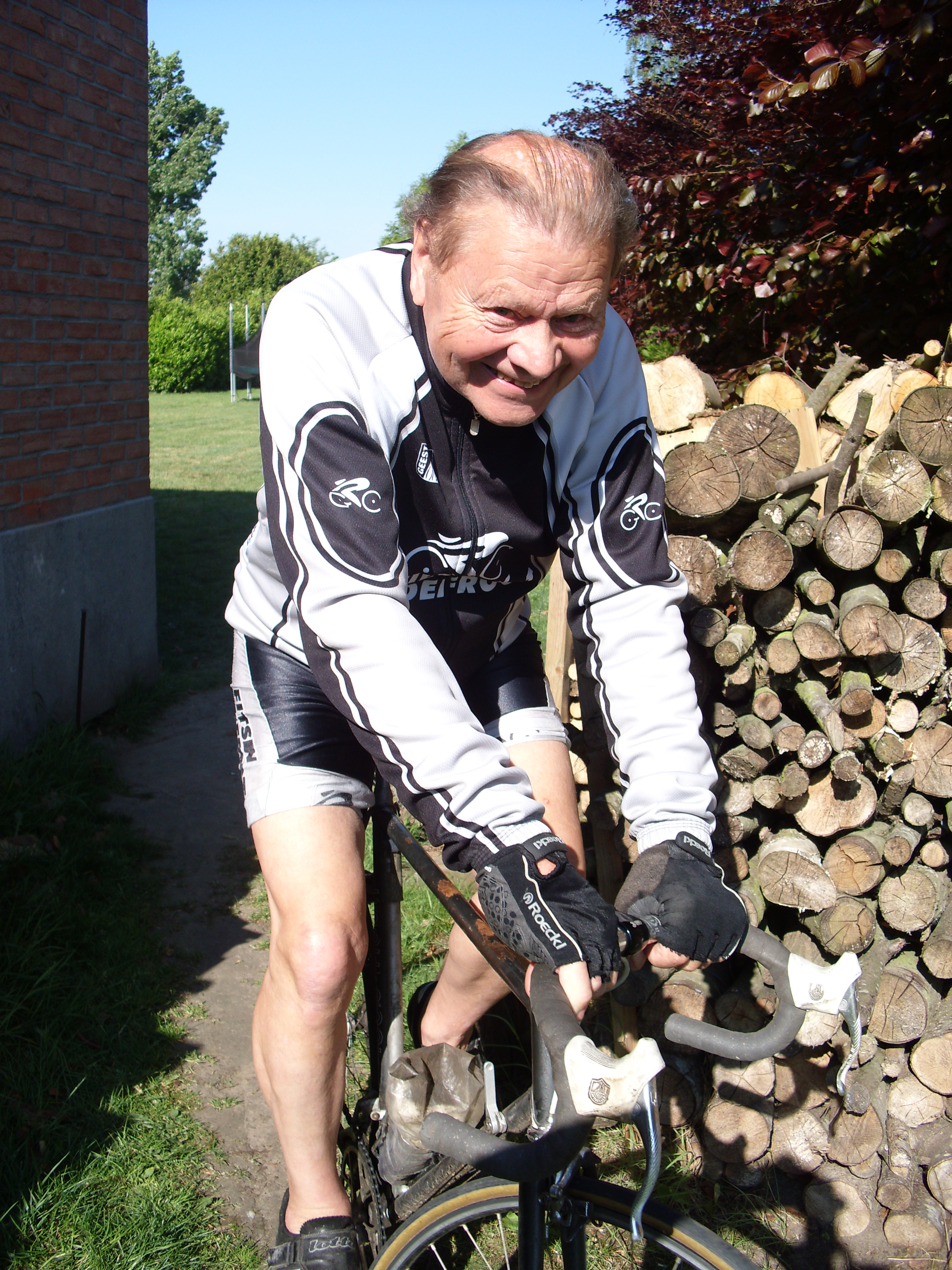
- Decabooter in 2011

Personal information
- Full name: Arthur Decabooter
- Nickname: El Toro
- Born: 3 October 1936 Welden, Belgium
- Died: 26 May 2012 (aged 75)

Cycling career
- Sport: Cycling
- Discipline: Road
- Role: Rider
- Rider type: Classics rider

Professional teams
- 1959–1961: Groene Leeuw–SAS–Sinalco
- 1962: Liberia–Grammont–Wolber
- 1963–1964: Solo–Superia
- 1965–1967: Wiel's–Groene Leeuw
- 1967: Tibetan–Pull Over Centrale

Major wins
- Grand Tours Vuelta a España Points classification (1960) 3 individual stages (1960, 1961) One-day races and Classics Ronde van Vlaanderen (1960) Omloop het Volk (1961) Kuurne–Brussels–Kuurne (1964) Omloop der Vlaamse Gewesten (1967)

Arthur Decabooter (3 October 1936 – 26 May 2012) was a Belgian professional racing cyclist, active as a professional between 1959 and 1967. Cyclist Walter Godefroot is his wife's brother-in-law.

Apart from a few years when he was signed to Libéria-Grammont (1962) and to Solo (1963–1964), he rode for the Groene Leeuw team. His major wins were the 1960 Tour of Flanders and 2 stages and the points classification in the Vuelta a España the same year. Decabooter's other wins include Dwars door België, Omloop Het Volk, Kuurne–Brussels–Kuurne, E3 Prijs Vlaanderen – Harelbeke, and a stage in the Tour of Belgium.

== Major results ==
=== Road ===
1955
1st Ronde van Vlaanderen Beloften
3rd Overall Omloop der 9 Provincies

1st Stages 3, 6 (ITT) & 7

1st Grand Prix of Essex
3rd Gent–Wevelgem amateurs
1958
1st GP Gemeente Kortemark
1st GP Erpe-Mere
1st Nokere Koerse
1st Ronde van Vlaanderen Independents
1959
1st Dr. Tistaertprijs Zottegem
1st Omloop van het Houtland
2nd Omloop der Vlaamse Ardennen
2nd Kuurne–Brussels–Kuurne
2nd Omloop Mandel-Leie-Schelde
2nd Dwars door West-Vlaanderen
4th Ronde van Vlaanderen
1960
1st Kampioenschap van Oost-Vlaanderen
1st Tour of Flanders
1st Overall Dwars door België
1st Grote Prijs Marcel Kint
Vuelta a España

1st Points classification
1st Stages 8 & 15

1st Stages 1 & 4 (TTT) of the Tour of Belgium
1st Schelde–Dender–Leie
2nd Omloop van het Houtland
3rd National Road Race Championships
4th Milan–San Remo
1961
1st Omloop Het Volk
1st E3 Prijs Vlaanderen – Harelbeke
1st Stage 11 of the Vuelta a España
1st Grand Prix de Denain
1st GP Briek Schotte
3rd Omloop der Vlaamse Gewesten
1962
1st Omloop van Midden-Vlaanderen
2nd Omloop der Vlaamse Gewesten
2nd GP Frans Melckenbeek
3rd Schaal Sels
3rd Ronde van Brabant
1963
1st Omloop der drie Provinciën
1st Omloop Leidedal
2nd Omloop van West-Brabant
3rd Grote Prijs Marcel Kint
1964
1st Kuurne–Brussels–Kuurne
1st Omloop van het Houtland
2nd Omloop Het Volk
2nd Omloop van Midden-Vlaanderen
2nd GP Roeselare
3rd Halle–Ingooigem
6th Ronde van Vlaanderen
1965
1st Nokere Koerse
1st Geraardsbergen-Viane
1st Stage 3 (TTT) Tour du Nord
2nd Circuit des Frontières
2nd Kampioenschap van Vlaanderen
3rd National Road Race Championships
3rd Omloop van Midden-Vlaanderen
5th Paris–Tours
9th Tour of Flanders
1966
1st Stages 6 & 8 of the Vuelta a Andalucía
1st Elfstedenronde
1st Stage 5a of the Four Days of Dunkirk
8th Paris–Roubaix
1967
1st Omloop der Vlaamse Gewesten
1st Roubaix-Cassel-Roubaix
2nd Elfstedenronde
9th Paris–Roubaix

=== Track ===
1961
3rd Six Days of Ghent (with Klaus Bugdahl)
1962
3rd Belgian National Championships (with Willy Vannitsen)
1963
3rd Belgian National Championships (with Willy Vannitsen)
1961
3rd Six Days of Madrid (with José Manuel López Rodríguez)
