= Norbert Kerckhove =

Belgian cyclist

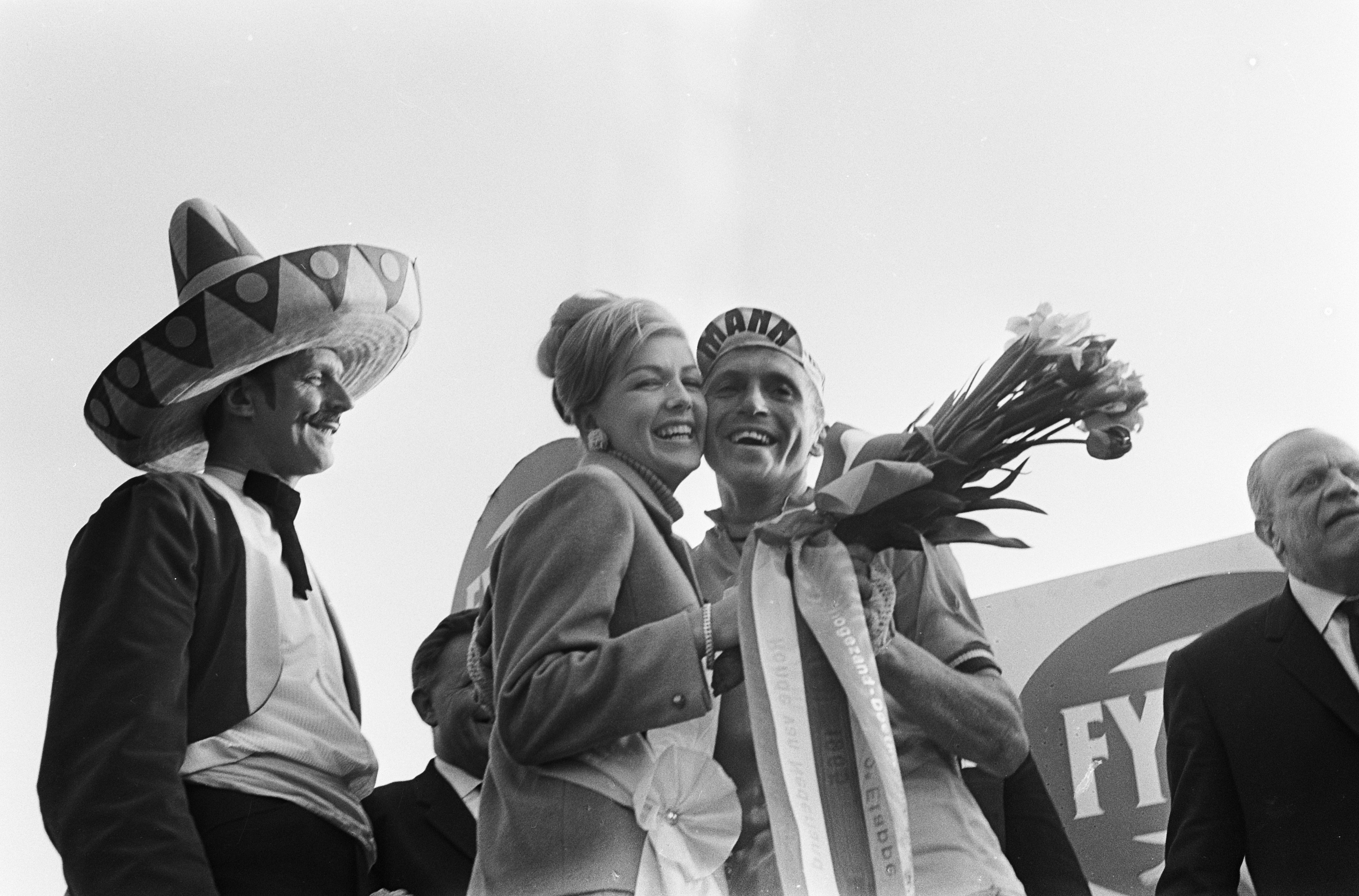

Personal information
- Born: 21 October 1932 Meulebeke, Belgium
- Died: 4 July 2006 (aged 73) Meulebeke, Belgium

Cycling career
- Sport: Cycling
- Role: Rider

Norbert Kerckhove (21 October 1932 – 4 July 2006) was a Belgian professional racing cyclist. He won the E3 Harelbeke in 1959.

1956 : 1e Grote Prijs stad Kortrijk

1957 : 1e Omloop Het Volk, 3e Ronde van Vlaanderen, 3e Kuurne – Brussel – Kuurne, 6e Gent – Wevelgem, 8e Parijs – Roubaix, 1e Ronde van Picardië (2e eindstand), 1e Omloop West-Vlaamse Bergen, 1e Zegelsem, deelnemer Ronde van Frankrijk (10 Belgen)

1958 : 6e Kuurne – Brussel – Kuurne, 7e Parijs – Brussel, 1e Maldegem, 1e Zulte, 1e Dentergem, 4e Kamp v België, 1e Meulebeke

1959 : 9e Waalse Pijl, 1e E3 Prijs Vlaanderen, 1e Deinze, 1e St Andries Brugge, 1e Moeskroen (Kamp van West-Vlaanderen), 1e Deurle, 1e Omloop Mandel-Leie-Schelde

1960 : 1e Ciney – Waregem Dwars door Vlaanderen (2e etappe), 1e Moeskroen, 1e Lendelede, 5e Parijs – Tours

1961 : 4e Parijs – Roubaix (the day after his 2-year-old son Joost died in accident), 10e Gent-Wevelgem, 1e Criterium Aalst, 1e Herve, 1e Kortemark

1962 : 6e Omloop Het Volk, 5e Kuurne – Brussel – Kuurne, 1e Diksmuide, 3e Ronde van Vlaanderen, 10e Luik-Bastenaken-Luik, 1e Brugge – Gent – Brugge, 1e Ninove, 1e Antwerpen, 1e Zonnebeke, 1e GP Briek Schotte, 1e Omloop van het Houtland

1963 : 6e Kuurne – Brussel – Kuurne, 7e Parijs – Brussel, 3e Nokere Koerse, 1e Omloop Mandel-Leie-Schelde, 1e Zwevegem, 1e Ledegem, 7e Parijs – Tours

1964 : 8e Kuurne – Brussel – Kuurne, 2e E3 Prijs Vlaanderen, 1e GP Jef Scherens, 1e St Andries Brugge, 1e Waasmunster, 1e Eke, 1e Heule

1965 : 7e Kuurne – Brussel – Kuurne, 9e Gent – Wevelgem, 1e in 2e etappe Ronde van Nederland, 1e Aartrijke, 1e Wingene

1966 : 3e Kuurne – Brussel – Kuurne, 1e Bellegem, 1e Beernem

1967 : 1e Wattrelos
