= Noël Foré =

Belgian cyclist (1932–1994)

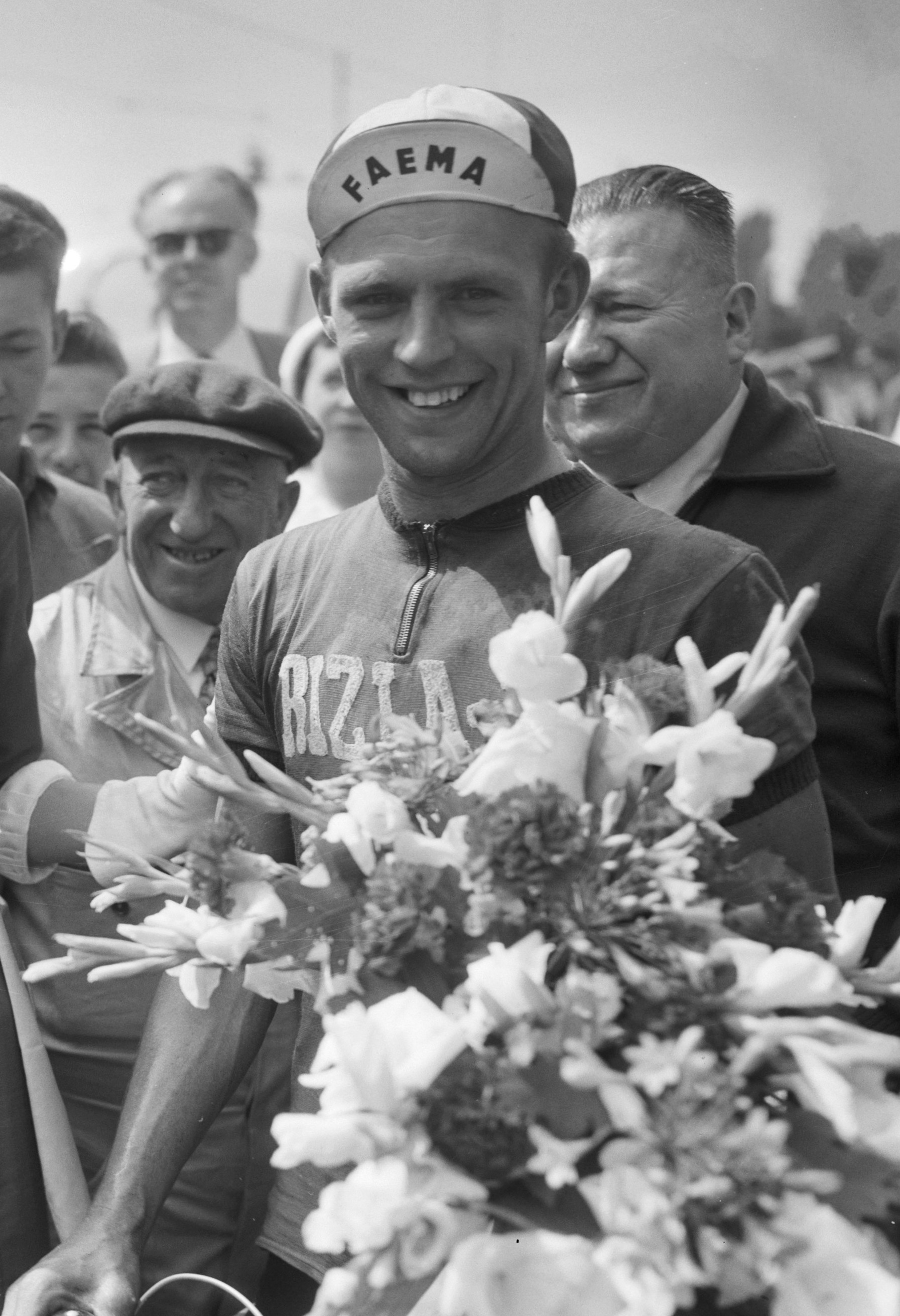
- Noël Foré in 1956

Personal information
- Full name: Noël Foré
- Born: 23 December 1932 Adegem, Belgium
- Died: 16 February 1994 (aged 61) Ghent, Belgium

Cycling career
- Sport: Cycling
- Discipline: Road
- Role: Rider

Major wins
- Paris–Roubaix (1959); Tour of Flanders (1963)
Medal record
Representing Belgium
Men's road bicycle racing
World Championships
| Bronze medal – third place | 1959 Zandvoort | Elite Men's Road Race |

Noël Foré (23 December 1932 – 16 February 1994) was a Belgian professional road bicycle racer. His greatest victories were Paris–Roubaix in 1959 and the Tour of Flanders in 1963.

== Palmarès ==
1957
Dwars door Vlaanderen/Dwars door België
1958
Tour of Belgium
1959
Paris–Roubaix
1962
Tour of Belgium
1963
E3-prijs
Kuurne–Brussels–Kuurne
Tour of Flanders
1967
Rund om Köln
