= 1959 Super Prestige Pernod =

- First edition of the Super Prestige Pernod

Details
- Dates: 4 March – 11 October
- Location: Europe
- Races: 11

Champions
- Individual champion: Henry Anglade (FRA) (Liberia–Hutchinson)

The 1959 Super Prestige Pernod was the first edition of the Super Prestige Pernod. It included 11 races all of which, apart from the World Championship race, started in France. It replaced the Challenge Desgrange-Colombo as the season-long competition for road bicycle racing. Henry Anglade won the overall title.

== Races ==
1959 Super Prestige Pernod races
Date	Race	Country	Winner	Team	Report
4 March – 14 March	Paris–Nice–Rome	France/Italy	Jean Graczyk (FRA)	Helyett–Leroux–Fynsec–Hutchinson	Report
12 April	Paris–Roubaix	France	Noël Foré (BEL)	Groene Leeuw–Sinalco–SAS	Report
19 April	Paris–Brussels	France/Belgium	Frans Schoubben (BEL)	Peugeot–BP–Dunlop	Report
3 May	Grand Prix Stan Ockers	France	René Privat (FRA)	Mercier–BP–Hutchinson	Report
24 May	Bordeaux–Paris	France	Louison Bobet (FRA)	Mercier–BP–Hutchinson	Report
1 June – 7 June	Critérium du Dauphiné Libéré	France	Henry Anglade (FRA)	Liberia–Hutchinson	Report
25 June – 18 July	Tour de France	France	Federico Bahamontes (ESP)	Spain	Report
28 July – 5 August	Tour de l'Ouest	France	Joseph Morvan (FRA)	Saint-Raphaël–R. Geminiani–Dunlop	Report
16 August	World Championships	Netherlands	André Darrigade (FRA)	France	Report
20 September	Grand Prix des Nations	France	Aldo Moser (ITA)	EMI	Report
11 October	Paris–Tours	France	Rik Van Looy (BEL)	Faema–Guerra	Report

== Final standings ==
1959 Super Prestige Pernod final standings (1–10)
Rank	Cyclist	Team	Points
1	Henry Anglade (FRA)	Liberia–Hutchinson	165
2	Roger Rivière (FRA)	Saint-Raphaël–R. Geminiani–Dunlop	150
3	Rik Van Looy (BEL)	Faema–Guerra	115
3	Noël Foré (BEL)	Groene Leeuw–Sinalco–SAS	115
5	Gérard Saint (FRA)	Rapha–R. Geminiani–Dunlop	105
6	Federico Bahamontes (ESP)	Tricofilina–Coppi	100
7	François Mahé (FRA)	Saint-Raphaël–R. Geminiani–Dunlop	90
8	Jacques Anquetil (FRA)	Helyett–Leroux–Fynsec–Hutchinson	87
9	André Darrigade (FRA)	Helyett–Leroux–Fynsec–Hutchinson	82
10	Joseph Morvan (FRA)	Saint-Raphaël–R. Geminiani–Dunlop	80
