= 1960 Super Prestige Pernod =

Road cycling competitions

- Second edition of the Super Prestige Pernod

Details
- Dates: 9 March – 16 October
- Location: Europe
- Races: 14

Champions
- Individual champion: Jean Graczyk (FRA) (Helyett–Leroux–Fynsec–Hutchinson)

The 1960 Super Prestige Pernod was a series of races that included fourteen road cycling events. It began with the Paris–Nice on 9 March and concluded with the Giro di Lombardia on 16 October. The overall title was won by French rider Jean Graczyk.

== Events ==
Races in the 1960 Super Prestige Pernod
Race	Date	Winner	Second	Third
(France) Paris–Nice	9–16 March	Raymond Impanis (BEL)	François Mahé (FRA)	Robert Cazala (FRA)
(Italy) Milan–San Remo	19 March	René Privat (FRA)	Jean Graczyk (FRA)	Yvo Molenaers (BEL)
(Belgium) Tour of Flanders	3 April	Arthur Decabooter (BEL)	Jean Graczyk (FRA)	Rik Van Looy (BEL)
(France) Paris–Roubaix	10 April	Pino Cerami (BEL)	Tino Sabbadini (FRA)	Miguel Poblet (ESP)
(France) / (Belgium) Paris–Brussels	24 April	Pierre Everaert (FRA)	André Darrigade (FRA)	Jean Graczyk (FRA)
(France) Grand Prix Stan Ockers	1 May	Shay Elliott (IRE)	Jos Hoevenaers (BEL)	René Privat (FRA)
(Belgium) Liège–Bastogne–Liège	8 May	Albertus Geldermans (NED)	Pierre Everaert (FRA)	Jef Planckaert (BEL)
(France) Bordeaux–Paris	29 May	Marcel Janssens (BEL)	François Mahé (FRA)	Petrus Oellibrandt (BEL)
(France) Critérium du Dauphiné Libéré	31 May – 6 June	Jean Dotto (FRA)	Raymond Mastrotto (FRA)	Gérard Thiélin (FRA)
Tour de France	26 June – 17 July	Gastone Nencini (ITA)	Graziano Battistini (ITA)	Jan Adriaensens (BEL)
(East Germany) World Championships	14 August	Rik Van Looy (BEL)	André Darrigade (FRA)	Pino Cerami (BEL)
(France) Grand Prix des Nations	18 September	Ercole Baldini (ITA)	Joseph Vloeberghs (BEL)	Raymond Mastrotto (FRA)
(France) Paris–Tours	2 October	Jo de Haan (NED)	Michel Stolker (NED)	Luis Otaño (ESP)
(Italy) Giro di Lombardia	16 October	Emile Daems (BEL)	Diego Ronchini (ITA)	Marino Fontana (ITA)

== Final standings ==
1960 Super Prestige Pernod final standings (1–10)
Rank	Cyclist	Team	Points
1	Jean Graczyk (FRA)	Helyett–Leroux–Fynsec–Hutchinson	160
2	Pino Cerami (BEL)	Peugeot–BP–Dunlop	141
3	Gastone Nencini (ITA)	Carpano	132
4	Raymond Mastrotto (FRA)	Rapha–Gitane–Dunlop	130
5	Rik Van Looy (BEL)	Faema	122
6	Jef Planckaert (BEL)	Wiel's–Flandria	119
7	André Darrigade (FRA)	Helyett–Leroux–Fynsec–Hutchinson	117
8	René Privat (FRA)	Mercier–BP–Hutchinson	116
9	François Mahé (FRA)	Rapha–Gitane–Dunlop	105
9	Jan Adriaensens (BEL)	Philco	105
