= Mopan =

Mopan may refer to:

- Mopán language, a Mayan language spoken in Belize and Guatemala
- Mopan people, an indigenous Maya people, whose native language is Mopan
- Mopan territory, a prehispanic polity of the Mopan people in present-day Belize and Guatemala
- Mopan River, in Belize's Cayo district
- SS Mopan, a British cargo liner intercepted and sunk by the German battleship Admiral Scheer on November 5, 1940
- Multilateral Organisation Performance Assessment Network (MOPAN), a special body of the Organisation for Economic Co-operation and Development (OECD)

== See also ==
- Mopane (disambiguation)
- Mopani (disambiguation)
