= 1959 Liège–Bastogne–Liège =

Race details
- Dates: 26 April 1959
- Stages: 1
- Distance: 240 km (150 mi)
- Winning time: 6h 45' 30"

Results
	Winner	Fred De Bruyne (BEL)	(Peugeot–BP–Dunlop)
	Second	Frans Schoubben (BEL)	(Elvé–Peugeot)
	Third	Frans De Mulder (BEL)	(Groene Leeuw–Sinalco–SAS)

The 1959 Liège–Bastogne–Liège was the 45th edition of the Liège–Bastogne–Liège cycle race and was held on 26 April 1959. The race started and finished in Liège. The race was won by Fred De Bruyne of the Peugeot team.

== General classification ==
Final general classification

Rank	Rider	Team	Time
1	Fred De Bruyne (BEL)	Peugeot–BP–Dunlop	6h 45' 30"
2	Frans Schoubben (BEL)	Peugeot–BP–Dunlop	+ 0"
3	Frans De Mulder (BEL)	Groene Leeuw–Sinalco–SAS	+ 3"
4	Marcel Ernzer (LUX)	EMI	+ 1' 42"
5	Angelo Conterno (ITA)	Carpano	+ 1' 42"
6	Jan Zagers (BEL)	Libertas–Eura Drinks	+ 2' 37"
7	André Vlayen (BEL)	Peugeot–BP–Dunlop	+ 2' 37"
8	Frans Aerenhouts (BEL)	Mercier–BP–Hutchinson	+ 2' 37"
9	Gilbert Desmet (BEL)	Faema–Guerra	+ 3' 50"
10	Willy Vannitsen (BEL)	Urago	+ 4' 24"
