= Fred De Bruyne =

Belgian cyclist and TV sports commentator (1930-1994)

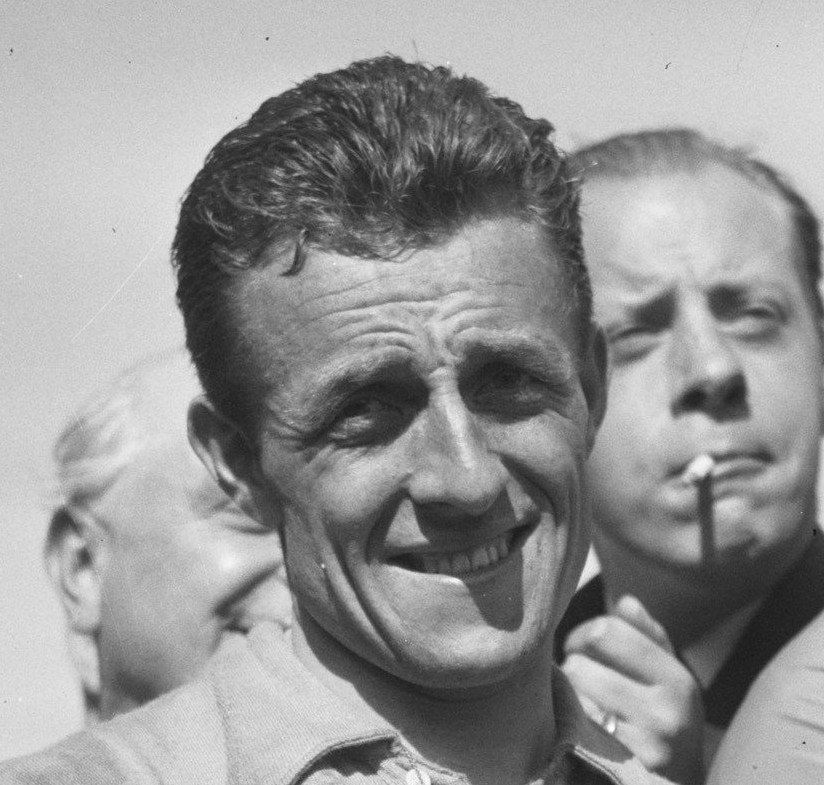
- De Bruyne at the 1956 Tour de France

Personal information
- Full name: Fred De Bruyne
- Born: Alfred De Bruyne; 21 October 1930 Berlare, Belgium
- Died: 4 February 1994 (aged 63) Seillans, France

Cycling career
- Sport: Cycling
- Disciplines: Road, track
- Role: Rider
- Rider type: Classics specialist

Amateur team
- 1953: Independent

Professional teams
- 1953-1956: Mercier-Hutchinson
- 1957: Carpano-Coppi
- 1958: Carpano
- 1959: Peugeot-BP
- 1960: Carpano
- 1961: Barati

Managerial teams
- 1978: Flandria–Velda–Lano
- 1979-1982: DAF Trucks
- 1983: Jacky Aernoudt Meubelen

Major wins
- Grand Tours Tour de France 6 individual stages (1954, 1956) Other stage races Paris–Nice (1956, 1958) One-day races and Classics Milan–San Remo (1956) Liège–Bastogne–Liège (1956, 1958, 1959) Tour of Flanders (1957) Paris–Roubaix (1957) Paris–Tours (1957) Sassari–Cagliari (1957) Kuurne–Brussels–Kuurne (1961) Other Challenge Desgrange-Colombo (1956, 1957, 1958)

Alfred De Bruyne (21 October 1930 – 4 February 1994) was a Belgian champion road cyclist. He won six Tour de France stages early in his career and went on to win many other Monuments and stage races.

De Bruyne had a great deal of success early in his career during the Tour de France. 1953 was his first Tour, his best result was making one stage podium, on stage 5 from Dieppe to Caen. In 1954 he finished 2nd on the final stage into Paris and won three stages along the way. In 1955 he didn't win any stages, but ended up with the highest overall classification he would ever have which was 17th. In 1956, De Bruyne won three stages in the first half of the Tour, but slowed a bit in the second half and could not add to this total. Also in 1956 he won Milan–San Remo and Liège–Bastogne–Liège, as well as the stage race Paris–Nice early in the season. In 1957 De Bruyne abandoned the Tour for the first time in his career. He won both Paris–Roubaix and Paris–Tours that year. In 1958 he rode the Giro for the first time and didn't win any stages and finished 16th overall. He won Paris–Nice, Liège–Bastogne–Liège and came in the top 10 of Gent–Wevelgem, La Flèche Wallonne, Paris–Roubaix, Paris-Tours and Milan San Remo.

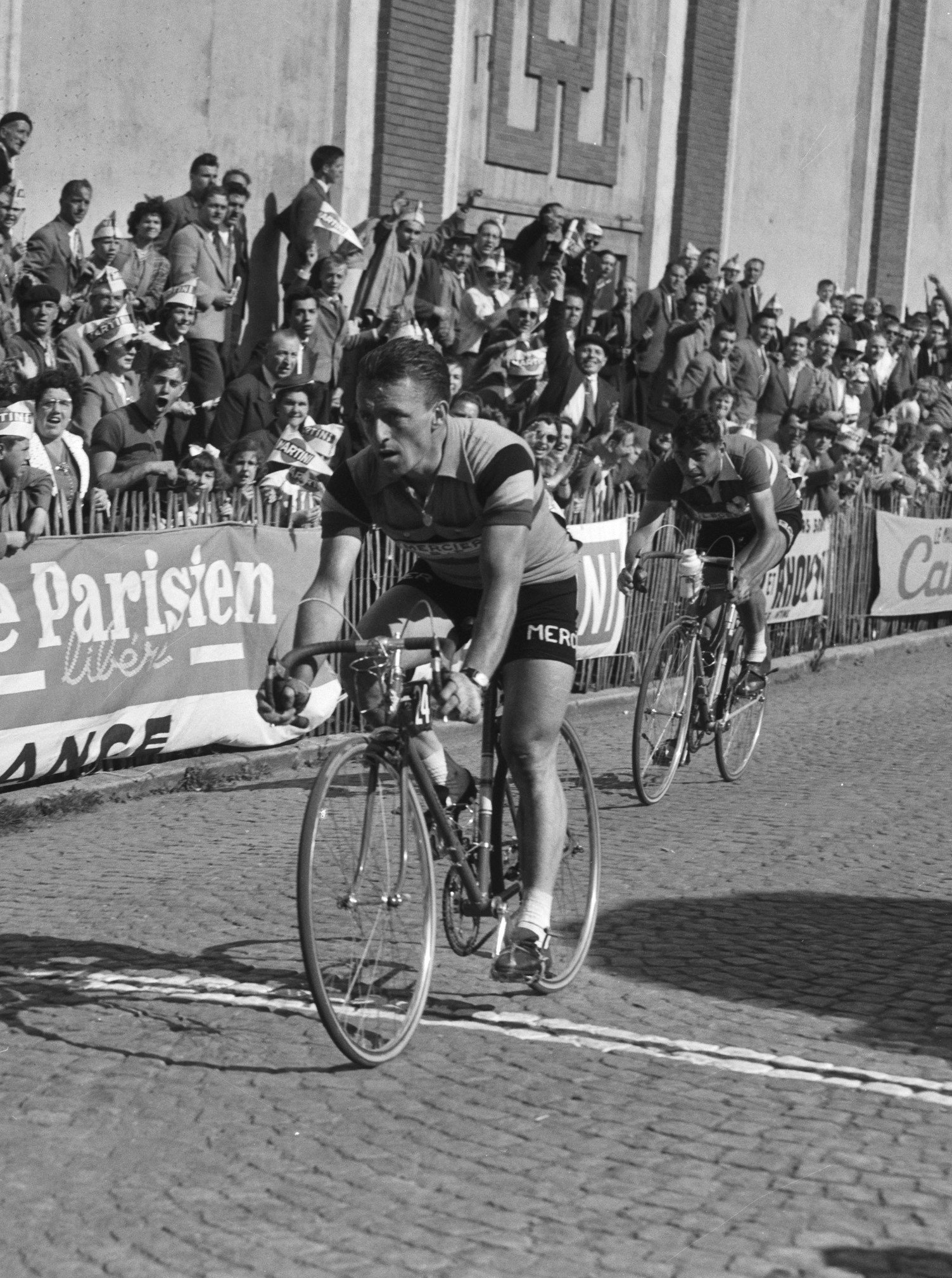
De Bruyne winning stage 2 of the 1956 Tour de France.

Fred De Bruyne also won the Challenge Desgrange-Colombo competition three years running, from 1956 to 1958. This was the forerunner of the Super Prestige Pernod, later replaced by the UCI Ranking Points List.

After his professional cycling career he went on to write several books about some of the most important Belgian cyclists of his era and became a popular TV sports commentator, a team manager, and finally a spokesman for the Panasonic cycling team.

In 1988 he retired and moved with his wife to the Provence in France. Six years later, in February 1994, De Bruyne died of a heart attack after a lingering illness.

== Riding style ==
De Bruyne cycled using competition insight, and attacked when he felt sure. He was explosive and fast. In contrast to his gentle nature, the talkative De Bruyne was maniacal as a cyclist. ''On the bike, I was actually a beast'', De Bruyne once let slip. He was not known as the top talent, but his intelligence and innate discipline enabled him to amass a good record.

== Major results ==
=== Road ===
1953
1st Tour of Flanders independents
1st Bosbeek-Brussegem independents
1st Blanden independents
2nd Gent-Wevelgem independents
1953
1st Gentbrugge
1954
1st GP Berlare
Tour de France

1st Stages 8, 13 and 22

1st Omloop van Oost-Vlaanderen
1st Criterium of East-Flanders
2nd GP Stad Vilvoorde
2nd Schelde–Dender–Leie
4th Circuit des six provinces (fr)

1st Stage 2

6th Paris–Tours
9th Road race, UCI World Championships
1955
1st Omloop van Midden-België
1st GP Frans Melckenbeek (nl)
2nd Giro di Lombardia
2nd Paris–Tours
2nd Dwars door Vlaanderen

1st Stage 2

3rd Tour du Sud-Est

1st Stage 4

3rd Grand Prix du Midi Libre
4th Nationale Sluitingsprijs
6th Brussels–Ingooigem
1956
1st Milan–San Remo
1st Liège–Bastogne–Liège
1st Overall Paris–Nice

1st Stages 1 and 5

Tour de France

1st Stages 1, 6 and 10

1st Challenge Desgrange-Colombo
2nd Boucles de l'Aulne
2nd Paris–Roubaix
4th Paris–Tours
5th Road race, UCI World Championships
5th Bordeaux–Paris
9th Giro di Lombardia
9th Paris–Brussels
1957
1st Tour of Flanders
1st Paris–Roubaix
1st Paris–Tours
1st GP Berlare
1st Sassari–Cagliari
1st Challenge Desgrange-Colombo
2nd Milan–San Remo
2nd Milano–Torino
4th Paris–Brussels
5th Road race, UCI World Championships
8th Roma–Napoli–Roma

1st Stage 8

1958
1st Liège–Bastogne–Liège
1st Overall Paris–Nice
1st GP Berlare
1st Challenge Desgrange-Colombo
2nd Paris–Tours
2nd Boucles de l'Aulne
2nd Omloop van Limburg
3rd Gent–Wevelgem
4th La Flèche Wallonne
4th Paris–Brussels
6th Milan–San Remo
6th Gran Premio di Lugano
6th Paris–Roubaix
7th Giro del Lazio
10th Tour of Flanders
1959
1st Liège–Bastogne–Liège
2nd Omloop Het Volk
2nd Boucles de l'Aulne
5th Bordeaux–Paris
6th Paris–Roubaix
6th Paris–Brussels
1960
8th Schelde–Dender–Leie
1961
1st Kuurne–Brussels–Kuurne
5th Overall Giro di Sardegna

=== Track ===
1955
3rd Six days of Ghent (with Reginald Arnold)
1957
1st Six days of Ghent (with Rik Van Steenbergen)
3rd Six Days of Paris (with Willy Vannitsen & Leon Van Daele)
1958
2nd Six Days of Brussels (with Reginald Arnold)
1959
1st Six days of Ghent (with Rik Van Steenbergen)

== Honours ==
- A square, Place Fred De Bruyne in Seillans, France
- A race, Memorial Fred De Bruyne in Berlare, Belgium
- A monument in Berlare, Belgium
- A cycling route In het wiel van Fred De Bruyne in Berlare, Belgium

== Books by Fred De Bruyne ==
Fred de Bruyne wrote following books (in Dutch) about famous cyclists:

- Rik Van Steenbergen, 1963
- Rik Van Looy, 1963
- Patrick Sercu, 1965
- Peter Post, 1965
- De memoires van Fred De Bruyne, 1978
