= 1956 Giro di Lombardia =

Race details
- Dates: 21 October 1956
- Stages: 1
- Distance: 240 km (149.1 mi)
- Winning time: 6h 14' 20"

Results
	Winner	André Darrigade (FRA)	(Bianchi–Pirelli)
	Second	Fausto Coppi (ITA)	(Carpano–Coppi)
	Third	Fiorenzo Magni (ITA)	(Nivea–Fuchs–Clément)

The 1956 Giro di Lombardia was the 50th edition of the Giro di Lombardia cycle race and was held on 21 October 1956. The race started and finished in Milan. The race was won by André Darrigade of the Bianchi team.

== General classification ==
Final general classification (Note: Rik Van Looy arrived 4th, but was disqualified.)

Rank	Rider	Team	Time
1	André Darrigade (FRA)	Bianchi–Pirelli	6h 14' 20"
2	Fausto Coppi (ITA)	Carpano–Coppi	s.t.
3	Fiorenzo Magni (ITA)	Nivea–Fuchs–Clément	s.t.
4	Giorgio Albani (ITA)	Legnano	s.t.
5	Bruno Monti (ITA)	Atala	s.t.
6	Roger Decock (BEL)	Faema–Guerra	s.t.
7	Louison Bobet (FRA)	Bobet–BP–Hutchinson	s.t.
8	Diego Ronchini (ITA)	Bianchi–Pirelli	s.t.
9	Alfred De Bruyne (BEL)	Mercier–BP–Hutchinson	s.t.
10	Aimé Van Avermaet (BEL)	Independent	s.t.
