= 1961 Paris–Tours =

Race details
- Dates: 8 October 1961
- Stages: 1
- Distance: 267 km (165.9 mi)
- Winning time: 6h 57' 53"

Results
	Winner	Joseph Wouters (BEL)	(Solo–Van Steenbergen)
	Second	Gilbert Desmet (BEL)	(Carpano)
	Third	Anatole Novak (FRA)	(Alcyon–Leroux)

The 1961 Paris–Tours was the 55th edition of the Paris–Tours cycle race and was held on 8 October 1961. The race started in Paris and finished in Tours. The race was won by Joseph Wouters of the Solo team.

== General classification ==
Final general classification

Rank	Rider	Team	Time
1	Joseph Wouters (BEL)	Solo–Van Steenbergen	6h 57' 53"
2	Gilbert Desmet (BEL)	Carpano	+ 0"
3	Anatole Novak (FRA)	Alcyon–Leroux	+ 2"
4	Raymond Impanis (BEL)	Faema	+ 2"
5	Ludo Janssens (BEL)	Solo–Van Steenbergen	+ 5"
6	Arthur Decabooter (BEL)	Groene Leeuw–SAS–Sinalco	+ 15"
7	Michel Stolker (NED)	Helyett–Fynsec–Hutchinson	+ 15"
8	Gustaaf De Smet (BEL)	Groene Leeuw–SAS–Sinalco	+ 19"
9	Nino Defilippis (ITA)	Carpano	+ 19"
10	Jo de Roo (NED)	Helyett–Fynsec–Hutchinson	+ 19"
