= 1959 Giro di Lombardia =

Race details
- Dates: 18 October 1959
- Stages: 1
- Distance: 240 km (149.1 mi)
- Winning time: 5h 52' 05"

Results
	Winner	Rik Van Looy (BEL)	(Faema–Guerra)
	Second	Willy Vannitsen (BEL)	(Urago-d'Alessandro)
	Third	Miguel Poblet (ESP)	(Ignis–Frejus)

The 1959 Giro di Lombardia was the 53rd edition of the Giro di Lombardia cycle race and was held on 18 October 1959. The race started and finished in Milan. The race was won by Rik Van Looy of the Faema–Guerra team.

== General classification ==
Final general classification

Rank	Rider	Team	Time
1	Rik Van Looy (BEL)	Faema–Guerra	5h 52' 05"
2	Willy Vannitsen (BEL)	Ghigi–Ganna	s.t.
3	Miguel Poblet (ESP)	Ignis–Frejus	s.t.
4	Alessandro Fantini (ITA)	Atala–Pirelli–Lygi	s.t.
5	Federico Galeaz (ITA)	Torpado	s.t.
6	André Darrigade (FRA)	Helyett–Leroux–Fynsec–Hutchinson	s.t.
7	Dino Bruni (ITA)	Ignis–Frejus	s.t.
8	Oreste Magni (ITA)	EMI	s.t.
9	Rino Benedetti (ITA)	Ghigi–Ganna	s.t.
10	Walter Martin (ITA)	Carpano	s.t.
