= Giuseppe Favero =

Italian cyclist (1931–2020)

Personal information
- Born: 20 December 1931 Settimo Torinese, Kingdom of Italy
- Died: 9 September 2020 (aged 88) Settimo Torinese, Italy

Cycling career
- Sport: Cycling

Professional teams
- 1953–1957: Bianchi
- 1958–1959: Carpano

Giuseppe Favero (20 December 1931 – 9 September 2020) was an Italian cyclist.

== Biography ==
As an amateur cyclist, Favero won the Milan-Bussero race. He turned professional in 1953, signing with Bianchi. During this time, he was teammates with Fausto Coppi and Jacques Anquetil. Twice he came in 2nd place in a stage of the Giro d'Italia but failed to ever win one. He won third place in the 1954 Milan–San Remo behind Rik Van Steenbergen and Francis Anastasi. In 1956, he participated in the Vuelta a España, in which he would finish 27th. He notably won a stage of the 1958 Paris–Nice. After his retirement, Favero directed two cycling clubs in Turin: Baratti-Milan and Ibac.

Giuseppe Faveri died in Settimo Torinese on 9 September 2020 at the age of 88.
