= 1958 Liège–Bastogne–Liège =

Race details
- Dates: 27 April 1958
- Stages: 1
- Distance: 246 km (153 mi)
- Winning time: 6h 56' 00"

Results
	Winner	Fred De Bruyne (BEL)	(Carpano)
	Second	Jan Zagers (BEL)	(Libertas–Dr. Mann)
	Third	Joseph Theuns (BEL)	(Dossche Sport)

The 1958 Liège–Bastogne–Liège was the 44th edition of the Liège–Bastogne–Liège cycle race and was held on 27 April 1958. The race started and finished in Liège. The race was won by Fred De Bruyne of the Carpano team.

== General classification ==
Final general classification

Rank	Rider	Team	Time
1	Fred De Bruyne (BEL)	Carpano	6h 56' 00"
2	Jan Zagers (BEL)	Libertas–Dr. Mann	+ 0"
3	Joseph Theuns (BEL)	Dossche Sport	+ 0"
4	Alfons Van den Brande (BEL)	Libertas–Dr. Mann	+ 0"
5	Raymond Impanis (BEL)	Elvé–Peugeot–Marvan	+ 40"
6	René Van Meenen (BEL)	Splendor	+ 40"
7	Marcel Ernzer (LUX)	Faema–Guerra	+ 40"
8	Claude Colette (FRA)	Peugeot–BP–Dunlop	+ 42"
9	André Vlayen (BEL)	Ghigi–Coppi	+ 42"
10	Rik Van Looy (BEL)	Faema–Guerra	+ 1' 10"
