= Mopane (disambiguation) =

Mopane, Colophospermum mopane, is a tree in the legume family that grows in southern Africa.

Mopane may also refer to:

- Guibourtia coleosperma, the false mopane, a tree species
- Gonimbrasia belina, the mopane worm, a butterfly species
- Plebeina armata, the mopane bee, a bee species

== See also ==
- Mopani (disambiguation)
