= Paravespa =

Scientific classification
- Domain: Eukaryota
- Kingdom: Animalia
- Phylum: Arthropoda
- Class: Insecta
- Order: Hymenoptera
- Family: Vespidae
- Subfamily: Eumeninae
- Genus: Paravespa; Radoszkowski, 1886

Type species
- Paravespa quadricolor (Moravitz, 1885)

Species
- see text

Genus of wasps

Paravespa is an Afrotropical and Palearctic genus of potter wasps.

== Species ==
The following species are classified under Paravespa:

- Paravespa africana Carpenter, Gusenleitner & Madl 2010
- Paravespa bonellii Giordani Soika, 1982
- Paravespa dewittei Giordani Soika, 1960
- Paravespa gestroi Magretti, 1884
- Paravespa grandis (Morawitz, 1885)
- Paravespa mima Giordani Soika, 1960
- Paravespa mimetica (Schulthess, 1923)
- Paravespa minutepunctata Giordani Soika, 1960
- Paravespa nairobiensis (Giordani Soika, 1935)
- Paravespa nigrifrons Giordani Soika, 1960
- Paravespa occidentalis Giordani Soika, 1987
- Paravespa pretoriensis (Giordani Soika, 1935)
- Paravespa quadricolor (Morawitz, 1885)
- Paravespa rex (Schulthess, 1923)
- Paravespa spinigera (Schulthess, 1914)
- Paravespa violaceipennnis Giordani Soika, 1960
- Paravespa zebroides (Meade-Waldo, 1915)
