= Willy Vannitsen =

Belgian cyclist

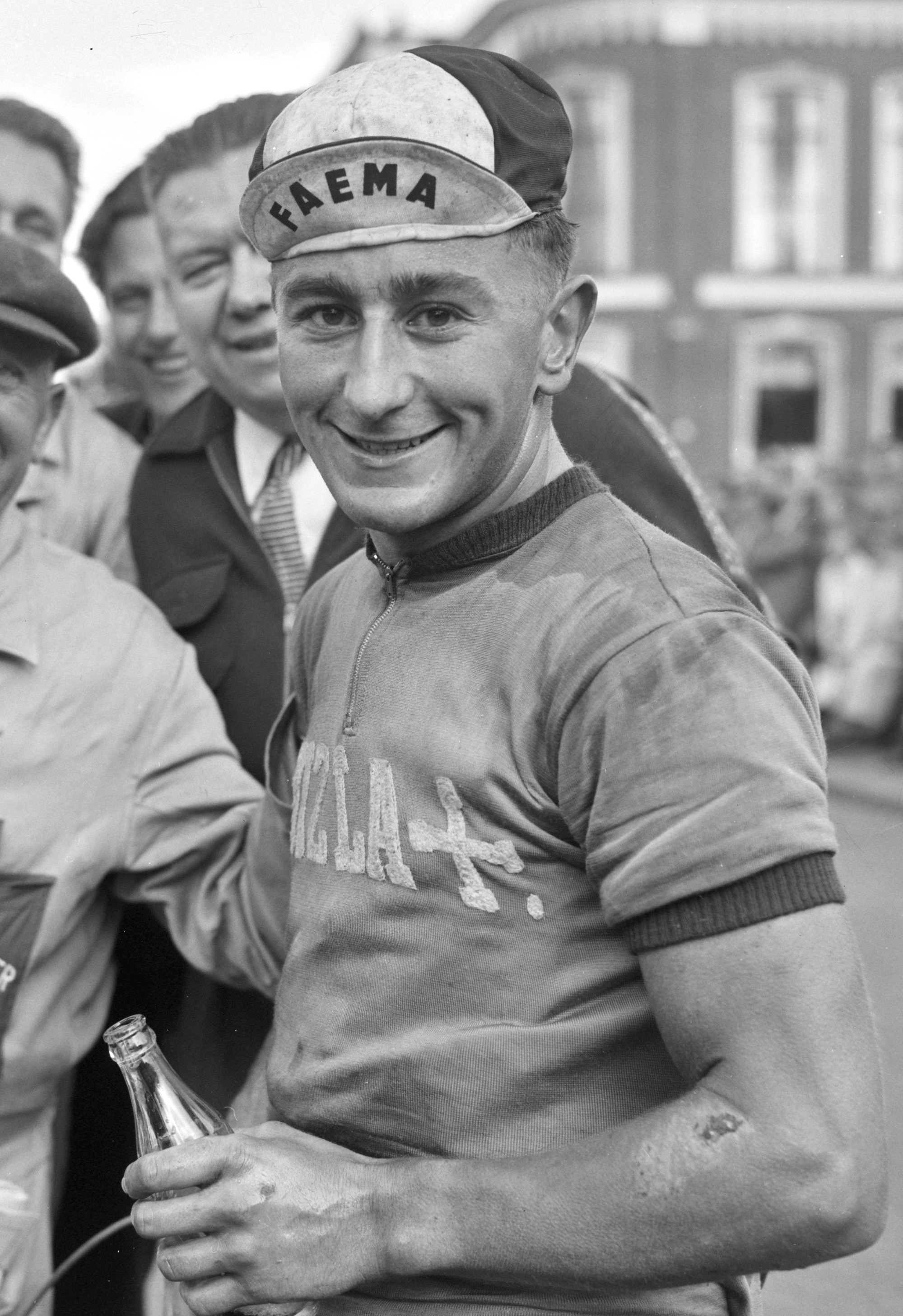
- Vannitsen in 1956

Personal information
- Full name: Willy Vannitsen
- Born: 8 February 1935 Jeuk, Belgium
- Died: 19 August 2001 (aged 66) Tienen, Belgium

Cycling career
- Sport: Cycling
- Discipline: Road
- Role: Rider

Professional teams
- 1955: Van Hauwaert-Maes Pils
- 1956: Faema-Guerra
- 1957: Peugeot-BP-Dunlop
- 1958: Ghigi-Coppi
- 1959: Ghigi-Ganna
- 1960: Carpano
- 1961: Baratti-Milano
- 1962: Wiel's-Groene Leeuw
- 1963: Peugeot-BP-Englebert
- 1964: Flandria-Roméo
- 1965: Ford France-Gitane
- 1966: Mann-Grundig

Major wins
- Grand Tours Tour de France 2 individual stages (1962) Giro d'Italia 1 individual stage (1958) One-day races and Classics Giro di Toscana (1958) La Flèche Wallonne (1961) Scheldeprijs (1965) Ronde van Limburg (1957, 1960) Other Acht van Chaam (1962)

Willy Vannitsen (8 February 1935 – 19 August 2001) was a Belgian professional road bicycle racer. In 1962, Vannitsen won two stages in the 1962 Tour de France.

== Early life ==
Vannitsen was born on 8 February 1935 in Jeuk, Limburg. In his time, Vannitsen was known as one of the fastest legs in the peloton. In the youth categories he won more than 100 competitions. In 1951, he became Belgian champion with the novices, ahead of Frans Schoubben. As an enthusiast, he won 70 races in two years (1952, 1953).

== Career ==
Vannitsen made his debut as a professional cyclist with Peugeot in 1954, with four victories. In his entire professional career (1954-1966) he achieved a total of 91 victories. His most honored year was 1958, when he received the victory flowers 14 times. There is one classic victory on his palmares: the Flèche Wallonne in 1961. Vannitsen was part of a leading group, which he was able to join in the full final in the wake of Jacques Anquetil. The Belgian made it in the sprint, ahead of the French race sprinter Jean Graczyk.

Vannitsen won two Tour stages and one stage in the Giro. His other most important victories include the Ronde van Limburg (1957 and 1960), the Omloop van Limburg (1958, 1961 and 1966), the Omloop van Centraal Brabant, Milano–Vignola (1961), Borgloon, Aalst and Vorst–Brussels (1962), the Grand Prix of Dortmund and Zonhoven-Antwerp-Zonhoven (1963), the Scheldeprijs (1965) and the famous Acht van Chaam in 1962.

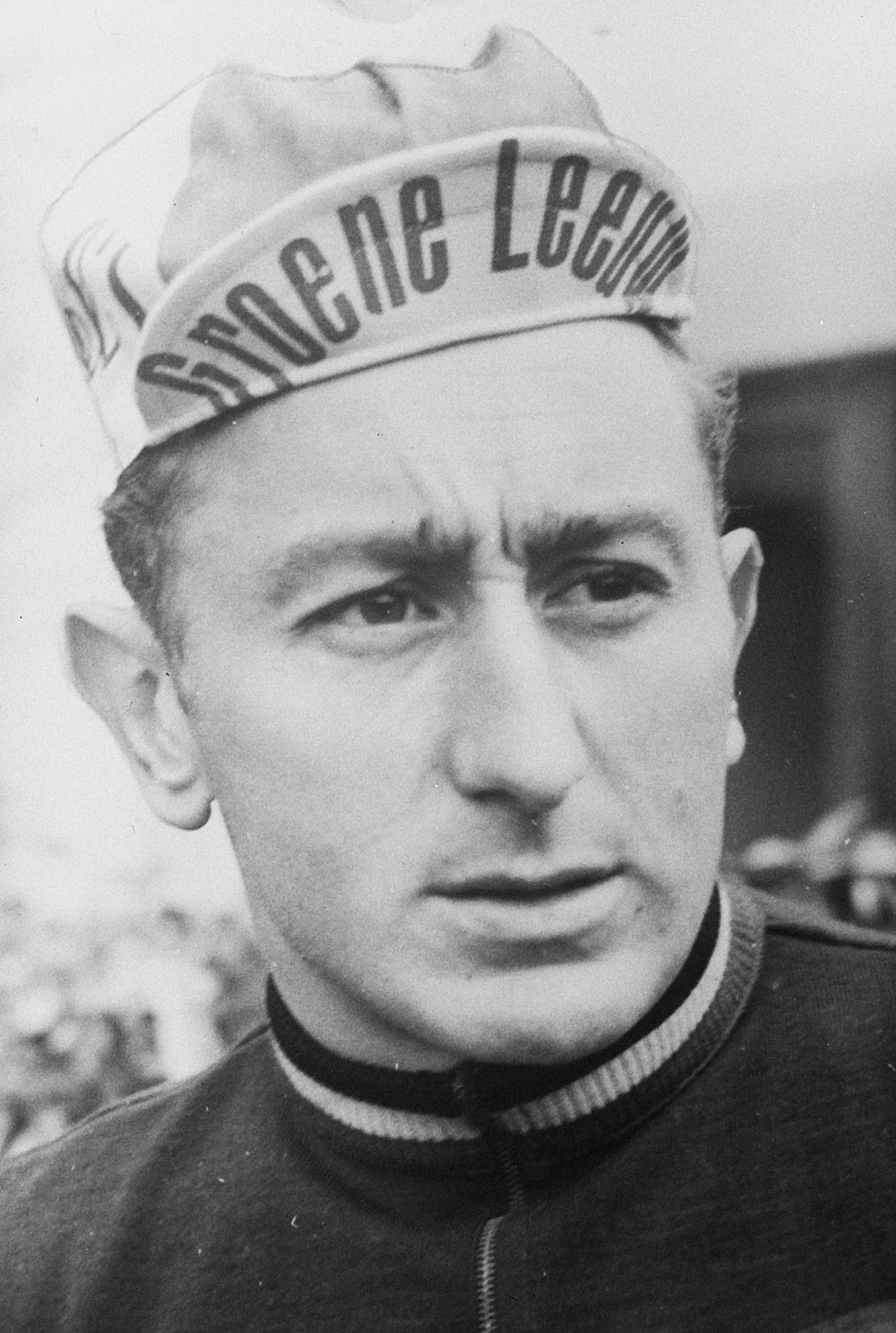
Willy Vannitsen in 1962

His most important places of honor are a second place in Paris–Brussels in 1959 behind Frans Schoubben, in the Tour of Lombardy behind Rik Van Looy, in the Belgian championship in 1960 behind Frans De Mulder, and a third place in 1965 Paris–Roubaix behind Rik Van Looy and Edward Sels.

Willy Vannitsen finished 70th in his first Tour de France in 1962. That year he won the 10th and 15th stage. In his three other Tour participations (1963, 1964 and 1966) he gave up every time. He also rode the Tour of Italy four times, each time leaving the race early, but in 1958 he won the first stage, which earned him a day in pink.

Vannitsen also took part in the Tour of the Netherlands twice. In 1956 he finished fifth and won a stage. In 1965 he was 34th. He rode the Tour of Belgium five times: 4th in 1955 with a stage victory, retired in 1959 but a stage victory, 73rd in 1965 and 13th in 1966.

Vannitsen was also quite good on the track. He won two Six Days: in 1957 in Brussels, together with fellow countryman Rik Van Looy and in 1961 in Antwerp with the same Van Looy and the Dutchman Peter Post.

== Death ==
At the age of 64, Vannitsen suffered acerebral haemorrhage. He completely recovered, but died two years later after a fall.

== Major results ==
=== Road ===
1951
1st Road race, National Novice Championships
1953
1st Stages 1 & 5 Tour of Belgium amateurs
1st Upsala
1st Vaasteras
2nd Omloop der Vlaamse Gewesten amateurs
1954
1st Stages 1, 2, 6 & 8 Tour of Belgium amateurs
1st Stages 4 & 5 Tour of Limburg amateurs
1st Heistse Pijl
1st Antwerpse Havenpijl
1st Hoegaarden
1st Momalle
1st Zele
3rd De Drie Zustersteden
1955
1st Brussegem
1st Geel
1st Heusden–Limburg
1st Tessenderlo
1st Omloop van de Gete
1st De Drie Zustersteden
1st Grote Bevrijdingsprijs
1st Itegem
1st Circuit de la Gette
3rd Flèche Hesbignonne
4th Overall Tour of Belgium

1st Stage 1

1956
1st Omloop van de Fruitstreek Alken
1st Beerse
1st Herent
1st Jeuk
1st Wellen
1st Beersel
4th Milan–San Remo
5th Overall Tour of the Netherlands

1st Stage 2

7th Overall Driedaagse van Antwerpen

1st Stage 1

1957
1st Omloop van de Fruitstreek Alken
1st Overall Tour of Limburg
1st Beerse
1st Brazzaville
1st Houthalen-Helchteren
1st Lommel
1st Londerzeel
1st Loverval
1st Oviedo
1st Putte-Mechelen
1st Overpelt
1958
1st Omloop van Limburg
1st Giro di Toscana
Giro d'Italia:

Winner Stage 1
Held after Stage 1

Paris–Nice

Winner Stages 2 & 3

1st Fontanelas
1st Melsele
1st Paal
1st Sint-Truiden
1st Wavre
1st Vijfbergenomloop
1st Heusden Limburg
1st Florenville
1st Hoepertingen
1st Zele
5th La Flèche Wallonne
1959
1st Berlare
1st Beverlo
1st Puurs
1st Rummen
1st Wingene
1st Nazareth
1st Tienen
2nd Giro di Lombardia
2nd Paris–Brussels
2nd Milano-Mantova
1960
1st Overall Tour of Limburg
2nd National Championships Road race
1st Averbode
1st Stage 1 Brussels–Sint-Truiden
1st Koersel, Koersel
1st Lommel
6th Circuit de Louest
1961
1st La Flèche Wallonne
1st Gran Premio Bruno Beghelli
1st Milano–Vignola
1st Tre Valli Varesine
1st Primus Classic
1st Molenstede
1st Oedelem
1st Omloop van Limburg
1st Omloop van Centraal-Brabant
1st Critérium of Winterthur
1st Critérium of Charleroi
1st Eke
1st Wingene
8th Brussels–Ingooigem
9th Super Prestige Pernod
1962
Tour de France

1st Stages 10 & 15

Tour de Luxembourg

1st Stage 2

1st Aalst
1st Acht van Chaam
1st Borgloon
1st Omloop Groot Oostende
1st Critérium of Peyrehorade
1st Vorst – Brussel
5th GP Roeselare
7th Tour of Flanders
7th Gent–Wevelgem
1963
1st Bree
1st GP Union Dortmund
1st Helchteren
1st Omloop van de Fruitstreek Alken
1st Zonhoven – Antwerpen – Zonhoven
4th Tour of Flanders
7th Gent–Wevelgem
8th Tour de Wallonie
1965
1st Scheldeprijs
1st Opgrimbie
1966
1st Omloop van Limburg

== Track ==
1955
3rd National Track Championships Sprint
1956
2nd National Track Championships Sprint
1957
1st Six Days of Brussels (with Rik Van Looy)
2nd National Track Championships Sprint
3rd Six Days of Ghent (with Gerrit Schulte)
3rd Six Days of Antwerp (with Rik Van Steenbergen and Emiel Severeyns)
3rd Six Days of Paris (with Leon Van Daele) and Alfred De Bruyne)
1960
2nd National Track Championships Sprint
1961
1st Six Days of Antwerp (with Rik Van Looy and Peter Post)
1963
European Championships

2nd Madison (with Peter Post)

2nd Six Days of Antwerp (with Reginald Arnold and Peter Post)
3rd National Track Championships Madison
3rd National Track Championships Omnium
1965
2nd National Track Championships Madison
