= 1956 Liège–Bastogne–Liège =

Race details
- Dates: 6 May 1956
- Stages: 1
- Distance: 257 km (160 mi)
- Winning time: 7h 03' 45"

Results
	Winner	Fred De Bruyne (BEL)
	Second	Richard Van Genechten (BEL)
	Third	Alex Close (BEL)

The 1956 Liège–Bastogne–Liège was the 42nd edition of the Liège–Bastogne–Liège cycle race and was held on 6 May 1956. The race started and finished in Liège. The race was won by Fred De Bruyne.

== General classification ==
Final general classification

Rank	Rider	Time
1	Fred De Bruyne (BEL)	7h 03' 45"
2	Richard Van Genechten (BEL)	+ 0"
3	Alex Close (BEL)	+ 1' 16"
4	André Vlayen (BEL)	+ 1' 44"
5	Rik Van Looy (BEL)	+ 1' 44"
6	Désiré Keteleer (BEL)	+ 1' 44"
7	Pino Cerami (BEL)	+ 1' 44"
8	Jean Vliegen (BEL)	+ 1' 44"
9	Jean Forestier (FRA)	+ 1' 44"
10	Wim van Est (NED)	+ 1' 44"
