= Omloop van Limburg =

Belgian cycling race

Race details
- Date: May, June
- Region: Flanders, Belgium
- English name: Circuit of Limburg
- Local name(s): Omloop van Limburg (in Dutch), Circuit du Limbourg (in French)
- Discipline: Road
- Competition: Cat. 1.2
- Type: One-day race

History
- First edition: 1941
- Editions: 21
- Final edition: 1969
- First winner: Gorgon Hermans (BEL)
- Most wins: Willy Vannitsen (BEL); (3 wins)
- Final winner: Jan Boonen (BEL)

The Omloop van Limburg was a Belgian cycling race organized for the last time in 1969.

The course, variating between 145 and 258 km, was situated in the Limburg province. Hasselt was both start and finish place, except for 1965 when the race finished in Genk.

The competition's roll of honor includes the successes of Rik Van Steenbergen. The record of victories, however, belongs to Willy Vannitsen.

== Winners ==
Year	Winner	Second	Third
1941	(Belgium) Gorgon Hermans	(Belgium) Albert Ramon	(Belgium) Adolf Van den Bossche
1942-1947	No race		
1948	(Belgium) Rik Evens	(Belgium) Maurice Holsbeek	(Belgium) Karel Van Dormael
1949	No race		
1950	(Belgium) Lode Anthonis	(Belgium) Frans Gielen	(Belgium) Julien Janssens
1951	(Belgium) Ernest Sterckx	(Belgium) Edward Peeters	(Belgium) Georges Claes
1952	(Netherlands) Wim Van Est	(Netherlands) Frans van der Zande	(Netherlands) Henk Faanhof
1953	(Belgium) Léopold Schaeken	(Belgium) Frans Loyaerts	(Belgium) Eugeen Van Roosbroeck
1954	(Belgium) André Vlayen	(Belgium) Frans Gielen	(Belgium) Jozef De Feyter
1955	(Belgium) Rik Van Steenbergen	(Belgium) Ernest Sterckx	(Belgium) Marcel Hendrikx
1956	(Belgium) Rik Van Steenbergen	(Belgium) Marcel Ryckaert	(Belgium) Rik Luyten
1957	(Italy) Jean Pasinetti	(Belgium) Willem Hendriks	(Belgium) Joseph Verachtert
1958	(Belgium) Willy Vannitsen	(Belgium) Alfred De Bruyne	(Belgium) Willem Hendriks
1959	(Belgium) Rik Luyten	(Belgium) Camiel Buysse	(Belgium) Roger Baens
1960	(Belgium) Martin Van Geneugden	(Germany) Hans Junkermann	(Belgium) Etienne De Baar
1961	(Belgium) Willy Vannitsen	(Belgium) Gilbert Maes	(Belgium) Gustaaf Desmet
1962	(Belgium) Emile Daems	(Belgium) Jean Simon	(Belgium) Jozef Wouters
1963	(Belgium) Ludo Janssens	(Belgium) Robert Seneca	(Belgium) Joseph Hoevenaers
1964	(Belgium) Walter Muylaert	(Belgium) Edward Sels	(United Kingdom) Michael Wright
1965	(Belgium) Raymond Vrancken	(Belgium) Alfons Hermans	(Belgium) Joseph Haeseldonckx
1966	(Belgium) Willy Vannitsen	(Belgium) Frans Brands	(Belgium) Jan Nolmans
1967	No race		
1968	(Belgium) Michel Jacquemin	(Italy) Pasquale De Luca	(Belgium) Guy Vallée
1969	(Belgium) Jan Boonen	(Belgium) Julien Verstrepen	(Netherlands) Cornelis Schuuring
