= 1957 Paris–Roubaix =

Cycling race

Race details
- Dates: 7 April 1957
- Stages: 1
- Distance: 263 km (163.4 mi)
- Winning time: 7h 15' 19"

Results
	Winner	Alfred De Bruyne (BEL)
	Second	Rik Van Steenbergen (BEL)
	Third	Leon van Daele (BEL)

The 1957 Paris–Roubaix was the 55th edition of Paris–Roubaix, a classic one-day cycling race in France. The single day event was held on 7 April 1957 and stretched 263 km (163 mi) from Paris to the finish at Roubaix Velodrome. The winner was Alfred De Bruyne from Belgium.

== Results ==
Final results (1–10)
Rank	Cyclist	Time
1	Alfred De Bruyne (BEL)	7h 15' 19″
2	Rik Van Steenbergen (BEL)	+1' 11″
3	Leon van Daele (BEL)	+1' 11″
4	André Darrigade (FRA)	+1' 11″
5	Maurice Mollin (BEL)	+1' 11″
6	Raymond Impanis (BEL)	+1' 11″
7	Serge Blusson (FRA)	+1' 11″
8	Norbert Kerckhove (BEL)	+1' 11″
9	Joseph Groussard (FRA)	+1' 11″
10	Jacques Dupont (FRA)	+1' 11″
