= Narrosse =

- Commune
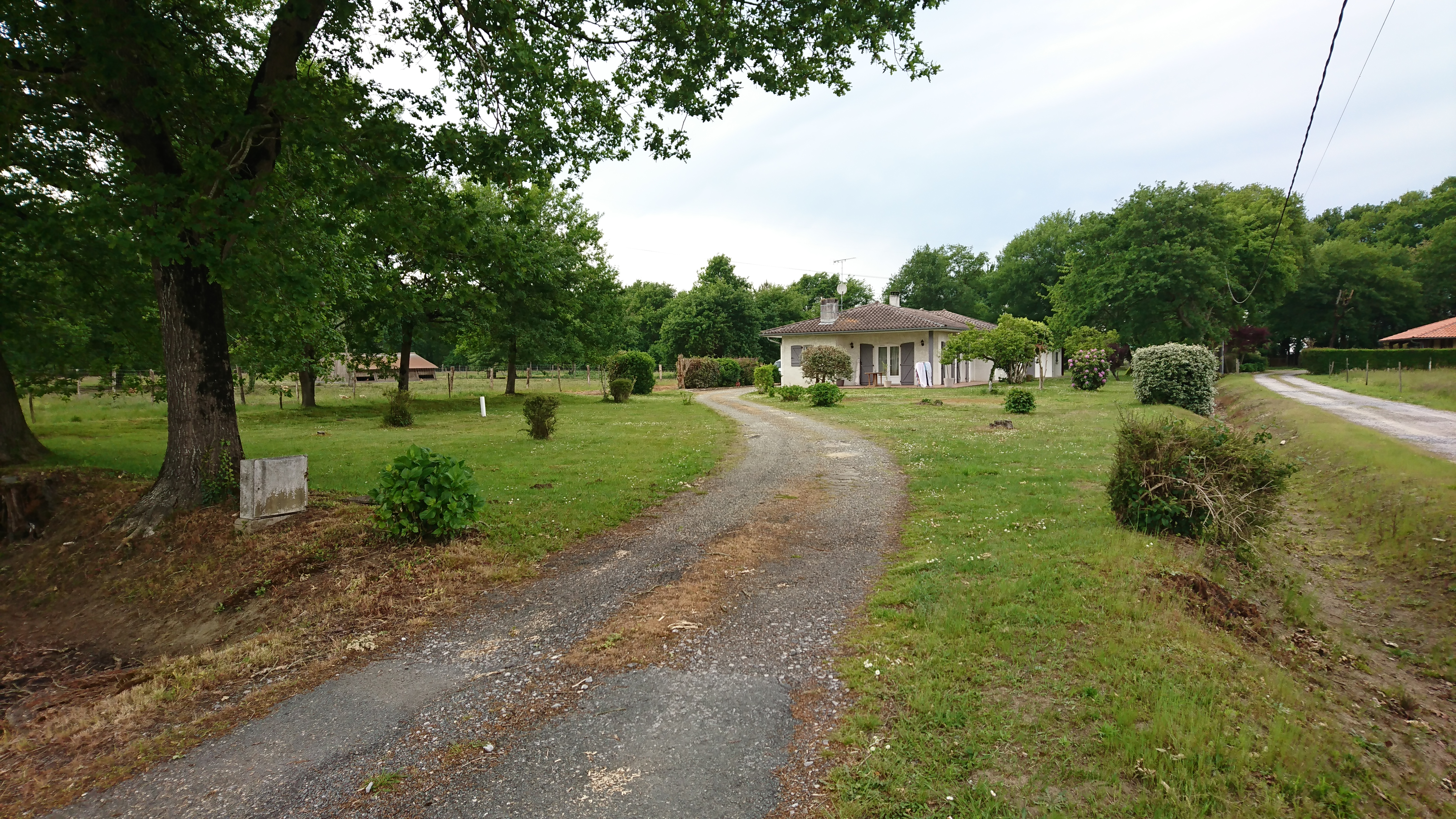
- Location of Narrosse
- Location within France Location within Nouvelle-Aquitaine
- Coordinates: 43°42′16″N 1°00′19″W
- Country: France
- Region: Nouvelle-Aquitaine
- Department: Landes
- Arrondissement: Dax
- Canton: Dax-2
- Intercommunality: CA Grand Dax

Government
  - Mayor (2025–2026): Bérengère Sabourault
- Area^{1}: 10.53 km^{2} (4.07 sq mi)
- Elevation: 30 m (98 ft)
- Highest elevation: 44 m (144 ft)
- Lowest elevation: 4 m (13 ft)
- Population (2023): 3,387
  - Density: 321.7/km^{2} (833.1/sq mi)
- Time zone: UTC+01:00 (CET)
  - Summer (DST): UTC+02:00 (CEST)
- INSEE/Postal code: 40202 /40180
- ^{1} French Land Register data, which excludes lakes, ponds, glaciers > 1 km^{2} (0.386 sq mi or 247 acres) and river estuaries.

Narrosse (French pronunciation: [naʁɔs]; Occitan: Narròssa) is a commune in the Landes department in Nouvelle-Aquitaine in southwestern France.

The road cycling world champion André Darrigade was born in Narrosse, and a statue of him on a bicycle decorates a roundabout in the village.

== Population ==
Historical population

Year	Pop.	±% p.a.
1793	517	—
1821	561	+0.29%
1846	670	+0.71%
1872	722	+0.29%
1901	743	+0.10%
1926	724	−0.10%
1946	780	+0.37%
1962	849	+0.53%
1968	932	+1.57%

Year	Pop.	±% p.a.
1975	1,220	+3.92%
1982	1,607	+4.01%
1990	2,204	+4.03%
1999	2,539	+1.58%
2007	2,801	+1.24%
2012	3,123	+2.20%
2017	3,210	+0.55%
2023	3,387	+0.90%

Source: EHESS and INSEE (1968–2023)

== See also ==
- Communes of the Landes department
