= Plebeina armata =

Scientific classification
- Kingdom: Animalia
- Phylum: Arthropoda
- Clade: Pancrustacea
- Class: Insecta
- Order: Hymenoptera
- Family: Apidae
- Genus: Plebeina; Moure, 1961
- Species: P. armata

Binomial name
- Plebeina armata (Magretti, 1895)

Synonyms
- Trigona armata Magretti, 1895; Trigona (Plebeina) hildebrandti (Friese, 1900); Melipona (Trigona) denoiti Vachal, 1903; Trigona denoiti katangensis Cockerell, 1934; Trigona clypeata Friese, 1909; Trigona zebra Strand, 1911

Species of bee

Plebeina armata, the mopane bee or mopane fly, is a very small gnat-like stingless bee species native to Africa, and the only member of its genus. It lives in savannah of Senegal, Nigeria, Cameroun, D.R. Congo (Shaba), Rwanda, Uganda, Kenya, Zimbabwe, Angola, Mozambique, Botswana, South Africa and Namibia.

It congregates about the moist tissue of the eyes, nose and mouth to find water in the dry environment where it lives, and is therefore sometimes called a "sweat bee". It is active only during the day and retreats at night. It also has the ability to produce a dark and strong honey.
