= 1961 La Flèche Wallonne =

Race details
- Dates: 16 May 1961
- Stages: 1
- Distance: 193 km (119.9 mi)
- Winning time: 4h 52' 43"

Results
	Winner	Willy Vannitsen (BEL)	(Baratti–Milano)
	Second	Jean Graczyk (FRA)	(Helyett–Fynsec–Hutchinson)
	Third	Frans Aerenhouts (BEL)	(Mercier–BP–Hutchinson)

The 1961 La Flèche Wallonne was the 25th edition of La Flèche Wallonne cycle race and was held on 16 May 1961. The race started in Liège and finished in Charleroi. The race was won by Willy Vannitsen of the Baratti team.

== General classification ==
Final general classification

Rank	Rider	Team	Time
1	Willy Vannitsen (BEL)	Baratti–Milano	4h 52' 43"
2	Jean Graczyk (FRA)	Helyett–Fynsec–Hutchinson	+ 0"
3	Frans Aerenhouts (BEL)	Mercier–BP–Hutchinson	+ 0"
4	Maurice Meuleman (BEL)	Wiel's–Flandria	+ 0"
5	Rolf Wolfshohl (FRG)	Rapha–Gitane–Dunlop	+ 0"
6	Jacques Anquetil (FRA)	Helyett–Fynsec–Hutchinson	+ 0"
7	Willy Vanden Berghen (BEL)	Mercier–BP–Hutchinson	+ 0"
8	Armand Desmet (BEL)	Faema	+ 0"
9	Hans Junkermann (FRG)	Torpedo	+ 0"
10	Francesco Miele (ITA)	Sauvage–Lejeune–Pelforth 43	+ 0"
