= 1959 UCI Road World Championships – Men's road race =

Men's Individual Road Race
1959 UCI Road World Championships
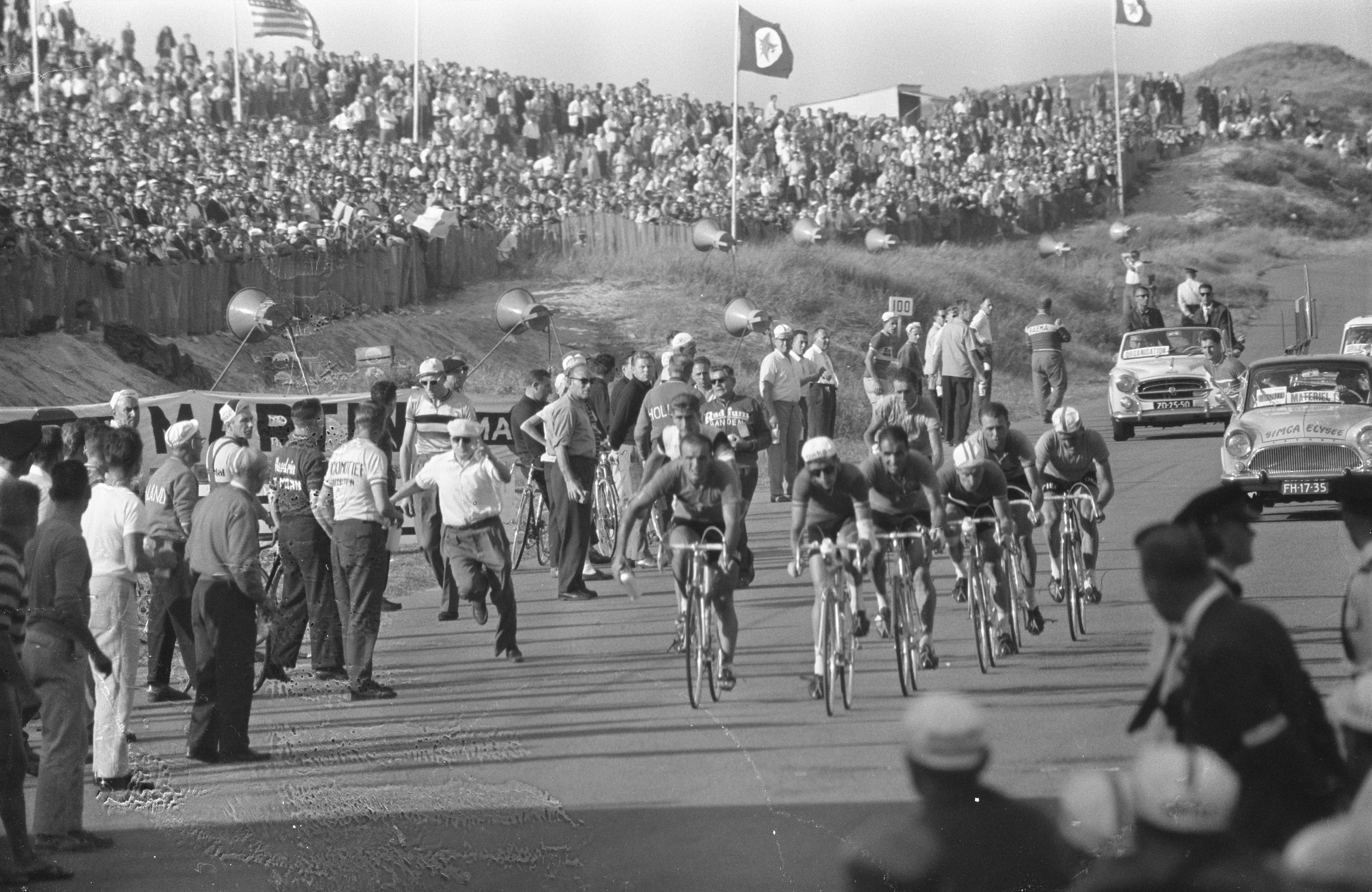
- Cyclists on the Circuit Park Zandvoort

Race details
- Dates: 14 August 1959
- Stages: 1
- Distance: 292 km (181.4 mi)
- Winning time: 7h 30' 43"

Results
	Winner	André Darrigade (FRA)	(France)
	Second	Michele Gismondi (ITA)	(Italy)
	Third	Noël Foré (BEL)	(Belgium)

The men's road race at the 1959 UCI Road World Championships was the 26th edition of the event. The race took place on Sunday 14 August 1959 in Zandvoort, the Netherlands. The race was won by André Darrigade of France.

== Final classification ==
General classification (1–10)

Rank	Rider	Time
1st place, gold medalist(s)	André Darrigade (FRA)	7h 30' 43"
2nd place, silver medalist(s)	Michele Gismondi (ITA)	+ 0"
3rd place, bronze medalist(s)	Noël Foré (BEL)	+ 0"
4	Tom Simpson (GBR)	+ 0"
5	Diego Ronchini (ITA)	+ 0"
6	Albertus Geldermans (NED)	+ 0"
7	Friedhelm Fischerkeller (FRG)	+ 0"
8	Coen Niesten (NED)	+ 0"
9	Jacques Anquetil (FRA)	+ 22"
10	Angelo Conterno (ITA)	+ 22"
