= Walter Martin (Italian cyclist) =

Italian cyclist

Personal information
- Born: 26 September 1936 Ostia, Italy
- Died: 21 January 2020 (aged 83) Turin, Italy

Cycling career
- Sport: Cycling
- Discipline: Road
- Role: Rider

Professional teams
- 1958: San Pellegrino
- 1959–1962: Carpano
- 1963: IBAC
- 1964: Carpano

Walter Martin (26 September 1936 – 21 January 2020) was an Italian professional racing cyclist. He notably won the 1961 Milano–Torino and rode in five editions of the Giro d'Italia.

== Major results ==
1958
10th Giro di Romagna
1959
3rd Giro dell'Emilia
10th Giro di Lombardia
1960
1st Stage 3 Tour de Suisse
1961
1st Milano–Torino
3rd Giro di Romagna
5th Giro di Toscana
7th Milan–San Remo
9th Overall Roma–Napoli–Roma
1962
2nd Giro dell'Emilia
5th GP Alghero
1963
2nd Giro del Lazio
2nd GP Cemab
3rd Road race, National Road Championships
5th Giro dell'Emilia
7th Giro di Romagna

=== Grand Tour general classification results timeline ===
Grand Tour	1958	1959	1960	1961	1962	1963	1964
Vuelta a España	—	—	—	—	—	—	—
Giro d'Italia	40	74	—	DNF	DNF	—	86
Tour de France	—	—	—	—	—	—	—
