= 1962 Liège–Bastogne–Liège =

Race details
- Dates: 6 May 1962
- Stages: 1
- Distance: 254 km (158 mi)
- Winning time: 6h 55' 56"

Results
| | Winner | Jef Planckaert (BEL) | (Flandria–Faema–Clément) |
| | Second | Rolf Wolfshohl (FRG) | (Gitane–Leroux–Dunlop–R. Geminiani) |
| | Third | Claude Colette (FRA) | (Peugeot–BP–Dunlop) |

The 1962 Liège–Bastogne–Liège was the 48th edition of the Liège–Bastogne–Liège cycle race and was held on 6 May 1962. The race started and finished in Liège. The race was won by Jef Planckaert of the Flandria team.

== General classification ==
Final general classification

| Rank | Rider | Team | Time |
|---|---|---|---|
| 1 | Jef Planckaert (BEL) | Flandria–Faema–Clément | 6h 55' 56" |
| 2 | Rolf Wolfshohl (FRG) | Gitane–Leroux–Dunlop–R. Geminiani | + 0" |
| 3 | Claude Colette (FRA) | Peugeot–BP–Dunlop | + 20" |
| 4 | Joseph Wouters (BEL) | Solo–Van Steenbergen | + 56" |
| 5 | André Darrigade (FRA) | Gitane–Leroux–Dunlop–R. Geminiani | + 56" |
| 6 | Noël Foré (BEL) | Flandria–Faema–Clément | + 56" |
| 7 | Willy Vanden Berghen (BEL) | Mercier–BP–Hutchinson | + 56" |
| 8 | Rik Van Looy (BEL) | Flandria–Faema–Clément | + 56" |
| 9 | Frans Schoubben (BEL) | Peugeot–BP–Dunlop | + 56" |
| 10 | Norbert Kerckhove (BEL) | Dr. Mann–Labo | + 56" |
