= 1957 Tour of Flanders =

41st Tour of Flanders
Race details
- Dates: 31 March 1957
- Stages: 1
- Distance: 242 km (150.4 mi)
- Winning time: 5h 58'

Results
	Winner	Fred De Bruyne (BEL)	(Carpano–Coppi)
	Second	Jozef Planckaert (BEL)	(Peugeot–BP)
	Third	Norbert Kerckhove (BEL)	(Faema–Guerra)

The 41st running of the Tour of Flanders cycling classic was held on Sunday, 31 March 1957. Belgian rider Fred De Bruyne won the race in the sprint of a ten-man group in Wetteren. 85 of the 174 riders finished.

== Route ==
The race started in Ghent and finished in Wetteren – covering 242 km. The course featured four categorized climbs:

- Kwaremont
- Statieberg
- Berg Ten Stene
- Kloosterstraat (Geraardsbergen)

== Results ==
Result
Rank	Rider	Team	Time
1	Fred De Bruyne (BEL)	Carpano–Coppi	5h 58' 00"
2	Jef Planckaert (BEL)	Peugeot–BP	s.t.
3	Norbert Kerckhove (BEL)	Bertin	s.t.
4	Nicolas Barone (FRA)	Saint Raphael–Geminiani–Quinquina	s.t.
5	Yvo Molenaers (BEL)	Plume Sport	s.t.
6	Gastone Nencini (ITA)	Leo–Chlorodont	s.t.
7	Seamus Elliot (IRL)	Helyett–Potin	s.t.
8	Frans Schoubben (BEL)	Peugeot–BP	s.t.
9	Agostino Coletto (ITA)	Carpano–Coppi	s.t.
10	Désiré Keteleer (BEL)	Carpano–Coppi	s.t.
