= 1956 Paris–Nice =

Race details
- Dates: 13–17 March 1956
- Stages: 5
- Distance: 1,104 km (686.0 mi)
- Winning time: 30h 23' 23"

Results
Jersey awarded to the overall winner	Winner	Fred De Bruyne (BEL)
	Second	Pierre Barbotin (FRA)
	Third	François Mahé (FRA)

The 1956 Paris–Nice was the 14th edition of the Paris–Nice cycle race and was held from 13 March to 17 March 1956. The race started in Créteil and finished in Nice. The race was won by Fred De Bruyne.

== General classification ==
Final general classification

Rank	Rider	Time
1	Fred De Bruyne (BEL)	30h 23' 23"
2	Pierre Barbotin (FRA)	+ 3' 58"
3	François Mahé (FRA)	+ 4' 36"
4	Georges Meunier (FRA)	+ 6' 47"
5	Camille Huyghe (FRA)	+ 6' 58"
6	Jozef Verhelst (BEL)	+ 7' 08"
7	Gianni Ferlenghi (ITA)	+ 7' 52"
8	Jean Dotto (FRA)	+ 7' 55"
9	René Privat (FRA)	+ 8' 24"
10	Jean Forestier (FRA)	+ 8' 30"
