= 1954 Milan–San Remo =

Race details
- Dates: 19 March 1954
- Stages: 1
- Distance: 282 km (175 mi)
- Winning time: 7h 10' 03"

Results
	Winner	Rik Van Steenbergen (BEL)
	Second	Francis Anastasi (FRA)
	Third	Giuseppe Favero (ITA)

The 1954 Milan–San Remo was the 45th edition of the Milan–San Remo cycle race and was held on 19 March 1954. The race started in Milan and finished in San Remo. The race was won by Rik Van Steenbergen.

== General classification ==
Final general classification

Rank	Rider	Time
1	Rik Van Steenbergen (BEL)	7h 10' 03"
2	Francis Anastasi (FRA)	+ 0"
3	Giuseppe Favero (ITA)	+ 0"
4	Fausto Coppi (ITA)	+ 0"
5	Loretto Petrucci (ITA)	+ 0"
6	Stan Ockers (BEL)	+ 0"
7	Désiré Keteleer (BEL)	+ 0"
8	Fiorenzo Magni (ITA)	+ 0"
9	Ettore Milano (ITA)	+ 0"
10	Guido Messina (ITA)	+ 0"
