= 1963 Brabantse Pijl =

Race details
- Dates: 3 April 1963
- Stages: 1
- Distance: 185 km (115.0 mi)
- Winning time: 4h 42' 00"

Results
	Winner	Jos Wouters (BEL)
	Second	Emile Daems (BEL)
	Third	Gustaaf De Smet (BEL)

The 1963 Brabantse Pijl was the third edition of the Brabantse Pijl cycle race and was held on 3 April 1963. The race started and finished in Brussels. The race was won by Jos Wouters.

== General classification ==
Final general classification

Rank	Rider	Time
1	Jos Wouters (BEL)	4h 42' 00"
2	Emile Daems (BEL)	+ 1"
3	Gustaaf De Smet (BEL)	+ 2"
4	Michel Van Aerde (BEL)	+ 2"
5	Benoni Beheyt (BEL)	+ 2"
6	Robert Seneca (BEL)	+ 2"
7	Jan Janssen (NED)	+ 2"
8	Lode Troonbeeckx (BEL)	+ 2"
9	Jos Dewit (BEL)	+ 2"
10	Willy Raes (BEL)	+ 2"
