= 1957 Paris–Tours =

Race details
- Dates: 6 October 1957
- Stages: 1
- Distance: 251 km (156.0 mi)
- Winning time: 5h 51' 31"

Results
	Winner	Fred De Bruyne (BEL)
	Second	Louison Bobet (FRA)
	Third	Angelo Conterno (ITA)

The 1957 Paris–Tours was the 51st edition of the Paris–Tours cycle race and was held on 6 October 1957. The race started in Paris and finished in Tours. The race was won by Fred De Bruyne.

== General classification ==
Final general classification

Rank	Rider	Time
1	Fred De Bruyne (BEL)	5h 51' 31"
2	Louison Bobet (FRA)	+ 0"
3	Angelo Conterno (ITA)	+ 0"
4	Albert Dolhats (FRA)	+ 0"
5	Roger Baudechon (BEL)	+ 0"
6	Rik Van Looy (BEL)	+ 0"
7	Miguel Poblet (ESP)	+ 0"
8	Arthur Decabooter (BEL)	+ 0"
9	René Fournier (FRA)	+ 0"
10	Jacques Anquetil (FRA)	+ 0"
