= 1958 Giro di Lombardia =

Race details
- Dates: October 19, 1958
- Stages: 1
- Distance: 243 km (151.0 mi)

Results
| | Winner | Nino Defilippis (ITA) |
| | Second | Miguel Poblet (ESP) |
| | Third | Michel Van Aerde (BEL) |

The 1958 Giro di Lombardia, the 52nd edition of the race, was held on October 19, 1958.

== General classification ==
=== Final general classification ===
| Rank | Rider | Team | Time |
|---|---|---|---|
| 1 | Nino Defilippis (ITA) | Carpano | |
| 2 | Miguel Poblet (ESP) | Ignis | |
| 3 | Michel Van Aerde (BEL) | Carpano | |
| 4 | Jozef Schils (BEL) | Faema-Guerra | |
| 5 | Giuseppe Calvi (ITA) | Ghigi | |
| 6 | Pino Cerami (BEL) | Peugeot | |
| 7 | Tranquillo Scudellaro (ITA) | Torpado | |
| 8 | Ercole Baldini (ITA) | Legnano | |
| 9 | Armando Pellegrini (ITA) | Faema-Guerra | |
| 10 | Angelo Conterno (ITA) | Carpano | |
