= Grand Prix Stan Ockers =

Road bicycle race in eastern France (1957–1963)

Race details
- Date: May
- Region: Valentigney, France
- Discipline: Road
- Competition: Super Prestige Pernod
- Type: Single-day race

History
- First edition: 1957
- Editions: 6
- Final edition: 1963
- First winner: Raymond Impanis (BEL)
- Final winner: Willy Bocklant (BEL)

The Grand Prix Stan Ockers was a professional cycle race held as a single-day race around Valentigney, France, held in memoriam of Stan Ockers. It was first held in 1957 and held for the final time in 1963. From 1959 to 1963 it was part of the Super Prestige Pernod series.

== Winners ==
| Year | Country | Rider | Team |
|---|---|---|---|
| 1957 | Belgium | Raymond Impanis | Peugeot–BP–Dunlop |
| 1958 | Belgium | André Vlayen | |
| 1959 | France | René Privat | Mercier–BP–Hutchinson |
| 1960 | Ireland | Seamus Elliott | Helyett–Leroux–Fynsec–Hutchinson |
| 1961 | No race | | |
| 1962 | France | Joseph Velly | Margnat–Paloma–D'Alessandro |
| 1963 | Belgium | Willy Bocklant | Flandria–Faema |
