= Carpano =

Carpano is a surname. Notable people with the name include:

- Antonio Benedetto Carpano, (1764–1815), Italian distiller
- Cesare Carpano (died 1528), Roman Catholic prelate, Bishop of Muro Lucano

== See also ==
- Carpano (cycling team)
