= 1956 Milan–San Remo =

Race details
- Dates: 19 March 1956
- Stages: 1
- Distance: 281 km (175 mi)
- Winning time: 6h 57' 10"

Results
	Winner	Fred De Bruyne (BEL)
	Second	Fiorenzo Magni (ITA)
	Third	Jef Planckaert (BEL)

The 1956 Milan–San Remo was the 47th edition of the Milan–San Remo cycle race and was held on 19 March 1956. The race started in Milan and finished in San Remo. The race was won by Fred De Bruyne.

== General classification ==
Final general classification

Rank	Rider	Time
1	Fred De Bruyne (BEL)	6h 57' 10"
2	Fiorenzo Magni (ITA)	+ 46"
3	Jef Planckaert (BEL)	+ 50"
4	Willy Vannitsen (BEL)	+ 1' 51"
5	Donato Piazza (ITA)	+ 1' 51"
6	Mario Baroni (ITA)	+ 1' 51"
7	Germain Derycke (BEL)	+ 1' 51"
8	Arigo Padovan (ITA)	+ 1' 51"
9	Giorgio Albani (ITA)	+ 1' 51"
10	Stan Ockers (BEL)	+ 1' 51"
