= 1959 UCI Road World Championships =

- Location within Netherlands
- Venue: Zandvoort, Netherlands
- Date: 16 August 1959
- Coordinates: 52°22′N 4°32′E

The 1959 UCI Road World Championships was the 32nd edition of the UCI Road World Championships.

It took place on Sunday 16 August 1959 in Zandvoort, Netherlands.

However, the women's competition did not take place in Zandvoort, but in Rotheux-Rimière, Belgium, south of Liège. The race was held two weeks before the men's race, on a four-kilometer lap that was completed 18 times. Belgian Yvonne Reynders won the second edition of the women's race over 72 kilometers in one hour and 53 minutes.

German Gustav-Adolf Schur succeeded himself as amateur world champion.

Frenchman André Darrigade became the winner of the professional road race after cycling more than 292 kilometers.

In the same period, the 1959 UCI Track Cycling World Championships were organized in the Olympic Stadium of Amsterdam, Netherlands.

== Results ==
Race:	Gold:	Time	Silver:	Time	Bronze:	Time
Men
Men's road race	André Darrigade; France	7 h 30 min 43s	Michele Gismondi; Italy	m.t.	Noel Fore; Belgium	m.t.
Amateurs' road race	Gustav-Adolf Schur; East Germany	-	Bastiaan Maliepaard; Netherlands	-	Constant Goossens; Belgium	-
Women
Women's road race	Yvonne Reynders; Belgium	-	Aino Puronen; Soviet Union	-	Vera Gorbatcheva; Soviet Union	-

== Medal table ==
Rank	Nation	Gold	Silver	Bronze	Total
1	Belgium (BEL)	1	0	2	3
2	East Germany (GDR)	1	0	0	1
2	France (FRA)	1	0	0	1
4	Soviet Union (URS)	0	1	1	2
5	Italy (ITA)	0	1	0	1
5	Netherlands (NED)	0	1	0	1
Totals (6 entries)		3	3	3	9
