= Joseph Wouters =

Belgian cyclist

Personal information
- Born: 21 February 1942 (age 84) Keerbergen, Belgium

Cycling career
- Sport: Cycling
- Current team: Retired
- Discipline: Road
- Role: Rider

Professional teams
- 1961–1964: Solo–Van Steenbergen
- 1964–1965: Libertas

Major wins
- One-day races and Classics Paris–Tours (1961) Brabantse Pijl (1963) Paris–Brussels (1962)

Joseph Wouters, also known as Jos, (born 21 February 1942 in Keerbergen) is a Belgian former road cyclist. Professional from 1961 to 1965, he won the classics Paris–Tours, Paris–Brussels and the Brabantse Pijl.

== Major results ==
1961
1st Paris–Tours
1st Ronde van Brabant
1962
1st Paris–Brussels
1st Ronde van Brabant
1st Stage 7 Vuelta a Levante
2nd Ronde van Limburg
4th Liège–Bastogne–Liège
6th Paris–Roubaix
10th Tour of Flanders
1963
1st Ronde van Limburg
1st Brabantse Pijl
1st Stages 2 & 4 Tour of Belgium
1st Stage 3 Paris–Nice
4th Paris–Brussels
5th Tour of Flanders
9th Gent–Wevelgem
1964
8th Gent–Wevelgem
