= Omloop van de Fruitstreek =

Recurring sporting event

Race details
- Date: March, April
- Region: Flanders, Belgium
- English name: Circuit of the fruit region
- Local name(s): Omloop van de Fruitstreek (Dutch), Circuit des régions fruitières (French)
- Discipline: Road
- Type: One-day

History
- First edition: 1955
- Editions: 22
- Final edition: 1976
- First winner: Jean Storms (BEL)
- Most wins: Willy Vannitsen (BEL) (3 wins)
- Final winner: Emiel Gijsemans (BEL)

The Circuit of the Fruit Region was a men's cycling race organized for the last time in 1976. The start and finish place was Alken (Limburg, Belgium), except in 1968 when the event was organized in Hasselt.

The competition's roll of honor includes the successes of Rik Van Looy and Walter Godefroot.

== Winners ==
Year	Winner	Second	Third
1955	(Belgium) Jean Storms	(Belgium) Joseph Marien	(Belgium) Frans Gielen
1956	(Belgium) Willy Vannitsen	(Belgium) Rik Van Looy	(Belgium) Jozef De Feyter
1957	(Belgium) Willy Vannitsen	(Belgium) Joseph Verachtert	(Belgium) Léopold Schaeken
1958	(Belgium) Léon Van Daele	(Belgium) Roger Molenaers	(Belgium) Frans Schoubben
1959	(Belgium) Petrus Oellibrandt	(Belgium) Marcel Janssens	(Netherlands) Jaap Kersten
1960	(Belgium) Martin Van Geneugden	(Belgium) René Van Meenen	(Netherlands) Piet Damen
1961	(Belgium) Martin Van Geneugden	(Netherlands) Joop Captein	(Belgium) Joseph Verachtert
1962	(Belgium) Roger De Coninck	(Belgium) Jean-Baptiste Claes	(Belgium) Théo Nys
1963	(Belgium) Willy Vannitsen	(Netherlands) Jo de Haan	(Netherlands) Joop Captein
1964	(Belgium) Joseph Verachtert	(Belgium) André Noyelle	(Belgium) Jan Lauwers
1965	(Belgium) Roger De Coninck	(Belgium) Guillaume Van Tongerloo	(Netherlands) Jo de Haan
1966	(Belgium) Rik Van Looy	(Belgium) Walter Ramon	(Netherlands) Henk Cornelisse
1967	(Belgium) Rik Van Looy	(Belgium) Roger Verheyden	(Netherlands) Harm Ottenbros
1968	(Netherlands) Harry Steevens	(Belgium) Julien Stevens	(Netherlands) Leo Duyndam
1969	(Belgium) Walter Godefroot	(Belgium) Julien Stevens	(Netherlands) Harm Ottenbros
1970	(Belgium) Frans Verbeeck	(Belgium) Alfons Scheys	(Belgium) Edward Sels
1971	(Belgium) Albert Van Vlierberghe	(Belgium) Fernand Hermie	(United Kingdom) Peter Head
1972	(Belgium) Gustaaf Van Roosbroeck	(Belgium) Jozef Abelshausen	(Belgium) Ludo Vanderlinden
1973	(Belgium) Marcel Omloop	(Netherlands) Jan Serpenti	(Belgium) Léopold Vanden Neste
1974	(Belgium) Jozef Abelshausen	(Belgium) Daniel Pauwels	(Belgium) Antoon Houbrechts
1975	(Belgium) Geert Malfait	(Belgium) Roger Loysch	(Belgium) Herman Vrijders
1976	(Belgium) Emiel Gijsemans	(Belgium) Daniel Verplancke	(Netherlands) Bas Hordijk
