= 1958 Paris–Nice =

Race details
- Dates: 10–16 March 1958
- Stages: 7
- Distance: 1,359 km (844.4 mi)
- Winning time: 34h 22' 08"

Results
Jersey awarded to the overall winner	Winner	Fred De Bruyne (BEL)	(Carpano)
	Second	Pasquale Fornara (ITA)	(Ignis–Doniselli)
	Third	Germain Derycke (BEL)	(Carpano)

The 1958 Paris–Nice was the 16th edition of the Paris–Nice cycle race and was held from 10 March to 16 March 1958. The race started in Paris and finished in Nice. The race was won by Fred De Bruyne of the Carpano team.

== General classification ==
Final general classification

Rank	Rider	Team	Time
1	Fred De Bruyne (BEL)	Carpano	34h 22' 08"
2	Pasquale Fornara (ITA)	Ignis–Doniselli	+ 52"
3	Germain Derycke (BEL)	Carpano	+ 2' 38"
4	Raphaël Géminiani (FRA)	Saint-Raphaël–R. Geminiani–Dunlop	+ 3' 33"
5	Fernando Brandolini (ITA)	Bianchi–Pirelli	+ 4' 50"
6	Jean Forestier (FRA)	Helyett–Leroux–Hutchinson	+ 5' 04"
7	Gianni Ferlenghi (ITA)	Bianchi–Pirelli	+ 5' 10"
8	Renzo Accordi (ITA)	Ignis–Doniselli	+ 5' 41"
9	Seamus Elliott (IRL)	Helyett–Leroux–Hutchinson	+ 8' 08"
10	Jacques Anquetil (FRA)	Helyett–Leroux–Hutchinson	+ 8' 35"
