= Mopani =

Mopani can be:

- Colophospermum mopane, a tree species found in South Africa, Zimbabwe, Mozambique, Botswana, Zambia, Namibia, Angola and Malawi
- Gonimbrasia belina, an emperor moth caterpillar that lives in the mopani (mopane) tree
- Mopani District Municipality, South Africa
- Mopani Copper Mine, a copper mining company
