= Paolo Magretti =

Italian cyclist and biologist (1854–1913)

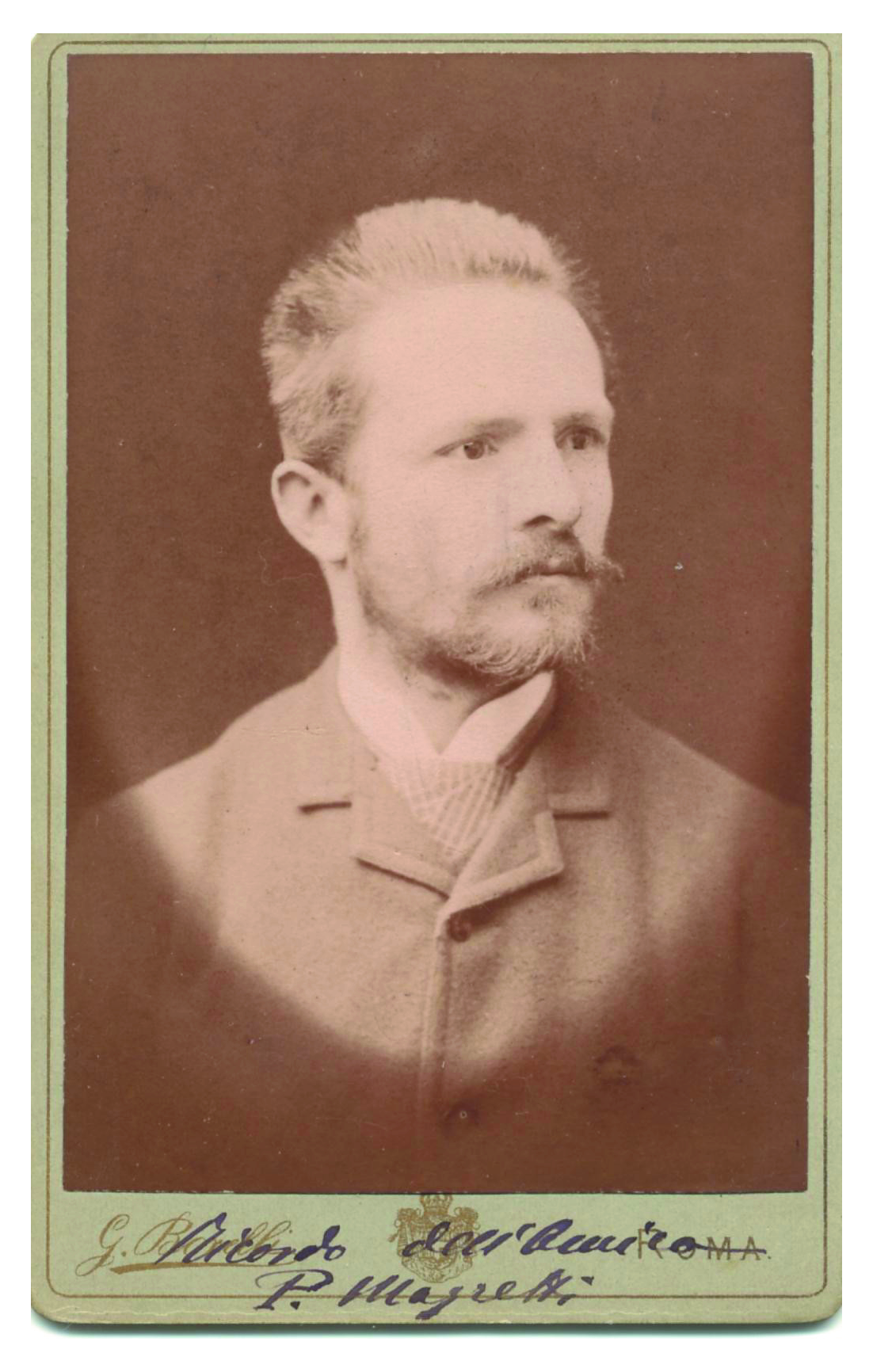
Paolo Magretti Portrait

Paolo Magretti (15 December 1854, Milan, Austrian Empire – 30 August 1913, Paderno Dugnano) was an Italian entomologist who specialized in Hymenoptera studies.

He studied zoology under Leopoldo Maggi and Pietro Pavesi at the University of Pavia, graduating in 1880 with a thesis on Hymenoptera found in Lombardy. In 1883 he undertook a zoological expedition to eastern Sudan and Eritrea, in which he collected a number of Hymenoptera species new to science. In 1900, he returned to Eritrea, where he spent two months collecting more zoological specimens.

He donated his African collections to the zoological museums in Genoa and Milan. In addition to his work with African species, he conducted research of Hymenoptera native to Burma. During the last years of his life, he worked as a curator at the Natural History Museum of Milan. Magretti was the author of 28 publications on Hymenoptera.

Besides his endeavours in entomology, Magretti was also a cyclist, winning the first edition of the Milano–Torino race in 1876.

== Published works ==
- Sugli imenotteri della Lombardia, 1881 - On Hymenoptera of Lombardy.
- Risultati di raccolte imenotterologiche nell'Africa Orientale, 1884 - Results in regards to Hymenoptera collected in East Africa.
- Nel Sudàn orientale : ricordi d'un viaggio in Africa per studii zoologici, 1884 - On eastern Sudan; reports on a journey in Africa for zoological study.
- Viaggio di L. Fea in Birmania e regioni vicine ... Imenotteri, 1892 - Travels by Leonardo Fea in Burma and neighboring regions ... Hymenoptera.
- Imenotteri. Parte prima. Mutillidei, Scoliidei, Tifiidei, Tinnidei; colla descrizione di parecchie nuove specie (with Leonardo Fea), 1892 - Hymenoptera, Part 1, Mutillidae, Scoliidae, Tiphiidae, Tinnidae; with descriptions of several new species.
- Materiali per la conoscenza della Fauna eritrea, 1905 - treatise on Eritrean fauna.

== Cycling Palmares ==
1873
2nd Milano - Monza
1876
1st Milano–Torino
1st Milano - Lecco
1st Milano - Vercelli (fastest time)
