= Super Prestige Pernod =

Cycling competition

- Formerly: Challenge Desgrange-Colombo
- Sport: Road bicycle racing
- First season: 1959
- Folded: 1987
- Replaced by: UCI Road World Cup
- Countries: International
- Last champion: Stephen Roche (IRE)
- Most titles: Eddy Merckx (BEL) (7)

The Super Prestige Pernod was a season-long competition in road bicycle racing between 1958 and 1987. For the first edition it was known as the Prestige Pernod, and for the last four years as the Super Prestige Pernod International.

== History ==
Disagreements between the organisers of the similar Challenge Desgrange-Colombo led to its demise and a gap in season-long competitions. In 1958, the publicity division of Pernod offered a trophy for the best French rider of the year. The competition was known as the Prestige Pernod. It was a rival to Challenge Yellow, run by the chain company Sedis since 1931.

The following year, Pernod added the Super Prestige Pernod, for the best rider of the year, assessed on points attributed to the biggest races. At the same time it introduced Promotion Pernod, for the best French rider under 25. The Super Prestige Pernod became an unofficial world points championship.

A fourth class, Promotion Internationale, appeared in 1983 but that and the Promotion Pernod vanished the following year to create a single Super Prestige Pernod. A women's competition was added in 1985. Both were abandoned at the end of 1987 when France banned drinks advertising in sport.

The Super Prestige Pernod was won by some of the greatest names in professional cycle racing. They included Jacques Anquetil, who won four times, Eddy Merckx won a record seven times (1969–1975); Bernard Hinault equalled Anquetil's total with his fourth consecutive victory in 1982; while the final four years were won by Irish riders Sean Kelly (1984–1986) and Stephen Roche (1987). Anquetil was the only rider to regain the title having lost it, a feat he achieved twice.

== Races ==
Race	Location	Type	Years	Editions within SPP
Amstel Gold Race	Netherlands	Single day race	1976–1987	10
Bordeaux–Paris	France	Single day race	1959–1970, 1973–1987	27
Circuit du Provençal	France	Stage race	1965	1
Clásica de San Sebastián	Spain	Single day race	1987	1
Clásico RCN	Colombia	Stage race	1986–1987	2
Coors Classic	United States	Stage race	1986–1987	2
Critérium du Dauphiné Libéré	France	Stage race	1959–1966, 1969–1974, 1976–1987	26
Four Days of Dunkirk	France	Stage race	1961–1962, 1967–1987	23
Genoa–Nice	Italy/France	Single day race	1961–1962	2
Gent–Wevelgem	Belgium	Single day race	1979–1987	9
Giro d'Italia	Italy	Stage race	1961–1987	27
Giro di Campania	Italy	Single day race	1962	1
Giro di Lombardia	Italy	Single day race	1960–1987	28
Grand Prix de Fourmies	France	Single day race	1979	1
Grand Prix des Nations	France	Individual time trial	1959–1987	29
Grand Prix du Midi Libre	France	Stage race	1961, 1966–1967, 1969–1974, 1976–1987	21
Grand Prix du Parisien	France	Team time trial	1963–1965	3
Grand Prix Stan Ockers	France	Single day race	1959–1960, 1962–1963	4
La Flèche Wallonne	Belgium	Single day race	1961–1970, 1972, 1974, 1976–1987	24
Liège–Bastogne–Liège	Belgium	Single day race	1960, 1965–1969, 1971, 1973, 1975–1987	21
Milan–San Remo	Italy	Single day race	1960–1987	28
Milano–Torino	Italy	Single day race	1979	1
Omloop Het Volk	Belgium	Single-day race	1983–1987	5
Paris–Brussels	France/Belgium	Single day race	1959–1966, 1975–1978, 1981–1984, 1986–1987	18
Paris–Luxembourg	France/Luxembourg	Stage race	1964–1970	7
Paris–Nice	France	Stage race	1960, 1963–1987	26
Paris–Roubaix	France	Single day race	1959–1987	29
Paris–Tours	France	Single day race	1959–1987	29
Rund um den Henninger Turm	Germany	Single day race	1968–1974, 1977–1987	18
Setmana Catalana de Ciclisme	Spain	Stage race	1972–1974, 1976, 1978	5
Tirreno–Adriatico	Italy	Stage race	1980–1987	8
Tour de France	France	Stage race	1959–1987	29
Tour de l'Avenir	France	Stage race	1982–1987	6
Tour de l'Ouest	France	Stage race	1959	1
Tour de la Nouvelle-France	Canada	Stage race	1972–1973	2
Tour de Romandie	Switzerland	Stage race	1961–1962, 1974–1987	16
Tour de Suisse	Switzerland	Stage race	1974–1975, 1977–1987	13
Tour of Flanders	Belgium	Single day race	1960–1987	28
Tour of Ireland	Ireland	Stage race	1987	1
Tre Valli Varesine	Italy	Single day race	1961	1
UCI Road World Championships – Men's road race	Varied	Single day race	1959–1987	29
Volta a Catalunya	Spain	Stage race	1975, 1977, 1985–1987	5
Vuelta a Colombia	Colombia	Stage race	1986–1987	2
Vuelta a España	Spain	Stage race	1961–1987	27
Züri-Metzgete	Switzerland	Single day race	1975, 1979–1982, 1984–1987	9

== Winners ==
Year	Winner	Second	Third	Fourth	Fifth
1959	Henry Anglade (France)	Roger Rivière	Noël Foré	Rik Van Looy	Gérard Saint
1960	Jean Graczyk (France)	Pino Cerami	Gastone Nencini	Raymond Mastrotto	Rik Van Looy
1961	Jacques Anquetil (France)	Raymond Poulidor	Rik Van Looy	Gilbert Desmet I	Nino Defilippis
1962	Jo de Roo (Netherlands)	Jef Planckaert	Emile Daems	Rik Van Looy	Jacques Anquetil
1963	Jacques Anquetil (France)	Tom Simpson	Raymond Poulidor	Jo de Roo	Rik Van Looy
1964	Raymond Poulidor (France)	Jan Janssen	Jacques Anquetil	Rik Van Looy	Benoni Beheyt
1965	Jacques Anquetil (France)	Tom Simpson	Ward Sels	Raymond Poulidor	Felice Gimondi
1966	Jacques Anquetil (France)	Felice Gimondi	Raymond Poulidor	Jan Janssen	Lucien Aimar
1967	Jan Janssen (Netherlands)	Eddy Merckx	Felice Gimondi	Roger Pingeon	Franco Balmamion
1968	Herman Van Springel (Belgium)	Felice Gimondi	Jan Janssen	Eddy Merckx	Walter Godefroot
1969	Eddy Merckx (Belgium)	Felice Gimondi	Herman Van Springel	Raymond Poulidor	Walter Godefroot
1970	Eddy Merckx (Belgium)	Herman Van Springel	Luis Ocaña	Eric Leman	Felice Gimondi
1971	Eddy Merckx (Belgium)	Luis Ocaña	Gösta Pettersson	Joop Zoetemelk	Cyrille Guimard
1972	Eddy Merckx (Belgium)	Raymond Poulidor	Cyrille Guimard	Yves Hézard	Joop Zoetemelk
1973	Eddy Merckx (Belgium)	Luis Ocaña	Felice Gimondi	Joop Zoetemelk	Freddy Maertens
1974	Eddy Merckx (Belgium)	Roger De Vlaeminck	Frans Verbeeck	Raymond Poulidor	Joop Zoetemelk
1975	Eddy Merckx (Belgium)	Roger De Vlaeminck	Francesco Moser	Bernard Thévenet	Freddy Maertens
1976	Freddy Maertens (Belgium)	Francesco Moser	Joop Zoetemelk	Eddy Merckx	Lucien Van Impe
1977	Freddy Maertens (Belgium)	Roger De Vlaeminck	Bernard Hinault	Joop Zoetemelk	Francesco Moser
1978	Francesco Moser (Italy)	Bernard Hinault	Joop Zoetemelk	Gerrie Knetemann	Jan Raas
1979	Bernard Hinault (France)	Giuseppe Saronni	Joop Zoetemelk	Francesco Moser	Jan Raas
1980	Bernard Hinault (France)	Fons De Wolf	Francesco Moser	Hennie Kuiper	Giuseppe Saronni
1981	Bernard Hinault (France)	Roger De Vlaeminck	Jan Raas	Fons De Wolf	Hennie Kuiper
1982	Bernard Hinault (France)	Giuseppe Saronni	Silvano Contini	Tommy Prim	Sean Kelly
1983	Greg LeMond (United States)	Sean Kelly	Jan Raas	Giuseppe Saronni	Adri van der Poel
1984	Sean Kelly (Republic of Ireland)	Bernard Hinault	Phil Anderson	Laurent Fignon	Francesco Moser
1985	Sean Kelly (Republic of Ireland)	Phil Anderson	Greg LeMond	Bernard Hinault	Moreno Argentin
1986	Sean Kelly (Republic of Ireland)	Greg LeMond	Claude Criquielion	Adri van der Poel	Urs Zimmermann
1987	Stephen Roche (Republic of Ireland)	Sean Kelly	Claude Criquielion	Charly Mottet	Eric Vanderaerden

== See also ==
- List of road bicycle racing events
