= Milano–Torino =

Italian one-day road cycling race

Race details
- Date: March (has sometimes been October)
- Region: North of Italy
- English name: Milan–Turin
- Local name: Milano–Torino (in Italian)
- Discipline: Road
- Competition: UCI ProSeries
- Type: One-day
- Organiser: RCS Sport
- Web site: www.milanotorino.it

History
- First edition: 1876
- Editions: 107 (as of 2026)
- First winner: Paolo Magretti (ITA)
- Most wins: Costante Girardengo (ITA) (5 wins)
- Most recent: Tom Pidcock (GBR)

Milano–Torino is a semi classic European single day cycling race, between the northern Italian cities of Milan and Turin over a distance of 199 kilometres. The event was first run in 1876 making it the oldest classic race in the world. The event is owned by the RCS media group which owns the Italian sports daily La Gazzetta dello Sport. RCS also organises other top Italian cycling events such as the Giro d'Italia, Milan–San Remo and Tirreno–Adriatico. The race is ranked UCI ProSeries on the UCI continental calendar. The race was not run between the spring of 2007 and the autumn of 2012.

== Race dates ==
The position of the race in the European calendar has changed several times. Prior to 1987 the event was always seven days before Milan–San Remo and was seen as an important preparation race for the Spring Classics, however in 1987 Milano–Torino was switched to a date in October just before the Giro di Lombardia because the race organisers were not happy with the inclement weather conditions characterised by early March in northern Italy. In October the race became part of the "Trittico di Autunno" (Autumn Treble) along with the Giro del Piemonte and the Giro di Lombardia which were all run in the same week. In 2005 Milan–Torino returned to its traditional date in early March, however the 2008 edition again returned to a date in October exchanging dates with the Monte Paschi Eroica race which is now run in March. However the race did not take place in October 2008 and it was not run for the next four years until an agreement was reached in February 2012 between the race owners (RCS) and the Associazione Ciclistica Arona to organise the race for the next three years.

The 2000 edition of the race was not held because of torrential rain which caused catastrophic mud slides in the Piedmont area.

== Significant winners ==
Milano–Torino is one of the fastest of the classics, Walter Martin won the 1961 edition at an average speed of 45.094 kilometres per hour and this stood for a time as the fastest speed in a classic race until beaten by Marinio Vigna in the 1964 edition of the Tre Valli Varesine. Swiss rider Markus Zberg now holds the record average speed for the race when he won in 1999 at a speed of 45.75 kilometres per hour. The record for the most wins in Milano–Torino stands to the Italian Costante Girardengo who took five victories between 1914 and 1923. Pierino Favalli took a hat trick of wins between 1938 and 1940. Tour de France and Giro d'Italia winner, the late Marco Pantani almost died in the 1995 edition of Milano–Torino when police allowed a four-wheel drive vehicle onto the course by mistake; Pantani and two other riders ploughed into the vehicle. Pantani sustained multiple leg breaks and missed the entire 1996 season. In 2012 the winner was Alberto Contador, who won the first single day race in his pro career.

== Winners ==
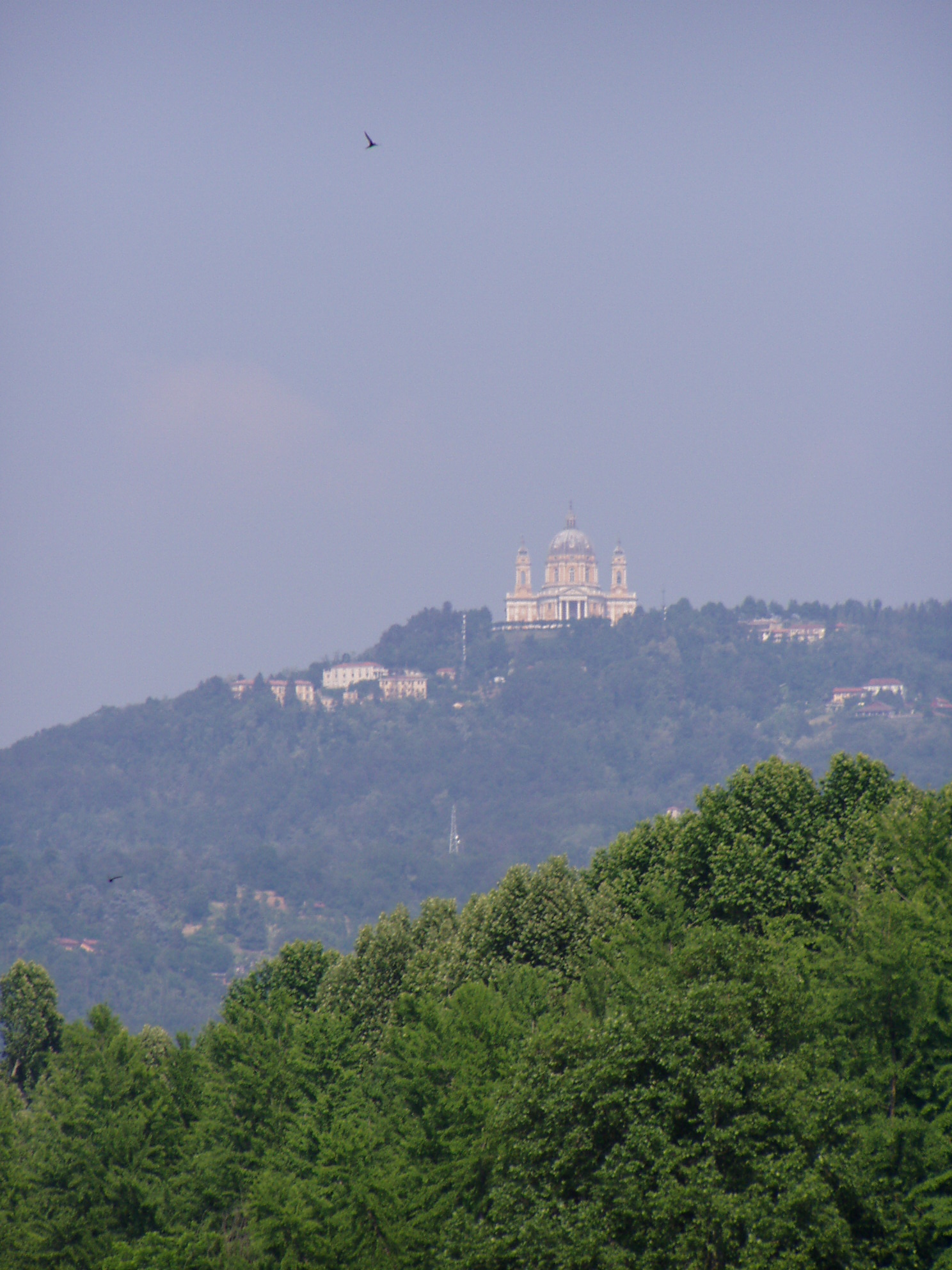
The Superga hill, historic decisive point of the race

Year	Country	Rider	Team
1876	Italy	Paolo Magretti	individual
1877– 1893	No race		
1894	Italy	Luigi Airaldi	individual
1895	No race		
1896	Italy	Giovanni Moro	individual
1897– 1902	No race		
1903	Italy	Giovanni Gerbi	Maino
1904	No race		
1905	Italy	Giovanni Rossignoli	Bianchi
1906– 1910	No race		
1911	France	Henri Pélissier	individual
1912	No race		
1913	Italy	Giuseppe Azzini	Otav
1914	Italy	Costante Girardengo	Maino–Dunlop
1915	Italy	Costante Girardengo	Bianchi
1916	No race		
1917	Switzerland	Oscar Egg	Bianchi
1918	Italy	Gaetano Belloni	Bianchi
1919	Italy	Costante Girardengo	Stucchi–Dunlop
1920	Italy	Costante Girardengo	Stucchi–Dunlop
1921	Italy	Federico Gay	Bianchi–Dunlop
1922	Italy	Adriano Zanaga	Ganna–Dunlop
1923	Italy	Costante Girardengo	Maino
1924	Italy	Federico Gay	Alcyon–Dunlop
1925	Italy	Adriano Zanaga	Ideor
1926– 1930	No race		
1931	Luxembourg	Giuseppe Graglia	individual
1932	Italy	Giuseppe Olmo	individual
1933	Luxembourg	Giuseppe Graglia	Bestetti–D'Alessandro
1934	Italy	Mario Cipriani	Fréjus
1935	Italy	Giovanni Gotti	Legnano–Wolsit
1936	Italy	Cesare Del Cancia	Ganna
1937	Italy	Giuseppe Martano	Tendil
1938	Italy	Pierino Favalli	Legnano
1939	Italy	Pierino Favalli	Legnano
1940	Italy	Pierino Favalli	Legnano
1941	Italy	Pietro Chiappini	Olympia
1942	Italy	Pietro Chiappini	Legnano
1943- 1944	No race		
1945	Italy	Vito Ortelli	Benotto
1946	Italy	Vito Ortelli	Benotto–Superga
1947	Italy	Italo De Zan	Lygie–Pirelli
1948	Italy	Sergio Maggini	Wilier Triestina
1949	Italy	Luigi Casola	Benotto–Superga
1950	Italy	Adolfo Grosso	Wilier Triestina
1951	Italy	Fiorenzo Magni	Ganna–Ursus
1952	Italy	Aldo Bini	Bianchi–Pirelli
1953	Italy	Luciano Maggini	Atala–Pirelli
1954	Italy	Agostino Coletto	Fréjus
1955	Italy	Cleto Maule	Torpado–Ursus
1956	Switzerland	Ferdinand Kübler	Carpano–Coppi
1957	Spain	Miguel Poblet	Ignis–Doniselli
1958	Italy	Agostino Coletto	Carpano
1959	Italy	Nello Fabbri	Bianchi–Pirelli
1960	Italy	Arnaldo Pambianco	Legnano
1961	Italy	Walter Martin	Carpano
1962	Italy	Franco Balmamion	Carpano
1963	Italy	Franco Cribiori	Gazzola
1964	Spain	Valentín Uriona	Kas–Kaskol
1965	Italy	Vito Taccone	Salvarani
1966	Italy	Marino Vigna	Vittadello
1967	Italy	Gianni Motta	Molteni
1968	Italy	Franco Bitossi	Filotex
1969	Italy	Claudio Michelotto	Max Meyer
1970	Italy	Luciano Armani	Scic
1971	Belgium	Georges Pintens	Hertekamp–Magniflex
1972	Belgium	Roger De Vlaeminck	Dreher
1973	Italy	Marcello Bergamo	Filotex
1974	Belgium	Roger De Vlaeminck	Brooklyn
1975	Italy	Wladimiro Panizza	Brooklyn
1976	Italy	Enrico Paolini	Scic
1977	Belgium	Rik Van Linden	Bianchi–Campagnolo
1978	Italy	Pierino Gavazzi	Zonca–Santini
1979	Italy	Alfio Vandi	Magniflex–Famcucine
1980	Italy	Giovanni Battaglin	Inoxpran
1981	Italy	Giuseppe Martinelli	Santini–Selle Italia
1982	Italy	Giuseppe Saronni	Del Tongo–Colnago
1983	Italy	Francesco Moser	Gis Gelati–Campagnolo
1984	Italy	Paolo Rosola	Bianchi–Piaggio
1985	Italy	Daniele Caroli	Santini–Krups
1986	No race		
1987	Australia	Phil Anderson	Panasonic–Isostar
1988	West Germany	Rolf Gölz	Superconfex–Yoko–Opel–Colnago
1989	West Germany	Rolf Gölz	Superconfex–Yoko–Opel–Colnago
1990	Switzerland	Mauro Gianetti	Helvetia–La Suisse
1991	Italy	Davide Cassani	Ariostea
1992	Italy	Gianni Bugno	Gatorade–Château d'Ax
1993	Denmark	Rolf Sørensen	Carrera Jeans–Tassoni
1994	Italy	Francesco Casagrande	Mercatone Uno–Medeghini
1995	Italy	Stefano Zanini	Gewiss–Ballan
1996	Italy	Daniele Nardello	Mapei–GB
1997	France	Laurent Jalabert	ONCE
1998	Switzerland	Niki Aebersold	Post Swiss Team
1999	Switzerland	Markus Zberg	Rabobank
2000	No race due to flooding		
2001	Italy	Mirko Celestino	Saeco
2002	Italy	Michele Bartoli	Fassa Bortolo
2003	Italy	Mirko Celestino	Saeco
2004	Spain	Marcos Serrano	Liberty Seguros
2005	Italy	Fabio Sacchi	Fassa Bortolo
2006	Spain	Igor Astarloa	Barloworld
2007	Italy	Danilo Di Luca	Liquigas
2008– 2011	No race		
2012	Spain	Alberto Contador	Saxo Bank–Tinkoff Bank
2013	Italy	Diego Ulissi	Lampre–Merida
2014	Italy	Giampaolo Caruso	Team Katusha
2015	Italy	Diego Rosa	Astana
2016	Colombia	Miguel Ángel López	Astana
2017	Colombia	Rigoberto Urán	Cannondale–Drapac
2018	France	Thibaut Pinot	Groupama–FDJ
2019	Canada	Michael Woods	EF Education First
2020	France	Arnaud Démare	Groupama–FDJ
2021	Slovenia	Primož Roglič	Team Jumbo–Visma
2022	Great Britain	Mark Cavendish	Quick-Step Alpha Vinyl Team
2023	Netherlands	Arvid de Kleijn	Tudor Pro Cycling Team
2024	Italy	Alberto Bettiol	EF Education–EasyPost
2025	Mexico	Isaac del Toro	UAE Team Emirates XRG
2026	Great Britain	Tom Pidcock	Pinarello–Q36.5 Pro Cycling Team

=== Wins per country ===
Wins	Country
74	Italy
5	Spain; Switzerland
4	Belgium; France
2	Colombia; Luxembourg; West Germany; Great Britain
1	Australia; Canada; Denmark; Mexico; Netherlands; Slovenia
