= Carpano (cycling team) =

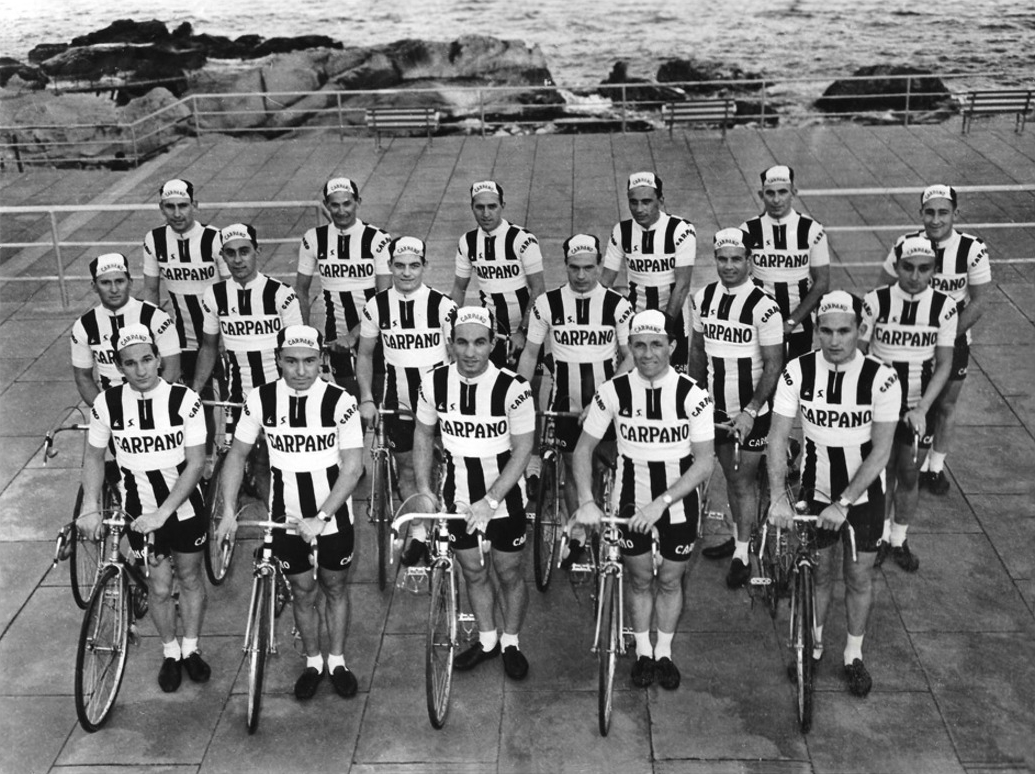
- The Carpano team of 1959

Team information
- Registered: Italy
- Founded: 1956
- Disbanded: 1966
- Discipline: Road

Team name history
- 1956–1957 1958–1964 1965–1966: Carpano–Coppi; Carpano; Sanson
Carpano jersey
Jersey

Carpano was an Italian professional cycling team that existed from 1956 to 1966. The team's main sponsor between 1956 and 1964 was the Turin-based wine company Carpano, with Fausto Coppi's bicycle company Coppi a co-sponsor for the first two seasons. When Carpano took sole sponsorship of the team, the team adopted black and white striped jerseys similar to the shirts worn by Turin's Juventus Football Club. For the final two years, 1965 and 1966, Italian food producer Sanson took over the sponsorship. Whilst with Carpano, Franco Balmamion won the general classification of the Giro d'Italia in 1962 and 1963.

== Major wins ==
1956
Milano–Torino, Ferdi Kübler
Stage 12 Giro d'Italia, Pietro Nascimbene
Stage 1 Critérium du Dauphiné, Jacques Dupont
Stage 2 Eisden, Victor Wartel

1957
Germany National Cyclo-cross Championships, Günther Debusmann
Stage 1 Paris–Nice, Désiré Keteleer
Stage 3 Paris–Nice, Jan Adriaensens
Tour of Flanders Fred De Bruyne
Paris–Roubaix, Fred De Bruyne
Stage 3 Roma–Napoli–Roma, Stefano Gaggero
Stage 4 Roma–Napoli–Roma, Michele Gismondi
Stage 8b Roma–Napoli–Roma, Fred De Bruyne
Stage 7 Vuelta a España, Jan Adriaensens
Stage 3 Tour de Suisse, Stefano Gaggero
Stage 7 Tour de Suisse, Colombo Cassano
Coppa Collecchio, Colombo Cassano
Trofeo Baracchi, Fausto Coppi

1958
Stage 2 Giro di Sardegna, Nino Defilippis
Stage 4 Giro di Sardegna, Germain Derycke
Milano–Torino, Agostino Coletto
Overall Paris–Nice, Fred De Bruyne

Stage 1, Pietro Nascimbene
Stage 4, Nino Defilippis
Stage 7, Giuseppe Favero

Stage 1 Dwars door Vlaanderen, Ernest Heyvaert
Tour of Flanders, Germain Derycke
Gent–Wevelgem, Gabriel Borra
Omloop Het Nieuwsblad, Joseph Planckaert
Stages 9 & 11 Giro d'Italia, Nino Defilippis
Stage 1 Tour de Suisse, Nino Defilippis
Overall Omloop van het Westen, Jan Adriaensens

Stages 2a & 2b, Jan Adriaensens

Stage 5 Tour de Suisse, Désiré Keteleer
Giro del Piemonte, Nino Defilippis
Tielt–Antwerpen–Tielt, Gabriel Borra
Stages 1, 6 & 7 Tour de l'Ouest, Nino Defilippis
Circuito Ciclistico di Ciriè, Giuseppe Favero
Stage 1 part a Giro del Lazio : Nino Defilippis
Overall Giro del Lazio, Nino Defilippis

Stage 1a, Nino Defilippis
Stage 1b (TTT)

Overall Desgrange-Colombo, Fred De Bruyne
Giro di Lombardia, Nino Defilippis

1959
Stage 10 Paris–Nice, Michel Van Aerde
Stage 2 Dwars door Vlaanderen, Julien Schepens
Luik–Bastenaken–Luik, Fred De Bruyne
Stage 3 Tour de Romandie, Angelo Conterno
Stage 9 Giro d'Italia, Gastone Nencini
Stage 12 Giro d'Italia, Nino Defilippis
Kapellen–Glabbeek, Louis Proost
GP Raf Jonckheere, Gilbert Desmet
Grote Prijs Marcel Kint, Gilbert Desmet
Giro del Ticino, Angelo Conterno
GP Briek Schotte, Gilbert Desmet
Overall Meulebeke, Gilbert Desmet

Stage 1b, Gilbert Desmet

1960
Ronde van Limburg, Willy Vannitsen
Stage 1 Paris–Nice, Yvo Molenaers
Stage 3Paris–Nice, Gilbert Desmet
Overall Menton–Roma, Gilbert Desmet

Stage 1, Gilbert Desmet
Stage 3, Gastone Nencini
Stage 4a, Nino Defilippis

Omloop van de Fruitstreek, Martin Van Geneugden
Brussel–Charleroi–Brussel, Louis Proost
Roubaix–Cassel–Roubaix, Louis Proost
Omloop van Limburg Martin Van Geneugden
Stages 5 & 10 Giro d'Italia, Gastone Nencini
Stage 3 Tour de Suisse, Walter Martin
GP Gemeente Kortemark, Gilbert Desmet
GP Briek Schotte, Gilbert Desmet
Stage 1 Brussel–Sint-Truiden, Willy Vannitsen

1961
Ronde van Limburg, Martin Van Geneugden
Milano–Torino, Walter Martin
Omloop van de Fruitstreek, Martin Van Geneugden
Omloop van Limburg, Willy Vannitsen
Stage 7 Roma–Napoli–Roma, Diego Ronchini
Stage 5 Deutschland Tour, Louis Proost
Stage 7 Deutschland Tour, Martin Van Geneugden
Omloop van Midden-Brabant, Willy Vannitsen
Stages 2 & 4a Tour of Belgium, Louis Proost
Omloop der drie Proviniciën, Michel Van Aerde
La Flèche Wallonne, Willy Vannitsen
Stage 5 Giro d'Italia, Louis Proost
Stage 6 Giro d'Italia, Nino Defilippis
Overall Tour de Suisse, Attilio Moresi

Stage 5, Kurt Gimmi

Omloop van het Houtland, Florent Van Pollaert
Tre Valli Varesine, Willy Vannitsen
Giro dell'Emilia Diego Ronchini

1962
Stages 2 & 6 Giro di Sardegna, Antonio Bailetti
Milano–Torino, Franco Balmamion
Stage 1b Tour of Belgium, Michel Van Aerde
Italy National Road Race Championships, Nino Defilippis
Omloop van de Fruitstreek, Roger De Coninck
Omloop der drie Proviniciën, Gilbert Desmet
Overall Giro d'Italia, Franco Balmamion

Stage 4 Antonio Bailetti
Stage 19, Giuseppe Sartore

Stage 5 Tour de Suisse, Gilbert Desmet
Stage 9 Tour de France, Antonio Bailetti
Stages 1 & 3 Giro della Valle d'Aosta, Italo Zilioli

1963
Stage 3a Tour de Romandie, Giuseppe Sartore
Overall Giro d'Italia, Franco Balmamion

Stages 5, 6, & 17, Mino Bariviera
Stage 7, Nino Defilippis
Stage 21, Antonio Bailetti

Stage 1 Tour de Suisse, Italo Zilioli
Stage 2 Tour de Suisse, Loris Guernieri
Stage 5 Tour de Suisse, Kurt Gimmi
Stage 5 Tour de France, Antonio Bailetti
Giro dell'Emilia, Italo Zilioli

1964
Stage 6 Giro d'Italia, Mino Bariviera
Stage 13 Giro d'Italia, Giorgo Zancanaro
Coppa Agostoni, Italo Zilioli

1965
Stage 3 Giro d'Italia, Luciano Galbo
Stage 18 Giro d'Italia, Italo Zilioli
Giro del Ticino, Italo Zilioli

1966
Stage 3 Tirreno–Adriatico, Raffaele Marcoli
Stages 5 & 22 Giro d'Italia, Mino Bariviera
Stage 6 Giro d'Italia, Raffaele Marcoli
Stage 2 Tour de Suisse, Carlo Chiappano
Stages 3 & 5 Tour de Suisse, Mario da Dalt
Coppa Bernocchi, Raffaele Marcoli
