= Weekend ardennais =

Week-end ardennais
Race details
- Date: April, May
- English name: Ardennes Weekend
- Local name(s): Weekend ardennais (in French), Ardeens Weekend (in Dutch)
- Discipline: Road

History
- First edition: 1950
- Editions: 20 (as of 2022)
- First winner: Raymond Impanis (BEL)
- Most wins: Frans Schoubben (BEL); Ferdi Kübler (SUI) (2 wins)
- Most recent: Laurent Jalabert (FRA)

The Ardennes Weekend was an overall points classification based on the results of two Belgian classic cycling races: La Flèche Wallonne and Liège-Bastogne-Liège.

It was created in 1950, and included, only that year, a third race, Liège-Courcelles. This classification first existed until 1964. It disappeared when the Flèche Wallonne became independent: from 1965 onwards, it was no longer held on the same weekend as Liège-Bastogne-Liège, but three days before.

In 1993, Amaury Sport Organisation bought La Flèche Wallonne, three years after acquiring Liège-Bastogne-Liège. Consequently, the Ardennes Weekend was recreated, from 1993 to 1997.

Jan Storms and Rolf Wolfshohl won the Ardennes weekend while they have never won either the Flèche Wallonne or Liège-Bastogne-Liège.

== Palmares ==
| Year | Winner | Second | Third |
| 1950 | (Belgium) Raymond Impanis | (Belgium) Prosper Depredomme | (Italy) Fausto Coppi |
| 1951 | (Switzerland) Ferdi Kübler | (France) Jean Robic | (Italy) Gino Bartali |
| 1952 | (Switzerland) Ferdi Kübler | (France) Jean Robic | (Belgium) Raymond Impanis |
| 1953 | (Belgium) Jan Storms | (Belgium) Stan Ockers | (Belgium) Alois De Hertog |
| 1954 | (Luxembourg) Marcel Ernzer | (Switzerland) Ferdi Kübler | (Belgium) Raymond Impanis |
| 1955 | (Belgium) Stan Ockers | (Belgium) Jean Brankart | (Belgium) Jan Adriaensens |
| 1956 | (Belgium) Richard Van Genechten | (Belgium) André Vlayen | (Italy) Sante Ranucci |
| 1957 | (Belgium) Frans Schoubben | (Belgium) Joseph Planckaert | (Belgium) Raymond Impanis |
| 1958 | (Belgium) Alfred De Bruyne | (Belgium) Raymond Impanis | (France) Pierre Everaert |
| 1959 | (Belgium) Frans Schoubben | (Belgium) Frans De Mulder | (Belgium) Alfred De Bruyne |
| 1960 | (Netherlands) Albertus Geldermans | (Belgium) Rik Van Looy | (France) Pierre Everaert |
| 1961 | (Belgium) Rik Van Looy | (Belgium) Armand Desmet | (France) Marcel Rohrbach |
| 1962 | (West Germany) Rolf Wolfshohl | (Belgium) Henri De Wolf | (Belgium) Armand Desmet |
| 1963 | (France) Raymond Poulidor | (Belgium) Pino Cerami | (Netherlands) Jan Janssen |
| 1964 | (Belgium) Willy Bocklant | (Belgium) Georges Van Coningsloo | (Italy) Vittorio Adorni |
| 1993 | (Italy) Maurizio Fondriest | | |
| 1994 | (Russia) Evgueni Berzin | | |
| 1995 | (France) Laurent Jalabert | | |
| 1996 | (United States) Lance Armstrong | | |
| 1997 | (France) Laurent Jalabert | | |
