= 1950 La Flèche Wallonne =

Race details
- Dates: 1 May 1950
- Stages: 1
- Distance: 235 km (146.0 mi)
- Winning time: 6h 24' 40"

Results
	Winner	Fausto Coppi (ITA)
	Second	Raymond Impanis (BEL)
	Third	Jan Storms (BEL)

The 1950 La Flèche Wallonne was the 14th edition of La Flèche Wallonne cycle race and was held on 1 May 1950. The race started in Charleroi and finished in Liège. The race was won by Fausto Coppi.

== General classification ==
Final general classification

Rank	Rider	Time
1	Fausto Coppi (ITA)	6h 24' 40"
2	Raymond Impanis (BEL)	+ 5' 05"
3	Jan Storms (BEL)	+ 5' 05"
4	Marcel De Mulder (BEL)	+ 5' 05"
5	Maurice Blomme (BEL)	+ 5' 05"
6	René Walschot (BEL)	+ 5' 05"
7	Lionel Van Brabant (BEL)	+ 5' 05"
8	Joseph Verhaert (BEL)	+ 5' 05"
9	Eduard Van Ende (BEL)	+ 5' 05"
10	Jean Breuer (BEL)	+ 5' 05"
