= Schelde–Dender–Leie =

Belgian cycling race

Schelde-Dender-Leie
Race details
- Date: May, June
- Region: Flanders, Belgium
- English name: Scheldt-Lys-Dender
- Local name(s): Schelde-Dender-Leie (in Dutch)
- Discipline: Road
- Competition: Cat. 1.2
- Type: One-day race

History
- First edition: 1947
- Editions: 19
- Final edition: 1965
- First winner: Désiré Keteleer (BEL)
- Most wins: Henri Van Kerckhove (BEL); (2 wins)
- Final winner: Léopold Van Den Neste (BEL)

Schelde-Dender-Leie was a Belgian post-WW II cycling race organized for the last time in 1965.

Aalst was both start and finish place. The course, variating between 165 and 252 km, was situated in the valleys of the rivers Scheldt, Dender and Lys.

== Winners ==
Year	Winner	Second	Third
1947	(Belgium) Désiré Keteleer	(Belgium) Gustaaf Van Overloop	(Belgium) Lucien Mathys
1948	(Belgium) August Van Gaever	(Belgium) Achiel Buysse	(Belgium) Lucien Mathys
1949	(Belgium) Georges Desplenter	(Belgium) Emile Rogiers	(Belgium) Eugeen Van Roosbroeck
1950	(Belgium) Maurice Van Herzele	(Belgium) Marcel Boumon	(Belgium) Jules Depooter
1951	(Belgium) Roger Decorte	(Belgium) Lucien Mathys	(Belgium) Robert Vanderstockt
1952	(Belgium) Marcel Ryckaert	(Belgium) Marcel Boumon	(Belgium) Liévin Lerno
1953	(Belgium) Henri Van Kerckhove	(Belgium) Jean Vandervelde	(Belgium) Aloïs Van Steenkiste
1954	(Belgium) Henri Van Kerckhove	(Belgium) Alfred De Bruyne	(Belgium) Omer Braeckevelt
1955	(Belgium) Marcel Janssens	(Belgium) Jan Adriaensens	(Belgium) Calixte Van Steenbrugge
1956	(Belgium) Jozef Schils	(Belgium) Jan Zagers	(Belgium) Henri Van Kerckhove
1957	(Belgium) Jaak De Boever	(Belgium) Henri Van Kerckhove	(Belgium) Armand Desmet
1958	(Belgium) Maurice Meuleman	(Belgium) Roger Devoldere	(Belgium) André Auquier
1959	(Netherlands) Piet van den Brekel	(Belgium) Jan Van Gompel	(Belgium) Norbert Kerckhove
1960	(Belgium) Arthur Decabooter	(Belgium) Jozef Schils	(Belgium) Camille Buysse
1961	(Belgium) Gustaaf Van Vaerenbergh	(Belgium) Joseph Planckaert	(Belgium) Frans Aerenhouts
1962	(Belgium) Frans Melckenbeeck	(Belgium) Rik Van Looy	(Belgium) Jozef Schils
1963	(Belgium) Léon Gevaert	(Belgium) Frans Melckenbeeck	(Belgium) André Noyelle
1964	(Belgium) Théo Mertens	(Belgium) Frans Melckenbeeck	(Belgium) Georges Vandenberghe
1965	(Belgium) Léopold Van Den Neste	(Belgium) Eddy Merckx	(Belgium) Sylvain Henckaerts
