= 1953 Paris–Nice =

Race details
- Dates: 12–15 March 1953
- Stages: 4
- Distance: 1,094 km (679.8 mi)
- Winning time: 32h 28' 33"

Results
	Winner	Jean-Pierre Munch (FRA)
	Second	Roger Walkowiak (FRA)
	Third	Roger Bertaz (FRA)

The 1953 Paris–Nice was the 11th edition of the Paris–Nice cycle race and was held from 12 March to 15 March 1953. The race started in Paris and finished in Nice. The race was won by Jean-Pierre Munch.

== General classification ==
Final general classification

Rank	Rider	Time
1	Jean-Pierre Munch (FRA)	32h 28' 33"
2	Roger Walkowiak (FRA)	+ 3' 18"
3	Roger Bertaz (FRA)	+ 3' 21"
4	Maurice Blomme (BEL)	+ 4' 46"
5	Marcel Guitard (FRA)	+ 6' 09"
6	Ugo Anzile (ITA)	+ 6' 11"
7	Jean Bobet (FRA)	+ 6' 38"
8	Jean Robic (FRA)	+ 7' 00"
9	Roger Decock (BEL)	+ 7' 56"
10	Marcel Huber (SUI)	+ 10' 07"
