= GP Stad Vilvoorde =

Cycling road race in Belgium

Race details
- Date: April
- Region: Flemish Brabant, Belgium
- English name: Grand Prix of the City of Vilvoorde
- Local name: Grote Prijs Stad Vilvoorde (in Dutch)
- Discipline: Road
- Competition: UCI Europe Tour
- Type: One-day race

History
- First edition: 1931
- Editions: 84 (as of 2019)
- First winner: Edward Huygens (BEL)
- Most wins: Wim Omloop (BEL); Theo Middelkamp (NED); (2 wins)
- Most recent: Gerry Druyts (BEL)

The GP Stad Vilvoorde is a single-day cycle race held each year in and around the Belgian city of Vilvoorde. The race was first organized in 1931.

The race was Eddy Merckx's first professional win, with his victory in the 1965 edition.

== Winners ==
Year	Winner	Second	Third
1931	(Belgium) Edward Huygens	(Belgium) Léon Louyet	(Belgium) René Malbrecq
1932	(Belgium) Odile Van Hevel	(Belgium) Georges De Witte	(Belgium) Georges Lemaire
1933	(Belgium) Georges Lemaire	(Belgium) Richard Noterman	(Belgium) Leopold Gérard
1934	(Belgium) Alfred Hamerlinck	(Belgium) Frans Dictus	(Belgium) Edward Vissers
1935	(Belgium) Frans Van Loock	(Belgium) Edward Vissers	(Belgium) Jean Wauters
1936	(Netherlands) Theo Middelkamp	(Belgium) Michel D'Hooghe	(Belgium) André Defoort
1937	(Belgium) Éloi Meulenberg	(Belgium) Michel D'Hooghe	(Belgium) Alfons Schepers
1938	(Belgium) Frans Demondt	(Belgium) Théo Pirmez	(Belgium) Maurice Croon
1939	(Netherlands) Jan Gommers	(Belgium) Louis Hardiquest	(Belgium) Sylvain Grysolle
1940	(Belgium) Achiel Buysse	(Belgium) Sylvain Grysolle	(Belgium) Frans Demondt
1941-1942	No race		
1943	(Belgium) Adolphe Vandenbossche	(Belgium) Lode Janssens	(Belgium) Eugène Kiewit
1944	No race		
1945	(Belgium) Maurice Desimpelaere	(Belgium) Albert Sercu	(Belgium) Désiré Keteleer
1946	(Russia) Albert Anutchin	(Belgium) Raymond Impanis	(Belgium) Fred Seynaeve
1947	(Belgium) Albert Sercu	(Belgium) Michel Remue	(Belgium) Briek Schotte
1948	(Netherlands) Theo Middelkamp	(Belgium) Michel Remue	(Belgium) Jules Depoorter
1949	(Belgium) Alberic Schotte	(Belgium) Jozef Van Der Helst	(Belgium) Raymond Impanis
1950	(Belgium) Edward Van Dyck	(Belgium) Valère Lowie	(Belgium) Raphaël Jonckheere
1951	(Belgium) Jean Bogaerts	(Belgium) Raymond Impanis	(Belgium) Henri Serin
1952	(Belgium) René Mertens	(Belgium) Jan Storms	(Belgium) Henri Van Kerkhove
1953	(Belgium) Joseph Plas	(Belgium) Raphaël Glorieux	(France) Albert Dolhats
1954	(Belgium) Maurice Blomme	(Belgium) Alfred De Bruyne	(Netherlands) Wim van Est
1955	(Belgium) Jozef Schils	(Belgium) Jan Storms	(Belgium) Albert Denil
1956	(Netherlands) Wim van Est	(Belgium) Désiré Keteleer	(Belgium) Jacques Schoubben
1957	(Belgium) André Noyelle	(Belgium) Leopold Schaeken	(Belgium) René Mertens
1958	(Belgium) Jean Vliegen	(Belgium) Piet Oellibrandt	(Belgium) Henri Van den Bossche
1959	(Belgium) Rik Van Looy	(Belgium) Victor Wartel	(Netherlands) Gerrit Voorting
1960	(Belgium) Victor Wartel	(Belgium) Leopold Schaeken	(Belgium) Norbert Kerckhove
1961	(Belgium) Leopold Schaeken	(Belgium) Gabriel Borra	(Belgium) Jozef Mariën
1962	(Belgium) Willy Schroeders	(Belgium) Roger De Coninck	(Belgium) Théo Nijs
1963	(Belgium) Lode Troonbeeckx	(Netherlands) Leon Sebregts	(Belgium) Gentiel Saelens
1964	(Belgium) Frans Brands	(Belgium) Walter Muylaert	(Belgium) Marcel Ongenae
1965	(Belgium) Eddy Merckx	(Belgium) Emile Daems	(Belgium) Bernard Van De Kerkhove
1966	(Belgium) Jan Lauwers	(Belgium) Henri Pauwels	(Belgium) Albert Van Vlierberghe
1967	(Belgium) Jacques De Boever	(Belgium) Jan Lauwers	(Belgium) Martin Van Den Bossche
1968	(Belgium) Jean-Baptiste Claes	(Belgium) Willy Vekemans	(Belgium) Julien Delocht
1969	(Belgium) Alfons De Bal	(Belgium) Léopold Van den Neste	(Belgium) Roger De Vlaeminck
1970	(Netherlands) Jos van der Vleuten	(Belgium) Englebert Opdebeeck	(Belgium) Lucien Willekens
1971	(Belgium) Julien Stevens	(Belgium) Maurice Dury	(Belgium) Ronny Van de Vijver
1972	(Netherlands) Harm Ottenbros	(Belgium) Jean-Pierre Berckmans	(Belgium) Jacques De Boever
1973	(Belgium) Dirk Baert	(Belgium) Aimé Delaere	(Belgium) Paul Aerts
1974	(Belgium) Leopold Van den Neste	(Belgium) Tony Gakens	(Belgium) Maurice Dury
1975-1976	No race		
1977	(Belgium) Frans Verbeeck	(Belgium) Joseph Huysmans	(Belgium) André Dierickx
1978	(Belgium) Gery Verlinden	(Belgium) Eddy Verstraeten	(Belgium) Gustave Van Roosbroeck
1979	No race		
1980	(Netherlands) Leo Van Vliet	(Netherlands) Adri van Houwelingen	(Belgium) Eddy Verstraeten
1981	(Belgium) Willy Desmet	(Belgium) Paul Wellens	(Italy) Walter Dalgal
1982	(Belgium) Benjamin Van der Auwera	(Belgium) Guido Van Sweevelt	(Belgium) Alain Van Hoornweder
1983	(Belgium) Ludo Schurgers	(Belgium) Kurt Dockx	(Belgium) Daniel Rossel
1984	(Netherlands) Cees Priem	(Netherlands) Leo van Vliet	(Belgium) Patrick Deneut
1985	(Belgium) Willy Teirlinck	(Belgium) Dirk De Wolf	(Netherlands) Jelle Nijdam
1986	(Belgium) Herman Frison	(Belgium) Alain De Roo	(Belgium) Rudy Patry
1987	(Belgium) Jean-Pierre Heynderickx	(Belgium) Guido Verdeyen	(Belgium) Bruno Bruyere
1988	(Belgium) Jan Bogaert	(Netherlands) Gert Jakobs	(Belgium) Kurt Van Keirsbulck
1989	(Belgium) Benny Heylen	(Belgium) Koen Van Rooy	(Belgium) Marc Sprangers
1990	(Belgium) Jerry Cooman	(Belgium) Eric Vanderaerden	(Netherlands) Wiebren Veenstra
1991	(Belgium) Ludo Giesberts	(Belgium) Peter Huyghe	(Belgium) Johan Remels
1992	(Belgium) Patrick Van Roosbroeck	(Belgium) Peter Spaenhoven	(Netherlands) Marc van Orsouw
1993	(Belgium) Eddy Van Craeynest	(Ukraine) Alexandr Ukianov	(Belgium) Alain Van der Borght
1994	(Netherlands) Wiebren Veenstra	(Belgium) Gert Van Brabant	(Belgium) Ludo Dierckxsens
1995	(Belgium) Hans De Meester	(Belgium) Mario Moermans	(Belgium) Willy Willems
1996	(Belgium) Ludo Dierckxsens	(Belgium) Ronny Assez	(Belgium) Hans De Meester
1997	(Belgium) Nico Renders	(Belgium) Ludo Dierckxsens	(Belgium) Erwin Thijs
1998	(Belgium) Wim Omloop	(Belgium) Jamo Vanfrachem	(Belgium) Tom Stremersch
1999	(Belgium) Wim Omloop	(Belgium) Kris Gerits	(Belgium) Geert Omloop
2000	(France) Guillaume Auger	(Belgium) Danny Baeyens	(Belgium) Karl Pauwels
2001	(Belgium) Christophe Stevens	(Belgium) Peter Schoonjans	(Belgium) Björn Leukemans
2002	(Belgium) Andy Cappelle	(Belgium) Jan Kuyckx	(Belgium) David Meys
2003	(Netherlands) Gerben Löwik	(France) Geoffroy Lequatre	(Netherlands) Rik Reinerink
2004	(Belgium) Steve Schets	(United Kingdom) Hamish Haynes	(Belgium) Bruno Taelman
2005	(Lithuania) Darius Strole	(Belgium) David Meys	(Belgium) Daniel Verelst
2006	(Belgium) Kevyn Ista	(Belgium) Jan Bluekens	(Belgium) Kevin Putseys
2007	(Belgium) Michael Van Staeyen	(Kazakhstan) Valentin Iglinskiy	(Netherlands) Ronald Roos
2008	(Belgium) Kris Boeckmans	(United Kingdom) Adam Blythe	(Belgium) Koen Beeckman
2009	(Belgium) Sven François	(Belgium) Patrick Cocquyt	(Belgium) Jeroen Dingemans
2010	(Belgium) Sven Wielandt	(Belgium) Justin Van Houcke	(Belgium) Jurgen van Trijp
2011	(Belgium) Björn Coomans	(Belgium) Jurgen Guns	(Belgium) Dieter Verbeek
2012	(Belgium) Pieter Cordeel	(Belgium) Kevin Suarez	(Belgium) Tommy Baeyens
2013	(Belgium) Kenneth Van Rooy	(United States) Thomas Gibbons	(New Zealand) Ryan Wills
2014	(Netherlands) Paul Moerland	(Switzerland) Tristan Marguet	(Belgium) Bert Van der Trappen
2015	(Finland) Matti Helminen	(Belgium) Julien Kaise	(Australia) Edward Bissaker
2016	(Belgium) David Motte	(Belgium) Rutger Roelandts	(Belgium) Glenn Debruyne
2017	(Belgium) Francesco Van Coppernolle	(Belgium) Robin Mertens	(Albania) Ylber Sefa
2018	(Belgium) Niels Vandyck	(Belgium) Glenn Loenders	(Belgium) Ward Van Laer
2019	(Belgium) Gerry Druyts	(Belgium) Rutger Wouters	(Netherlands) Jesse Huijbregts
