= 1953 Paris–Roubaix =

Cycling race

Race details
- Dates: 12 April 1953
- Stages: 1
- Distance: 245 km (152.2 mi)
- Winning time: 5h 39' 19"

Results
	Winner	Germain Derycke (BEL)
	Second	Donato Piazza (ITA)
	Third	Wout Wagtmans (NED)

The 1953 Paris–Roubaix was the 51st edition of the Paris–Roubaix, a classic one-day cycle race in France. The single day event was held on 12 April 1953 and stretched 245 km (152 mi) from Paris to the finish at Roubaix Velodrome. The winner was Germain Derycke from Belgium.

== Results ==
Final results (1–10)
Rank	Cyclist	Time
1	Germain Derycke (BEL)	5h 39' 19″
2	Donato Piazza (ITA)	+0' 00″
3	Wout Wagtmans (NED)	+0' 00″
4	Louison Bobet (FRA)	+0' 33″
5	Émile Baffert (FRA)	+0' 33″
6	Roger Decock (BEL)	+0' 14″
7	Raymond Impanis (BEL)	+0' 14″
8	Désiré Keteleer (BEL)	+0' 14″
9	Gilbert Bauvin (FRA)	+0' 14″
10	Maurice Blomme (FRA)	+0' 14″
