= 1954 Liège–Bastogne–Liège =

Race details
- Dates: 9 May 1954
- Stages: 1
- Distance: 236 km (147 mi)
- Winning time: 6h 56' 16"

Results
	Winner	Marcel Ernzer (LUX)
	Second	Raymond Impanis (BEL)
	Third	Ferdinand Kübler (SUI)

The 1954 Liège–Bastogne–Liège was the 40th edition of the Liège–Bastogne–Liège cycle race and was held on 9 May 1954. The race started and finished in Liège. The race was won by Marcel Ernzer.

== General classification ==
Final general classification

Rank	Rider	Time
1	Marcel Ernzer (LUX)	6h 56' 16"
2	Raymond Impanis (BEL)	+ 2' 40"
3	Ferdinand Kübler (SUI)	+ 3' 51"
4	Henri Van Kerckhove (BEL)	+ 4' 20"
5	Marcel De Mulder (BEL)	+ 4' 20"
6	Raoul Rémy (FRA)	+ 4' 28"
7	Roger Decock (BEL)	+ 4' 28"
8	Maurice Quentin (FRA)	+ 4' 28"
9	Alfons Van den Brande (BEL)	+ 4' 28"
10	Pino Cerami (BEL)	+ 4' 28"
