= Vansteenkiste =

Vansteenkiste is a Dutch surname. Notable people with the surname include:

- Alois Vansteenkiste (1928–1991), Belgian cyclist
- Jade Vansteenkiste (born 2003), Belgian artistic gymnast
- Jannes Vansteenkiste (born 1993), Belgian footballer
- Vicente Vansteenkiste (1939–2021), Argentine rower
