= 1956 Omloop Het Volk =

Race details
- Dates: 11 March 1956
- Stages: 1
- Distance: 227 km (141 mi)
- Winning time: 6h 04' 00"

Results
	Winner	Ernest Sterckx (BEL)
	Second	Briek Schotte (BEL)
	Third	Leopold Schaeken (BEL)

The 1956 Omloop Het Volk was the 12th edition of the Omloop Het Volk cycle race and was held on 11 March 1956. The race started and finished in Ghent. The race was won by Ernest Sterckx.

== General classification ==
Final general classification
Rank	Rider	Time
1	Ernest Sterckx (BEL)	6h 04' 00"
2	Briek Schotte (BEL)	+ 0"
3	Leopold Schaeken (BEL)	+ 26"
4	Roger Decock (BEL)	+ 26"
5	Wim van Est (NED)	+ 26"
6	Marcel Ryckaert (BEL)	+ 26"
7	Raymond Impanis (BEL)	+ 26"
8	Rik Van Looy (BEL)	+ 26"
9	Raymond Decorte (BEL)	+ 26"
10	Jozef De Feyter (BEL)	+ 26"
