= 1953 Gent–Wevelgem =

Race details
- Dates: 29 March 1953
- Stages: 1
- Distance: 240 km (150 mi)
- Winning time: 7h 16' 00"

Results
	Winner	Raymond Impanis (BEL)
	Second	Wim van Est (NED)
	Third	Germain Derycke (BEL)

The 1953 Gent–Wevelgem was the 15th edition of the Belgian Gent–Wevelgem cycle race and was held on 29 March 1953. The race started in Ghent and finished in Wevelgem. The race was won by Raymond Impanis.

== General classification ==
Final general classification

Rank	Rider	Time
1	Raymond Impanis (BEL)	7h 16' 00"
2	Wim van Est (NED)	+ 1' 20"
3	Germain Derycke (BEL)	+ 2' 30"
4	Rik Van Steenbergen (BEL)	+ 2' 34"
5	Désiré Keteleer (BEL)	+ 2' 34"
6	Hein van Breenen (NED)	+ 3' 20"
7	Jean Storms (BEL)	+ 5' 12"
8	André Rosseel (BEL)	+ 5' 12"
9	Roger Decock (BEL)	+ 5' 12"
10	Boudewijn Devos (BEL)	+ 11' 18"
