= 1954 Paris–Roubaix =

Cycling race

Race details
- Dates: 11 April 1954
- Stages: 1
- Distance: 246 km (153 mi)
- Winning time: 6h 54' 43"

Results
	Winner	Raymond Impanis (BEL)
	Second	Constant Ockers (BEL)
	Third	Marcel Rijckaert (BEL)

The 1954 Paris–Roubaix was the 52nd edition of the Paris–Roubaix, a classic one-day cycle race in France. The single day event was held on 11 April 1954 and stretched 246 km (153 mi) from Paris to the finish at Roubaix Velodrome. The winner was Raymond Impanis from Belgium.

== Results ==
Final results (1–10)
Rank	Cyclist	Time
1	Raymond Impanis (BEL)	6h 54' 43″
2	Constant Ockers (BEL)	+0' 06″
3	Marcel Rijckaert (BEL)	+0' 06″
4	Ferdinand Kübler (SUI)	+0' 06″
5	Serge Blusson (FRA)	+0' 06″
6	Raoul Rémy (FRA)	+0' 06″
7	Marcel De Mulder (BEL)	+0' 06″
8	Germain Derijcke (BEL)	+0' 06″
9	Henri Surbatis (FRA)	+0' 06″
10	Roger Decock (BEL)	+0' 06″
