= 1960 Paris–Nice =

Race details
- Dates: 9–16 March 1960
- Stages: 8
- Distance: 1,252 km (778.0 mi)
- Winning time: 32h 15' 45"

Results
Jersey awarded to the overall winner	Winner	Raymond Impanis (BEL)	(Faema)
	Second	François Mahé (FRA)	(Rapha–Gitane–Dunlop)
	Third	Robert Cazala (FRA)	(Mercier–BP–Hutchinson)

The 1960 Paris–Nice was the 18th edition of the Paris–Nice cycle race and was held from 9 March to 16 March 1960. The race started in Paris and finished in Nice. The race was won by Raymond Impanis of the Faema team.

== General classification ==
Final general classification

Rank	Rider	Team	Time
1	Raymond Impanis (BEL)	Faema	32h 15' 45"
2	François Mahé (FRA)	Rapha–Gitane–Dunlop	+ 2' 26"
3	Robert Cazala (FRA)	Mercier–BP–Hutchinson	+ 2' 32"
4	Henry Anglade (FRA)	Liberia–Grammont	+ 3' 13"
5	Claude Colette (FRA)	Peugeot–BP–Dunlop	+ 3' 33"
6	Edgard Sorgeloos (BEL)	Faema	+ 3' 50"
7	Francis Anastasi (FRA)	Coupry–Margnat	+ 5' 18"
8	René Privat (FRA)	Mercier–BP–Hutchinson	+ 6' 29"
9	Antonin Rolland (FRA)	Coupry–Margnat	+ 6' 40"
10	Jean Bonifassi (FRA)	Liberia–Grammont	+ 7' 35"
