= 1952 Omloop Het Volk =

Race details
- Dates: 9 March 1952
- Stages: 1
- Distance: 221 km (137 mi)
- Winning time: 6h 01' 42"

Results
	Winner	Ernest Sterckx (BEL)
	Second	Raymond Impanis (BEL)
	Third	André Declerck (BEL)

The 1952 Omloop Het Volk was the eighth edition of the Omloop Het Volk cycle race and was held on 9 March 1952. The race started and finished in Ghent. The race was won by Ernest Sterckx.

== General classification ==
Final general classification
Rank	Rider	Time
1	Ernest Sterckx (BEL)	6h 01' 42"
2	Raymond Impanis (BEL)	+ 0"
3	André Declerck (BEL)	+ 0"
4	Gerard Buyl (BEL)	+ 0"
5	Wout Wagtmans (NED)	+ 0"
6	Jan Storms (BEL)	+ 0"
7	Pino Cerami (BEL)	+ 0"
8	Valère Ollivier (BEL)	+ 1' 55"
9	Lode Anthonis (BEL)	+ 1' 55"
10	Karel De Baere (BEL)	+ 1' 55"
