= 1952 Gent–Wevelgem =

Race details
- Dates: 3 April 1952
- Stages: 1
- Distance: 240 km (150 mi)
- Winning time: 6h 27' 00"

Results
	Winner	Raymond Impanis (BEL)
	Second	Maurice Blomme (BEL)
	Third	Alois De Hertog (BEL)

The 1952 Gent–Wevelgem was the 14th edition of the Belgian Gent–Wevelgem cycle race and was held on 3 April 1952. The race started in Ghent and finished in Wevelgem. The race was won by Raymond Impanis.

== General classification ==
Final general classification

Rank	Rider	Time
1	Raymond Impanis (BEL)	6h 27' 00"
2	Maurice Blomme (BEL)	+ 0"
3	Alois De Hertog (BEL)	+ 0"
4	André Rosseel (BEL)	+ 1' 38"
5	Jacques Marinelli (FRA)	+ 1' 38"
6	Roger De Corte (BEL)	+ 4' 05"
7	Alois Vansteenkiste (BEL)	+ 4' 05"
8	Gilbert Vermote (BEL)	+ 4' 05"
9	Arthur Mommerency (BEL)	+ 5' 23"
10	Lode Wouters (BEL)	+ 5' 23"
