= 1957 La Flèche Wallonne =

Race details
- Dates: 4 May 1957
- Stages: 1
- Distance: 226 km (140.4 mi)
- Winning time: 6h 01' 49"

Results
	Winner	Raymond Impanis (BEL)
	Second	René Privat (FRA)
	Third	Victor Wartel (BEL)

The 1957 La Flèche Wallonne was the 21st edition of La Flèche Wallonne cycle race and was held on 4 May 1957. The race started in Charleroi and finished in Liège. The race was won by Raymond Impanis.

== General classification ==
Final general classification

Rank	Rider	Time
1	Raymond Impanis (BEL)	6h 01' 49"
2	René Privat (FRA)	+ 47"
3	Victor Wartel (BEL)	+ 2' 40"
4	Marcel Janssens (BEL)	+ 2' 40"
5	Jean Bobet (FRA)	+ 2' 40"
6	Nino Defilippis (ITA)	+ 4' 28"
7	Jef Planckaert (BEL)	+ 4' 28"
8	Jacques Dupont (FRA)	+ 6' 44"
9	Gustave Van Vaerenbergh (BEL)	+ 7' 02"
10	Julien Schepens (BEL)	+ 7' 02"
