= 1946 La Flèche Wallonne =

Race details
- Dates: 9 June 1946
- Stages: 1
- Distance: 253 km (157.2 mi)
- Winning time: 6h 58' 48"

Results
	Winner	Désiré Keteleer (BEL)
	Second	René Walschot (BEL)
	Third	Edward Van Dijck (BEL)

The 1946 La Flèche Wallonne was the tenth edition of La Flèche Wallonne cycle race and was held on 9 June 1946. The race started in Mons and finished in Liège. The race was won by Désiré Keteleer.

== General classification ==
Final general classification

Rank	Rider	Time
1	Désiré Keteleer (BEL)	6h 58' 48"
2	René Walschot (BEL)	+ 0"
3	Edward Van Dijck (BEL)	+ 1' 02"
4	Émile Masson (BEL)	+ 1' 02"
5	Petrus Van Verre (BEL)	+ 1' 02"
6	Roger Desmet (BEL)	+ 1' 02"
7	Emiel Faignaert (BEL)	+ 1' 02"
8	Frans Bonduel (BEL)	+ 1' 02"
9	Richard Depoorter (BEL)	+ 3' 29"
10	Jozef Somers (BEL)	+ 3' 29"
