= 1953 Liège–Bastogne–Liège =

Race details
- Dates: 3 May 1953
- Stages: 1
- Distance: 236 km (147 mi)
- Winning time: 6h 53' 51"

Results
	Winner	Alois De Hertog (BEL)
	Second	Maurice Diot (FRA)
	Third	Raoul Rémy (FRA)

The 1953 Liège–Bastogne–Liège was the 39th edition of the Liège–Bastogne–Liège cycle race and was held on 3 May 1953. The race started and finished in Liège. The race was won by Alois De Hertog.

== General classification ==
Final general classification

Rank	Rider	Time
1	Alois De Hertog (BEL)	6h 53' 51"
2	Maurice Diot (FRA)	+ 5' 03"
3	Raoul Rémy (FRA)	+ 5' 03"
4	Jan Storms (BEL)	+ 5' 35"
5	Robert Vanderstockt (BEL)	+ 5' 35"
6	Nino Defilippis (ITA)	+ 6' 54"
7	Jan Zagers (BEL)	+ 6' 54"
8	Briek Schotte (BEL)	+ 6' 54"
9	Jozef Lefevre (BEL)	+ 6' 54"
10	Raymond Impanis (BEL)	+ 6' 54"
