= 1951 Gent–Wevelgem =

Race details
- Dates: 25 March 1951
- Stages: 1
- Distance: 240 km (150 mi)
- Winning time: 6h 31' 00"

Results
	Winner	André Rosseel (BEL)
	Second	Rafael Jonckheere (BEL)
	Third	Lionel Van Brabant (BEL)

The 1951 Gent–Wevelgem was the 13th edition of the Belgian Gent–Wevelgem cycle race and was held on 25 March 1951. The race started in Ghent and finished in Wevelgem. The race was won by André Rosseel.

== General classification ==
Final general classification

Rank	Rider	Time
1	André Rosseel (BEL)	6h 31' 00"
2	Rafael Jonckheere (BEL)	+ 12"
3	Lionel Van Brabant (BEL)	+ 12"
4	Roger Decock (BEL)	+ 12"
5	Alois Vansteenkiste (BEL)	+ 12"
6	Marcel Huber (SUI)	+ 12"
7	Norbert Callens (BEL)	+ 4' 01"
8	Jules Depoorter (BEL)	+ 4' 29"
9	Basiel Wambeke (BEL)	+ 5' 13"
10	André Maelbrancke (BEL)	+ 5' 13"
