= Paris–Nice =

French multi-day road cycling race

- 2026 Paris–Nice

Race details
- Date: March
- Region: France
- Nickname(s): La course au soleil (in French); The Race to the Sun (in English)
- Discipline: Road
- Competition: UCI World Tour
- Type: Major one week stage race
- Organiser: Amaury Sport Organisation
- Race director: Christian Prudhomme
- Web site: www.paris-nice.fr

History
- First edition: 1933
- Editions: 84 (as of 2026)
- First winner: Alphonse Schepers (BEL)
- Most wins: Sean Kelly (IRL) (7 wins)
- Most recent: Jonas Vingegaard (DEN)

Paris–Nice is a professional cycling stage race in France, held annually since 1933. Raced over eight days, the race usually starts with a prologue in the Paris region and ends with a final stage either in Nice or on the Col d'Èze overlooking the city. The event is nicknamed The Race to the Sun, as it runs in the first half of March, typically starting in cold and wintry conditions in the French capital before reaching the spring sunshine on the Côte d'Azur. The hilly course in the last days of the race favours stage racers who often battle for victory.

Paris–Nice is part of the UCI World Tour and is the competition's first stage race in Europe each season, starting one day before its Italian counterpart, the Tirreno-Adriatico/Race of the Two Seas. It is organized by ASO, which also manages most other French World Tour races, most notably the Tour de France and Paris–Roubaix. The roll of honour features some of cycling's greatest riders, including French riders Louison Bobet, Jacques Anquetil and Laurent Jalabert, Low Country riders Eddy Merckx and Joop Zoetemelk who each won the race three times, and Spaniards Miguel Induráin and Alberto Contador. The most successful rider is Ireland's Sean Kelly, who claimed seven consecutive victories in the 1980s.

During the 2003 edition, Kazakh rider Andrey Kivilev died as a result of a head injury sustained in a crash. His death prompted UCI to mandate the use of helmets in all competitions of cycling, except for the last part of a race with an uphill finish. The rule was later changed to require helmets at all times.

== History ==
=== Creation ===
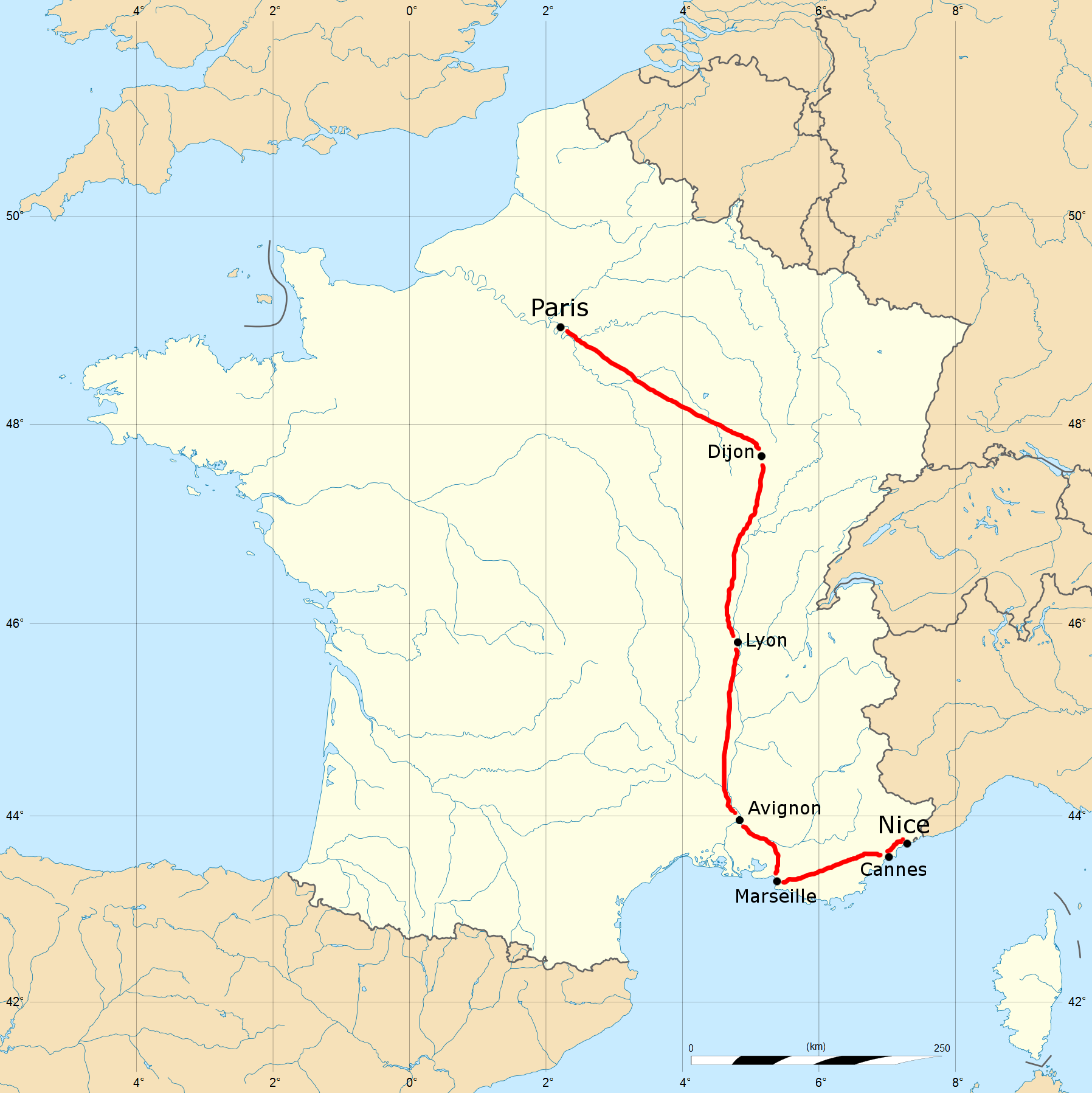
Route of the inaugural edition of Paris–Nice, won by Belgian Alphonse Schepers.

Paris–Nice was created in 1933 by Parisian media mogul Albert Lejeune, in order to promote his Paris-based newspaper Le Petit Journal and Nice-based paper Le Petit Niçois. The race linked the French capital with the fashionable seaside city of Nice on France's Mediterranean coast. It was held in March, at the end of winter, as one of the earliest French bike races on the calendar, immediately following the Six-day racing season on the track.

The first Paris–Nice comprised six stages and was promoted as Les Six Jours de la Route (English: Six Days of the Road). The first stage ran from Paris to Dijon and, with a distance of 312 km, remained the longest stage in the history of Paris–Nice. As most mountain roads were still impassable because of its early calendar date, the route avoided the Alps and primarily followed the lower Rhône Valley, with the only significant climbs on the last day on the outskirts of Nice. The inaugural edition was won by Belgian Alphonse Schepers, who wore the leader's jersey from the first until the last day.

The race was a success and was continued annually until 1939. Other newspapers from Southern France, Lyon Républicain and Marseille-Matin, partnered with Lejeune's titles to sponsor the race. In 1939, Ce Soir and Le Petit Nice were joined by L'Auto. Maurice Archambaud became the first two-fold winner. In 1940, the race was cancelled for the duration of World War II. Race founder Lejeune was sentenced to death and executed after the liberation of France in 1945.

In 1946 Ce Soir again organized the first post-war race, but although the event was a commercial success, the newspaper dropped its sponsorship and the race was discontinued between 1947 and 1950.

=== The Race to the Sun ===
In 1951, the race was revived as Paris-Côte d'Azur by Jean Medecin, the mayor of Nice, who wanted to promote tourism to his fast-growing city and the entire Côte d'Azur. It was organized by weekly magazine Route et Piste. The name Paris–Nice was restored in 1954. The event's status grew in the 1950s from an early-season preparation and training race to an event in its own right, spawning illustrious winners as Louison Bobet and Jacques Anquetil. In 1957 journalist Jean Leulliot, race director since 1951, bought the event with his company Monde Six and became Paris–Nice's new organizer. (Note: Jean Leulliot died in 1982. His daughter Josette succeeded him as head of Monde Six and race organizer.)

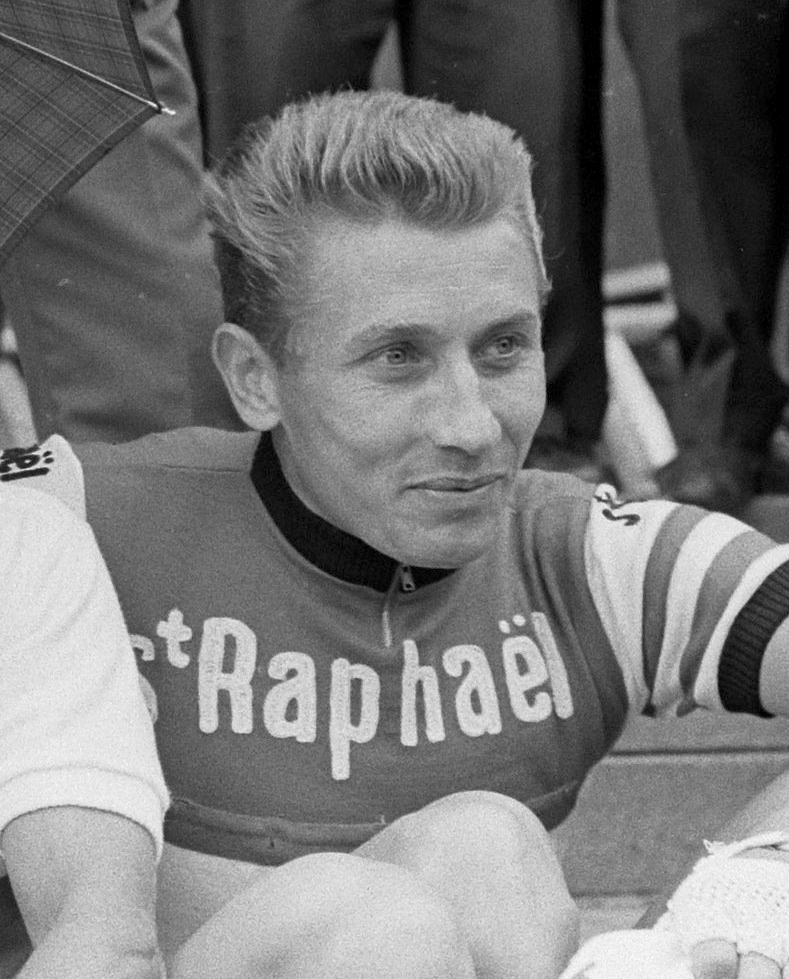
Jacques Anquetil won the race five times, often dueling with Raymond Poulidor.

In 1959 the race was run as Paris–Nice–Rome, with a separate classification from Paris to Nice, a second from Nice to Rome in Italy and a third overall. The excessive length of the race — 1,955 kilometres (1,215 mi) in 11 days — was criticized, and the formula was not repeated. In 1966 Paris–Nice was the scene of a rivalry between French cycling icons Jacques Anquetil and Raymond Poulidor, whose legendary emulation divided French cycling fans for a decade. Anquetil won his fifth and final Paris–Nice, surpassing Poulidor on the final stage to Nice.

In 1969, the final stage was moved from the seaside promenade in Nice to the top of the Col d'Èze hill overlooking the city. Young Eddy Merckx won the final time trial and won his first of three consecutive Paris–Nices. Raymond Poulidor was once again runner-up; Jacques Anquetil completed the stellar podium in his last showdown. In 1972 eternal second Poulidor ended the Cannibal's streak by winning the final time trial and narrowly finishing ahead of Merckx. The next year, he repeated this feat at the age of 37.

In the 1980s, Ireland's all-round specialist Sean Kelly won the race seven consecutive times, from 1981, a winning record to date. The Race to the Sun produced several other foremost winners in the 1990s, notably Spanish Grand Tour specialist Miguel Induráin and Swiss Tony Rominger. French allrounder Laurent Jalabert won the race three consecutive times, the last time in 1997, and is still the last French winner to date. (Note: The official site erroneously states Jalabert as a seven-fold winner.) In 2000, former cyclist Laurent Fignon took over the organisation of the race from the Leulliot family. In 2002, he sold Paris–Nice to ASO.

=== World Tour Race ===
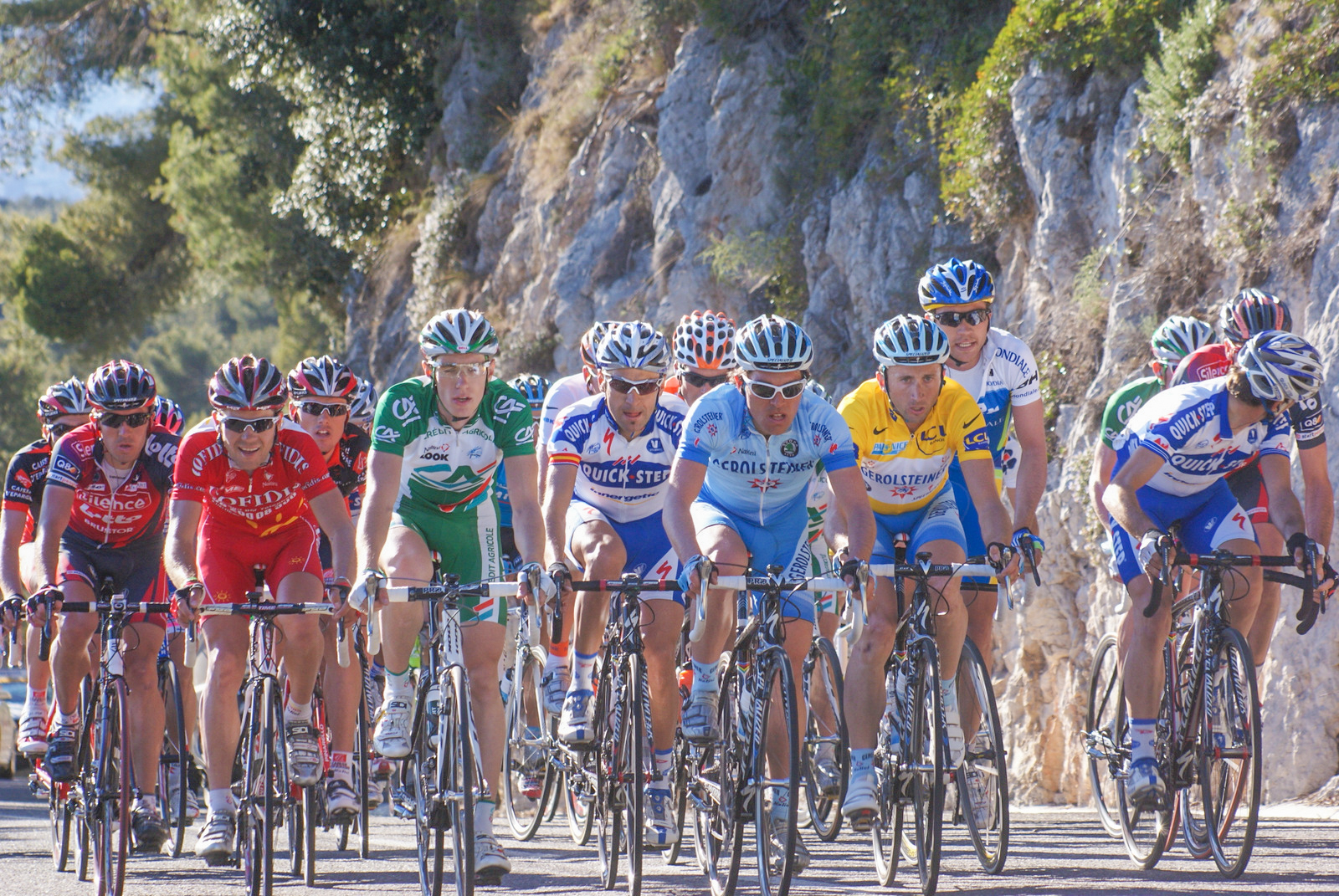
Davide Rebellin in the yellow leader's jersey with the peloton climbing the Col d'Èze in 2008.

The 2003 race was marred by the death of Kazakh rider Andrei Kivilev after a crash on the second stage. Kivilev did not wear a helmet and died that night as a result of brain trauma. The following day the peloton, led by Kivilev's Cofidis team, neutralized the third stage. Racing resumed the next day, and in the fifth stage to the Mont Faron, Kivilev's friend and compatriot Alexander Vinokourov produced a solo victory and crossed the line holding a picture of his late friend.

In 2005 Paris–Nice was included in the inaugural UCI Pro Tour, but was at the center of a dispute between UCI and ASO just before the 2008 edition. On 7 March 2008, two days before the start, UCI president Pat McQuaid announced that all teams starting the race would be suspended by the UCI. That day, the teams' association (AIGCP) decided by a majority-against-minority vote to participate in the race. (Note: Meanwhile, the Court of Arbitration for Sport, to which the ProTour teams referred the case, declared itself unable to judge the legality of any penalties that might be taken against riders or teams.) The issue was eventually resolved and since 2011 Paris–Nice serves as the European opening race of the UCI World Tour.

In 2012 England's Bradley Wiggins won the race, as part of his build-up to the Tour de France. Wiggins was the ninth rider who won the Race to the Sun prior to winning the Tour de France. In the last ten years, Spaniard Alberto Contador and Australian Richie Porte have won the race twice.

The 2020 Paris–Nice was the last international cycling event, as well as the last sporting event in France, before mass gatherings came to a halt due to the COVID-19 pandemic. The race was held with buffer zones to restrict public access and was reduced to seven stages as a response to the worsened situation in the early weeks of March. German Max Schachmann won the overall classification after leading the race since the first stage.

== Route ==
Route of the 2015 Paris–Nice

For many decades, the route of Paris–Nice has developed a traditional and recognizable format. The race starts on Sunday, most often with a prologue time trial near Paris, followed by a series of road stages southwards across France. Due to France's geography, the early stages are usually flat and suited for sprinters, before moving further south towards the Provence region. The latter, southern part of Paris–Nice normally contains several hilly to mountainous stages, which are the decisive portions of the race. The final stage on Sunday is either a road stage finishing on Nice's Promenade des Anglais or an uphill time trial on the Col d'Èze just outside Nice. Known as The Race to the Sun, Paris–Nice is often considered a mini-Tour de France, where riders need to be both competent time-trialists and capable of climbing mountains.

Despite this format, some editions occasionally had more unorthodox courses. The 2014 edition was an unusual race with no time trials or summit finishes. In 2015 organizers returned to the traditional format, starting in Yvelines, west of Paris, before moving south. The key stages were the summit finish to the Col de la Croix de Chaubouret in France's Massif Central on stage 4 and the concluding time trial on Col d'Eze. The 2016 edition included dirt road sectors in the first stage of the race and a passage on the lower slopes of Mont Ventoux in the fifth stage.

=== Starts ===
Until 1962, the race began in the city of Paris. Since 1963, organizers have usually preferred to start in smaller towns and suburbs on the outskirts of Paris or even well outside the French capital. Most editions started in the Paris region of Île-de-France, including nine from Issy-les-Moulineaux and six from Fontenay-sous-Bois. In 1982, the race started with a prologue in Luingne, Belgium; the event's only foreign start. Four other municipalities outside the Île-de-France have hosted the start: Villefranche-sur-Saône in 1988, Châteauroux in 1996, Nevers in 2001 and Amilly in 2008. The last time Paris–Nice started in Paris was in 2000, with a prologue in the Bois de Vincennes.

=== Finishes ===
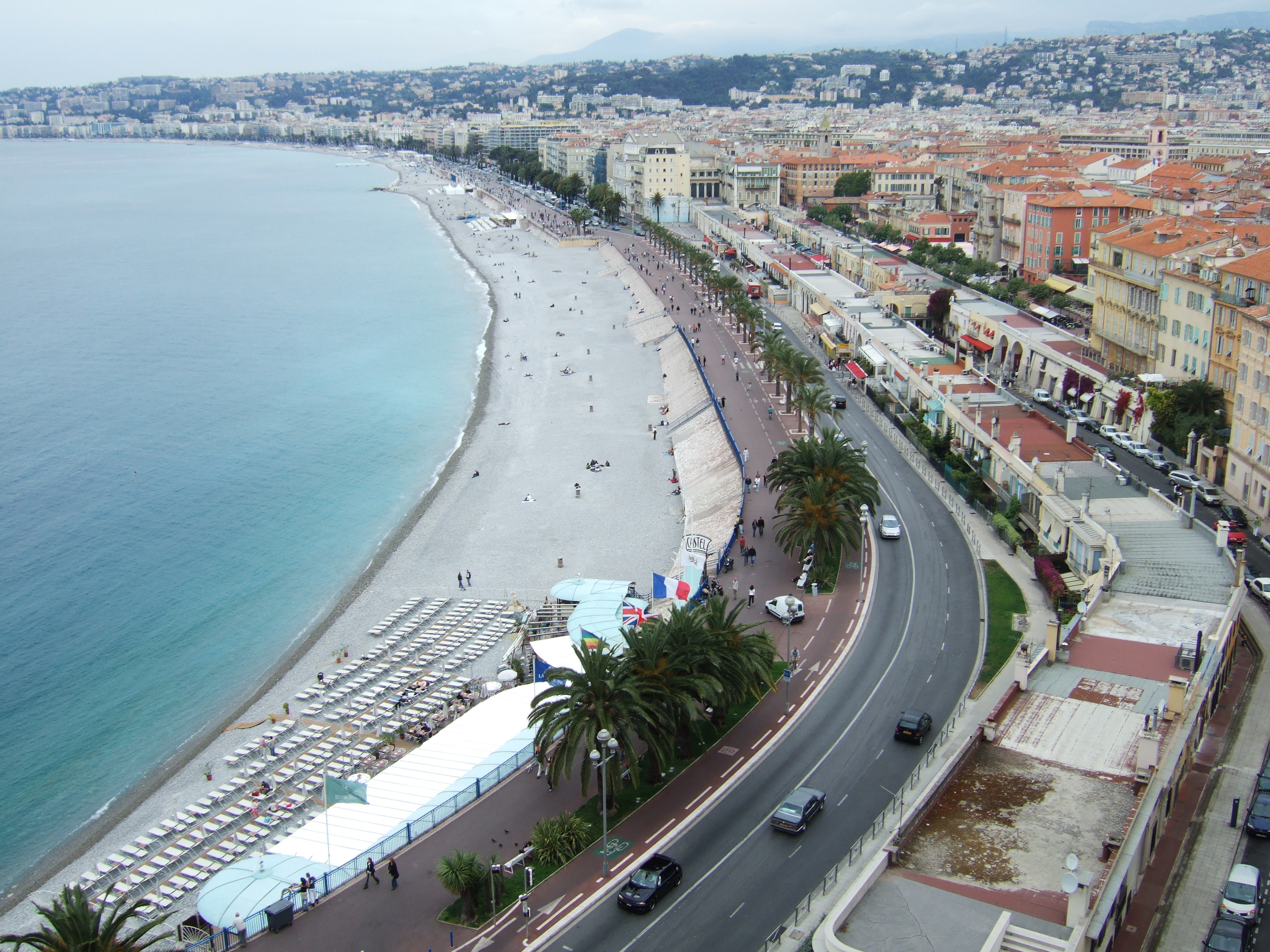
Paris–Nice traditionally finishes on the Promenade des Anglais.

Paris–Nice has always finished in Nice and has only had three different finish locations on its territory. The seven pre-war editions finished on the Quai des États-Unis (Quay of the United States), before moving to the illustrious Promenade des Anglais (Promenade of the English) in 1946. From 1969 to 1995 the race finished with a time trial up the Col d'Èze, except in 1977 when landslides had blocked the road. The Col d'Èze is a 9 km climb, starting from Nice and climbing to 507 m altitude. It is named after the village of Èze, part of the municipality of Nice. Sean Kelly won the Col d'Èze time trial five times in his seven-year dominance.

In 1996, the finish was moved back to the Promenade des Anglais because of the low number of spectators on Col d'Èze and to take advantage of funding from the city of Nice. In 1996 and 1997 the final stage was a flat time trial in the streets of Nice, won by Chris Boardman and Viatcheslav Ekimov respectively. From 1998 to 2011, the final stage was a road race – usually on a hilly terrain with the climbs of the Col d'Èze and La Turbie – starting and ending in Nice. In recent years the race often returns to a final Col d'Èze time trial stage. Bradley Wiggins set a new climbing record in 2012 of 19' 12" on his way to overall victory.

From 1998 to 2011, the concluding stage evolved into a road race on hilly terrain, incorporating climbs like the Col d'Èze and La Turbie, starting and ending in Nice. The Col d'Èze time trial made a notable return in 2012, where Bradley Wiggins set a new climbing record of 19 minutes and 12 seconds, propelling him to overall victory.

In recent editions, the Col d'Èze has continued to feature prominently. For instance, in the 2025 Paris–Nice, Matteo Jorgenson delivered a remarkable performance by dropping all competitors on the Col d'Èze while wearing the yellow jersey, solidifying his overall win.

The Col d'Èze remains a challenging ascent, symbolizing the climactic battles that define the "Race to the Sun."

== Jersey colours ==
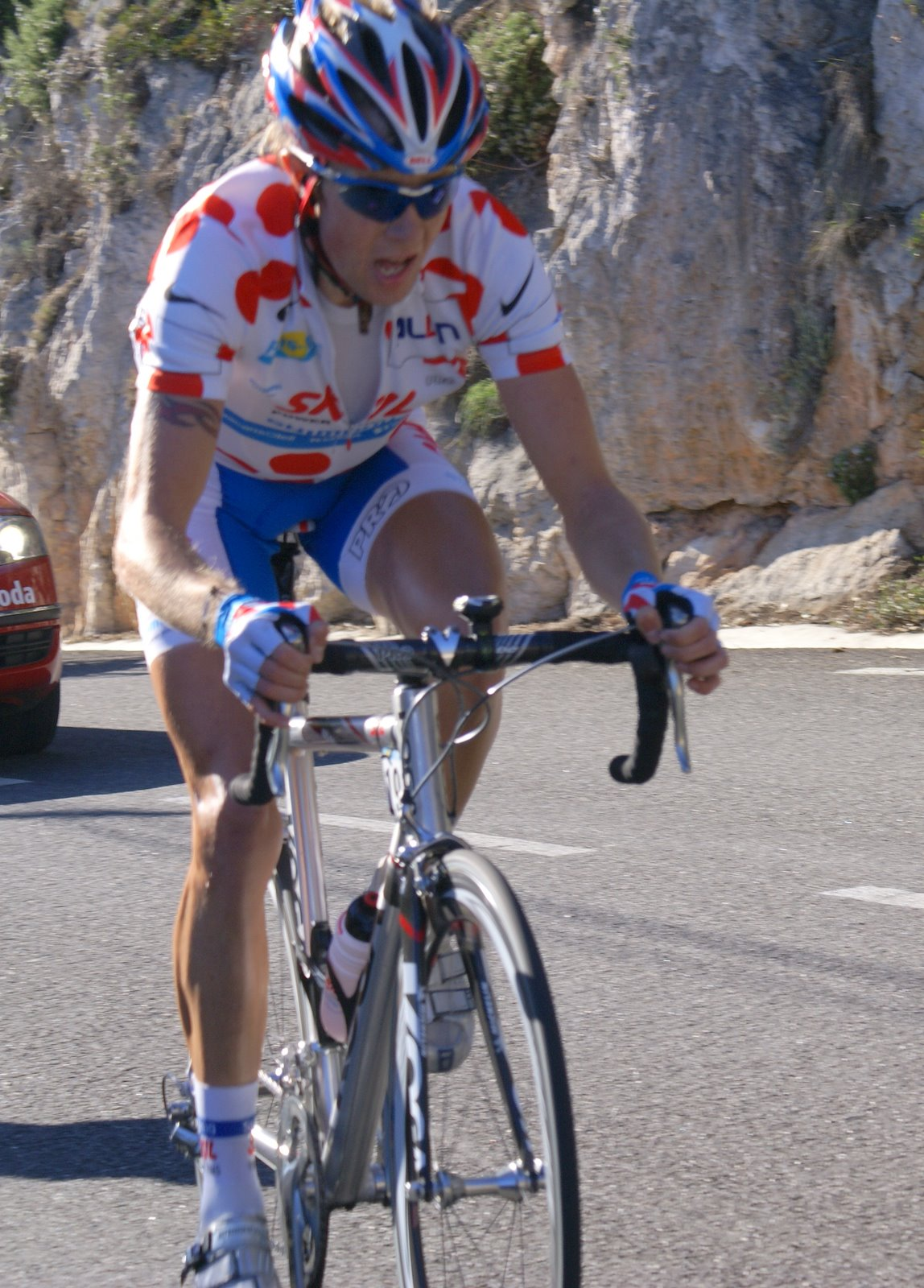
Clément Lhotellerie, polka dot jersey in the 2008 race.

Since 2008, the overall leader has worn a yellow jersey. At the creation of the race in 1933, the leader's jersey was blue and gold, evoking the Mediterranean sunny sky. In 1946, the leader's jersey was green. In 1951, the organization opted for a yellow jersey with orange piping; before changing to all-white from 1955 to 2001. In 2002, after the race was obtained by ASO, the leader's jersey was yellow and white, before changing it to yellow in 2008, reflecting the Tour de France leader's jersey. In 2018, the yellow jersey features a white bar (same style as the Critérium du Dauphiné yellow jersey).

The points classification leader's jersey has been green since 2008. It was green from 1954 to 1984, and there was no points classification from 1985 to 1996. The points jersey was pink and purple in 2000 and 2001, and green and white from 2002 to 2007.

The King of the Mountains jersey has white with red polka dots, as in the Tour de France, since the race's takeover by ASO. The classification was introduced in 1952 and the jersey colour changed several times. In the 1970s it was yellow and red; later, it was white and purple. In 1984, the jersey became yellow and blue (the colors of sponsor Crédit Lyonnais); the following year, it was blue. Agrigel became its sponsor in 1990, and changed the colors to yellow and blue.

The best young rider's jersey was introduced in 2002, when it was blue and white. It has been white since 2007.

== Winners ==
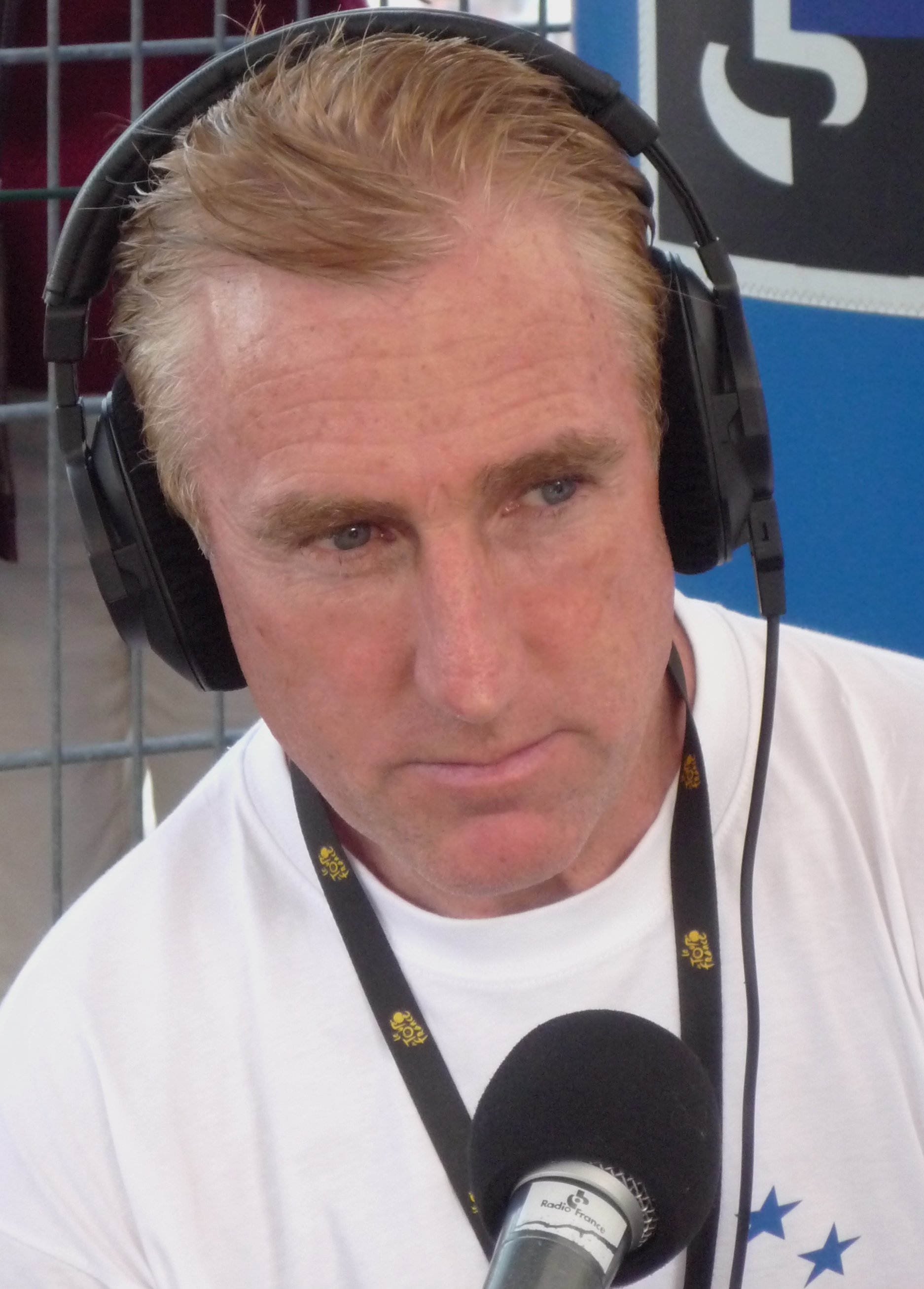
Sean Kelly (pictured in 2009) won Paris–Nice seven consecutive times from 1982 to 1988.

Year	Country	Rider	Team
1933	Belgium	Alphonse Schepers	La Française
1934	Belgium	Gaston Rebry	Alycon
1935	France	René Vietto	Helyett–Hutchinson
1936	France	Maurice Archambaud	Mercier–Hutchinson
1937	France	Roger Lapébie	Mercier–Hutchinson
1938	Belgium	Jules Lowie	Pélissier-Mercier–Hutchinson
1939	France	Maurice Archambaud	Mercier–Hutchinson
1946	Italy	Fermo Camellini	Olmo
1951	Belgium	Roger Decock	Bertin
1952	France	Louison Bobet	Stella-Huret
1953	France	Jean-Pierre Munch	Arliguie–Hutchinson
1954	Belgium	Raymond Impanis	Mercier–BP–Hutchinson
1955	France	Jean Bobet	L. Bobet–BP–Hutchinson
1956	Belgium	Fred De Bruyne	Mercier–BP–Hutchinson
1957	France	Jacques Anquetil	Helyett
1958	Belgium	Fred De Bruyne	Carpano
1959	France	Jean Graczyck	Helyett
1960	Belgium	Raymond Impanis	Faema
1961	France	Jacques Anquetil	Helyett–Fynsec
1962	Belgium	Joseph Planckaert	Flandria–Faema
1963	France	Jacques Anquetil	St.Raphael–Gitane
1964	Netherlands	Jan Janssen	Pelforth–Sauvage
1965	France	Jacques Anquetil	Ford–Gitane
1966	France	Jacques Anquetil	Ford–Hutchinson
1967	Great Britain	Tom Simpson	Peugeot–BP–Michelin
1968	West Germany	Rolf Wolfshohl	Bic
1969	Belgium	Eddy Merckx	Faema
1970	Belgium	Eddy Merckx	Faemino
1971	Belgium	Eddy Merckx	Molteni
1972	France	Raymond Poulidor	Gan–Mercier–Hutchinson
1973	France	Raymond Poulidor	Gan–Mercier–Hutchinson
1974	Netherlands	Joop Zoetemelk	Gan–Mercier–Hutchinson
1975	Netherlands	Joop Zoetemelk	Gan–Mercier–Hutchinson
1976	France	Michel Laurent	Miko–de Gribaldy
1977	Belgium	Freddy Maertens	Flandria–Faema
1978	Netherlands	Gerrie Knetemann	TI–Raleigh–McGregor
1979	Netherlands	Joop Zoetemelk	Miko–Mercier
1980	France	Gilbert Duclos-Lassalle	Peugeot–Esso–Michelin
1981	Ireland	Stephen Roche	Peugeot–Esso–Michelin
1982	Ireland	Sean Kelly	Sem–France Loire
1983	Ireland	Sean Kelly	Sem–France Loire
1984	Ireland	Sean Kelly	Skil–Sem–Reydel
1985	Ireland	Sean Kelly	Skil–Sem–Reydel
1986	Ireland	Sean Kelly	Kas–Mavic
1987	Ireland	Sean Kelly	Kas
1988	Ireland	Sean Kelly	Kas–Mavic
1989	Spain	Miguel Induráin	Reynolds
1990	Spain	Miguel Induráin	Banesto
1991	Switzerland	Tony Rominger	Toshiba
1992	France	Jean-François Bernard	Banesto
1993	Switzerland	Alex Zülle	ONCE
1994	Switzerland	Tony Rominger	Mapei–CLAS
1995	France	Laurent Jalabert	ONCE
1996	France	Laurent Jalabert	ONCE
1997	France	Laurent Jalabert	ONCE
1998	Belgium	Frank Vandenbroucke	Mapei–Bricobi
1999	Netherlands	Michael Boogerd	Rabobank
2000	Germany	Andreas Klöden	Team Telekom
2001	Italy	Dario Frigo	Fassa Bortolo
2002	Kazakhstan	Alexandre Vinokourov	Team Telekom
2003	Kazakhstan	Alexandre Vinokourov	Team Telekom
2004	Germany	Jörg Jaksche	Team CSC
2005	United States	Bobby Julich	Team CSC
2006	United States	Floyd Landis	Phonak
2007	Spain	Alberto Contador	Discovery Channel
2008	Italy	Davide Rebellin	Gerolsteiner
2009	Spain	Luis León Sánchez	Caisse d'Epargne
2010	Spain	Alberto Contador	Astana
2011	Germany	Tony Martin	HTC–Highroad
2012	Great Britain	Bradley Wiggins	Team Sky
2013	Australia	Richie Porte	Team Sky
2014	Colombia	Carlos Betancur	Ag2r–La Mondiale
2015	Australia	Richie Porte	Team Sky
2016	Great Britain	Geraint Thomas	Team Sky
2017	Colombia	Sergio Henao	Team Sky
2018	Spain	Marc Soler	Movistar Team
2019	Colombia	Egan Bernal	Team Sky
2020	Germany	Maximilian Schachmann	Bora–Hansgrohe
2021	Germany	Maximilian Schachmann	Bora–Hansgrohe
2022	Slovenia	Primož Roglič	Team Jumbo–Visma
2023	Slovenia	Tadej Pogačar	UAE Team Emirates
2024	United States	Matteo Jorgenson	Visma–Lease a Bike
2025	United States	Matteo Jorgenson	Visma–Lease a Bike
2026	Denmark	Jonas Vingegaard	Visma–Lease a Bike

=== Multiple winners ===
Riders in italics are active.

Wins	Rider	Editions
7	(Republic of Ireland) Seán Kelly	1982, 1983, 1984, 1985, 1986, 1987, 1988
5	(France) Jacques Anquetil	1957, 1961, 1963, 1965, 1966
3	(Belgium) Eddy Merckx	1969, 1970, 1971
3	(Netherlands) Joop Zoetemelk	1974, 1975, 1979
3	(France) Laurent Jalabert	1995, 1996, 1997
2	(France) Maurice Archambaud	1936, 1939
2	(Belgium) Raymond Impanis	1954, 1960
2	(Belgium) Fred De Bruyne	1956, 1958
2	(France) Raymond Poulidor	1972, 1973
2	(Spain) Miguel Induráin	1989, 1990
2	(Switzerland) Tony Rominger	1991, 1994
2	(Kazakhstan) Alexander Vinokourov	2002, 2003
2	(Spain) Alberto Contador	2007, 2010
2	(Australia) Richie Porte	2013, 2015
2	(Germany) Maximilian Schachmann	2020, 2021
2	(United States) Matteo Jorgenson	2024, 2025

=== Wins per country ===
Wins	Country
21	France
14	Belgium
8	Ireland
6	Germany (including West Germany); Netherlands; Spain
4	United States
3	Colombia; Great Britain; Italy; Switzerland
2	Australia; Kazakhstan; Slovenia
1	Denmark

== Trivia ==
- The youngest winner of Paris–Nice was René Vietto in 1935, at the age of 21.
- The oldest winner was Raymond Poulidor in 1973, at the age of 37.
- France holds the record of most wins per nation, but no Frenchman has been victorious since Laurent Jalabert in 1997.
- Thirteen winners on the roll of honour have also won the Tour de France in their careers: Louison Bobet, Jacques Anquetil, Jan Janssen, Eddy Merckx, Joop Zoetemelk, Stephen Roche, Miguel Induráin, Alberto Contador, Bradley Wiggins, Geraint Thomas, Egan Bernal, Tadej Pogačar, and Jonas Vingegaard. All bar Pogacar and Vingegaard won their first or only Paris–Nice before they had won the Tour de France.
