= 1952 La Flèche Wallonne =

Race details
- Dates: 10 May 1952
- Stages: 1
- Distance: 220 km (136.7 mi)
- Winning time: 5h 59' 59"

Results
	Winner	Ferdinand Kübler (SUI)
	Second	Stan Ockers (BEL)
	Third	Raymond Impanis (BEL)

The 1952 La Flèche Wallonne was the 16th edition of La Flèche Wallonne cycle race and was held on 10 May 1952. The race started in Charleroi and finished in Liège. The race was won by Ferdinand Kübler.

== General classification ==
Final general classification

Rank	Rider	Time
1	Ferdinand Kübler (SUI)	5h 59' 59"
2	Stan Ockers (BEL)	+ 0"
3	Raymond Impanis (BEL)	+ 0"
4	Jan Storms (BEL)	+ 0"
5	Raymond Impanis (BEL)	+ 0"
6	Gottfried Weilenmann (SUI)	+ 0"
7	Roger Decock (BEL)	+ 0"
8	Robert Varnajo (FRA)	+ 10"
9	Désiré Keteleer (BEL)	+ 46"
10	Jean Robic (FRA)	+ 1' 48"
