= 1939 Paris–Nice =

Race details
- Dates: 16–19 March 1939
- Stages: 4
- Distance: 903 km (561.1 mi)
- Winning time: 23h 26' 48"

Results
	Winner	Maurice Archambaud (FRA)
	Second	Frans Bonduel (BEL)
	Third	Gérard Desmet (BEL)

The 1939 Paris–Nice was the seventh edition of the Paris–Nice cycle race and was held from 16 March to 19 March 1939. The race started in Paris and finished in Nice. The race was won by Maurice Archambaud.

== General classification ==
Final general classification

Rank	Rider	Time
1	Maurice Archambaud (FRA)	23h 26' 48"
2	Frans Bonduel (BEL)	+ 9' 33"
3	Gérard Desmet (BEL)	+ 9' 33"
4	Theo Pirmez (BEL)	+ 16' 47"
5	Émile Masson (BEL)	+ 18' 05"
6	Fermo Camellini (ITA)	+ 18' 16"
7	Piet van Nek (NED)	+ 20' 39"
8	Guy Lapébie (FRA)	+ 29' 17"
9	Fabien Galateau (FRA)	+ 29' 21"
10	Albert Rosseel (BEL)	+ 33' 46"
