= Jozef Schils =

Belgian cyclist

- Schils in 1961

Personal information
- Born: 4 September 1931 Kersbeek-Miskom, Belgium
- Died: 3 March 2007 (aged 75) Liège, Belgium

Cycling career
- Sport: Cycling
- Discipline: Road
- Role: Rider

Amateur team
- 1951: Garin–Wolber

Professional teams
- 1951–1953: Garin–Wolber
- 1953: Bianchi–Pirelli
- 1954: Touring–Pirelli
- 1955: Girardengo
- 1956–1959: Faema
- 1960–1962: Mercier–BP–Hutchinson
- 1963: Wiel's–Groene Leeuw
- 1964: Dr. Mann
- 1965: Lamot–Libertas

Major wins
- Stage races Paris–Tours (1953) One-day races and Classics National Road Race Championships (1952) Nationale Sluitingsprijs (1953) Nokere Koerse (1955) Brussels–Ingooigem (1956) Schaal Sels (1956) Grand Prix d'Isbergues (1960) Flèche Hesbignonne (1960, 1962)

Jozef "Jef" Schils (4 September 1931, in Kersbeek-Miskom – 3 March 2007, in Liège) was a Belgian cyclist.

In 1952, at the age of 21, Jozef Schils, who had just become a professional racing cyclist and was still in the army, became Belgian road racing champion. He was nominated for the road world championships in Luxembourg in the same year and finished tenth.

Schils rode as a professional until 1965 and won around 40 Belgian criteria during this time. 1953 was his most successful year, in which he won Paris-Tours and the Nationale Sluitingsprijs. In 1955 he won at Nokere Koerse. His nickname was "little Coppi", because Fausto Coppi had praised him. However, he turned down offers to go to Italy. In 1957, he won the Omloop der Vlaamse Gewesten in Ichtegem on a postman's bike. In 1960, he switched to the French team "Mercier", which was led by Antonin Magne and in which Raymond Poulidor rode. At the end of the season he had a hard crash and he crashed again heavily in 1961. In 1965, he ended his career.

Then Jozef Schils opened a café in Koekelberg, later a laundry and a bicycle shop. Jozef Schils was the father of the former professional racing cyclist Patrick Schils and was the grandfather of Dominic Schils, also a racing cyclist of note.

== Major results ==
1951
4th Coppa Bernocchi
1952
1st Belgian Road Champion Road race
1st Stage 3a Tour de Romandie
1953
1st Belgian Road Champion Interclubs road race
1st Paris–Tours
1st Nationale Sluitingsprijs
1st Grote Prijs Beeckman-De Caluwé
1st Vilvoorde–Houtem
1st Grand Prix of Walloon Brabant
1st Grand Prix of Haspengouw
1954
1st Tour of Hesbaye
1st De Drie Zustersteden
1st Brussels–Bost
1st Brussels–Couvin
1st Grand Prix of Brabant Wallon
1st Trophée des Trois Pays
1st Ronde van Haspengouw
3rd Grote Prijs Beeckman-De Caluwé
4th Paris–Brussels
4th Omloop van Limburg
4th Omloop der Vlaamse Gewesten
1955
1st Nokere Koerse
1st GP Stad Vilvoorde
1st Grote Prijs Berlare
1st Hoeilaart-Diest-Hoeilaart
1st GP Benego
5th Flèche Halloise
8th Liège–Bastogne–Liège
8th Paris–Tours
1956
1st Brussels–Ingooigem
1st Schelde–Dender–Leie
1st Schaal Sels
1st Sint-Lievens-Esse
2nd Overall Tour de l'Ouest
3rd Heistse Pijl
1957
1st GP Benego
1st Omloop der Vlaamse Gewesten
1st Flèche Halloise
1st Brussels–Bost
2nd Omloop Mandel-Leie-Schelde
2nd Brussels–Ingooigem
2nd Grote Prijs Berlare
3rd Coppa Bernocchi
3rd Etoile du Leon
4th Overall Tour of Belgium
5th Tour de Wallonie
8th Omloop Het Volk
9th Gent–Wevelgem
1958
1st Trofee Luc Van Biesen
1st Vilvoorde–Houtem
1st Stage 5 Tour of the Netherlands
1st Stage 3 (TTT) Tour du Levant
1st Stage 3 Driedaagse van Antwerpen
1st Antwerp–Genk
1st Stage 3 (TTT) & 8 Volta a la Comunitat Valenciana
2nd GP Flandria
2nd Milano–Mantova
2nd Nationale Sluitingsprijs
2nd De Drie Zustersteden
3rd Heistse Pijl
3rd Overall GP Marvan

1st Stage 1

4th Overall Tour of Lombardy
5th Scheldeprijs
5th Brussels–Ingooigem
6th Belgian Road Champion Road race
1959
1st Circuit des 3 Provinces
1st Stages 1b and 5 Tour du Levant
1st Stage 2 & 6 Volta a la Comunitat Valenciana
5th Tour de Wallonie
6th Overall Tour of Belgium
8th Paris–Brussels
1960
1st Grand Prix of Isbergues
1st Stage 4 Tour du Nord
1st Dokter Tistaertprijs Zottegem
1st GP de la Basse-Sambre
1st GP Brabant Wallon
1st Flèche Hesbignonne-Cras Avernas
1st Stages 2 and 4b Tour of Belgium
1st Circuit of Basse-Sambre
2nd Heistse Pijl
2nd Schaal Sels
2nd Schelde–Dender–Leie
2nd Paris–Valenciennes
3rd GP Flandria
5th Brussels–Ingooigem
8th Tour de Wallonie
1961
1st Hoegaarden–Antwerp–Hoegaarden
1st Sint-Lievens-Esse
1962
1st Flèche Hesbignonne-Cras Avernas
1st Dokter Tistaertprijs Zottegem
3rd Druivenkoers Overijse
3rd Schelde–Dender–Leie
3rd Trofee Luc Van Biesen
4th Omloop van de Vlasstreek
5th Dwars door West-Vlaanderen
8th Tour de Wallonie
10th La Flèche Wallonne
1963
1st Trofee Luc Van Biesen
4th Schelde–Dender–Leie
5th Scheldeprijs
5th Brussels–Ingooigem
5th GP Stad Vilvoorde
1964
2nd Grand Prix Pino Cerami
2nd Omloop van het Houtland
4th De Kustpijl
