= 1954 Tour of Flanders =

38th Tour of Flanders
Race details
- Dates: 4 April 1954
- Stages: 1
- Distance: 255 km (158.4 mi)
- Winning time: 7h 33'

Results
	Winner	Raymond Impanis (BEL)	(Mercier–Hutchinson)
	Second	François Mahé (FRA)	(Bertin–d'Alessandro)
	Third	Alfons Van den Brande (BEL)	(Libertas)

The 38th running of the Tour of Flanders cycling classic was held on Sunday, 4 April 1954. Belgian Raymond Impanis won the race in a two-man sprint with French rider François Mahé. 38 of 230 riders finished.

== Route ==
The race started in Ghent and finished in Wetteren – totaling 255 km. The course featured five categorized climbs:

- Kluisberg
- Kwaremont
- Kruisberg
- Edelareberg
- Kloosterstraat (Geraardsbergen)

== Results ==
Result
Rank	Rider	Team	Time
1	Raymond Impanis (BEL)	Mercier–Hutchinson	7h 33' 00"
2	François Mahé (FRA)	Bertin–d'Alessandro	+ 1"
3	Alfons Van den Brande (BEL)	Libertas	+ 33"
4	Marcel Rijckaert (BEL)	Mercier–Hutchinson	s.t.
5	Marcel De Mulder (BEL)	Terrot–Hutchinson	s.t.
6	Marcel Hendrickx (BEL)	Arbos–Bubba	+ 45"
7	André Rosseel (BEL)	Terrot–Hutchinson	s.t.
8	Valère Ollivier (BEL)	Bertin–d'Alessandro	s.t.
9	Roger Decock (BEL)	Bertin–d'Alessandro	s.t.
10	Alfredo Martini (ITA)	Atala	s.t.
