= 1947 Tour de Romandie =

Race details
- Dates: 15–18 May 1947
- Stages: 4
- Distance: 771 km (479 mi)
- Winning time: 20h 55' 27"

Results
	Winner	Désiré Keteleer (BEL)
	Second	Gino Bartali (ITA)
	Third	Ferdinand Kübler (SUI)

The 1947 Tour de Romandie was the inaugural edition of the Tour de Romandie cycle race and was held from 15 May to 18 May 1947. The race started and finished in Geneva. The race was won by Désiré Keteleer.

== General classification ==
Final general classification
Rank	Rider	Time
1	Désiré Keteleer (BEL)	20h 55' 27"
2	Gino Bartali (ITA)	+ 1' 41"
3	Ferdinand Kübler (SUI)	+ 2' 51"
4	Walter Diggelmann (SUI)	+ 3' 10"
5	Hans Schütz (SUI)	+ 3' 29"
6	Renzo Zanazzi (ITA)	+ 3' 35"
7	Prosper Depredomme (ITA)	+ 3' 54"
8	Gottfried Weilenmann (SUI)	+ 5' 34"
9	Jean Goldschmit (LUX)	+ 6' 22"
10	Pierre Brambilla (ITA)	+ 6' 32"
