= Roger Decock =

Belgian cyclist (1927–2020)

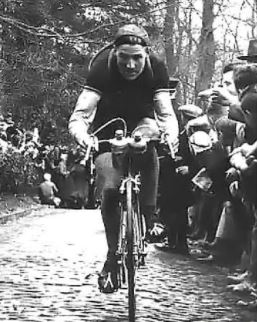

Personal information
- Full name: Roger Decock
- Born: 20 April 1927 Izegem, Belgium
- Died: 30 May 2020 (aged 93) Aarsele, Belgium

Cycling career
- Sport: Cycling
- Discipline: Road
- Role: Rider

Professional teams
- 1946: Metropole–Dunlop
- 1949: Arliguie–Hutchinson
- 1949: Bury
- 1950: Alcyon–Dunlop
- 1951–1954: Bertin–Wolber
- 1954: Sercu–Thompson
- 1955: Van Hauwaert–Maes–Pils
- 1956–1958: Faema–Guerra
- 1959: Flandria–Dr.Mann
- 1960: Dr. Mann–Dossche Sport
- 1961: Wiel's–Flandria

Major wins
- Paris–Nice (1951); Tour of Flanders (1952)

Roger Decock (20 April 1927 – 30 May 2020) was a Belgian professional road bicycle racer.

Decock won Paris–Nice in 1951. During the 1951 Tour de France he was having the best Tour of his career and was 5th place overall when he became the only witness to one of the most infamous moments in cycling history. Wim Van Est was defending the Yellow Jersey; he was descending the Col d'Aubisque when he lost control of his bike and went off a cliff. Decock was the only person to witness this and he stopped to get help for the fallen rider. It took several minutes to locate Van Est and over two hours to rescue him from 200 feet down the mountain. In total, Decock waited 25 minutes until it was clear the situation was in hand, but the time he waited cost him his high place and he ultimately finished the Tour in 17th.

The following year he had the biggest victory of his career when he won the 1952 Tour of Flanders. As the finish line approached, Decock, Loretto Petrucci and Briek Schotte, one of the best riders of his generation, were the three lead riders fighting for the win and he defeated them in the sprint. Wim Van Est finished 4th.

== Major results ==
1948
1st Ronde van Vlaanderen Beloften
2nd Kattekoers
1949
2nd Kampioenschap van Vlaanderen
1950
1st Vijfbergenomloop
2nd Grand Prix Jules Lowie
4th Kuurne–Brussels–Kuurne
9th Gent-Wevelgem
9th Paris-Brussels
1951
1st Overall Paris-Nice
1st Kampioenschap van Vlaanderen
1st Ronde van West-Vlaanderen
4th Gent-Wevelgem
9th Grand Prix des Nations
1952
1st Tour of Flanders
2nd Brussel-Ingooigem
2nd GP de Suisse
4th Overall Dwars door België
5th Vijfbergenomloop
6th Liège-Bastogne-Liège
7th La Flèche Wallonne
1953
1st Stage 11 Tour du Maroc
5th Roubaix–Huy
6th Paris-Roubaix
6th GP de Suisse
9th Gent-Wevelgem
9th Overall Paris-Nice
1954
Tour of Belgium

1st Stages 3, 4a (ITT) & 5

1st Scheldeprijs
2nd Road race, National Road Championships
2nd Brussel-Ingooigem
2nd Roubaix–Huy
2nd Grand Prix Jules Lowie
2nd Circuit des XI Villes
7th Liège-Bastogne-Liège
7th Paris-Tours
8th La Flèche Wallonne
8th Paris-Brussels
9th Tour of Flanders
10th Paris-Roubaix
1955
1st Brussel-Ingooigem
4th Paris-Brussels
6th Ronde van Brabant
7th Tour of Flanders
1956
4th Omloop Het Volk
6th Giro di Lombardia
6th Tre Valli Varesine
8th Nationale Sluitingsprijs
1957
1st Nationale Sluitingsprijs
1st Stage 1 Ronde van Nederland
9th Paris-Brussels
1958
10th Milan-San Remo
1959
1st Omloop van Oost-Vlaanderen
7th GP Flandria
1960
5th Kampioenschap van Vlaanderen
