= 1953 Paris–Tours =

Race details
- Dates: 4 October 1953
- Stages: 1
- Distance: 253 km (157.2 mi)
- Winning time: 6h 07' 37"

Results
	Winner	Jozef Schils (BEL)
	Second	Ferdinand Kübler (SUI)
	Third	Georges Gilles (FRA)

The 1953 Paris–Tours was the 47th edition of the Paris–Tours cycle race and was held on 4 October 1953. The race started in Paris and finished in Tours. The race was won by Jozef Schils.

== General classification ==
Final general classification

Rank	Rider	Time
1	Jozef Schils (BEL)	6h 07' 37"
2	Ferdinand Kübler (SUI)	+ 12"
3	Georges Gilles (FRA)	+ 12"
4	Amand Audaire (FRA)	+ 12"
5	André Mahé (FRA)	+ 12"
6	Jan de Valck (BEL)	+ 12"
7	Rik Van Looy (BEL)	+ 12"
8	Pierre Molinéris (FRA)	+ 12"
9	André Rosseel (BEL)	+ 12"
10	Jacques Dupont (FRA)	+ 12"
