= 1951 Paris–Nice =

Race details
- Dates: 13–17 March 1951
- Stages: 4
- Distance: 1,174 km (729.5 mi)
- Winning time: 34h 27' 29"

Results
Jersey awarded to the overall winner	Winner	Roger Decock (BEL)
	Second	Lucien Teisseire (FRA)
	Third	Kléber Piot (FRA)

The 1951 Paris–Nice was the ninth edition of the Paris–Nice cycle race and was held from 13 March to 17 March 1951. The race started in Paris and finished in Nice. The race was won by Roger Decock.

== General classification ==
Final general classification

Rank	Rider	Time
1	Roger Decock (BEL)	34h 27' 29"
2	Lucien Teisseire (FRA)	+ 12"
3	Kléber Piot (FRA)	+ 1' 30"
4	Albert Dubuisson (BEL)	+ 2' 00"
5	Pierre Barbotin (FRA)	+ 4' 03"
6	Jean Malléjac (FRA)	+ 4' 09"
7	Louison Bobet (FRA)	+ 9' 39"
8	François Mahé (FRA)	+ 12' 04"
9	Raphaël Géminiani (FRA)	+ 12' 39"
10	Adolphe Deledda (FRA)	+ 13' 30"
