= 1954 Paris–Nice =

Race details
- Dates: 10–14 March 1954
- Stages: 5
- Distance: 1,053.5 km (654.6 mi)
- Winning time: 30h 49' 05"

Results
Jersey awarded to the overall winner	Winner	Raymond Impanis (BEL)	(Mercier)
	Second	Nello Lauredi (FRA)	
	Third	Francis Anastasi (FRA)	
Jersey awarded to the mountains classification winner	Mountains	Raymond Impanis (BEL)	(Mercier)

The 1954 Paris–Nice was the 12th edition of the Paris–Nice cycle race and was held from 10 March to 14 March 1954. The race started in Paris and finished in Nice. The race was won by Raymond Impanis.

== General classification ==
Final general classification

Rank	Rider	Time
1	Raymond Impanis (BEL)	30h 49' 05"
2	Nello Lauredi (FRA)	+ 1' 02"
3	Francis Anastasi (FRA)	+ 1' 37"
4	Riccardo Filippi (ITA)	+ 3' 01"
5	Hilaire Couvreur (BEL)	+ 4' 26"
6	Georges Meunier (FRA)	+ 5' 32"
7	Jacques Anquetil (FRA)	+ 7' 26"
8	Jacques Renaud (FRA)	+ 7' 34"
9	Maurice Blomme (BEL)	+ 7' 41"
10	Antonin Rolland (FRA)	+ 7' 57"
