= 1954 La Flèche Wallonne =

Race details
- Dates: 8 May 1954
- Stages: 1
- Distance: 220 km (136.7 mi)
- Winning time: 6h 35' 48"

Results
	Winner	Germain Derycke (BEL)
	Second	Ferdinand Kübler (SUI)
	Third	Jan De Valck (BEL)

The 1954 La Flèche Wallonne was the 18th edition of La Flèche Wallonne cycle race and was held on 8 May 1954. The race started in Charleroi and finished in Liège. The race was won by Germain Derycke.

== General classification ==
Final general classification

Rank	Rider	Time
1	Germain Derycke (BEL)	6h 35' 48"
2	Ferdinand Kübler (SUI)	+ 0"
3	Jan De Valck (BEL)	+ 0"
4	Martin Van Geneugden (BEL)	+ 0"
5	Marcel Ernzer (LUX)	+ 0"
6	Jan Storms (BEL)	+ 0"
7	Raymond Impanis (BEL)	+ 0"
8	Roger Decock (BEL)	+ 0"
9	Edward Peeters (BEL)	+ 0"
10	André Rosseel (BEL)	+ 0"
