= 1952 Tour of Flanders =

36th Tour of Flanders
- Event poster

Race details
- Dates: 6 April 1952
- Stages: 1
- Distance: 258 km (160.3 mi)
- Winning time: 7h 27'

Results
	Winner	Roger Decock (BEL)	(Bertin–d'Alessandro)
	Second	Loretto Petrucci (ITA)	(Bianchi–Pirelli)
	Third	Briek Schotte (BEL)	(Alcyon–Dunlop)

The 36th running of the Tour of Flanders cycling classic was held on Sunday, 6 April 1952. Belgian Roger Decock won the race in a three-man sprint before Loretto Petrucci and Briek Schotte. 43 of 210 riders finished.

== Route ==
The race started in Ghent and finished in Wetteren – totaling 258 km. The course featured four categorized climbs:

- Kwaremont
- Kruisberg
- Edelareberg
- Muur van Geraardsbergen

== Results ==
Result
Rank	Rider	Team	Time
1	Roger Decock (BEL)	Bertin–d'Alessandro	7h 27' 00"
2	Loretto Petrucci (ITA)	Bianchi–Pirelli	s.t.
3	Briek Schotte (BEL)	Alcyon–Dunlop	s.t.
4	Wim van Est (NED)	Garin–Wolber	+ 15"
5	Attilio Redolfi (FRA)	Mercier–Leducq	+ 23"
6	Louison Bobet (FRA)	Stella–Huret–Dunlop	+ 1' 17"
7	Désiré Keteleer (BEL)	Garin–Wolber	+ 1' 53"
8	Valère Ollivier (BEL)	Bertin–d'Alessandro	+ 2' 17"
9	Jacques Dupont (FRA)	Dilecta–Wolber	+ 2' 25"
10	Lode Anthonis (BEL)	Terrot–Hutchinson	+ 11' 04"
