= Jean-Pierre Munch =

French cyclist

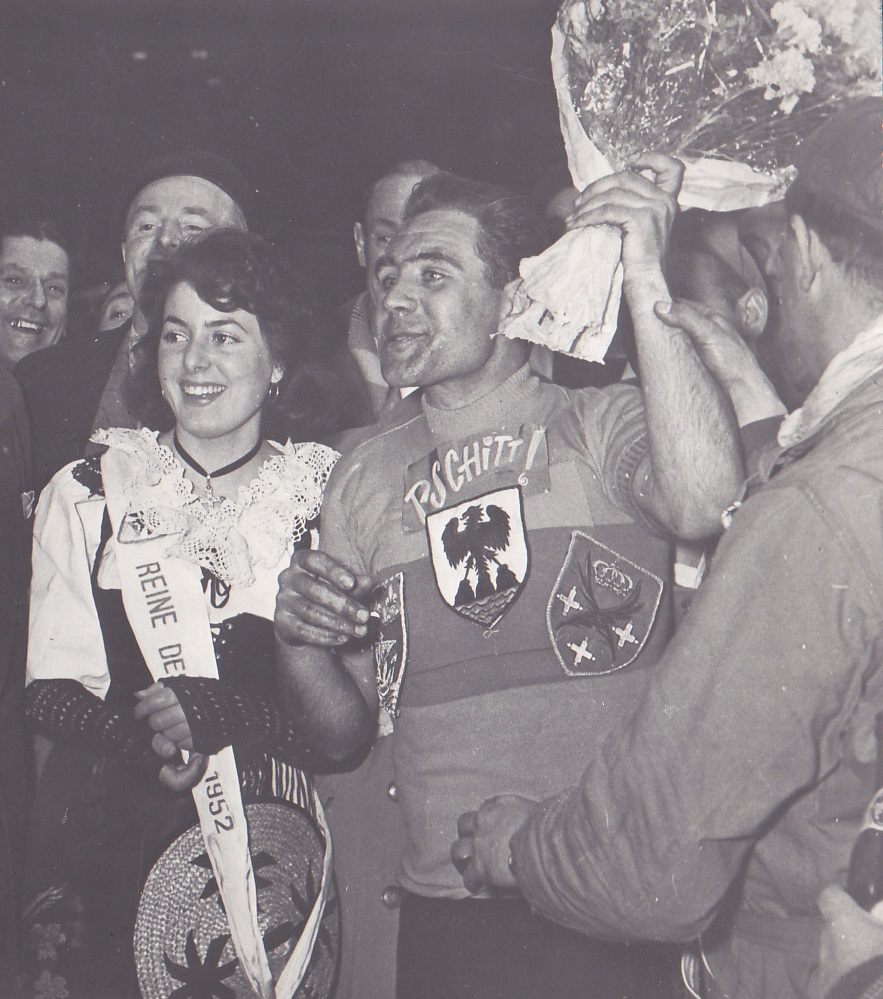
- image of Jean-Pierre Munch, was a French cyclist celebrating with people

Personal information
- Full name: Jean-Pierre Munch
- Born: 12 June 1926 Strasbourg, France
- Died: 17 October 1996 (aged 70) Strasbourg, France

Cycling career
- Sport: Cycling
- Discipline: Road
- Role: Rider

Professional teams
- 1951: La Perle-Hutchinson
- 1952–1955: Arliguie-Hutchinson

Major wins
- Paris–Nice (1953)

Jean-Pierre Munch (12 June 1926 – 17 October 1996) was a French road bicycle racer from Strasbourg who won the Paris–Nice in 1953.
