= Alois Vansteenkiste =

Belgian cyclist

- Vansteenkiste in 1953

Personal information
- Full name: Alois Vansteenkiste
- Born: 7 May 1928 Heule, Belgium
- Died: 27 September 1991 (aged 63) Kortrijk, Belgium

Cycling career
- Sport: Cycling
- Role: Rider

Professional teams
- 1950–1953: Mercier–Hutchinson
- 1954: Mercier–BP–Hutchinson
- 1955: Bertin–D'Alessandro–The Dura

Major wins
- One-day races and Classics National Road Race Championships (1953)

Alois Vansteenkiste (7 May 1928 – 27 September 1991) was a Belgian racing cyclist. He won the Belgian national road race title in 1953. He also rode in the 1951 Tour de France.

== Major results ==
1949
2nd Kattekoers
1950
1st Stage 4 Tour of Belgium Independents
3rd Liège–Charleroi–Liège
1951
5th Gent–Wevelgem
6th Overall Tour de Luxembourg

1st Stage 2

8th Overall Critérium du Dauphiné Libéré

1st Stage 3

1952
1st Stage 1 Tour de Lorraine
7th Gent–Wevelgem
8th Kuurne–Brussels–Kuurne
1953
1st National Road Championships Road race
3rd Schelde–Dender–Leie
