= Raymond Impanis =

Belgian cyclist (1925–2010)

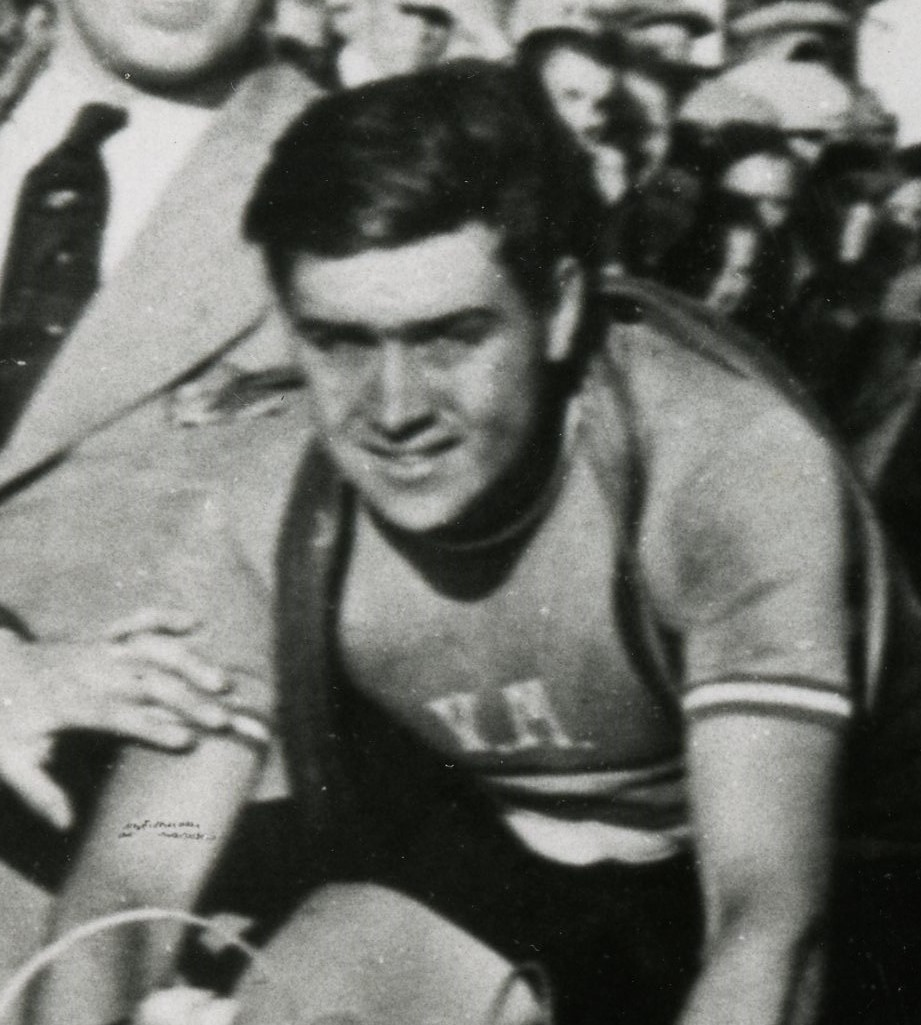
- Impanis in 1949

Personal information
- Born: 19 October 1925
- Died: 31 December 2010 (aged 85)

Cycling career
- Sport: Cycling
- Discipline: Road
- Role: Rider

Professional teams
- 1947–1951: Alcyon–Dunlop
- 1952–1953: Garin–Wolber
- 1954: Mercier–Hutchinson
- 1955–1959: Elvé–Peugeot
- 1960–1962: Faema
- 1963: Peugeot–BP

Major wins
- Grand Tours Tour de France 3 individual stages (1947, 1948) Other stage races Paris–Nice (1954, 1960) One-day races and Classics Tour of Flanders (1954) Paris–Roubaix (1954) La Flèche Wallonne (1957) Gent–Wevelgem (1952, 1953)

Raymond Impanis (19 October 1925 – 31 December 2010) was a Belgian professional cyclist from 1947 to 1963. He won Paris–Roubaix, the Tour of Flanders, Gent–Wevelgem and three stages in Tour de France.

== Career ==
Impanis became a professional rider on 2 October 1946 in the Alcyon team. In 1947, he came second in Liège-Bastogne-Liège and fourth in Paris-Roubaix. In July, he took part in his first Tour de France with the Belgian team. He won the longest time trial stage in the history of the Tour, between Vannes and Saint-Brieuc, nearly five minutes ahead of second-placed Jean Robic. He finished sixth in the general classification. The following year, he won two more stages in the Tour, finishing tenth. He won Gent-Wevelgem in 1952 and 1953.

In 1954, Raymond Impanis joined the Mercier team led by Antonin Magne. He had his best year there. In March, he won Paris-Nice, after taking the lead in the general classification during the second stage, which he won in Saint-Étienne. At the beginning of April, he won the Tour of Flanders. The following week, he added Paris-Roubaix to his list of victories. Present in a group of 22 riders at the front of the race, he attacked with 1,500 m to go and crossed the finish line with a hundred meters advantage on the second rider, Stan Ockers. Ferdi Kübler, fourth, says after the finish: "Impanis? It's a plane. There was nothing we could do against him, he flew away... ".

Raymond Impanis finished third in the 1956 Tour of Spain and won the Flèche Wallonne in 1957. In 1960, he won Paris-Nice for the second time. His last season was in 1963. That year he rode his sixteenth Paris-Roubaix. This record was equalled in 2010 by Dutchman Servais Knaven and in 2011 by American George Hincapie and Frenchman Frédéric Guesdon, before the latter two brought the record for the most appearances in the Hell of the North to seventeen in 2012.

Impanis died on 31 December 2010, aged 85, following a long illness.

== Honours ==
From 1982, the race GP Raymond Impanis is organized in his honour. He was made an honorary citizen of Kampenhout in 1999. In 2012, a bust of him was erected in Berg, his birthplace.

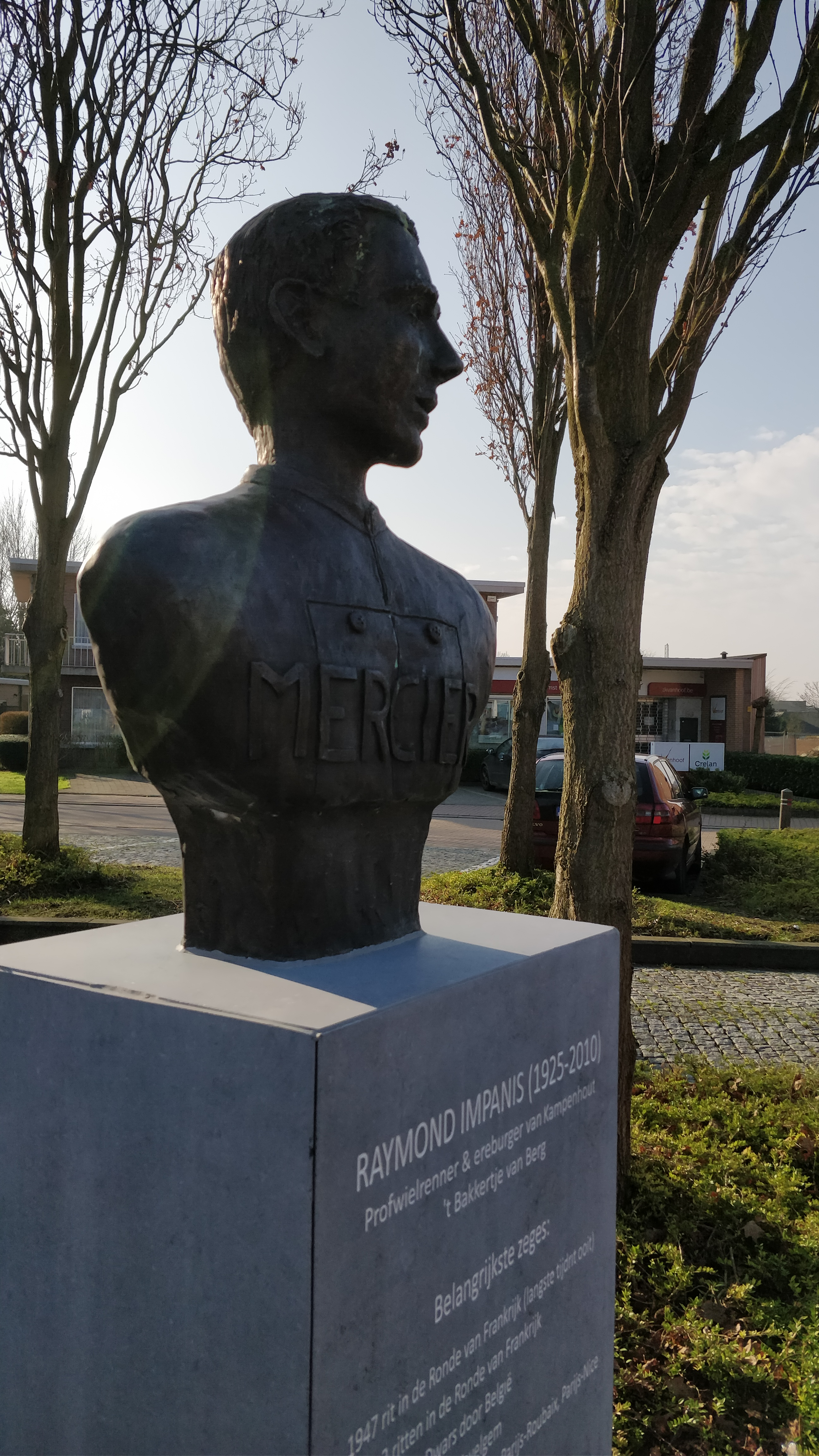
Bust of Raymond Impanis in Berg, Kampenhout

== Major results ==
=== Amateur ===
1946
1st Overall Tour of Belgium Independents

1st Stages 3, 5 and 6

1st Omloop der Vlaamse Gewesten Independents
1st Overall Tour of Limburg

1st Stage 5

1st Liège-Charleroi-Liège
2nd GP Stad Vilvoorde
3rd Belgian National Road Race Championships Independents
3rd Bruxelles-Liège

=== Professional ===
1947
6th Overall Tour de France

1st Stage 19

1st Stage 5 Tour of Belgium
1st Overall Berg—Housse—Berg
1st Overall Omnium de la Route
2nd Liège-Bastogne-Liège
4th Paris-Roubaix

1948
10th Overall Tour de France:

1st Stages 9 and 10

1st Kampenhout—Charleroi—Kampenhout
1st Omloop der Vlaamse Ardennen Ichtegem
2nd Liège-Bastogne-Liège
4th Tour of Flanders
10th UCI World Championships Road race

1949
2nd Overall Tour of Belgium

1st Stage 3

1st Dwars door Vlaanderen
1st Berg—Housse—Berg
2nd Belgian National Road Race Championships
2nd Liège-Saint-Hubert
3rd GP Stad Vilvoorde
5th Tour of Flanders

1950
1st Weekend ardennais
1st Stage 5 Tour of Belgium
1st Berg—Housse—Berg
1st Steenokkerzeel
2nd La Flèche Wallonne
2nd Omloop der Vlaamse Gewesten
Tour de France

8th Overall classification

9th Milan-San Remo

1951
1st Overall Dwars door Vlaanderen

1st Stage 1

3rd Overall Deutschland Tour

1st Stage 3

1st Kortenberg
2nd GP Stad Vilvoorde
3rd Omloop Het Volk
3rd Hoeilaart-Diest-Hoeilaart
5th Milan-San Remo
6th Paris–Roubaix
7th Tour of Flanders
9th Challenge Desgrange-Colombo
10th La Flèche Wallonne

1952
1st Gent–Wevelgem
1st Tour de Hesbaye
1st Ronde van Haspengouw
2nd Omloop Het Volk
3rd Overall Paris–Nice

1st Stage 3b

3rd La Flèche Wallonne
3rd Grand Prix de Belgique
3rd Weekend ardennais
3rd Overall Tour de Romandie
3rd Overall Deutschland Tour
5th Grand Prix des Nations
6th Paris-Brussels
9th Challenge Desgrange-Colombo

1953
1st Gent–Wevelgem
2nd Overall Tour d'Algérie
5th La Flèche Wallonne
5th Overall Tour of Belgium
6th Milan-San Remo
9th Challenge Desgrange-Colombo
10th Liège-Bastogne-Liège

1954
1st Paris–Roubaix
1st Tour of Flanders
1st Overall Paris–Nice

1st Stage 2

2nd Liège-Bastogne-Liège
2nd Challenge Desgrange-Colombo
2nd Weekend ardennais
7th La Flèche Wallonne

1955
1st Boortmeerbeek
1st Hanret
1st Huy
1st La Hulpe
2nd Liège-Bastogne-Liège
3rd Gent–Wevelgem
4th Overall Tour de Luxembourg
5th Paris-Roubaix
7th Challenge Desgrange-Colombo

1956
1st Namur
3rd Overall Vuelta a España
2nd Driedaagse van Antwerpen
7th Omloop Het Volk
8th Gent–Wevelgem

1957
1st La Flèche Wallonne
1st GP Stan Ockers
1st Jadotville
1st Knokke
2nd Paris-Brussels
2nd Challenge Desgrange-Colombo
3rd Tour de Picardie
3rd Weekend ardennais
4th Tour de Wallonie
5th Giro di Lombardia
6th Paris–Roubaix
7th Overall Giro d'Italia
9th Trofeo Baracchi

1958
1st Braine-le-Comte
2nd Weekend ardennais
3rd Vijfbergenomloop
4th Tour de Romandie
5th Liège-Bastogne-Liège
6th La Flèche Wallonne
9th Paris–Roubaix
10th Milan-San Remo

1959
1st Londerzeel
3rd Halse Pijl
4rd Paris–Roubaix
9th Trofeo Baracchi

1960
1st Overall Paris–Nice

1st Stage 2 (TTT)

3rd Giro di Sardegna
3rd Grand Prix de la Famenne
4th Paris-Brussels
6th Trofeo Fenaroli
8th Tour of Flanders
10th Paris–Roubaix

1961
1st Stage 4 Tour of Belgium (with Rik Van Looy and Louis Proost)
2nd Gent–Wevelgem
3rd Ronde van Limburg
3rd Antwerp-Wevelgem
3rd Cologne-Aachen-Cologne
4th Paris–Tours
4th Overall Deutschland Tour

1st Stage 2

1962
3rd Brabantse Pijl
6th Tour de Romandie
9th Paris–Roubaix

=== Track cycling ===
1955
2nd Belgian middle-distance track championship
1956
2nd Belgian middle-distance track championship
1957
2nd Belgian middle-distance track championship
1958
2nd Belgian middle-distance track championship
1959
3rd Belgian middle-distance track championship
1960
2nd Six Days of Madrid (with Edgard Sorgeloos)
1962
3rd Belgian middle-distance track championship
1963
3rd Belgian middle-distance track championship
