= Alfons Van den Brande =

Belgian cyclist

Personal information
- Born: 15 February 1928 Kessel, Belgium
- Died: 23 April 2016 (aged 88) Lier, Belgium

Cycling career
- Sport: Cycling
- Role: Rider

Alfons Van den Brande (15 February 1928 – 23 April 2016) was a Belgian professional racing cyclist. He rode in the 1954 Tour de France and finished third in the 1954 Tour of Flanders.
