= Marcel Ernzer =

Luxembourgish cyclist (1926–2003)

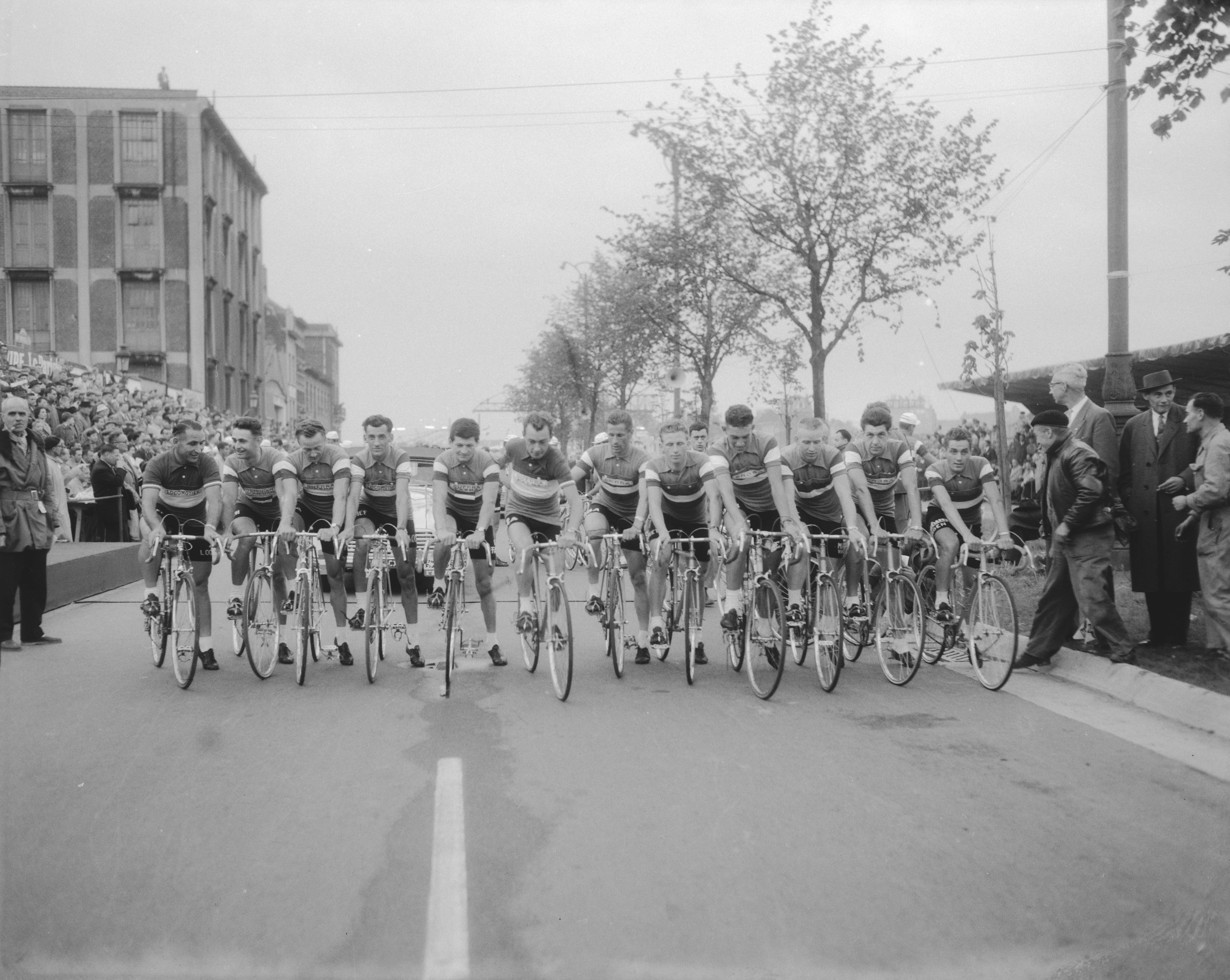

Personal information
- Born: 23 March 1926 Esch-sur-Alzette, Luxembourg
- Died: 1 April 2003 (aged 77) Luxembourg City, Luxembourg

Cycling career
- Sport: Cycling

Marcel Ernzer (23 March 1926 – 1 April 2003) was a Luxembourgish cyclist. He competed in the individual and team road race events at the 1948 Summer Olympics.

== Major results ==
1949
3rd Overall Tour de Luxembourg
9th Overall Tour de Suisse
1950
2nd Chanteloup-les-Vignes
8th Overall Tour de Luxembourg
1951
1st Overall Tour de Luxembourg

1st Stage 3a

1st Overall Circuit des Six Provinces
1953
1st Road race, National Road Championships
6th Overall Tour de Luxembourg
6th GP du Midi-Libre
10th Road race, UCI Road World Championships
1954
1st Road race, National Road Championships
1st Liège-Bastogne-Liège
1st Weekend Ardennais
3rd Overall Tour de Luxembourg

1st Stage 2a

5th La Flèche Wallonne
1955
1st Road race, National Road Championships
1st Stage 7 Tour de Suisse
2nd Overall Tour of Belgium

1st Stage 2

2nd Overall Tour de Picardie
2nd Overall Tour de Luxembourg
7th Liège-Bastogne-Liège
1956
4th Overall Tour de Luxembourg
1957
7th Overall Tour de Luxembourg
10th Road race, UCI Road World Championships
1958
1st Stage 4 Tour de Luxembourg
7th Liège-Bastogne-Liège
1959
4th Liège-Bastogne-Liège
1960
1st Overall Tour de Luxembourg

1st Stage 3

1961
2nd Overall Tour de Luxembourg

1st Stage 4
