= Jan Storms =

Belgian cyclist (1925–2019)

Personal information
- Born: 20 December 1925 Tremelo, Belgium
- Died: 2 September 2019 (aged 93) Tremelo, Belgium

Cycling career
- Sport: Cycling
- Discipline: Road
- Role: Rider

Jan Storms (20 December 1925 – 2 September 2019) was a Belgian racing cyclist. He rode in the 1950 Tour de France.

After retiring, De Wolf remained in the cycling world; he was a coach of various cyclists, in particular we remember his successes obtained with Eddy Merckx, of whom he was coach from 1970 until the end of his career.

== Major results ==
1949
2nd GP Stad Zottegem
1950
3rd La Flèche Wallonne
1952
3rd Roubaix–Huy
4th La Flèche Wallonne
4th Overall Tour du Nord
6th Omloop Het Volk
7th Overall Tour de Luxembourg
8th Schaal Sels
1953
1st Bruxelles–Bost
4th Liège–Bastogne–Liège
6th La Flèche Wallonne
7th Gent–Wevelgem
7th Paris–Brussels
1954
3rd Ronde van Brabant
6th La Flèche Wallonne
1955
1st Omloop van de Fruitstreek
2nd GP Stad Vilvoorde
3rd Road race, National Road Championships
9th Paris–Brussels
9th Ronde van Limburg
1956
4th Scheldeprijs
1957
2nd GP Victor Standaert
1960
4th GP Stad Vilvoorde
1962
9th Druivenkoers-Overijse
10th Ronde van Limburg
