= Maurice Blomme =

Belgian cyclist

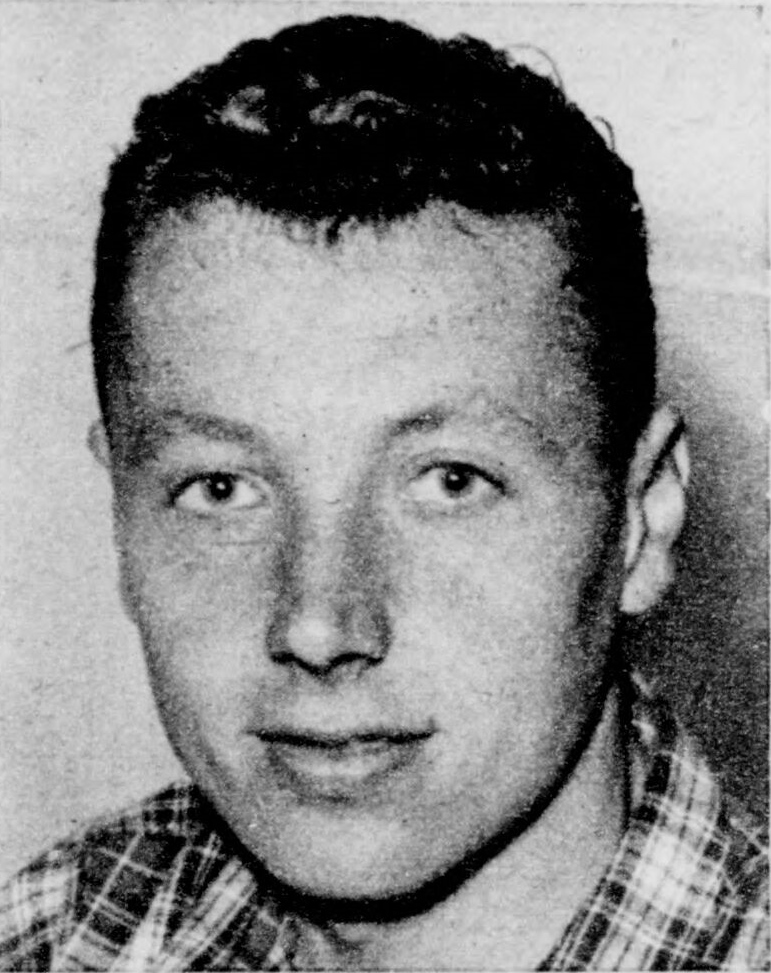

Personal information
- Full name: Maurice Blomme
- Born: 29 October 1926 Oostnieuwkerke, Belgium
- Died: 11 April 1980 (aged 53) Roeselare, Belgium

Cycling career
- Sport: Cycling
- Discipline: Road
- Role: Rider

Major wins
- Grand Tours Tour de France 1 individual stage (1950 One-day races and Classics Championship of Flanders (1950) Grand Prix des Nations (1950) Dwars door West-Vlaanderen (1954)

Maurice Blomme (29 October 1926 – 11 April 1980) was a Belgian professional road bicycle racer. He competed in the team pursuit event at the 1948 Summer Olympics. In 1950, Blomme was the winner of the 12th stage of the 1950 Tour de France.

== Major results ==
1946
3rd Belgian National Road Race Championships Juniors
1947
1st Military road race champion
3rd Gent–Wevelgem U23
1949
1st GP Stad Zottegem
1st Championship of West-Flanders
1st Stage 1, 9 & 13 Tour du Maroc
1st Aaigem
1st Stadem
1st Ooigem
2nd GP de l'Equipe
3rd Grand Prix des Nations
3rd GP Dr. Eugeen Roggeman
4th Omloop Het Volk
1950
1st Championship of Flanders
1st GP Stad Zottegem
1st Omloop der drie Provinciën
1st Grand Prix des Nations
Tour de France:

1st Stage 12

1st Omloop van het Houtland
1st Roeselare
1st Wingene
1st Ronde van West-Vlaanderen
1st Handzame
1st Vilvoorde- Houtem
3rd Schaal Sels
6th Overall Tour of Belgium
1951
1st Ardooie
1st Brussels-Ingooigem
1st Vilvoorde- Houtem
1st Sint-Andries
1st GP Stad Zottegem
1st Hooglede
1st Boezinge
1st Komen
1st Kortrijk
1st Wingene
2nd Nokere Koerse
2nd Schaal Sels
2nd Kuurne-Brussel-Kuurne
5th Paris–Tours
5th Grand Prix des Nations
1952
1st Berlare (nl)
1st Hooglede
1st Kruishoutem
1st Soignies
1st Zingem
1st Eke
2nd Gent–Wevelgem
2nd Grand Prix des Nations
3rd Overall Tour du Maroc
6th GP Roeselare
7th Kuurne-Brussel-Kuurne
8th Overall Tour of Belgium
1953
1st Stage 6 Tour de Luxembourg
1st Houthulst
1st Stene
4th Overall Paris-Nice
4th National Championships Road race
5th Grand Prix des Nations
10th Paris-Roubaix
1954
1st Omloop Mandel-Leie-Schelde
1st GP Stad Vilvoorde
1st Driedaagse van West-Vlaanderen
1st Omloop van het Houtland
1st Lessines
2nd Circuit of the West (fr)
5th Elfstedenronde
9th Gent–Wevelgem
9th overall Paris-Nice
9th GP Roeselare
1955
1st Douai
1st Le Bizet
1st Oostende
1st Circuit of the West (fr)
1st Kachtem
1st Aarschot
3rd Brussels-Ingooigem
5th Scheldeprijs
9th Dwars door Vlaanderen
10th GP Roeselare
1956
1st Oostrozebeke
1st Soignies
5th National Championships Road race
1957
1st Tielt
7th National Championships Road race
1959
3rd Leiedal Koerse (nl)
