= Désiré Keteleer =

Belgian cyclist

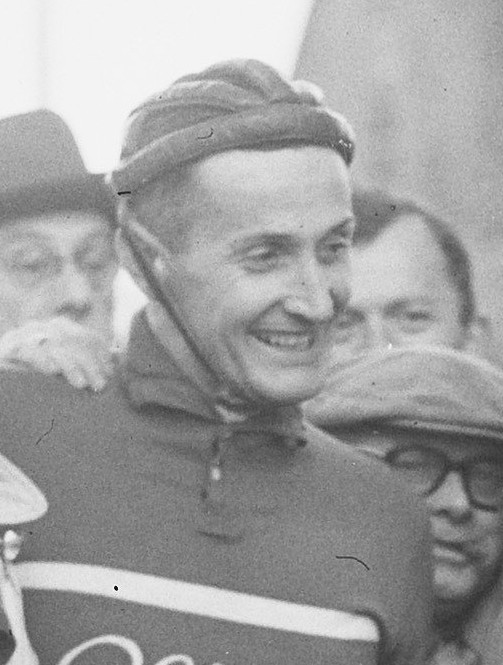

Personal information
- Full name: Désiré Keteleer
- Nickname: Dis
- Born: 13 June 1920 Belgium
- Died: 17 September 1970 (aged 50)

Cycling career
- Sport: Cycling
- Discipline: Road
- Role: Rider

Major wins
- Tour of Romandie (1947); La Flèche Wallonne (1946); 2 stages Giro d'Italia (1948, 1952); 1 stage Tour de France (1949)

Désiré "Dis" Keteleer (13 June 1920 – 17 September 1970) was a Belgian professional road bicycle racer. Keteleer was born in Anderlecht and was professional from 1942 until 1961, winning the inaugural Tour of Romandie in 1947 and La Flèche Wallonne in 1946. He rode in the 1949 Tour de France, winning stage 15. Keteleer died in Rebecq-Rognon.

== Major results ==
1943
3rd La Flèche Wallonne
1945
3rd Overall Tour of Belgium

1st Stages 3 & 5

3rd Nokere Koerse
10th Omloop Het Volk
1946
1st Brussels–Spa
1st La Flèche Wallonne
7th Overall Tour of Belgium

1st Stage 5

8th Overall Tour de Luxembourg
1947
1st Elfstedenronde
1st Kampenhout–Charleroi–Kampenhout
1st Scheldt–Dender–Lys
1st Overall Tour de Romandie

1st Stages 1B & 2

1st Stages 6 & 7 Tour de Suisse
1948
1st Circuit des régions frontalières
1st Roubaix–Huy
1st Stage 11 Giro d'Italia
1949
1st Stage 15 Tour de France
2nd Overall Tour of the Netherlands
8th Omloop Het Volk
1950
1st Stages 5, 8, 13 & 17 Deutschland Tour
1st Stage 2 Tour de Romandie
1st Stage 3 Volta a Catalunya
3rd Züri-Metzgete
1952
1st Stage 4 Giro d'Italia
1st Stage 1 Tour de Suisse
5th Overall Paris–Nice
6th 1952 Paris–Roubaix
7th Tour of Flanders
9th La Flèche Wallonne
1953
2nd Tour of Flanders
5th Gent–Wevelgem
8th 1953 Paris–Roubaix
1955
2nd Gent–Wevelgem
3rd Ronde van Limburg
1956
3rd Gent–Wevelgem
6th Liège–Bastogne–Liège
1957
2nd Overall Paris–Nice

1st Stage 1

8th Paris–Bruxelles
10th Tour of Flanders
1958
2nd Overall Giro di Sardegna
3rd Grand Prix d'Antibes
5th Overall Tour de Suisse

1st Stage 5

10th Milan–San Remo
