= 1956 Tour de France, Stage 1 to Stage 11 =

Cycling race stages

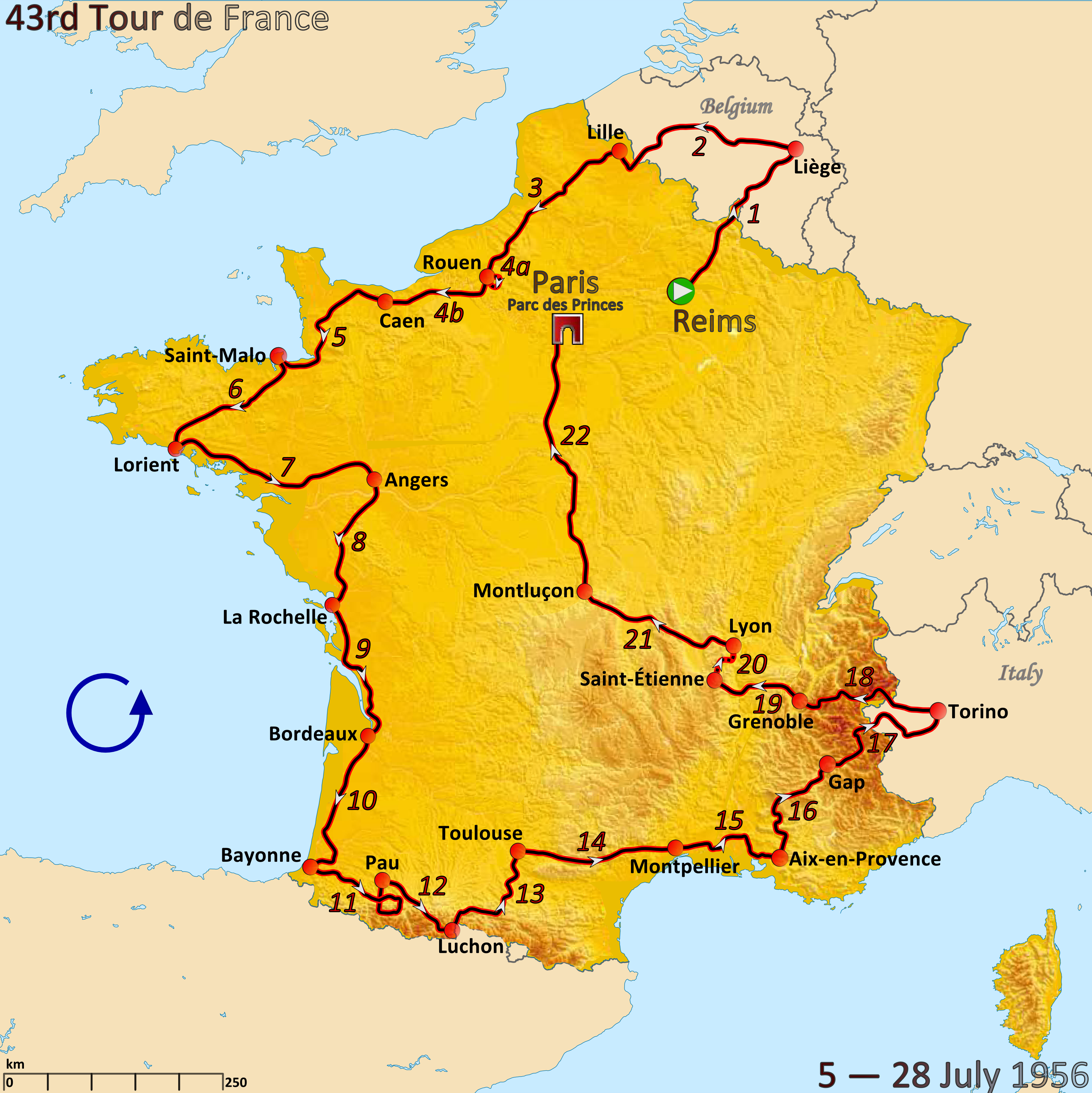
Route of the 1956 Tour de France

The 1956 Tour de France was the 43rd edition of Tour de France, one of cycling's Grand Tours. The Tour began in Reims with a flat stage on 5 July and Stage 11 occurred on 16 July with a mountainous stage to Pau. The race finished in Paris on 28 July.

== Stage 1 ==
1 July 1956 - Reims to Liège, 223 km (138.6 mi)

Stage 1 result

Rank	Rider	Team	Time
1	André Darrigade (FRA)	France	5h 19' 15"
2	Fritz Schär (SUI)	Switzerland	s.t.
3	Brian Robinson (NED)	Netherlands	s.t.
4	André Vlayen (BEL)	Belgium	+ 2' 04"
5	Gerrit Voorting (NED)	Netherlands	s.t.
6	Antonio Barbosa Alves (POR)	Luxembourg Mixed	s.t.
7	Nello Lauredi (FRA)	France – South-East	s.t.
8	Daan de Groot (NED)	Netherlands	+ 5' 34"
9	Pierre Barbotin (FRA)	France	+ 6' 36"
10	Jan Adriaensens (BEL)	Belgium	+ 6' 40"

General classification after stage 1

Rank	Rider	Team	Time
1	André Darrigade (FRA)	France	5h 19' 15"
2	Fritz Schär (SUI)	Switzerland	s.t.
3	Brian Robinson (NED)	Netherlands	s.t.
4	André Vlayen (BEL)	Belgium	+ 2' 04"
5	Gerrit Voorting (NED)	Netherlands	s.t.
6	Antonio Barbosa Alves (POR)	Luxembourg Mixed	s.t.
7	Nello Lauredi (FRA)	France – South-East	s.t.
8	Daan de Groot (NED)	Netherlands	+ 5' 34"
9	Pierre Barbotin (FRA)	France	+ 6' 36"
10	Jan Adriaensens (BEL)	Belgium	+ 6' 40"

== Stage 2 ==
6 July 1956 - Liège to Lille, 217 km (134.8 mi)

Stage 2 result

Rank	Rider	Team	Time
1	Fred De Bruyne (BEL)	Belgium	6h 35' 31"
2	Pierre Pardoën (FRA)	France – North-East/Centre	s.t.
3	Jean Malléjac (FRA)	France	s.t.
4	Jean-Pierre Schmitz (LUX)	Luxembourg Mixed	s.t.
5	Louis Caput (FRA)	France – West	+ 49"
6	Roger Hassenforder (FRA)	France – West	s.t.
7	Antonin Rolland (FRA)	France	s.t.
8	Nicolas Barone (FRA)	France – Île-de-France	s.t.
9	Gilbert Scodeller (FRA)	France – North-East/Centre	s.t.
10	Bruno Monti (ITA)	Italy	s.t.

General classification after stage 2

Rank	Rider	Team	Time
1	André Darrigade (FRA)	France	11h 54' 35"
2	Fritz Schär (SUI)	Switzerland	+ 2' 26"
3	Brian Robinson (GBR)	Luxembourg Mixed	+ 2' 56"
4	Nello Lauredi (FRA)	France – South-East	+ 3' 04"
5	Gerrit Voorting (NED)	Netherlands	+ 3' 28"
6	André Vlayen (BEL)	Belgium	+ 6' 28"
7	Fred De Bruyne (BEL)	Belgium	+ 6' 39"
8	Daan de Groot (NED)	Netherlands	+ 6' 58"
9	Jean Malléjac (FRA)	France	+ 7' 39"
10	Jean-Pierre Schmitz (LUX)	Luxembourg Mixed	s.t.

== Stage 3 ==
7 July 1956 - Lille to Rouen, 225 km (140 mi)

Stage 3 result

Rank	Rider	Team	Time
1	Arigo Padovan (ITA)	Italy	6h 34' 31"
2	Gilbert Desmet (BEL)	Belgium	s.t.
3	Claude Le Ber (FRA)	France – West	s.t.
4	François Mahé (FRA)	France	s.t.
5	Roger Chaussabel (FRA)	France – South-East	+ 10"
6	Leo van der Pluym (NED)	Netherlands	s.t.
7	Claude Frei (SUI)	Switzerland	s.t.
8	Antonio Barbosa Alves (POR)	Luxembourg Mixed	+ 20"
9	Camille Huyghe (FRA)	France – North-East/Centre	+ 1' 25"
10	Fernand Picot (FRA)	France – West	+ 14' 54"

General classification after stage 3

Rank	Rider	Team	Time
1	Gilbert Desmet (BEL)	Belgium	18h 37' 02"
2	François Mahé (FRA)	France	+ 32"
3	Camille Huyghe (FRA)	France – North-East/Centre	+ 1' 57"
4	Arigo Padovan (ITA)	Italy	+ 4' 26"
5	André Darrigade (FRA)	France	+ 7' 10"
6	Antonio Barbosa Alves (POR)	Luxembourg Mixed	+ 7' 21"
7	Fritz Schär (SUI)	Switzerland	+ 9' 36"
8	Brian Robinson (GBR)	Luxembourg Mixed	+ 10' 06"
9	Nello Lauredi (FRA)	France – South-East	+ 10' 14"
10	Gerrit Voorting (NED)	Netherlands	+ 10' 38"

== Stage 4a ==
8 July 1956 - Circuit de Rouen-Les-Essarts, 15.1 km (9.4 mi) (ITT)

Stage 4a result

Rank	Rider	Team	Time
1	Charly Gaul (LUX)	Luxembourg Mixed	22' 19"
2	Jean Brankart (BEL)	Belgium	+ 27"
3	Federico Bahamontes (ESP)	Spain	+ 32"
4	Stan Ockers (BEL)	Belgium	+ 33"
5	Jean-Pierre Schmitz (LUX)	Luxembourg Mixed	+ 45"
6	Raymond Elena (FRA)	France – South-East	+ 47"
7	Gilbert Bauvin (FRA)	France	+ 48"
8	Pasquale Fornara (ITA)	Italy	+ 50"
9	Gilbert Desmet (BEL)	Belgium	+ 58"
10	Agostino Coletto (ITA)	Italy	+ 1' 01"

General classification after stage 4a

Rank	Rider	Team	Time
1	Gilbert Desmet (BEL)	Belgium	19h 00' 19"
2	François Mahé (FRA)	France	+ 47"
3	Camille Huyghe (FRA)	France – North-East/Centre	+ 2' 58"
4	Arigo Padovan (ITA)	Italy	+ 5' 12"
5	André Darrigade (FRA)	France	+ 7' 28"
6	Antonio Barbosa Alves (POR)	Luxembourg Mixed	+ 7' 39"
7	Fritz Schär (SUI)	Switzerland	+ 9' 40"
8	Nello Lauredi (FRA)	France – South-East	+ 10' 21"
9	Brian Robinson (GBR)	Luxembourg Mixed	+ 10' 43"
10	Gerrit Voorting (NED)	Netherlands	+ 11' 23"

== Stage 4b ==
8 July 1956 - Rouen to Caen, 125 km (78 mi)

Stage 4b result

Rank	Rider	Team	Time
1	Roger Hassenforder (FRA)	France – West	2h 56' 44"
2	Gerrit Voorting (NED)	Netherlands	s.t.
3	René Privat (FRA)	France	s.t.
4	Fernand Picot (FRA)	France – West	s.t.
5	Pierre Barbotin (FRA)	France	s.t.
6	Armand Audaire (FRA)	France – West	s.t.
7	Albert Dolhats (FRA)	France – South-West	+ 1' 42"
8	Roger Walkowiak (FRA)	France – North-East/Centre	s.t.
9	Miguel Poblet (ESP)	Spain	+ 1' 45"
10	Stan Ockers (BEL)	Belgium	s.t.

General classification after stage 4b

Rank	Rider	Team	Time
1	André Darrigade (FRA)	France	22h 06' 16"
2	Gerrit Voorting (NED)	Netherlands	+ 1' 30"
3	Nello Lauredi (FRA)	France – South-East	+ 2' 53"
4	Brian Robinson (GBR)	Luxembourg Mixed	+ 3' 15"
5	Leo van der Pluym (NED)	Netherlands	+ 5' 27"
6	Gilbert Desmet (BEL)	Belgium	+ 6' 40"
7	André Vlayen (BEL)	Belgium	+ 6' 44"
8	François Mahé (FRA)	France	+ 7' 27"
9	Pierre Barbotin (FRA)	France	+ 7' 42"
10	Stan Ockers (BEL)	Belgium	+ 8' 09"

== Stage 5 ==
9 July 1956 - Caen to Saint-Malo, 189 km (117 mi)

Stage 5 result

Rank	Rider	Team	Time
1	Joseph Morvan (FRA)	France – West	4h 51' 49"
2	Alessandro Fantini (ITA)	Italy	s.t.
3	Daan de Groot (NED)	Netherlands	s.t.
4	Raymond Hoorelbeke (FRA)	France – Île-de-France	s.t.
5	Michel Stolker (NED)	Netherlands	s.t.
6	Mario Bertolo (ITA)	France – North-East/Centre	s.t.
7	Joseph Mirando (FRA)	France – South-East	s.t.
8	Roger Walkowiak (FRA)	France – North-East/Centre	s.t.
9	Jean Forestier (FRA)	France	s.t.
10	Jan Nolten (NED)	Netherlands	s.t.

General classification after stage 5

Rank	Rider	Team	Time
1	André Darrigade (FRA)	France	27h 01' 32"
2	Gerrit Voorting (NED)	Netherlands	+ 1' 30"
3	Nello Lauredi (FRA)	France – South-East	+ 2' 53"
4	Brian Robinson (GBR)	Luxembourg Mixed	+ 3' 15"
5	Daan de Groot (NED)	Netherlands	+ 5' 13"
6	Leo van der Pluym (NED)	Netherlands	+ 5' 27"
7	Gilbert Desmet (BEL)	Belgium	+ 6' 40"
8	André Vlayen (BEL)	Belgium	+ 6' 44"
9	Roger Walkowiak (FRA)	France – North-East/Centre	+ 7' 18"
10	François Mahé (FRA)	France	+ 7' 27"

== Stage 6 ==
10 July 1956 - Saint-Malo to Lorient, 192 km (119 mi)

Stage 6 result

Rank	Rider	Team	Time
1	Fred De Bruyne (BEL)	Belgium	4h 39' 19"
2	Joseph Thomin (FRA)	France – West	s.t.
3	Louis Caput (FRA)	France – West	s.t.
4	Bruno Monti (ITA)	Italy	s.t.
5	Claude Le Ber (FRA)	France – West	s.t.
6	Daan de Groot (NED)	Netherlands	s.t.
7	Armand Audaire (FRA)	France – West	s.t.
8	André Darrigade (FRA)	France	s.t.
9	Fernand Picot (FRA)	France – West	s.t.
10	André Vlayen (BEL)	Belgium	s.t.

General classification after stage 6

Rank	Rider	Team	Time
1	André Darrigade (FRA)	France	31h 40' 51"
2	Daan de Groot (NED)	Netherlands	+ 5' 13"
3	Leo van der Pluym (NED)	Netherlands	+ 5' 27"
4	André Vlayen (BEL)	Belgium	+ 6' 44"
5	Roger Walkowiak (FRA)	France – North-East/Centre	+ 7' 18"
6	Fernand Picot (FRA)	France – West	+ 8' 40"
7	Gilbert Scodeller (FRA)	France – North-East/Centre	+ 10' 11"
8	René Privat (FRA)	France	+ 10' 14"
9	Gerrit Voorting (NED)	Netherlands	+ 12' 55"
10	Nello Lauredi (FRA)	France – South-East	+ 14' 18"

== Stage 7 ==
11 July 1956 - Lorient to Angers, 244 km (152 mi)

Stage 7 result

Rank	Rider	Team	Time
1	Alessandro Fantini (ITA)	Italy	5h 59' 20"
2	Gerrit Voorting (NED)	Netherlands	s.t.
3	Piet Van De Brekel (NED)	Netherlands	s.t.
4	Gilbert Bauvin (FRA)	France	s.t.
5	Gilbert Desmet (BEL)	Belgium	s.t.
6	Arigo Padovan (ITA)	Italy	s.t.
7	Jos Hinsen (NED)	Netherlands	s.t.
8	Louis Caput (FRA)	France – West	s.t.
9	Albert Dolhats (FRA)	France – South-West	s.t.
10	Wout Wagtmans (NED)	Netherlands	s.t.

General classification after stage 7

Rank	Rider	Team	Time
1	Roger Walkowiak (FRA)	France – North-East/Centre	37h 47' 29"
2	Fernand Picot (FRA)	France – West	+ 1' 22"
3	Gilbert Scodeller (FRA)	France – North-East/Centre	+ 2' 53"
4	Gerrit Voorting (NED)	Netherlands	+ 5' 07"
5	Nello Lauredi (FRA)	France – South-East	+ 7' 00"
6	Wout Wagtmans (NED)	Netherlands	+ 10' 28"
7	Gilbert Desmet (BEL)	Belgium	+ 10' 38"
8	André Darrigade (FRA)	France	+ 11' 28"
9	Gilbert Bauvin (FRA)	France	+ 12' 31"
10	Jan Adriaensens (BEL)	Belgium	+ 15' 19"

== Stage 8 ==
12 July 1956 - Angers to La Rochelle, 180 km (110 mi)

Stage 8 result

Rank	Rider	Team	Time
1	Miguel Poblet (ESP)	Spain	4h 14' 56"
2	Louis Caput (FRA)	France – West	s.t.
3	Daan de Groot (NED)	Netherlands	s.t.
4	Max Schellenberg (SUI)	Switzerland	s.t.
5	Maurice Quentin (FRA)	France – West	s.t.
6	René Privat (FRA)	France	s.t.
7	Brian Robinson (GBR)	Luxembourg Mixed	s.t.
8	Alfred Tonello (FRA)	France – Île-de-France	s.t.
9	Jan Adriaensens (BEL)	Belgium	s.t.
10	Pietro Giudici (ITA)	Italy	s.t.

General classification after stage 8

Rank	Rider	Team	Time
1	Roger Walkowiak (FRA)	France – North-East/Centre	42h 09' 46"
2	Fernand Picot (FRA)	France – West	+ 1' 22"
3	Gilbert Scodeller (FRA)	France – North-East/Centre	+ 2' 53"
4	Gerrit Voorting (NED)	Netherlands	+ 5' 07"
5	Wout Wagtmans (NED)	Netherlands	+ 6' 20"
6	Nello Lauredi (FRA)	France – South-East	+ 7' 00"
7	André Darrigade (FRA)	France	+ 7' 20"
8	Jan Adriaensens (BEL)	Belgium	+ 7' 58"
9	Daan de Groot (NED)	Netherlands	+ 9' 20"
10	Gilbert Desmet (BEL)	Belgium	+ 10' 38"

== Stage 9 ==
13 July 1956 - La Rochelle to Bordeaux, 219 km (136 mi)

Stage 9 result

Rank	Rider	Team	Time
1	Roger Hassenforder (FRA)	France – West	5h 31' 00"
2	Leo van der Pluym (NED)	Netherlands	s.t.
3	Claude Le Ber (FRA)	France – West	+ 55"
4	Gilbert Desmet (BEL)	Belgium	s.t.
5	Albert Dolhats (FRA)	France – South-West	s.t.
6	André Darrigade (FRA)	France	+ 1' 07"
7	Stan Ockers (BEL)	Belgium	s.t.
8	Miguel Bover (ESP)	Spain	s.t.
9	Arigo Padovan (ITA)	Italy	s.t.
10	Gilbert Bauvin (FRA)	France	s.t.

General classification after stage 9

Rank	Rider	Team	Time
1	Roger Walkowiak (FRA)	France – North-East/Centre	47h 41' 53"
2	Fernand Picot (FRA)	France – West	+ 1' 22"
3	Gerrit Voorting (NED)	Netherlands	+ 5' 07"
4	Wout Wagtmans (NED)	Netherlands	+ 6' 20"
5	Nello Lauredi (FRA)	France – South-East	+ 7' 00"
6	André Darrigade (FRA)	France	+ 7' 20"
7	Jan Adriaensens (BEL)	Belgium	+ 7' 58"
8	Daan de Groot (NED)	Netherlands	+ 9' 20"
9	Gilbert Desmet (BEL)	Belgium	+ 10' 26"
10	Louis Caput (FRA)	France – West	+ 11' 53"

== Rest Day 1 ==
14 July 1956 - Bordeaux

== Stage 10 ==
15 July 1956 - Bordeaux to Bayonne, 201 km (125 mi)

Stage 10 result

Rank	Rider	Team	Time
1	Fred De Bruyne (BEL)	Belgium	4h 59' 39"
2	André Darrigade (FRA)	France	s.t.
3	Gilbert Desmet (BEL)	Belgium	s.t.
4	Bruno Monti (ITA)	Italy	s.t.
5	Nello Lauredi (FRA)	France – South-East	s.t.
6	Maurice Quentin (FRA)	France – West	s.t.
7	Miguel Chacón (ESP)	Spain	s.t.
8	Gilbert Bauvin (FRA)	France	s.t.
9	Nicolas Barone (FRA)	France – Île-de-France	s.t.
10	Nino Defilippis (ITA)	Italy	s.t.

General classification after stage 10

Rank	Rider	Team	Time
1	Gerrit Voorting (NED)	Netherlands	52h 46' 39"
2	André Darrigade (FRA)	France	+ 1' 43"
3	Nello Lauredi (FRA)	France – South-East	+ 1' 53"
4	Jan Adriaensens (BEL)	Belgium	+ 2' 51"
5	Gilbert Desmet (BEL)	Belgium	+ 5' 19"
6	Gilbert Bauvin (FRA)	France	+ 7' 24"
7	Roger Walkowiak (FRA)	France – North-East/Centre	+ 9' 04"
8	Fernand Picot (FRA)	France – West	+ 10' 26"
9	Wout Wagtmans (NED)	Netherlands	+ 15' 24"
10	Bruno Monti (ITA)	Italy	s.t.

== Stage 11 ==
16 July 1956 - Bayonne to Pau, 255 km (158 mi)

Stage 11 result

Rank	Rider	Team	Time
1	Nino Defilippis (ITA)	Italy	4h 49' 46"
2	Stan Ockers (BEL)	Belgium	s.t.
3	André Darrigade (FRA)	France	s.t.
4	Jean Forestier (FRA)	France	s.t.
5	Charly Gaul (LUX)	Luxembourg Mixed	s.t.
6	Federico Bahamontes (ESP)	Spain	s.t.
7	Jean Brankart (BEL)	Belgium	s.t.
8	Roger Walkowiak (FRA)	France – North-East/Centre	s.t.
9	Wout Wagtmans (NED)	Netherlands	s.t.
10	Valentin Huot (FRA)	France – South-West	s.t.

General classification after stage 11

Rank	Rider	Team	Time
1	André Darrigade (FRA)	France	59h 24' 19"
2	Jan Adriaensens (BEL)	Belgium	+ 1' 08"
3	Gerrit Voorting (NED)	Netherlands	+ 2' 19"
4	Nello Lauredi (FRA)	France – South-East	+ 4' 12"
5	Gilbert Bauvin (FRA)	France	+ 5' 41"
6	Gilbert Desmet (BEL)	Belgium	+ 6' 59"
7	Roger Walkowiak (FRA)	France – North-East/Centre	+ 7' 21"
8	Fernand Picot (FRA)	France – West	+ 12' 45"
9	Wout Wagtmans (NED)	Netherlands	+ 13' 41"
10	Bruno Monti (ITA)	Italy	+ 17' 43"
