= 1956 Tour de France, Stage 12 to Stage 22 =

Cycling race stages

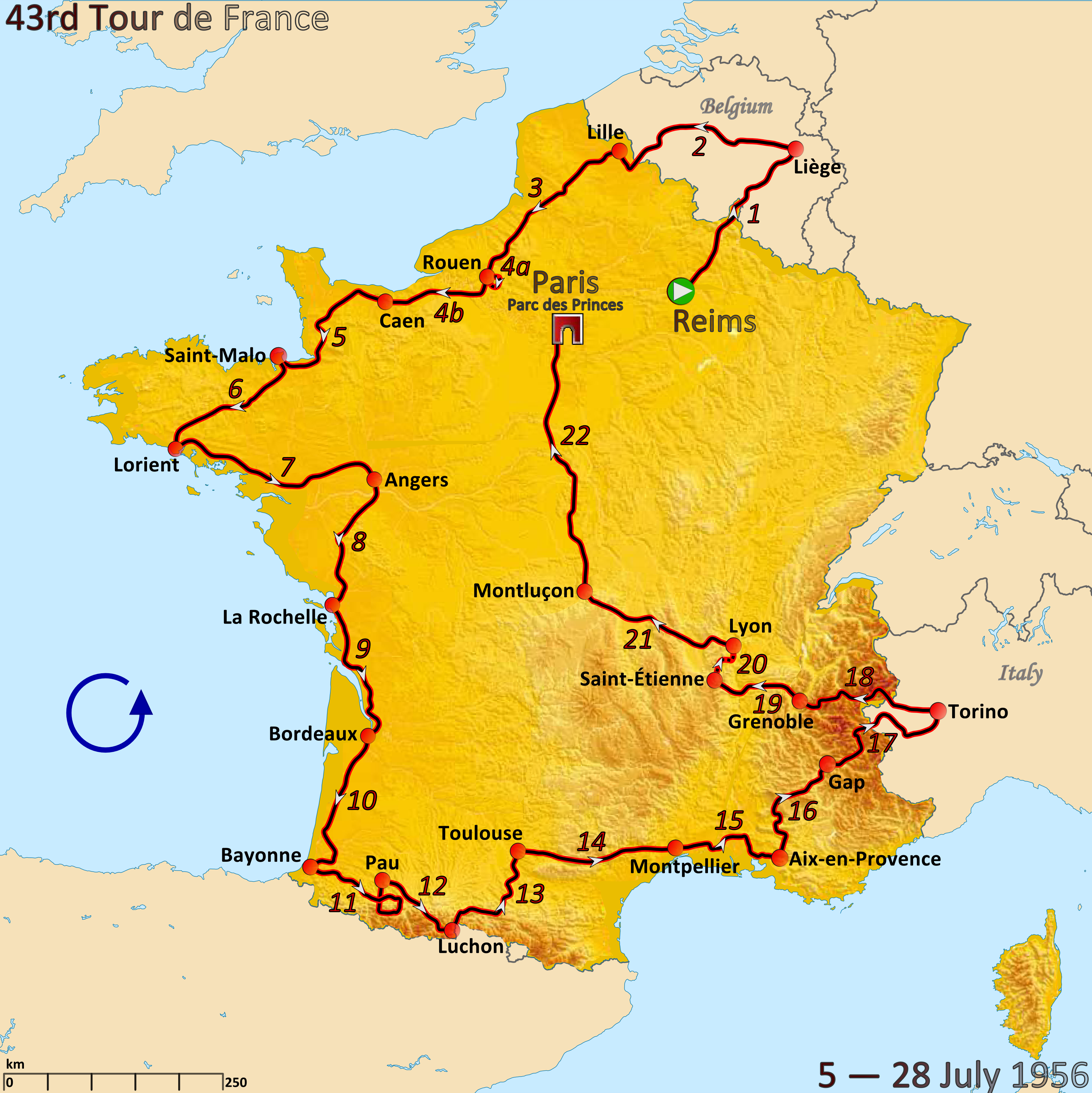
Route of the 1956 Tour de France

The 1956 Tour de France was the 43rd edition of Tour de France, one of cycling's Grand Tours. The Tour began in Reims with a flat stage on 5 July and Stage 12 occurred on 17 July with a mountainous stage from Pau. The race finished in Paris on 28 July.

== Stage 12 ==
17 July 1956 - Pau to Luchon, 130 km (80.8 mi)

Stage 12 result

Rank	Rider	Team	Time
1	Jean-Pierre Schmitz (LUX)	Luxembourg Mixed	3h 54' 40"
2	Fernand Picot (FRA)	France – West	+ 2' 08"
3	Bernardo Ruiz (ESP)	Spain	+ 2' 10"
4	Joseph Morvan (FRA)	France – West	+ 2' 30"
5	Valentin Huot (FRA)	France – South-West	+ 2' 34"
6	Richard Van Genechten (BEL)	Belgium	+ 4' 14"
7	Antonio Barbosa Alves (POR)	Luxembourg Mixed	s.t.
8	Raymond Meyzenq (FRA)	France – South-East	+ 4' 49"
9	Nino Defilippis (ITA)	Italy	+ 5' 03"
10	Federico Bahamontes (ESP)	Spain	+ 5' 24"

General classification after stage 12

Rank	Rider	Team	Time
1	Jan Adriaensens (BEL)	Belgium	63h 28' 19"
2	Nello Lauredi (FRA)	France – South-East	+ 2' 53"
3	Gerrit Voorting (NED)	Netherlands	+ 3' 47"
4	Gilbert Bauvin (FRA)	France	+ 3' 54"
5	André Darrigade (FRA)	France	+ 4' 57"
6	Fernand Picot (FRA)	France – West	+ 5' 08"
7	Roger Walkowiak (FRA)	France – North-East/Centre	+ 5' 40"
8	Gilbert Desmet (BEL)	Belgium	+ 12' 04"
9	Nino Defilippis (ITA)	Italy	+ 14' 54"
10	Wout Wagtmans (NED)	Netherlands	+ 18' 38"

== Stage 13 ==
18 July 1956 - Luchon to Toulouse, 176 km (109 mi)

Stage 13 result

Rank	Rider	Team	Time
1	Nino Defilippis (ITA)	Italy	4h 49' 46"
2	Fernand Picot (FRA)	France – West	s.t.
3	Stan Ockers (BEL)	Belgium	s.t.
4	Joseph Thomin (FRA)	France – West	s.t.
5	Marcel Ernzer (LUX)	Luxembourg Mixed	s.t.
6	Gerrit Voorting (NED)	Netherlands	s.t.
7	Daan de Groot (NED)	Netherlands	s.t.
8	Robert Gibanel (FRA)	France – South-West	s.t.
9	Miguel Bover (ESP)	Spain	s.t.
10	Adolphe Deledda (FRA)	France – North-East/Centre	s.t.

General classification after stage 13

Rank	Rider	Team	Time
1	Jan Adriaensens (BEL)	Belgium	68h 18' 05"
2	Nello Lauredi (FRA)	France – South-East	+ 2' 53"
3	Gerrit Voorting (NED)	Netherlands	+ 3' 47"
4	Fernand Picot (FRA)	France – West	+ 4' 38"
5	Roger Walkowiak (FRA)	France – North-East/Centre	+ 5' 40"
6	André Darrigade (FRA)	France	+ 7' 11"
7	Gilbert Bauvin (FRA)	France	+ 7' 46"
8	Nino Defilippis (ITA)	Italy	+ 13' 54"
9	Wout Wagtmans (NED)	Netherlands	+ 18' 38"
10	Bruno Monti (ITA)	Italy	+ 18' 54"

== Stage 14 ==
19 July 1956 - Toulouse to Montpellier, 231 km (144 mi)

Stage 14 result

Rank	Rider	Team	Time
1	Roger Hassenforder (FRA)	France – West	5h 26' 05"
2	Daan de Groot (NED)	Netherlands	s.t.
3	Wout Wagtmans (NED)	Netherlands	s.t.
4	Federico Bahamontes (ESP)	Spain	s.t.
5	Claude Le Ber (FRA)	France – West	s.t.
6	Pierre Beuffeuil (FRA)	France – South-West	+ 41"
7	Alessandro Fantini (ITA)	Italy	+ 1' 15"
8	Max Schellenberg (SUI)	Switzerland	s.t.
9	Bruno Monti (ITA)	Italy	s.t.
10	René Marigil (ESP)	Spain	s.t.

General classification after stage 14

Rank	Rider	Team	Time
1	Jan Adriaensens (BEL)	Belgium	74h 01' 35"
2	Wout Wagtmans (NED)	Netherlands	+ 1' 13"
3	Bruno Monti (ITA)	Italy	+ 2' 44"
4	Nello Lauredi (FRA)	France – South-East	+ 2' 53"
5	Gerrit Voorting (NED)	Netherlands	+ 3' 47"
6	Fernand Picot (FRA)	France – West	+ 4' 38"
7	Roger Walkowiak (FRA)	France – North-East/Centre	+ 5' 40"
8	André Darrigade (FRA)	France	+ 7' 11"
9	Gilbert Bauvin (FRA)	France	+ 7' 46"
10	Daan de Groot (NED)	Netherlands	+ 12' 22"

== Stage 15 ==
20 July 1956 - Montpellier to Aix-en-Provence, 204 km (127 mi)

Stage 15 result

Rank	Rider	Team	Time
1	Joseph Thomin (FRA)	France – West	5h 01' 10"
2	Jean Forestier (FRA)	France	s.t.
3	Pietro Giudici (ITA)	Italy	s.t.
4	Salvador Botella (ESP)	Spain	s.t.
5	Pierre Scribante (FRA)	France – North-East/Centre	s.t.
6	Pierre Barbotin (FRA)	France	s.t.
7	Arigo Padovan (ITA)	Italy	+ 14"
8	Stan Ockers (BEL)	Belgium	s.t.
9	Fernand Picot (FRA)	France – West	s.t.
10	Adolphe Deledda (FRA)	France – North-East/Centre	s.t.

General classification after stage 15

Rank	Rider	Team	Time
1	Wout Wagtmans (NED)	Netherlands	79h 04' 12"
2	Nello Lauredi (FRA)	France – South-East	+ 1' 40"
3	Gerrit Voorting (NED)	Netherlands	+ 2' 34"
4	Fernand Picot (FRA)	France – West	+ 3' 25"
5	Roger Walkowiak (FRA)	France – North-East/Centre	+ 4' 27"
6	André Darrigade (FRA)	France	+ 5' 58"
7	Gilbert Bauvin (FRA)	France	+ 6' 33"
8	Jan Adriaensens (BEL)	Belgium	+ 7' 19"
9	Bruno Monti (ITA)	Italy	+ 7' 42"
10	Nino Defilippis (ITA)	Italy	+ 12' 41"

== Rest Day 2 ==
21 July 1956 - Aix-en-Provence

== Stage 16 ==
22 July 1956 - Aix-en-Provence to Gap, 203 km (126 mi)

Stage 16 result

Rank	Rider	Team	Time
1	Jean Forestier (FRA)	France	5h 30' 15"
2	Pierino Baffi (ITA)	Italy	s.t.
3	Antonio Barbosa Alves (POR)	Luxembourg Mixed	s.t.
4	Richard Van Genechten (BEL)	Belgium	s.t.
5	Maurice Lampre (FRA)	France – South-West	s.t.
6	Jean Lerda (FRA)	France – South-East	s.t.
7	Armand Audaire (FRA)	France – West	s.t.
8	Federico Bahamontes (ESP)	Spain	s.t.
9	Jan Nolten (NED)	Netherlands	s.t.
10	Jesús Loroño (ESP)	Spain	s.t.

General classification after stage 16

Rank	Rider	Team	Time
1	Wout Wagtmans (NED)	Netherlands	84h 42' 14"
2	Nello Lauredi (FRA)	France – South-East	+ 1' 33"
3	Gerrit Voorting (NED)	Netherlands	+ 2' 27"
4	Fernand Picot (FRA)	France – West	+ 3' 25"
5	Roger Walkowiak (FRA)	France – North-East/Centre	+ 4' 27"
6	André Darrigade (FRA)	France	+ 5' 58"
7	Gilbert Bauvin (FRA)	France	+ 6' 33"
8	Jan Adriaensens (BEL)	Belgium	+ 7' 19"
9	Bruno Monti (ITA)	Italy	+ 7' 42"
10	Antonio Barbosa Alves (POR)	Luxembourg Mixed	+ 11' 47"

== Stage 17 ==
23 July 1956 - Gap to Turin, 234 km (145 mi)

Stage 17 result

Rank	Rider	Team	Time
1	Nino Defilippis (ITA)	Italy	6h 42' 09"
2	Stan Ockers (BEL)	Belgium	s.t.
3	Gilbert Bauvin (FRA)	France	s.t.
4	Gastone Nencini (ITA)	Italy	s.t.
5	Roger Walkowiak (FRA)	France – North-East/Centre	s.t.
6	Brian Robinson (GBR)	Luxembourg Mixed	s.t.
7	Alex Close (BEL)	Belgium	s.t.
8	Leo van der Pluym (NED)	Netherlands	s.t.
9	Federico Bahamontes (ESP)	Spain	s.t.
10	Wout Wagtmans (NED)	Netherlands	s.t.

General classification after stage 17

Rank	Rider	Team	Time
1	Wout Wagtmans (NED)	Netherlands	91h 24' 23"
2	Roger Walkowiak (FRA)	France – North-East/Centre	+ 4' 27"
3	Gilbert Bauvin (FRA)	France	+ 6' 33"
4	Jan Adriaensens (BEL)	Belgium	+ 7' 19"
5	Nello Lauredi (FRA)	France – South-East	+ 8' 54"
6	Nino Defilippis (ITA)	Italy	+ 11' 41"
7	Gerrit Voorting (NED)	Netherlands	+ 12' 53"
8	Fernand Picot (FRA)	France – West	+ 13' 51"
9	Federico Bahamontes (ESP)	Spain	+ 18' 08"
10	Bruno Monti (ITA)	Italy	s.t.

== Stage 18 ==
24 July 1956 - Turin to Grenoble, 250 km (160 mi)

Stage 18 result

Rank	Rider	Team	Time
1	Charly Gaul (LUX)	Luxembourg Mixed	8h 14' 11"
2	Stan Ockers (BEL)	Belgium	+ 3' 22"
3	Gastone Nencini (ITA)	Italy	+ 7' 29"
4	Federico Bahamontes (ESP)	Spain	s.t.
5	Roger Walkowiak (FRA)	France – North-East/Centre	s.t.
6	Arigo Padovan (ITA)	Italy	+ 9' 19"
7	Brian Robinson (GBR)	Luxembourg Mixed	s.t.
8	Gilbert Bauvin (FRA)	France	s.t.
9	Richard Van Genechten (BEL)	Belgium	s.t.
10	René Privat (FRA)	France	s.t.

General classification after stage 18

Rank	Rider	Team	Time
1	Roger Walkowiak (FRA)	France – North-East/Centre	99h 50' 30"
2	Gilbert Bauvin (FRA)	France	+ 3' 56"
3	Wout Wagtmans (NED)	Netherlands	+ 4' 12"
4	Jan Adriaensens (BEL)	Belgium	+ 8' 44"
5	Nino Defilippis (ITA)	Italy	+ 11' 02"
6	Federico Bahamontes (ESP)	Spain	+ 13' 41"
7	Nello Lauredi (FRA)	France – South-East	+ 14' 40"
8	Fernand Picot (FRA)	France – West	+ 17' 35"
9	René Privat (FRA)	France	+ 19' 18"
10	Antonio Barbosa Alves (POR)	Luxembourg Mixed	+ 22' 17"

== Stage 19 ==
25 July 1956 - Grenoble to Saint-Étienne, 173 km (107 mi)

Stage 19 result

Rank	Rider	Team	Time
1	Stan Ockers (BEL)	Belgium	5h 32' 08"
2	Charly Gaul (LUX)	Luxembourg Mixed	+ 2' 12"
3	Marcel Janssens (BEL)	Belgium	s.t.
4	Federico Bahamontes (ESP)	Spain	s.t.
5	Jean Forestier (FRA)	France	+ 3' 44"
6	Roger Walkowiak (FRA)	France – North-East/Centre	s.t.
7	Valentin Huot (FRA)	France – South-West	s.t.
8	Gilbert Bauvin (FRA)	France	s.t.
9	Jan Adriaensens (BEL)	Belgium	s.t.
10	André Darrigade (FRA)	France	+ 5' 08"

General classification after stage 19

Rank	Rider	Team	Time
1	Roger Walkowiak (FRA)	France – North-East/Centre	105h 26' 52"
2	Gilbert Bauvin (FRA)	France	+ 3' 26"
3	Wout Wagtmans (NED)	Netherlands	+ 7' 18"
4	Jan Adriaensens (BEL)	Belgium	+ 8' 14"
5	Federico Bahamontes (ESP)	Spain	+ 11' 39"
6	Nino Defilippis (ITA)	Italy	+ 11' 56"
7	Nello Lauredi (FRA)	France – South-East	+ 15' 34"
8	Stan Ockers (BEL)	Belgium	+ 20' 11"
9	René Privat (FRA)	France	+ 20' 12"
10	Gerrit Voorting (NED)	Netherlands	+ 26' 41"

== Stage 20 ==
26 July 1956 - Saint-Étienne to Lyon, 73 km (45 mi) (ITT)

Stage 20 result

Rank	Rider	Team	Time
1	Miguel Bover (ESP)	Spain	1h 46' 47"
2	Jan Adriaensens (BEL)	Belgium	+ 1"
3	Claude Le Ber (FRA)	France – West	+ 1' 01"
4	Stan Ockers (BEL)	Belgium	+ 1' 53"
5	Gilbert Bauvin (FRA)	France	+ 2' 37"
6	Charly Gaul (LUX)	Luxembourg Mixed	+ 2' 39"
7	Roger Hassenforder (FRA)	France – West	+ 2' 41"
8	Jean Brankart (BEL)	Belgium	+ 2' 48"
9	Joseph Mirando (FRA)	France – South-East	+ 3' 03"
10	Nello Lauredi (FRA)	France – South-East	+ 3' 05"

General classification after stage 20

Rank	Rider	Team	Time
1	Roger Walkowiak (FRA)	France – North-East/Centre	107h 18' 27"
2	Gilbert Bauvin (FRA)	France	+ 1' 25"
3	Wout Wagtmans (NED)	Netherlands	+ 3' 07"
4	Jan Adriaensens (BEL)	Belgium	+ 10' 14"
5	Federico Bahamontes (ESP)	Spain	+ 10' 56"
6	Nino Defilippis (ITA)	Italy	+ 10' 59"
7	Nello Lauredi (FRA)	France – South-East	+ 14' 01"
8	Stan Ockers (BEL)	Belgium	+ 17' 26"
9	René Privat (FRA)	France	+ 22' 22"
10	Gerrit Voorting (NED)	Netherlands	+ 26' 37"

== Stage 21 ==
27 July 1956 - Lyon to Montluçon, 237 km (147 mi)

Stage 21 result

Rank	Rider	Team	Time
1	Roger Hassenforder (FRA)	France – West	7h 04' 02"
2	Salvador Botella (ESP)	Spain	+ 7' 35"
3	Stan Ockers (BEL)	Belgium	+ 8' 08"
4	Tino Sabbadini (FRA)	France – South-West	s.t.
5	Albert Dolhats (FRA)	France – South-West	s.t.
6	André Darrigade (FRA)	France	s.t.
7	Gerrit Voorting (NED)	Netherlands	s.t.
8	Gilbert Desmet (BEL)	Belgium	s.t.
9	Federico Bahamontes (ESP)	Spain	s.t.
10	Antonio Barbosa Alves (POR)	Luxembourg Mixed	s.t.

General classification after stage 21

Rank	Rider	Team	Time
1	Roger Walkowiak (FRA)	France – North-East/Centre	114h 30' 37"
2	Gilbert Bauvin (FRA)	France	+ 1' 25"
3	Jan Adriaensens (BEL)	Belgium	+ 3' 44"
4	Federico Bahamontes (ESP)	Spain	+ 10' 14"
5	Nino Defilippis (ITA)	Italy	+ 10' 59"
6	Wout Wagtmans (NED)	Netherlands	+ 11' 33"
7	Nello Lauredi (FRA)	France – South-East	+ 14' 01"
8	Stan Ockers (BEL)	Belgium	+ 17' 26"
9	René Privat (FRA)	France	+ 22' 59"
10	Antonio Barbosa Alves (POR)	Luxembourg Mixed	+ 26' 37"

== Stage 22 ==
28 July 1956 - Montluçon to Paris, 331 km (206 mi)

Stage 22 result

Rank	Rider	Team	Time
1	Gastone Nencini (ITA)	Italy	9h 28' 05"
2	Claude Le Ber (FRA)	France – West	s.t.
3	Joseph Mirando (FRA)	France – South-East	s.t.
4	Gilbert Desmet (BEL)	Belgium	s.t.
5	Alessandro Fantini (ITA)	Italy	s.t.
6	Stan Ockers (BEL)	Belgium	s.t.
7	André Darrigade (FRA)	France	s.t.
8	Joseph Thomin (FRA)	France – West	s.t.
9	Gerrit Voorting (NED)	Netherlands	s.t.
10	Agostino Coletto (ITA)	Italy	s.t.

General classification after stage 22

Rank	Rider	Team	Time
1	Roger Walkowiak (FRA)	France – North-East/Centre	124h 01' 16"
2	Gilbert Bauvin (FRA)	France	+ 1' 25"
3	Jan Adriaensens (BEL)	Belgium	+ 3' 44"
4	Federico Bahamontes (ESP)	Spain	+ 10' 14"
5	Nino Defilippis (ITA)	Italy	+ 10' 25"
6	Wout Wagtmans (NED)	Netherlands	+ 10' 59"
7	Nello Lauredi (FRA)	France – South-East	+ 14' 01"
8	Stan Ockers (BEL)	Belgium	+ 16' 52"
9	René Privat (FRA)	France	+ 22' 59"
10	Antonio Barbosa Alves (POR)	Luxembourg Mixed	+ 26' 03"
