= 1956 Tour de France =

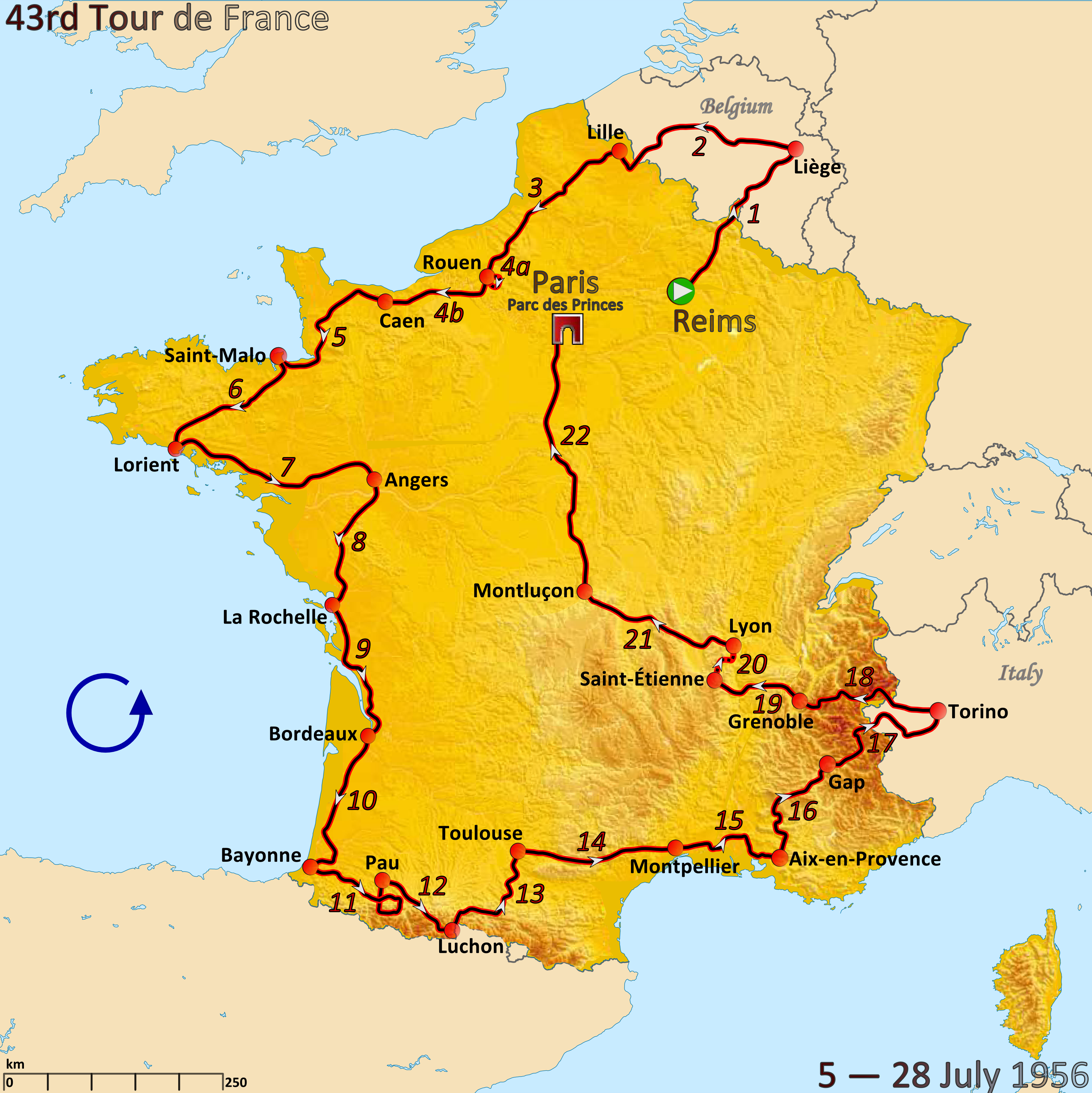
- Route of the 1956 Tour de France followed counterclockwise, starting in Reims and finishing in Paris

Race details
- Dates: 5–28 July 1956
- Stages: 22
- Distance: 4,498 km (2,795 mi)
- Winning time: 124h 01' 16"

Results
Jersey awarded to the overall winner	Winner	Roger Walkowiak (FRA)	(North-East/Centre)
	Second	Gilbert Bauvin (FRA)	(France)
	Third	Jan Adriaensens (BEL)	(Belgium)
Jersey awarded to the points classification winner	Points	Stan Ockers (BEL)	(Belgium)
	Mountains	Charly Gaul (LUX)	(Luxembourg/Mixed)
	Combativity	André Darrigade (FRA)	(France)
	Team	Belgium	

The 1956 Tour de France was the 43rd edition of the Tour de France, taking place from 5 to 28 July. It consisted of 22 stages over 4,498 km (2,795 mi).

There was no previous Tour winner competing for the 1956 Tour, which had only previously happened in 1903 and 1927. An unknown rider from a regional team, Roger Walkowiak on the Northeast-Center French team, ended up winning the Tour. Many Tour fans dismissed the win as being lucky or unworthy at the time, which Walkowiak took hard; this made him not often speak of his win.

The Tour was ridden at the fastest average speed so far, over 36 km/h. Walkowiak became only the second rider, after Firmin Lambot in the 1922 Tour de France, to win without taking a single stage.

== Innovations ==
In the previous years, a flat tyre had to be repaired, but from 1956 on, it was allowed to change wheels.

== Teams ==
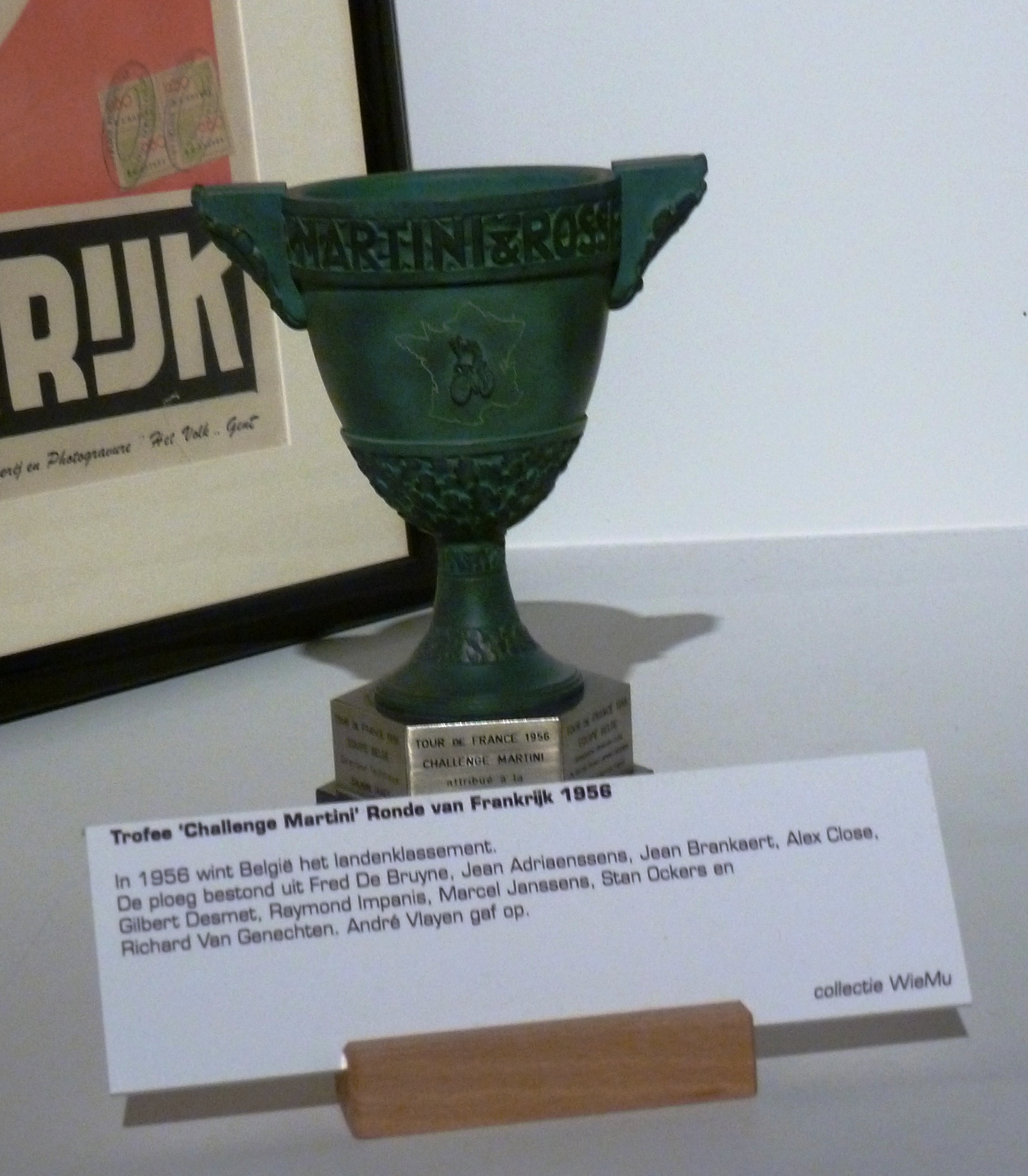
The team classification "Challenge Martini" trophy for 1956, won by the Belgium team

As was the custom since the 1930 Tour de France, the 1956 Tour de France was contested by national and regional teams. Seven national teams were sent, with 10 cyclists each from France, Italy, Belgium, the Netherlands, Spain, Switzerland and Luxembourg/Mixed (the latter a combined team of seven Luxembourgian cyclists added with one Portuguese, one British and one Italian cyclist). France additionally sent five regional teams from 10 cyclists each, divided into North-East/Centre, South-East, West, Île-de-France and South-West. In total, 120 cyclists started the race.

The teams entering the race were:

- France
- Italy
- Belgium
- Netherlands
- Spain
- Switzerland
- Luxembourg/Mixed
- North-East/Centre
- South-East
- West
- Île-de-France
- South-West

== Pre-race favourites ==
The winner of the three previous editions, Louison Bobet, was absent because he had surgery. Because there were fewer climbs and no mountain top finishes, cycling experts expected this edition to be too easy. No other former Tour de France winner started the race. This was the third time in history that the race started without former winners, after the initial 1903 Tour de France and the 1927 Tour de France.

Because Bobet was not there, the race was open, and there were many riders thought able to win the Tour. The most favourite of these was probably Charly Gaul, who had won the 1956 Giro d'Italia, although he was in a weak team, and would also be aiming for the mountains classification.

== Route and stages ==
The 1956 Tour de France started on 5 July, and had two rest days, in Bordeaux and Aix-les-Provence. The highest point of elevation in the race was 2,360 m (7,740 ft) at the summit of the Col d'Izoard mountain pass on stage 17.

Stage characteristics and winners
Stage	Date	Course	Distance	Type	Winner
1	5 July	Reims to Liège (Belgium)	223 km (139 mi)	Plain stage	André Darrigade (FRA)
2	6 July	Liège (Belgium) to Lille	217 km (135 mi)	Plain stage	Fred De Bruyne (BEL)
3	7 July	Lille to Rouen	225 km (140 mi)	Plain stage	Arigo Padovan (ITA)
4a	8 July	Circuit de Rouen-Les-Essarts	15.1 km (9 mi)	Individual time trial	Charly Gaul (LUX)
4b	8 July	Rouen to Caen	125 km (78 mi)	Plain stage	Roger Hassenforder (FRA)
5	9 July	Caen to Saint-Malo	189 km (117 mi)	Plain stage	Joseph Morvan (FRA)
6	10 July	Saint-Malo to Lorient	192 km (119 mi)	Plain stage	Fred De Bruyne (BEL)
7	11 July	Lorient to Angers	244 km (152 mi)	Plain stage	Alessandro Fantini (ITA)
8	12 July	Angers to La Rochelle	180 km (112 mi)	Plain stage	Miguel Poblet (ESP)
9	13 July	La Rochelle to Bordeaux	219 km (136 mi)	Plain stage	Roger Hassenforder (FRA)
	14 July	Bordeaux		Rest day	
10	15 July	Bordeaux to Bayonne	201 km (125 mi)	Plain stage	Fred De Bruyne (BEL)
11	16 July	Bayonne to Pau	255 km (158 mi)	Stage with mountain(s)	Nino Defilippis (ITA)
12	17 July	Pau to Luchon	130 km (81 mi)	Stage with mountain(s)	Jean-Pierre Schmitz (LUX)
13	18 July	Luchon to Toulouse	176 km (109 mi)	Stage with mountain(s)	Nino Defilippis (ITA)
14	19 July	Toulouse to Montpellier	231 km (144 mi)	Plain stage	Roger Hassenforder (FRA)
15	20 July	Montpellier to Aix-en-Provence	204 km (127 mi)	Plain stage	Joseph Thomin (FRA)
	21 July	Aix-en-Provence		Rest day	
16	22 July	Aix-en-Provence to Gap	203 km (126 mi)	Stage with mountain(s)	Jean Forestier (FRA)
17	23 July	Gap to Turin (Italy)	234 km (145 mi)	Stage with mountain(s)	Nino Defilippis (ITA)
18	24 July	Turin (Italy) to Grenoble	250 km (155 mi)	Stage with mountain(s)	Charly Gaul (LUX)
19	25 July	Grenoble to Saint-Étienne	173 km (107 mi)	Stage with mountain(s)	Stan Ockers (BEL)
20	26 July	Saint-Étienne to Lyon	73 km (45 mi)	Individual time trial	Miguel Bover (ESP)
21	27 July	Lyon to Montluçon	237 km (147 mi)	Stage with mountain(s)	Roger Hassenforder (FRA)
22	28 July	Montluçon to Paris	331 km (206 mi)	Plain stage	Gastone Nencini (ITA)
	Total		4,498 km (2,795 mi)		

== Race overview ==
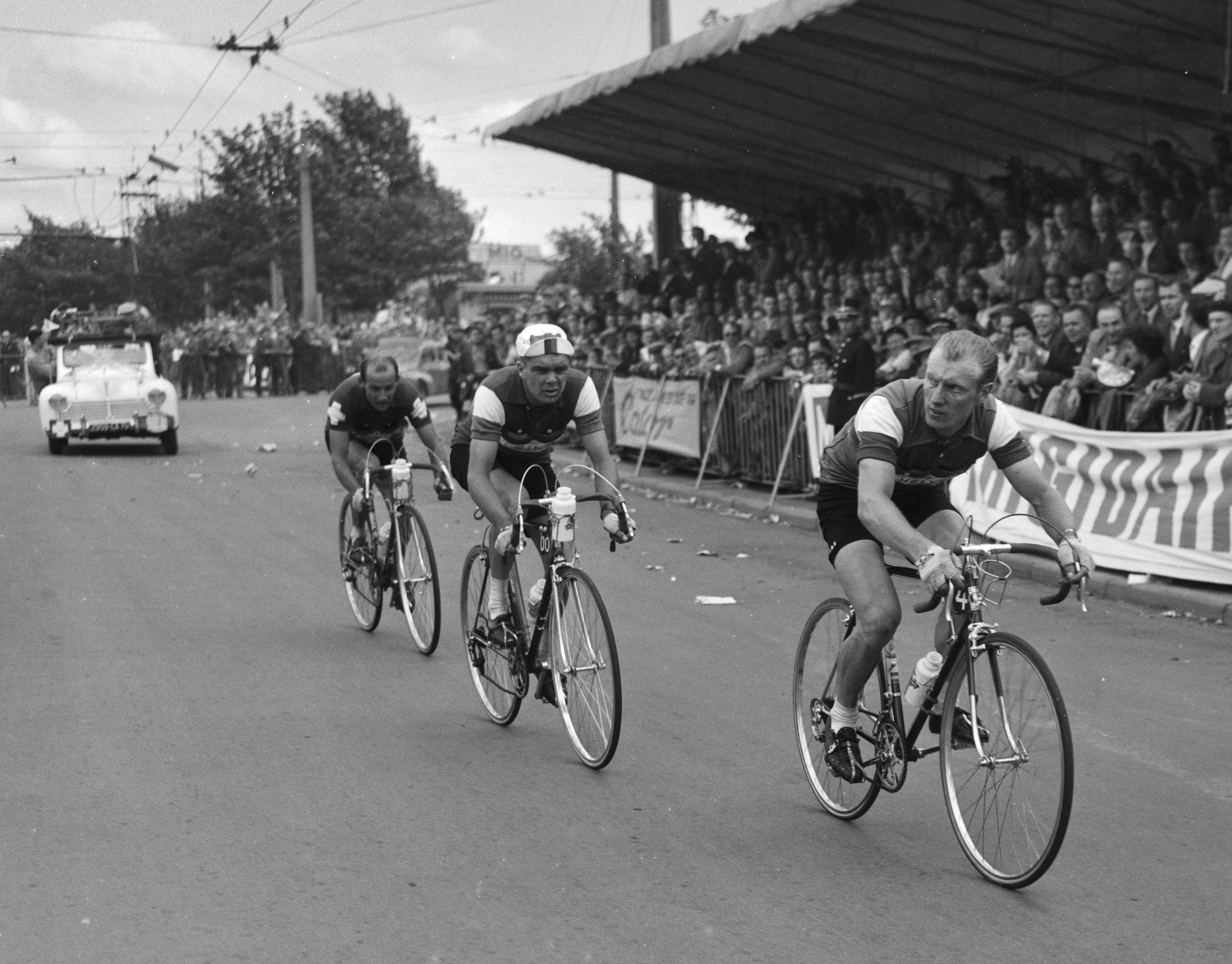
André Darrigade leading into the finish of stage one in Liège, Belgium, which he won

The first stage was won by André Darrigade, one of the best sprinters of that time. In the third stage, a small group escaped and finished with a margin of fifteen minutes; Gilbert Desmet became the new leader. The time trial of stage four was won by Gaul. In the second part of the fourth stage, Roger Hassenforder escaped, and a took a group with him, including Darrigade. Desmet was not in that group, and lost more than 15 minutes, which made Darrigade leader again.

In the seventh stage, the peloton broke in two, and a large group of 31 cyclists finished more than 18 minutes ahead. This group included Roger Walkowiak, who had also been in the escaped group in the fourth stage, and became the new leader. Walkowiak's team manager, Sauveur Ducazeaux, advised Walkowiak that it would be too tough to try to remain the leader for the rest of the race, and suggested that Walkowiak lose the first place, and aim to regain it later in the race. In the tenth stage, Walkowiak lost time, and Gerrit Voorting who had also been part of the large breakaway group in stage seven, became the new leader. Voorting lost the lead in the next stage to Darrigade, who himself lost the lead to Jan Adriaensens in the twelfth stage.

In the fifteenth stage, the entire Belgian team was weak. Most Tour followers thought it was due to a doping practice that went wrong, but officially it was attributed to food poisoning. Adriaensens lost more than nine minutes, which made Wout Wagtmans the new leader. During the seventeenth stage, there was yet another escape, which included leader Wagtmans and Walkowiak, in fifth position in the general classification. The riders in second, third and fourth place were not in the escape, so Walkowiak moved up to the second place, more than four minutes behind Wagtmans. The eighteenth stage was the last chance for the climbing specialists to win back time, and so Gaul, Bahamontes and Ockers were aiming to win back time. Gaul escaped, and won the stage alone, with Ockers in second place. During the last climb, Bahamontes dismounted and threw his bike down the ravine, wanting to stop the race. The Spanish team was able to retrieve the bike, and convince Bahamontes to continue. Bahamontes finished the race in the group behind Ockers. The surprise of the day was that Walkowiak had been able to remain with Bahamontes, whereas Wagtmans (normally a decent climber) lost eight minutes more. Walkowiak took the first place in the general classification, with a margin of almost 4 minutes to Gilbert Bauvin.

In the time trial of stage 20, Bauvin performed very well, finishing in fifth place. Walkowiak ended in 24th place, but this was enough to keep a 1'25" lead. In the 21st stage, Roger Hassenforder won his fourth stage of this Tour, after a solitary breakaway of 187 km.

== Classification leadership and minor prizes ==
The time that each cyclist required to finish each stage was recorded, and these times were added together for the general classification. If a cyclist had received a time bonus, it was subtracted from this total; all time penalties were added to this total. The cyclist with the least accumulated time was the race leader, identified by the yellow jersey. Of the 120 cyclists that started the 1956 Tour de France, 88 finished the race.

The points classification in 1956 was calculated in the same way as since the introduction in 1953, following the calculation method from the Tours de France from 1905 to 1912. Points were given according to the ranking of the stage: the winner received one point, the next cyclist two points, and so on. These points were added, and the cyclist with the fewest points was the leader of the points classification. In 1956, this was won by Stan Ockers with 280 points. Over 22 stages (including one split stage), this meant that his average stage finish was approximately place 13.

Points for the mountains classification were earned by reaching the mountain tops first. The system was almost the same as in 1955: there were three types of mountain tops: the hardest ones, in category 1, gave 10 points to the first cyclist, the easier ones, in category 2, gave 6 points to the first cyclist, and the easiest ones, in category 3, gave 3 points. Charly Gaul won this classification.

The team classification was calculated as the sum of the daily team classifications, and the daily team classification was calculated by adding the times in the stage result of the best three cyclists per team. It was won by the Belgian team, with a large margin over the Italian team. Every team finished with at least three cyclists, so all teams were included in the team classification.

In addition, there was a combativity award given after each stage to the cyclist considered most combative. The split stages each had a combined winner. The decision was made by a jury composed of journalists who gave points. The cyclist with the most points from votes in all stages led the combativity classification. André Darrigade won this classification, and was given overall the super-combativity award. After every stage, the jury also gave a prize to the cyclist with the most bad luck. The award for most bad luck during the entire Tour de France went to Fernand Picot. The Souvenir Henri Desgrange was given in honour of Tour founder Henri Desgrange to the first rider to pass a point on stage 2 in village of Cysoing in the far north, marking 200,000 kilometres travelled in Tour de France history. This prize was won by Pierre Pardoën.

Classification leadership by stage
Stage	Winner	General classification	Points classification	Mountains classification (Note: No jersey was awarded to the leader of the mountains classification until a white jersey with red polka dots was introduced in 1975.)	Team classification	Combativity		Bad luck award
Stage	Winner	General classification	Points classification	Mountains classification	Team classification	Award	Classification	Bad luck award
1	André Darrigade	André Darrigade	André Darrigade	no award	Luxembourg/Mixed	Brian Robinson	Brian Robinson	Pierre Pardoën
2	Fred De Bruyne	André Darrigade	André Darrigade	no award	Luxembourg/Mixed	Pierre Pardoën	Brian Robinson	Raymond Elena
3	Arigo Padovan	Gilbert Desmet	Antonin Rolland	no award	Luxembourg/Mixed	Claude Le Ber	Brian Robinson	Camille Huyghe
4a	Charly Gaul	Gilbert Desmet	Antonin Rolland	no award	Luxembourg/Mixed	Pierre Barbotin	Brian Robinson	Alex Close
4b	Roger Hassenforder	André Darrigade	Roger Hassenforder	no award	France	Pierre Barbotin	Brian Robinson	Alex Close
5	Joseph Morvan	André Darrigade	Roger Hassenforder	no award	France	Mario Bertolo	Brian Robinson	Miguel Poblet
6	Fred De Bruyne	André Darrigade	Daan de Groot	no award	France	André Darrigade	André Darrigade	René Marigil
7	Alessandro Fantini	Roger Walkowiak	Fernand Picot	no award	Belgium	Nello Lauredi	André Darrigade	Salvador Botella
8	Miguel Poblet	Roger Walkowiak	Daan de Groot	no award	West	André Darrigade	André Darrigade	Stanislas Bober
9	Roger Hassenforder	Roger Walkowiak	Daan de Groot	no award	West	Leo van der Pluym	André Darrigade	Michel Stolker
10	Fred De Bruyne	Gerrit Voorting	Daan de Groot	no award	Belgium	Nicolas Barone	André Darrigade	Alves Barbosa
11	Nino Defilippis	André Darrigade	André Darrigade	Valentin Huot	Belgium	Nino Defilippis	André Darrigade	Joseph Thomin
12	Jean-Pierre Schmitz	Jan Adriaensens	Fernand Picot	Valentin Huot	Belgium	Jean-Pierre Schmitz	André Darrigade	François Mahé
13	Nino Defilippis	Jan Adriaensens	Fernand Picot	Valentin Huot	Belgium	Nicolas Barone	André Darrigade	André Darrigade
14	Roger Hassenforder	Jan Adriaensens	Fernand Picot	Valentin Huot	Belgium	Raymond Elena	André Darrigade	Pierre Beuffeuil
15	Joseph Thomin	Wout Wagtmans	Fernand Picot	Valentin Huot	Belgium	Joseph Thomin	André Darrigade	Jan Adriaensens
16	Jean Forestier	Wout Wagtmans	Fernand Picot	Valentin Huot	Belgium	Alves Barbosa	André Darrigade	no award
17	Nino Defilippis	Wout Wagtmans	Fernand Picot	Valentin Huot	Belgium	Charly Gaul	André Darrigade	Jean Brankart
18	Charly Gaul	Roger Walkowiak	Stan Ockers	Valentin Huot	Belgium	Roger Walkowiak	André Darrigade	Fernand Picot
19	Stan Ockers	Roger Walkowiak	Stan Ockers	Charly Gaul	Belgium	Stan Ockers	André Darrigade	Nino Defilippis
20	Miguel Bover	Roger Walkowiak	Stan Ockers	Charly Gaul	Belgium	Roger Hassenforder	André Darrigade	Wout Wagtmans
21	Roger Hassenforder	Roger Walkowiak	Stan Ockers	Charly Gaul	Belgium	Jan Adriaensens	André Darrigade	Jean Forestier
22	Gastone Nencini	Roger Walkowiak	Stan Ockers	Charly Gaul	Belgium	Claude Le Ber	André Darrigade	Raymond Elena
Final		Roger Walkowiak	Stan Ockers	Charly Gaul	Belgium	André Darrigade		Fernand Picot

== Final standings ==
=== General classification ===
Final general classification (1–10)
Rank	Rider	Team	Time
1	Roger Walkowiak (FRA)	North-East/Centre	124h 1' 16"
2	Gilbert Bauvin (FRA)	France	+ 1' 25"
3	Jan Adriaensens (BEL)	Belgium	+ 3' 44"
4	Federico Bahamontes (ESP)	Spain	+ 10' 14"
5	Nino Defilippis (ITA)	Italy	+ 10' 25"
6	Wout Wagtmans (NED)	Netherlands	+ 10' 59"
7	Nello Lauredi (FRA)	South-East	+ 14' 01"
8	Stan Ockers (BEL)	Belgium	+ 16' 52"
9	René Privat (FRA)	France	+ 22' 59"
10	Alves Barbosa (POR)	Luxembourg/Mixed	+ 26' 03"

Final general classification (11–88)
Rank	Rider	Team	Time
11	Gerrit Voorting (NED)	Netherlands	+ 27' 16"
12	Jean Forestier (FRA)	France	+ 30' 15"
13	Charly Gaul (LUX)	Luxembourg/Mixed	+ 32' 14"
14	Brian Robinson (GBR)	Luxembourg/Mixed	+ 33' 54"
15	Daan de Groot (NED)	Netherlands	+ 38' 40"
16	André Darrigade (FRA)	France	+ 39' 51"
17	Alex Close (BEL)	Belgium	+ 41' 47"
18	Fernand Picot (FRA)	West	+ 42' 28"
19	Jean Dotto (FRA)	South-East	+ 47' 19"
20	Alfred De Bruyne (BEL)	Belgium	+ 49' 53"
21	Gilbert Desmet (BEL)	Belgium	+ 50' 56"
22	Gastone Nencini (ITA)	Italy	+ 54' 56"
23	Bruno Monti (ITA)	Italy	+ 56' 58"
24	Pasquale Fornara (ITA)	Italy	+ 59' 58"
25	Maurice Quentin (FRA)	West	+ 1h 03' 53"
26	Arigo Padovan (ITA)	Italy	+ 1h 07' 25"
27	Agostino Coletto (ITA)	Italy	+ 1h 09' 13"
28	Jan Nolten (NED)	Netherlands	+ 1h 09' 27"
29	Jesús Loroño (ESP)	Spain	+ 1h 22' 24"
30	Leo van der Pluym (NED)	Netherlands	+ 1h 24' 10"
31	Pierre Beuffeuil (FRA)	South-West	+ 1h 24' 58"
32	Marcel Janssens (BEL)	Belgium	+ 1h 25' 15"
33	Raymond Impanis (BEL)	Belgium	+ 1h 25' 59"
34	Jean Malléjac (FRA)	France	+ 1h 26' 32"
35	Antonin Rolland (FRA)	France	+ 1h 29' 52"
36	Jean-Pierre Schmitz (LUX)	Luxembourg/Mixed	+ 1h 32' 57"
37	Joseph Thomin (FRA)	West	+ 1h 34' 02"
38	Nicolas Barone (FRA)	Île-de-France	+ 1h 39' 57"
39	Jean Brankart (BEL)	Belgium	+ 1h 41' 06"
40	Raymond Hoorelbeke (FRA)	Île-de-France	+ 1h 43' 41"
41	Angelo Conterno (ITA)	Italy	+ 1h 45' 55"
42	Pietro Giudici (ITA)	Italy	+ 1h 46' 58"
43	Mario Bertolo (ITA)	North-East/Centre	+ 1h 48' 51"
44	Francis Siguenza (FRA)	Île-de-France	+ 1h 49' 25"
45	Richard Van Genechten (BEL)	Belgium	+ 1h 51' 32"
46	Pierre Barbotin (FRA)	France	+ 1h 53' 38"
47	Max Schellenberg (SUI)	Switzerland	+ 1h 55' 40"
48	Alessandro Fantini (ITA)	Italy	+ 1h 57' 20"
49	Raphaël Géminiani (FRA)	France	+ 1h 57' 32"
50	Roger Hassenforder (FRA)	West	+ 1h 59' 20"
51	Marcel Ernzer (LUX)	Luxembourg/Mixed	+ 2h 06' 19"
52	Pierre Scribante (FRA)	North-East/Centre	+ 2h 10' 24"
53	Vincent Vitetta (FRA)	South-East	+ 2h 11' 01"
54	Louis Bergaud (FRA)	France	+ 2h 16' 36"
55	Pierino Baffi (ITA)	Italy	+ 2h 17' 54"
56	Louis Caput (FRA)	West	+ 2h 20' 53"
57	Jean Lerda (FRA)	South-East	+ 2h 22' 47"
58	René Marigil (ESP)	Spain	+ 2h 23' 57"
59	Claude Le Ber (FRA)	West	+ 2h 29' 28"
60	Jean-Claude Grèt (SUI)	Switzerland	+ 2h 29' 56"
61	Valentin Huot (FRA)	South-West	+ 2h 30' 45"
62	Remo Pianezzi (SUI)	Switzerland	+ 2h 31' 07"
63	Joseph Morvan (FRA)	West	+ 2h 32' 40"
64	Claude Frei (SUI)	Switzerland	+ 2h 34' 09"
65	Salvador Botella (ESP)	Spain	+ 2h 34' 28"
66	Alfred Tonello (FRA)	Île-de-France	+ 2h 38' 49"
67	Maurice Lampre (FRA)	South-West	+ 2h 47' 30"
68	Nicolas Morn (LUX)	Luxembourg/Mixed	+ 2h 47' 37"
69	Raymond Meyzenq (FRA)	South-East	+ 2h 48' 08"
70	Bernardo Ruiz (ESP)	Spain	+ 2h 50' 24"
71	Adolphe Deledda (FRA)	North-East/Centre	+ 2h 52' 37"
72	Jean Skerl (FRA)	Île-de-France	+ 2h 55' 51"
73	Robert Gibanel (FRA)	South-West	+ 2h 57' 18"
74	Miguel Bover (ESP)	Spain	+ 2h 59' 16"
75	Joseph Mirando (FRA)	South-East	+ 3h 02' 03"
76	Amand Audaire (FRA)	West	+ 3h 03' 33"
77	Carmelo Morales (ESP)	Spain	+ 3h 05' 19"
78	Albert Dolhats (FRA)	South-West	+ 3h 07' 01"
79	Marcel Guitard (FRA)	South-West	+ 3h 09' 12"
80	Camille Huyghe (FRA)	North-East/Centre	+ 3h 11' 07"
81	Jose Serra (ESP)	Spain	+ 3h 16' 56"
82	Roger Chupin (FRA)	North-East/Centre	+ 3h 19' 07"
83	Willy Kemp (LUX)	Luxembourg/Mixed	+ 3h 23' 06"
84	Tino Sabbadini (FRA)	South-West	+ 3h 38' 29"
85	Philippe Agut (FRA)	South-West	+ 3h 52' 47"
86	Jef Lahaye (NED)	Netherlands	+ 4h 02' 22"
87	Werner Arnold (SUI)	Switzerland	+ 4h 07' 53"
88	Roger Chaussabel (FRA)	South-East	+ 4h 10' 18"

=== Points classification ===
Final points classification (1–10)
Rank	Rider	Team	Points
1	Stan Ockers (BEL)	Belgium	280
2	Fernand Picot (FRA)	West	464
3	Gerrit Voorting (NED)	Netherlands	465
4	André Darrigade (FRA)	France	489
5	Gilbert Bauvin (FRA)	France	502
6	Daan de Groot (NED)	Netherlands	546
7	Gilbert Desmet (BEL)	Belgium	578
8	Nino Defilippis (ITA)	Italy	596
9	Nello Lauredi (FRA)	South-East	624
10	Alves Barbosa (POR)	Luxembourg/Mixed	628

=== Mountains classification ===
Final mountains classification (1–9)
Rank	Rider	Team	Points
1	Charly Gaul (LUX)	Luxembourg/Mixed	71
2	Federico Bahamontes (ESP)	Spain	67
3	Valentin Huot (FRA)	South-West	65
4	Stan Ockers (BEL)	Belgium	55
5	Richard Van Genechten (BEL)	Belgium	30
6	Roger Walkowiak (FRA)	North-East/Centre	27
7	Jean-Pierre Schmitz (LUX)	Luxembourg/Mixed	15
8	Raymond Meyzenq (FRA)	South-East	14
9	Jean Forestier (FRA)	France	13
9	Jan Adriaensens (BEL)	Belgium	13
9	Bernardo Ruiz (ESP)	Spain	13

=== Team classification ===
Final team classification
Rank	Team	Time
1	Belgium	369h 47' 42"
2	Italy	+ 1h 04' 26"
3	Netherlands	+ 1h 13' 11"
4	France	+ 1h 24' 08"
5	West	+ 1h 44' 12"
6	South-East	+ 1h 57' 39"
7	Spain	+ 3h 05' 35"
8	Luxembourg/Mixed	+ 3h 12' 59"
9	North-East/Centre	+ 3h 55' 25"
10	South-East	+ 4h 43' 10"
11	Île-de-France	+ 5h 33' 50"
12	Switzerland	+ 6h 51' 33"

=== Combativity classification ===
Final combativity classification (1–10)
Rank	Rider	Team	Points
1	André Darrigade (FRA)	France	175
2	Roger Hassenforder (FRA)	West	142
3	Charly Gaul (LUX)	Luxembourg/Mixed	119
4	Nino Defilippis (ITA)	Italy	118
5	Nicolas Barone (FRA)	Île-de-France	106
6	Claude Le Ber (FRA)	West	100
7	Roger Walkowiak (FRA)	North-East/Centre	98
8	Raymond Elena (FRA)	South-East	92
9	Nello Lauredi (FRA)	South-East	83
10	Pierre Barbotin (FRA)	France	77

== Aftermath ==
The cycling fans had not been happy to see unknown Walkowiak win the race, and he was not cheered for when the race finished in the Parc des Princes. Walkowiak was considered an unworthy winner, and never again was able to repeat such a win. His name entered the French language in the phrase "á la Walko", which means "won by an undeserving or unknown rider". The press gave many reasons for Walkowiak's victory: the France national team had had internal problems, Gaul and Bahamontes had been occupied with the mountains classification and Ockers with the team classification. Not all considered him unworthy; Five-time Tour winner Bernard Hinault praised his win saying: There are people who say that Walkowiak should not have won the Tour. They should have been on that Tour! He took the jersey, he lost it and he regained it. He was not a thief. The Tour is not a gift.

Walkowiak was unhappy about how the people reacted to his Tour win, and for many years did not want to discuss it.

The French team manager Marcel Bidot later criticized Darrigade for not helping Bauvin in the last stages; he thought that with the help of Darrigade, Bauvin might have been able to win back the 85 seconds on Walkowiak and win the race.

This was the final Tour for Belgian rider Stan Ockers, who died in a tragic accident during a track race just a few months after this Tour ended. Of the ten Tours held after World War II, Ockers had entered eight, finished all in the top ten each time except in 1948 when he finished 11th. Ockers had won the points classification in 1955 and 1956.

== Bibliography ==
- Augendre, Jacques (2016). Guide historique [Historical guide] (PDF) (in French). Paris: Amaury Sport Organisation. Archived (PDF) from the original on 17 August 2016.
- Desforges, Jacques (2006). Charly Gaul, grimpeur ailé (in French). Paris: Editions Publibook. ISBN 978-2-7483-2537-9.
- McGann, Bill; McGann, Carol (2006). The Story of the Tour de France: 1903–1964. Vol. 1. Indianapolis, IN: Dog Ear Publishing. ISBN 978-1-59858-180-5.
- Nauright, John; Parrish, Charles (2012). Sports Around the World: History, Culture, and Practice. Vol. 2. Santa Barbara, CA: ABC-CLIO. ISBN 978-1-59884-300-2.
- van den Akker, Pieter (2018). Tour de France Rules and Statistics: 1903–2018. Self-published. ISBN 978-1-79398-080-9.
