= Grand Prix de Monaco (cycling) =

Race details
- Date: February
- Region: Monaco
- English name: Grand Prix of Monaco
- Discipline: Road
- Type: One-day race

History
- First edition: 1949
- Editions: 35
- Final edition: 1983
- First winner: Émile Rol (FRA)
- Most wins: Frans Verbeeck (BEL) (3 wins)
- Final winner: Kim Andersen (DEN)

The Grand Prix de Monaco was a single-day road cycling race held annually in Monaco from 1949 to 1983.

== Winners ==
Year	Winner	Second	Third
1949	(France) Émile Rol	(France) Amédée Rolland	(France) Robert Vercellone
1950	(France) Antoine Giauna	(France) Théo Borri	(France) Jean Dotto
1950	(France) Georges Galliano	(France) Antoine Giauna	(France) Amedée Rolland
1951	(France) Jean Dotto	(France) Joseph Mirando	(France) André Remond
1952	(France) Jean Dotto	(France) Pierre Molineris	(Spain) José Gil Sole
1953	(France) Francis Siguenza	(France) Charles Gregorini	(France) André Geneste
1954	(France) Francis Anastasi	(France) Jacques Dupont	(France) Gilbert Bauvin
1955	(France) André Payan	(France) Armand Di Caro	(France) Fernand Valentini
1956	(France) Francis Anastasi	(France) Joseph Mirando	(France) Raymond Elena
1957	(France) Gilbert Bauvin	(France) Louis Bobet	(Republic of Ireland) Seamus Elliott
1958	(Belgium) Germain Derijcke	(France) Raphaël Géminiani	(France) Jean Bobet
1959	(France) Joseph Groussard	(Italy) Nino Defilippis	(France) Alfred Gratton
1960	(France) Jean Graczyk	(Italy) Carlo Brugnami	(France) Claude Colette
1961	(Netherlands) Jo de Roo	(Italy) Angelo Conterno	(France) Gilbert Salvador
1962	(Belgium) Willy Vanden Berghen	(France) André Cloarec	(France) Michel Nedelec
1963	(France) Jean Graczyk	(France) François Hamon	(France) Gilbert Salvador
1964	(Italy) Italo Zilioli	(France) Joseph Groussard	(France) Gilbert Bellone
1965	(Belgium) Frans Melckenbeeck	(Italy) Carmine Preziosi	(Italy) Vito Taccone
1966	(Italy) Gianni Motta	(Italy) Vittorio Adorni	(France) Raymond Poulidor
1967	(Italy) Luciano Armani	(France) Francis Campaner	(France) Jean-Louis Bodin
1968	(Belgium) Roger Swerts	(France) Fernand Etter	(France) Cyrille Guimard
1969	(France) Jacques Cadiou	(France) Pierre Matignon	(France) Guy Gillet
1970	(Italy) Wladimiro Panizza	(Italy) Gianfranco Bianchin	(Italy) Constantino Conti
1971	(Belgium) Frans Verbeeck	(Belgium) Eddy Merckx	(Italy) Enrico Paolini
1972	(Belgium) Frans Verbeeck	(Belgium) Roger Rosiers	(Belgium) Victor Van Schil
1973	(Belgium) Roger De Vlaeminck	(France) Raymond Delisle	(United Kingdom) Derek Harrison
1974	(Belgium) Ferdinand Bracke	(France) Raymond Delisle	(Belgium) José De Cauwer
1975	(Italy) Francesco Moser	(Italy) Wladimiro Panizza	(Netherlands) Gerrie Knetemann
1976	(Belgium) Frans Verbeeck	(France) Jean-Pierre Danguillaume	(France) Raymond Delisle
1977	No race		
1978	(Netherlands) Jan Raas	(Netherlands) Joop Zoetemelk	(Germany) Klaus-Peter Thaler
1979	(France) Jacques Esclassan	(United Kingdom) Paul Sherwen	(France) René Bittinger
1980	(France) Claude Vincendeau	(France) Alain Meslet	(France) Hubert Arbès
1981	(France) Jean-René Bernaudeau	(Republic of Ireland) Stephen Roche	(France) Bernard Bourreau
1982	(France) Pierre-Raymond Villemiane	(France) Serge Beucherie	(France) Pierre-Henri Menthéour
1983	(Denmark) Kim Andersen	(Republic of Ireland) Sean Kelly	(Belgium) Eric Vanderaerden
