= 1956 Critérium du Dauphiné Libéré =

Race details
- Dates: 8–17 June 1956
- Stages: 9
- Distance: 1,934 km (1,202 mi)
- Winning time: 51h 46' 41"

Results
	Winner	Alex Close (BEL)
	Second	Antonin Rolland (FRA)
	Third	Fernand Picot (FRA)

The 1956 Critérium du Dauphiné Libéré was the tenth edition of the Critérium du Dauphiné Libéré cycle race and was held from 8 June to 17 June 1956. The race started and finished in Grenoble. The race was won by Alex Close.

== General classification ==
Final general classification

Rank	Rider	Time
1	Alex Close (BEL)	51h 46' 41"
2	Antonin Rolland (FRA)	+ 4' 11"
3	Fernand Picot (FRA)	+ 5' 13"
4	Mario Bertolo (FRA)	+ 6' 43"
5	René Privat (FRA)	+ 7' 34"
6	Pierre Gouget (FRA)	+ 8' 00"
7	Pierre Barbotin (FRA)	+ 8' 07"
8	Vito Favero (ITA)	+ 9' 55"
9	Stan Ockers (BEL)	+ 12' 02"
10	Pierre Scribante (FRA)	+ 12' 18"
