= Grand Prix de Saint-Raphaël =

Cycling race in France

Race details
- Region: Var, France
- Discipline: Road
- Type: One-day race

History
- First edition: 1953
- Editions: 24
- Final edition: 1984
- First winner: Georges Decaux (FRA)
- Most wins: Francis Anastasi (FRA); Robert Lelangue (BEL); (2 wins)
- Final winner: Pascal Jules (FRA)

The Grand Prix de Saint-Raphaël was a single-day road cycling race held in the department of Var, France between 1953 and 1984.

== Winners ==
Year	Winner	Second	Third
1953	(France) Georges Decaux	(France) Raymond Guégan (Denmark) Kaj Allan Olsen	
1954	(France) Francis Anastasi	(France) Pierre Molineris	(Spain) Santiago Mostajo Gutierrez
1955	(France) Louis Bobet	(France) Pierre Molineris	(Belgium) Robert Vanderstockt
1956	(France) Jacques Dupont	(Republic of Ireland) Seamus Elliott	(France) Jean Stablinski
1957	(France) Raymond Elena	(France) Jean Bobet	(France) Louis Caput
1958	(France) Joseph Groussard	(France) Fernand Picot	(Republic of Ireland) Seamus Elliott
1959	(France) Francis Anastasi	(Belgium) Julien Schepens	(Belgium) Pierre Machiels
1961	(Belgium) Willy Haelterman	(France) Joseph Groussard	(Italy) Fernando Brandolini
1962	(France) Gilbert Salvador	(France) André Cloarec	(France) Jean Bourlès
1963	(Belgium) Robert Lelangue	(Belgium) Robert De Middeleir	(France) Michel Bocquillon
1964	(Belgium) Robert Lelangue	(Belgium) Frans Melckenbeeck	(France) Alain Vera
1965	(Republic of Ireland) Seamus Elliott	(Italy) Romeo Venturelli	(France) Paul Lemeteyer
1966	(France) Fernand Etter	(Italy) Carmine Preziosi	(Italy) Graziano Battistini
1967	(France) Jean Jourden	(Italy) Michele Dancelli	(France) Jacques Cadiou
1968	(France) Claude Guyot	(France) Jacques Cadiou	(Belgium) Edward Sels
1969	(Germany) Winfried Bölke	(France) Jacques Cadiou	(Czechoslovakia) Jiří Daler
1970	(France) Jacques Cadiou	(France) Charly Grosskost	(France) Roger Pingeon
1971	(Italy) Michele Dancelli	(France) Daniel Ducreux	(France) Joël Bernard
1972	(France) Serge Lapébie	(France) Alain Van Lancker	(France) Daniel Rebillard
1978	(Belgium) Alfons De Bal	(Belgium) Walter Godefroot	(Italy) Sergio Parsani
1979	(Belgium) Roger Rosiers	(United Kingdom) Graham Jones	(France) Didier Van Vlaslaer
1980	(Netherlands) Jos Lammertink	(Belgium) Jean-Luc Vandenbroucke	(Netherlands) Johan van der Meer
1981	(France) Alain Bondue	(France) Bernard Osmont	(France) Dominique Arnaud
1984	(France) Pascal Jules	(France) Alain Bondue	(France) Jean-Louis Gauthier
