= Meyzenq =

Meyzenq is a French surname. Notable people with the surname include:

- Guillaume Meyzenq (fl. 2021), French businessman
- Raymond Meyzenq (1935–2008), French cyclist
