= Genoa–Nice =

Race details
- Date: Late February/early March
- Region: Italy, France
- Discipline: Road
- Competition: Super Prestige Pernod
- Type: Single-day race

History
- First edition: 1910
- Final edition: 1975
- First winner: Omer Beaugendre (FRA)
- Most wins: 2 wins: Cyrille Guimard (FRA); Raoul Lesueur (FRA)
- Final winner: Raymond Delisle (FRA)

Genoa–Nice was a professional cycle race held as a single-day race between Genoa, Italy and Nice, France. It was first held in 1910 and held for the final time in 1975. In 1961 and 1962 it was part of the Super Prestige Pernod series. In 1958, 1960, 1962, 1964, 1967 and 1973 it was held in the opposite direction, from Nice to Genoa.

== Winners ==
Year	Country	Rider	Team
1910	France	Omer Beaugendre	
1911–1913	No race		
1914	Italy	Guido Vercellino	
1915–1920	No race		
1921	Italy	Costante Girardengo	
1922–1934	No race		
1935	France	Raoul Lesueur	
1936	Italy	Pietro Rimoldi	
1937	France	Raoul Lesueur	
1938	France	Amédée Rolland	
1939–1952	No race		
1953	France	Charles Gregorini	
1954	France	Jesus Martinez	
1955	France	René Privat	
1956	France	Jean Bobet	
1957	France	Louison Bobet	
1958	Italy	Nino Defilippis	
1959	France	Joseph Groussard	
1960	France	Jean Stablinski	
1961	France	Fernand Picot	
1962	Italy	Antonio Bailetti	
1963	West Germany	Rudi Altig	
1964	France	André Darrigade	
1965	Italy	Carmine Preziosi	
1966	France	Lucien Aimar	
1967	Netherlands	Jan Janssen	
1968	France	Cyrille Guimard	
1969	France	Cyrille Guimard	
1970	Italy	Luciano Armani	
1971	Netherlands	Gerard Vianen	
1972	No race		
1973	Italy	Marino Basso	
1974	No race		
1975	France	Raymond Delisle	
