= Roger Walkowiak =

French cyclist

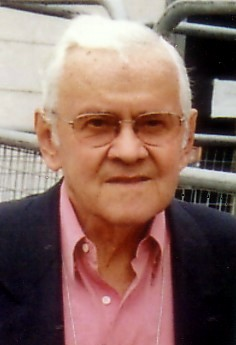
- Walkowiak in 2008

Personal information
- Full name: Roger Walkowiak
- Nickname: Walko
- Born: 2 March 1927 Montluçon, France
- Died: 6 February 2017 (aged 89) Vichy, France

Cycling career
- Sport: Cycling
- Discipline: Road
- Role: Rider
- Rider type: All-rounder

Professional teams
- 1951–1952: Gitane–Hutchinson
- 1953–1954: Peugeot–Dunlop
- 1955: Gitane–Hutchinson
- 1956: Saint-Raphaël–R. Geminiani–Dunlop
- 1957–1959: Peugeot–BP–Dunlop
- 1960: Saint-Raphaël–R. Geminiani–Dunlop

Major wins
- Grand Tours Tour de France General classification (1956) Vuelta a España 2 individual stages (1956, 1957)

Roger Walkowiak (pronounced [ʁɔ.ʒe wal.kov.jak]; 2 March 1927 – 6 February 2017) was a French road bicycle racer who won the 1956 Tour de France. He was a professional rider from 1950 until 1960. He died on 6 February 2017 at the age of 89.

== Early life ==
Walkowiak grew up in Montluçon in central France. His father emigrated to France from Lublin in Poland. He began racing after World War II as he was unable to find a job as a metalworker.

== The 1956 Tour de France ==
From 1930 the Tour de France had been contested by national and regional teams. Roger Walkowiak was recruited for the French regional Nord-Est-Centre team, representing the North-east and Centre of France, despite coming from Montluçon in the South-West. He was the only rider available at late notice to replace an original team member, Gilbert Bauvin, who had been promoted to France's main team.

Walkowiak escaped on the 7th stage from Lorient to Angers in a group of 31 riders that won that day by over 18 minutes. The advantage was enough to give him the yellow jersey of the overall race lead. At this stage the race's stars did not consider this 'insignificant' rider to be a risk.

Walkowiak lost the jersey to Gerrit Voorting at the end of stage 10 which took some of the pressure off his shoulders. In the Pyrenees Belgium's Jan Adriaensens took the lead. At Aix-en-Provence (stage 15) Dutchman Wout Wagtmans took the jersey, but Walkowiak was still well placed.

On the Alpine stage 18 (Turin–Grenoble), the climbing specialist Charly Gaul (Luxembourg), who had lost a lot of time in the flat stages, attacked to try and win the King of the Mountains competition (which he eventually did, beating Federico Bahamontes). Gaul's attack split the field; Wagtmans lost 16 minutes and Walkowiak took back the yellow jersey after losing only 8 minutes to Gaul on the day.

For the last four stages, Walkowiak defended his lead, reaching the finish at the Parc des Princes on 28 July just over a minute ahead of Gilbert Bauvin. The race was won in a then record speed of 36.268 km/h.

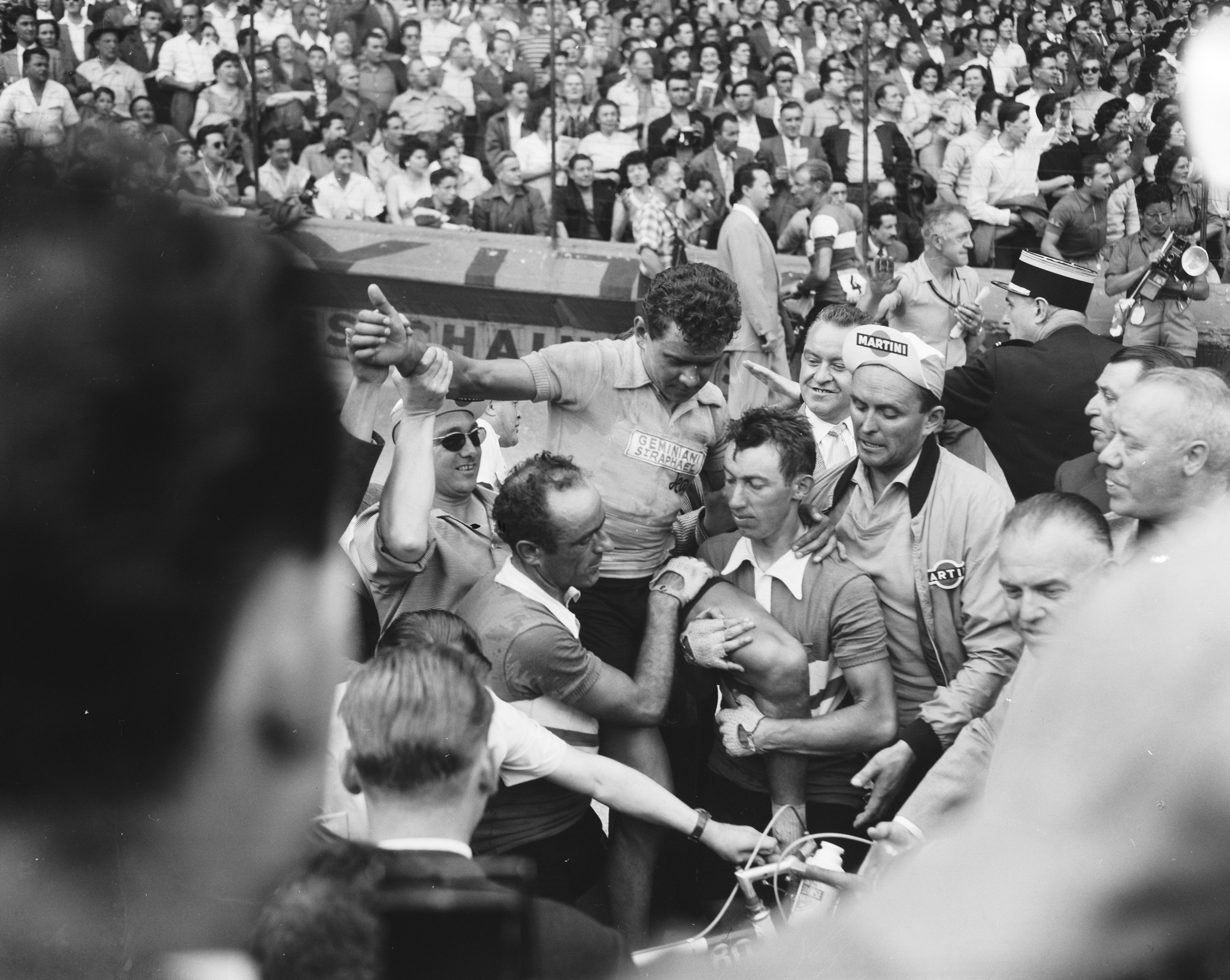
Walkowiak winner at the Parc des Princes

Walkowiak's win was poorly received by the professional peloton and the public. "The applause sounded like a lamentation", the organiser, Jacques Goddet, wrote in L'Équipe. The crowd was disappointed that the race had been won by an unknown and not by the rising star Jacques Anquetil, who had decided against riding. Walkowiak became the second rider to win the Tour without winning on any of the individual day's stages that make up the race.

Nevertheless, Jacques Goddet always considered Walkowiak his favourite winner, calling him an all-rounder who had used his legs to win and his head to secure his winning position. France, however, remained unimpressed and for many years, Walkowiak's name passed into the language, so that do something "à la Walko" meant to succeed unexpectedly or without panache.

That reaction depressed Walkowiak. He rode the Tour the following year, but slipped from top of the field to almost the bottom. He rode the Tour of Spain, the Vuelta a España, in 1957 and won a stage, raced a further two years and then retired to run a bar in the area from which he had left, as an unknown, to win the Tour de France. When even his customers teased him about winning the Tour, he lost confidence still more and went back to working on a lathe in the car factory in Montluçon that had employed him as a young man.

It took many years to persuade Walkowiak that there was merit in what he had done and, though he lived quietly in south-west France, he did talk about the day he became the unknown who won the world's greatest cycling race. After the death of Ferdi Kübler on 29 December 2016, Walkowiak was for a short while the oldest Tour de France winner still alive. Following Walkowiak's death in February 2017, the oldest living Tour winner was Federico Bahamontes, who won the Tour in 1959.

== Career achievements ==
=== Major results ===
1951
3rd Tour de Dordogne
1952
2nd Tour de l'Ouest
3rd G.P de Vals-les-Bains
1953
2nd Paris-Côte d'Azur
1954
3rd Tour de l'Ouest
1955
2nd Critérium du Dauphiné Libéré
1956
1st Overall Tour de France
1st Stage 13 Vuelta a España
3rd Circuit du Cher
1957
1st Stage 8 Vuelta a España
1958
2nd Boucles du Bas-Limousin
3rd Tour du Sud-Est
1960
3rd Tour de l'Aude
3rd Circuit d'Auvergne

=== Grand Tour results timeline ===
	1951	1952	1953	1954	1955	1956	1957	1958
Giro d'Italia	DNE	DNE	DNE	DNE	DNE	DNE	DNE	DNE
Stages won	—	—	—	—	—	—	—	—
Mountains classification	—	—	—	—	—	—	—	—
Points classification	N/A	N/A	N/A	N/A	N/A	N/A	N/A	N/A
Tour de France	57	DNE	47	DNE	DNF-11	1	DNF-18	75
Stages won	0	—	0	—	0	0	0	0
Mountains classification	NR	—	NR	—	NR	6	NR	NR
Points classification	N/A	N/A	NR	—	NR	16	NR	NR
Vuelta a España	N/A	N/A	N/A	DNE	DNE	DNF	15	DNE
Stages won	N/A	N/A	N/A	—	—	1	1	—
Mountains classification	N/A	N/A	N/A	N/A	N/A	N/A	N/A	N/A
Points classification	N/A	N/A	N/A	N/A	N/A	N/A	N/A	N/A

Legend
1	Winner
2–3	Top three-finish
4–10	Top ten-finish
11–	Other finish
DNE	Did not enter
DNF-x	Did not finish (retired on stage x)
DNS-x	Did not start (not started on stage x)
HD-x	Finished outside time limit (occurred on stage x)
DSQ	Disqualified
N/A	Race/classification not held
NR	Not ranked in this classification

== Tour de France ==
- 1951 – 57th
- 1953 – 47th
- 1956 – 1st
- 1958 – 75th

== Bibliography ==
- Woodland, L., Yellow Jersey Companion to the Tour De France, Yellow Jersey Press, London 2003 ISBN 0-224-06318-9
- The Tour De France: The Official Centennial 1903 – 2003, Weidenfeld Nicolson, London 2004 ISBN 1-84188-239-9
