= Camille Huyghe =

French cyclist (1930–2023)

Personal information
- Born: 16 February 1930 Auxi-le-Château, France
- Died: 21 December 2023 (aged 93)

Cycling career
- Sport: Cycling
- Role: Rider

Camille Huyghe (16 February 1930 – 21 December 2023) was a French racing cyclist. He rode in the 1956 Tour de France. Huyghe died on 21 December 2023, at the age of 93.
