= Claude Frei =

Swiss cyclist

Personal information
- Born: 3 April 1933 (age 93) Nice, France

Cycling career
- Sport: Cycling
- Role: Rider

Claude Frei (born 3 April 1933, Nice, France; died 28 November 2024, Winterthur, Switzerland) was a Swiss former professional racing cyclist. He rode in the 1956 Tour de France and Tour de Suisse for Swiss Team Allegro.
