= Jean Lerda =

French cyclist (1929–2016)

Personal information
- Born: 28 September 1929 Allauch, France
- Died: 22 December 2016 (aged 87) La Fare-les-Oliviers, France

Cycling career
- Sport: Cycling
- Role: Rider

Jean Lerda (28 September 1929 – 22 December 2016) was a French professional racing cyclist. He rode the 1956 Tour de France. Lerda died in La Fare-les-Oliviers on 22 December 2016, at the age of 87.
