= Raymond Meyzenq =

French cyclist

Personal information
- Born: 29 January 1935 Veynes, France
- Died: 28 November 2008 (aged 73)

Cycling career
- Sport: Cycling
- Role: Rider

Raymond Meyzenq (29 January 1935 – 28 November 2008) was a French professional racing cyclist. He rode in the 1956 Tour de France.
