= Alves Barbosa =

Portuguese cyclist

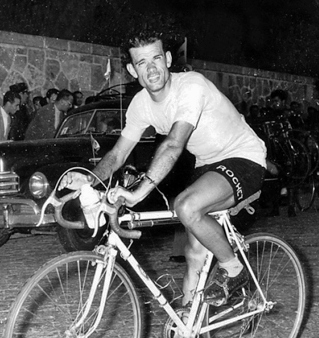

Personal information
- Full name: António da Silva Alves Barbosa
- Born: 24 December 1931 Figueira da Foz, Portugal
- Died: 29 September 2018 (aged 86) Figueira da Foz, Portugal

Cycling career
- Sport: Cycling
- Discipline: Road
- Role: Rider

António da Silva Alves Barbosa (24 December 1931 – 29 September 2018), commonly known as Alves Barbosa, was a Portuguese professional road cyclist. He won the Volta a Portugal in 1951, 1956 and 1958, placing third in 1955, and rode the Tour de France from 1956 until 1958 and again in 1960. He also won a stage of the 1961 Vuelta a España.

== Major results ==
1950
1st Junior National Road Race Championships
1951
1st Overall Volta a Portugal

1st Prologue & Stages 2 & 3

1952
1st Prova Ciclística 9 de Julho
1st Stage 9 Tour du Maroc
1954
1st National Road Race Championships
1955
1st Prova Ciclística 9 de Julho
1st Stages 4, 7, 8b, 9, 10 & 12a Volta a Portugal
1956
1st National Road Race Championships
1st Overall Volta a Portugal

1st Stages 2a, 4a, 7, 8b, 9b, 10b, 12, 14 & 15

8th Overall Four Days of Dunkirk
10th Overall Tour de France
1958
1st Overall Volta a Portugal

1st Stages 1b, 8, 12, 17, 21, 22a & 23

1959
1st Stages 5a, 5b (TTT), 13, 14, 15a, 16a & 19 Volta a Portugal
1960
1st Stages 1 & 6 Tour du Maroc
9th Overall Vuelta a Andalucía
1961
1st Stage 9 Vuelta a España
8th Overall Vuelta a Andalucía

1st Stage 4
