= Pierre Scribante =

French cyclist

Personal information
- Born: 21 March 1931 Lyon, France
- Died: 13 November 2013 (aged 82)

Cycling career
- Sport: Cycling
- Role: Rider

Pierre Scribante (21 March 1931 – 13 November 2013) was a French professional racing cyclist. He rode in the 1956 Tour de France.
