= Roger Hassenforder =

French cyclist (1930–2021)

Personal information
- Full name: Roger Hassenforder
- Nickname: Boute-en-train
- Born: 23 July 1930 Sausheim, France
- Died: 3 January 2021 (aged 90) Colmar, France

Cycling career
- Sport: Cycling
- Discipline: Road
- Role: Rider

Professional teams
- 1952: Bertin-d'Alessandro
- 1953: Mercier-Hutchinson
- 1953-1954: La Perle - Hutchinson
- 1955-1960: Saint Raphael-Geminiani
- 1961: Alcyon - Leroux
- 1962-1964: Bertin - Porter 39 - Milremo
- 1965: individual

Major wins
- 8 stages Tour de France

Roger Hassenforder (23 July 1930 in Sausheim – 3 January 2021 in Colmar) was a French professional racing cyclist from Alsace.

== Biography ==
Hassenforder was a professional cyclist from 1952 to 1965. He was known as the joker of the pack, earning him the nickname "boute-en-train" ("life of the party"). He was known for his interviews during the course. His major victories as cyclist were in the Tour de France, but he did not win much in other races. His best years were 1955-1959, when he won eight stages in the Tour and wore the yellow jersey for four days.

After his cycling career ended, he opened a restaurant in Kaysersberg, that was a favourite meeting place for cycling fans in the 1960s, and is still run by the Hassenforder family.

== Major results ==
1953
Tour de France:

did not finish
4 days in the yellow jersey

1st stage Critérium du Dauphiné Libéré
Tour du Sud-Est (and 1st stage)
1954
Tour de France:

did not finish

Critérium International
GP des Alliés
Ronde d'Aix-en-Provence
1955
Tour de France:

did not finish
winner 5th stage

Tour de Picardie
1956
Tour de France:

50th place
winner stage 4B
winner stage 9
winner stage 14
winner stage 21

Alès
Critérium International
GP de l'Echo d'Oran
1957
Tour de France:

did not finish
winner stage 7
winner stage 14

Miniac-Morvan (FRA)
5th stage Vuelta a España
1958
Critérium International
1959
Tour de France:

did not finish
winner stage 7

== Sources ==
- Jean-Paul Olivier: Roger Hassenforder, Collection la Véridique Histoire, Paris 1999.
