= Jean-Pierre Schmitz =

Luxemburgian cyclist

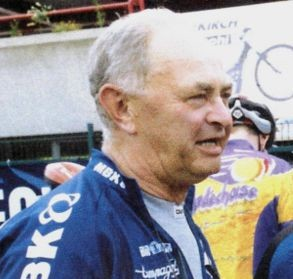

Personal information
- Full name: Jean-Pierre Schmitz
- Born: 15 February 1932 Huldange, Luxembourg
- Died: 14 November 2017 (aged 85)

Cycling career
- Sport: Cycling
- Discipline: Road
- Role: Rider

Major wins
- GP du Midi Libre (1957)
Medal record
Representing Luxembourg
Men's road bicycle racing
World Championships
Silver medal – second place	1955 Frascati	Road race

Jean-Pierre Schmitz (Jempy Schmitz) (15 February 1932 – 14 November 2017) was a Luxembourgish professional road bicycle racer. Schmitz won the Midi Libre in 1957, the Tour de Luxembourg in 1954 and 1958, and one stage in the 1956 Tour de France. In 1955, Schmitz was second in the World Road race championship after Stan Ockers.

Schmitz died on 14 November 2017 at the age of 85.

== Major results ==
1952
Luxembourg national amateur road race championship
1954
Tour de Luxembourg
1955
Chalon-sur-Saône
1956
Tour de France, Winner stage 12
1957
Grand Prix du Midi Libre
1958
Luxembourg national road race championship and Tour de Luxembourg
