= Nino Defilippis =

Italian cyclist

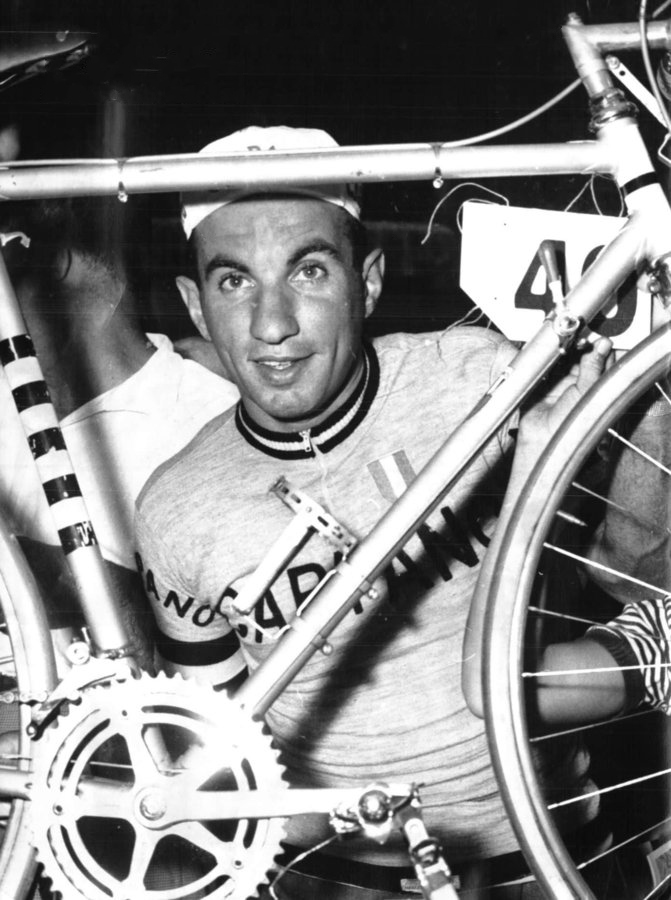
- Defilippis in c. 1958–63

Personal information
- Full name: Nino Defilippis
- Born: 21 March 1932 Turin, Italy
- Died: 13 July 2010 (aged 78) Turin, Italy

Cycling career
- Sport: Cycling
- Current team: Retired
- Discipline: Road
- Role: Rider

Professional teams
- 1952–1953: Legnano
- 1954–1955: Torpado
- 1956–1957: Bianchi-Pirelli
- 1958–1963: Carpano
- 1964: IBAC

Major wins
- Italian National Road Race (1956, 1958); Giro di Lombardia (1958); Giro d'Italia, 9 stages Tour de France, 7 stages Vuelta a España, 2 stages Mountains classification (1956)
Medal record
Representing Italy
Men's road bicycle racing
World Championships
Silver medal – second place	1961 Berne	Elite Men's Road Race

Nino Defilippis (21 March 1932 – 13 July 2010) was an Italian road bicycle racer who won the Giro di Lombardia in 1958, as well as nine stages at the Giro d'Italia, seven stages at the Tour de France and two stages at the Vuelta a España. He also won the mountains classification at the 1956 Vuelta a España and the Italian National Road Race Championship in 1956 and 1958.

== Major results ==
1952
1st Trofeo Baracchi
1st Stage 17 Giro d'Italia
2nd Giro di Lombardia
2nd Giro di Campania
4th Giro dell'Appennino

1953
1st Tre Valli Varesine
2nd National Road Championships, Road Race
3rd Trofeo Baracchi
3rd Grottarossa Criterium, Italy
10th Coppa Bernocchi

1954
1st Giro del Piemonte
1st Giro dell'Emilia
1st Stage 3 Giro d'Italia
4th Coppa Bernocchi
5th Trofeo Baracchi

1955
1st Giro dell'Emilia
1st Cuneo Criterium
1st Omegna Criterium
1st Stages 3 & 6 Giro d'Italia
2nd Overall Roma–Napoli–Roma
2nd Cagliari Criterium
2nd Sassari Criterium
4th Giro dell'Appennino
4th Coppa Bernocchi
6th Trofeo Baracchi

1956
1st Mountains classification Vuelta a España

1st Stage 15

2nd Giro del Lazio
2nd Circuito di Lodi
2nd Omegna Criterium
5th Overall Tour de France

1st Stages 11, 13 & 17

1957
2nd Omegna Criterium
3rd Florenville Criterium
7th Overall Tour de France

1st Stages 13 & 17

1958
1st Overall Giro del Lazio

1st Stages 1a & 1b

1st Giro di Lombardia
1st Grand Prix d'Antibes
1st Giro del Piemonte
1st Nice–Genova
1st Maggiora Criterium I
1st Stage 2 Giro di Sardegna
1st Stage 4 Paris–Nice
1st Stages 9 & 11 Giro d'Italia
1st Stage 1 Tour de Suisse
1st Stages 1, 6 & 7 Tour de l'Ouest
2nd National Road Championships, Road Race
2nd Roccabianca Criterium
3rd GP Industria e Commercio di Prato
3rd Cesano Maderno Criterium
3rd Maggiora Criterium II

1959
1st Stage 12 Giro d'Italia
1st Stage 1 Giro di Sardegna
2nd GP Monaco

1960
1st National Road Championships, Road Race
1st Giro della Toscana
1st Stages 3 & 8 Tour de France
1st Stage 6 Giro di Sardegna
1st Stage 4a Menton–Roma
2nd GP Faema
2nd Trofeo Longines
2nd Morazzone Criterium
3rd Giro dell'Appennino
3rd Giro del Lazio
10th Coppa Bernocchi

1961
1st Giro del Veneto
1st Coppa Brescia
1st GP de Cannes
1st Monaco Criterium
1st Gonzaga Criterium
2nd UCI Road World Championships, Road Race
2nd Tour of Flanders
7th Tre Valli Varesine
10th Giro d'Italia

1st Stage 6

10th Giro di Campania

1962
1st National Road Championships, Road Race
1st Giro del Lazio
1st München–Zürich
1st Solesino Criterium
1st Stage 3 Vuelta a España
2nd Coppa Bernocchi
2nd GP Monaco
3rd Overall Giro d'Italia
3rd Overall Giro di Sardegna
6th Cagliari–Sassari
7th Giro della Toscana
10th Giro del Piemonte

1963
1st Stage 7 Giro d'Italia

1964
1st Stage 15 Giro d'Italia
2nd Memorial Fausto Coppi
