= Miguel Bover =

Spanish cyclist (1928–1966)

Personal information
- Full name: Miguel Bover Pons
- Born: 14 February 1928 Palma, Spain
- Died: 25 January 1966 (aged 37)

Cycling career
- Sport: Cycling
- Discipline: Road
- Role: Rider

Major wins
- Vuelta a Andalucía (1956)

Miguel Bover Pons (14 February 1928 in Palma de Mallorca – 25 January 1966 in Palma de Mallorca) was a Spanish professional road bicycle racer. Miguel Bover Pons was the son of 1920 Spanish road race champion Miguel Bover Salom.

== Major results ==
1949
Trofeo Masferrer
1956
GP Pascuas
Trofeo Jaumendreu
Vuelta a Andalucía
Tour de France:

Winner stage 20

1957
GP Martorell
1962
Six days of Madrid (with Miguel Poblet)
