= Fernand Picot =

French cyclist

Personal information
- Born: 10 May 1930 Pontivy, France
- Died: 22 October 2017 (aged 87) Pontivy, France

Cycling career
- Sport: Cycling
- Discipline: Road
- Role: Rider

Amateur teams
- 1948–1954: VC Pontivy
- 1953–1954: Arrow

Professional teams
- 1955: Urago–D'Alessandro
- 1956–1961: Mercier–BP–Hutchinson
- 1962: Peugeot–BP–Dunlop
- 1963: Bertin–Porter 39–Milremo
- 1964–1965: Margnat–Paloma–Dunlop

Fernand Picot (French pronunciation: [fɛʁnɑ̃ piko]; 10 May 1930 – 22 October 2017) was a French professional racing cyclist. He rode in eight editions of the Tour de France.

== Major results ==
1951
2nd Boucles de l'Aulne
5th Overall Tour de l'Ouest
1953
1st Stages 5 & 6 Route de France
1954
1st Boucles de l'Aulne
1st Stage 11 Peace Race
1955
1st Overall Tour de Champagne

1st Stages 2 & 4

2nd Overall Tour de l'Ouest
2nd Paris–Camembert
2nd Paris–Bourges
3rd Boucles de la Seine
3rd Circuit du Morbihan
1956
3rd Overall Critérium du Dauphiné Libéré

1st Stage 3

1957
1st Stages 3b & 9 Critérium du Dauphiné Libéré
7th GP Stan Ockers
1958
1st Stage 6 Paris–Nice
2nd Grand Prix de Saint-Raphaël
3rd Grand Prix de Plouay
1959
1st Stage 2 Grand Prix du Midi Libre
2nd Critérium National de la Route
5th GP Stan Ockers
1960
3rd Grand Prix d'Antibes
1961
1st Points classification, Critérium du Dauphiné Libéré
1st Overall Mi-Août en Bretagne
1st Grand Prix de Plouay
1st Genoa–Nice
1st Circuit de l'Aulne
6th Critérium National de la Route
1963
1st Circuit de l'Aulne
