= Daan de Groot =

Dutch cyclist (1933–1982)

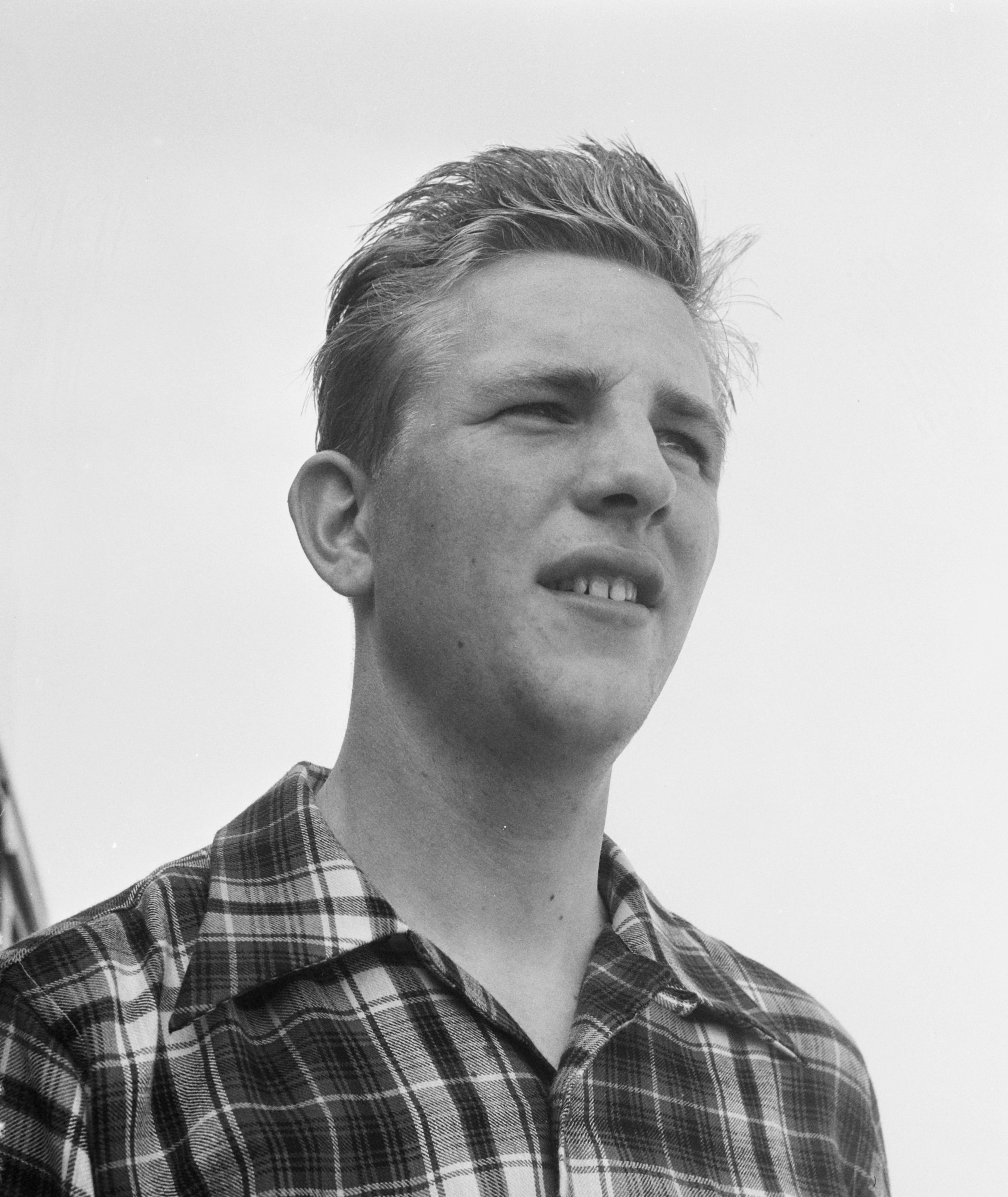
- Daan de Groot in 1952

Personal information
- Full name: Daniël de Groot
- Born: 25 May 1933 Amsterdam, Netherlands
- Died: 8 January 1982 (aged 48) Amsterdam, Netherlands

Cycling career
- Sport: Cycling
- Discipline: Road
- Role: Rider

Daniël ("Daan") de Groot (25 May 1933 – 8 January 1982) was a road bicycle and track cyclist from the Netherlands, who represented his native country at the 1952 Summer Olympics in Helsinki, Finland.

In the 1952 Olympics, De Groot was eliminated in the quarterfinals of the men's 4,000 m team pursuit, alongside Adrie Voorting, Jan Plantaz and Jules Maenen. In 1954, he became a professional road cyclist, which he remained until 1962.

During the thirteenth stage of the 1955 Tour de France, De Groot was initially dropped by the peloton, and had problems with the heat. When he passed a field with cabbage, he took two leaves and put them in his neck and on his head, to protect him from the sun. He regained his strength, and was able to get back to the peloton. The peloton was also suffering from the heat, and De Groot decided to go for his chance, and escaped from the peloton. Nobody answered his attack, so he went solo. After some time, he was told his advantage was "treize minutes" (thirteen minutes), but De Groot's knowledge of the French language was not perfect, and he thought his advantage was three minutes, and he increased his speed. In the end he won the stage by more than twenty minutes.

His sister Jannie competed as a swimmer for the Netherlands at the 1948 Summer Olympics. De Groot committed suicide in 1982, a year after his wife had died.

== Major results ==
1954
Omloop der Kempen
1955
Tour de France:

Winner stage 13

1956
Assen
Netherlands national track pursuit championship
1957
Nuth
1959
Oostburg
Alphen aan de Rijn

== See also ==
- List of Dutch Olympic cyclists
