= Gilbert Bauvin =

French cyclist (born 1927)

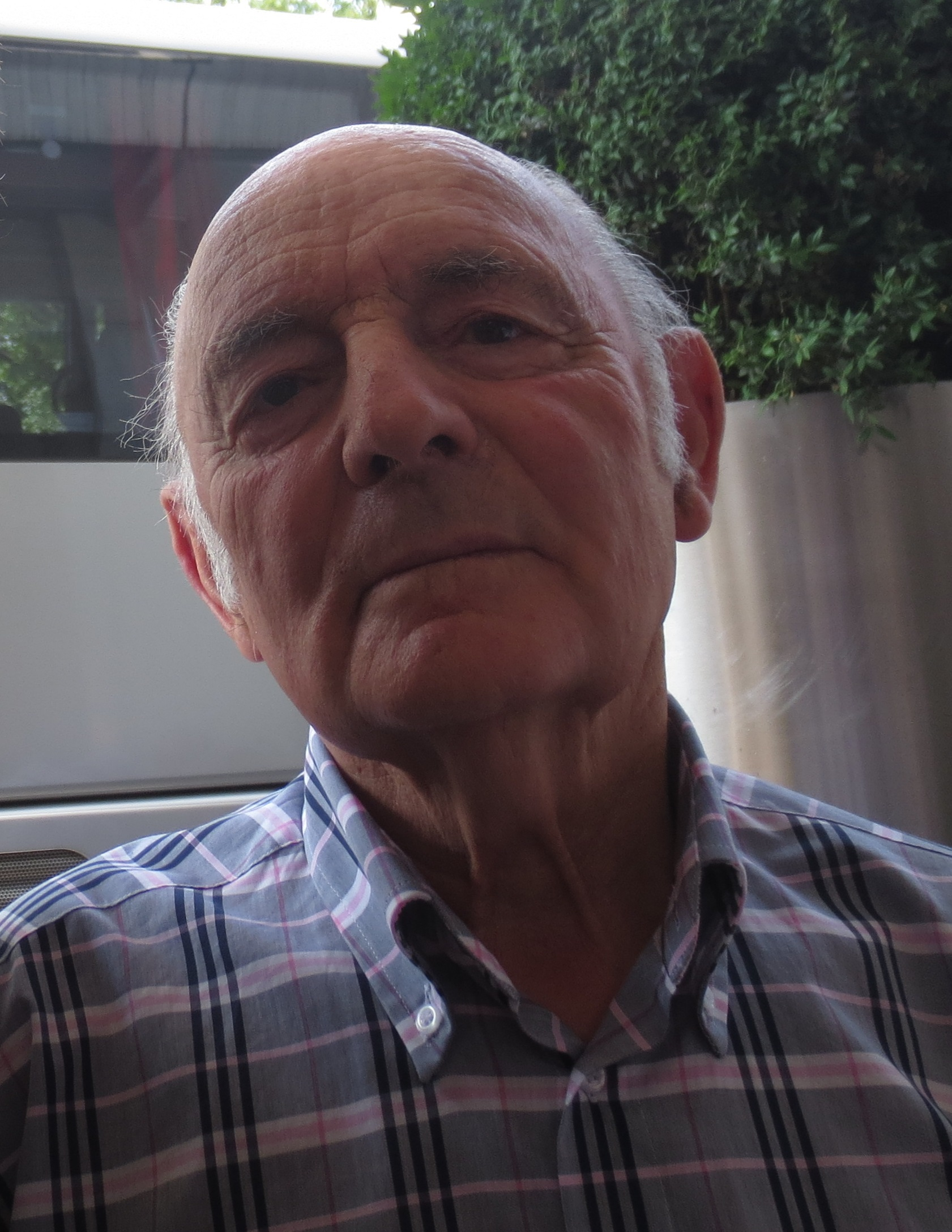

Personal information
- Full name: Gilbert Bauvin
- Born: 4 August 1927 (age 99) Lunéville, France

Cycling career
- Sport: Cycling
- Current team: Retired
- Discipline: Road
- Role: Rider

Major wins
- 4 stages Tour de France
Medal record
Men's cyclo-cross
Representing France
World Championships
Silver medal – second place	1953 Quato	Elite Men's Race

Gilbert Bauvin (born 4 August 1927 in Lunéville, Meurthe-et-Moselle) is a former professional French road bicycle racer. He was a professional from 1950 to 1960. The highlights of his career include winning the Paris–Camembert in 1954 and Tour de Romandie in 1958 and winning four stages in the Tour de France as well as wearing the yellow jersey for a total of four days. His best grand tour result was the 1956 Tour de France, where he finished second after surprise winner Roger Walkowiak.

== Major results ==
1951
Nancy
Tour de France:

8th place overall classification
Wearing yellow jersey for one day

1952
Tour du Doubs
1953
2nd place Cyclo-cross world championship
1954
GP de Cannes
Paris–Camembert
Tour de France:

Winner stages 10 and 12
Wearing yellow jersey for two days
10th place overall classification

1955
Macau
Vuelta a España:

Winner stages 1 and 2

1956
Dakar
Vuelta a España:

Winner stage 10B
7th place overall classification

Circuit du Cher
Tour de France:

2nd place overall classification

1957
GP Monaco
Vuelta a España:

Winner stage 11

Tour de France:

Winner stage 5

1958
Tour de Romandie
Monaco
Tour de France:

Winner stage 3
Wearing yellow jersey for one day
