= Jan Adriaensens =

Belgian cyclist

- Adriaensens in 1960

Personal information
- Full name: Cesar Jan Adriaensens
- Born: 6 June 1932 Willebroek, Belgium
- Died: 2 October 2018 (aged 86)

Cycling career
- Sport: Cycling
- Discipline: Road
- Role: Rider

Professional teams
- 1952–1953: Libertas
- 1953: Rochet–Dunlop
- 1954: Libertas–Huret
- Plume–Vainqueur
- Dossche Sport
- l'Express
- Rochet–Dunlop
- Alpa
- 1955: Libertas–Huret
- Terrot–Hutchinson
- Plume–Vainqueur
- 1956: Mercier–BP–Hutchinson
- 1957: Carpano–Coppi
- 1958: Carpano
- 1959: Elvé–Peugeot
- Peugeot–BP–Dunlop
- 1960: Philco
- 1961: Groene Leeuw–SAS–Sinalco

Major wins
- Four Days of Dunkirk (1956)

Jan (Cesar Jan) Adriaensens (6 June 1932 - 2 October 2018)) was a Belgian road bicycle racer. He finished twice on the podium of the Tour de France, with a third place in 1956 and in 1960. In both these years, he wore the yellow jersey as the leader of the general classification.

== Major victories ==
1955
1st in Tour of Morocco
1956
1st stage Four Days of Dunkirk
4th stage Four Days of Dunkirk
Winner Four Days of Dunkirk
1957
3rd stage Paris–Nice
7th stage Vuelta a España
1958
Tour du Tessin
1961
Flèche Hesbignonne Evernijs (Cras Avernas)

== Major endings ==
1955
5th in de La Flèche Wallonne
5th in Liège–Bastogne–Liège
1956
3rd in the Tour de France
1957
3rd in Paris–Brussels
1958
4th in the Tour de France
1959
2nd place in the Belgian national championship
1960
3rd in the Tour de France

== Tour de France results ==
- 1953 – 45th
- 1955 – 28th
- 1956 – 3rd, wearing yellow jersey for three days
- 1957 – 9th
- 1958 – 4th
- 1959 – 7th
- 1960 – 3rd, wearing yellow jersey for four days
- 1961 – 10th
