= Leo van der Pluym =

Dutch cyclist

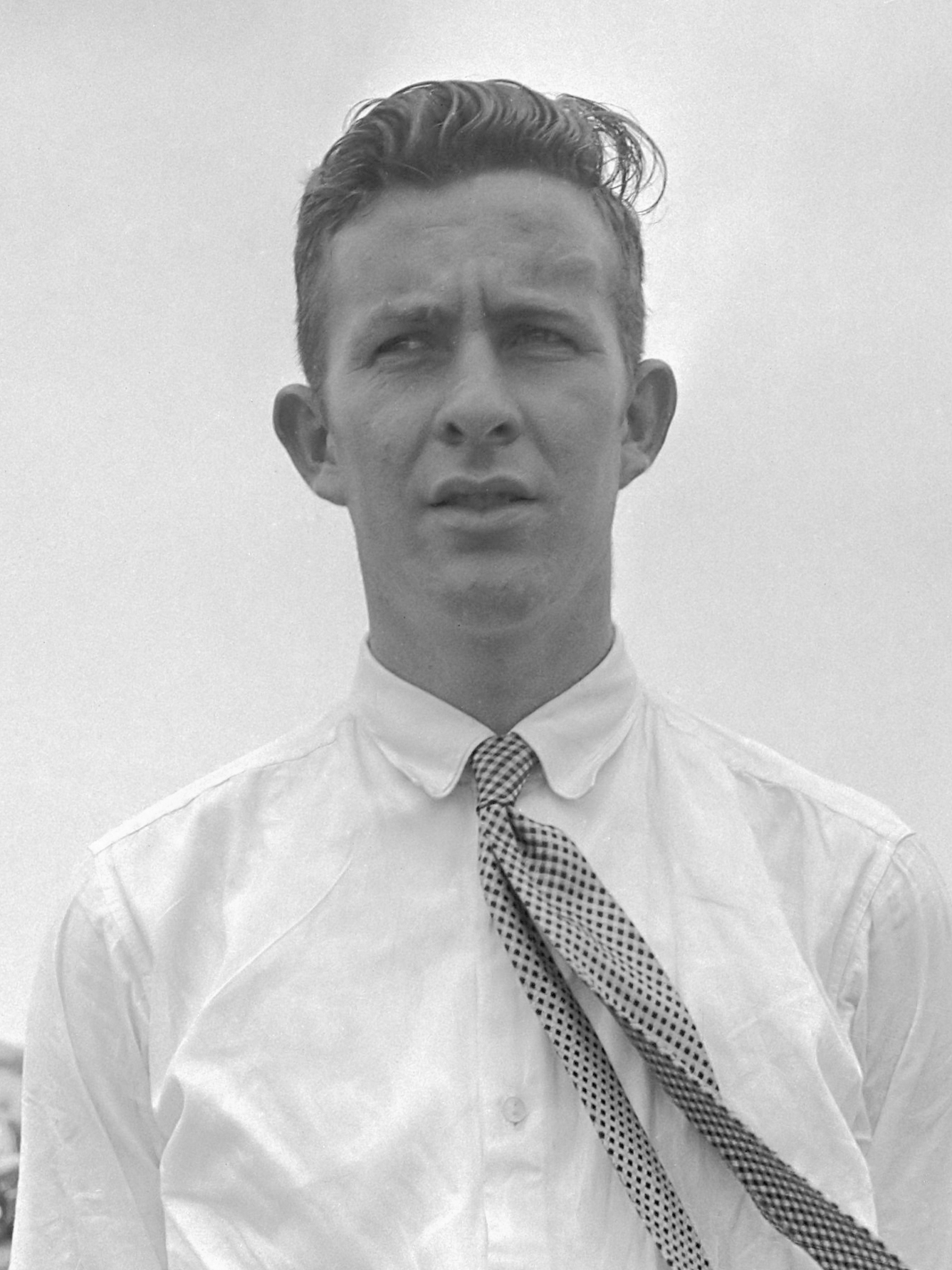
- Leo van der Pluym in 1956

Personal information
- Born: 10 February 1935 Dussen, Netherlands
- Died: 29 August 2020 (aged 85) Made, Netherlands

Cycling career
- Sport: Cycling
- Role: Rider

Leo van der Pluym (10 February 1935 – 29 August 2020) was a Dutch professional racing cyclist. He rode in two editions of the Tour de France, in 1956 and 1957.

He died on 29 August 2020 aged 85.
