= Valentin Huot =

French cyclist

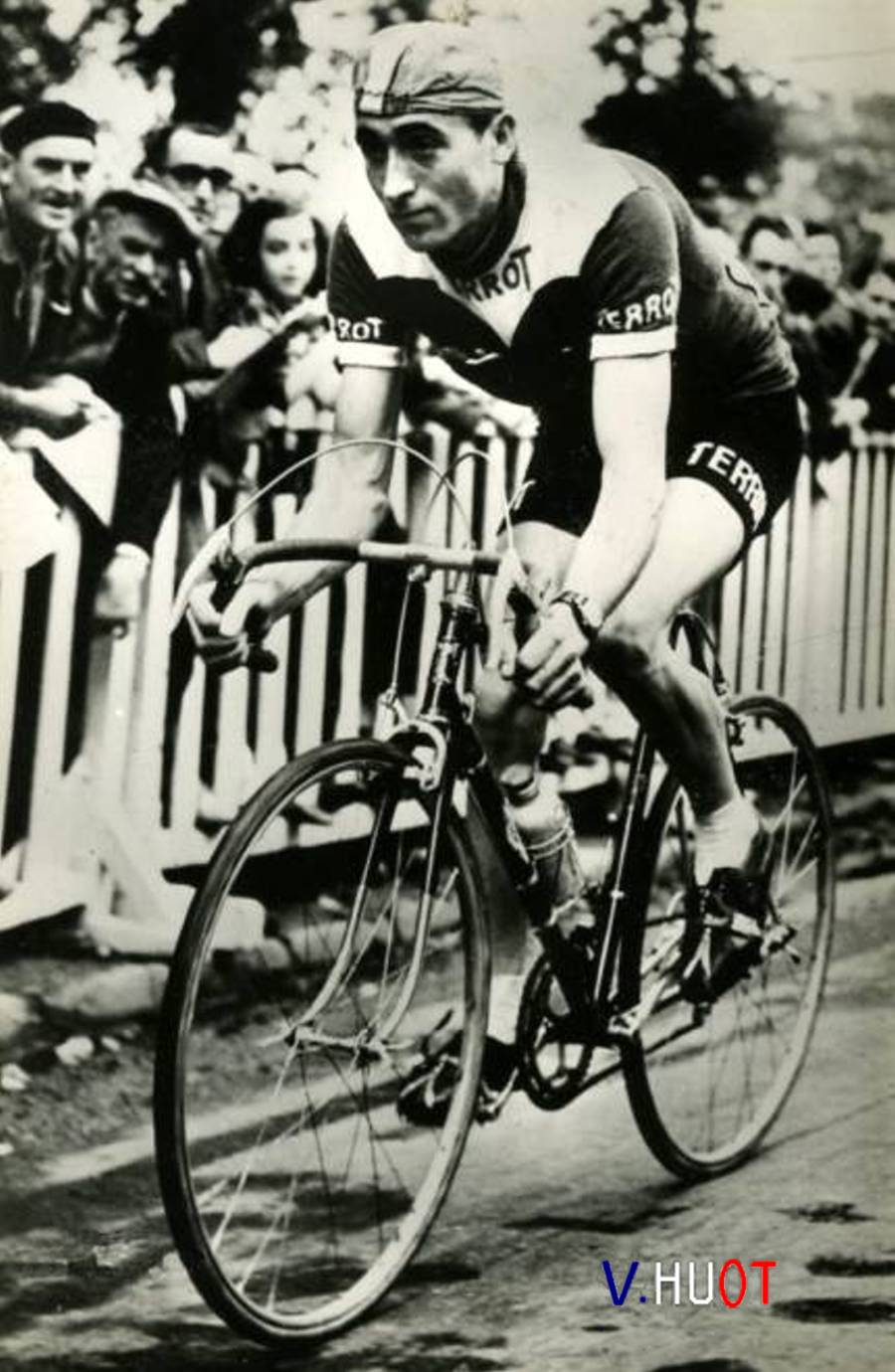

Personal information
- Full name: Valentin Huot
- Born: 1 May 1929 Creyssensac-et-Pissot, France
- Died: 21 November 2017 (aged 88) Manzac-sur-Vern, France

Cycling career
- Sport: Cycling
- Role: Rider

Professional teams
- 1953–1954: Terrot-Hutchinson
- 1955: Rochet–Dunlop
- 1956–1962: Mercier–BP–Hutchinson

Major wins
- One-day races and Classics National Road Race Championships (1957, 1958)

Valentin Huot (1 May 1929 – 21 November 2017) was a French racing cyclist. He won the French national road race title in 1957 and 1958. Huot died on 21 November 2017, aged 88.
