= Raymond Elena =

French cyclist (1931–2024)

Personal information
- Born: 4 August 1931 Oran, French Algeria
- Died: 4 January 2024 (aged 92) Jujurieux, France

Cycling career
- Sport: Cycling
- Role: Rider

Raymond Elena (4 August 1931 – 4 January 2024) was a French professional racing cyclist. He rode in four editions of the Tour de France. Elena died in Jujurieux on 4 January 2024, at the age of 92.
