= Pierre Barbotin =

French cyclist (1926–2009)

Personal information
- Full name: Pierre Barbotin
- Born: 29 September 1926
- Died: 19 February 2009 (aged 82)

Cycling career
- Sport: Cycling

Professional teams
- 1948-1950: Stella-Dunlop
- 1951-1952: Bottecchia
- 1953: Stella-Wolber-Dunlop
- 1954: Royal Condrix
- 1955-1957: Saint Rafhael-R.Geminiani
- 1958: Bobet BP Hutchinson
- 1959: Margnat-Coupry
- 1960: L.Bobet-BP-Hutchinson

Pierre Barbotin (29 September 1926 – 19 February 2009) was a French racing cyclist, riding professionally from about 1948 to 1961. He was born in Nantes and died in the same city.

Barbotin become known in 1951 when he finished second to Louison Bobet in the Milan–San Remo cycle race between Milan and Sanremo. This race marked the beginning of the so-called "B-B" duo - that is, a Bobet-Barbotin partnership where Barbotin became one of the principal teammates of Bobet, especially as part of the Tour de France. Barbotin rode for various teams, including Stella Dunlop (1948–50), Bottechia (1951–52), Stella Wolber Dunlop (1953), Royal-Codrix (1954), Saint Raphael (1955–57), Margnat-Coupry (1959), and Bobet BP Hutchinson (1958, 1960). Barbotin won 13 victories in his career.

== Racing career ==
During his first season as a professional, Barbotin won third place in the Dijon-Lyon race in 1948. The following year he won the team grand prize (Grand Prix de l'Équipe) with André Mahé and Marcel Dussault, and he placed second in the French bike race Manche-Ocean behind Joseph Morvan. In 1950, Barbotin enjoyed one of his greatest victories by winning the Critérium National de la Route, a two-day bicycle stage race held in France every spring. The same year, he finished second in the race for the Grand Prize of Switzerland. In the 1951 Tour de France, Barbotin placed sixth in the final general classification.

== Victories ==
Below is a list of Barbotin's racing victories between 1949 and 1957:

=== 1949 ===
- Grand Prix de l'Equipe (team award with André Mahé et Marcel Dussault)

=== 1950 ===
- Critérium International
- Premier Elan Parisien
- Grand Prix des cycles Robert
- Hennebont

=== 1951 ===
- Circuit de l'Indre
- Paris-Côte d'Azur, stage 3

=== 1954 ===
- Tour du Sud-Est, stage 6

=== 1955 ===
- L'Etoile du Léon (referred to as "critérium du Léon" in 1955 and taking place at Cléder)
- Pontivy

=== 1956 ===
- Critérium du Dauphiné Libéré, stage 7(a)

=== 1957 ===
- Châteaugiron
- Grand Prix de Nantes in 1960

== Other important results ==
Below are some other important results from Barbotin's cycling career, even though they may not have been first-place finishes:

=== 1948 ===
- 2nd place: Grand Prix du Libre-Poitou
- 3rd place: Dijon-Lyon
- 6th place: Grand Prix des Nations

=== 1949 ===
- 2nd place: Manche-Océan
- 3rd place: Grand Prix de Redon
- 5th place: Grand Prix des Nations
- 5th place: Grand Prix de Suisse

=== 1950 ===
- 2nd place: Grand Prix de Suisse
- 2nd place: Grand Prix du Pneumatique
- 3rd place: Saint-Méen le Grand

=== 1951 ===
- 2nd place: Championnat de France
- 2nd place: Milan–San Remo
- 2nd place: Critérium National
- 5th place: Paris-Côte d'Azur
- 6th place: Tour de France (2nd and 3rd stages)

=== 1952 ===
- 7th place: Paris-Côte d'Azur

=== 1953 ===
- 4th place: La Haye-Pesnel

=== 1954 ===
- 3rd place: Paris-Valenciennes

=== 1956 ===
- 2nd place: Critérium de Quillan
- 2nd place: Paris-Nice (2è d'étape)
- 2nd place: Felletin
- 7th place: Critérium du Dauphiné Libéré
- 8th place: Critérium National

=== 1957 ===
- 3rd place: Tour de l'Ouest
- 3rd place: Tour de Normandie
- 3rd place: Saint-Claud
- 4th place: Manche-Océan

=== 1958 ===
- 3rd place: Clohars-Carnoet
- 7th place: Manche-Océan

=== 1959 ===
- 3rd place: Bannalec
- 10th place: Boucles de la Seine in 1959

== Teams ==
Barbotin participated on the following teams:

- 1948: Stella - Dunlop (France)
- 1949: Stella - Dunlop (France)
- 1950: Stella - Dunlop (France)
- 1951: Bottecchia-Ursus (Italie)
- 1951: Stella - Dunlop (France)
- 1952: Stella - Huret (France)
- 1952: Bottecchia (Italie)
- 1953: Stella - Wolber - Dunlop (France)
- 1954: Royal Codrix (France)
- 1954: Stella - Wolber - Dunlop (France)
- 1955: Saint-Raphael - R. Geminiani (France)
- 1956: Saint-Raphael - R. Geminiani (France)
- 1957: Saint-Raphael - R. Geminiani (France)
- 1957: Velo Club Bustese (Italie) du 18-05 au 09-06
- 1958: L. Bobet - BP - Hutchinson (France)
- 1959: Urago - d'Alessandro (France)
- 1959: Bobet - BP - Hutchinson (France)
- 1960: L. Bobet - BP - Hutchinson (France)

== Later life ==
After finishing his career as a professional cyclist in 1961, Barbotin became a sales director of the regional newspaper Presse-Océan.
