= Joseph Mirando =

French cyclist (1931–2020)

Personal information
- Born: 22 May 1931 Terzigno, Italy
- Died: 22 August 2020 (aged 89)

Cycling career
- Sport: Cycling
- Role: Rider

Joseph Mirando (22 May 1931 – 22 August 2020) was a French professional racing cyclist. He rode in five editions of the Tour de France.
