= Gerrit Voorting =

Dutch cyclist (1923–2015)

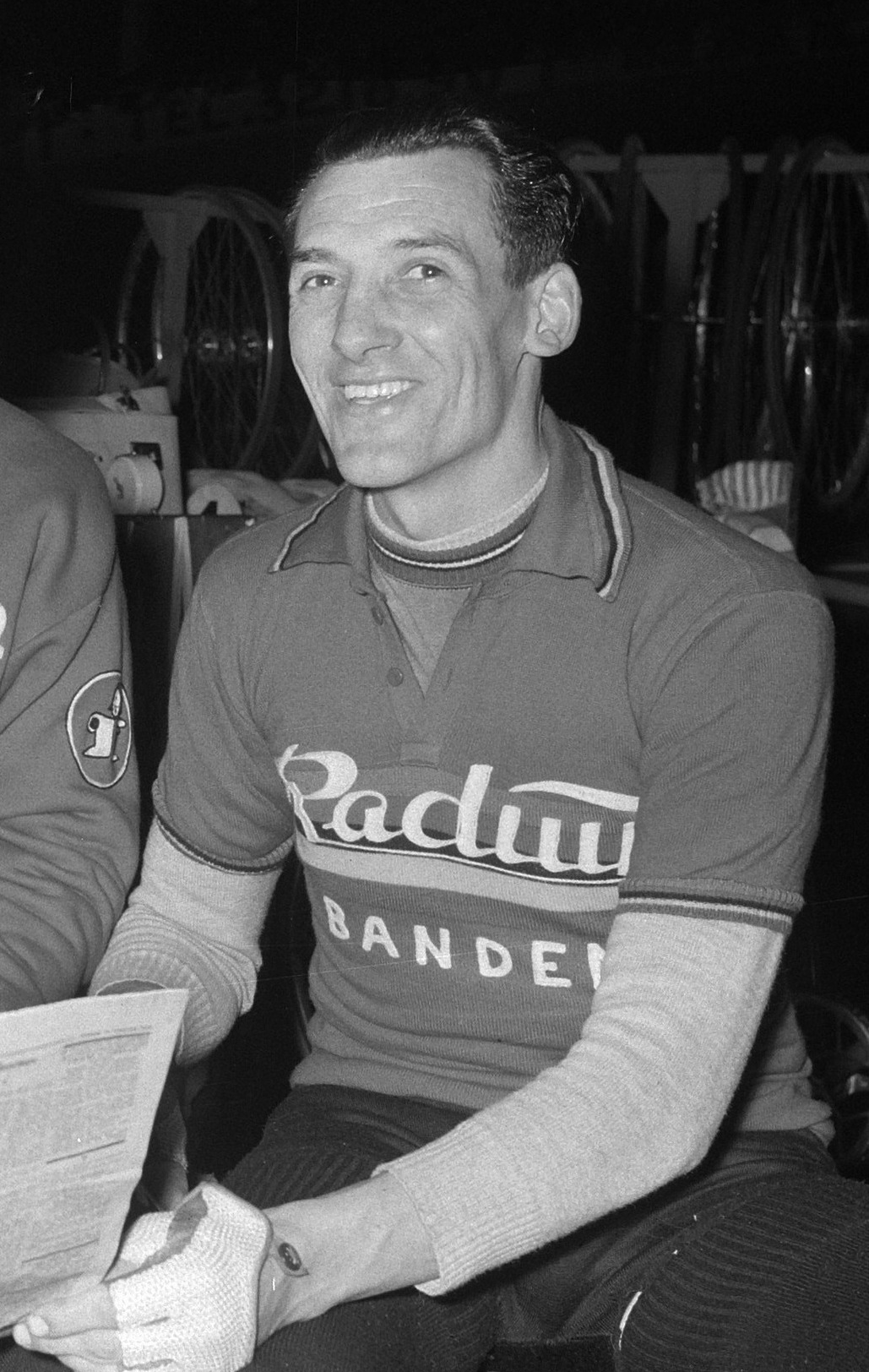
- Gerrit Voorting in 1958

Personal information
- Full name: Gerrit Voorting
- Born: 18 January 1923 Velsen, North Holland, Netherlands
- Died: 30 January 2015 (aged 92) Heemskerk, Netherlands

Cycling career
- Sport: Cycling
- Discipline: Road
- Role: Rider

Professional teams
- 1952: Locomotief-Vredestein
- 1953: Peugeot
- 1954–1959: Locomotief-Vredestein

Major wins
- Silver medal 1948 Olympic Games; Two Tour de France stages
Medal record
Men's road bicycle racing
Representing the Netherlands
Olympic Games
Silver medal – second place	1948 London	Individual road race

Gerardus "Gerrit" Petrus Voorting (18 January 1923 – 30 January 2015) was a Dutch road cyclist who was active between 1947 and 1960. As an amateur he won the silver medal in the individual road race at the 1948 Summer Olympics in London. In his professional career Voorting won two Tour de France stages and wore the yellow jersey for 4 days. Voorting died on 30 January 2015 in his home in Heemskerk at the age of 92, within a week of two other members of the Dutch men's team pursuit squad, Henk Faanhof and Joop Harmans. He was the elder brother of Olympic cyclist Adrie Voorting.

== Major results ==
1948
Silver medal individual road race Olympic Games
1952
Den Bosch
6th stage Ronde van Nederland
Terneuzen
1953
Machelen
1953 Tour de France:

Winner 4th stage

1954
Acht van Chaam
Vlissingen
1955
Maastricht
Zandvoort
1956
Kampen
Netherlands National Championship, Track, 50 km
Oostende
Tour de France:

Wearing yellow jersey for one day

1957
Made
Ronde van Nederland:

Winner stage 7 and 8

Roosendaal
1958
Grote 1-Mei Prijs
Lummen
Ninove
Ronde van Nederland:

Winner 2nd stage

Tour de France:

Winner 2nd stage
Wearing yellow jersey for three days

1959
Made
Ninove
Roosendaal

== See also ==
- List of Dutch Olympic cyclists
- List of Dutch cyclists who have led the Tour de France general classification
