= List of teams and cyclists in the 1957 Tour de France =

List of cyclists

The route of the 1957 Tour de France contained many mountains, so mountain specialists Charly Gaul and Federico Bahamontes were considered as the favourites. Gaul had requested to ride in the Dutch team, but this was not allowed. Louison Bobet and Raphael Géminiani, two important French cyclists, did not race in 1957, so the French team needed new stars. The team was then built around young Jacques Anquetil, who had broken the hour record earlier that year.

The riders who had been favourites in previous years had stopped racing (Fausto Coppi), had lost their greatness (Hugo Koblet), or had chosen not to participate (Louison Bobet). As a result, there was no outspoken favourite. Roger Walkowiak, who had won the previous edition, had not shown good results since. Gaul had lost the 1957 Giro d'Italia when he was almost sure of winning it, so he was not considered to be in great form. Gastone Nencini, who won the 1957 Giro, was not considered constant enough. The Spanish team was considered the best Spanish team ever, but they were more a favourite for the mountain classification than for the general classification. The Belgian team was focussed around Jan Adriaensens.

== Start list ==
=== By team ===
France
No.	Rider	Pos.
1	Roger Walkowiak (FRA)	DNF
2	Jacques Anquetil (FRA)	1
3	Gilbert Bauvin (FRA)	14
4	Louis Bergaud (FRA)	26
5	Albert Bouvet (FRA)	50
6	André Darrigade (FRA)	27
7	Jean Forestier (FRA)	4
8	François Mahé (FRA)	11
9	René Privat (FRA)	31
10	Jean Stablinski (FRA)	43

Belgium
No.	Rider	Pos.
11	Jan Adriaensens (BEL)	9
12	Pino Cerami (BEL)	35
13	Alex Close (BEL)	DNF
14	Fred De Bruyne (BEL)	DNF
15	Marcel Janssens (BEL)	2
16	Norbert Kerckhove (BEL)	DNF
17	Désiré Keteleer (BEL)	17
18	Jef Planckaert (BEL)	16
19	Frans Schoubben (BEL)	DNF
20	Martin Van Geneugden (BEL)	DNF

Italy
No.	Rider	Pos.
21	Giancarlo Astrua (ITA)	DNF
22	Pierino Baffi (ITA)	23
23	Mario Baroni (ITA)	53
24	Nino Defilippis (ITA)	7
25	Gianni Ferlenghi (ITA)	DNF
26	Gastone Nencini (ITA)	6
27	Arigo Padovan (ITA)	20
28	Giuseppe Pintarelli (ITA)	DNF
29	Bruno Tognaccini (ITA)	DNF
30	Mario Tosato (ITA)	21

Netherlands
No.	Rider	Pos.
31	Daan de Groot (NED)	DNF
32	Piet De Jongh (NED)	33
33	Jaap Kersten (NED)	45
34	Michel Stolker (NED)	44
35	Léo Van Der Pluym (NED)	DNF
36	Wim van Est (NED)	8
37	Piet van Est (NED)	32
38	Gerrit Voorting (NED)	29
39	Adrie Van Wetten (NED)	DNF
40	Wout Wagtmans (NED)	DNF

Spain
No.	Rider	Pos.
41	Benigno Azpuru (ESP)	DNF
42	Federico Bahamontes (ESP)	DNF
43	Antonio Barrutia (ESP)	DNF
44	Antonio Ferraz (ESP)	DNF
45	Jesús Loroño (ESP)	5
46	Carmelo Morales (ESP)	54
47	Miguel Poblet (ESP)	DNF
48	Bernardo Ruiz (ESP)	24
49	Antonio Suárez (ESP)	DNF
50	Andrés Trobat (ESP)	DNF

Luxembourg/Mixed
No.	Rider	Pos.
51	Antonio Barbosa Alves (POR)	DNF
52	Aldo Bolzan (ITA)	DNF
53	José da Silva (POR)	25
54	Marcel Ernzer (LUX)	DNF
55	Lothar Friedrich (FRG)	DNF
56	Charly Gaul (LUX)	DNF
57	Willy Kemp (LUX)	DNF
58	Nicolas Morn (LUX)	DNF
59	Brian Robinson (GBR)	DNF
60	Jean-Pierre Schmitz (LUX)	DNF

Switzerland
No.	Rider	Pos.
61	Marcel Senn (SUI)	DNF
62	Adolf Christian (AUT)	3
63	Carlo Clerici (SUI)	DNF
64	Walter Favre (SUI)	51
65	Rolf Graf (SUI)	DNF
66	Hans Hollenstein (SUI)	DNF
67	Walter Holenweger (SUI)	49
68	Tony Graeser (SUI)	55
69	Max Schellenberg (SUI)	DNF
70	Alcide Vaucher (SUI)	DNF

France - West
No.	Rider	Pos.
71	Pierre Barbotin (FRA)	DNF
72	Jean Bourlès (FRA)	36
73	Marcel Carfantan (FRA)	DNF
74	Joseph Groussard (FRA)	42
75	Claude Le Ber (FRA)	DNF
76	Joseph Morvan (FRA)	DNF
77	Fernand Picot (FRA)	13
78	Francis Pipelin (FRA)	46
79	Pierre Poulingue (FRA)	48
80	Joseph Thomin (FRA)	18

France - South-East
No.	Rider	Pos.
81	Francis Siguenza (FRA)	52
82	Henry Anglade (FRA)	28
83	Emmanuel Busto (FRA)	DNF
84	Charles Coste (FRA)	DNF
85	Jean Dotto (FRA)	10
86	Raymond Elena (FRA)	DNF
87	René Faure (FRA)	DNF
88	Nello Lauredi (FRA)	DNF
89	Raymond Meyzencq (FRA)	DNF
90	Roger Chaussabel (FRA)	47

France - North-East/Centre
No.	Rider	Pos.
91	Jean-Claude Annaert (FRA)	DNF
92	Ugo Anzile (FRA)	DNF
93	Mario Bertolo (ITA)	DNF
94	Max Cohen (FRA)	DNF
95	Ferdinand Deveze (FRA)	DNF
96	Jean Graczyk (FRA)	DNF
97	Roger Hassenforder (FRA)	DNF
98	Marcel Rohrbach (FRA)	12
99	Antonin Rolland (FRA)	39
100	Pierre Ruby (FRA)	41

France - South-West
No.	Rider	Pos.
101	Jacques Bianco (FRA)	DNF
102	Claude Colette (FRA)	DNF
103	André Dupré (FRA)	37
104	Georges Gay (FRA)	22
105	Robert Gibanel (FRA)	DNF
106	Valentin Huot (FRA)	DNF
107	Maurice Lampre (FRA)	38
108	Marcel Queheille (FRA)	30
109	Tino Sabbadini (FRA)	DNF
110	André Trochut (FRA)	DNF

France - Île-de-France
No.	Rider	Pos.
111	Nicolas Barone (FRA)	40
112	Jean Bellay (FRA)	DNF
113	Guy Buchaille (FRA)	DNF
114	Stanislas Bober (FRA)	DNF
115	Jean Bobet (FRA)	15
116	René Fournier (FRA)	DNF
117	Raymond Hoorelbeke (FRA)	19
118	André Le Dissez (FRA)	34
119	Raymond Plaza (FRA)	DNF
120	Guy Million (FRA)	56

=== By rider ===
Legend
No.	Starting number worn by the rider during the Tour
Pos.	Position in the general classification
DNF	Denotes a rider who did not finish

No.	Name	Nationality	Team	Pos.	Ref
1	Roger Walkowiak	France	France	DNF	
2	Jacques Anquetil	France	France	1	
3	Gilbert Bauvin	France	France	14	
4	Louis Bergaud	France	France	26	
5	Albert Bouvet	France	France	50	
6	André Darrigade	France	France	27	
7	Jean Forestier	France	France	4	
8	François Mahé	France	France	11	
9	René Privat	France	France	31	
10	Jean Stablinski	France	France	43	
11	Jan Adriaensens	Belgium	Belgium	9	
12	Pino Cerami	Belgium	Belgium	35	
13	Alex Close	Belgium	Belgium	DNF	
14	Fred De Bruyne	Belgium	Belgium	DNF	
15	Marcel Janssens	Belgium	Belgium	2	
16	Norbert Kerckhove	Belgium	Belgium	DNF	
17	Désiré Keteleer	Belgium	Belgium	17	
18	Jef Planckaert	Belgium	Belgium	16	
19	Frans Schoubben	Belgium	Belgium	DNF	
20	Martin Van Geneugden	Belgium	Belgium	DNF	
21	Giancarlo Astrua	Italy	Italy	DNF	
22	Pierino Baffi	Italy	Italy	23	
23	Mario Baroni	Italy	Italy	53	
24	Nino Defilippis	Italy	Italy	7	
25	Gianni Ferlenghi	Italy	Italy	DNF	
26	Gastone Nencini	Italy	Italy	6	
27	Arigo Padovan	Italy	Italy	20	
28	Giuseppe Pintarelli	Italy	Italy	DNF	
29	Bruno Tognaccini	Italy	Italy	DNF	
30	Mario Tosato	Italy	Italy	21	
31	Daan de Groot	Netherlands	Netherlands	DNF	
32	Piet De Jongh	Netherlands	Netherlands	33	
33	Jaap Kersten	Netherlands	Netherlands	45	
34	Michel Stolker	Netherlands	Netherlands	44	
35	Léo Van Der Pluym	Netherlands	Netherlands	DNF	
36	Wim van Est	Netherlands	Netherlands	8	
37	Piet van Est	Netherlands	Netherlands	32	
38	Gerrit Voorting	Netherlands	Netherlands	29	
39	Arie van Wetten	Netherlands	Netherlands	DNF	
40	Wout Wagtmans	Netherlands	Netherlands	DNF	
41	Manuel Aizpuru	Spain	Spain	DNF	
42	Federico Bahamontes	Spain	Spain	DNF	
43	Antonio Barrutia	Spain	Spain	DNF	
44	Antonio Ferraz	Spain	Spain	DNF	
45	Jesús Loroño	Spain	Spain	5	
46	Carmelo Morales	Spain	Spain	54	
47	Miguel Poblet	Spain	Spain	DNF	
48	Bernardo Ruiz	Spain	Spain	24	
49	Antonio Suárez	Spain	Spain	DNF	
50	Andrés Trobat	Spain	Spain	DNF	
51	Antonio Barbosa Alves	Portugal	Luxembourg/Mixed	DNF	
52	Aldo Bolzan	Italy	Luxembourg/Mixed	DNF	
53	José da Silva	Portugal	Luxembourg/Mixed	25	
54	Marcel Ernzer	Luxembourg	Luxembourg/Mixed	DNF	
55	Lothar Friedrich	West Germany	Luxembourg/Mixed	DNF	
56	Charly Gaul	Luxembourg	Luxembourg/Mixed	DNF	
57	Willy Kemp	Luxembourg	Luxembourg/Mixed	DNF	
58	Nicolas Morn	Luxembourg	Luxembourg/Mixed	DNF	
59	Brian Robinson	Great Britain	Luxembourg/Mixed	DNF	
60	Jean-Pierre Schmitz	Luxembourg	Luxembourg/Mixed	DNF	
61	Marcel Senn	Switzerland	Switzerland	DNF	
62	Adolf Christian	Austria	Switzerland	3	
63	Carlo Clerici	Switzerland	Switzerland	DNF	
64	Walter Favre	Switzerland	Switzerland	51	
65	Rolf Graf	Switzerland	Switzerland	DNF	
66	Hans Hollenstein	Switzerland	Switzerland	DNF	
67	Walter Holenweger	Switzerland	Switzerland	49	
68	Toni Gräser	Switzerland	Switzerland	55	
69	Max Schellenberg	Switzerland	Switzerland	DNF	
70	Alcide Vaucher	Switzerland	Switzerland	DNF	
71	Pierre Barbotin	France	France - West	DNF	
72	Jean Bourlès	France	France - West	36	
73	Marcel Carfantan	France	France - West	DNF	
74	Joseph Groussard	France	France - West	42	
75	Claude Le Ber	France	France - West	DNF	
76	Joseph Morvan	France	France - West	DNF	
77	Fernand Picot	France	France - West	13	
78	Francis Pipelin	France	France - West	46	
79	Pierre Poulingue	France	France - West	48	
80	Joseph Thomin	France	France - West	18	
81	Francis Siguenza	France	France - South-East	52	
82	Henry Anglade	France	France - South-East	28	
83	Emmanuel Busto	France	France - South-East	DNF	
84	Charles Coste	France	France - South-East	DNF	
85	Jean Dotto	France	France - South-East	10	
86	Raymond Elena	France	France - South-East	DNF	
87	René Faure	France	France - South-East	DNF	
88	Nello Lauredi	France	France - South-East	DNF	
89	Raymond Meyzencq	France	France - South-East	DNF	
90	Roger Chaussabel	France	France - South-East	47	
91	Jean-Claude Annaert	France	France - North-East/Centre	DNF	
92	Ugo Anzile	France	France - North-East/Centre	DNF	
93	Mario Bertolo	Italy	France - North-East/Centre	DNF	
94	Max Cohen	France	France - North-East/Centre	DNF	
95	Ferdinand Devèze	France	France - North-East/Centre	DNF	
96	Jean Graczyk	France	France - North-East/Centre	DNF	
97	Roger Hassenforder	France	France - North-East/Centre	DNF	
98	Marcel Rohrbach	France	France - North-East/Centre	12	
99	Antonin Rolland	France	France - North-East/Centre	39	
100	Pierre Ruby	France	France - North-East/Centre	41	
101	Jacques Bianco	France	France - South-West	DNF	
102	Claude Colette	France	France - South-West	DNF	
103	André Dupré	France	France - South-West	37	
104	Georges Gay	France	France - South-West	22	
105	Robert Gibanel	France	France - South-West	DNF	
106	Valentin Huot	France	France - South-West	DNF	
107	Maurice Lampre	France	France - South-West	38	
108	Marcel Queheille	France	France - South-West	30	
109	Tino Sabbadini	France	France - South-West	DNF	
110	André Trochut	France	France - South-West	DNF	
111	Nicolas Barone	France	France - Île-de-France	40	
112	Jean Bellay	France	France - Île-de-France	DNF	
113	Guy Buchaille	France	France - Île-de-France	DNF	
114	Stanislas Bober	France	France - Île-de-France	DNF	
115	Jean Bobet	France	France - Île-de-France	15	
116	René Fournier	France	France - Île-de-France	DNF	
117	Raymond Hoorelbeke	France	France - Île-de-France	19	
118	André Le Dissez	France	France - Île-de-France	34	
119	Raymond Plaza	France	France - Île-de-France	DNF	
120	Guy Million	France	France - Île-de-France	56	
