= 1957 Tour de France, Stage 1 to Stage 11 =

Cycling race stages

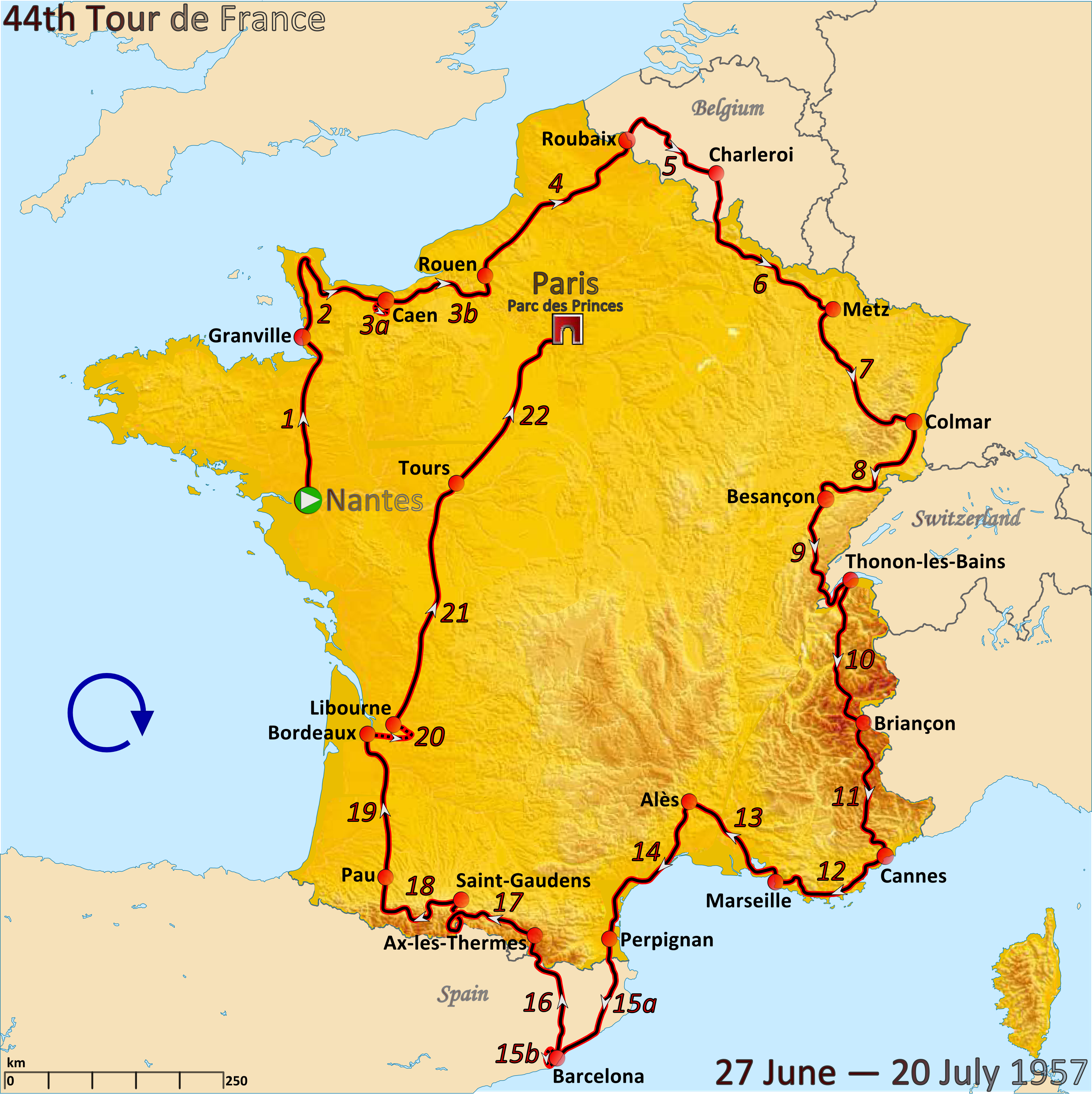
Route of the 1957 Tour de France

The 1957 Tour de France was the 44th edition of Tour de France, one of cycling's Grand Tours. The Tour began in Nantes with a flat stage on 27 June and Stage 11 occurred on 8 July with a mountainous stage to Cannes. The race finished in Paris on 20 July.

== Stage 1 ==
27 June 1957 - Nantes to Granville, 204 km (126.8 mi)

Stage 1 result

Rank	Rider	Team	Time
1	André Darrigade (FRA)	France	4h 56' 18"
2	Miguel Poblet (ESP)	Spain	s.t.
3	Joseph Thomin (FRA)	France - West	s.t.
4	Gastone Nencini (ITA)	Italy	s.t.
5	Wim van Est (NED)	Netherlands	s.t.
6	Max Schellenberg (SUI)	Switzerland	s.t.
7	Arigo Padovan (ITA)	Italy	s.t.
8	Daan de Groot (NED)	Netherlands	s.t.
9	Jean Stablinski (FRA)	France	s.t.
10	Gianni Ferlenghi (ITA)	Italy	+ 8"

General classification after stage 1

Rank	Rider	Team	Time
1	André Darrigade (FRA)	France	4h 55' 18"
2	Miguel Poblet (ESP)	Spain	+ 30"
3	Joseph Thomin (FRA)	France - West	+ 1' 00"
4	Gastone Nencini (ITA)	Italy	s.t.
5	Wim van Est (NED)	Netherlands	s.t.
6	Max Schellenberg (SUI)	Switzerland	s.t.
7	Arigo Padovan (ITA)	Italy	s.t.
8	Daan de Groot (NED)	Netherlands	s.t.
9	Jean Stablinski (FRA)	France	s.t.
10	Gianni Ferlenghi (ITA)	Italy	+ 1' 08"

== Stage 2 ==
28 June 1957 - Granville to Caen, 226 km (140.4 mi)

Stage 2 result

Rank	Rider	Team	Time
1	René Privat (FRA)	France	6h 09' 22"
2	Joseph Thomin (FRA)	France - West	+ 3' 32"
3	Fernand Picot (FRA)	France - West	s.t.
4	Gilbert Bauvin (FRA)	France	s.t.
5	Stanislas Bober (FRA)	France - Île-de-France	s.t.
6	Gianni Ferlenghi (ITA)	Italy	s.t.
7	Nicolas Barone (FRA)	France - Île-de-France	s.t.
8	André Le Dissez (FRA)	France - Île-de-France	s.t.
9	Giancarlo Astrua (ITA)	Italy	s.t.
10	Adolf Christian (AUT)	Switzerland	s.t.

General classification after stage 2

Rank	Rider	Team	Time
1	René Privat (FRA)	France	11h 04' 48"
2	Joseph Thomin (FRA)	France - West	+ 3' 54"
3	Jean Forestier (FRA)	France	+ 4' 32"
4	Gianni Ferlenghi (ITA)	Italy	s.t.
5	Albert Bouvet (FRA)	France	+ 5' 55"
6	Fernand Picot (FRA)	France - West	s.t.
7	Francis Pipelin (FRA)	France - West	s.t.
8	Stanislas Bober (FRA)	France - Île-de-France	s.t.
9	Gilbert Bauvin (FRA)	France	+ 6' 02"
10	Giancarlo Astrua (ITA)	Italy	s.t.

== Stage 3a ==
29 June 1957 - Caen, 15 km (9.3 mi) (TTT)

Stage 3a result

Rank	Team	Time
1	France	57' 54"
2	Belgium	+ 12"
3	Netherlands	+ 42"
4	France - Île-de-France	+ 1' 48"
5	Switzerland	s.t.
6	France - West	+ 1' 54"
7	Italy	+ 1' 56"
8	France - South-West	+ 2' 03"
9	France - North-East/Centre	s.t.
10	Luxembourg/Mixed	+ 2' 12"

General classification after stage 3a

Rank	Rider	Team	Time
1	René Privat (FRA)	France	11h 24' 06"
2	Joseph Thomin (FRA)	France - West	+ 4' 32"
3	Jean Forestier (FRA)	France	s.t.
4	Gianni Ferlenghi (ITA)	Italy	+ 5' 11"
5	Albert Bouvet (FRA)	France	+ 5' 55"
6	Gilbert Bauvin (FRA)	France	+ 6' 02"
7	Stanislas Bober (FRA)	France - Île-de-France	+ 6' 31"
8	Fernand Picot (FRA)	France - West	+ 6' 33"
9	Francis Pipelin (FRA)	France - West	s.t.
10	Adolf Christian (AUT)	Switzerland	+ 6' 38"

== Stage 3b ==
29 June 1957 - Caen to Rouen, 134 km (83 mi)

Stage 3b result

Rank	Rider	Team	Time
1	Jacques Anquetil (FRA)	France	3h 23' 44"
2	Georges Gay (FRA)	France - South-West	s.t.
3	Gastone Nencini (ITA)	Italy	s.t.
4	Federico Bahamontes (ESP)	Spain	s.t.
5	Giancarlo Astrua (ITA)	Italy	s.t.
6	Nicolas Barone (FRA)	France - Île-de-France	s.t.
7	Adolf Christian (AUT)	Switzerland	s.t.
8	Jaap Kersten (NED)	Netherlands	s.t.
9	Walter Holenweger (SUI)	Switzerland	s.t.
10	Jean Dotto (FRA)	France - South-East	s.t.

General classification after stage 3b

Rank	Rider	Team	Time
1	René Privat (FRA)	France	14h 48' 00"
2	Adolf Christian (AUT)	Switzerland	+ 6' 28"
3	Nicolas Barone (FRA)	France - Île-de-France	s.t.
4	Federico Bahamontes (ESP)	Spain	+ 6' 42"
5	Giancarlo Astrua (ITA)	Italy	+ 6' 43"
6	Jean Dotto (FRA)	France - South-East	+ 6' 59"
7	Roger Walkowiak (FRA)	France	+ 9' 13"
8	Gastone Nencini (ITA)	Italy	+ 9' 16"
9	Jacques Anquetil (FRA)	France	+ 9' 32"
10	Carlo Clerici (SUI)	Switzerland	+ 11' 34"

== Stage 4 ==
30 June 1957 - Rouen to Roubaix, 232 km (144 mi)

Stage 4 result

Rank	Rider	Team	Time
1	Marcel Janssens (BEL)	Belgium	6h 23' 34"
2	Max Schellenberg (SUI)	Switzerland	+ 4' 42"
3	Stanislas Bober (FRA)	France - Île-de-France	s.t.
4	Wim van Est (NED)	Netherlands	s.t.
5	Francis Siguenza (FRA)	France - South-East	s.t.
6	Piet van Est (NED)	Netherlands	s.t.
7	Jean Stablinski (FRA)	France	+ 6' 58"
8	André Darrigade (FRA)	France	+ 7' 13"
9	Mario Baroni (ITA)	Italy	s.t.
10	Fred De Bruyne (BEL)	Belgium	+ 7' 25"

General classification after stage 4

Rank	Rider	Team	Time
1	René Privat (FRA)	France	21h 22' 31"
2	Adolf Christian (AUT)	Switzerland	+ 6' 28"
3	Nicolas Barone (FRA)	France - Île-de-France	s.t.
4	Federico Bahamontes (ESP)	Spain	+ 6' 42"
5	Giancarlo Astrua (ITA)	Italy	+ 6' 43"
6	Jean Dotto (FRA)	France - South-East	+ 6' 59"
7	Roger Walkowiak (FRA)	France	+ 8' 32"
8	Marcel Janssens (BEL)	Belgium	+ 8' 58"
9	Gastone Nencini (ITA)	Italy	+ 9' 16"
10	Stanislas Bober (FRA)	France - Île-de-France	+ 9' 28"

== Stage 5 ==
1 July 1957 - Roubaix to Charleroi, 170 km (110 mi)

Stage 5 result

Rank	Rider	Team	Time
1	Gilbert Bauvin (FRA)	France	4h 25' 26"
2	Fernand Picot (FRA)	France - West	s.t.
3	Daan de Groot (NED)	Netherlands	+ 2"
4	Jacques Anquetil (FRA)	France	+ 3"
5	Jean Bobet (FRA)	France - Île-de-France	s.t.
6	Jef Planckaert (BEL)	Belgium	+ 1' 08"
7	Max Schellenberg (SUI)	Switzerland	+ 1' 37"
8	Joseph Thomin (FRA)	France - West	s.t.
9	Gerrit Voorting (NED)	Netherlands	+ 1' 38"
10	Marcel Janssens (BEL)	Belgium	s.t.

General classification after stage 5

Rank	Rider	Team	Time
1	Jacques Anquetil (FRA)	France	25h 57' 32"
2	Marcel Janssens (BEL)	Belgium	+ 1' 01"
3	Jean Forestier (FRA)	France	+ 3' 17"
4	René Privat (FRA)	France	+ 3' 29"
5	Max Schellenberg (SUI)	Switzerland	+ 4' 09"
6	Roger Walkowiak (FRA)	France	+ 3' 52"
7	Fernand Picot (FRA)	France - West	+ 5' 40"
8	Joseph Thomin (FRA)	France - West	+ 5' 46"
9	Gilbert Bauvin (FRA)	France	+ 5' 54"
10	Jean Bobet (FRA)	France - Île-de-France	+ 6' 26"

== Stage 6 ==
2 July 1957 - Charleroi to Metz, 248 km (154 mi)

Stage 6 result

Rank	Rider	Team	Time
1	André Trochut (FRA)	France - South-West	6h 29' 54"
2	Joseph Groussard (FRA)	France - West	s.t.
3	Mario Bertolo (ITA)	France - North-East/Centre	s.t.
4	Nello Lauredi (FRA)	France - South-East	s.t.
5	Pierino Baffi (ITA)	Italy	+ 9' 45"
6	François Mahé (FRA)	France	s.t.
7	Marcel Rohrbach (FRA)	France - North-East/Centre	s.t.
8	Adolf Christian (AUT)	Switzerland	+ 14' 13"
9	André Darrigade (FRA)	France	+ 14' 37"
10	Fred De Bruyne (BEL)	Belgium	s.t.

General classification after stage 6

Rank	Rider	Team	Time
1	Jacques Anquetil (FRA)	France	32h 42' 03"
2	Marcel Janssens (BEL)	Belgium	+ 1' 01"
3	Jean Forestier (FRA)	France	+ 3' 17"
4	René Privat (FRA)	France	+ 3' 29"
5	Max Schellenberg (SUI)	Switzerland	+ 4' 09"
6	Roger Walkowiak (FRA)	France	+ 4' 22"
7	Fernand Picot (FRA)	France - West	+ 5' 40"
8	Joseph Thomin (FRA)	France - West	+ 5' 46"
9	Gilbert Bauvin (FRA)	France	+ 5' 54"
10	Jean Bobet (FRA)	France - Île-de-France	+ 6' 26"

== Stage 7 ==
3 July 1957 - Metz to Colmar, 223 km (139 mi)

Stage 7 result

Rank	Rider	Team	Time
1	Roger Hassenforder (FRA)	France - North-East/Centre	6h 21' 13"
2	Gerrit Voorting (NED)	Netherlands	s.t.
3	François Mahé (FRA)	France	s.t.
4	Jacques Bianco (FRA)	France - South-West	s.t.
5	Louis Bergaud (FRA)	France	s.t.
6	Piet De Jongh (NED)	Netherlands	s.t.
7	Jesús Loroño (ESP)	Spain	s.t.
8	Jean Bourlès (FRA)	France - West	s.t.
9	Nicolas Barone (FRA)	France - Île-de-France	s.t.
10	Henry Anglade (FRA)	France - South-East	s.t.

General classification after stage 7

Rank	Rider	Team	Time
1	Nicolas Barone (FRA)	France - Île-de-France	39h 11' 33"
2	Jacques Anquetil (FRA)	France	+ 38"
3	Marcel Janssens (BEL)	Belgium	+ 1' 39"
4	Jean Forestier (FRA)	France	+ 3' 55"
5	Max Schellenberg (SUI)	Switzerland	+ 4' 47"
6	Joseph Thomin (FRA)	France - West	+ 6' 24"
7	Jean Bobet (FRA)	France - Île-de-France	+ 7' 04"
8	François Mahé (FRA)	France	+ 7' 22"
9	Roger Walkowiak (FRA)	France	+ 7' 41"
10	Fernand Picot (FRA)	France - West	+ 8' 59"

== Stage 8 ==
4 July 1957 - Colmar to Besançon, 192 km (119 mi)

Stage 8 result

Rank	Rider	Team	Time
1	Pierino Baffi (ITA)	Italy	5h 18' 59"
2	Raymond Hoorelbeke (FRA)	France - Île-de-France	s.t.
3	Mario Tosato (ITA)	Italy	s.t.
4	Jef Planckaert (BEL)	Belgium	s.t.
5	Wim van Est (NED)	Netherlands	s.t.
6	Pierre Poulingue (FRA)	France - West	s.t.
7	Fernand Picot (FRA)	France - West	s.t.
8	Antonio Barbosa Alves (POR)	Luxembourg/Mixed	s.t.
9	Georges Gay (FRA)	France - South-West	s.t.
10	Bruno Tognaccini (ITA)	Italy	s.t.

General classification after stage 8

Rank	Rider	Team	Time
1	Jean Forestier (FRA)	France	44h 34' 27"
2	Fernand Picot (FRA)	France - West	+ 5' 04"
3	Wim van Est (NED)	Netherlands	+ 11' 54"
4	Jacques Anquetil (FRA)	France	+ 14' 28"
5	Marcel Rohrbach (FRA)	France - North-East/Centre	+ 15' 10"
6	Marcel Janssens (BEL)	Belgium	+ 15' 29"
7	Jesús Loroño (ESP)	Spain	+ 18' 21"
8	Joseph Thomin (FRA)	France - West	+ 20' 14"
9	Jean Bobet (FRA)	France - Île-de-France	+ 20' 54"
10	François Mahé (FRA)	France	+ 21' 12"

== Stage 9 ==
5 July 1957 - Besançon to Thonon-les-Bains, 188 km (117 mi)

Stage 9 result

Rank	Rider	Team	Time
1	Jacques Anquetil (FRA)	France	5h 04' 38"
2	Max Schellenberg (SUI)	Switzerland	s.t.
3	Maurice Lampre (FRA)	France - South-West	s.t.
4	Jef Planckaert (BEL)	Belgium	s.t.
5	Jean Bourlès (FRA)	France - West	s.t.
6	Francis Pipelin (FRA)	France - West	s.t.
7	Jean Bobet (FRA)	France - Île-de-France	s.t.
8	Manuel Aizpuru (ESP)	Spain	s.t.
9	François Mahé (FRA)	France	s.t.
10	Piet van Est (NED)	Netherlands	+ 41"

General classification after stage 9

Rank	Rider	Team	Time
1	Jean Forestier (FRA)	France	49h 49' 54"
2	Jacques Anquetil (FRA)	France	+ 2' 39"
3	Fernand Picot (FRA)	France - West	+ 5' 04"
4	Jean Bobet (FRA)	France - Île-de-France	+ 10' 05"
5	François Mahé (FRA)	France	+ 10' 23"
6	Wim van Est (NED)	Netherlands	+ 11' 54"
7	Jef Planckaert (BEL)	Belgium	+ 12' 34"
8	Marcel Rohrbach (FRA)	France - North-East/Centre	+ 15' 10"
9	Marcel Janssens (BEL)	Belgium	+ 15' 29"
10	Jesús Loroño (ESP)	Spain	+ 18' 21"

== Rest Day 1 ==
6 July 1957 - Thonon-les-Bains

== Stage 10 ==
7 July 1957 - Thonon-les-Bains to Briançon, 247 km (153 mi)

Stage 10 result

Rank	Rider	Team	Time
1	Gastone Nencini (ITA)	Italy	7h 48' 26"
2	Marcel Janssens (BEL)	Belgium	s.t.
3	Marcel Rohrbach (FRA)	France - North-East/Centre	+ 39"
4	Max Schellenberg (SUI)	Switzerland	+ 1' 18"
5	Jacques Anquetil (FRA)	France	s.t.
6	Jesús Loroño (ESP)	Spain	+ 5' 32"
7	Gilbert Bauvin (FRA)	France	+ 5' 34"
8	Valentin Huot (FRA)	France - South-West	+ 5' 51"
9	Nino Defilippis (ITA)	Italy	+ 6' 02"
10	Fernand Picot (FRA)	France - West	+ 6' 10"

General classification after stage 10

Rank	Rider	Team	Time
1	Jacques Anquetil (FRA)	France	57h 42' 17"
2	Jean Forestier (FRA)	France	+ 4' 02"
3	Fernand Picot (FRA)	France - West	+ 7' 17"
4	Marcel Janssens (BEL)	Belgium	+ 11' 02"
5	Marcel Rohrbach (FRA)	France - North-East/Centre	+ 11' 52"
6	Jean Bobet (FRA)	France - Île-de-France	+ 12' 20"
7	François Mahé (FRA)	France	+ 12' 36"
8	Wim van Est (NED)	Netherlands	+ 15' 51"
9	Max Schellenberg (SUI)	Switzerland	+ 16' 13"
10	Jef Planckaert (BEL)	Belgium	+ 19' 54"

== Stage 11 ==
8 July 1957 - Briançon to Cannes, 286 km (178 mi)

Stage 11 result

Rank	Rider	Team	Time
1	René Privat (FRA)	France	9h 18' 59"
2	Nello Lauredi (FRA)	France - South-East	s.t.
3	Wim van Est (NED)	Netherlands	s.t.
4	Adolf Christian (AUT)	Switzerland	+ 1' 08"
5	Arigo Padovan (ITA)	Italy	s.t.
6	Fernand Picot (FRA)	France - West	+ 1' 54"
7	Nicolas Barone (FRA)	France - Île-de-France	s.t.
8	Gastone Nencini (ITA)	Italy	s.t.
9	Gerrit Voorting (NED)	Netherlands	s.t.
10	Jef Planckaert (BEL)	Belgium	s.t.

General classification after stage 11

Rank	Rider	Team	Time
1	Jacques Anquetil (FRA)	France	67h 03' 10"
2	Jean Forestier (FRA)	France	+ 4' 02"
3	Fernand Picot (FRA)	France - West	+ 7' 17"
4	Marcel Janssens (BEL)	Belgium	+ 11' 02"
5	Jean Bobet (FRA)	France - Île-de-France	+ 12' 20"
6	Wim van Est (NED)	Netherlands	+ 13' 57"
7	Marcel Rohrbach (FRA)	France - North-East/Centre	+ 16' 11"
8	François Mahé (FRA)	France	+ 17' 29"
9	Jef Planckaert (BEL)	Belgium	+ 19' 54"
10	Max Schellenberg (SUI)	Switzerland	+ 20' 32"
