= 1957 Tour de France, Stage 12 to Stage 22 =

Cycling race stages

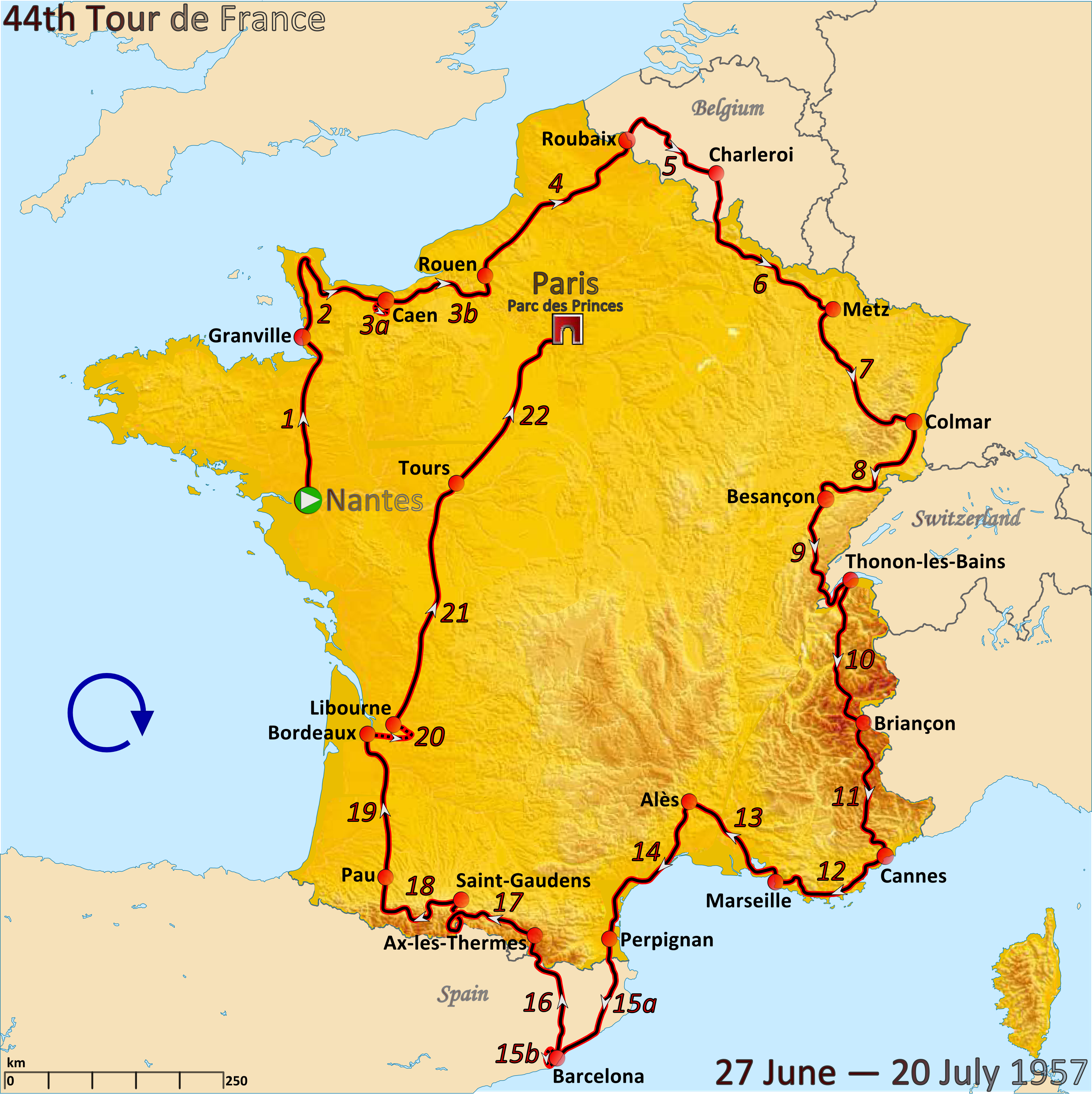
Route of the 1957 Tour de France

The 1957 Tour de France was the 44th edition of Tour de France, one of cycling's Grand Tours. The Tour began in Nantes with a flat stage on 27 June and Stage 12 occurred on 9 July with a mountainous stage from Cannes. The race finished in Paris on 20 July.

== Stage 12 ==
9 July 1957 - Cannes to Marseille, 239 km (148.5 mi)

Stage 12 result

Rank	Rider	Team	Time
1	Jean Stablinski (FRA)	France	7h 42' 32"
2	Lothar Friedrich (FRG)	Luxembourg/Mixed	+ 12' 04"
3	Louis Bergaud (FRA)	France	s.t.
4	Jean Forestier (FRA)	France	+ 13' 52"
5	Gastone Nencini (ITA)	Italy	s.t.
6	Marcel Janssens (BEL)	Belgium	s.t.
7	Jacques Anquetil (FRA)	France	s.t.
8	Nicolas Barone (FRA)	France - Île-de-France	s.t.
9	Wim van Est (NED)	Netherlands	s.t.
10	Francis Siguenza (FRA)	France - South-East	s.t.

General classification after stage 12

Rank	Rider	Team	Time
1	Jacques Anquetil (FRA)	France	74h 59' 54"
2	Jean Forestier (FRA)	France	+ 4' 02"
3	Marcel Janssens (BEL)	Belgium	+ 11' 02"
4	Fernand Picot (FRA)	France - West	+ 11' 50"
5	Wim van Est (NED)	Netherlands	+ 13' 57"
6	Marcel Rohrbach (FRA)	France - North-East/Centre	+ 16' 11"
7	Jean Bobet (FRA)	France - Île-de-France	+ 16' 53"
8	Jef Planckaert (BEL)	Belgium	+ 19' 54"
9	Gastone Nencini (ITA)	Italy	+ 20' 44"
10	François Mahé (FRA)	France	+ 22' 02"

== Stage 13 ==
10 July 1957 - Marseille to Alès, 160 km (99 mi) (team time trial)

Stage 13 result

Rank	Rider	Team	Time
1	Nino Defilippis (ITA)	Italy	5h 02' 54"
2	Jean Stablinski (FRA)	France	s.t.
3	André Darrigade (FRA)	France	s.t.
4	Piet van Est (NED)	Netherlands	s.t.
5	Nicolas Barone (FRA)	France - Île-de-France	s.t.
6	Joseph Groussard (FRA)	France - West	s.t.
7	Walter Favre (SUI)	Switzerland	s.t.
8	Gilbert Bauvin (FRA)	France	s.t.
9	Jan Adriaensens (BEL)	Belgium	s.t.
10	Jesús Loroño (ESP)	Spain	s.t.

General classification after stage 13

Rank	Rider	Team	Time
1	Jacques Anquetil (FRA)	France	80h 13' 28"
2	Jean Forestier (FRA)	France	+ 4' 02"
3	Marcel Janssens (BEL)	Belgium	+ 11' 02"
4	Fernand Picot (FRA)	France - West	+ 11' 50"
5	Wim van Est (NED)	Netherlands	+ 13' 57"
6	Gilbert Bauvin (FRA)	France	+ 14' 00"
7	Marcel Rohrbach (FRA)	France - North-East/Centre	+ 16' 11"
8	Jean Bobet (FRA)	France - Île-de-France	+ 16' 53"
9	Jesús Loroño (ESP)	Spain	+ 18' 08"
10	Nicolas Barone (FRA)	France - Île-de-France	+ 18' 38"

== Stage 14 ==
11 July 1957 - Alès to Perpignan, 246 km (153 mi)

Stage 14 result

Rank	Rider	Team	Time
1	Roger Hassenforder (FRA)	France - North-East/Centre	6h 17' 23"
2	Arigo Padovan (ITA)	Italy	s.t.
3	Joseph Groussard (FRA)	France - West	s.t.
4	Raymond Hoorelbeke (FRA)	France - Île-de-France	s.t.
5	Adolf Christian (AUT)	Switzerland	s.t.
6	Gerrit Voorting (NED)	Netherlands	s.t.
7	Pierre Ruby (FRA)	France - North-East/Centre	s.t.
8	Mario Tosato (ITA)	Italy	s.t.
9	José da Silva (POR)	Luxembourg/Mixed	s.t.
10	Antonin Rolland (FRA)	France - North-East/Centre	s.t.

General classification after stage 14

Rank	Rider	Team	Time
1	Jacques Anquetil (FRA)	France	86h 47' 12"
2	Jean Forestier (FRA)	France	+ 4' 02"
3	François Mahé (FRA)	France	+ 5' 41"
4	Adolf Christian (AUT)	Switzerland	+ 9' 44"
5	Marcel Janssens (BEL)	Belgium	+ 11' 02"
6	Fernand Picot (FRA)	France - West	+ 11' 50"
7	Wim van Est (NED)	Netherlands	+ 13' 57"
8	Gilbert Bauvin (FRA)	France	+ 14' 00"
9	Marcel Rohrbach (FRA)	France - North-East/Centre	+ 16' 41"
10	Jean Bobet (FRA)	France - Île-de-France	+ 16' 53"

== Stage 15a ==
12 July 1957 - Perpignan to Barcelona, 197 km (122 mi)

Stage 15a result

Rank	Rider	Team	Time
1	René Privat (FRA)	France	5h 24' 47"
2	André Darrigade (FRA)	France	+ 38"
3	Gilbert Bauvin (FRA)	France	+ 50"
4	Bernardo Ruiz (ESP)	Spain	s.t.
5	Maurice Lampre (FRA)	France - South-West	+ 1' 00"
6	Pierre Ruby (FRA)	France - North-East/Centre	s.t.
7	Pierre Poulingue (FRA)	France - West	+ 1' 07"
8	Nino Defilippis (ITA)	Italy	+ 1' 10"
9	Pierino Baffi (ITA)	Italy	+ 4' 15"
10	Jean Forestier (FRA)	France	s.t.

General classification after stage 15a

Rank	Rider	Team	Time
1	Jacques Anquetil (FRA)	France	92h 16' 30"
2	Jean Forestier (FRA)	France	+ 3' 46"
3	François Mahé (FRA)	France	+ 5' 41"
4	Adolf Christian (AUT)	Switzerland	+ 9' 44"
5	Gilbert Bauvin (FRA)	France	+ 10' 19"
6	Marcel Janssens (BEL)	Belgium	+ 11' 02"
7	Fernand Picot (FRA)	France - West	+ 11' 50"
8	Wim van Est (NED)	Netherlands	+ 13' 57"
9	Nino Defilippis (ITA)	Italy	+ 16' 11"
10	Marcel Rohrbach (FRA)	France - North-East/Centre	+ 16' 41"

== Stage 15b ==
12 July 1957 - Montjuïc circuit, 9.8 km (6.1 mi) (ITT)

Stage 15b result

Rank	Rider	Team	Time
1	Jacques Anquetil (FRA)	France	14' 29"
2	Jean Forestier (FRA)	France	+ 12"
3	Jesús Loroño (ESP)	Spain	+ 25"
4	Gilbert Bauvin (FRA)	France	+ 32"
5	Wim van Est (NED)	Netherlands	+ 36"
6	Nino Defilippis (ITA)	Italy	+ 39"
7	Marcel Rohrbach (FRA)	France - North-East/Centre	+ 41"
8	François Mahé (FRA)	France	+ 45"
9	Adolf Christian (AUT)	Switzerland	+ 50"
10	Piet van Est (NED)	Netherlands	s.t.

General classification after stage 15b

Rank	Rider	Team	Time
1	Jacques Anquetil (FRA)	France	92h 30' 59"
2	Jean Forestier (FRA)	France	+ 3' 58"
3	François Mahé (FRA)	France	+ 6' 26"
4	Adolf Christian (AUT)	Switzerland	+ 10' 34"
5	Gilbert Bauvin (FRA)	France	+ 10' 51"
6	Marcel Janssens (BEL)	Belgium	+ 11' 54"
7	Fernand Picot (FRA)	France - West	+ 13' 15"
8	Wim van Est (NED)	Netherlands	+ 14' 33"
9	Nino Defilippis (ITA)	Italy	+ 16' 50"
10	Marcel Rohrbach (FRA)	France - North-East/Centre	+ 17' 22"

== Rest Day 2 ==
13 July 1957 - Bayonne

== Stage 16 ==
14 July 1957 - Barcelona to Ax-les-Thermes, 220 km (140 mi)

Stage 16 result

Rank	Rider	Team	Time
1	Jean Bourlès (FRA)	France - West	6h 13' 34"
2	Marcel Queheille (FRA)	France - South-West	+ 4' 03"
3	Arigo Padovan (ITA)	Italy	+ 9' 19"
4	Jef Planckaert (BEL)	Belgium	+ 10' 07"
5	Mario Bertolo (ITA)	France - North-East/Centre	+ 10' 25"
6	Georges Gay (FRA)	France - South-West	+ 11' 27"
7	Pino Cerami (BEL)	Belgium	+ 11' 29"
8	Adolf Christian (AUT)	Switzerland	s.t.
9	Michel Stolker (NED)	Netherlands	s.t.
10	Jean Forestier (FRA)	France	s.t.

General classification after stage 16

Rank	Rider	Team	Time
1	Jacques Anquetil (FRA)	France	98h 56' 14"
2	Jean Forestier (FRA)	France	+ 3' 46"
3	François Mahé (FRA)	France	+ 6' 19"
4	Adolf Christian (AUT)	Switzerland	+ 10' 22"
5	Gilbert Bauvin (FRA)	France	+ 10' 48"
6	Marcel Janssens (BEL)	Belgium	+ 11' 52"
7	Fernand Picot (FRA)	France - West	+ 13' 03"
8	Wim van Est (NED)	Netherlands	+ 14' 26"
9	Nino Defilippis (ITA)	Italy	+ 16' 47"
10	Jesús Loroño (ESP)	Spain	+ 18' 41"

== Stage 17 ==
15 July 1957 - Ax-les-Thermes to Saint-Gaudens, 236 km (147 mi)

Stage 17 result

Rank	Rider	Team	Time
1	Nino Defilippis (ITA)	Italy	7h 00' 06"
2	Jean Forestier (FRA)	France	s.t.
3	Pierino Baffi (ITA)	Italy	s.t.
4	Louis Bergaud (FRA)	France	s.t.
5	Max Schellenberg (SUI)	Switzerland	s.t.
6	Désiré Keteleer (BEL)	Belgium	s.t.
7	Adolf Christian (AUT)	Switzerland	s.t.
8	Jesús Loroño (ESP)	Spain	+ 5"
9	Marcel Janssens (BEL)	Belgium	s.t.
10	Jan Adriaensens (BEL)	Belgium	s.t.

General classification after stage 17

Rank	Rider	Team	Time
1	Jacques Anquetil (FRA)	France	105h 56' 25"
2	Jean Forestier (FRA)	France	+ 3' 11"
3	François Mahé (FRA)	France	+ 6' 19"
4	Adolf Christian (AUT)	Switzerland	+ 10' 17"
5	Gilbert Bauvin (FRA)	France	+ 10' 48"
6	Marcel Janssens (BEL)	Belgium	+ 11' 52"
7	Wim van Est (NED)	Netherlands	+ 14' 26"
8	Nino Defilippis (ITA)	Italy	+ 15' 42"
9	Jesús Loroño (ESP)	Spain	+ 18' 41"
10	Gastone Nencini (ITA)	Italy	+ 22' 21"

== Stage 18 ==
16 July 1957 - Saint-Gaudens to Pau, 207 km (129 mi)

Stage 18 result

Rank	Rider	Team	Time
1	Gastone Nencini (ITA)	Italy	6h 37' 31"
2	Georges Gay (FRA)	France - South-West	s.t.
3	Marcel Janssens (BEL)	Belgium	s.t.
4	Jesús Loroño (ESP)	Spain	s.t.
5	Jean Dotto (FRA)	France - South-East	s.t.
6	Jan Adriaensens (BEL)	Belgium	+ 5"
7	Henry Anglade (FRA)	France - South-East	+ 2' 38"
8	Arigo Padovan (ITA)	Italy	s.t.
9	Jacques Anquetil (FRA)	France	s.t.
10	Adolf Christian (AUT)	Switzerland	s.t.

General classification after stage 18

Rank	Rider	Team	Time
1	Jacques Anquetil (FRA)	France	112h 36' 34"
2	Marcel Janssens (BEL)	Belgium	+ 9' 14"
3	Adolf Christian (AUT)	Switzerland	+ 10' 17"
4	Jean Forestier (FRA)	France	+ 12' 59"
5	Jesús Loroño (ESP)	Spain	+ 16' 03"
6	Gastone Nencini (ITA)	Italy	+ 18' 43"
7	Wim van Est (NED)	Netherlands	+ 24' 14"
8	Nino Defilippis (ITA)	Italy	+ 25' 16"
9	Jan Adriaensens (BEL)	Belgium	+ 26' 18"
10	Jean Dotto (FRA)	France - South-East	+ 28' 30"

== Stage 19 ==
17 July 1957 - Pau to Bordeaux, 194 km (121 mi)

Stage 19 result

Rank	Rider	Team	Time
1	Pierino Baffi (ITA)	Italy	5h 04' 22"
2	André Darrigade (FRA)	France	+ 21' 48"
3	Arigo Padovan (ITA)	Italy	s.t.
4	Mario Baroni (ITA)	Italy	s.t.
5	Maurice Lampre (FRA)	France - South-West	s.t.
6	André Dupré (FRA)	France - South-West	s.t.
7	Wim van Est (NED)	Netherlands	s.t.
8	Jean Forestier (FRA)	France	s.t.
9	Francis Siguenza (FRA)	France - South-East	s.t.
10	Fernand Picot (FRA)	France - West	s.t.

General classification after stage 19

Rank	Rider	Team	Time
1	Jacques Anquetil (FRA)	France	118h 02' 44"
2	Marcel Janssens (BEL)	Belgium	+ 9' 14"
3	Adolf Christian (AUT)	Switzerland	+ 10' 17"
4	Jean Forestier (FRA)	France	+ 12' 59"
5	Jesús Loroño (ESP)	Spain	+ 16' 03"
6	Gastone Nencini (ITA)	Italy	+ 18' 43"
7	Wim van Est (NED)	Netherlands	+ 24' 14"
8	Nino Defilippis (ITA)	Italy	+ 25' 16"
9	Jan Adriaensens (BEL)	Belgium	+ 26' 18"
10	Jean Dotto (FRA)	France - South-East	+ 28' 30"

== Stage 20 ==
18 July 1957 - Bordeaux to Libourne, 66 km (41 mi) (ITT)

Stage 20 result

Rank	Rider	Team	Time
1	Jacques Anquetil (FRA)	France	1h 32' 17"
2	Nino Defilippis (ITA)	Italy	+ 2' 11"
3	Wim van Est (NED)	Netherlands	+ 2' 56"
4	Jesús Loroño (ESP)	Spain	+ 3' 14"
5	Jean Forestier (FRA)	France	+ 4' 03"
6	Jef Planckaert (BEL)	Belgium	+ 4' 07"
7	Pierre Ruby (FRA)	France - North-East/Centre	+ 4' 13"
8	Marcel Janssens (BEL)	Belgium	+ 4' 42"
9	François Mahé (FRA)	France	+ 4' 58"
10	Désiré Keteleer (BEL)	Belgium	+ 5' 55"

General classification after stage 20

Rank	Rider	Team	Time
1	Jacques Anquetil (FRA)	France	119h 34' 01"
2	Marcel Janssens (BEL)	Belgium	+ 14' 56"
3	Adolf Christian (AUT)	Switzerland	+ 17' 20"
4	Jean Forestier (FRA)	France	+ 18' 02"
5	Jesús Loroño (ESP)	Spain	+ 20' 17"
6	Gastone Nencini (ITA)	Italy	+ 26' 03"
7	Nino Defilippis (ITA)	Italy	+ 27' 57"
8	Wim van Est (NED)	Netherlands	+ 28' 10"
9	Jan Adriaensens (BEL)	Belgium	+ 34' 07"
10	Jean Dotto (FRA)	France - South-East	+ 36' 31"

== Stage 21 ==
19 July 1957 - Libourne to Tours, 317 km (197 mi)

Stage 21 result

Rank	Rider	Team	Time
1	André Darrigade (FRA)	France	9h 56' 53"
2	Arigo Padovan (ITA)	Italy	s.t.
3	Désiré Keteleer (BEL)	Belgium	s.t.
4	Jaap Kersten (NED)	Netherlands	s.t.
5	Piet De Jongh (NED)	Netherlands	s.t.
6	Louis Bergaud (FRA)	France	s.t.
7	Henry Anglade (FRA)	France - South-East	+ 10"
8	Francis Siguenza (FRA)	France - South-East	+ 14' 54"
9	Pierre Ruby (FRA)	France - North-East/Centre	s.t.
10	Piet van Est (NED)	Netherlands	s.t.

General classification after stage 21

Rank	Rider	Team	Time
1	Jacques Anquetil (FRA)	France	129h 46' 11"
2	Marcel Janssens (BEL)	Belgium	+ 14' 56"
3	Adolf Christian (AUT)	Switzerland	+ 17' 20"
4	Jean Forestier (FRA)	France	+ 18' 02"
5	Jesús Loroño (ESP)	Spain	+ 20' 17"
6	Gastone Nencini (ITA)	Italy	+ 26' 03"
7	Nino Defilippis (ITA)	Italy	+ 27' 57"
8	Wim van Est (NED)	Netherlands	+ 28' 10"
9	Jan Adriaensens (BEL)	Belgium	+ 34' 07"
10	Jean Dotto (FRA)	France - South-East	+ 36' 31"

== Stage 22 ==
20 July 1957 - Tours to Paris, 227 km (141 mi)

Stage 22 result

Rank	Rider	Team	Time
1	André Darrigade (FRA)	France	5h 58' 31"
2	Arigo Padovan (ITA)	Italy	s.t.
3	Jean Forestier (FRA)	France	s.t.
4	Wim van Est (NED)	Netherlands	s.t.
5	Maurice Lampre (FRA)	France - South-West	s.t.
6	Francis Siguenza (FRA)	France - South-East	s.t.
7	Piet van Est (NED)	Netherlands	s.t.
8	Jef Planckaert (BEL)	Belgium	s.t.
9	Pino Cerami (BEL)	Belgium	s.t.
10	Joseph Groussard (FRA)	France - West	s.t.

General classification after stage 22

Rank	Rider	Team	Time
1	Jacques Anquetil (FRA)	France	135h 44' 42"
2	Marcel Janssens (BEL)	Belgium	+ 14' 56"
3	Adolf Christian (AUT)	Switzerland	+ 17' 20"
4	Jean Forestier (FRA)	France	+ 18' 02"
5	Jesús Loroño (ESP)	Spain	+ 20' 17"
6	Gastone Nencini (ITA)	Italy	+ 26' 03"
7	Nino Defilippis (ITA)	Italy	+ 27' 57"
8	Wim van Est (NED)	Netherlands	+ 28' 10"
9	Jan Adriaensens (BEL)	Belgium	+ 34' 07"
10	Jean Dotto (FRA)	France - South-East	+ 36' 31"
