= 1957 Tour de France =

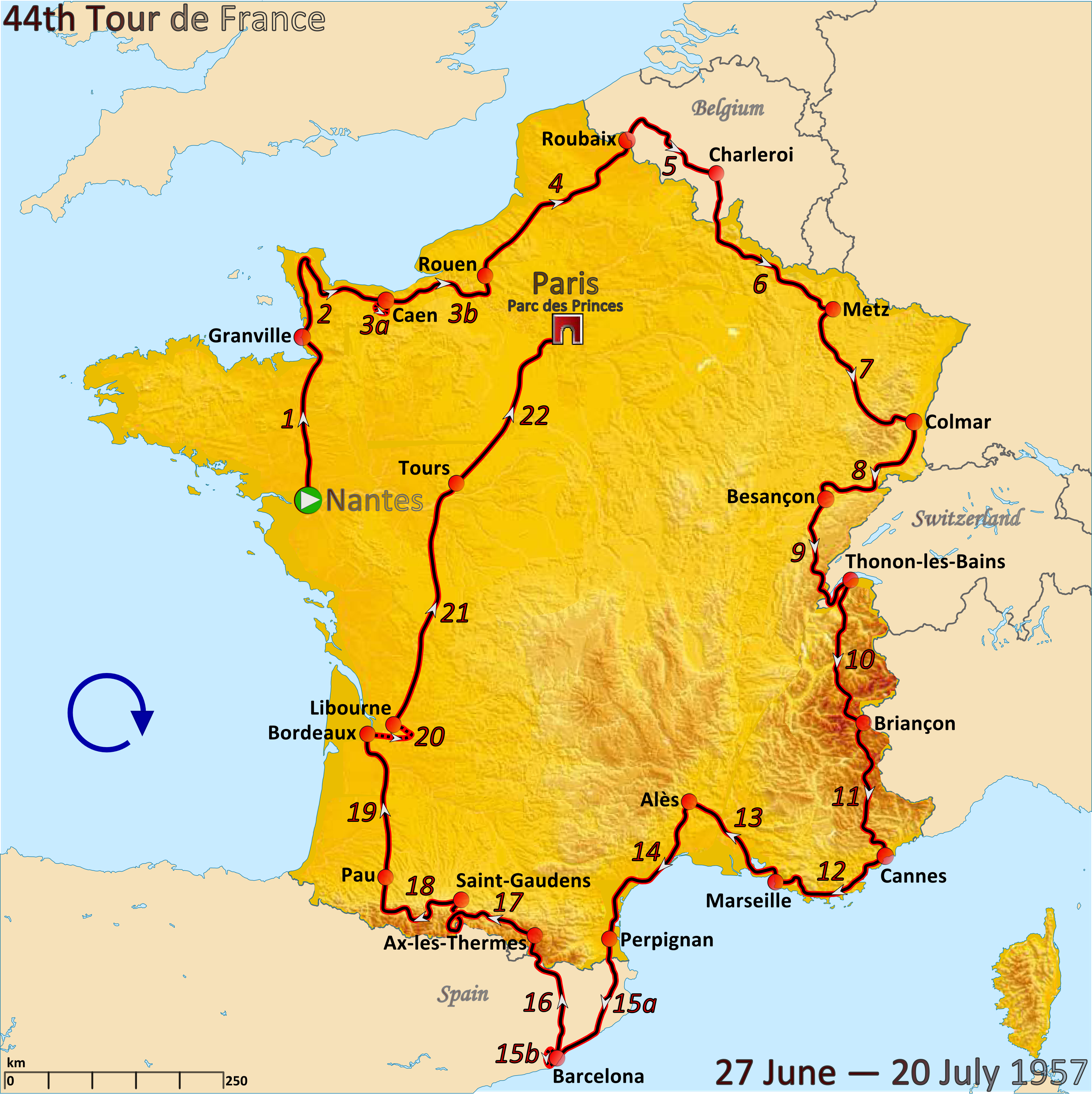
- Route of the 1957 Tour de France followed clockwise, starting in Nantes and finishing in Paris

Race details
- Dates: 27 June – 20 July 1957
- Stages: 22
- Distance: 4,669 km (2,901 mi)
- Winning time: 135h 44' 42"

Results
Jersey awarded to the overall winner	Winner	Jacques Anquetil (FRA)	(France)
	Second	Marcel Janssens (BEL)	(Belgium)
	Third	Adolf Christian (AUT)	(Switzerland)
Jersey awarded to the points classification winner	Points	Jean Forestier (FRA)	(France)
	Mountains	Gastone Nencini (ITA)	(Italy)
	Combativity	Nicolas Barone (FRA)	(Île-de-France)
	Team	France	

The 1957 Tour de France was the 44th edition of the Tour de France, taking place from 27 June to 20 July. It was composed of 22 stages over 4,669 km (2,901 mi).

The 1957 Tour was the first win for Jacques Anquetil, who won the Tour five times over his career.

The French national team was very successful in the 1957 Tour de France; not only did they provide the winning cyclist, they also won the team classification, and almost every daily team classification. They lost only one cyclist (the previous year's winner Roger Walkowiak), and had the stage winner 12 times. They had Forestier winning the points classification, and Bergaud second in the mountains classification. Only once they did not have the yellow jersey for the leader in the general classification, when Barone took it after the seventh stage.

== Innovations and changes ==
The Tour organisation had a conflict with the French television, and as a result there had almost been no live television coverage of the 1957 Tour de France. At the last moment the organisers and the broadcaster agreed on how much the coverage rights would cost, and the race was broadcast. For the other journalists, the conditions improved: a mobile press room with modern communication equipment was installed, so the journalists had the best conditions to report.

The cut-off time, which had been set at 10% of the winner in 1956, was reduced to 8% of the winner in 1957. In the seventh and eighth stage it would be 10% of the winner, while in stages 10, 11, 16, 17 and 18 the cut-off time would be 12% of the winner. In each stage, if the number of cyclists removed from the race would be more than 15% of the cyclists that started the stage, the cut-off time would be increased by 2%. The goal of this reduction in cut-off time was to make the race tougher.

For the first time since the introduction of the national team format in 1930, the riders were allowed to have advertising on their jerseys.

== Teams ==
The teams entering the race were:

- France
- Belgium
- Italy
- Netherlands
- Spain
- Luxembourg/Mixed
- Switzerland
- West
- South-East
- North-East/Centre
- South-West
- Île-de-France

== Pre-race favourites ==
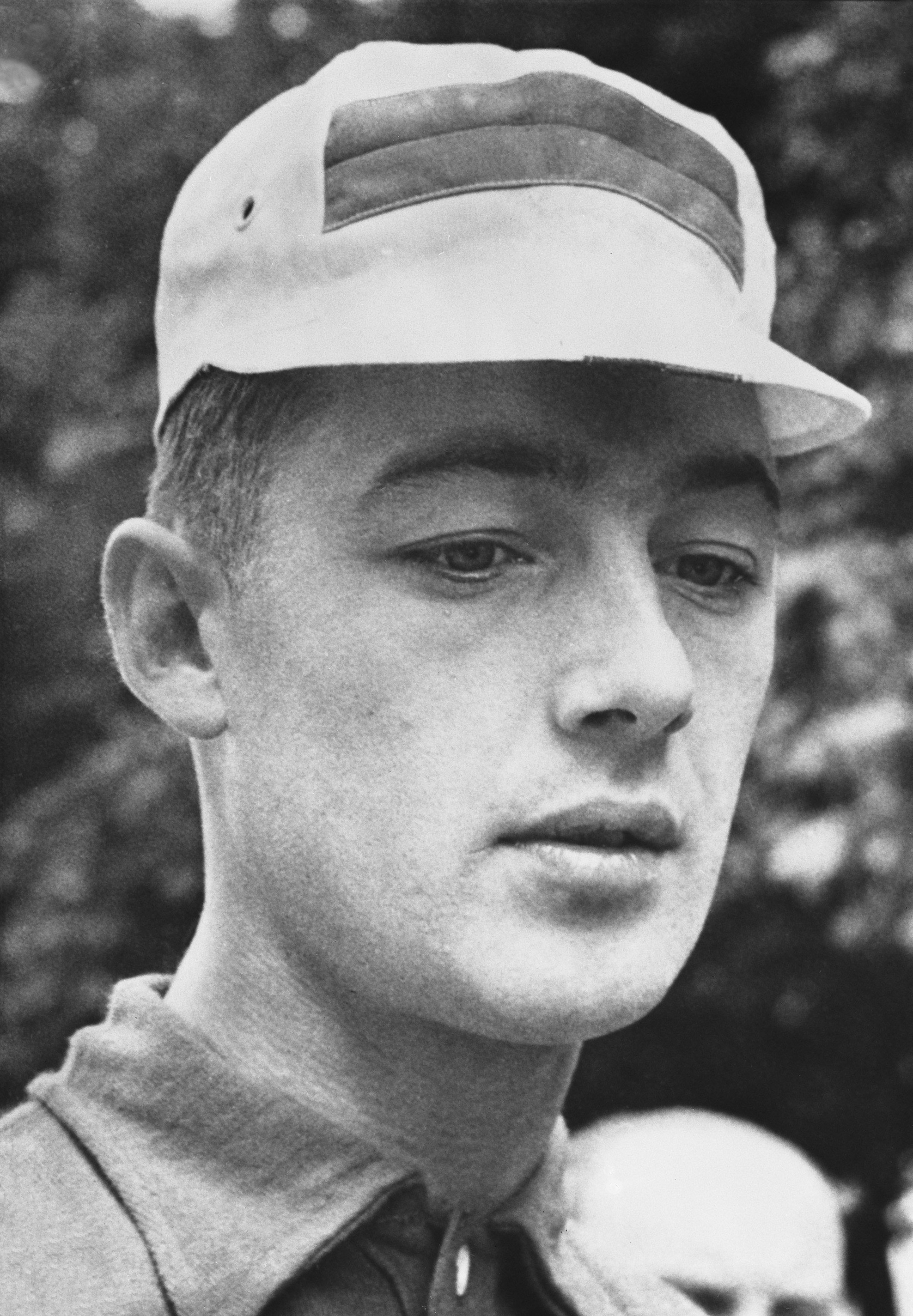
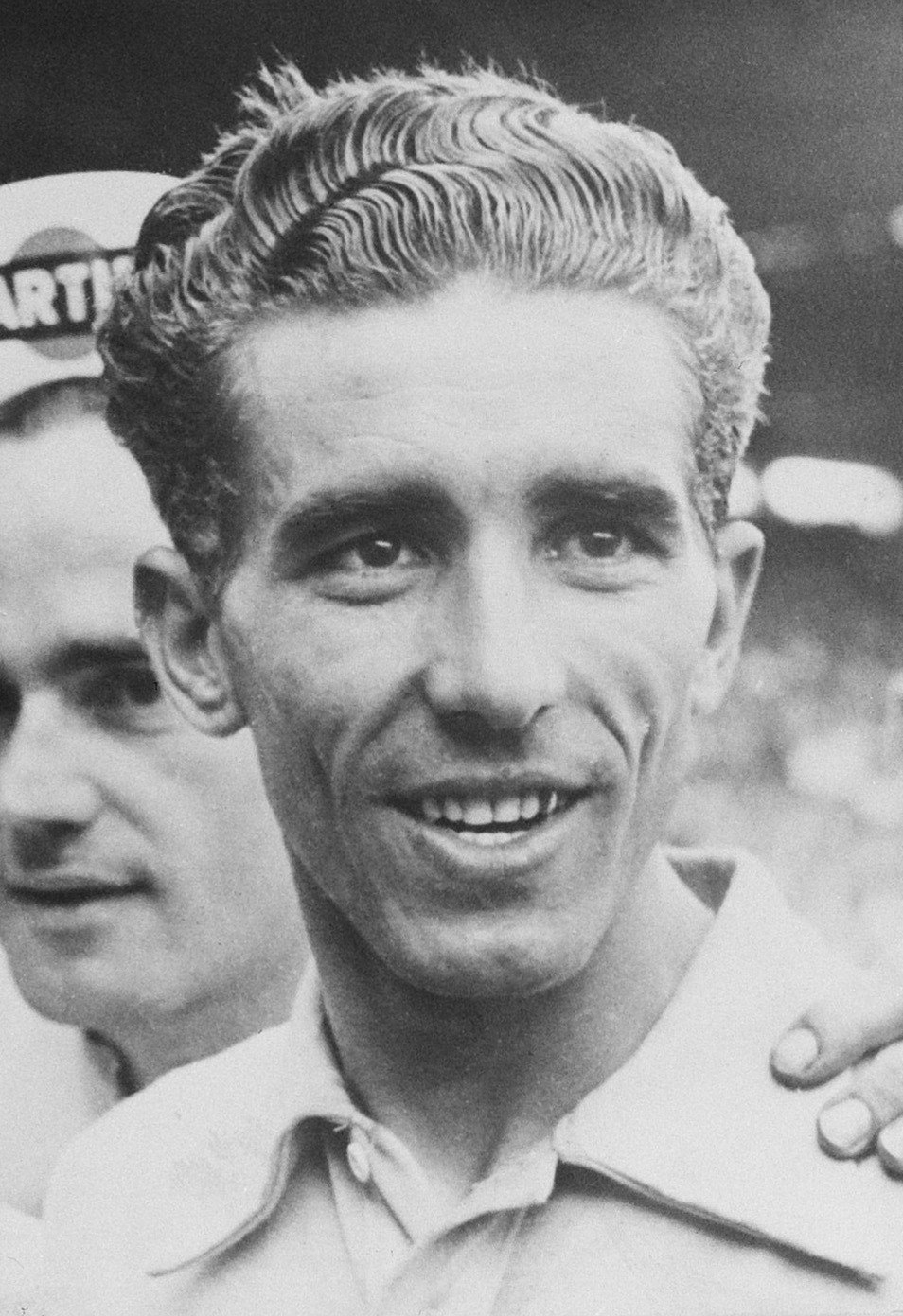
Pre-race favourites Charly Gaul (pictured in 1962) and Federico Bahamontes (pictured in 1962)

The route of the 1957 Tour de France contained many mountains, so mountain specialists Charly Gaul and Federico Bahamontes were considered favourites. Gaul had requested to ride in the Dutch team, but this was not allowed.

Louison Bobet and Raphael Géminiani, two important French cyclists, did not race in 1957, so the French team needed new stars. The team was then built around young Jacques Anquetil, who had broken the hour record earlier that year.

The riders who had been favourites in previous years had stopped (Fausto Coppi), had lost their greatness (Hugo Koblet), or had chosen not to participate (Louison Bobet). As a result, there was no accepted favourite. Roger Walkowiak, who had won the previous edition, had not shown good results since. Charly Gaul had lost the 1957 Giro d'Italia when he was almost sure of winning it, so he was not considered to be in great form. Gastone Nencini, who won the 1957 Giro, was not considered constant enough. The Spanish team was considered the best Spanish team ever, but they were more favored for the mountain classification than for the general classification. And the Belgian team was focussed around Jan Adriaensens.

== Route and stages ==
The 1957 Tour de France started on 27 June, and had two rest days, in Thonon-les-Bains and Barcelona, although the second rest day had a short time trial of less than 10 km. The highest point of elevation in the race was 2,556 m (8,386 ft) at the summit tunnel of the Col du Galibier mountain pass on stage 10.

Every stage had a winning cyclist (the cyclist who crossed the finish line first, or in case of a time trial who took the shortest time to complete the course) and a team that wins the daily team classification (the team of which the three best cyclists had the lowest accumulated time). The cyclist who wins the stage therefore is not always part of the team that wins the daily team classification. In 1957, the split stages were numbered differently: the third stage consisted of the team time trial and the stage from Caen to Rouen but they were not called 3a and 3b; the fifteenth stage was only the stage from Perpignan to Barcelona, and the short individual time trial was referred to as the time trial between stage 15 and 16, without number.

Stage characteristics and winners
Stage	Date	Course	Distance	Type	Winner
1	27 June	Nantes to Granville	204 km (127 mi)	Plain stage	André Darrigade (FRA)
2	28 June	Granville to Caen	226 km (140 mi)	Plain stage	René Privat (FRA)
3a	29 June	Circuit de la Prairie, Caen	15 km (9.3 mi)	Team time trial	France
3b	29 June	Caen to Rouen	134 km (83 mi)	Plain stage	Jacques Anquetil (FRA)
4	30 June	Rouen to Roubaix	232 km (144 mi)	Plain stage	Marcel Janssens (BEL)
5	1 July	Roubaix to Charleroi	170 km (110 mi)	Plain stage	Gilbert Bauvin (FRA)
6	2 July	Charleroi to Metz	248 km (154 mi)	Plain stage	André Trochut (FRA)
7	3 July	Metz to Colmar	223 km (139 mi)	Stage with mountain(s)	Roger Hassenforder (FRA)
8	4 July	Colmar to Besançon	192 km (119 mi)	Plain stage	Pierino Baffi (ITA)
9	5 July	Besançon to Thonon-les-Bains	188 km (117 mi)	Plain stage	Jacques Anquetil (FRA)
	6 July	Thonon-les-Bains		Rest day	
10	7 July	Thonon-les-Bains to Briançon	247 km (153 mi)	Stage with mountain(s)	Gastone Nencini (ITA)
11	8 July	Briançon to Cannes	286 km (178 mi)	Stage with mountain(s)	René Privat (FRA)
12	9 July	Cannes to Marseille	239 km (149 mi)	Stage with mountain(s)	Jean Stablinski (FRA)
13	10 July	Marseille to Alès	160 km (99 mi)	Plain stage	Nino Defilippis (ITA)
14	11 July	Alès to Perpignan	246 km (153 mi)	Plain stage	Roger Hassenforder (FRA)
15a	12 July	Perpignan to Barcelona (Spain)	197 km (122 mi)	Plain stage	René Privat (FRA)
15b	13 July	Montjuïc circuit (Spain)	9.8 km (6.1 mi)	Individual time trial	Jacques Anquetil (FRA)
	13 July	Barcelona		Rest day	
16	14 July	Barcelona (Spain) to Ax-les-Thermes	220 km (140 mi)	Stage with mountain(s)	Jean Bourlès (FRA)
17	15 July	Ax-les-Thermes to Saint-Gaudens	236 km (147 mi)	Stage with mountain(s)	Nino Defilippis (ITA)
18	16 July	Saint-Gaudens to Pau	207 km (129 mi)	Stage with mountain(s)	Gastone Nencini (ITA)
19	17 July	Pau to Bordeaux	194 km (121 mi)	Plain stage	Pierino Baffi (ITA)
20	18 July	Bordeaux to Libourne	66 km (41 mi)	Individual time trial	Jacques Anquetil (FRA)
21	19 July	Libourne to Tours	317 km (197 mi)	Plain stage	André Darrigade (FRA)
22	20 July	Tours to Paris	227 km (141 mi)	Plain stage	André Darrigade (FRA)
	Total		4,669 km (2,901 mi)		

== Race overview ==
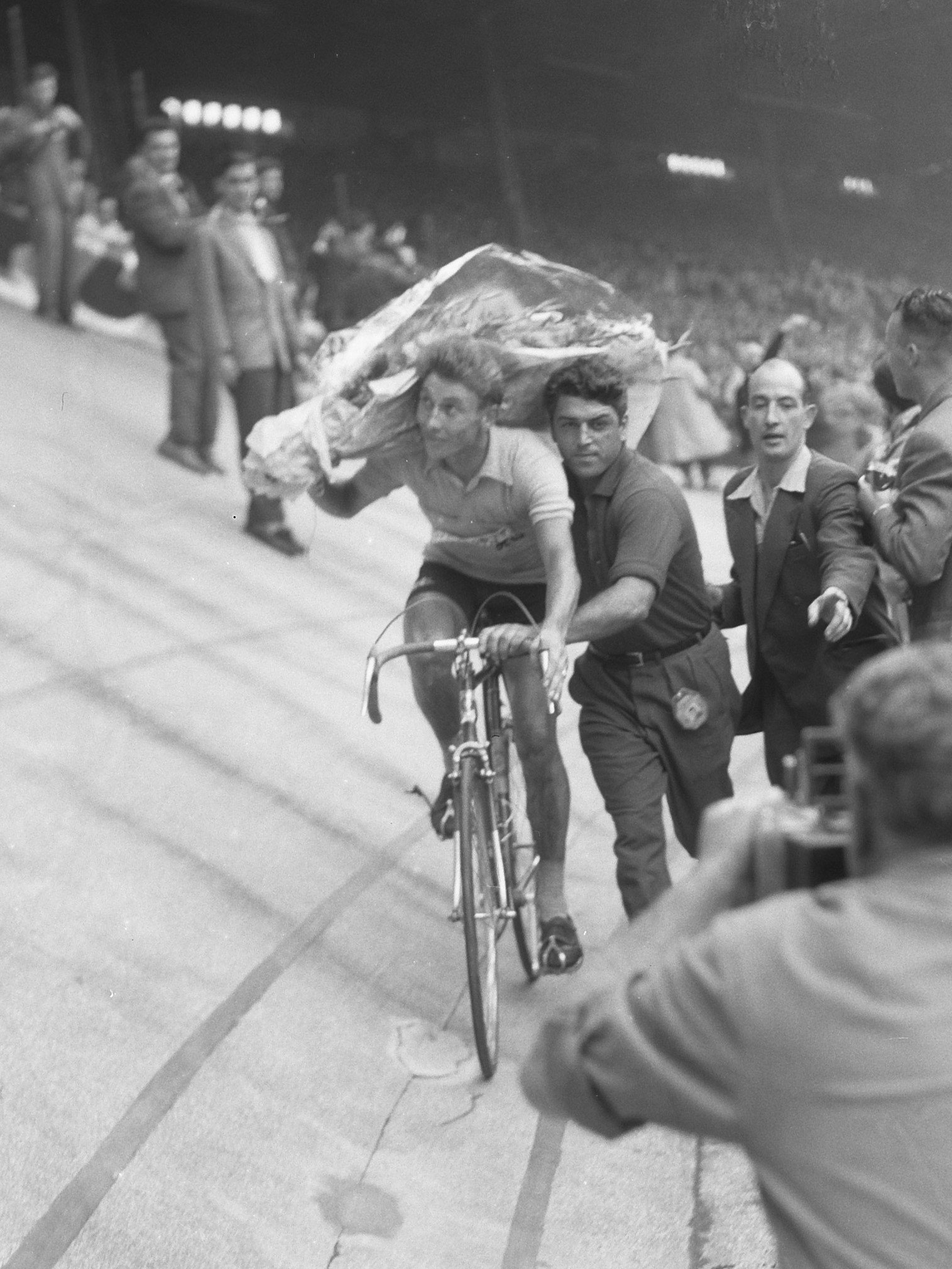
General classification winner Jacques Anquetil taking his victory lap at the end of the Tour in the Parc des Princes in Paris

The first stage was won by André Darrigade, who had also won the first stage in the previous edition. The first stages were run in hot weather, and many cyclists had to give up. After six stages, there were only 83 cyclists remaining, from the 120 that started.

In the second stage, Darrigade's teammate Privat took over the yellow jersey. The Luxembourg favourite, Charly Gaul, abandoned on that stage due to sickness.

In the fifth stage, French cyclist Jacques Anquetil took the lead in the general classification, so in the sixth stage he wore the yellow jersey for the first time in his career. It was too early in the race to defend that jersey, so two days later he allowed regional cyclist Nicolas Barone to take the yellow jersey. One day later the French national team took back the yellow jersey, when Jean Forestier took the lead by 15 minutes.

In the ninth stage, Spanish climber Bahamontes abandoned. In stage 10, the first mountain stage, Anquetil took the lead back. Although Gastone Nencini won the stage, Anquetil was only one and a half minute behind, which was enough. In the second mountain stage the riders remained calm, as the French team was superior and dominated the race.

In the second part of the fifteenth stage, a short time trial of 10 km, Anquetil won his first time trial in the Tour de France.

In the Pyrenées from stage 16 to stage 18, the attack on Anquetil's leading position did not take place. In stage 16 the weather turned bad, with cold, rain, hail and fog, which made the course dangerous. Several cyclists fell: Nello Lauredi broke his wrist and abandoned the race, and Stanislas Bober had to abandon due to a shoulder injury. The main victims of the bad weather were reporter Alex Virot and his motor cyclist René Wagner, who fell from their motor; Virot died on the spot, and the motor cyclist on the way to the hospital. It was the only accident that Wagner ever had in his career.

Before stage 18, the French team had the first three places in the general classification with Anquetil, Forestier and Mahé. In stage 18, the last mountain stage, Anquetil was in good shape, and he attacked early on. But in the food zone he missed his food bag, and some time later he was out of energy. Several cyclists passed him, but later in the stage Anquetil got help and finished only two and a half minutes after the winner Nencini.

Marcel Janssens and Adolf Christian were in the leading group, while Forestier and Mahé lost considerable time, so Janssens and Christian took the podium places. Anquetil was still leading, and nobody doubted that he would win the race, especially because there was still an individual time trial coming up, Anquetil's specialty. And indeed, Anquetil won that time trial with a margin of more than two minutes.

== Classification leadership and minor prizes ==
The time that each cyclist required to finish each stage was recorded, and these times were added together for the general classification. If a cyclist had received a time bonus, it was subtracted from this total; all time penalties were added to this total. The cyclist with the least accumulated time was the race leader, identified by the yellow jersey. Of the 120 cyclists that started the 1957 Tour de France, 56 finished the race.

The points classification in 1957 was calculated in the same way as since the introduction in 1953, following the calculation method from the Tours de France from 1905 to 1912. Points were given according to the ranking of the stage: the winner received one point, the next cyclist two points, and so on. These points were added, and the cyclist with the fewest points was the leader of the points classification. In 1957, this was won by Jean Forestier with 301 points. Over 22 stages (including two split stages), this meant that his average stage finish was approximately place 14.

Points for the mountains classification were earned by reaching the mountain tops first. The system was almost the same as in 1956: there were three types of mountain tops: the hardest ones, in category 1, gave 10 points to the first cyclist, the easier ones, in category 2, gave 6 points to the first cyclist, and the easiest ones, in category 3, gave 3 points. Gastone Nencini won this classification.

The team classification was calculated as the sum of the daily team classifications, and the daily team classification was calculated by adding the times in the stage result of the best three cyclists per team. It was won by the French team, with a large margin over the Italian team. The Luxembourg/Mixed team finished with only one cyclist, so they were not included in the team classification.

In addition, there was a combativity award given after each stage to the cyclist considered most combative. The split stages each had a combined winner. The decision was made by a jury composed of journalists who gave points. The cyclist with the most points from votes in all stages led the combativity classification.Nicolas Barone won this classification, and was given overall the super-combativity award. The Souvenir Henri Desgrange was given in honour of Tour founder Henri Desgrange to the first rider to pass a point by his final residence, the "Villa Mia" in Beauvallon, Grimaud, on the French Riviera on stage 12. This prize was won by Jean Stablinski.

Classification leadership by stage
Stage	Winner	General classification	Points classification	Mountains classification (Note: No jersey was awarded to the leader of the mountains classification until a white jersey with red polka dots was introduced in 1975.)	Team classification	Combativity		Bad luck award
Stage	Winner	General classification	Points classification	Mountains classification	Team classification	Award	Classification	Bad luck award
1	André Darrigade	André Darrigade	André Darrigade	no award	France	Gastone Nencini	Gastone Nencini	François Mahé
2	René Privat	René Privat	Joseph Thomin	no award	France	René Privat	René Privat	Alcide Vaucher
3a	France	René Privat	Joseph Thomin	no award	France	Roger Walkowiak	René Privat	Gianni Ferlenghi
3b	Jacques Anquetil	René Privat	Joseph Thomin	no award	France	Roger Walkowiak	René Privat	Gianni Ferlenghi
4	Marcel Janssens	René Privat	Stanislas Bober	no award	France	Marcel Janssens	René Privat	Fred De Bruyne
5	Gilbert Bauvin	Jacques Anquetil	Joseph Thomin	Daan de Groot	France	Jacques Anquetil	René Privat	Roger Walkowiak
6	André Trochut	Jacques Anquetil	Joseph Thomin	Daan de Groot	France	André Trochut	André Trochut	Robert Gibanel
7	Roger Hassenforder	Nicolas Barone	Joseph Thomin	Louis Bergaud	France	André Trochut	Nicolas Barone	Nino Defilippis
8	Pierino Baffi	Jean Forestier	Joseph Thomin	Louis Bergaud	France	André Trochut	Mario Bertolo	Marcel Rohrbach
9	Jacques Anquetil	Jean Forestier	Joseph Thomin	Louis Bergaud	France	Jacques Anquetil	Jacques Anquetil	Piet van Est
10	Gastone Nencini	Jacques Anquetil	Joseph Thomin	Gastone Nencini	France	Jacques Anquetil	Marcel Janssens	Piet de Jong
11	René Privat	Jacques Anquetil	Joseph Thomin	Gastone Nencini	France	Jacques Anquetil	Nello Lauredi	Arigo Padovan
12	Jean Stablinski	Jacques Anquetil	Joseph Thomin	Louis Bergaud	France	Jacques Anquetil	Henry Anglade	Marcel Huot
13	Nino Defilippis	Jacques Anquetil	Joseph Thomin	Louis Bergaud	France	Nicolas Barone	Nicolas Barone	Lothar Friedrich
14	Roger Hassenforder	Jacques Anquetil	Joseph Thomin	Louis Bergaud	France	Pierre Ruby	Nicolas Barone	Nello Lauredi
15a	René Privat	Jacques Anquetil	Joseph Thomin	Louis Bergaud	France	Bernardo Ruiz	Nicolas Barone	
15b	Jacques Anquetil	Jacques Anquetil	Joseph Thomin	Louis Bergaud	France	Bernardo Ruiz	Nicolas Barone	
16	Jean Bourlès	Jacques Anquetil	Wim van Est	Louis Bergaud	France	Marcel Queheille	Nicolas Barone	Joseph Thomin
17	Nino Defilippis	Jacques Anquetil	Jean Forestier	Louis Bergaud	France	Michel Stolker	Nicolas Barone	Gastone Nencini
18	Gastone Nencini	Jacques Anquetil	Jean Forestier	Gastone Nencini	France	José Manuel Ribeiro da Silva	Nicolas Barone	Mario Bertolo
19	Pierino Baffi	Jacques Anquetil	Jean Forestier	Gastone Nencini	France	Pierino Baffi	Nicolas Barone	Mario Baroni
20	Jacques Anquetil	Jacques Anquetil	Jean Forestier	Gastone Nencini	France	Jacques Anquetil	Jacques Anquetil	Georges Gay
21	André Darrigade	Jacques Anquetil	Jean Forestier	Gastone Nencini	France	Henry Anglade	Jacques Anquetil	Antonio Ferraz
22	André Darrigade	Jacques Anquetil	Jean Forestier	Gastone Nencini	France	Nicolas Barone	Nicolas Barone	Fernand Picot
Final		Jacques Anquetil	Jean Forestier	Gastone Nencini	France	Nicolas Barone		Fernand Picot

== Final standings ==
=== General classification ===
Final general classification (1–10)
Rank	Rider	Team	Time
1	Jacques Anquetil (FRA)	France	135h 44' 42"
2	Marcel Janssens (BEL)	Belgium	+ 14' 56"
3	Adolf Christian (AUT)	Switzerland	+ 17' 20"
4	Jean Forestier (FRA)	France	+ 18' 02"
5	Jesus Loroño (ESP)	Spain	+ 20' 17"
6	Gastone Nencini (ITA)	Italy	+ 26' 03"
7	Nino Defilippis (ITA)	Italy	+ 27' 57"
8	Wim Van Est (NED)	Netherlands	+ 28' 10"
9	Jan Adriaensens (BEL)	Belgium	+ 34' 07"
10	Jean Dotto (FRA)	South-East	+ 36' 31"

Final general classification (11–56)
Rank	Rider	Team	Time
11	François Mahé (FRA)	France	+ 39' 34"
12	Marcel Rohrbach (FRA)	North-East/Centre	+ 42' 58"
13	Fernand Picot (FRA)	West	+ 48' 26"
14	Gilbert Bauvin (FRA)	France	+ 54' 48"
15	Jean Bobet (FRA)	Île-de-France	+ 57' 48"
16	Joseph Planckaert (BEL)	Belgium	+ 58' 52"
17	Désiré Keteleer (BEL)	Belgium	+ 1h 00' 36"
18	Joseph Thomin (FRA)	West	+ 1h 14' 38"
19	Raymond Hoorelbeke (FRA)	Île-de-France	+ 1h 16' 18"
20	Arrigo Padovan (ITA)	Italy	+ 1h 23' 17"
21	Mario Tosato (ITA)	Italy	+ 1h 26' 50"
22	Georges Gay (FRA)	South-West	+ 1h 29' 11"
23	Pierino Baffi (ITA)	Italy	+ 1h 31' 12"
24	Bernardo Ruiz (ESP)	Spain	+ 1h 32' 55"
25	José Da Silva (POR)	Luxembourg/Mixed	+ 1h 33' 28"
26	Louis Bergaud (FRA)	France	+ 1h 36' 11"
27	André Darrigade (FRA)	France	+ 1h 40' 10"
28	Henry Anglade (FRA)	South-East	+ 1h 44' 15"
29	Gerrit Voorting (NED)	Netherlands	+ 1h 55' 09"
30	Marcel Queheille (FRA)	South-West	+ 1h 59' 13"
31	René Privat (FRA)	France	+ 2h 08' 24"
32	Piet Van Est (NED)	Netherlands	+ 2h 11' 24"
33	Piet De Jongh (NED)	Netherlands	+ 2h 14' 17"
34	André Le Dissez (FRA)	Île-de-France	+ 2h 15' 45"
35	Pino Cerami (BEL)	Belgium	+ 2h 15' 55"
36	Jean Bourles (FRA)	West	+ 2h 17' 59"
37	André Dupre (FRA)	South-West	+ 2h 18' 31"
38	Maurice Lampre (FRA)	South-West	+ 2h 19' 26"
39	Antonin Rolland (FRA)	North-East/Centre	+ 2h 19' 52"
40	Nicolas Barone (FRA)	Île-de-France	+ 2h 20' 33"
41	Pierre Ruby (FRA)	North-East/Centre	+ 2h 35' 43"
42	Joseph Groussard (FRA)	West	+ 2h 36' 58"
43	Jean Stablinski (FRA)	France	+ 2h 37' 17"
44	Mies Stolker (NED)	Netherlands	+ 2h 41' 18"
45	Jaap Kersten (NED)	Netherlands	+ 2h 43' 37"
46	Francis Pipelin (FRA)	West	+ 2h 43' 55"
47	Roger Chaussabel (FRA)	South-East	+ 2h 55' 09"
48	Pierre Poulingue (FRA)	West	+ 2h 59' 02"
49	Walter Holenweger (SUI)	Switzerland	+ 3h 00' 10"
50	Albert Bouvet (FRA)	France	+ 3h 02' 31"
51	Walter Favre (SUI)	Switzerland	+ 3h 11' 11"
52	Francis Siguenza (FRA)	South-East	+ 3h 18' 35"
53	Mario Baroni (ITA)	Italy	+ 3h 56' 20"
54	Carmelo Morales (ESP)	Spain	+ 3h 59' 08"
55	Tony Graeser (SUI)	Switzerland	+ 4h 18' 03"
56	Guy Million (FRA)	Île-de-France	+ 4h 41' 11"

=== Points classification ===
Final points classification (1–10
Rank	Rider	Team	Points
1	Jean Forestier (FRA)	France	301
2	Wim van Est (NED)	Netherlands	317
3	Adolf Christian (AUT)	Switzerland	366
4	Joseph Thomin (FRA)	West	402
5	Jacques Anquetil (FRA)	France	405
6	Fernand Picot (FRA)	West	418
7	Jef Planckaert (BEL)	Belgium	445
8	Désiré Keteleer (BEL)	Belgium	460
9	Gastone Nencini (ITA)	Italy	533
10	Gilbert Bauvin (FRA)	France	573

=== Mountains classification ===
Final mountains classification (1–10)
Rank	Rider	Team	Points
1	Gastone Nencini (ITA)	Italy	44
2	Louis Bergaud (FRA)	France	43
3	Marcel Janssens (BEL)	Belgium	32
4	Jacques Anquetil (FRA)	France	24
4	Jesus Loroño (ESP)	Spain	24
6	Jan Adriaensens (BEL)	Belgium	20
7	Henri Anglade (FRA)	South-East	18
8	Marcel Queheille (FRA)	South-West	17
8	Jean Dotto (FRA)	South-East	17
10	Jean Stablinski (FRA)	France	16
10	Marcel Rohrbach (FRA)	North-East/Centre	16

=== Team classification ===
Final team classification
Rank	Team	Time
1	France	405h 59' 08"
2	Italy	+ 1h 24' 36"
3	Belgium	+ 2h 24' 36"
4	Netherlands	+ 3h 43' 43"
5	West	+ 3h 51' 49"
6	North-East/Centre	+ 4h 38' 43"
7	Île-de-France	+ 4h 44' 40"
8	South-East	+ 4h 57' 50"
9	South-West	+ 5h 11' 25"
10	Switzerland	+ 5h 28' 32"
11	Spain	+ 5h 59' 00"

=== Combativity classification ===
Final combativity classification (1–10)
Rank	Rider	Team	Points
1	Nicolas Barone (FRA)	Île-de-France	218
2	Jacques Anquetil (FRA)	France	161
3	Marcel Janssens (BEL)	Belgium	126
4	Pierre Ruby (FRA)	North-East/Centre	112
5	Gastone Nencini (ITA)	Italy	111
6	Henry Anglade (FRA)	South-East	106
7	Jean Stablinski (FRA)	France	91
8	Marcel Queheille (FRA)	South-West	80
9	René Privat (FRA)	France	77
10	Michel Stolker (NED)	Netherlands	70

== Aftermath ==
Jacques Anquetil would later win the Tour de France four more times.

From 1960 to 1967, the "Alex Virot award" was given to the most loyal cyclist, named after the journalist who died during the 1957 Tour de France.

== Bibliography ==
- Amels, Wim (1984). De geschiedenis van de Tour de France 1903–1984 (in Dutch). Valkenswaard, Netherlands: Sport-Express. ISBN 978-90-70763-05-3.
- Augendre, Jacques (2016). Guide historique [Historical guide] (PDF) (in French). Paris: Amaury Sport Organisation. Archived (PDF) from the original on 17 August 2016.
- Dauncey, Hugh; Hare, Geoff (2003). The Tour de France, 1903–2003: A Century of Sporting Structures, Meanings and Values. London: Frank Cass & Co. ISBN 978-0-203-50241-9.
- McGann, Bill; McGann, Carol (2006). The Story of the Tour de France: 1903–1964. Vol. 1. Indianapolis, IN: Dog Ear Publishing. ISBN 978-1-59858-180-5.
- Nauright, John; Parrish, Charles (2012). Sports Around the World: History, Culture, and Practice. Vol. 2. Santa Barbara, CA: ABC-CLIO. ISBN 978-1-59884-300-2.
- Seray, Jacques [in French]; Lablaine, Jacques (2006). Henri Desgrange, l'homme qui créa le Tour de France [Henri Desgrange, the man who created the Tour de France] (in French). Saint-Malo, France: Editions Cristel. ISBN 978-2-84421-042-5.
- Thompson, Christopher S. (2006). The Tour de France: A Cultural History. University of California Press. ISBN 0-520-24760-4.
- van den Akker, Pieter (2018). Tour de France Rules and Statistics: 1903–2018. Self-published. ISBN 978-1-79398-080-9.
