= 1957 UCI Road World Championships – Men's road race =

Men's Individual Road Race
1957 UCI Road World Championships
- Rainbow jersey

Race details
- Dates: August 18, 1957
- Stages: 1
- Distance: 285.6 km (177.5 mi)
- Winning time: 7h 43' 10"

Medalists
	Gold	Rik Van Steenbergen (BEL)	(Belgium)
	Silver	Louison Bobet (FRA)	(France)
	Bronze	André Darrigade (FRA)	(France)

The men's road race at the 1957 UCI Road World Championships took place in Waregem. The course comprised 12 laps around 23.8-kilometre route, making a total distance of 285.6 km.

== The race ==
In the penultimate lap Wout Wagtmans attacked. He had a gap of 1 minute at it maximum. Then Marcel Janssens reacted, together with Rik Van Looy they closed the gap. Van Looy and Janssens left Wagtmans behind. In the final lap the duo had a gap of 30 secondes. At that time, it looked like Rik II (Rik Van Looy) would become the new World Champion, but Janssens got cramps.

In the peloton Louison Bobet and Jacques Anquetil were leading the chase. Before Anzegem they could catch the two leaders. Subsequent Fred De Bruyne attacked. Rik Van Steenbergen didn't react, but Bobet did. There was a new leading group: the Frenchman Bobet and the Belgian De Bruyne. Because Bobet was a faster sprinter and would likely win from De Bruyne, there was a reaction of Van Steenbergen. Together with Van Looy, Jacques Anquetil and André Darrigade he could close the gap. A group of six rides could sprint for the victory.

At 400m of the finish Darrigade started the sprint. At 150m Rik Van Steenbergen came nearby and he won the sprint with six. Rik I won for the third time the World Championship. For the first time he succeeded in his own country.

== Final classification ==
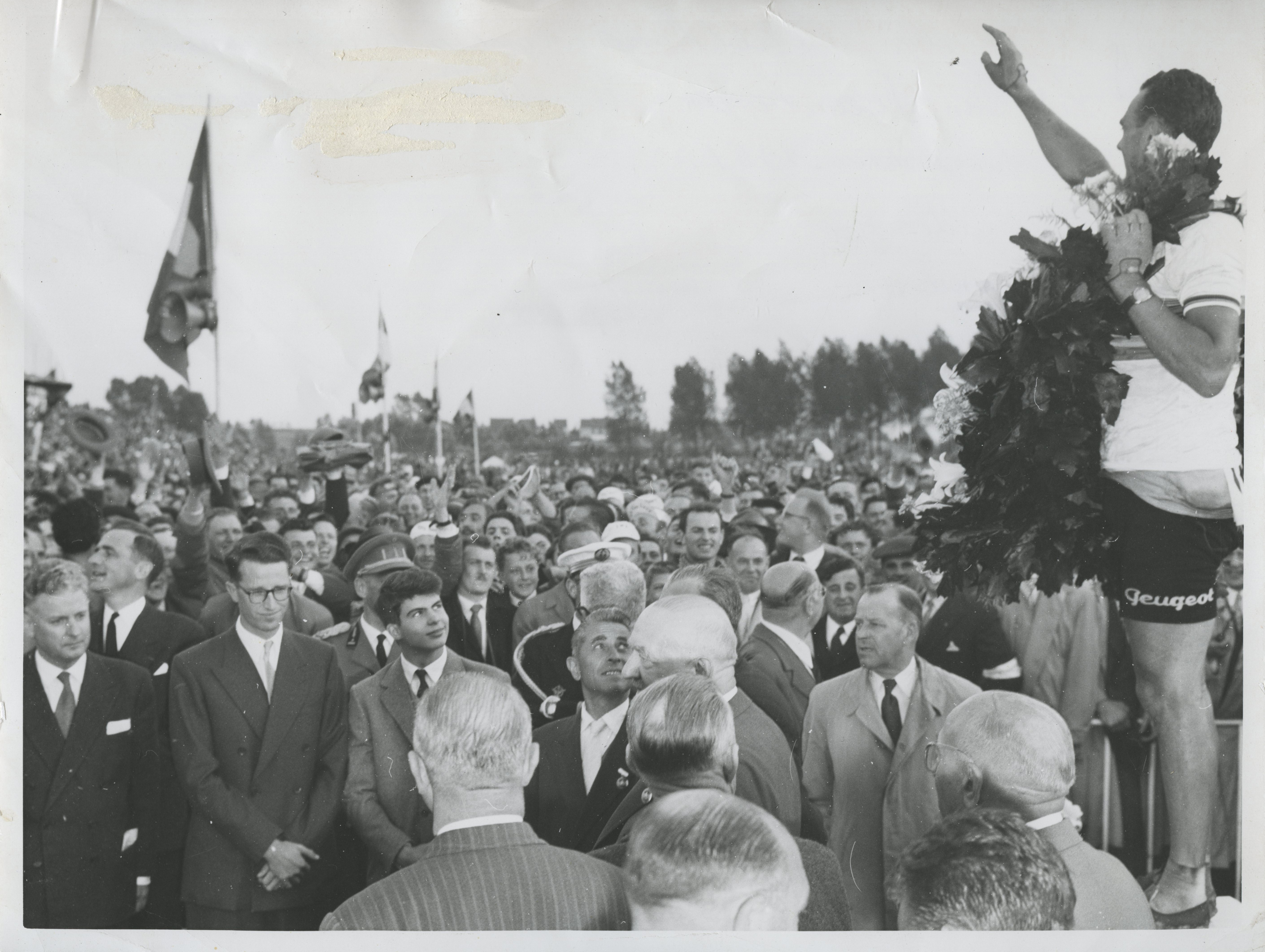
Rik Van Steenbergen salutes the public, with king Baudouin in the front

Rank	Rider	Time
1st place, gold medalist(s)	Rik Van Steenbergen (BEL)	07h 43' 10"
2nd place, silver medalist(s)	Louison Bobet (FRA)	s.t.
3rd place, bronze medalist(s)	André Darrigade (FRA)	s.t.
4.	Rik Van Looy (BEL)	s.t.
5.	Alfred De Bruyne (BEL)	s.t.
6.	Jacques Anquetil (FRA)	s.t.
7.	Leon Van Daele (BEL)	+12"
8.	Germain Derijcke (BEL)	s.t.
9.	Julien Schepens (BEL)	s.t.
10.	Marcel Ernzer (LUX)	s.t.

== Riders ==
Belgium: Marcel Janssens, Germain Derycke, Raymond Impanis, Julien Schepens, Leon Van Daele, Fred De Bruyne, Rik Van Looy, Rik Van Steenbergen.

France: Louison Bobet, Jacques Anquetil, André Darrigade, Bernard Gauthier, Valentin Huot, Jean Forestier, Jacques Dupont, Marcel Rohrbach.

Italy: Gastone Nencini, Ercole Baldini, Guido Boni, Nino Defilippis, Arrigo Padovan, Pierino Baffi, Aldo Moser, Alfredo Sabbadin.

Netherlands: Wim van Est, Wout Wagtmans, Léo van der Pluym, Piet de Jong, Frantz Mahn, Piet van Est, Piet Maas, Daan De Groot

Germany: Horst Backat, Klaus Bugdahl, Mathias Löder, Lothar Friedrich, Hans Junkermann, Heinz Müller, Emil Reinecke, Franz Reitz

Great Britain: Brian Robinson, Dave Bedwell, Ron Coe, Bermard Pusey, David Ricketts, Ian Brown, Robert Maitland, Brian Haskell

Switzerland: Max Schellenberg, Walter Favre, Walter Holenweger, Toni Gräser, Attilio Moresi, Ernst Traxel, Ramon Annen

Denmark: Hans-Edmund Andresen, Fritz Ravn, Jorgen-Franck Rasmussen, Keld Leveau

Spain: Salvador Botella, Miguel Bover, Antonio Ferraz, Jesus Galdeano

Luxemburg: Jean-Pierre Schmitz, Willy Kemp, Marcel Ernzer, Charly Gaul

Australia: Maurice Horder

Austria: Adolf Christian

Liechtenstein: Alois Lampaert
