= Virot =

Virot is a French surname. It may refer to:

- Andree Virot (1905 - 2010), French spy and Resistance member
- Alex Virot (1890 - 1957), French sports journalist
- Charles François de Virot de Sombreuil (1725 - 1794), French general
- Robert Virot (1915 - 2002), French botanist
