= 1960 Milan–San Remo =

Race details
- Dates: 19 March 1960
- Stages: 1
- Distance: 288 km (179 mi)
- Winning time: 6h 45' 15"

Results
	Winner	René Privat (FRA)	(Mercier–BP–Hutchinson)
	Second	Jean Graczyk (FRA)	(Helyett–Leroux–Fynsec–Hutchinson)
	Third	Yvo Molenaers (BEL)	(Carpano)

The 1960 Milan–San Remo was the 51st edition of the Milan–San Remo cycle race and was held on 19 March 1960. The race started in Milan and finished in San Remo. The race was won by René Privat of the Mercier team.

== General classification ==
Final general classification

Rank	Rider	Team	Time
1	René Privat (FRA)	Mercier–BP–Hutchinson	6h 45' 15"
2	Jean Graczyk (FRA)	Helyett–Leroux–Fynsec–Hutchinson	+ 11"
3	Yvo Molenaers (BEL)	Carpano	+ 20"
4	Arthur Decabooter (BEL)	Groene Leeuw–Sinalco–SAS	+ 1' 40"
5	Pierre Ruby (FRA)	Peugeot–BP–Dunlop	+ 1' 40"
6	Rik Van Looy (BEL)	Faema	+ 1' 40"
7	Frans De Mulder (BEL)	Groene Leeuw–Sinalco–SAS	+ 1' 40"
8	Jo de Roo (NED)	Helyett–Leroux–Fynsec–Hutchinson	+ 1' 40"
9	René Fournier (FRA)	Saint-Raphaël–R. Geminiani–Dunlop	+ 1' 40"
10	Frans Schoubben (BEL)	Peugeot–BP–Dunlop	+ 1' 40"
