= René Faure =

French cyclist

Personal information
- Born: 14 January 1928 Romans Sur Isere
- Died: 9 September 2005 (aged 77)

Cycling career
- Sport: Cycling
- Role: Rider

René Faure (14 January 1928 – 9 September 2005) was a French racing cyclist. He rode in the 1957 Tour de France.
