= Raymond Plaza =

French cyclist (born 1932)

Personal information
- Born: 3 April 1932 (age 94) Colombes, France

Cycling career
- Sport: Cycling
- Role: Rider

Raymond Plaza (born 3 April 1932) is a French racing cyclist. He rode in the 1957 Tour de France.
