= Marcel Carfantan =

French cyclist (1933–2026)

Personal information
- Born: 21 February 1933 Pleurtuit, France
- Died: 11 September 2026 (aged 93) Langrolay-sur-Rance, France

Cycling career
- Sport: Cycling
- Role: Rider

Marcel Carfantan (21 February 1933 – 11 September 2026) was a French racing cyclist. He rode in the 1957 Tour de France.

Carfantan died on 11 September 2026, at the age of 93.
