= Arie van Wetten =

Dutch cyclist

Personal information
- Born: 26 September 1934
- Died: 1 October 2013 (aged 79)

Cycling career
- Sport: Cycling
- Role: Rider

Arie van Wetten (26 September 1934 – 1 October 2013) was a Dutch racing cyclist. He rode in the 1957 Tour de France.
