= Guy Million =

French cyclist (1932–2004)

Personal information
- Full name: Guy Million
- Born: 22 May 1932 Colombes, France
- Died: 4 May 2004 (aged 71) Châlon-sur-Saône, France

Cycling career
- Sport: Cycling
- Role: Rider

Guy Million (22 May 1932 – 4 May 2004) was a French racing cyclist. He finished in last place in the 1957 Tour de France.
