= Alex Virot =

French journalist and painter

Personal information
- Nationality: French
- Born: Alexandre Virot; 1890
- Died: 14 July 1957 (aged 66–67) Ax-les-Thermes, Ariège, France
- Occupation: Sports journalist
Medal record
Representing France
Painting
Olympic Games
Silver medal – second place	1928 Amsterdam	Painting

Alexandre Virot (1890 – 14 July 1957) was a French sports journalist, who was active from the 1920s until his death in 1957. He won a silver medal in painting at the 1928 Summer Olympics. Virot died in a motorcycle accident whilst covering the 1957 Tour de France, making him the only journalist to have been killed whilst covering the Tour.

== Career ==
In his youth, Virot was interested in sports and art courses, with a particular interest in Antoine Bourdelle. Virot fought in the First World War in the trenches and as a trained pilot, and also fought for the French Resistance during the Second World War. Virot drew for the Miroir des Sports, and was asked by the newspaper to cover the 1928 Summer Olympics in Amsterdam. Whilst there, he was awarded the silver medal in the painting event. In the 1920s, Virot also wrote for L'Intransigeant.

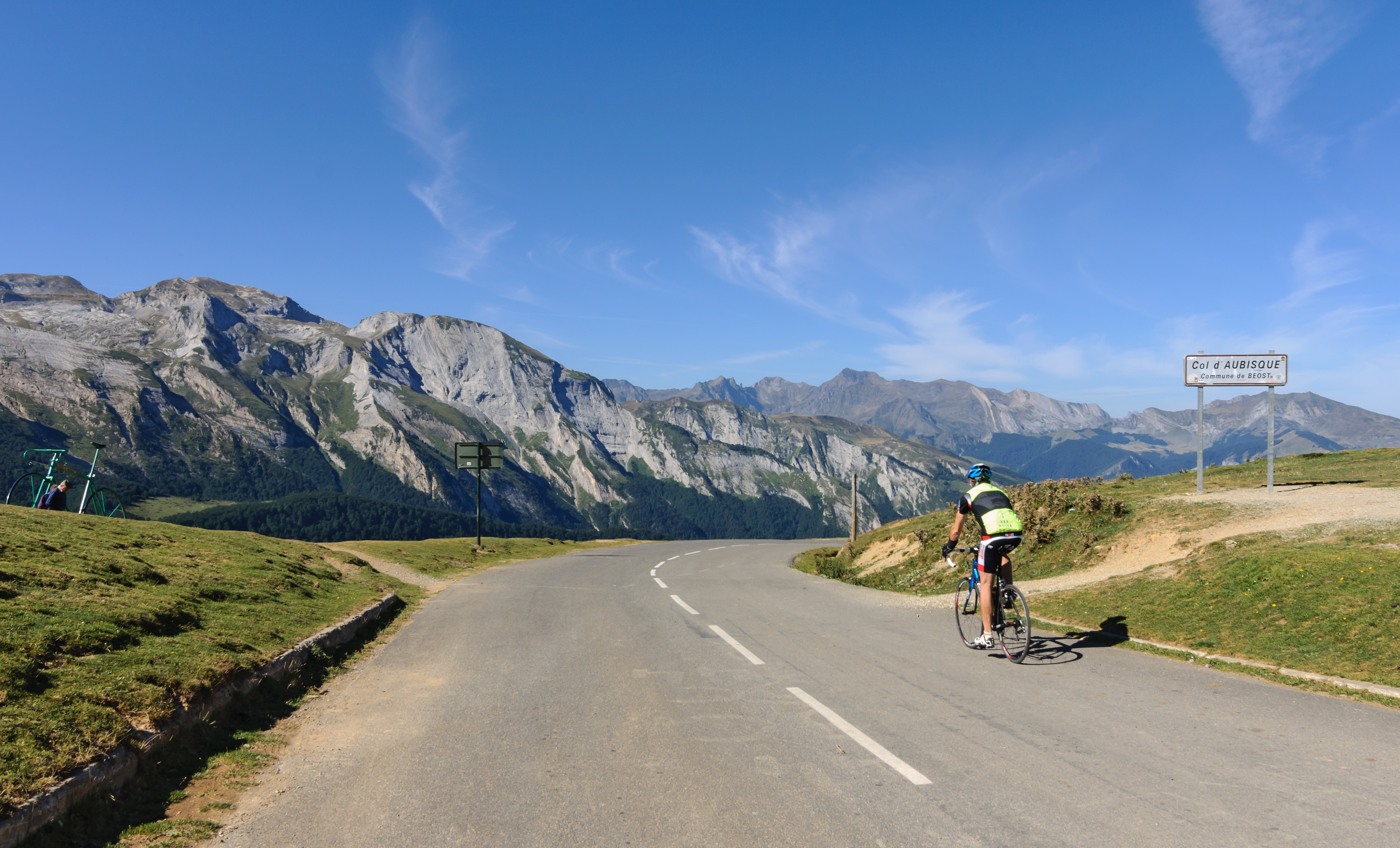
Col d'Aubisque, where Virot recorded the first radio broadcast of a Tour de France summit finish in 1932.

As a journalist, Virot reported on 22 editions of the Tour de France. In 1929, he broadcast the first radio report of the Tour. In 1932, Virot broadcast a summit finish at the Col d'Aubisque, the first live radio broadcast from a summit finish. Virot also covered football, boxing, motorsports and skiing, as well as the first French national lottery draw in 1934. He covered the 1932 International Lawn Tennis Challenge. During the 1930s, Virot also worked as a war reporter. During the Second Italo-Ethiopian War, Virot interviewed Ethiopian King Haile Selassie. In 1938, he left his coverage of the FIS Alpine World Ski Championships 1938 to travel to Austria to provide a live report of the German annexation of Austria, in defiance of Nazi censorship of the event.

After the Second World War, he worked for Radiodiffusion-Télévision Française and Radio Luxembourg.

== Death and legacy ==
Virot died in a motorcycle accident whilst covering the 1957 Tour de France, making him the only journalist to have been killed whilst covering the Tour. Virot was covering the Bastille Day stage from Barcelona, Spain, to Ax-les-Thermes, which was stage 16 of the race. Riding on a motorcycle with his driver, René Wagner, Virot had been providing a time check to cyclist Marcel Queheille; Virot and Wagner were both working for Radio Luxembourg. Travelling at about 30 kilometres per hour (19 mph), the motorcycle veered off the track and crashed in a ravine. Virot fractured his skull and died on his way to hospital. Wagner was alive when he arrived at the hospital, but later also died.

Before stage 17 started in Ax-les-Thermes, a minute's silence was held in memory of Virot and Wagner.

From 1960 to 1967, the Tour de France awarded the Alex Virot award for the most loyal cyclist.
