= André Trochut =

French cyclist

Personal information
- Full name: André Trochut
- Born: November 6, 1931 Chermignac, France
- Died: August 4, 1996 (aged 64) Geay, France

Cycling career
- Sport: Cycling
- Discipline: Road
- Role: Rider

Major wins
- 1 stage Tour de France

André Trochut (Chermignac, 6 November 1931 — Geay, 4 August 1996) was a French professional road bicycle racer. In the 1957 Tour de France, Trochut won the 6th stage.

== Major results ==
1957
Tour de France:

Winner stage 6

1958
Gourin
Le Guâ
1959
Lagnon
Castillon-la-Bataille
