= Alcide Vaucher =

Swiss cyclist (1934–2022)

Personal information
- Born: 19 April 1934
- Died: 3 June 2022 (aged 88)

Cycling career
- Sport: Cycling
- Role: Rider

Alcide Vaucher (19 April 1934 – 3 June 2022) was a Swiss racing cyclist. He rode in the 1957 Tour de France. Vaucher died on 3 June 2022, at the age of 88.
