= Jacques Bianco =

French cyclist

Personal information
- Born: 27 June 1928
- Died: 20 February 2011 (aged 82)

Cycling career
- Sport: Cycling
- Role: Rider

Jacques Bianco (27 June 1928 – 20 February 2011) was a French racing cyclist. He rode in the 1957 Tour de France.
