= Chermignac =

- Commune
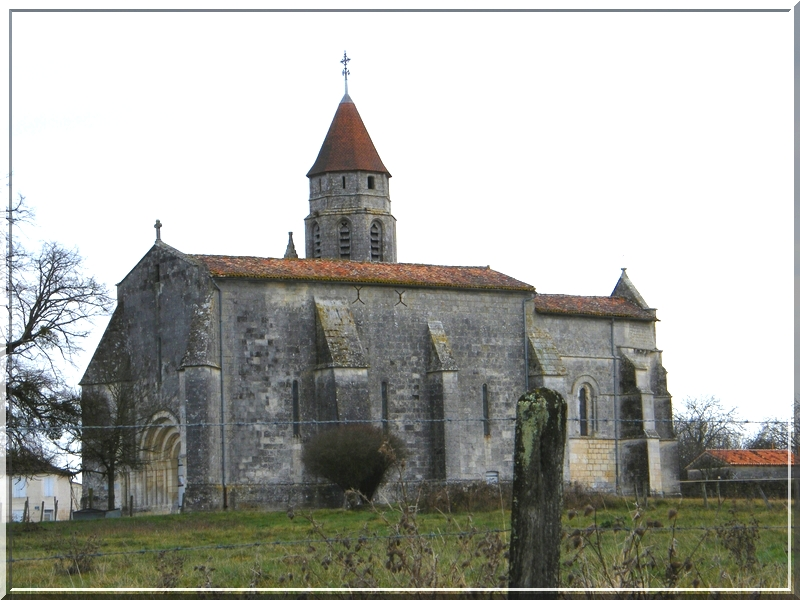
- The church in Chermignac

- Coat of arms
- Location of Chermignac
- Location within France Location within Nouvelle-Aquitaine
- Coordinates: 45°41′03″N 0°40′14″W
- Country: France
- Region: Nouvelle-Aquitaine
- Department: Charente-Maritime
- Arrondissement: Saintes
- Canton: Thénac
- Intercommunality: CA Saintes

Government
  - Mayor (2020–2026): Jean-Michel Rouger
- Area^{1}: 13.43 km^{2} (5.19 sq mi)
- Highest elevation: 68 m (223 ft)
- Lowest elevation: 25 m (82 ft)
- Population (2023): 1,265
  - Density: 94.19/km^{2} (244.0/sq mi)
- Time zone: UTC+01:00 (CET)
  - Summer (DST): UTC+02:00 (CEST)
- INSEE/Postal code: 17102 /17460
- ^{1} French Land Register data, which excludes lakes, ponds, glaciers > 1 km^{2} (0.386 sq mi or 247 acres) and river estuaries.

Chermignac (French pronunciation: [ʃɛʁmiɲak]) is a commune in the Charente-Maritime department in southwestern France.

== Population ==
Historical population
Year	Pop.	±% p.a.
1968	556	—
1975	587	+0.78%
1982	862	+5.64%
1990	968	+1.46%
1999	1,015	+0.53%
2007	1,163	+1.72%
2012	1,276	+1.87%
2017	1,247	−0.46%
2023	1,265	+0.24%
Source: INSEE

== See also ==
- Communes of the Charente-Maritime department
