= Toni Gräser =

Swiss cyclist (1933–2022)

Personal information
- Born: 10 September 1933
- Died: 24 April 2022 (aged 88)

Cycling career
- Sport: Cycling
- Role: Rider

Toni Gräser (10 September 1933 – 24 April 2022) was a Swiss racing cyclist. He rode in the 1957 Tour de France. Gräser died on 24 April 2022, at the age of 88.
