= Robert Gibanel =

French cyclist (1932–2021)

Personal information
- Born: 6 July 1932 Jurançon, France
- Died: 28 September 2021 (aged 89)

Cycling career
- Sport: Cycling
- Role: Rider

Robert Gibanel (6 July 1932 – 28 September 2021) was a French professional racing cyclist. He rode in two editions of the Tour de France.
