= Roger Chaussabel =

French cyclist (1932–2023)

Personal information
- Full name: Roger Chaussabel
- Born: 18 February 1932 Marseille, France
- Died: November 2023 (aged 91)

Cycling career
- Sport: Cycling
- Role: Rider

Roger Chaussabel (18 February 1932 – November 2023) was a French racing cyclist. He finished in last place in the 1956 Tour de France.

Chaussabel died in November 2023, at the age of 91.
