= José Manuel Ribeiro da Silva =

Portuguese cyclist

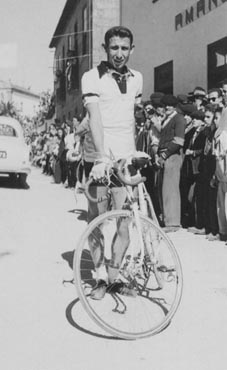
- Ribeiro da Silva during a vault in Portugal

Personal information
- Born: 16 February 1935 Paredes, Portugal
- Died: 9 April 1958 (aged 23)

Cycling career
- Sport: Cycling
- Discipline: Road
- Role: Rider

Professional teams
- 1955–1958: Académico
- 1957: Rochet–Dunlop
- 1958: Helyett–Leroux–Hutchinson

Major wins
- Volta a Portugal (1955, 1957)

José Manuel Ribeiro da Silva (16 February 1935 – 9 April 1958) was a Portuguese racing cyclist. He rode in the 1957 Tour de France. He also won the Volta a Portugal in 1955 and 1957.

== Major results ==
1954
2nd Road race, National Road Championships
5th Overall Vuelta a Pontevedra
1955
1st Overall Volta a Portugal

1st Stages 1a, 1b & 12b

1956
2nd Overall Volta a Portugal

1st Stage 8

1957
1st Overall Volta a Portugal

1st Stages 4 & 9

1st Paris-Évreux
4th Overall Vuelta a España
