= René Privat =

French cyclist

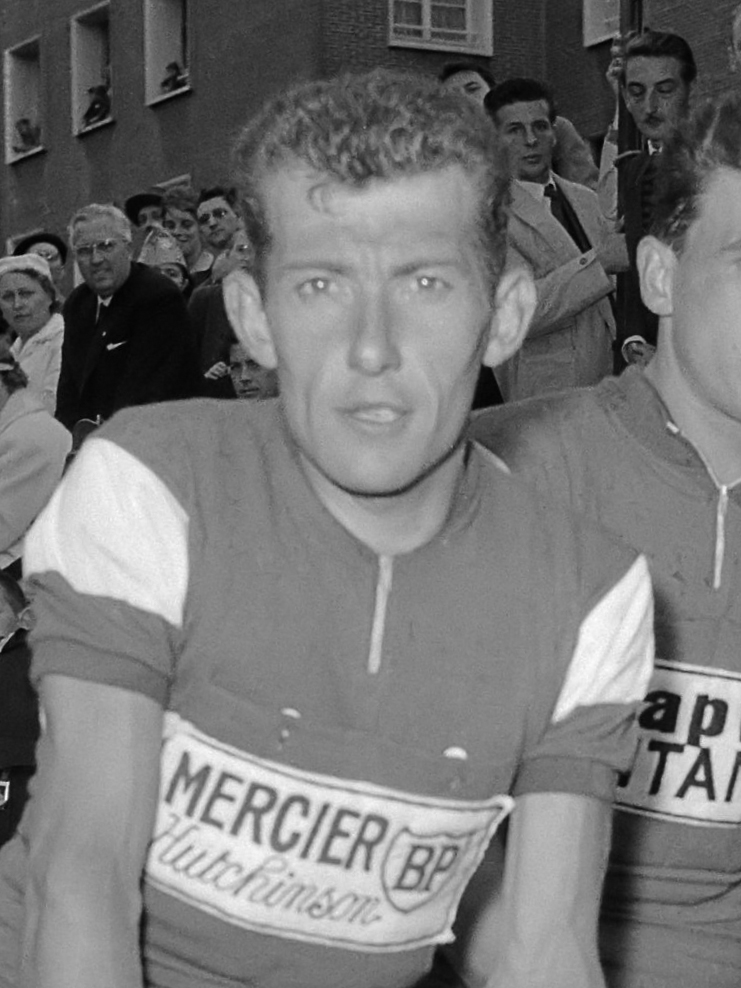

Personal information
- Full name: René Privat
- Born: 4 December 1930 Coux, Ardèche, France
- Died: 19 July 1995 (aged 64) Le Puy-en-Velay, France

Cycling career
- Sport: Cycling
- Discipline: Road
- Role: Rider

Major wins
- Milan–San Remo (1960)

René Privat (4 December 1930 – 19 July 1995) was a French professional road bicycle racer. He was professional from 1952 to 1962 with 19 wins which included the classic Milan–San Remo. He also won three stages in the 1957 Tour de France and one stage in the 1960 Tour de France.

== Major results ==
1953
Circuit de Drome - Ardèche
1954
Genoa–Nice
Critérium International
1956
Brest
Circuit de l'Ain
Circuit des Boucles de la Seine
GP du Pneumatique
Tour de France:

9th place overall classification

GP Vals-les-Bains
La Grande Combe
1957
Paris-Limoges
Tour de France:

Winner stages 2, 11 and 15A
Wearing yellow jersey for three days

1958
Salignac
Tour du Var
1959
Tour du Sud-Est
Grand Prix Stan Ockers
Montélimar
1960
Auxerre
Ronde de Seignelay
Milan–San Remo
Tour de France:

Winner stage 2
