= Stanislas Bober =

French cyclist

Personal information
- Full name: Stanislas Bober
- Born: 12 March 1930 Nanterre, France
- Died: 8 July 1975 (aged 45) Paris, France

Cycling career
- Sport: Cycling
- Discipline: Road
- Role: Rider

Major wins
- 1 stage Tour de France

Stanislas Bober (Nanterre, 12 March 1930 — Paris, 8 July 1975) was a French professional road bicycle racer. Bober won a stage in the 1953 Tour de France.

== Major results ==
1952
Paris–Bourges
1953
Circuit de l'Indre
Tour de France:

Winner stage 3

1955
Lézignan
