= Walter Holenweger =

Swiss cyclist (1933-2004)

Personal information
- Born: 15 May 1933
- Died: 7 July 2004 (aged 71)

Cycling career
- Sport: Cycling
- Role: Rider

Walter Holenweger (15 May 1933 – 7 July 2004) was a Swiss racing cyclist. He rode in the 1957 Tour de France.
