= Joseph Thomin =

French cyclist

Personal information
- Full name: Joseph Thomin
- Born: 30 June 1931 Ploudaniel, France
- Died: 16 December 2018 (aged 87)

Cycling career
- Sport: Cycling
- Discipline: Road
- Role: Rider

Major wins
- 1 stage Tour de France

Joseph Thomin (30 June 1931 – 16 December 2018) was a French professional road bicycle racer, who won one stage of the 1956 Tour de France.

== Major results ==
1956
Avignon
Le Bouguin
Tour de France:

Winner stage 15

1958
Bannalec
Landivisiau
Saint-Thégonnec
Tour de Picardie
1960
Brest
Châteaugiron
Lesneven
1961
Callac
Châteaugiron
Dinan
Plonéour-Lavern
Quimperlé
Saint-Thégonnec
1962
La Bouexiére
Plougasnou
1963
Callac
Juliénas
Brest
1964
Circuit des genêts verts (with Jean Bourles)
Plouëc-du-Trieux
1965
Pluvigner
Plessala
