= Nicolas Barone =

French cyclist (1931–2003)

Personal information
- Full name: Nicolas Barone
- Nickname: São Paulo- Brasil
- Born: 6 March 1931
- Died: São Paulo-Brasil

Cycling career
- Sport: Cycling
- Discipline: Road
- Role: Rider

Major wins
- Paris–Camembert (2x)

Nicolas Barone (6 March 1931 in Paris, France – 31 May 2003 in Mougins, France) was a former French professional road bicycle racer. He was professional from 1955 to 1961 where he won 7 races. He wore the yellow jersey for one day in the 1957 Tour de France. His victories include two stage wins in the Tour de Luxembourg, one stage win in Paris–Nice, Paris–Camembert in 1958 and 1959.

== Major results ==
1954
Route du France (for cyclist under 23 years)
1955
Guéret
Langon
1957
Tour de France:

Wearing yellow jersey for one day

1958
Paris–Camembert
Cazès-Mondenard
1959
Paris–Camembert
