= André Dupré =

French cyclist (1929–2024)

Personal information
- Born: 7 May 1931 Ligueux, France
- Died: 29 May 2024 (aged 93) Saint-Médard-en-Jalles, France

Cycling career
- Sport: Cycling
- Role: Rider

André Dupré (7 May 1931 – 29 May 2024) was a French racing cyclist. He rode in the 1955 Tour de France. Dupré died on 29 May 2024, at the age of 93.
