= Gianni Ferlenghi =

Italian cyclist (1931–2023)

Personal information
- Born: 11 February 1931 Collesalvetti, Italy
- Died: 19 August 2023 (aged 92) Sospiro, Italy

Cycling career
- Sport: Cycling
- Role: Rider

Gianni Ferlenghi (11 February 1931 – 19 August 2023) was an Italian professional racing cyclist. He rode in three editions of the Tour de France.

Born in Collesalvetti, Ferlenghi started his career as a junior with the Pedale Soresinese team, and was a professional rider from 1954 to 1961. Best known as a domestique of Fausto Coppi, during his career his best results were a victory in a stage of the Tour d'Europe and two runner-up placements in stages of the Giro d'Italia and of the Paris–Nice. Ferlenghi died in Sospiro on 19 August 2023, at the age of 92.
