= Mario Tosato =

Italian cyclist

Personal information
- Born: 11 December 1930
- Died: 16 January 1996 (aged 65)

Cycling career
- Sport: Cycling
- Role: Rider

Mario Tosato (11 December 1930 – 16 January 1996) was an Italian racing cyclist. He rode in the 1957 Tour de France.
