= Pierre Poulingue =

French cyclist (1933–2017)

Personal information
- Born: 12 May 1933 Vatteville-la-Rue, France
- Died: 21 July 2017 (aged 84) Bois-Guillaume, France

Cycling career
- Sport: Cycling
- Role: Rider

Pierre Poulingue (12 May 1933 – 21 July 2017) was a French racing cyclist. He rode in the 1957 Tour de France. Poulingue died in Bois-Guillaume on 21 July 2017, at the age of 84.
