= Piet De Jongh =

Dutch cyclist

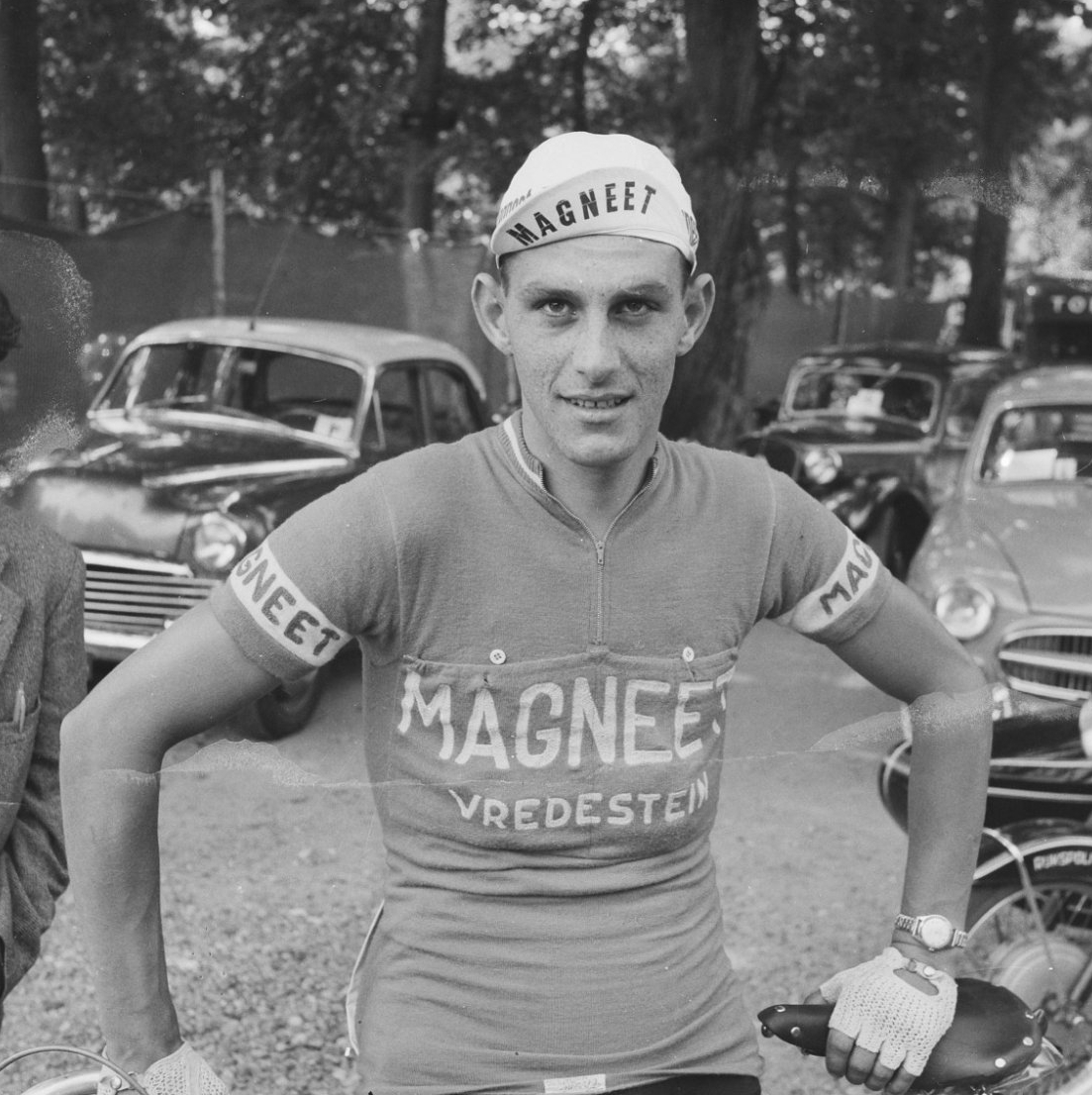

Personal information
- Born: 15 November 1934 (age 91)

Cycling career
- Sport: Cycling
- Role: Rider

Piet De Jongh (born 15 November 1934) is a Dutch racing cyclist. He rode in the 1957 Tour de France.
