= Francis Siguenza =

French cyclist (1930–2021)

Personal information
- Born: 30 November 1930 Nîmes, France
- Died: 11 April 2021 (aged 90) Vienne, France

Cycling career
- Sport: Cycling
- Role: Rider

Francis Siguenza (30 November 1930 – 11 April 2021) was a French professional racing cyclist. He rode in four editions of the Tour de France. Siguenza died in Vienne on 11 April 2021, at the age of 90.
