= Raymond Hoorelbeke =

French cyclist (1930–2022)

Personal information
- Born: 3 January 1930 Auxi-le-Château, France
- Died: 15 April 2022 (aged 92) Auxi-le-Château, France

Cycling career
- Sport: Cycling
- Role: Rider

Raymond Hoorelbeke (3 January 1930 – 15 April 2022) was a French professional racing cyclist. He rode in eight editions of the Tour de France. Hoorelbeke died in Auxi-le-Château on 15 April 2022, at the age of 92.
