= Pierino Baffi =

Italian cyclist

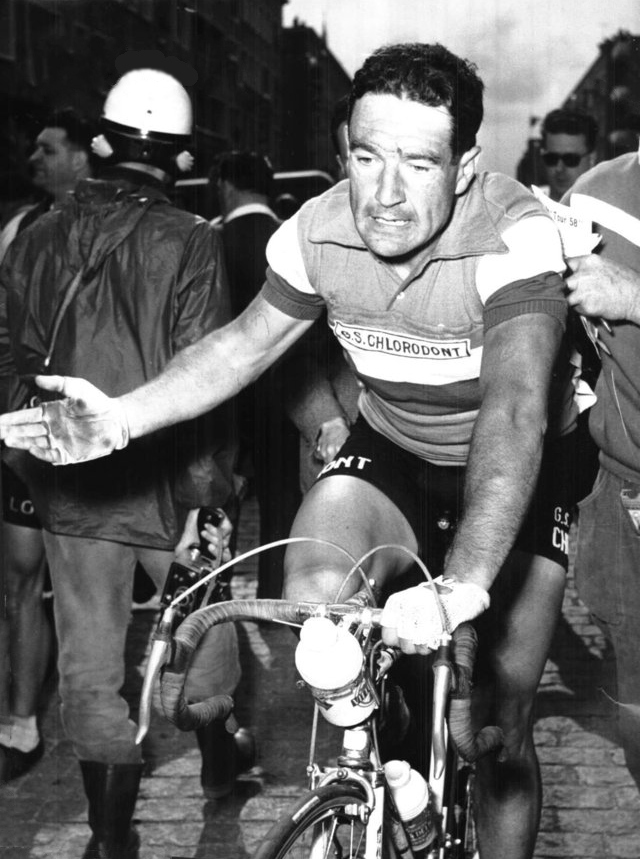
- Baffi in 1958

Personal information
- Full name: Pierino Baffi
- Born: 15 September 1930 Vailate, Italy
- Died: 27 March 1985 (aged 54)

Cycling career
- Sport: Cycling
- Discipline: Road
- Role: Rider
- Rider type: Sprinter

Professional teams
- 1954–1956: Nivea-Fuchs
- 1957: Arbos-Bif Welter
- 1958: Chlorodont-Leo
- 1959: Ignis-Frejus
- 1960: Ignis
- 1961: Fides
- 1962: Ghigi
- 1963–1964: Molteni
- 1965: Bianchi-Mobylette
- 1966: G.B.C.

Major wins
- Giro d'Italia, 4 stages Tour de France, 5 stages Vuelta a España, 4 stages

Pierino Baffi (15 September 1930 – 27 March 1985) was an Italian professional road bicycle racer. In 1958 he won stages in all three of the Grand Tours, becoming the second cyclist (after Miguel Poblet) to win stages in all three of the Grand Tours in the same year. As of 2016, this has only been repeated by Alessandro Petacchi in 2003. Baffi's son Adriano also became a professional cyclist.

== Major results ==
1955
1st, Stages 6 & 9, Vuelta a España
1956
1st, Giro di Romagna
1st, Milano–Vignola
1st, Stage 10, Giro d'Italia
1957
1st, Stages 8 & 19, Tour de France
1958
1st, Stage 12, Giro d'Italia
1st, Stages 10, 16 & 24, Tour de France
1st, Stages 3 & 14, Vuelta a España
1959
1st, Milano-Mantua
1st, Stage 9, Paris–Nice
1st, Stage 7b, Roma-Naples-Roma
1960
1st, Giro dell'Emilia
1st, Trofeo Fenaroli
1st, Stage 6, Giro d'Italia
1st, Stage 4a, Roma-Naples-Roma
1962
1st, Coppa Bernocchi
1st, Milano-Mantua
1st, Trofeo Matteotti
1963
1st, Trofeo Matteotti
1st, Stage 2, Giro d'Italia
1st, Stage 1 & 4, Tour de Luxembourg
