= Max Schellenberg =

Swiss cyclist

Personal information
- Born: 6 October 1927 Hittnau, Switzerland
- Died: 26 May 2000 (aged 72) Hittnau, Switzerland

Cycling career
- Sport: Cycling
- Role: Rider

Max Schellenberg (6 October 1927 – 26 May 2000) was a Swiss professional racing cyclist. He rode in five editions of the Tour de France.
