= Maurice Lampre =

French cyclist

Personal information
- Born: 29 June 1930
- Died: 21 May 2001 (aged 70) Onet-le-Château, France

Cycling career
- Sport: Cycling
- Role: Rider

Maurice Lampre (29 June 1930 – 21 May 2001) was a French professional racing cyclist. He rode in three editions of the Tour de France, and once in each of the Giro d'Italia and the Vuelta a España, from 1955 to 1959.
