= Mario Bertolo =

French cyclist

Personal information
- Born: 28 January 1929 San Vito al Tagliamento, Italy
- Died: 20 September 2009 (aged 80) Digoin, France

Cycling career
- Sport: Cycling
- Role: Rider

Mario Bertolo (28 January 1929 – 20 September 2009) was a French professional racing cyclist. He rode in three editions of the Tour de France. Italian by birth, he was naturalized on 15 November 1958.
