= Marcel Janssens =

Belgian cyclist (1931-1992)

- Janssens with Solo–Terrot–Van Steenbergen in 1963

Personal information
- Full name: Marcel Janssens
- Born: 30 December 1931 Belgium
- Died: 29 July 1992 (aged 60)

Cycling career
- Sport: Cycling
- Discipline: Road
- Role: Rider

Major wins
- 2nd place 1957 Tour de France; 2 stages Tour de France; Bordeaux–Paris (1960)

Marcel Janssens (30 December 1931, in Edegem – 29 July 1992, in Nukerke) was a Belgian professional road bicycle racer. Janssens won two stages in the Tour de France, and finished 2nd place in 1957 after Jacques Anquetil. He also won the 1960 edition of Bordeaux–Paris. He finished third place in the 1959 Paris–Roubaix.

== Major results ==
1945
Oostrozebeke
1951
Belgium National amateur road race Championship
1953
Mortsel
Bruxelles - Liège
Omloop der Vlaamse Gewesten
1954
Polder-Kempen
Zingem
Tongeren
1955
Aurillac
Brasschaat
Nederbrakel
Wilrijk
Schelde-Dender-Leie
Polder-Kempen
GP du Brabant Wallon
Tour de l'Ouest
1956
Wilrijk
1957
Tour de France:

Winner stage 4
2nd place overall classification

1958
Waarschoot
1959
Antwerpen - Ougrée
Aarschot
Tour de France:

Winner stage 10

1960
Libourne
Bordeaux–Paris
1961
Zele
1963
Herenthout
