= Adolf Christian =

Austrian cyclist

Personal information
- Full name: Adolf Christian
- Born: 3 June 1934 Vienna, Austria
- Died: 8 July 1999 (aged 65) Vienna, Austria

Cycling career
- Sport: Cycling
- Discipline: Road
- Role: Rider

Major wins
- 3rd place 1957 Tour de France

Adolf Christian (3 June 1934 in Vienna – 8 July 1999 in Vienna) was an Austrian professional road bicycle racer. In 1957, Christian finished 3rd place in the general classification of the Tour de France, and he is the only Austrian to legitimately reach the podium. (In 2008 Bernhard Kohl also reached 3rd position but was later disqualified for doping.) In January 1958, he became Sportsman of the Year 1957.

His profession was a decorator in his own company.

== Major results ==
1954
Austria national amateur road race champion
Vienna-Grabenstein-Gresten-Vienna
Vienna-Graz-Vienna
Tour of Austria
1955
GP Vorarlberg
1955
Vienna-Budapest-Vienna
Graz Rundfahrt
Vienna-Grabenstein-Gresten-Vienna
1957
Tour de France:

3rd place overall classification

1962
Tour de Hongrie
