= Louis Bergaud =

French cyclist (1928–2024)

Personal information
- Full name: Louis Bergaud
- Born: 30 November 1928 Jaleyrac, France
- Died: 21 May 2024 (aged 95)

Cycling career
- Sport: Cycling
- Discipline: Road
- Role: Rider
- Rider type: Climber

Major wins
- 2 stages Tour de France

Louis Bergaud (30 November 1928 – 21 May 2024) was a French professional road bicycle racer. Bergaud died on 21 May 2024, at the age of 95.

== Major results ==
1954
Tour de Corrèze
Tour de France:

7th place overall classification

1955
Felletin
Montluçon
Issoire
1956
Belvès
1957
Polymultipliée
Montélimar
1958
Bor-les-Orgues
Getxo
Polymultipliée
Tour de France:

9th place overall classification
Winner stage 13

1959
Circuit d'Auvergne
Pléaux
Saint-Flour
1961
Pléaux
Tour de France:

Winner stage 5
