= Lothar Friedrich =

German cyclist

Personal information
- Born: 11 December 1930 Völklingen, Germany
- Died: 19 April 2015 (aged 84)

Cycling career
- Sport: Cycling
- Role: Rider

Lothar Friedrich (11 December 1930 – 19 April 2015) was a German professional racing cyclist. He rode in four editions of the Tour de France.
