= Walter Favre =

Swiss cyclist

Personal information
- Full name: Walter Favre
- Born: 14 June 1931 Basel, Switzerland
- Died: 9 April 1970 (aged 38) Genève, Switzerland

Cycling career
- Sport: Cycling
- Role: Rider

Walter Favre (14 June 1931 – 9 April 1970) was a Swiss racing cyclist. He finished in last place in the 1958 Tour de France.
