= Jaap Kersten =

Dutch cyclist

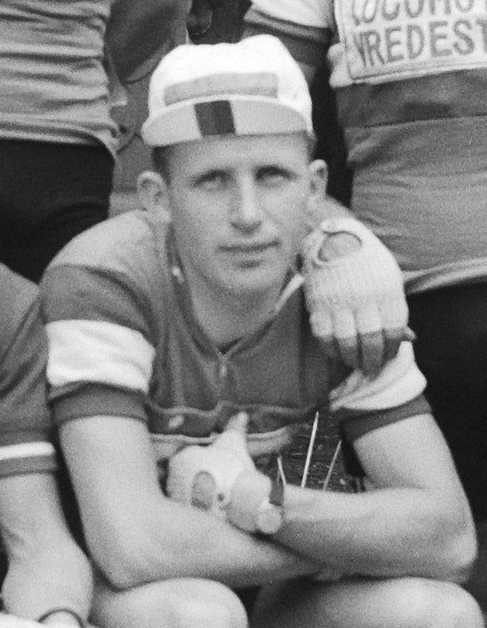
- Jaap Kersten in 1960

Personal information
- Born: 10 November 1934 (age 91) Siebengewald, Netherlands

Cycling career
- Sport: Cycling
- Role: Rider

Jaap Kersten (born 10 November 1934) is a Dutch former professional racing cyclist. He rode in five editions of the Tour de France.
