= Pierre Ruby =

French cyclist

Personal information
- Born: 20 September 1932 Bron, France
- Died: 27 May 2023 (aged 90) Chambray-lès-Tours, France

Cycling career
- Sport: Cycling
- Role: Rider

Pierre Ruby (20 September 1932 – 27 May 2023) was a French professional racing cyclist. He rode in five editions of the Tour de France.
