= Georges Gay =

French cyclist (1926–1997)

Personal information
- Born: 21 March 1926 Saint-Cirgues, Lot, France
- Died: 8 July 1997 (aged 71) Toulouse, France

Cycling career
- Sport: Cycling
- Role: Rider

Georges Gay (21 March 1926 – 8 July 1997) was a French professional racing cyclist. He rode in four editions of the Tour de France.
