= Piet van Est =

Dutch racing cyclist

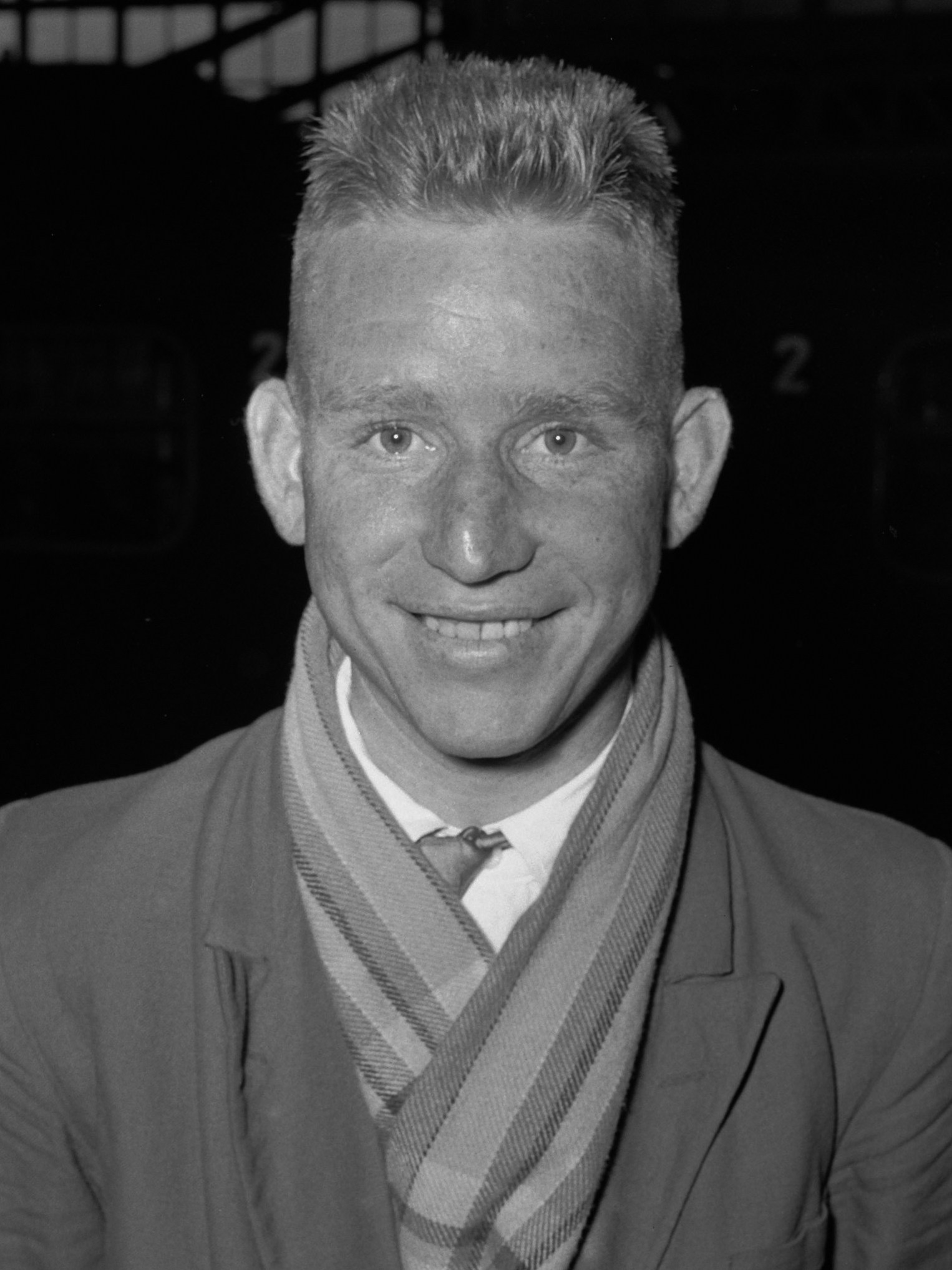
- Piet van Est in 1956

Personal information
- Born: 11 August 1934 Fijnaart, the Netherlands
- Died: 17 October 1991 (aged 57) Roosendaal, the Netherlands

Cycling career
- Sport: Cycling
- Discipline: Road
- Role: Rider

Piet van Est (11 August 1934 – 17 October 1991) was a Dutch racing cyclist. He rode the Tour de France in 1957–1962 and 1964, finishing within the first 30 places in 1958, 1960 and 1962. In 1961, he won one stage of the Giro d'Italia and finished 31st overall. He also won the Ronde van Nederland in 1958 and two stages of the race in 1963. His brothers Nico and Wim van Est were professional cyclists as well.
