= 1953 Tour de France, Stage 1 to Stage 11 =

Cycling race stages

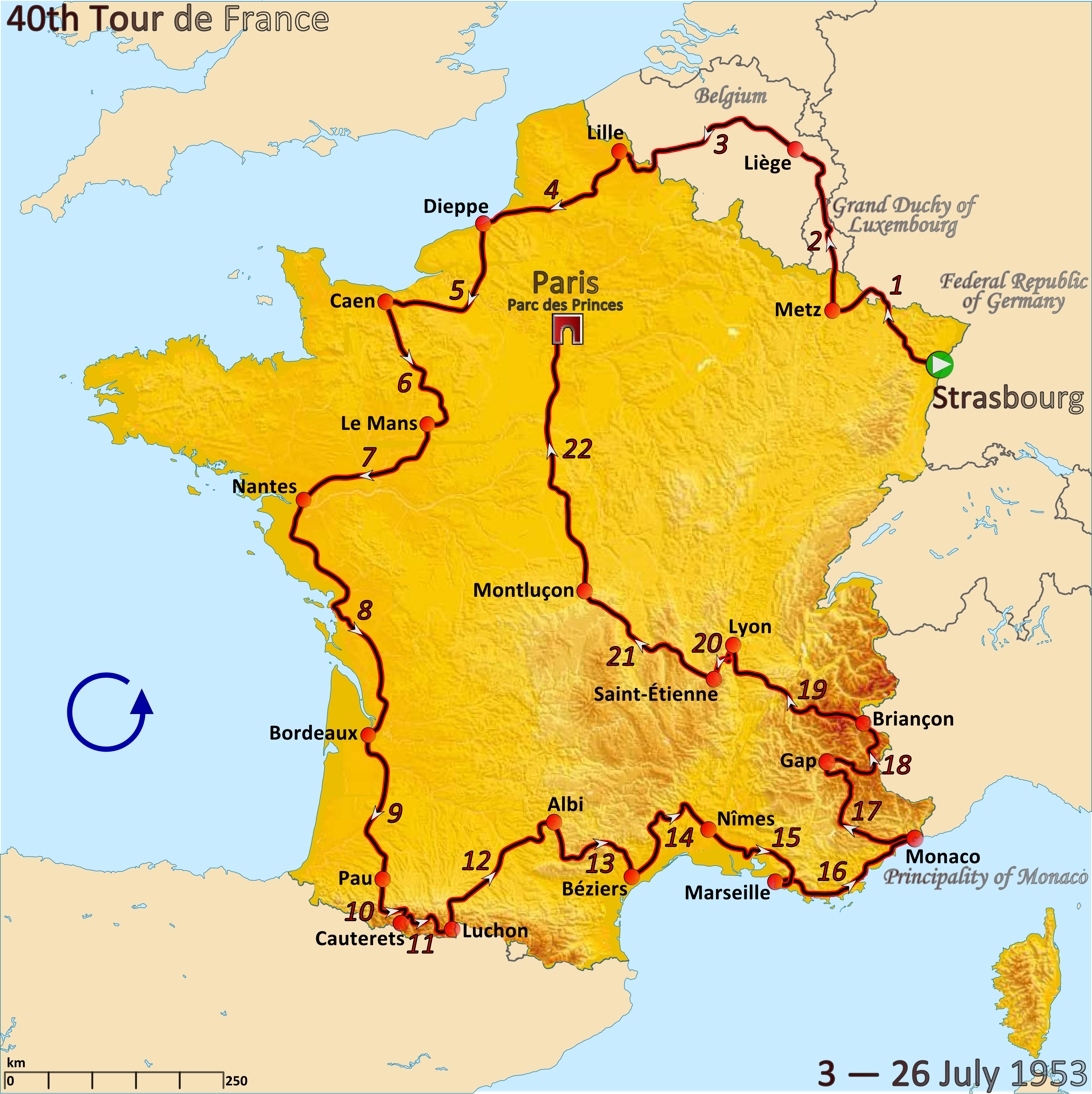
Route of the 1953 Tour de France; followed counterclockwise, starting in Strasbourg and finishing in Paris

The 1953 Tour de France was the 40th edition of the Tour de France, one of cycling's Grand Tours. It took place from 3 to 26 July, with 22 stages covering a distance of 4,479 km (2,783 mi).

The 1953 Tour de France saw the introduction of the points classification, which gives the green jersey to its leader.

The Tour began in Strasbourg on 3 July, and Stage 11 occurred on 14 July with a mountainous stage to Luchon. The race finished in Paris on 26 July.

== Classification standings ==
Legend (Note: Jerseys appearing in the table on the left of the page indicate those worn by the cyclist during the particular stage, while those appearing in the table on the right of the page indicate those awarded to the cyclist after the stage.)
A yellow jersey	Denotes the leader of the general classification	A green jersey	Denotes the leader of the points classification
MG	Denotes the leader of the mountains classification (Note: No jersey was awarded to the leader of the mountains classification until a white jersey with red polka dots was introduced in 1975.) (meilleur grimpeur)		
	s.t. indicates that the rider was credited with the same time as the one directly above him.		

== Stage 1 ==
3 July 1953 — Strasbourg to Metz, 195 km (121 mi)

Stage 1 result
Rank	Rider	Team	Time
1	Fritz Schär (SUI)	Switzerland	4h 55' 00"
2	Wout Wagtmans (NED)	Netherlands	s.t.
3	Thijs Roks (NED)	Netherlands	s.t.
4	Nello Lauredi (FRA)	France	s.t.
5	Jacques Dupont (FRA)	South-West	+ 3' 13"
6	Raphaël Géminiani (FRA)	France	s.t.
7	Vincenzo Rossello (ITA)	Italy	s.t.
8	Giancarlo Astrua (ITA)	Italy	s.t.
9	Attilio Redolfi (FRA)	Île-de-France	s.t.
10	Jean Robic (FRA)	West	s.t.

General classification after stage 1
Rank	Rider	Team	Time
1	Fritz Schär (SUI)	Switzerland	4h 54' 00"
2	Wout Wagtmans (NED)	Netherlands	+ 0' 30"
3	Thijs Roks (NED)	Netherlands	+ 1' 00"
4	Nello Lauredi (FRA)	France	+ 1' 00"
5	Jacques Dupont (FRA)	South-West	+ 4' 13"
6	Raphaël Géminiani (FRA)	France	s.t.
7	Vincenzo Rossello (ITA)	Italy	s.t.
8	Giancarlo Astrua (ITA)	Italy	s.t.
9	Attilio Redolfi (FRA)	Île-de-France	s.t.
10	Jean Robic (FRA)	West	s.t.

== Stage 2 ==
4 July 1953 — Metz to Liège (Belgium), 227 km (141 mi)

Stage 2 result
Rank	Rider	Team	Time
1	Fritz Schär (SUI)	Switzerland	6h 20' 52"
2	Wout Wagtmans (NED)	Netherlands	+ 0' 02"
3	Gino Bartali (ITA)	Italy	+ 0' 47"
4	Hugo Koblet (SUI)	Switzerland	s.t.
5	Fiorenzo Magni (ITA)	Italy	s.t.
6	Jean Robic (FRA)	West	s.t.
7	Alex Close (BEL)	Belgium	s.t.
8	Giancarlo Astrua (ITA)	Italy	s.t.
9	Ugo Anzile (ITA)	Italy	s.t.
10	Louison Bobet (FRA)	France	s.t.

General classification after stage 2
Rank	Rider	Team	Time
1	Fritz Schär (SUI)	Switzerland	11h 13' 52"
2	Wout Wagtmans (NED) MG	Netherlands	+ 1' 02"
3	Thijs Roks (NED)	Netherlands	+ 3' 55"
4	Vincenzo Rossello (ITA)	Italy	+ 6' 00"
5	Giancarlo Astrua (ITA)	Italy	s.t.
6	Jean Robic (FRA)	West	s.t.
7	Ugo Anzile (ITA)	Italy	s.t.
8	Gilbert Bauvin (FRA)	North-East/Centre	+ 8' 53"
9	Hein van Breenen (NED)	Netherlands	+ 10' 28"
10	Raphaël Géminiani (FRA)	France	s.t.

== Stage 3 ==
5 July 1953 — Liège (Belgium) to Lille, 221 km (137 mi)

Stage 3 result
Rank	Rider	Team	Time
1	Stanislas Bober (FRA)	Île-de-France	6h 06' 21"
2	Antonin Rolland (FRA)	France	+ 1' 12"
3	Alex Close (BEL)	Belgium	s.t.
4	Adolfo Grosso (ITA)	Italy	s.t.
5	Roger Hassenforder (FRA)	North-East/Centre	s.t.
6	Wim van Est (NED)	Netherlands	s.t.
7	Jacques Renaud (FRA)	Île-de-France	s.t.
8	José Serra (ESP)	Spain	+ 1' 31"
9	Alfred Tonello (FRA)	Île-de-France	+ 1' 36"
10	Georges Meunier (FRA)	North-East/Centre	+ 1' 38"

General classification after stage 3
Rank	Rider	Team	Time
1	Fritz Schär (SUI)	Switzerland	17h 28' 23"
2	Wout Wagtmans (NED) MG	Netherlands	+ 1' 02"
3	Jacques Renaud (FRA)	Île-de-France	+ 3' 30"
4	Thijs Roks (NED)	Netherlands	+ 3' 55"
5	Georges Meunier (FRA)	North-East/Centre	+ 3' 56"
6	Wim van Est (NED)	Netherlands	+ 5' 26"
7	Alex Close (BEL)	Belgium	+ 5' 39"
8	Giancarlo Astrua (ITA)	Italy	+ 6' 00"
9	Ugo Anzile (ITA)	Italy	s.t.
10	Jean Robic (FRA)	West	s.t.

== Stage 4 ==
6 July 1953 — Lille to Dieppe, 188 km (117 mi)

Stage 4 result
Rank	Rider	Team	Time
1	Gerrit Voorting (NED)	Netherlands	5h 20' 19"
2	Joseph Mirando (FRA)	South-East	s.t.
3	Nello Lauredi (FRA)	France	s.t.
4	Amand Audaire (FRA)	West	s.t.
5	André Darrigade (FRA)	South West	+ 5' 02"
6	Jan Nolten (NED)	Netherlands	s.t.
7	Hugo Koblet (SUI)	Switzerland	+ 5' 09"
8	Fiorenzo Magni (ITA)	Italy	s.t.
9	Jean Robic (FRA)	West	s.t.
10	Robert Vanderstockt (BEL)	Belgium	s.t.

General classification after stage 4
Rank	Rider	Team	Time
1	Fritz Schär (SUI)	Switzerland	22h 53' 51"
2	Wout Wagtmans (NED) MG	Netherlands	+ 1' 02"
3	Jacques Renaud (FRA)	Île-de-France	+ 3' 30"
4	Thijs Roks (NED)	Netherlands	+ 3' 55"
5	Georges Meunier (FRA)	North-East/Centre	+ 4' 43"
6	Wim van Est (NED)	Netherlands	+ 5' 26"
7	Alex Close (BEL)	Belgium	+ 5' 39"
8	Giancarlo Astrua (ITA)	Italy	+ 6' 00"
9	Ugo Anzile (ITA)	Italy	s.t.
10	Jean Robic (FRA)	West	s.t.

== Stage 5 ==
7 July 1953 — Dieppe to Caen, 200 km (120 mi)

Stage 5 result
Rank	Rider	Team	Time
1	Jean Malléjac (FRA)	West	5h 38' 35"
2	Roger Hassenforder (FRA)	North-East/Centre	+ 0' 13"
3	Alfred De Bruyne (BEL)	Belgium	s.t.
4	Maurice Diot (FRA)	Île-de-France	s.t.
5	Joseph Morvan (FRA)	Switzerland	s.t.
6	Émile Guérinel (FRA)	West	s.t.
7	Pierre Molinéris (FRA)	South-East	s.t.
8	Roger Walkowiak (FRA)	North-East/Centre	+ 1' 28"
9	Hugo Koblet (SUI)	Switzerland	+ 9' 43"
10	Fiorenzo Magni (ITA)	Italy	s.t.

General classification after stage 5
Rank	Rider	Team	Time
1	Roger Hassenforder (FRA)	North-East/Centre	22h 53' 51"
2	Fritz Schär (SUI)	Switzerland	+ 0' 48"
3	Wout Wagtmans (NED) MG	Netherlands	+ 1' 50"
4	Jacques Renaud (FRA)	Île-de-France	+ 4' 18"
5	Thijs Roks (NED)	Netherlands	+ 4' 43"
6	Georges Meunier (FRA)	North-East/Centre	+ 5' 31"
7	Wim van Est (NED)	Netherlands	+ 6' 14"
8	Alex Close (BEL)	Belgium	+ 6' 27"
9	Giancarlo Astrua (ITA)	Italy	+ 6' 48"
10	Ugo Anzile (ITA)	Italy	s.t.

== Stage 6 ==
8 July 1953 — Caen to Le Mans, 206 km (128 mi)

Stage 6 result
Rank	Rider	Team	Time
1	Martin Van Geneugden (BEL)	Belgium	5h 10' 53"
2	Louis Caput (FRA)	Île-de-France	s.t.
3	Adolphe Deledda (FRA)	France	s.t.
4	François Mahé (FRA)	West	s.t.
5	Hein van Breenen (NED)	Netherlands	s.t.
6	Gilbert Bauvin (FRA)	North-East/Centre	s.t.
7	Lucien Lazaridès (FRA)	South-East	s.t.
8	Edy Hein (LUX)	Luxembourg	+ 3' 13"
9	Adri Voorting (NED)	Netherlands	+ 4' 02"
10	Fiorenzo Magni (ITA)	Italy	+ 4' 13"

General classification after stage 6
Rank	Rider	Team	Time
1	Roger Hassenforder (FRA)	North-East/Centre	33h 56' 27"
2	Fritz Schär (SUI)	Switzerland	+ 0' 48"
3	Wout Wagtmans (NED) MG	Netherlands	+ 1' 50"
4	Jacques Renaud (FRA)	Île-de-France	+ 4' 18"
5	Thijs Roks (NED)	Netherlands	+ 4' 43"
6	Gilbert Bauvin (FRA)	North-East/Centre	+ 5' 28"
7	Georges Meunier (FRA)	North-East/Centre	+ 5' 31"
8	Wim van Est (NED)	Netherlands	+ 6' 14"
9	Alex Close (BEL)	Belgium	+ 6' 27"
10	Giancarlo Astrua (ITA)	Italy	+ 6' 48"

== Stage 7 ==
9 July 1953 — Le Mans to Nantes, 181 km (112 mi)

Stage 7 result
Rank	Rider	Team	Time
1	Livio Isotti (ITA)	Italy	4h 46' 08"
2	Maurice Quentin (FRA)	Île-de-France	s.t.
3	Bernard Quennehen (FRA)	North-East/Centre	s.t.
4	Raoul Rémy (FRA)	France	s.t.
5	Jacques Labertonnière (FRA)	North-East/Centre	s.t.
6	René Rotta (FRA)	South-East	s.t.
7	François Mahé (FRA)	West	+ 6' 31"
8	Hugo Koblet (SUI)	Switzerland	+ 8' 06"
9	André Darrigade (FRA)	South West	s.t.
10	Jean Robic (FRA)	West	s.t.

General classification after stage 7
Rank	Rider	Team	Time
1	Roger Hassenforder (FRA)	North-East/Centre	38h 50' 41"
2	Fritz Schär (SUI)	Switzerland	+ 0' 48"
3	Wout Wagtmans (NED) MG	Netherlands	+ 1' 50"
4	Jacques Renaud (FRA)	Île-de-France	+ 4' 18"
5	Thijs Roks (NED)	Netherlands	+ 4' 43"
6	Gilbert Bauvin (FRA)	North-East/Centre	+ 5' 28"
7	Georges Meunier (FRA)	North-East/Centre	+ 5' 31"
8	Wim van Est (NED)	Netherlands	+ 6' 14"
9	Alex Close (BEL)	Belgium	+ 6' 27"
10	François Mahé (FRA)	West	+ 6' 34"

== Stage 8 ==
10 July 1953 — Nantes to Bordeaux, 345 km (214 mi)

Stage 8 result
Rank	Rider	Team	Time
1	Jan Nolten (NED)	Netherlands	9h 56' 40"
2	Robert Vanderstockt (BEL)	Belgium	+ 1' 26"
3	Marcel Dierkens (LUX)	Luxembourg	+ 2' 24"
4	Bernard Bultel (FRA)	West	s.t.
5	Roger Walkowiak (FRA)	North-East/Centre	s.t.
6	José Serra (ESP)	Spain	+ 5' 25"
7	Bim Diederich (LUX)	Luxembourg	+ 5' 29"
8	Amand Audaire (FRA)	West	s.t.
9	Max Schellenberg (SUI)	Switzerland	s.t.
10	Gerrit Voorting (NED)	Netherlands	+ 5' 34"

General classification after stage 8
Rank	Rider	Team	Time
1	Roger Hassenforder (FRA)	North-East/Centre	48h 53' 18"
2	Fritz Schär (SUI)	Switzerland	+ 0' 48"
3	Wout Wagtmans (NED) MG	Netherlands	+ 1' 50"
4	Jacques Renaud (FRA)	Île-de-France	+ 4' 18"
5	Thijs Roks (NED)	Netherlands	+ 4' 43"
6	Gilbert Bauvin (FRA)	North-East/Centre	+ 5' 28"
7	Georges Meunier (FRA)	North-East/Centre	+ 5' 31"
8	Wim van Est (NED)	Netherlands	+ 6' 14"
9	Alex Close (BEL)	Belgium	+ 6' 27"
10	Gerrit Voorting (NED)	Netherlands	+ 6' 33"

== Stage 9 ==
12 July 1953 — Bordeaux to Pau, 197 km (122 mi)

Stage 9 result
Rank	Rider	Team	Time
1	Fiorenzo Magni (ITA)	Italy	5h 09' 58"
2	Hugo Koblet (SUI)	Switzerland	s.t.
3	Jean Robic (FRA)	West	s.t.
4	Fritz Schär (SUI)	Switzerland	s.t.
5	Gino Bartali (ITA)	Italy	s.t.
6	Wim van Est (NED)	Netherlands	s.t.
7	Raymond Impanis (BEL)	Belgium	s.t.
8	Jacques Dupont (FRA)	South-West	s.t.
9	Raphaël Géminiani (FRA)	France	s.t.
10	Antonin Rolland (FRA)	France	s.t.

General classification after stage 9
Rank	Rider	Team	Time
1	Fritz Schär (SUI)	Switzerland	54h 04' 04"
2	Wout Wagtmans (NED) MG	Netherlands	+ 1' 02"
3	Jacques Renaud (FRA)	Île-de-France	+ 3' 30"
4	Thijs Roks (NED)	Netherlands	+ 3' 55"
5	Gilbert Bauvin (FRA)	North-East/Centre	+ 4' 40"
6	Wim van Est (NED)	Netherlands	+ 5' 26"
7	Gerrit Voorting (NED)	Netherlands	+ 5' 45"
8	François Mahé (FRA)	West	+ 5' 46"
9	Giancarlo Astrua (ITA)	Italy	+ 6' 00"
10	Jean Robic (FRA)	West	s.t.

== Stage 10 ==
13 July 1953 — Pau to Cauterets, 103 km (64 mi)

Stage 10 result
Rank	Rider	Team	Time
1	Jesús Loroño (ESP)	Spain	3h 14' 30"
2	Jean Robic (FRA)	West	+ 5' 56"
3	Giancarlo Astrua (ITA)	Italy	s.t.
4	Fritz Schär (SUI)	Switzerland	s.t.
5	Louison Bobet (FRA)	France	+ 6' 04"
6	Richard Van Genechten (BEL)	Belgium	+ 6' 07"
7	Gilbert Bauvin (FRA)	North-East/Centre	s.t.
8	Antonin Rolland (FRA)	France	+ 6' 19"
9	Gino Bartali (ITA)	Italy	+ 6' 37"
10	Francisco Masip (ESP)	Spain	+ 7' 25"

General classification after stage 10
Rank	Rider	Team	Time
1	Fritz Schär (SUI)	Switzerland	57h 24' 30"
2	Wout Wagtmans (NED)	Netherlands	+ 3' 40"
3	Gilbert Bauvin (FRA)	North-East/Centre	+ 4' 51"
4	Jean Robic (FRA)	West	+ 5' 30"
5	Giancarlo Astrua (ITA)	Italy	+ 6' 00"
6	Alex Close (BEL)	Belgium	+ 9' 28"
7	François Mahé (FRA)	West	+ 9' 32"
8	Thijs Roks (NED)	Netherlands	+ 10' 34"
9	Raymond Impanis (BEL)	Belgium	+ 10' 58"
10	Jacques Renaud (FRA)	Île-de-France	+ 11' 00"

== Stage 11 ==
14 July 1953 — Cauterets to Luchon, 115 km (71 mi)

Stage 11 result
Rank	Rider	Team	Time
1	Jean Robic (FRA)	West	3h 50' 06"
2	Louison Bobet (FRA)	France	+ 1' 27"
3	Gilbert Bauvin (FRA)	North-East/Centre	+ 1' 29"
4	Fritz Schär (SUI)	Switzerland	+ 4' 48"
5	Nello Lauredi (FRA)	France	+ 5' 33"
6	Gino Bartali (ITA)	Italy	+ 5' 42"
7	Marcel Ernzer (LUX)	Luxembourg	s.t.
8	Giancarlo Astrua (ITA)	Italy	s.t.
9	Vicente Iturat (ESP)	Spain	s.t.
10	Antonin Rolland (FRA)	France	s.t.

General classification after stage 11
Rank	Rider	Team	Time
1	Jean Robic (FRA) MG	West	61h 19' 06"
2	Fritz Schär (SUI)	Switzerland	+ 0' 18"
3	Gilbert Bauvin (FRA)	North-East/Centre	+ 1' 50"
4	Giancarlo Astrua (ITA)	Italy	+ 7' 12"
5	Louison Bobet (FRA)	France	+ 9' 12"
6	Alex Close (BEL)	Belgium	+ 10' 40"
7	François Mahé (FRA)	West	+ 11' 54"
8	Nello Lauredi (FRA)	France	+ 12' 54"
9	Marcel Ernzer (LUX)	Luxembourg	+ 13' 12"
10	Antonin Rolland (FRA)	France	+ 13' 48"
