= 1953 Tour de France, Stage 12 to Stage 22 =

Cycling race stages

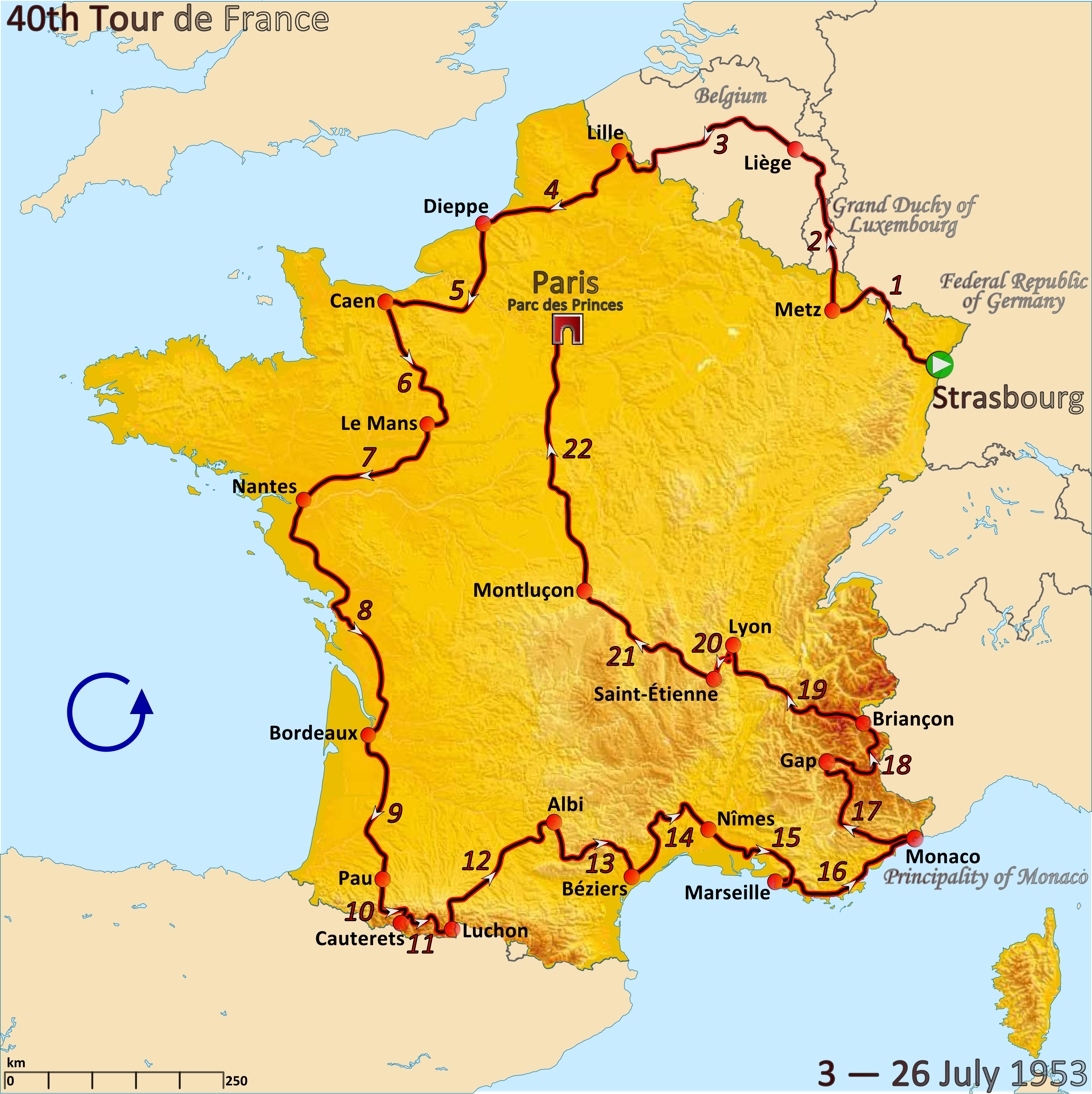
Route of the 1953 Tour de France; followed counterclockwise, starting in Strasbourg and finishing in Paris

The 1953 Tour de France was the 40th edition of the Tour de France, one of cycling's Grand Tours. It took place from 3 to 26 July, with 22 stages covering a distance of 4,479 km (2,783 mi).

The Tour began in Strasbourg on 3 July, and Stage 12 occurred on 15 July with a flat stage from Luchon. The race finished in Paris on 26 July.

Jean Robic entered the stage 12 as the first cyclist in the history of the Tour de France to ever lead in the three most important classifications: he wore the yellow jersey, green jersey and led King of the Mountains ranking.

== Classification standings ==
Legend (Note: Jerseys appearing in the table on the left of the page indicate those worn by the cyclist during the particular stage, while those appearing in the table on the right of the page indicate those awarded to the cyclist after the stage.)
A yellow jersey	Denotes the leader of the general classification	A green jersey	Denotes the leader of the points classification
MG	Denotes the leader of the mountains classification (Note: No jersey was awarded to the leader of the mountains classification until a white jersey with red polka dots was introduced in 1975.) (meilleur grimpeur)		
	s.t. indicates that the rider was credited with the same time as the one directly above him.		

== Stage 12 ==
15 July 1953 — Luchon to Albi, 228 km (142 mi)

Stage 12 result
Rank	Rider	Team	Time
1	André Darrigade (FRA)	South West	5h 40' 40"
2	Martin Van Geneugden (BEL)	Belgium	s.t.
3	Hubert Bastianelli (FRA)	South-West	s.t.
4	Hilaire Couvreur (BEL)	Belgium	s.t.
5	Maurice Quentin (FRA)	Île-de-France	s.t.
6	Jean Forestier (FRA)	North-East/Centre	s.t.
7	Jan Adriaensens (BEL)	Belgium	s.t.
8	Andrés Trobat (ESP)	Spain	s.t.
9	Marcel Ernzer (LUX)	Luxembourg	s.t.
10	Willy Kemp (LUX)	Luxembourg	s.t.

General classification after stage 12
Rank	Rider	Team	Time
1	François Mahé (FRA)	West	67h 11' 40"
2	Marcel Ernzer (LUX)	Luxembourg	+ 1' 18"
3	Ugo Anzile (ITA)	Italy	+ 2' 23"
4	Jean Robic (FRA) MG	West	+ 8' 50"
5	Fritz Schär (SUI)	Switzerland	+ 9' 08"
6	Gilbert Bauvin (FRA)	North-East/Centre	+ 10' 40"
7	Wim van Est (NED)	Netherlands	+ 10' 59"
8	Jacques Renaud (FRA)	Île-de-France	+ 12' 50"
9	Jean Malléjac (FRA)	West	+ 14' 49"
10	Giancarlo Astrua (ITA)	Italy	+ 16' 02"

== Stage 13 ==
16 July 1953 — Albi to Béziers, 189 km (117 mi)

Stage 13 result
Rank	Rider	Team	Time
1	Nello Lauredi (FRA)	France	5h 18' 41"
2	Raphaël Géminiani (FRA)	France	s.t.
3	Louison Bobet (FRA)	France	s.t.
4	Antonin Rolland (FRA)	France	s.t.
5	Giancarlo Astrua (ITA)	Italy	s.t.
6	Wout Wagtmans (NED)	Netherlands	s.t.
7	Joseph Mirando (FRA)	South-East	s.t.
8	Alex Close (BEL)	Belgium	s.t.
9	Jean Malléjac (FRA)	West	s.t.
10	Fiorenzo Magni (ITA)	Italy	+ 6' 59"

General classification after stage 13
Rank	Rider	Team	Time
1	Jean Malléjac (FRA)	West	72h 45' 10"
2	Giancarlo Astrua (ITA)	Italy	+ 1' 13"
3	Louison Bobet (FRA)	France	+ 3' 13"
4	Gilbert Bauvin (FRA)	North-East/Centre	+ 4' 24"
5	Alex Close (BEL)	Belgium	+ 4' 41"
6	François Mahé (FRA)	West	+ 5' 02"
7	Nello Lauredi (FRA)	France	+ 5' 55"
8	Fritz Schär (SUI)	Switzerland	+ 6' 08"
9	Ugo Anzile (ITA)	Italy	+ 7' 25"
10	Antonin Rolland (FRA)	France	+ 7' 49"

== Stage 14 ==
17 July 1953 — Béziers to Nîmes, 214 km (133 mi)

Stage 14 result
Rank	Rider	Team	Time
1	Bernard Quennehen (FRA)	North-East/Centre	6h 21' 23"
2	Alfred Tonello (FRA)	Île-de-France	s.t.
3	Jean Le Guilly (FRA)	France	s.t.
4	Jan Nolten (NED)	Netherlands	s.t.
5	René Rotta (FRA)	South-East	+ 0' 09"
6	André Darrigade (FRA)	South West	+ 13' 54"
7	Fiorenzo Magni (ITA)	Italy	s.t.
8	Wim van Est (NED)	Netherlands	s.t.
9	Fritz Schär (SUI)	Switzerland	s.t.
10	Mario Baroni (ITA)	Italy	s.t.

General classification after stage 14
Rank	Rider	Team	Time
1	Jean Malléjac (FRA)	West	79h 20' 27"
2	Giancarlo Astrua (ITA)	Italy	+ 1' 13"
3	Louison Bobet (FRA)	France	+ 3' 13"
4	Gilbert Bauvin (FRA)	North-East/Centre	+ 4' 24"
5	Alex Close (BEL)	Belgium	+ 4' 41"
6	François Mahé (FRA)	West	+ 5' 02"
7	Nello Lauredi (FRA)	France	+ 5' 55"
8	Fritz Schär (SUI)	Switzerland	+ 6' 08"
9	Ugo Anzile (ITA)	Italy	+ 7' 25"
10	Antonin Rolland (FRA)	France	+ 7' 49"

== Stage 15 ==
18 July 1953 — Nîmes to Marseille, 173 km (107 mi)

Stage 15 result
Rank	Rider	Team	Time
1	Maurice Quentin (FRA)	Île-de-France	4h 32' 33"
2	Adri Voorting (NED)	Netherlands	s.t.
3	Jean Forestier (FRA)	North-East/Centre	s.t.
4	Mario Baroni (ITA)	Italy	+ 0' 23"
5	Max Schellenberg (SUI)	Switzerland	s.t.
6	Raoul Rémy (FRA)	France	s.t.
7	Pierre Molinéris (FRA)	South-East	s.t.
8	Vincent Vitetta (FRA)	South-East	s.t.
9	José Serra (ESP)	Spain	+ 2' 35"
10	Vicente Iturat (ESP)	Spain	+ 4' 46"

General classification after stage 15
Rank	Rider	Team	Time
1	Jean Malléjac (FRA)	West	84h 00' 02"
2	Giancarlo Astrua (ITA)	Italy	+ 1' 13"
3	Louison Bobet (FRA)	France	+ 3' 13"
4	Alex Close (BEL)	Belgium	+ 4' 41"
5	Antonin Rolland (FRA)	France	+ 5' 50"
6	Nello Lauredi (FRA)	France	+ 5' 55"
7	Fritz Schär (SUI)	Switzerland	+ 7' 51"
8	François Mahé (FRA)	West	+ 8' 02"
9	Raphaël Géminiani (FRA)	France	+ 8' 15"
10	Gilbert Bauvin (FRA)	North-East/Centre	+ 8' 59"

== Stage 16 ==
19 July 1953 — Marseille to Monaco, 236 km (147 mi)

Stage 16 result
Rank	Rider	Team	Time
1	Wim van Est (NED)	Netherlands	7h 20' 53"
2	Pierre Molinéris (FRA)	South-East	+ 1' 49"
3	Richard Van Genechten (BEL)	Belgium	+ 2' 19"
4	Joseph Mirando (FRA)	South-East	s.t.
5	Fritz Schär (SUI)	Switzerland	+ 3' 49"
6	Fiorenzo Magni (ITA)	Italy	+ 4' 15"
7	Gino Bartali (ITA)	Italy	s.t.
8	Giancarlo Astrua (ITA)	Italy	s.t.
9	Francisco Masip (ESP)	Spain	s.t.
10	Jean Malléjac (FRA)	West	s.t.

General classification after stage 16
Rank	Rider	Team	Time
1	Jean Malléjac (FRA)	West	91h 25' 10"
2	Giancarlo Astrua (ITA)	Italy	+ 1' 13"
3	Louison Bobet (FRA)	France	+ 3' 13"
4	Alex Close (BEL)	Belgium	+ 5' 38"
5	Antonin Rolland (FRA)	France	+ 6' 47"
6	Nello Lauredi (FRA)	France	+ 6' 52"
7	Fritz Schär (SUI)	Switzerland	+ 7' 25"
8	Raphaël Géminiani (FRA)	France	+ 8' 15"
9	Gilbert Bauvin (FRA)	North-East/Centre	+ 9' 38"
10	François Mahé (FRA)	West	+ 12' 44"

== Stage 17 ==
21 July 1953 — Monaco to Gap, 261 km (162 mi)

Stage 17 result
Rank	Rider	Team	Time
1	Wout Wagtmans (NED)	Netherlands	8h 18' 34"
2	Gino Bartali (ITA)	Italy	+ 0' 44"
3	Gerrit Voorting (NED)	Netherlands	s.t.
4	Antonin Rolland (FRA)	France	s.t.
5	Georges Meunier (FRA)	North-East/Centre	+ 1' 10"
6	José Serra (ESP)	Spain	+ 1' 15"
7	Vincenzo Rossello (ITA)	Italy	+ 2' 10"
8	Andrés Trobat (ESP)	Spain	s.t.
9	Stanislas Bober (FRA)	Île-de-France	s.t.
10	Marcel Huber (SUI)	Switzerland	s.t.

General classification after stage 17
Rank	Rider	Team	Time
1	Jean Malléjac (FRA)	West	99h 47' 35"
2	Giancarlo Astrua (ITA)	Italy	+ 1' 13"
3	Louison Bobet (FRA)	France	+ 3' 13"
4	Antonin Rolland (FRA)	France	+ 3' 51"
5	Alex Close (BEL)	Belgium	+ 5' 38"
6	Nello Lauredi (FRA)	France	+ 6' 52"
7	Fritz Schär (SUI)	Switzerland	+ 7' 25"
8	Raphaël Géminiani (FRA)	France	+ 8' 15"
9	Gilbert Bauvin (FRA)	North-East/Centre	+ 9' 38"
10	Wout Wagtmans (NED)	Netherlands	+ 9' 39"

== Stage 18 ==
22 July 1953 — Gap to Briançon, 165 km (103 mi)

Stage 18 result
Rank	Rider	Team	Time
1	Louison Bobet (FRA)	France	5h 11' 17"
2	Jan Nolten (NED)	Netherlands	+ 5' 23"
3	Jesús Loroño (ESP) MG	Spain	+ 5' 57"
4	José Serra (ESP)	Spain	+ 8' 22"
5	Alex Close (BEL)	Belgium	+ 8' 30"
6	Lucien Lazaridès (FRA)	South-East	+ 9' 44"
7	Fritz Schär (SUI)	Switzerland	+ 9' 45"
8	Wout Wagtmans (NED)	Netherlands	+ 9' 48"
9	Gino Bartali (ITA)	Italy	+ 10' 29"
10	Raphaël Géminiani (FRA)	France	+ 10' 48"

General classification after stage 18
Rank	Rider	Team	Time
1	Louison Bobet (FRA)	France	105h 01' 05"
2	Jean Malléjac (FRA)	West	+ 8' 35"
3	Giancarlo Astrua (ITA)	Italy	+ 9' 48"
4	Alex Close (BEL)	Belgium	+ 11' 55"
5	Fritz Schär (SUI)	Switzerland	+ 14' 57"
6	Antonin Rolland (FRA)	France	+ 16' 26"
7	Nello Lauredi (FRA)	France	+ 16' 45"
8	Raphaël Géminiani (FRA)	France	+ 16' 50"
9	Wout Wagtmans (NED)	Netherlands	+ 17' 14"
10	François Mahé (FRA)	West	+ 21' 24"

== Stage 19 ==
23 July 1953 — Briançon to Lyon, 227 km (141 mi)

Stage 19 result
Rank	Rider	Team	Time
1	Georges Meunier (FRA)	North-East/Centre	6h 18' 15"
2	Jean Forestier (FRA)	North-East/Centre	s.t.
3	Dalmacio Langarica (ESP)	Spain	s.t.
4	Jesús Loroño (ESP) MG	Spain	+ 2' 36"
5	Hilaire Couvreur (BEL)	Belgium	+ 7' 10"
6	Amand Audaire (FRA)	West	+ 9' 59"
7	Fiorenzo Magni (ITA)	Italy	s.t.
8	Giovanni Corrieri (ITA)	Italy	s.t.
9	Fritz Schär (SUI)	Switzerland	s.t.
10	Raymond Impanis (BEL)	Belgium	s.t.

General classification after stage 19
Rank	Rider	Team	Time
1	Louison Bobet (FRA)	France	111h 29' 19"
2	Jean Malléjac (FRA)	West	+ 8' 35"
3	Giancarlo Astrua (ITA)	Italy	+ 9' 48"
4	Alex Close (BEL)	Belgium	+ 11' 55"
5	Fritz Schär (SUI)	Switzerland	+ 14' 57"
6	Antonin Rolland (FRA)	France	+ 16' 26"
7	Nello Lauredi (FRA)	France	+ 16' 45"
8	Raphaël Géminiani (FRA)	France	+ 16' 50"
9	Wout Wagtmans (NED)	Netherlands	+ 17' 14"
10	François Mahé (FRA)	West	+ 21' 24"

== Stage 20 ==
24 July 1953 — Lyon to Saint-Étienne, 70 km (43 mi) (ITT)

Stage 20 result
Rank	Rider	Team	Time
1	Louison Bobet (FRA)	France	1h 49' 00"
2	Wim van Est (NED)	Netherlands	+ 1' 45"
3	Fritz Schär (SUI)	Switzerland	+ 2' 47"
4	Wout Wagtmans (NED)	Netherlands	+ 3' 25"
5	Jesús Loroño (ESP) MG	Spain	+ 3' 56"
6	Gilbert Bauvin (FRA)	North-East/Centre	+ 3' 57"
7	Giancarlo Astrua (ITA)	Italy	+ 4' 13"
8	Joseph Morvan (FRA)	Switzerland	+ 4' 39"
9	Alex Close (BEL)	Belgium	+ 4' 40"
10	Jean Malléjac (FRA)	West	+ 4' 43"

General classification after stage 20
Rank	Rider	Team	Time
1	Louison Bobet (FRA)	France	113h 17' 19"
2	Jean Malléjac (FRA)	West	+ 14' 18"
3	Giancarlo Astrua (ITA)	Italy	+ 15' 01"
4	Alex Close (BEL)	Belgium	+ 17' 35"
5	Fritz Schär (SUI)	Switzerland	+ 18' 44"
6	Wout Wagtmans (NED)	Netherlands	+ 21' 39"
7	Antonin Rolland (FRA)	France	+ 23' 03"
8	Nello Lauredi (FRA)	France	+ 24' 06"
9	Raphaël Géminiani (FRA)	France	+ 27' 18"
10	François Mahé (FRA)	West	+ 28' 26"

== Stage 21 ==
25 July 1953 — Saint-Étienne to Montluçon, 210 km (130 mi)

Stage 21 result
Rank	Rider	Team	Time
1	Wout Wagtmans (NED)	Netherlands	6h 20' 08"
2	Gilbert Bauvin (FRA)	North-East/Centre	s.t.
3	Jan Nolten (NED)	Netherlands	+ 2' 11"
4	Pierre Molinéris (FRA)	South-East	s.t.
5	Jacques Renaud (FRA)	Île-de-France	+ 2' 16"
6	Livio Isotti (ITA)	Italy	+ 2' 29"
7	Vincent Vitetta (FRA)	South-East	s.t.
8	Fiorenzo Magni (ITA)	Italy	+ 2' 34"
9	André Darrigade (FRA)	South West	s.t.
10	Mario Baroni (ITA)	Italy	s.t.

General classification after stage 21
Rank	Rider	Team	Time
1	Louison Bobet (FRA)	France	119h 40' 01"
2	Jean Malléjac (FRA)	West	+ 14' 18"
3	Giancarlo Astrua (ITA)	Italy	+ 15' 01"
4	Alex Close (BEL)	Belgium	+ 17' 35"
5	Wout Wagtmans (NED)	Netherlands	+ 18' 05"
6	Fritz Schär (SUI)	Switzerland	+ 18' 44"
7	Antonin Rolland (FRA)	France	+ 23' 03"
8	Nello Lauredi (FRA)	France	+ 24' 06"
9	Raphaël Géminiani (FRA)	France	+ 27' 18"
10	François Mahé (FRA)	West	+ 28' 26"

== Stage 22 ==
26 July 1953 — Montluçon to Paris (Parc des Princes), 328 km (204 mi)

Stage 22 result
Rank	Rider	Team	Time
1	Fiorenzo Magni (ITA)	Italy	9h 42' 53"
2	Mario Baroni (ITA)	Italy	s.t.
3	Jean Forestier (FRA)	North-East/Centre	s.t.
4	Hilaire Couvreur (BEL)	Belgium	s.t.
5	Joseph Morvan (FRA)	Switzerland	s.t.
6	Bernard Gauthier (FRA)	France	s.t.
7	Umberto Drei (ITA)	Italy	s.t.
8	Pierre Molinéris (FRA)	South-East	s.t.
9	Gerrit Voorting (NED)	Netherlands	s.t.
10	Antonin Rolland (FRA)	France	+ 0' 31"

General classification after stage 22
Rank	Rider	Team	Time
1	Louison Bobet (FRA)	France	129h 23' 25"
2	Jean Malléjac (FRA)	West	+ 14' 18"
3	Giancarlo Astrua (ITA)	Italy	+ 15' 01"
4	Alex Close (BEL)	Belgium	+ 17' 35"
5	Wout Wagtmans (NED)	Netherlands	+ 18' 05"
6	Fritz Schär (SUI)	Switzerland	+ 18' 44"
7	Antonin Rolland (FRA)	France	+ 23' 03"
8	Nello Lauredi (FRA)	France	+ 26' 03"
9	Raphaël Géminiani (FRA)	France	+ 27' 18"
10	François Mahé (FRA)	West	+ 28' 26"
