= 1953 Tour de France =

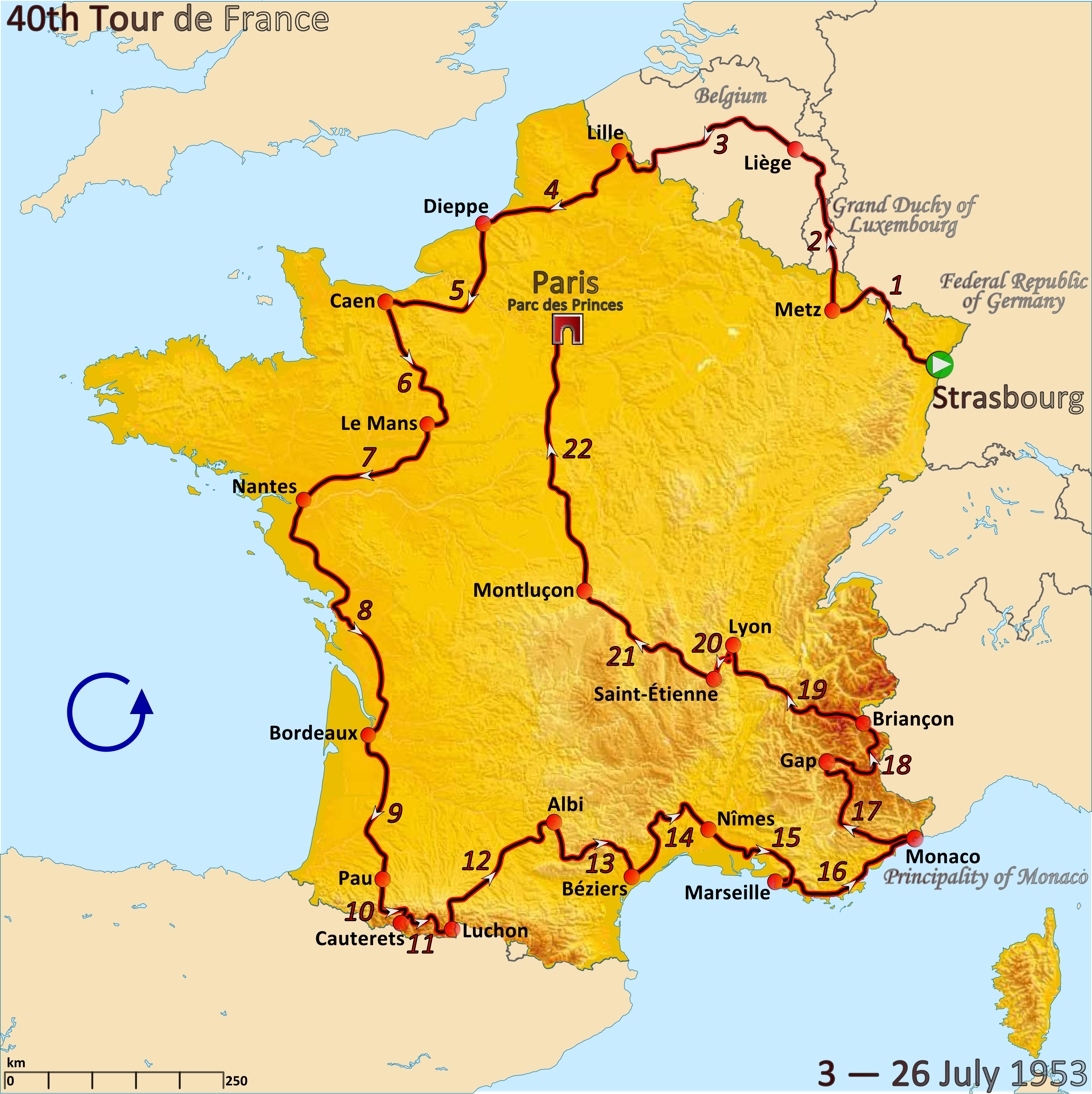
- Route of the 1953 Tour de France followed counterclockwise, starting in Strasbourg and finishing in Paris

Race details
- Dates: 3–26 July 1953
- Stages: 22
- Distance: 4,476 km (2,781 mi)
- Winning time: 129h 23' 25"

Results
Jersey awarded to the overall winner	Winner	Louison Bobet (FRA)	(France)
	Second	Jean Malléjac (FRA)	(West)
	Third	Giancarlo Astrua (ITA)	(Italy)
Jersey awarded to the points classification winner	Points	Fritz Schär (SUI)	(Switzerland)
	Mountains	Jesús Loroño (ESP)	(Spain)
	Combativity	Wout Wagtmans (NED)	(Netherlands)
	Team	Netherlands	

The 1953 Tour de France was the 40th edition of the Tour de France, taking place from 3 to 26 July. It consisted of 22 stages over 4,476 km (2,781 mi).

The race was won by Louison Bobet, the first of his three consecutive wins. At first, internal struggles in the French national team seemed to work against Bobet, but when the team joined forces, he beat regional rider Jean Malléjac in the mountains.

The 1953 Tour de France saw the introduction of the points classification, which gives the green jersey to its leader. In 1953 this was won by Fritz Schär.

== Innovations and changes ==
Changes in the Tour formula were made: Only one time trial was used, instead of two the previous year; the time bonus for the first cyclist to cross a mountain top was removed; there were fewer mountain stages; the number of cyclists per team was increased from 8 to 10. Since all these changes were bad for 1952's winner Fausto Coppi, who had gained significant time in 1952 in the time trials and mountain stages, the Tour organisation was accused of favoring French riders.

== Teams ==
As was the custom since the 1930 Tour de France, the 1953 Tour de France was contested by national and regional teams. Seven national teams were sent, with 10 cyclists each from Italy, Switzerland, Belgium, Spain, Luxembourg, the Netherlands and France. France additionally sent five regional teams from 10 cyclists each, divided into Île-de-France, Center-North East France, South-East, West and South West. One Luxembourgian cyclist did not start, so 119 cyclists started the race.

The teams entering the race were:

- Italy
- Switzerland
- Belgium
- Spain
- Luxembourg
- Netherlands
- France
- Île-de-France
- North-East/Centre
- South-East
- West
- South-West

== Pre-race favourites ==
The winner of the previous edition, Coppi, did not defend his title. The reasons were not clear: it could have been injury, but it was also possible that Coppi did not want to ride in the same team as his rival Gino Bartali, or that the Tour direction urged the Italian team not to select Coppi because he had dominated the 1952 Tour, or that Coppi chose to prepare for the 1953 UCI Road World Championships. The big favourites became Hugo Koblet and Louison Bobet.

The last five editions had been won by Italian and Swiss cyclists, so the French cycling fans were anxious for a French win. When team manager Marcel Bidot had selected Bobet as the French team captain, controversy arose. Bobet had shown his potential strength, but had already tried to win the Tour de France five times without succeeding. His team-mate Raphaël Géminiani thought that Bobet was not strong enough, after he did not finish the 1953 Giro d'Italia earlier that year.

== Route and stages ==
The 1953 Tour de France started on 3 July, and had two rest days, in Bordeaux and Monaco. The highest point of elevation in the race was 2,360 m (7,740 ft) at the summit of the Col d'Izoard mountain pass on stage 18.

Stage characteristics and winners
Stage	Date	Course	Distance	Type	Winner
1	3 July	Strasbourg to Metz	195 km (121 mi)	Plain stage	Fritz Schär (SUI)
2	4 July	Metz to Liège (Belgium)	227 km (141 mi)	Plain stage	Fritz Schär (SUI)
3	5 July	Liège (Belgium) to Lille	221 km (137 mi)	Plain stage	Stanislas Bober (FRA)
4	6 July	Lille to Dieppe	188 km (117 mi)	Plain stage	Gerrit Voorting (NED)
5	7 July	Dieppe to Caen	200 km (124 mi)	Plain stage	Jean Malléjac (FRA)
6	8 July	Caen to Le Mans	206 km (128 mi)	Plain stage	Martin Van Geneugden (BEL)
7	9 July	Le Mans to Nantes	181 km (112 mi)	Plain stage	Livio Isotti (ITA)
8	10 July	Nantes to Bordeaux	345 km (214 mi)	Plain stage	Jan Nolten (NED)
	11 July	Bordeaux		Rest day	
9	12 July	Bordeaux to Pau	197 km (122 mi)	Plain stage	Fiorenzo Magni (ITA)
10	13 July	Pau to Cauterets	103 km (64 mi)	Stage with mountain(s)	Jesús Loroño (ESP)
11	14 July	Cauterets to Luchon	115 km (71 mi)	Stage with mountain(s)	Jean Robic (FRA)
12	15 July	Luchon to Albi	228 km (142 mi)	Plain stage	André Darrigade (FRA)
13	16 July	Albi to Béziers	189 km (117 mi)	Stage with mountain(s)	Nello Lauredi (FRA)
14	17 July	Béziers to Nîmes	214 km (133 mi)	Stage with mountain(s)	Bernard Quennehen (FRA)
15	18 July	Nîmes to Marseille	173 km (107 mi)	Plain stage	Maurice Quentin (FRA)
16	19 July	Marseille to Monaco	236 km (147 mi)	Stage with mountain(s)	Wim van Est (NED)
	20 July	Monaco		Rest day	
17	21 July	Monaco to Gap	261 km (162 mi)	Stage with mountain(s)	Wout Wagtmans (NED)
18	22 July	Gap to Briançon	165 km (103 mi)	Stage with mountain(s)	Louison Bobet (FRA)
19	23 July	Briançon to Lyon	227 km (141 mi)	Stage with mountain(s)	Georges Meunier (FRA)
20	24 July	Lyon to St. Etienne	70 km (43 mi)	Individual time trial	Louison Bobet (FRA)
21	25 July	St. Etienne to Montluçon	210 km (130 mi)	Plain stage	Wout Wagtmans (NED)
22	26 July	Montluçon to Paris	328 km (204 mi)	Plain stage	Fiorenzo Magni (ITA)
	Total		4,476 km (2,781 mi)		

== Race overview ==
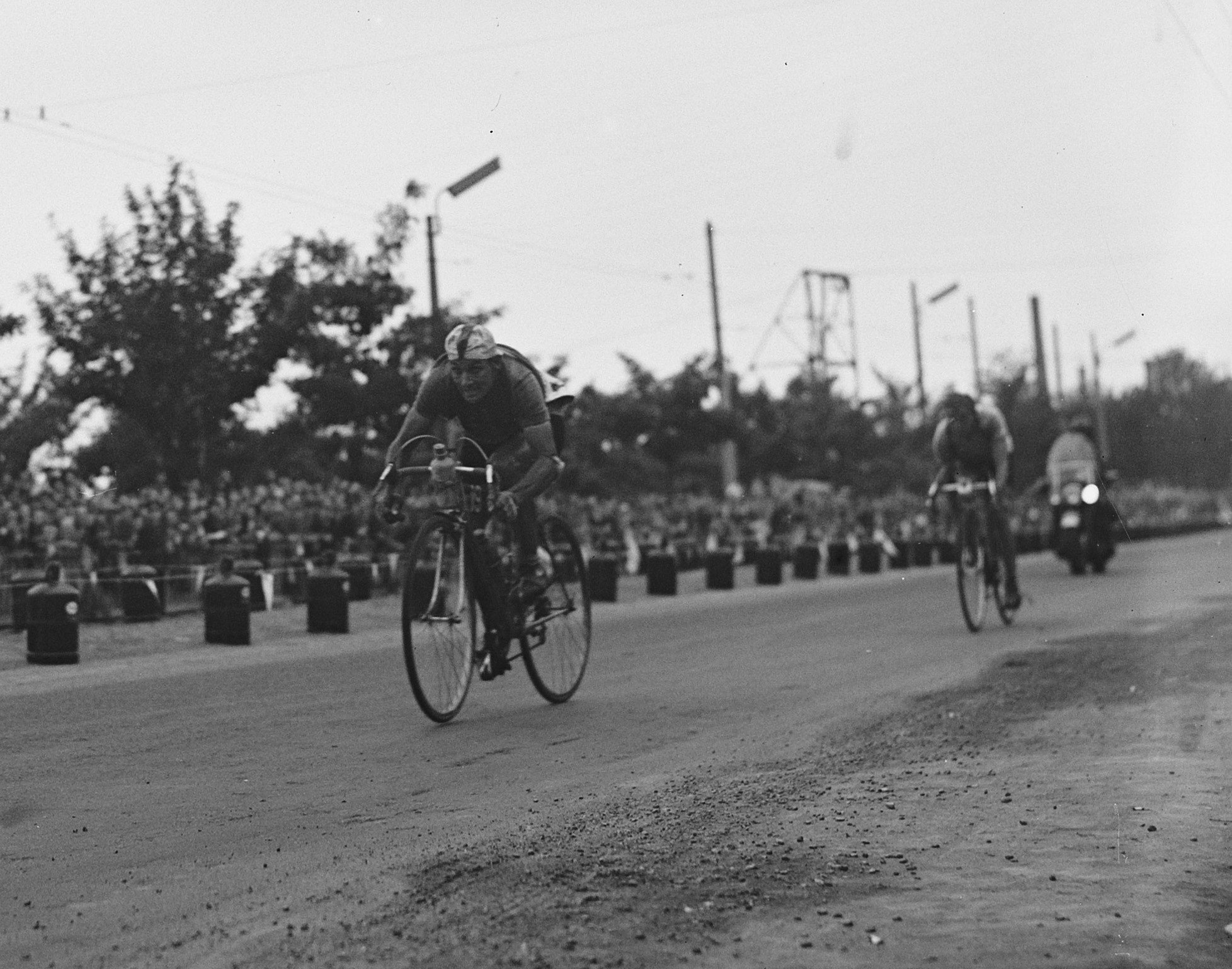
Fritz Schär taking his second win of the race on stage two in Liège, Belgium

In the first two stages Fritz Schär won the sprint. The favourites remained calm. After the fourth stage, French Roger Hassenforder took the lead, but he soon lost it when the mountains appeared.

Hassenforder was ill, and could not follow in the mountains, so Schär took the lead back in the ninth stage. In the next stage, Hugo Koblet, the leader of the Swiss team, fell and had to give up, making Schär the undisputed leader of the Swiss team.

Jean Robic, the winner of the 1947 Tour de France, rode for the regional team from West. He was in great shape, and won the 11th stage, and even took the leading position in the general classification. In the next stage, Robic rode in the yellow jersey for the first and only time in his career. Robic had won the 1947 Tour de France, but only captured the lead in the ultimate stage, so he never wore the yellow jersey during that race. Robic was a good climber, but he was not heavy enough to be a good descender. It is said that the manager of his team had arranged bidons filled with lead, that would be given to Robic on the top of the mountains. This helped Robic to keep his lead on the descent.

Robic lost the yellow jersey in the next stage, after he crashed and the French national team attacked. A large group of twenty five cyclists, without any of the favourites, had escaped and stayed away. Robic's team did not lose the jersey however, as first François Mahé took over the lead.

In the next stage, the favourites attacked again. Mahé could not keep up, and lost his leading position to his team-mate Jean Malléjac. The sprint was won by Nello Lauredi from the French national team, before his team-mate Bobet. Bobet was angry that Lauredi had won the sprint, because it made Bobet miss the one-minute time bonus for the winner of the stage. Bobet accused Lauredi and Géminiani of working against him, and during dinner it came to a fight. The French team captain intervened, and they found a solution: Bobet agreed to give his prize money to his team-mates, if they helped him win the Tour.

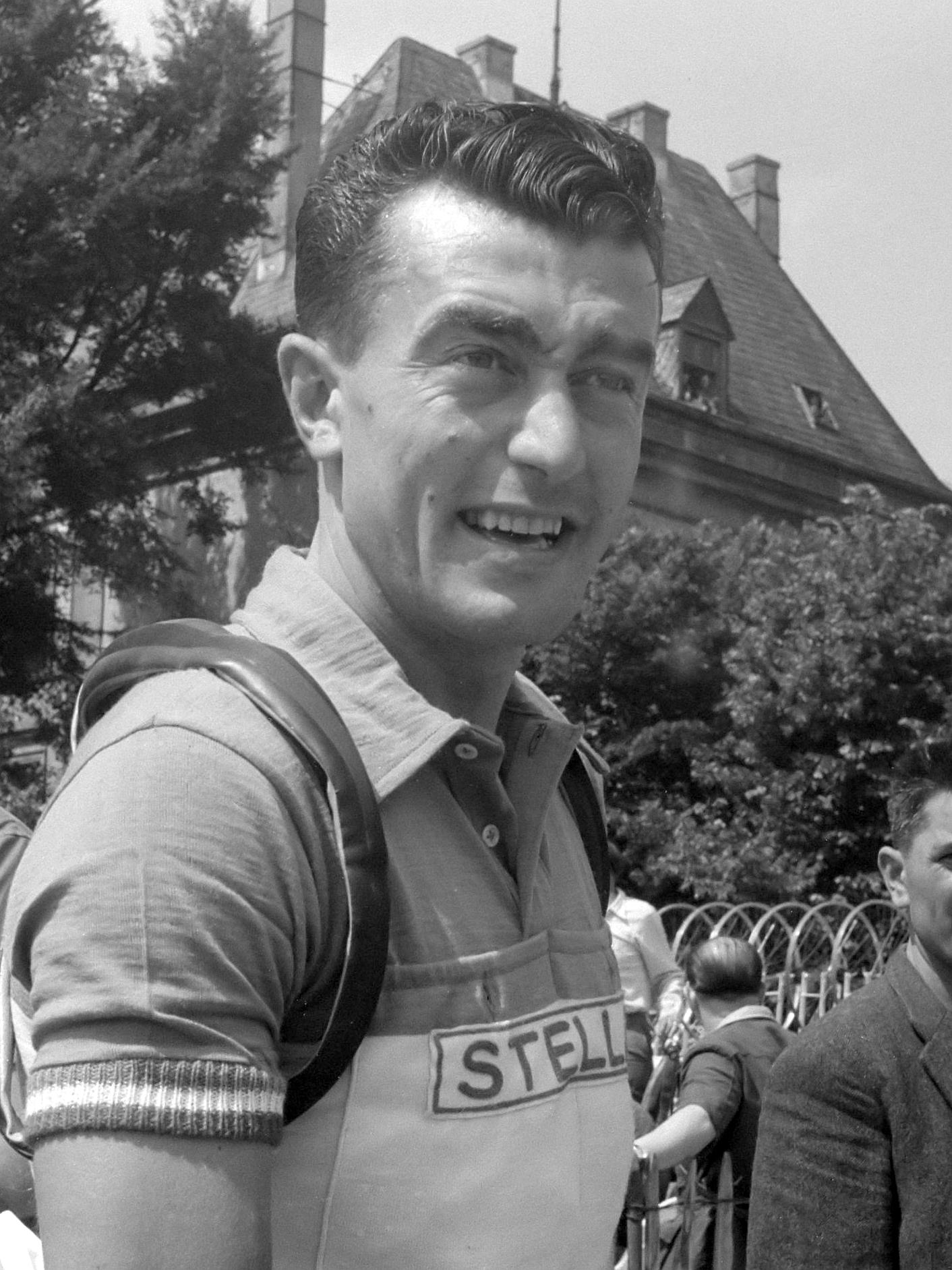
Louison Bobet (pictured in 1951), winner of the general classification

In that stage, Robic had fallen down, and lost many minutes, so he was no longer considered able to win the Tour. He did not start the fourteenth stage. At that point, Bobet was 3 minutes 13 seconds behind Malléjac.

In the eighteenth stage in the alps, Bobet followed Jesús Loroño who attacked on the Col de Vars. Bobet dropped him on the descend, and went alone to the Col d'Izoard. There was a group of early attackers ahead, including Bobet's team-mate Deledda. Deledda waited for Bobet, and helped him to reach the Izoard. Bobet could save his energy, and when they reached the Izoard, he left Deledda behind. The tactics had worked, and Bobet won more than 12 minutes on Malléjac and took the yellow jersey. He extended his lead by winning the time trial in stage 20, thereby showing that he was not only a good climber but also a fine time trialist. At that point, the Dutch team was leading the team classification, and the Dutch and French team started to work together to keep their leading positions in the general and team classification.

For the finish in Paris, eleven former Tour de France winners were present: Maurice Garin (who won the 1903 edition), Gustave Garrigou (1911), Philippe Thys (1913, 1914 and 1920), Lucien Buysse (1926), André Leducq (1930 and 1932), Antonin Magne (1931 and 1934), Georges Speicher (1933), Romain Maes (1935), Sylvère Maes (1936 and 1939), Roger Lapébie (1937) and Ferdinand Kübler (1950).

== Classification leadership and minor prizes ==
The time that each cyclist required to finish each stage was recorded, and these times were added together for the general classification. If a cyclist had received a time bonus, it was subtracted from this total; all time penalties were added to this total. The cyclist with the least accumulated time was the race leader, identified by the yellow jersey. Of the 119 cyclists that started the 1953 Tour de France, 76 finished the race. The results showed that the pre-war greats were no longer dominant: all cyclists in the top ten had turned professional after the Second World War. The prize for best regional cyclist was won by second-placed Malléjac.

Fifty years after the first Tour de France, the 1953 Tour featured the introduction of the green jersey, for the leader in the points classification (usually seen as the "best sprinter's" jersey), at that time called the Grand Prix Cinquentennaire. The classification was based on the points system as it had been used from the 1905 Tour de France to the 1912 Tour de France. The points classification was not only added to celebrate the 50 years since the first race, but also to have the sprinters race hard for the entire race. The calculation method came from the Tours de France from 1905 to 1912. Points were given according to the ranking of the stage: the winner received one point, the next cyclist two points, and so on. These points were added, and the cyclist with the fewest points was the leader of the points classification. In 1953, this was won by Fritz Schär.

Points for the mountains classification were earned by reaching the mountain tops first. The system was almost the same as in 1952: there were two types of mountain tops: the hardest ones, in category 1, gave 10 points to the first cyclist, the easier ones, in category 2, gave 6 points to the first cyclist, and the easiest ones, in category 3, gave 3 points. Jesús Loroño won this classification.

The calculation of the team classification was changed from the calculation in 1952. In 1953, it was calculated as the sum of the daily team classifications, and the daily team classification was calculated by adding the times in the stage result of the best three cyclists per team. It was won by the Dutch team, with a small margin over the French team. South West did not finish with three cyclists so was not eligible for the team classification.

The 1952 Tour had seen the introduction of combativity awards, in which a jury composed of journalists gave points after most stages to the cyclist they considered most combative. In 1953, this system was kept, with the addition of a classification that was led by the rider with the most points from votes in all stages, and an overall super-combativity award. This was won by Wout Wagtmans. The Souvenir Henri Desgrange was given in honour of Tour founder Henri Desgrange to the first rider to pass a point by his final residence, the "Villa Mia" in Beauvallon, Grimaud, on the French Riviera on stage 16. This prize was won by Claude Colette.

Classification leadership by stage
Stage	Winner	General classification	Points classification	Mountains classification (Note: No jersey was awarded to the leader of the mountains classification until a white jersey with red polka dots was introduced in 1975.)	Team classification	Combativity		Bad luck award
Stage	Winner	General classification	Points classification	Mountains classification	Team classification	Award	Classification	Bad luck award
1	Fritz Schär	Fritz Schär	Fritz Schär	no award	Netherlands	Wout Wagtmans	Wout Wagtmans	Antonin Rolland
2	Fritz Schär	Fritz Schär	Fritz Schär	Wout Wagtmans	Netherlands	Wout Wagtmans	Wout Wagtmans	François Mahé
3	Stanislas Bober	Fritz Schär	Fritz Schär	Wout Wagtmans	Netherlands	Stanislas Bober	Wout Wagtmans	Bernard Gauthier
4	Gerrit Voorting	Fritz Schär	Fritz Schär	Wout Wagtmans	Netherlands	Gerrit Voorting	Wout Wagtmans	Jean Forestier
5	Jean Malléjac	Roger Hassenforder	Fritz Schär	Wout Wagtmans	North-East/Centre	Roger Hassenforder	Wout Wagtmans	Claude Rouer
6	Martin Van Geneugden	Roger Hassenforder	Fritz Schär	Wout Wagtmans	North-East/Centre	Louis Caput	Wout Wagtmans	André Darrigade
7	Livio Isotti	Roger Hassenforder	Fritz Schär	Wout Wagtmans	North-East/Centre	François Mahé	Wout Wagtmans	Émile Guérinel
8	Jan Nolten	Roger Hassenforder	Fritz Schär	Wout Wagtmans	North-East/Centre	Jan Nolten	Wout Wagtmans	Antonin Rolland
9	Fiorenzo Magni	Fritz Schär	Fritz Schär	Wout Wagtmans	North-East/Centre	André Darrigade	Wout Wagtmans	Pierre Molinéris
10	Jesús Loroño	Fritz Schär	Jean Robic	Jesús Loroño	North-East/Centre	Jesús Loroño	Wout Wagtmans	Guy Buchaille
11	Jean Robic	Jean Robic	Jean Robic	Jean Robic	North-East/Centre	Jean Robic	Wout Wagtmans	Marcel Huber
12	André Darrigade	François Mahé	Jean Robic	Jean Robic	North-East/Centre	Maurice Quentin	Wout Wagtmans	Jacques Dupont
13	Nello Lauredi	Jean Malléjac	Fritz Schär	Jean Robic	North-East/Centre	Joseph Mirando	Wout Wagtmans	Jean Robic
14	Bernard Quennehen	Jean Malléjac	Fritz Schär	Jesús Loroño	North-East/Centre	Jan Nolten	Jan Nolten	Roger Pontet
15	Maurice Quentin	Jean Malléjac	Fritz Schär	Jesús Loroño	North-East/Centre	Maurice Quentin	Jan Nolten	Maurice Diot
16	Wim van Est	Jean Malléjac	Fritz Schär	Jesús Loroño	North-East/Centre	Joseph Mirando	Jan Nolten	Jesús Loroño
17	Wout Wagtmans	Jean Malléjac	Fritz Schär	Jesús Loroño	North-East/Centre	Stanislas Bober	Wout Wagtmans	François Mahé
18	Louison Bobet	Louison Bobet	Fritz Schär	Jesús Loroño	Netherlands	Louison Bobet	Wout Wagtmans	Gino Bartali
19	Georges Meunier	Louison Bobet	Fritz Schär	Jesús Loroño	Netherlands	Jean Forestier	Wout Wagtmans	Hilaire Couvreur
20	Louison Bobet	Louison Bobet	Fritz Schär	Jesús Loroño	Netherlands	no award	Wout Wagtmans	Alfred Tonello
21	Wout Wagtmans	Louison Bobet	Fritz Schär	Jesús Loroño	Netherlands	Gilbert Bauvin	Wout Wagtmans	Jean Le Guilly
22	Fiorenzo Magni	Louison Bobet	Fritz Schär	Jesús Loroño	Netherlands	Wout Wagtmans	Wout Wagtmans	Maurice Diot
Final		Louison Bobet	Fritz Schär	Jesús Loroño	Netherlands	Wout Wagtmans		Guy Buchaille

== Final standings ==
=== General classification ===
Final general classification (1–10)
Rank	Rider	Team	Time
1	Louison Bobet (FRA)	France	129h 23' 25"
2	Jean Malléjac (FRA)	West	+ 14' 18"
3	Giancarlo Astrua (ITA)	Italy	+ 15' 02"
4	Alex Close (BEL)	Belgium	+ 17' 35"
5	Wout Wagtmans (NED)	Netherlands	+ 18' 05"
6	Fritz Schär (SUI)	Switzerland	+ 18' 44"
7	Antonin Rolland (FRA)	France	+ 23' 03"
8	Nello Lauredi (FRA)	France	+ 26' 03"
9	Raphaël Géminiani (FRA)	France	+ 27' 18"
10	François Mahé (FRA)	West	+ 28' 26"

Final general classification (11–76)
Rank	Rider	Team	Time
11	Gino Bartali (ITA)	Italy	+ 32' 00"
12	Joseph Mirando (FRA)	South-East	+ 38' 21"
13	Wim van Est (NED)	Netherlands	+ 39' 00"
14	José Serra (ESP)	Spain	+ 40' 32"
15	Fiorenzo Magni (ITA)	Italy	+ 40' 47"
16	Gilbert Bauvin (FRA)	North-East/Centre	+ 42' 03"
17	Gerrit Voorting (NED)	Netherlands	+ 44' 02"
18	Marcel Ernzer (LUX)	Luxembourg	+ 46' 41"
19	Jan Nolten (NED)	Netherlands	+ 47' 29"
20	Ugo Anzile (ITA)	Italy	+ 50' 38"
21	Lucien Lazaridès (FRA)	South-East	+ 52' 16"
22	Vincenzo Rossello (ITA)	Italy	+ 54' 47"
23	Raymond Impanis (BEL)	Belgium	+ 59' 12"
24	Andrés Trobat (ESP)	Spain	+ 1h 04' 35"
25	Stanislas Bober (FRA)	Île-de-France	+ 1h 08' 16"
26	Lucien Teisseire (FRA)	France	+ 1h 12' 57"
27	Georges Meunier (FRA)	North-East/Centre	+ 1h 14' 43"
28	Hilaire Couvreur (BEL)	Belgium	+ 1h 16' 04"
29	Thijs Roks (NED)	Netherlands	+ 1h 22' 04"
30	Jean Le Guilly (FRA)	France	+ 1h 22' 15"
31	Maurice Quentin (FRA)	Île-de-France	+ 1h 24' 15"
32	Marcel Huber (SUI)	Switzerland	+ 1h 25' 02"
33	Richard Van Genechten (BEL)	Belgium	+ 1h 29' 39"
34	Martin Van Geneugden (BEL)	Belgium	+ 1h 30' 17"
35	Adolphe Deledda (FRA)	France	+ 1h 37' 24"
36	Hein van Breenen (NED)	Netherlands	+ 1h 37' 41"
37	André Darrigade (FRA)	South West	+ 1h 39' 09"
38	Pierre Molinéris (FRA)	South-East	+ 1h 39' 16"
39	Jean Forestier (FRA)	North-East/Centre	+ 1h 40' 15"
40	Adri Suykerbuyk (NED)	Netherlands	+ 1h 40' 31"
41	Jacques Renaud (FRA)	Île-de-France	+ 1h 40' 42"
42	Livio Isotti (ITA)	Italy	+ 1h 41' 03"
43	René De Smet (BEL)	Belgium	+ 1h 42' 25"
44	Roger Pontet (FRA)	West	+ 1h 43' 43"
45	Jan Adriaensens (BEL)	Belgium	+ 1h 44' 03"
46	Francisco Masip (ESP)	Spain	+ 1h 45' 31"
47	Roger Walkowiak (FRA)	North-East/Centre	+ 1h 52' 53"
48	Antonio Gelabert (ESP)	Spain	+ 1h 52' 56"
49	Alfred Tonello (FRA)	Île-de-France	+ 1h 54' 03"
50	Jesús Loroño (ESP)	Spain	+ 1h 58' 03"
51	Raoul Rémy (FRA)	France	+ 2h 02' 07"
52	Alfred De Bruyne (BEL)	Belgium	+ 2h 02' 46"
53	Mario Baroni (ITA)	Italy	+ 2h 03' 06"
54	Umberto Drei (ITA)	Italy	+ 2h 12' 25"
55	Jean Dacquay (FRA)	North-East/Centre	+ 2h 12' 33"
56	Giovanni Corrieri (ITA)	Italy	+ 2h 14' 05"
57	Remo Pianezzi (SUI)	Switzerland	+ 2h 15' 34"
58	Claude Colette (FRA)	South West	+ 2h 16' 18"
59	Vincent Vitetta (FRA)	South-East	+ 2h 20' 00"
60	Maurice Diot (FRA)	Île-de-France	+ 2h 24' 09"
61	Carlo Lafranchi (SUI)	Switzerland	+ 2h 26' 48"
62	Joseph Morvan (FRA)	Switzerland	+ 2h 31' 09"
63	René Rotta (FRA)	South-East	+ 2h 31' 24"
64	Bernard Quennehen (FRA)	North-East/Centre	+ 2h 31' 57"
65	Amand Audaire (FRA)	West	+ 2h 31' 59"
66	Willy Kemp (LUX)	Luxembourg	+ 2h 42' 49"
67	Max Schellenberg (SUI)	Switzerland	+ 2h 43' 32"
68	Martin Metzger (SUI)	Switzerland	+ 2h 55' 58"
69	Siro Bianchi (FRA)	South-East	+ 2h 58' 33"
70	Bernard Bultel (FRA)	West	+ 3h 26' 06"
71	Norbert Esnault (FRA)	West	+ 3h 31' 21"
72	Jean Schmit (LUX)	Luxembourg	+ 3h 34' 58"
73	Dalmacio Langarica (ESP)	Spain	+ 3h 39' 59"
74	José Vidal Porcar (ESP)	Spain	+ 3h 48' 11"
75	Bernard Gauthier (FRA)	France	+ 3h 49' 49"
76	Claude Rouer (FRA)	Île-de-France	+ 4h 09' 10"

=== Points classification ===
Final points classification (1–10)
Rank	Rider	Team	Points
1	Fritz Schär (SUI)	Switzerland	271
2	Fiorenzo Magni (ITA)	Italy	307
3	Raphaël Géminiani (FRA)	France	406.5
4	Antonin Rolland (FRA)	France	413
5	Wim van Est (NED)	Netherlands	440
6	Gerrit Voorting (NED)	Netherlands	490
7	Louison Bobet (FRA)	France	541
8	Giancarlo Astrua (ITA)	Italy	546
9	Gino Bartali (ITA)	Italy	552
10	Raymond Impanis (BEL)	Belgium	620

=== Mountains classification ===
Final mountains classification (1–10)
Rank	Rider	Team	Points
1	Jesús Loroño (ESP)	Spain	54
2	Louison Bobet (FRA)	France	36
3	Joseph Mirando (FRA)	South-East	30
4	Gilbert Bauvin (FRA)	North-East/Centre	25
5	Jean Le Guilly (FRA)	France	24
6	Fritz Schär (SUI)	Switzerland	22
7	Giancarlo Astrua (ITA)	Italy	20
8	José Serra (ESP)	Spain	19
9	Jan Nolten (NED)	Netherlands	14
9	Marcel Huber (SUI)	Switzerland	14

=== Team classification ===
Final team classification
Rank	Team	Time
1	Netherlands	387h 42' 54"
2	France	+ 11' 07"
3	North-East/Centre	+ 23' 22"
4	Belgium	+ 54' 57"
5	West	+ 1h 07' 51"
6	Italy	+ 1h 19' 45"
7	Spain	+ 2h 00' 13"
8	South-East	+ 2h 28' 45"
9	Île-de-France	+ 2h 38' 25"
10	Switzerland	+ 2h 42' 22"
11	Luxembourg	+ 4h 34' 52"

== Aftermath ==
The 1953 Tour de France had two young rider making their debuts, Charly Gaul and André Darrigade. Gaul would later win the 1958 Tour de France, and Darrigade would win 22 stages in total, and win the points classification twice.

It was the last Tour that Gino Bartali rode. Bartali started eight Tours, and won two of them.

The winner of the 1953 Tour, Bobet, would also win the next two editions, and became the first rider to win three consecutive Tours.

== Bibliography ==
- Amels, Wim (1984). De geschiedenis van de Tour de France 1903–1984 (in Dutch). Valkenswaard, Netherlands: Sport-Express. ISBN 978-90-70763-05-3.
- Augendre, Jacques (2016). Guide historique [Historical guide] (PDF) (in French). Paris: Amaury Sport Organisation. Archived (PDF) from the original on 17 August 2016.
- McGann, Bill; McGann, Carol (2006). The Story of the Tour de France: 1903–1964. Vol. 1. Indianapolis: Dog Ear Publishing. ISBN 978-1-59858-180-5.
- Nauright, John; Parrish, Charles (2012). Sports Around the World: History, Culture, and Practice. Vol. 2. Santa Barbara, California: ABC–CLIO. ISBN 978-1-59884-300-2.
- Seray, Jacques [in French]; Lablaine, Jacques (2006). Henri Desgrange, l'homme qui créa le Tour de France [Henri Desgrange, the man who created the Tour de France] (in French). Saint-Malo, France: Editions Cristel. ISBN 978-2-84421-042-5.
- Thompson, Christopher S. (2006). The Tour de France: A Cultural History. University of California Press. ISBN 0-520-24760-4.
- van den Akker, Pieter (2018). Tour de France Rules and Statistics: 1903–2018. Self-published. ISBN 978-1-79398-080-9.
