= Guy Buchaille =

French cyclist

Personal information
- Born: 20 August 1932 Mâcon, Saône-et-Loire, France
- Died: 28 February 2025 (aged 92) La Chapelle-de-Guinchay, Saône-et-Loire, France

Cycling career
- Sport: Cycling
- Role: Rider

Guy Buchaille (20 August 1932 – 28 February 2025) was a French racing cyclist. He was a professional rider from 1952 to 1958. He rode in the 1953 Tour de France.
