= Points classification in the Tour de France =

Green jersey
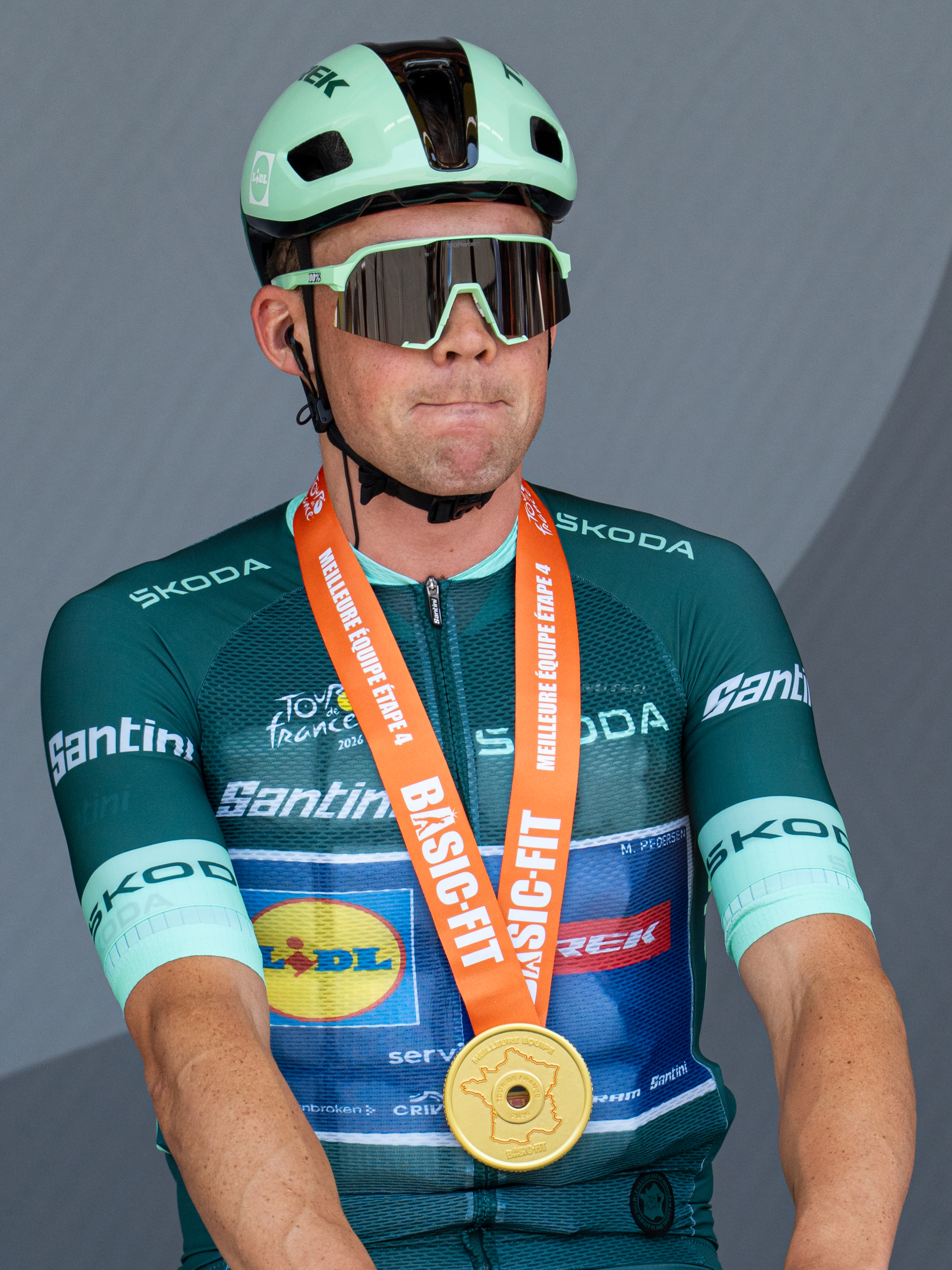
- Mads Pedersen wearing the green jersey during presentation ceremony for the 2026 Tour de France
- Sport: Road bicycle racing
- Competition: Tour de France
- Awarded for: Best sprinter
- Local name: Maillot vert (French)

History
- First award: 1953
- Editions: 74 (as of 2026)
- First winner: Fritz Schär (SUI)
- Most wins: Peter Sagan (SVK) 7 wins
- Most recent: Mads Pedersen (DEN)

The points classification (French: classement par points) is a secondary competition in the Tour de France, which started in 1953. Points are given for high finishes in a stage and for winning intermediate sprints, and these are recorded in a points classification. It is considered a sprinters' competition. The leader is indicated by a green jersey (French: maillot vert), which has become a metonym for the points classification competition.

The system has inspired many other cycling races; the other two Grand Tours have also installed points classifications: the Vuelta a España since 1955, also using a green jersey, and the Giro d'Italia since 1966, currently using a mauve jersey. Peter Sagan is the most successful cyclist in the history of the points classification competition with seven green jerseys.

== History ==
After scandals in the 1904 Tour de France, the rules of the 1905 Tour de France were changed: the winner was no longer determined by the time system, but with the points system. The cyclists received points, equal to their ranking in the stage, and the cyclist with the fewest points was the leader of the race. After the 1912 Tour de France, the system was changed back to the time system that is still in use.

In the 1953 Tour de France, to celebrate the 50th birthday of the Tour de France, the points system was reintroduced, but this time as an additional classification. Because the leader in the general classification wears a yellow jersey, the leader in the points classification also received a special jersey, a green jersey. The color green was chosen to reflect the brand color of its sponsor, much as the yellow jersey was chosen to mirror the colour of the sponsoring newspaper from which it arose.

In the first years, the cyclist only received penalty points for not finishing with a high place, so the cyclist with the fewest points was awarded the green jersey. From 1959 on, the system was changed so the cyclists were awarded points for high place finishes (with first place getting the most points, and lower placings getting successively fewer points), so the cyclist with the most points was awarded the green jersey.

1968 is the only year the jersey was not green: for that edition of the race, the jersey was red to match a new sponsor.

Whereas the yellow jersey is awarded for the lowest cumulative time in the race, the green jersey reflects points gained for high placings on each stage and intermediate "hot spots", especially during the flat stages of the Tour. The intermediate sprints were formerly for the intermediate sprints classification, with the points for the points classification a 'side-effect'; however, the intermediate sprints classification was later scrapped, but the intermediate sprints remained part of the points classification.

The points classification is widely thought of as the "sprinter's competition", since the most points are scored in flat stages, in which the riders generally remain together in one large peloton, leaving the best sprinters at the end to fight for the stage win. However, to win the competition a rider will need a reasonable level of all-round skills as well as strong sprinting, since he will need to finish within the time limit on mountain stages to remain in contention, and ideally will be able to contest intermediate sprints during mountain stages as well. For example, Mario Cipollini was one of the best pure sprinters of his era but was never in contention for the points classification because he was unwilling to make it through the mountain stages and finish the race (however, he did finish the Giro d'Italia and won its points classification several times).

On four occasions, the winner of the points classification was also the winner of the general classification: three times by Eddy Merckx, and once by Bernard Hinault. In 1969, Eddy Merckx won the general classification, the points classification and the mountains classification (the polka dot jersey was born in 1975), a unique performance in the Tour de France, but as he was leading the race, he could not conceivably wear all jerseys, so while he wore the yellow jersey, the green jersey was worn by the person who was second in the points classification standings.

Peter Sagan set the record for the most stages in the lead of a Tour de France classification, wearing the green jersey for 100 days through stage 18 of the 2018 Tour de France.

Two winners of the points classification, Sean Kelly and Sam Bennett both hail from the town of Carrick-on-Suir, Ireland, a town with a population of only 5,771 residents.

=== Sponsorship ===
The jersey gained its green colour from its first sponsor, La Belle Jardinière, a French clothing store. The jersey was sponsored by French betting company Pari Mutuel Urbain (PMU) for nearly 25 years, with Czech car manufacturer Škoda becoming the current sponsor in 2015.

=== Jerseys ranking ===
The green jersey is the second most important jersey in the Tour de France, after the yellow jersey. If a rider is the leader in the general and points classifications he will wear the yellow jersey. The second rider in the points classification will wear the green jersey with some exceptions:

- if the second rider leads another classification, he will wear the leader jersey (for example, if rider A is first in both the general classification and the points classification, and rider B is second in the points classification and first in the young rider classification, rider A will wear the yellow jersey and rider B will wear the white jersey);
- if the second rider is world champion he will wear the rainbow jersey, and if the rider is a continental champion or national champion he will wear the corresponding jersey.

In both cases, the third rider (or the following eligible rider) will wear the green jersey.

== Points system ==
=== Current ===
As of 2026, the points classification is calculated by adding up the points collected in the stage and subtracting penalty points. Points are awarded for the first cyclists to cross the finish line or the intermediate sprint line, and for the cyclists with the fastest times in the prologue or individual time trials, under the following scheme:

Type	1st	2nd	3rd	4th	5th	6th	7th	8th	9th	10th	11th	12th	13th	14th	15th
Flat stage finish	70	50	40	35	30	26	24	22	20	18	16	14	12	10	8
Hilly stage finish	50	30	20	18	16	14	12	10	8	7	6	5	4	3	2
Medium mountain stage finish	30	25	22	19	17	15	13	11	9	7	6	5	4	3	2
High mountain stage finish	20	17	15	13	11	10	9	8	7	6	5	4	3	2	1
Individual time trial	20	17	15	13	11	10	9	8	7	6	5	4	3	2	1
Intermediate sprint	25	20	16	14	12	10	9	8	7	6	5	4	3	2	1

Riders can lose points for various infractions of the rules, which means some riders finish the Tour with a negative points tally.

Before the start of the Tour de France, the organization declares which stages are considered flat, hilly, medium mountain, or high mountain. Flat stages are stages that are expected to finish in a bunch sprint. Hilly stages may have small categorized climbs (3rd or 4th category) close enough to the finish to prevent most sprint specialists from winning. Medium mountain stages have numerous climbs, typically 2nd and 3rd category. High mountain stages have numerous large climbs, often 1st category or hors catégorie.

When the order in which cyclists crossed the line cannot be determined or when cyclists score exactly the same time in the prologue/individual time trial, the cyclists divide the points (rounded up to the nearest 1/2 point). A cyclist that does not finish a stage is removed from the points classification. After every stage, the leader in the points classification is given a green jersey. In the event of a tie in the ranking, the cyclist with the most stage victories is the leader. If that is also a tie, the number of intermediate sprint victories indicates the leader. If that is also a tie, the general classification determines the leader. At the end of the Tour de France, the cyclist leading the points classification is the winner of the green jersey.

=== Historical ===
The rules have varied over the years. When the system started in 1953, the ranks of each cyclist in a stage were added, and the cyclist with the lowest number of points won. Later, points were given to the first few cyclists in each stage. Even later, the point system started to differentiate for stage type, typically assigning more points to flat stages. Intermediate sprints were also given points.

In 2009, the system had evolved to the following, with either two or three intermediate sprints per stage:

Points classification in 2009
Type	1st	2nd	3rd	4th	5th	6th	7th	8th	9th	10th	11th	12th	13th	14th	15th	16th	17th	18th	19th	20th	21st	22nd	23rd	24th	25th
"flat" stage finish	35	30	26	24	22	20	19	18	17	16	15	14	13	12	11	10	9	8	7	6	5	4	3	2	1
"medium mountain" stage finish	25	22	20	18	16	15	14	13	12	11	10	9	8	7	6	5	4	3	2	1					
"high mountain" stage finish	20	17	15	13	12	10	9	8	7	6	5	4	3	2	1										
prologue/individual time trial	15	12	10	8	6	5	4	3	2	1															
intermediate sprint	6	4	2																						

Starting from the 2011 Tour de France, a system very similar to the current one was used:

Points classification in 2011
Type	1st	2nd	3rd	4th	5th	6th	7th	8th	9th	10th	11th	12th	13th	14th	15th
"flat" stage finish	45	35	30	26	22	20	18	16	14	12	10	8	6	4	2
"hilly finish/medium mountain" stage finish	30	25	22	19	17	15	13	11	9	7	6	5	4	3	2
"high mountain" stage finish	20	17	15	13	11	10	9	8	7	6	5	4	3	2	1
individual time trial	20	17	15	13	11	10	9	8	7	6	5	4	3	2	1
intermediate sprint	20	17	15	13	11	10	9	8	7	6	5	4	3	2	1

== Winners ==
Year	Winner	Points	Second place	Points	Third place	Points
1953	Fritz Schär (SUI)	271	Fiorenzo Magni (ITA)	307	Raphaël Géminiani (FRA)	406
1954	Ferdinand Kübler (SUI)	215.5	Stan Ockers (BEL)	284.5	Fritz Schär (SUI)	286.5
1955	Stan Ockers (BEL)	322	Wout Wagtmans (NED)	399	Miguel Poblet (ESP)	409
1956	Stan Ockers (BEL)	280	Fernand Picot (FRA)	464	Gerrit Voorting (NED)	465
1957	Jean Forestier (FRA)	301	Wim van Est (NED)	317	Adolf Christian (SUI)	366
1958	Jean Graczyk (FRA)	347	Joseph Planckaert (BEL)	406	André Darrigade (FRA)	553
1959	André Darrigade (FRA)	613	Gérard Saint (FRA)	524	Jacques Anquetil (FRA)	503
1960	Jean Graczyk (FRA)	74	Graziano Battistini (ITA)	40	Federico Bahamontes (ESP)	35
1961	André Darrigade (FRA)	174	Jean Gainche (FRA)	169	Guido Carlesi (ITA)	148
1962	Rudi Altig (FRG)	173	Emile Daems (BEL)	144	Jean Graczyk (FRA)	140
1963	Rik Van Looy (BEL)	275	Jacques Anquetil (FRA)	138	Federico Bahamontes (ESP)	123
1964	Jan Janssen (NED)	208	Edward Sels (BEL)	199	Rudi Altig (FRG)	165
1965	Jan Janssen (NED)	144	Guido Reybrouck (BEL)	130	Felice Gimondi (ITA)	124
1966	Willy Planckaert (BEL)	211	Gerben Karstens (NED)	189	Edward Sels (BEL)	178
1967	Jan Janssen (NED)	154	Guido Reybrouck (BEL)	119	Georges Vandenberghe (BEL)	111
1968	Franco Bitossi (ITA)	241	Walter Godefroot (BEL)	219	Jan Janssen (NED)	200
1969	Eddy Merckx (BEL)	244	Jan Janssen (NED)	149	Marinus Wagtmans (NED)	136
1970	Walter Godefroot (BEL)	212	Eddy Merckx (BEL)	207	Marino Basso (ITA)	161
1971	Eddy Merckx (BEL)	202	Cyrille Guimard (FRA)	186	Gerben Karstens (NED)	107
1972	Eddy Merckx (BEL)	196	Rik Van Linden (BEL)	135	Joop Zoetemelk (NED)	132
1973	Herman Van Springel (BEL)	187	Joop Zoetemelk (NED)	168	Luis Ocaña (ESP)	145
1974	Patrick Sercu (BEL)	283	Eddy Merckx (BEL)	270	Barry Hoban (GBR)	170
1975	Rik Van Linden (BEL)	342	Eddy Merckx (BEL)	240	Francesco Moser (ITA)	199
1976	Freddy Maertens (BEL)	293	Pierino Gavazzi (ITA)	140	Jacques Esclassan (FRA)	128
1977	Jacques Esclassan (FRA)	236	Giacinto Santambrogio (ITA)	140	Dietrich Thurau (FRG)	137
1978	Freddy Maertens (BEL)	242	Jacques Esclassan (FRA)	189	Bernard Hinault (FRA)	123
1979	Bernard Hinault (FRA)	253	Dietrich Thurau (FRG)	157	Joop Zoetemelk (NED)	109
1980	Rudy Pevenage (BEL)	194	Sean Kelly (IRL)	153	Ludo Peeters (BEL)	148
1981	Freddy Maertens (BEL)	428	William Tackaert (BEL)	222	Bernard Hinault (FRA)	184
1982	Sean Kelly (IRL)	429	Bernard Hinault (FRA)	152	Phil Anderson (AUS)	149
1983	Sean Kelly (IRL)	360	Frits Pirard (NED)	144	Laurent Fignon (FRA)	126
1984	Frank Hoste (BEL)	322	Sean Kelly (IRL)	318	Eric Vanderaerden (BEL)	247
1985	Sean Kelly (IRL)	434	Greg LeMond (USA)	332	Stephen Roche (IRL)	279
1986	Eric Vanderaerden (BEL)	277	Jozef Lieckens (BEL)	232	Bernard Hinault (FRA)	210
1987	Jean-Paul van Poppel (NED)	263	Stephen Roche (IRL)	247	Pedro Delgado (ESP)	228
1988	Eddy Planckaert (BEL)	278	Davis Phinney (USA)	193	Sean Kelly (IRL)	183
1989	Sean Kelly (IRL)	277	Etienne De Wilde (BEL)	194	Steven Rooks (NED)	163
1990	Olaf Ludwig (GDR)	256	Johan Museeuw (BEL)	221	Erik Breukink (NED)	118
1991	Djamolidine Abdoujaparov (URS)	316	Laurent Jalabert (FRA)	263	Olaf Ludwig (GER)	175
1992	Laurent Jalabert (FRA)	293	Johan Museeuw (BEL)	262	Claudio Chiappucci (ITA)	202
1993	Djamolidine Abdoujaparov (UZB)	298	Johan Museeuw (BEL)	157	Maximillian Sciandri (ITA)	153
1994	Djamolidine Abdoujaparov (UZB)	322	Silvio Martinello (ITA)	273	Ján Svorada (SVK)	230
1995	Laurent Jalabert (FRA)	333	Djamolidine Abdoujaparov (UZB)	271	Miguel Induráin (ESP)	180
1996	Erik Zabel (GER)	335	Frédéric Moncassin (FRA)	284	Fabio Baldato (ITA)	255
1997	Erik Zabel (GER)	350	Frédéric Moncassin (FRA)	223	Mario Traversoni (ITA)	198
1998	Erik Zabel (GER)	327	Stuart O'Grady (AUS)	230	Tom Steels (BEL)	221
1999	Erik Zabel (GER)	323	Stuart O'Grady (AUS)	275	Christophe Capelle (FRA)	196
2000	Erik Zabel (GER)	321	Robbie McEwen (AUS)	203	Romans Vainšteins (LAT)	184
2001	Erik Zabel (GER)	252	Stuart O'Grady (AUS)	244	Damien Nazon (FRA)	169
2002	Robbie McEwen (AUS)	280	Erik Zabel (GER)	261	Stuart O'Grady (AUS)	208
2003	Baden Cooke (AUS)	216	Robbie McEwen (AUS)	214	Erik Zabel (GER)	188
2004	Robbie McEwen (AUS)	272	Thor Hushovd (NOR)	247	Erik Zabel (GER)	245
2005	Thor Hushovd (NOR)	194	Stuart O'Grady (AUS)	182	Robbie McEwen (AUS)	178
2006	Robbie McEwen (AUS)	288	Erik Zabel (GER)	199	Thor Hushovd (NOR)	195
2007	Tom Boonen (BEL)	256	Robert Hunter (RSA)	234	Erik Zabel (GER)	232
2008	Óscar Freire (ESP)	270	Thor Hushovd (NOR)	220	Erik Zabel (GER)	217
2009	Thor Hushovd (NOR)	280	Mark Cavendish (GBR)	270	Gerald Ciolek (GER)	172
2010	Alessandro Petacchi (ITA)	243	Mark Cavendish (GBR)	232	Thor Hushovd (NOR)	222
2011	Mark Cavendish (GBR)	334	José Joaquín Rojas (ESP)	272	Philippe Gilbert (BEL)	236
2012	Peter Sagan (SVK)	421	André Greipel (GER)	280	Matthew Goss (AUS)	260
2013	Peter Sagan (SVK)	409	Mark Cavendish (GBR)	312	André Greipel (GER)	267
2014	Peter Sagan (SVK)	431	Alexander Kristoff (NOR)	282	Bryan Coquard (FRA)	271
2015	Peter Sagan (SVK)	432	André Greipel (GER)	366	John Degenkolb (GER)	298
2016	Peter Sagan (SVK)	470	Marcel Kittel (GER)	228	Michael Matthews (AUS)	199
2017	Michael Matthews (AUS)	370	André Greipel (GER)	234	Edvald Boasson Hagen (NOR)	220
2018	Peter Sagan (SVK)	477	Alexander Kristoff (NOR)	246	Arnaud Démare (FRA)	203
2019	Peter Sagan (SVK)	316	Caleb Ewan (AUS)	248	Elia Viviani (ITA)	224
2020	Sam Bennett (IRL)	380	Peter Sagan (SVK)	284	Matteo Trentin (ITA)	260
2021	Mark Cavendish (GBR)	337	Michael Matthews (AUS)	291	Sonny Colbrelli (ITA)	227
2022	Wout van Aert (BEL)	480	Jasper Philipsen (BEL)	286	Tadej Pogačar (SLO)	250
2023	Jasper Philipsen (BEL)	377	Mads Pedersen (DEN)	258	Bryan Coquard (FRA)	203
2024	Biniam Girmay (ERI)	387	Jasper Philipsen (BEL)	354	Bryan Coquard (FRA)	208
2025	Jonathan Milan (ITA)	372	Tadej Pogačar (SLO)	294	Biniam Girmay (ERI)	232
2026	Mads Pedersen (DEN)	559	Jasper Philipsen (BEL)	475	Biniam Girmay (ERI)	367

=== Repeat winners ===
Peter Sagan is the most successful cyclist in the history of the points classification competition with seven green jerseys. Erik Zabel has the most podium finishes, with 12 (6 wins, 2 seconds and 4 thirds). Mark Cavendish has the largest gap between wins; 10 years separating his first and second green jerseys.

Wins	Name	Years
7	Peter Sagan (SVK)	2012, 2013, 2014, 2015, 2016, 2018, 2019
6	Erik Zabel (GER)	1996, 1997, 1998, 1999, 2000, 2001
4	Sean Kelly (IRL)	1982, 1983, 1985, 1989
3	Jan Janssen (NED)	1964, 1965, 1967
3	Eddy Merckx (BEL)	1969, 1971, 1972
3	Freddy Maertens (BEL)	1976, 1978, 1981
3	Djamolidine Abdoujaparov (UZB)	1991, 1993, 1994
3	Robbie McEwen (AUS)	2002, 2004, 2006
2	Stan Ockers (BEL)	1955, 1956
2	Jean Graczyk (FRA)	1958, 1960
2	André Darrigade (FRA)	1959, 1961
2	Laurent Jalabert (FRA)	1992, 1995
2	Thor Hushovd (NOR)	2005, 2009
2	Mark Cavendish (GBR)	2011, 2021

=== By nationality ===
Wins	Country	Years
21	Belgium	1955, 1956, 1963, 1966, 1969, 1970, 1971, 1972, 1973, 1974, 1975, 1976, 1978, 1980, 1981, 1984, 1986, 1988, 2007, 2022, 2023
9	France	1957, 1958, 1959, 1960, 1961, 1977, 1979, 1992, 1995
8	Germany (Note: Besides Erik Zabel's 6 consecutive wins for a united Germany from 1996 to 2001 (following the reunification of Germany in 1990), the 8 wins for Germany also include Rudi Altig's win for West Germany in 1962, and Olaf Ludwig's win for East Germany in 1990 (shortly before German reunification on October 3).)	1962, 1990, 1996, 1997, 1998, 1999, 2000, 2001
7	Slovakia	2012, 2013, 2014, 2015, 2016, 2018, 2019
5	Australia	2002, 2003, 2004, 2006, 2017
5	Ireland	1982, 1983, 1985, 1989, 2020
4	Netherlands	1964, 1965, 1967, 1987
3	Italy	1968, 2010, 2025
2	Switzerland	1953, 1954
2	Uzbekistan (Note: Djamolidine Abdoujaparov won for the Soviet Union in 1991, and for Uzbekistan in 1993 and 1994 (after the dissolution of the Soviet Union at the end of 1991).)	1993, 1994
2	Norway	2005, 2009
2	United Kingdom	2011, 2021
1	Soviet Union	1991
1	Spain	2008
1	Eritrea	2024
1	Denmark	2026

=== Days in green jersey ===
after the end of 2026 Tour de France

Rider	Days	Stages
Peter Sagan (SVK)	130	130
Erik Zabel (GER)	88	89
Freddy Maertens (BEL)	65	70
Sean Kelly (IRL)	65	67
Djamolidine Abdoujaparov (UZB)	54	54
Robbie McEwen (AUS)	51	51
André Darrigade (FRA)	48	51
Mark Cavendish (GBR)	43	43
Jean Graczyk (FRA)	40	40
Thor Hushovd (NOR)	37	37
Eric Vanderaerden (BEL)	35	36
Jan Janssen (NED)	34	39
Eddy Merckx (BEL)	30	35
Tom Boonen (BEL)	29	29
Bernard Hinault (FRA)	28	28
Walter Godefroot (BEL)	27	33
Rik Van Linden (BEL)	27	29
Cyrille Guimard (FRA)	25	28
Rudi Altig (GER)	25	25
Laurent Jalabert (FRA)	25	25

==== Riders leading all stages of an edition ====
- (France) André Darrigade 1959 (22 stages)
- (Belgium) Freddy Maertens 1976 (27 stages)

Some riders wore the jersey in some stages as second in points classification (because the leader wore yellow jersey) and led all other stages:

- (Belgium) Freddy Maertens 1978
- (Belgium) Eric Vanderaerden 1986
- (Slovakia) Peter Sagan 2019
- (Belgium) Wout Van Aert 2022

Sagan would have done the same in 2014 and in 2018 but in the first case he wore the white jersey as leader of that classification and in the second case he wore the rainbow jersey.
