= Bernard Bultel =

French cyclist

Personal information
- Born: 13 November 1930
- Died: 30 November 2009 (aged 79)

Cycling career
- Sport: Cycling
- Role: Rider

Bernard Bultel (13 November 1930 – 30 November 2009) was a French racing cyclist. He rode in the 1953 Tour de France.
