= Wim van Est =

Dutch racing cyclist (1923–2003)

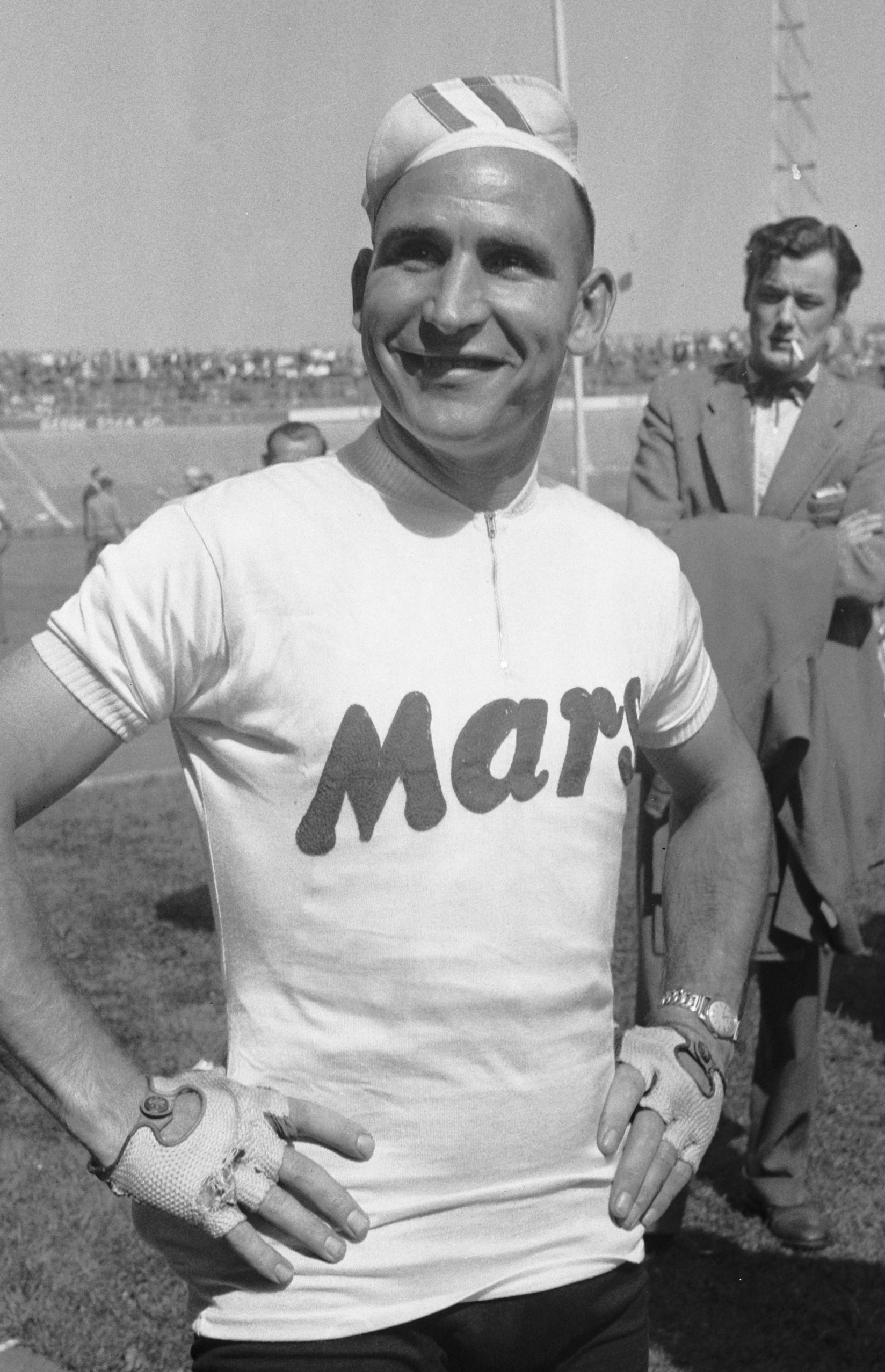
- Van Est in 1956

Personal information
- Full name: Willem van Est
- Nicknames: The Executioner, Iron William, The Locomotive
- Born: 25 March 1923 Fijnaart, Netherlands
- Died: 1 May 2003 (aged 80) Sint Willebrord, Netherlands

Cycling career
- Sport: Cycling
- Discipline: Road
- Role: Rider

Major wins
- Grand Tours: Tour de France; 3 Individual Stages; 1 Team Time Trial; Giro d'Italia; 1 Individual Stage; Stage Races: Ronde van Nederland (1952, 1954); Single-Day Races and Classics: Dutch Road Race Champion ::(1956, 1957); Dutch Individual Pursuit Champion; (1949, 1952, 1953, 1955); Tour of Flanders (1953); Bordeaux–Paris (1950, 1952, 1961)
Medal record
Representing Netherlands
Men's track cycling
World Championships
Bronze medal – third place	1949 Copenhagen	Individual pursuit
Silver medal – second place	1950 Rocourt	Individual pursuit
Bronze medal – third place	1955 Milan	Individual pursuit

Willem "Wim" van Est (25 March 1923 – 1 May 2003) was a Dutch racing cyclist. He is best known for being the first Dutch cyclist to wear the yellow jersey as leader of the general classification in the Tour de France of 1951, and for falling into a ravine while wearing it.

== Biography ==
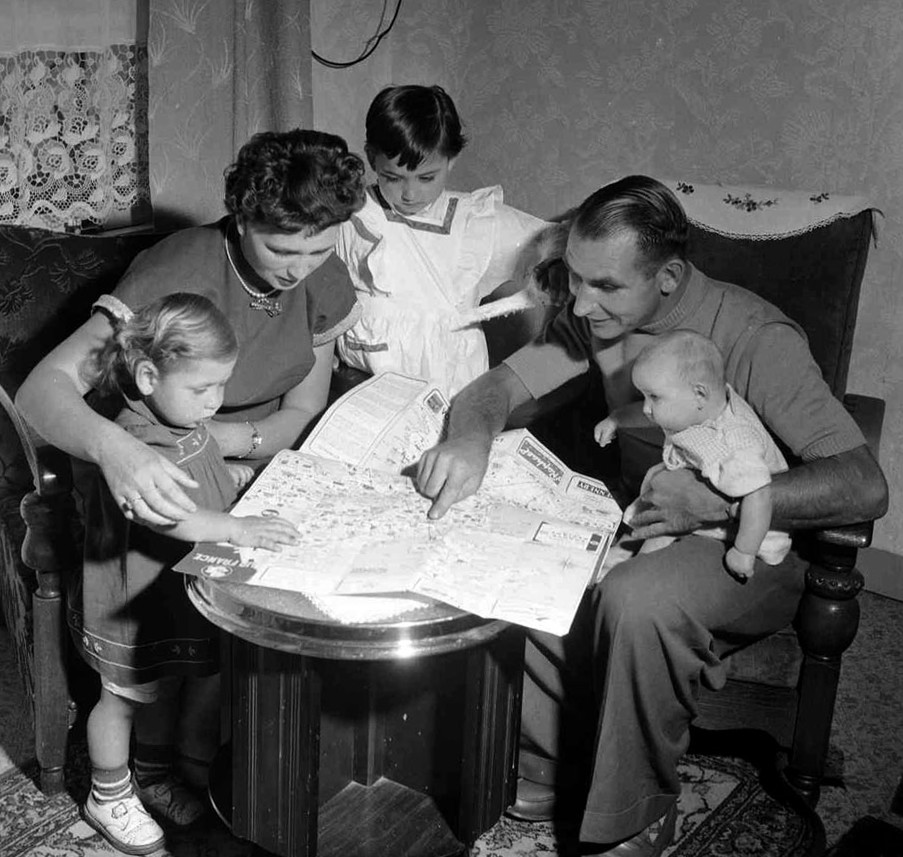
Wim van Est with wife and children in 1954

Van Est was born on 25 March 1923 in the town of Fijnaart, in North Brabant, the 2nd child in a family of 16 children. His family was pushed into poverty in the aftermath of World War One and growing up he lived on a makeshift farm. During this time one of his brothers died at a very young age and his father had to make a coffin for the child, and ride several miles on his bike while carrying the coffin with his son inside to the local church to give the child a proper burial.

During World War 2 the teenage Van Est began riding a considerable distance into Belgium smuggling tobacco and cheese which he would either sell or trade for soap, which he would return home with in order to sell on the Black Market. He was caught doing this during the war and had to serve six months in prison. After this, while the Nazi's occupied his homeland, the teenage Van Est got the idea cycling for sport. When the war was over and races began again he saw a local race and thought he could beat everyone, but it would take him five years to reach the pro level.

He started his cycling career (as an amateur) in 1946, after a professional runner had seen him race in a local competition as part of a wager. His first major victory came in 1950, when he won the 600 km Bordeaux–Paris race.

In 1951, Van Est was part of the Dutch team for the Tour de France. This would be the first time in his entire life he had ever seen mountains of this caliber, let alone tried riding up or descending one. In the 12th stage, from Agen to Dax, he escaped with a small group. He won the stage and gained 19 minutes on the leader, enough to move up to first place in the general classification. As the first Dutchman to wear the accompanying yellow jersey he was praised by the public and media at home.

The next day, in defence of his position, Van Est was chasing the leaders on the descent of the Col d'Aubisque. He was following Fiorenzo Magni on the descent, a very strong rider who had already won two Giro's as well as two Tour Stages, who had superior descending skill. Due to a flat tyre (according to Van Est himself), in conjunction with snow melt and many loose stones on the road he lost control of his bike and went over the cliff. He instinctively kicked his bike away as he fell and of the riders, officials and fans, Belgian rider Roger Decock was the only person to see him go over the ravine.

The ravine was approximately 1,000 feet or 300 meters deep, and much of it was steep enough that a falling person would continue falling all the way to the bottom. Van Est fell about 200 feet or 70 meters trying to grab at the saplings growing on the mountainside to break his fall. Fortunately he slowed and was able to grab hold of a small tree nearby a one meter wide outcrop, which he then made his way to. Even if he wanted to he could not climb back up or down, despite the fact he did not suffer any major injury.

As Van Est precariously sat overlooking a several hundred foot drop he began screaming for help. Fortunately Decock stopped when Van Est went over, giving up his 5th place in the overall standings dropping to 17th by the end of the Tour as a result of the 25 minutes he lost assisting the Dutchman. When the Dutch team car arrived and were told what happened they screamed down the mountain for him for several minutes hearing nothing but echoes. After a few minutes they were able to find his approximate location. It took the team quite some time to tie together every single tire tube they had in order to make a rope that they hoped would reach him. After a great deal of time their 75 meter "rope" reached Van Est and he was able to use the tires to rig together a hoist which he put around his chest under both arms.

Helped by spectators and his manager, he managed to get back to the road. Van Est wanted to continue, but was persuaded to go to the hospital because he had just crashed down a 200 foot ravine.

At home, Van Est's fame grew even more when Belgian watchmaker Pontiac, which had supplied watches to the Dutch team in the Tour de France, started an advertising campaign "Seventy meters deep I dropped, my heart stood still but my Pontiac never stopped".

Later in his career, Van Est twice won the Ronde van Nederland, wore the yellow jersey again in 1955 and 1958, placed 8th in 1957 and won two more stages. Also, he won Bordeaux–Paris two more times, two national road titles, four national titles in the individual pursuit on the track, as well as three medals in the pursuit at the World Championships.

Nevertheless, he remained most famous for the two days in the 1951 Tour de France. To remember this event, a monument was placed on the mountain 50 years after the event, on 17 July 2001.

Wim van Est died in his hometown Sint Willebrord on 1 May 2003. His brothers Kees, Toon, Leen and Nico were also professional cyclists. His brother Piet was also a pro cyclist who rode in several Tours and won a stage in the 1961 Giro.

== Major results ==
- 1947
  - 1st Saarland Rundfahrt
- 1949
  - 1st Dutch Individual Pursuit Champion
  - 1st Stage 5 Ronde van Nederland
  - 3rd World Individual Pursuit Championships
- 1950
  - 1st Bordeaux–Paris
  - 2nd World Individual Pursuit Championships
- 1951
  - 1st Stage 12 Tour de France
  - 2nd Bordeaux–Paris
- 1952
  - 1st Dutch Individual Pursuit Champion
  - 1st Overall Ronde van Nederland
    - 1st Stage 4a
    - 1st Stage 7
  - 1st Nokere Koerse
  - 1st Bordeaux–Paris
- 1953
  - 1st Dutch Individual Pursuit Champion
  - 1st Tour of Flanders
  - 1st Stage 1 Giro d'Italia
  - 1st Stage 16 Tour de France
  - 1st Stage 2b Dwars door Vlaanderen
  - 2nd Gent–Wevelgem
  - 2nd Bordeaux–Paris
- 1954
  - 1st Overall Ronde van Nederland
    - 1st Stage 3
    - 1st Stage 4
    - 1st Stage 7
  - 1st Stage 4b Tour de France
  - 1st Overall Driedaagse van Antwerpen
  - 2nd Bordeaux–Paris
- 1955
  - 1st Dutch Individual Pursuit Champion
  - 1st Stage 1b (TTT) Tour de France
  - 2nd Overall Ronde van Nederland
    - 1st Stage 2
    - 1st Stage 7
  - 3rd World Individual Pursuit Championships
- 1956
  - 1st Dutch Road Race Championship
  - 1st Dutch Motor-paced Champion
  - 2nd Overall Ronde van Nederland
    - 1st Stage 8a
  - 3rd Overall Driedaagse van Antwerpen
    - 1st Stage 2b (TTT)
    - 1st Stage 3a
  - 1st GP Stad Vilvoorde
  - 2nd Kuurne–Brussels–Kuurne
- 1957
  - 1st Dutch Road Race Championship
  - 2nd Overall Ronde van Nederland
    - 1st Stage 4
    - 1st Stage 6
- 1958
  - 1st Dutch Motor-paced Champion
- 1960
  - 1st Stage 7 Ronde van Nederland
- 1961
  - 1st Bordeaux–Paris

== See also ==
- List of Dutch cyclists who have led the Tour de France general classification

Sporting positions
Preceded by Thijs Roks	Dutch National Road Race Champion; 1956–1957	Succeeded by Jef Lahaye
