= Jean Malléjac =

French cyclist

Personal information
- Full name: Jean Malléjac
- Born: 19 July 1929 Dirinon, France
- Died: 24 September 2000 (aged 71) Landerneau, France

Cycling career
- Sport: Cycling
- Discipline: Road
- Role: Rider

Major wins
- One stage 1953 Tour de France

Jean Malléjac (19 July 1929 – 24 September 2000) was a professional French road bicycle racer.

== Career ==
Malléjac was born at Dirinon. Previously a worker in the munitions factory in Brest, he was professional from 1950 with the Stella-Dunlop team. His biggest accomplishment was when riding for the Terrot Hutchinson team, he won a stage and wore the yellow jersey as leader of the general classification for five days on his way to finishing the 1953 Tour de France second overall behind Louison Bobet.

In 1955, as rider number 9 in the French team led by Bobet, Malléjac prepared to ride over Mont Ventoux on stage 12 from Marseille to Avignon. It is a climb that riders have always feared because the first two-thirds are through a forest where the air seems humid and scarce and the rest through a bleak, lunar landscape that is proof of Mont Ventoux's history as a volcano. The French writer Antoine Blondin wrote:

There are few happy memories of this sorcerer's cauldron. We have seen riders reduced to madness under the effect of the heat or stimulants, some coming back down the hairpins they thought they were climbing, others brandishing their pumps and accusing us of murder... Falling men, tongues hanging out, selling their soul for a drop of water, a little shade.

Ten kilometres from the summit, said the journalist Jacques Augendre, Malléjac was: "Streaming with sweat, haggard and comatose, he was zigzagging and the road wasn't wide enough for him... He was already no longer in the real world, still less in the world of cyclists and the Tour de France." Malléjac collapsed, falling to the ground with one foot still trapped in a pedal. The other leg pedalled on in the air. He was, said Pierre Chany, "completely unconscious, his face the colour of a corpse, a freezing sweat ran on his forehead.

Malléjac was hauled to the side of the road by Sauveur Ducazeaux, an official of another team, and Dumas summoned. Georges Pahnoud of the Télégramme de Brest reported:

He had to force [Malléjec's] jaws apart to try to make him drink and it was a quarter of an hour later, after he had received an injection of solucamphor and been given oxygen, that Malléjac regained consciousness. Taken by ambulance, he hadn't however completely recovered. He fought, he gesticulated, he shouted, demanded his bike, wanted to get out.

Dumas had to strap Malléjac down for the journey to hospital at Avignon. Malléjac and Dumas were equally furious, Malléjac insisting he had been drugged against his will and that he wanted to start legal proceedings, Dumas saying: "I'm prepared to call for a charge of attempted murder."

Malléjac recovered and rode the Tour four more times before he stopped racing in 1959. He retired to run a driving school at Landerneau, near where he was born. He denied wrongdoing up to his death in September 2000 at Landerneau.

== Teams ==
1950 -1951: Stella-Dunlop 1952: Stella-Huret 1953 - 1955: Terrot-Hutchinson 1956 - 1958: St Raphaël-Géminiani

== Major results ==
1950
Callac
1953
Tour de France:

Winner stage 5
Wearing yellow jersey for five days
2nd place overall classification

1954
Tour de France:

5th place overall classification

== See also ==
- List of doping cases in cycling
