= Bernard Quennehen =

French cyclist

Personal information
- Full name: Bernard Quennehen
- Born: 31 May 1930 Amiens, France
- Died: January 2016 (aged 85)

Cycling career
- Sport: Cycling
- Discipline: Road
- Role: Rider

Major wins
- 1 stage Tour de France

Bernard Quennehen (31 May 1930 – January 2016) was a French professional road bicycle racer between 1952 and 1954. He won two stage victories, one in the Circuit des Six Provinces, and one in the 1953 Tour de France, for which he is most remembered.

== Major results ==
1953
Tour de France:

Winner stage 14
