= Livio Isotti =

Italian cyclist

Personal information
- Full name: Livio Isotti
- Born: 29 June 1927 Pesaro, Italy
- Died: 19 September 1999 (aged 72) Hamilton, Canada

Cycling career
- Sport: Cycling
- Discipline: Road
- Role: Rider

Major wins
- 1 stage Tour de France

Livio Isotti (29 June 1927 – 19 September 1999) was an Italian professional road bicycle racer from 1950 to 1955. He also competed in the individual and team road race events at the 1948 Summer Olympics.

== Major results ==
1950
Giro della Romagna
1953
Tour de France:

Winner stage 7
