= Giancarlo Astrua =

Italian cyclist

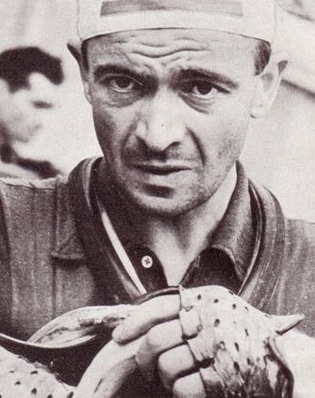

Personal information
- Full name: Giancarlo Astrua
- Born: 11 August 1927 Graglia, Italy
- Died: 29 July 2010 (aged 82)

Cycling career
- Sport: Cycling
- Discipline: Road
- Role: Rider

Major wins
- 4 stages Giro d'Italia

Giancarlo Astrua (11 August 1927 – 29 July 2010) was an Italian professional road bicycle racer. He was born in Graglia.

== Major results ==
1949
Giro d'Italia:

5th place overall classification

1950
Giro d'Italia:

Winner stage 15

1951
Giro d'Italia:

Winner stage 12

1952
Giro d'Italia:

7th place overall classification

Trofeo Baracchi (with Nino Defilippis)
1953
Giro della Romagna
Tour de France:

3rd place overall classification

1954
GP Industria in Belmonte-Piceno
Giro d'Italia:

5th place overall classification

1955
Giro d'Italia:

Winner stage 5

Tour de France:

7th place overall classification

1956
Vuelta a España:

Winner stage 12
