= Maurice Quentin =

French cyclist (1920–2013)

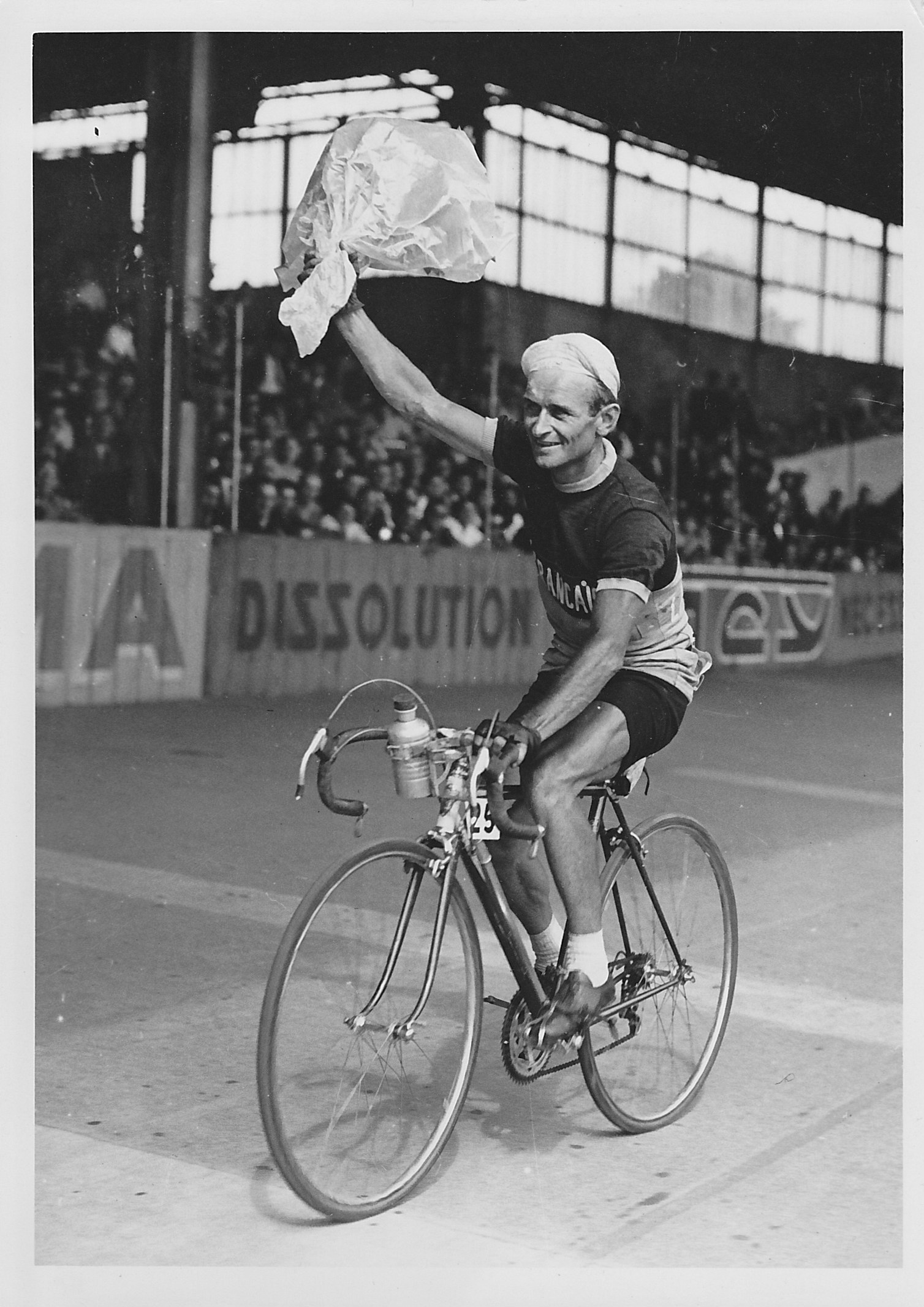
- Maurice quentin, was a French professional road bicycle racer.

Personal information
- Full name: Maurice Quentin
- Born: 2 June 1920 Maizières-les-Metz, France
- Died: 19 April 2013 (aged 92)

Cycling career
- Sport: Cycling
- Discipline: Road
- Role: Rider

Major wins
- 1 stage Tour de France

Maurice Quentin (Maizières-les-Metz, 2 June 1920 – 19 April 2013) was a French professional road bicycle racer.

== Major results ==
1945
GP du Débarquement Nord
1946
GP Courrier Picard
1947
Nouan-le-Fuzelier
1949
Tour du Calvados
Paris - Clermont-Ferrand
1950
Pont-l'Abbé
1952
Circuit des Boucles de la Seine
1953
Tour de France:

Winner stage 15

1956
Lannion
1957
GP d'Espéraza
Circuit des Hautes-Vosges
