= Thijs Roks =

Dutch cyclist

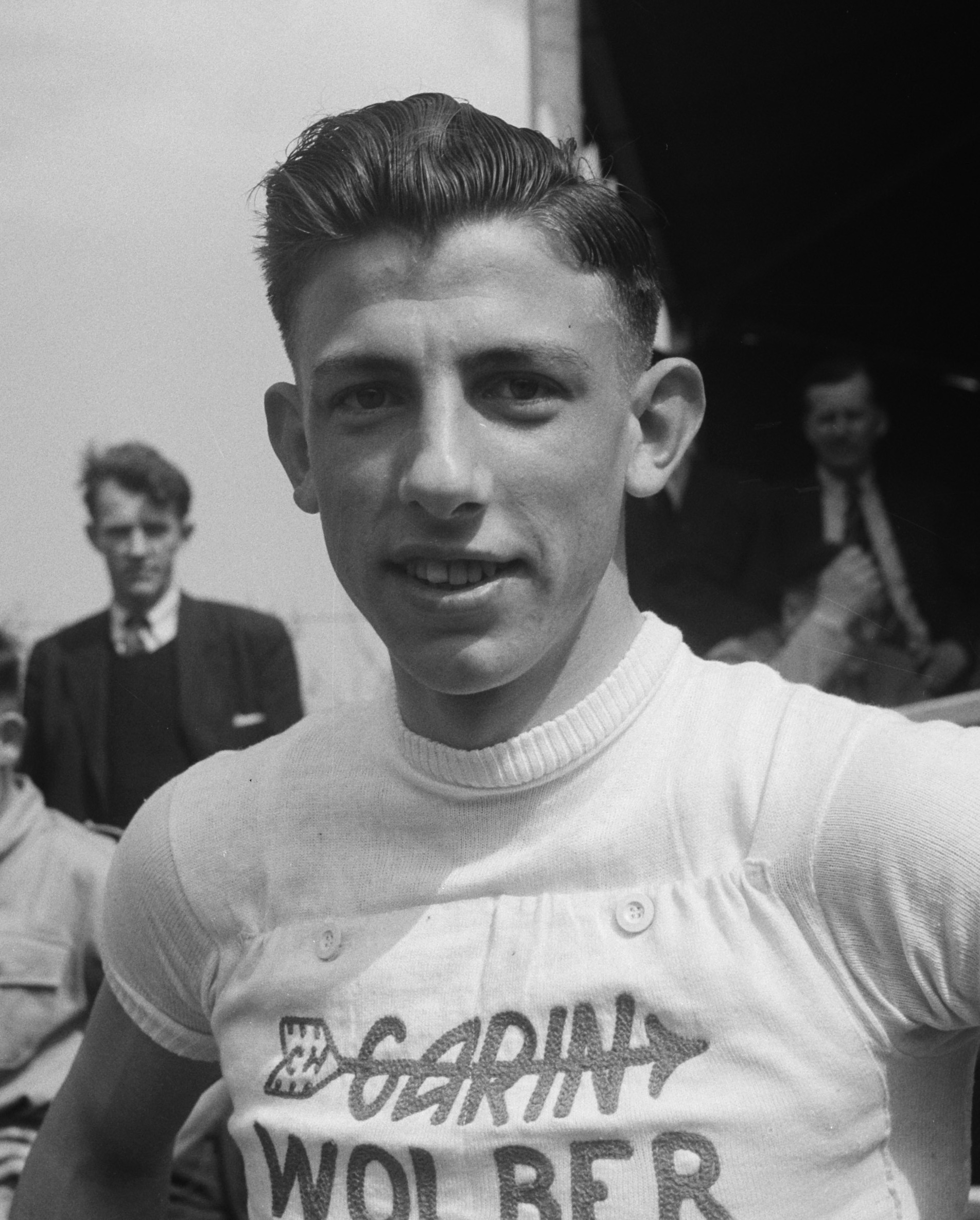
- Thijs Roks in 1952

Personal information
- Born: 30 November 1930 Sprundel, Netherlands
- Died: 7 February 2007 (aged 76) Zundert, Netherlands

Cycling career
- Sport: Cycling
- Discipline: Road
- Role: Rider

Thijs Roks (30 November 1930 – 7 February 2007) was a Dutch racing cyclist. He rode the Tour de France in 1952–1954 with the best result of 29th place in 1953; that year he finished in third place at the first stage of the Tour. He competed in the Giro d'Italia four times (1952–1955), and won the road race at the national championships of 1955.

Roks married on 10 August 1953. In the late 1960s he developed an acute form of rheumatism and ended up in a wheelchair. One of his sons was killed in a driving accident in 1973, aged 17. Ten years later, his other son drowned while fishing, aged 21. His wife died in 1991 of thrombosis, aged 58. Yet despite all those events, Roks was noted for his cheerful spirit through his life.
