= Jacques Renaud =

French cyclist (1923–2020)

Personal information
- Born: 13 December 1923
- Died: 2 January 2020 (aged 96)

Cycling career
- Sport: Cycling
- Role: Rider

Jacques Renaud (13 December 1923 – 2 January 2020) was a French racing cyclist. He rode in the 1950 Tour de France.
