= Tour Auvergne-Rhône-Alpes =

French multi-day road cycling race

Race details
- Date: Early June
- Region: Rhône-Alpes, France
- Local name: Critérium du Dauphiné (in French)
- Nickname: The Dauphiné
- Discipline: Road
- Competition: UCI World Tour
- Type: Major one week stage race
- Organiser: Amaury Sport Organisation
- Race director: Bernard Thévenet; Gilles Maignan
- Web site: www.tour-auvergne-rhone-alpes.fr/en

History
- First edition: 1947
- Editions: 78 (as of 2026)
- First winner: Edward Klabiński (POL)
- Most wins: Nello Lauredi (FRA); Luis Ocaña (ESP); Charly Mottet (FRA); Bernard Hinault (FRA); Chris Froome (GBR) (3 wins each)
- Most recent: Isaac del Toro (MEX)

The Tour Auvergne-Rhône-Alpes (until 2025 edition known as Critérium du Dauphiné, before 2010 known as the Critérium du Dauphiné Libéré) is an annual cycling road race in the Dauphiné region in the southeast of France. The race is run over eight days during the first half of June. It is part of the UCI World Tour calendar and counts as one of the foremost races in the lead-up to the Tour de France in July, along with the Tour de Suisse in the latter half of June.

The race was inaugurated in 1947 by a local newspaper, the Dauphiné Libéré, which was the event's title sponsor until 2009. Since 2010 the race has been organized by ASO, which also organizes most other prominent French cycling races, notably the Tour de France, Paris–Nice and Paris–Roubaix.

As the Dauphiné is set in the Rhône-Alpes region, part of the French Alps, the race's protagonists are often climbing specialists. Many well-known climbs from the Tour de France – like the Mont Ventoux, the Col du Galibier or Col de la Chartreuse – are regularly addressed in the Dauphiné. Five riders, Nello Lauredi, Luis Ocaña, Charly Mottet, Bernard Hinault and Chris Froome, share the record of most wins, with three each.

== History ==
=== Creation ===
The race was created in 1947 by newspaper Le Dauphiné libéré to promote its circulation. After World War II, as cycling recovered from a universal five- or six-year hiatus, the Grenoble-based newspaper decided to create and organize a cycling stage race covering the Dauphiné region. The race was named after the newspaper and set in June, prior to the Tour de France. Polish rider Edward Klabiński won the inaugural edition.

Because of its mountainous route and date on the calendar, the race served as preparation for the Tour de France by French cyclists. French cycling icons Jean Robic and Louison Bobet used the Dauphiné Libéré as the ultimate stage race in their build-up towards the Tour de France.

The event was discontinued for two years in 1967 and 1968. The current form of the Critérium du Dauphiné is the consequence of a merger with the Circuit des Six-Provinces-Dauphiné in 1969. For many years, the organization of the Dauphiné was shared between the newspaper publishers and ASO. In 2010, the newspaper ceded all organizational responsibility to ASO, and the race's name was abbreviated to Critérium du Dauphiné.

=== World Tour Event ===
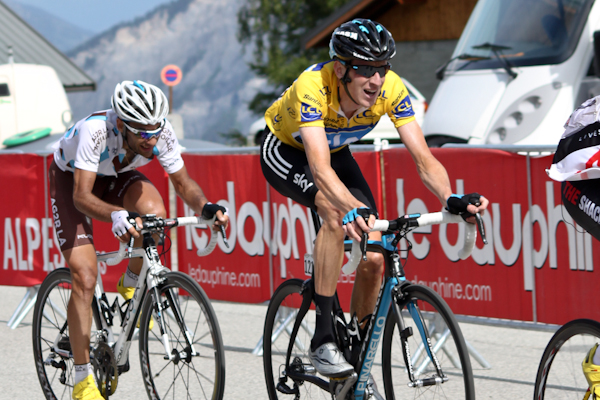
Bradley Wiggins (in the yellow jersey) and Jean-Christophe Péraud during the 2011 Critérium du Dauphiné.

In the 1990s the race was categorized as a UCI 2.HC event, cycling's highest-rated stage races behind the Grand Tours. In 2005 it was included in the inaugural UCI Pro Tour and in 2011 in its successor, the UCI World Tour.

The Critérium du Dauphiné is the only race that was won by all the quintuple winners of the Tour de France, namely Jacques Anquetil, Eddy Merckx, Bernard Hinault and Miguel Induráin. Twelve racers have also won the race and the Tour de France in the same year: Louison Bobet in 1955; Anquetil in 1963; Merckx in 1971; Luis Ocaña in 1973; Bernard Thévenet in 1975; Hinault in 1979 and 1981; Induráin in 1995; Bradley Wiggins in 2012; Chris Froome in 2013, 2015, and 2016; Geraint Thomas in 2018; Jonas Vingegaard in 2023 and Tadej Pogačar in 2025. Lance Armstrong won the race in 2002 and 2003, but was retroactively stripped of his titles in 2013, in the wake of the protracted doping scandal.

In 2025, ASO announced that the race would be rebranded as Tour Auvergne-Rhône-Alpes from 2026 onwards, owing to a partnership with the local region of Auvergne-Rhône-Alpes that hosts the event.

== Route ==
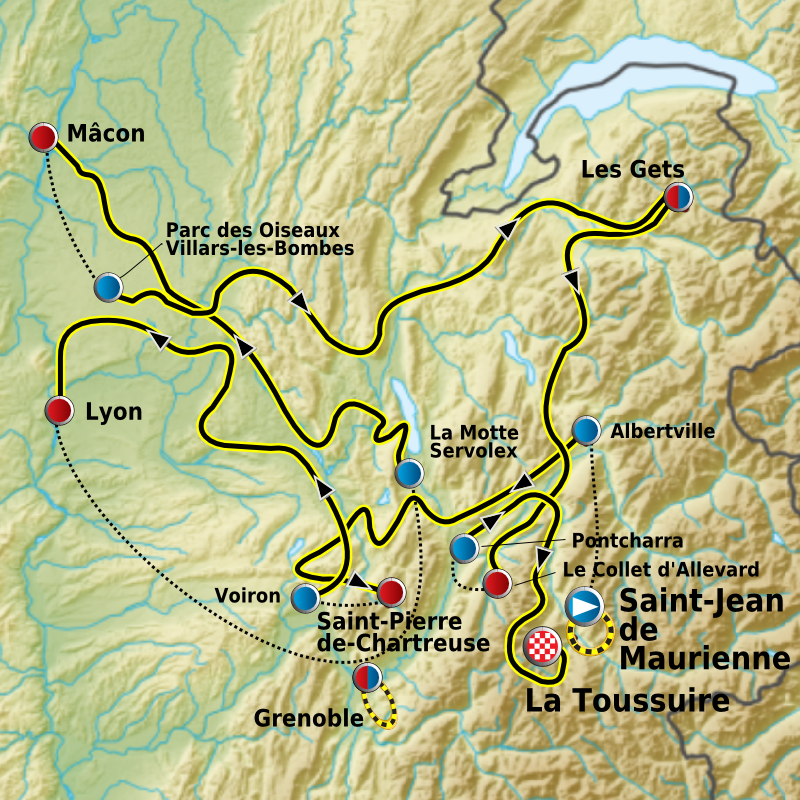
Route of the 2011 race

The Dauphiné is raced over 8 days in the Rhône-Alpes region in the southeast of France, traditionally covering portions of the French Alps. The race has often, but not always, started with an opening prologue on Sunday. The Monday and Tuesday stages are usually held in the lower hilly regions of Rhône-Alpes, before addressing the high mountains in the second half of the Dauphiné. Often there is one long individual or team time trial included.

Benefiting from its location and place on the calendar, race organizers often feature a mountain stage with a route that is nearly identical to what the Tour will trace one month later.

Grenoble, the capital of the Dauphiné region, has hosted the start or finish of a stage most often. Other cities regularly hosting a stage are Avignon, Saint-Étienne, Annecy, Chambéry, Gap, Lyon, Aix-les-Bains, Valence, Briançon and Vals-les-Bains.

== Jerseys ==
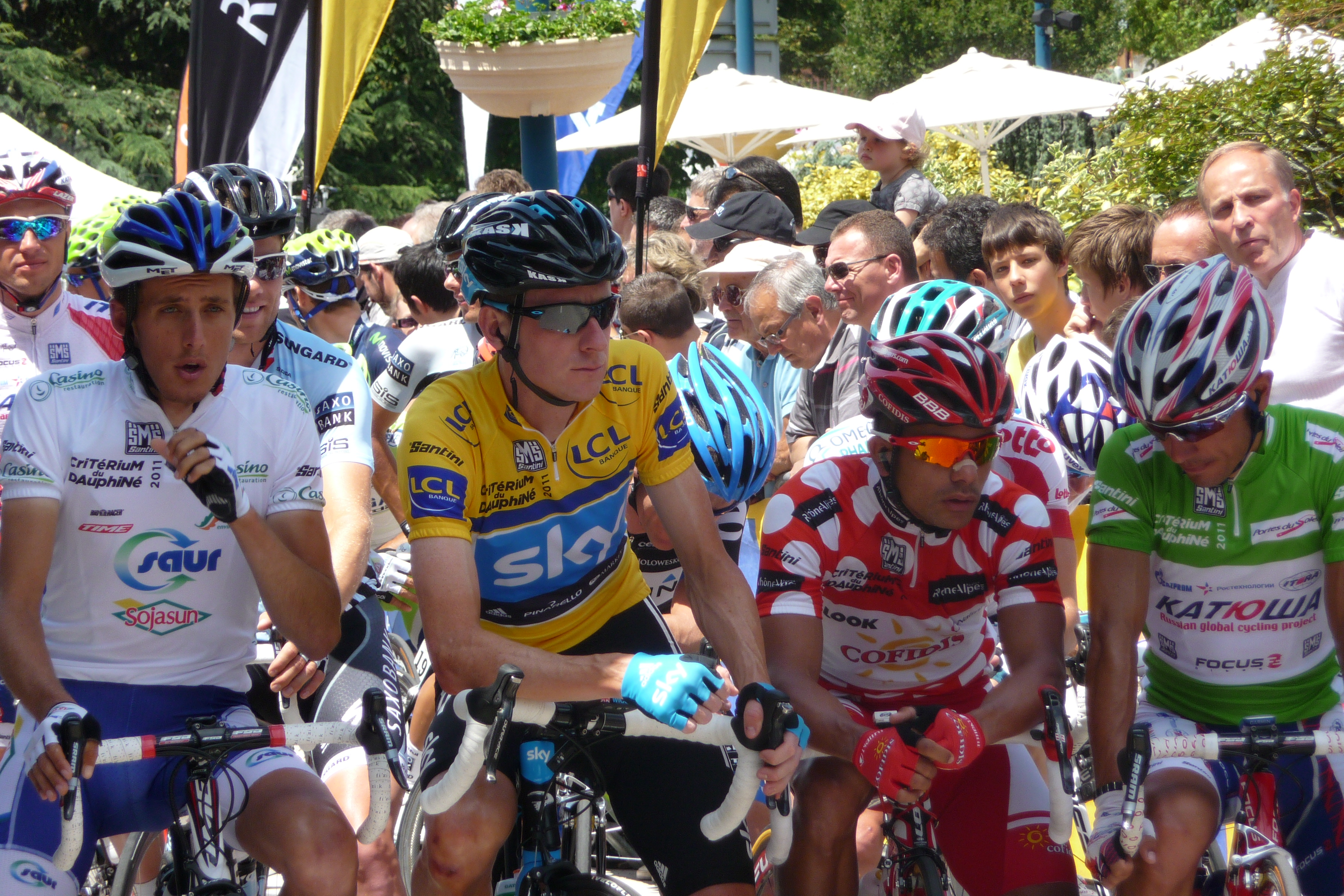
Jersey wearers at the 2011 event

The leader of the general classification wears a yellow jersey with a blue band, distinct from the other racers. In 1948, a mountains classification was added, which as of 2017 gives a polka-dot jersey to the leader. In 1955, a points classification was added, which gives a green jersey to the leader. The highest ranked young rider (not older than 25 years) wears a white jersey).

== Winners ==
Year	Country	Rider	Team
1947	Poland	Edward Klabiński	Mercier–Hutchinson
1948	France	Édouard Fachleitner	La Perle–Hutchinson
1949	France	Lucien Lazaridès	France Sport–Dunlop
1950	France	Nello Lauredi	Helyett–Hutchinson
1951	France	Nello Lauredi	Helyett–Hutchinson
1952	France	Jean Dotto	France Sport
1953	France	Lucien Teisseire	Terrot–Hutchinson
1954	France	Nello Lauredi	Terrot–Hutchinson
1955	France	Louison Bobet	Mercier–BP–Hutchinson
1956	Belgium	Alex Close	Elvé–Peugeot
1957	France	Marcel Rohrbach	Peugeot–BP–Dunlop
1958	France	Louis Rostollan	Essor–Leroux
1959	France	Henry Anglade	Liberia–Hutchinson
1960	France	Jean Dotto	Liberia–Grammont
1961	Great Britain	Brian Robinson	Rapha–Gitane–Dunlop
1962	France	Raymond Mastrotto	Gitane–Leroux–Dunlop–R. Geminiani
1963	France	Jacques Anquetil	Saint-Raphaël–Gitane–R. Geminiani
1964	Spain	Valentín Uriona	Kas–Kaskol
1965	France	Jacques Anquetil	Ford France–Gitane
1966	France	Raymond Poulidor	Mercier–BP–Hutchinson
1969	France	Raymond Poulidor	Mercier–BP–Hutchinson
1970	Spain	Luis Ocaña	Bic
1971	Belgium	Eddy Merckx	Molteni
1972	Spain	Luis Ocaña	Bic
1973	Spain	Luis Ocaña	Bic
1974	France	Alain Santy	Gan–Mercier–Hutchinson
1975	France	Bernard Thévenet	Peugeot–BP–Michelin
1976	France	Bernard Thévenet	Peugeot–Esso–Michelin
1977	France	Bernard Hinault	Gitane–Campagnolo
1978	Belgium	Michel Pollentier	Old Lord's–Splendor–K.S.B.
1979	France	Bernard Hinault	Renault–Gitane
1980	Netherlands	Johan van der Velde	TI–Raleigh–Creda
1981	France	Bernard Hinault	Renault–Elf–Gitane
1982	France	Michel Laurent	Peugeot–Shell–Michelin
1983	United States	Greg LeMond (Note: The initial winner, Frenchman Pascal Simon was disqualified after a positive doping test.)	Renault–Elf
1984	Colombia	Martín Ramírez	Système U
1985	Australia	Phil Anderson	Panasonic–Raleigh
1986	Switzerland	Urs Zimmermann	Carrera Jeans–Vagabond
1987	France	Charly Mottet	Système U
1988	Colombia	Luis Herrera	Café de Colombia
1989	France	Charly Mottet	RMO
1990	Great Britain	Robert Millar	Z–Tomasso
1991	Colombia	Luis Herrera	Postobón–Manzana–Ryalcao
1992	France	Charly Mottet	RMO
1993	Switzerland	Laurent Dufaux	ONCE
1994	Switzerland	Laurent Dufaux	ONCE
1995	Spain	Miguel Induráin	Banesto
1996	Spain	Miguel Induráin	Banesto
1997	Germany	Udo Bölts	Team Telekom
1998	France	Armand de Las Cuevas	Banesto
1999	Kazakhstan	Alexander Vinokourov	Casino–Ag2r Prévoyance
2000	United States	Tyler Hamilton	U.S. Postal Service
2001	France	Christophe Moreau	Festina
2002	Result void (Note: The initial winner, American Lance Armstrong was disqualified and stripped of his win after the findings of a USADA investigation.)		
2003	Result void (Note: The initial winner, American Lance Armstrong was disqualified and stripped of his win after the findings of a USADA investigation.)		
2004	Spain	Iban Mayo	Euskaltel–Euskadi
2005	Spain	Iñigo Landaluze	Euskaltel–Euskadi
2006	Result void (Note: The initial winner, American Levi Leipheimer was disqualified after the findings of a USADA investigation.)		
2007	France	Christophe Moreau	AG2R Prévoyance
2008	Spain	Alejandro Valverde	Caisse d'Epargne
2009	Spain	Alejandro Valverde	Caisse d'Epargne
2010	Slovenia	Janez Brajkovič	Team RadioShack
2011	Great Britain	Bradley Wiggins	Team Sky
2012	Great Britain	Bradley Wiggins	Team Sky
2013	Great Britain	Chris Froome	Team Sky
2014	United States	Andrew Talansky	Garmin–Sharp
2015	Great Britain	Chris Froome	Team Sky
2016	Great Britain	Chris Froome	Team Sky
2017	Denmark	Jakob Fuglsang	Astana
2018	Great Britain	Geraint Thomas	Team Sky
2019	Denmark	Jakob Fuglsang	Astana
2020	Colombia	Daniel Martínez	EF Pro Cycling
2021	Australia	Richie Porte	INEOS Grenadiers
2022	Slovenia	Primož Roglič	Team Jumbo–Visma
2023	Denmark	Jonas Vingegaard	Team Jumbo–Visma
2024	Slovenia	Primož Roglič	Bora–Hansgrohe
2025	Slovenia	Tadej Pogačar	UAE Team Emirates XRG
2026	Mexico	Isaac del Toro	UAE Team Emirates XRG

=== Multiple winners ===
Riders in italic are still active

Rider	Editions	
3	Nello Lauredi (FRA)	1950, 1951, 1954
3	Luis Ocaña (ESP)	1970, 1972, 1973
3	Bernard Hinault (FRA)	1977, 1979, 1981
3	Charly Mottet (FRA)	1987, 1989, 1992
3	Chris Froome (GBR)	2013, 2015, 2016
2	Jean Dotto (FRA)	1952 + 1960
2	Jacques Anquetil (FRA)	1963 + 1965
2	Raymond Poulidor (FRA)	1966 + 1969
2	Bernard Thévenet (FRA)	1975 + 1976
2	Luis Herrera (COL)	1988 + 1991
2	Laurent Dufaux (SUI)	1993 + 1994
2	Miguel Induráin (ESP)	1995 + 1996
2	~~Lance Armstrong (USA)~~	2002 + 2003
2	Christophe Moreau (FRA)	2001 + 2007
2	Alejandro Valverde (ESP)	2008 + 2009
2	Bradley Wiggins (GBR)	2011 + 2012
2	Jakob Fuglsang (DEN)	2017 + 2019
2	Primož Roglič (SLO)	2022 + 2024

=== Wins per country ===
There have been 78 editions since 1947. Three editions (2002, 2003 and 2006) have been stripped of their initial winners Lance Armstrong and Levi Leipheimer. Organizer ASO intends to keep these results voided.

Wins	Country
30	France
10	Spain
8	Great Britain
4	Colombia; Slovenia
3	Belgium; Denmark; Switzerland; United States
2	Australia
1	Germany; Kazakhstan; Netherlands; Poland; Mexico
