= Le Collet d'Allevard =

Ski resort in the French Alps

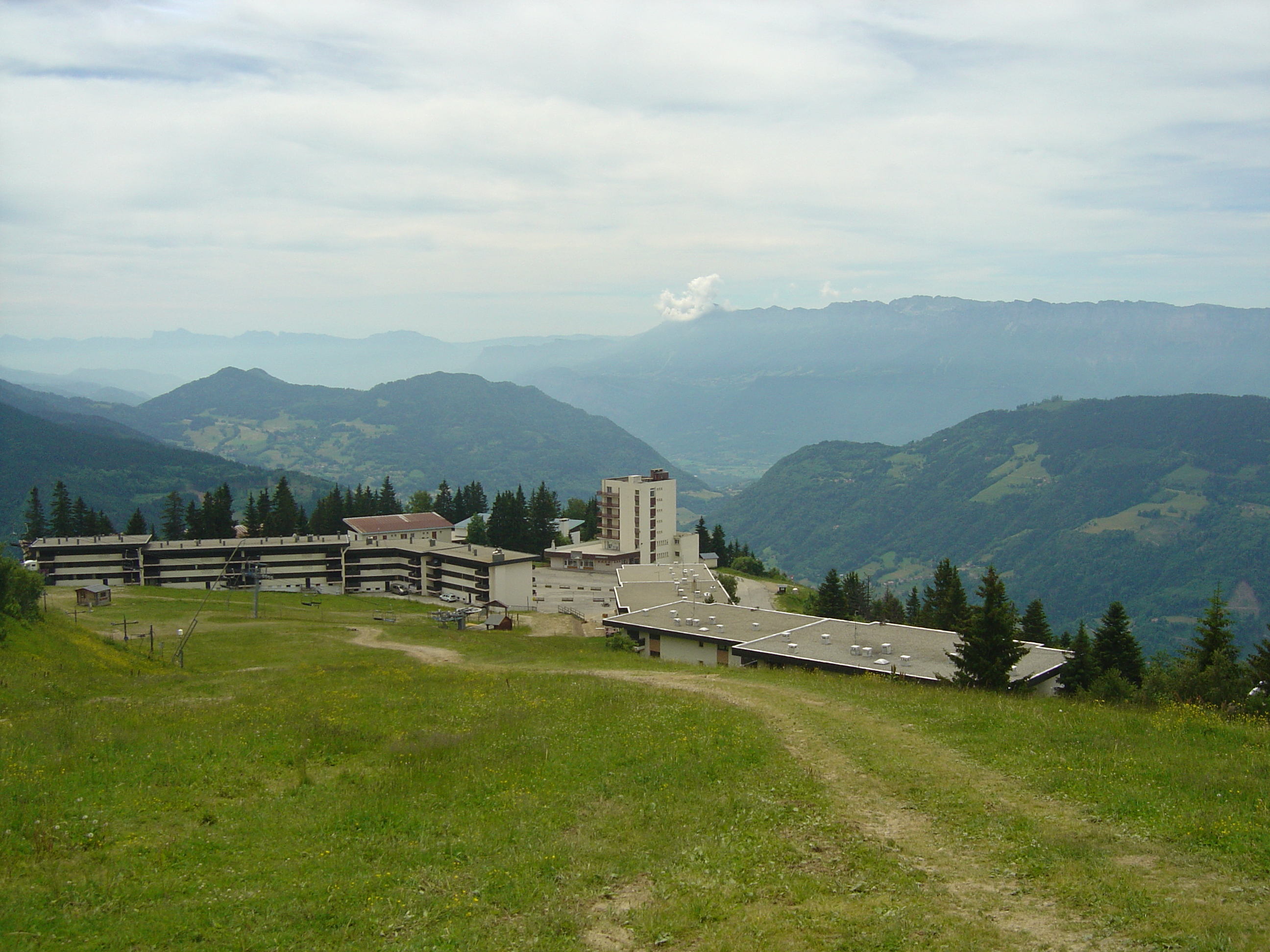
- A view of the ski station in summer

- Location within France Location within Auvergne-Rhône-Alpes Location within Alps
- Location: Isère, Auvergne-Rhône-Alpes, France
- Nearest city: Chambéry
- Coordinates: 45°23′43″N 6°06′39″E
- Opened: 1955
- Top elevation: 2,085 m (6,841 ft)
- Base elevation: 1,450 m (4,760 ft)
- Trails: 28
- Total length: 35 km (22 mi)
- Lift system: 11
- Snowmaking: Yes
- Night skiing: Yes
- Website: www.lecollet.com

Le Collet d'Allevard is a ski resort in the Belledonne range of the French Alps, located in the department of Isère in the Auvergne-Rhône-Alpes region, approximately 11.5 km (7.1 mi) from Allevard. The ski area extends over the communes of Allevard and La Chapelle-du-Bard. The resort was created in 1955 on former communal pastures and served by a new road following the route of the old forest road. The resort reached its current size in 1975, subsequent developments having mainly consisted of improving the existing resort. It is made up of the resort of Collet d'Allevard itself at an altitude of 1,400 m (4,600 ft) as well as the snow areas of Pré Rond at an altitude of 1,550 m (5,090 ft) and Super Collet at an altitude of 1,650 m (5,410 ft). The ski area rises to an altitude of almost 2,100 m (6,900 ft) at Les Plagnes.

== Sport ==
=== Alpine skiing ===
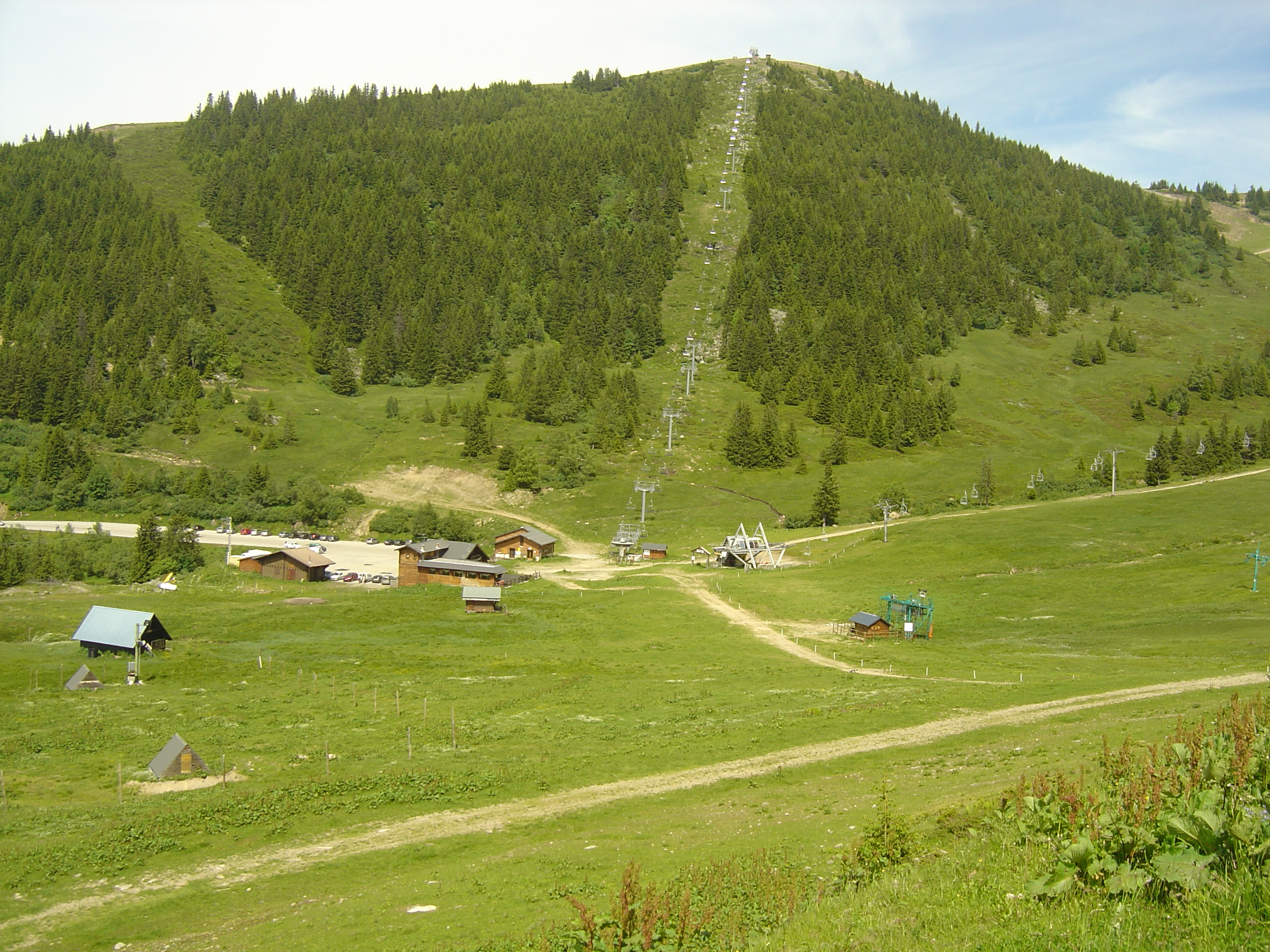
The station of Super Collet at 1,630 m (5,350 ft)

==== Routes ====
There are four very different sectors within the resort, each defined by its orientation, landscape and altitude: These are Malatrait, which faces southwest at altitudes between 1,450 and 1,750 m (4,760–5,740 ft); Fontaineterre, facing north-northwest at altitudes between 1,500 and 1,750 m (4,920–5,740 ft) and Pré Rond, facing north at altitudes between 1,550 and 2,000 m (5,090–6,560 ft). The highest is from Les Plagnes down to Le Super Collet, facing west-northwest at altitudes between 1,550 and 2,100 m (5,090–6,890 ft).

==== Night skiing ====
Le Collet d'Allevard offers one of the largest night ski areas in Europe, having ten floodlit slopes and four ski lifts. For several years, Le Collet organized La nuit du ski each 30 December, which brought together the best skiers of the French national team. The first event was hosted by Jean-Pierre Vidal in 2012. The 2013 La nuit du ski was hosted by Marion Rolland. The third event in 2014 was planned to be hosted by Marie Bochet. However, the event was cancelled due to poor snow conditions. In 2015, logistical difficulties resulted in a second year without the event and La nuit du ski was planned to return in 2016.

=== Cycling ===
==== Route profile ====
From Allevard-les-Bains, at the crossroads of the Avenue de Savoie and the Route du Collet, the ascent is about 11.3 km (7.0 mi) long, with an average gradient of 8.4%. After 1.3 km (0.81 mi), cyclists turn onto the D109 road, while the D525a road continues to Le Pleynet. The gradient is hard and steady, with little respite. Only the good road surface relieves the effort a little. After a few kilometres of climbing, a rider can see Allevard-les-Bains and its lake further down. After that, the rest of the climb is entirely in the forest. After 4.2 km (2.6 mi) of climbing, there is a long straight section of about 1.5 km (0.93 mi) which does not allow you to restart while the gradient is over 9% and difficult. A special feature of this climb is that each hairpin has a name (Wing's Virage and Enroule's Virage, etc.). The penultimate kilometre is also close to a gradient of 10% on average. The last few hundred metres are easier as far as Place Marcel Dumas, in Le Collet d'Allevard resort. However, near the Malatrait ski lift, it is possible to continue further up the resort to the Clos des Gentianes at an altitude of about 1,545 m (5,069 ft).

In addition, when arriving at the bottom of Place Marcel Dumas, it is also possible to continue to Super Collet at an altitude of 1,639 m (5,377 ft), a further 4.45 km (2.77 mi) up the road, but with a 5.2% average gradient. except for a slightly more difficult ramp 1 km (0.62 mi) from Super Collet. In total, this route is 15.8 km (9.8 mi) long at an average gradient of 7.4%, also starting from Allevard-les-Bains.

==== Cycle racing ====
Le Collet d'Allevard has featured in several stage finishes of the Critérium du Dauphiné.

Year	Stage	Route	Distance	Stage winner	Yellow jersey	Ref.
2024	6	Hauterives to Le Collet d'Allevard	174.1 km (108.2 mi)	Primož Roglič	Primož Roglič	
2011	6	Les Gets to Le Collet d'Allevard	192.5 km (119.6 mi)	Joaquim Rodríguez	Bradley Wiggins	
1994	5	Échirolles to Le Collet d'Allevard	173.5 km (107.8 mi)	Pascal Hervé	Laurent Dufaux	
1992	6	Cluses to Le Collet d'Allevard	204 km (127 mi)	Martín Farfán	Luc Leblanc	
