= 1950 Critérium du Dauphiné Libéré =

Race details
- Dates: 25 June – 2 July 1950
- Stages: 7
- Distance: 1,623 km (1,008 mi)
- Winning time: 47h 49' 26"

Results
	Winner	Nello Lauredi (ITA)	(Helyett–Hutchinson)
	Second	Apo Lazaridès (FRA)	(Helyett–Hutchinson)
	Third	Bim Diederich (LUX)	(Garin–Wolber)
	Mountains	Kléber Piot (FRA)	(France-Sport–Dunlop)
	Team	Helyett–Hutchinson	

The 1950 Critérium du Dauphiné Libéré was the fourth edition of the cycle race and was held from 25 June to 2 July 1950. The race started and finished in Grenoble. The race was won by Nello Lauredi of the Helyett team.

== General classification ==
Final general classification

Rank	Rider	Team	Time
1	Nello Lauredi (ITA)	Helyett–Hutchinson	47h 49' 26"
2	Apo Lazaridès (FRA)	Helyett–Hutchinson	+ 9' 28"
3	Bim Diederich (LUX)	Garin–Wolber	+ 29' 58"
4	Pierre Brambilla (FRA)	Mervil–Dunlop	+ 29' 58"
5	Robert Chapatte (FRA)	Olympia–Dunlop	+ 36' 22"
6	Robert Castelin (FRA)	France-Sport–Dunlop	+ 38' 38"
7	Raphaël Géminiani (FRA)	Metropole–Dunlop	+ 41' 09"
8	Armand Baeyens (BEL)	Garin–Wolber	+ 42' 13"
9	Joseph Pagotto (FRA)	Mercier–Hutchinson	+ 45' 54"
10	Roger Pontet (FRA)	Metropole–Dunlop	+ 51' 27"
