= 1951 Critérium du Dauphiné Libéré =

Race details
- Dates: 10–17 June 1951
- Stages: 7
- Distance: 1,632 km (1,014 mi)
- Winning time: 47h 25' 59"

Results
	Winner	Nello Lauredi (FRA)	(Helyett–Hutchinson)
	Second	Antonin Rolland (FRA)	(Rhonson)
	Third	Lucien Lazaridès (FRA)	(France Sport)
	Mountains	Pierre Molinéris (FRA)	(Stella)

The 1951 Critérium du Dauphiné Libéré was the fifth edition of the cycle race and was held from 10 June to 17 June 1951. The race started and finished in Grenoble. The race was won by Nello Lauredi of the Helyett team.

== General classification ==
Final general classification

Rank	Rider	Team	Time
1	Nello Lauredi (FRA)	Helyett–Hutchinson	47h 25' 59"
2	Antonin Rolland (FRA)	Rhonson	+ 5' 16"
3	Lucien Lazaridès (FRA)	France Sport	+ 9' 14"
4	Pierre Molinéris (FRA)	Stella	+ 10' 18"
5	Marcel De Mulder (BEL)	Alcyon–Dunlop	+ 11' 32"
6	Isidoor De Rijck (BEL)	Dilecta	+ 13' 44"
7	Pino Cerami (ITA)	Peugeot–Dunlop	+ 13' 52"
8	Alois Vansteenkiste (BEL)	Mercier–Hutchinson	+ 16' 34"
9	Marcel Verschueren (BEL)	Peugeot–Dunlop	+ 16' 58"
10	Raphaël Géminiani (FRA)	Metropole	+ 17' 12"
