= 1954 Critérium du Dauphiné Libéré =

Race details
- Dates: 12–20 June 1954
- Stages: 8
- Distance: 1,815 km (1,128 mi)
- Winning time: 51h 51' 40"

Results
	Winner	Nello Lauredi (ITA)
	Second	Jean-Pierre Schmitz (LUX)
	Third	Pierre Molinéris (FRA)

The 1954 Critérium du Dauphiné Libéré was the eighth edition of the cycle race and was held from 12 June to 20, June 1954. The race started and finished in Grenoble. The race was won by Nello Lauredi.

== General classification ==
Final general classification

Rank	Rider	Time
1	Nello Lauredi (ITA)	51h 51' 40"
2	Jean-Pierre Schmitz (LUX)	+ 4' 11"
3	Pierre Molinéris (FRA)	+ 6' 50"
4	Charly Gaul (LUX)	+ 6' 51"
5	Louison Bobet (FRA)	+ 7' 19"
6	Jean Dotto (FRA)	+ 7' 22"
7	Jean Dacquay (FRA)	+ 7' 24"
8	Pietro Polo (ITA)	+ 10' 05"
9	Alex Close (BEL)	+ 14' 11"
10	Louis Bergaud (FRA)	+ 14' 43"
