= 1952 Critérium du Dauphiné Libéré =

Race details
- Dates: 1–8 June 1952
- Stages: 7
- Distance: 1,530 km (950 mi)
- Winning time: 42h 47' 01"

Results
	Winner	Jean Dotto (FRA)	(France Sport)
	Second	Nello Lauredi (FRA)	(Mercier–Hutchinson)
	Third	Jean Le Guilly (FRA)	(Dilecta)
	Mountains	Jean Le Guilly (FRA)	(Dilecta)

The 1952 Critérium du Dauphiné Libéré was the sixth edition of the cycle race and was held from 1 June to 8 June 1952. The race started and finished in Grenoble. The race was won by Jean Dotto of the France Sport team.

== General classification ==
Final general classification

Rank	Rider	Team	Time
1	Jean Dotto (FRA)	France Sport	42h 47' 01"
2	Nello Lauredi (FRA)	Mercier–Hutchinson	+ 53"
3	Jean Le Guilly (FRA)	Dilecta	+ 7' 57"
4	Antonin Rolland (FRA)	Terrot	+ 12' 56"
5	Adolphe Deledda (FRA)	Terrot	+ 15' 05"
6	Alois De Hertog (BEL)	Alcyon–Dunlop	+ 18' 26"
7	Leopold De Graevelyn (BEL)	Mercier–Hutchinson	+ 18' 44"
8	Maurice Quentin (FRA)	Alcyon–Dunlop	+ 21' 04"
9	Bernard Gauthier (FRA)	Mercier–Hutchinson	+ 21' 41"
10	Vincent Vitetta (FRA)	Alcyon–Dunlop	+ 23' 50"
