= 2024 Critérium du Dauphiné =

French cycling race

2024 UCI World Tour, race 23 of 35

Race details
- Dates: 2–9 June 2024
- Stages: 8
- Distance: 1,187.6 km (737.9 mi)
- Winning time: 25h 35' 40"

Results
Jersey awarded to the overall winner	Winner	Primož Roglič (SLO)	(Bora–Hansgrohe)
	Second	Matteo Jorgenson (USA)	(Visma–Lease a Bike)
	Third	Derek Gee (CAN)	(Israel–Premier Tech)
Jersey awarded to the points classification winner	Points	Primož Roglič (SLO)	(Bora–Hansgrohe)
Jersey awarded to the mountains classification winner	Mountains	Lorenzo Fortunato (ITA)	(Astana Qazaqstan Team)
Jersey awarded to the young rider classification winner	Young rider	Matteo Jorgenson (USA)	(Visma–Lease a Bike)
	Team	(Germany) Bora–Hansgrohe	

The 2024 Critérium du Dauphiné was a road cycling stage race that took place between 2 and 9 June in the Dauphiné region of southeastern France. It was the 76th edition of Critérium du Dauphiné and the 23rd race of the 2024 UCI World Tour.

== Teams ==
All 18 UCI WorldTeams and four UCI ProTeams made up the 22 teams that participated in the race.

UCI WorldTeams

- Alpecin–Deceuninck
- Arkéa–B&B Hotels
- Astana Qazaqstan Team
- Bora–Hansgrohe
- Cofidis
- Decathlon–AG2R La Mondiale
- EF Education–EasyPost
- Groupama–FDJ
- INEOS Grenadiers
- Intermarché–Wanty
- Lidl–Trek
- Movistar Team
- Soudal–Quick-Step
- Team Bahrain Victorious
- Team dsm–firmenich PostNL
- Team Jayco–AlUla
- UAE Team Emirates
- Visma–Lease a Bike

UCI ProTeams

- Israel–Premier Tech
- Lotto–Dstny
- Q36.5 Pro Cycling Team
- Uno-X Mobility

== Route ==
Stage characteristics and winners
Stage	Date	Course	Distance	Type	Stage winner
1	2 June	Saint-Pourçain-sur-Sioule to Saint-Pourçain-sur-Sioule	172.5 km (107.2 mi)	Flat stage	Mads Pedersen (DEN)
2	3 June	Gannat to Col de la Loge	142 km (88 mi)	Hilly stage	Magnus Cort (DEN)
3	4 June	Celles-sur-Durolle to Les Estables	181.7 km (112.9 mi)	Hilly stage	Derek Gee (CAN)
4	5 June	Saint-Germain-Laval to Neulise	34.4 km (21.4 mi)	Individual time trial	Remco Evenepoel (BEL)
5	6 June	Amplepuis to Saint-Priest	167 km (104 mi)	Hilly stage	race neutralised
6	7 June	Hauterives to Le Collet d'Allevard	174.1 km (108.2 mi)	Mountain stage	Primož Roglič (SLO)
7	8 June	Albertville to Samoëns 1600	155.3 km (96.5 mi)	Mountain stage	Primož Roglič (SLO)
8	9 June	Thônes to Plateau des Glières	160.6 km (99.8 mi)	Mountain stage	Carlos Rodríguez (ESP)
Total			1,187.6 km (737.9 mi)		

== Stages ==
=== Stage 1 ===
2 June 2024 — Saint-Pourçain-sur-Sioule to Saint-Pourçain-sur-Sioule, 172.5 km (107.2 mi)

Stage 1 Result
Rank	Rider	Team	Time
1	Mads Pedersen (DEN)	Lidl–Trek	4h 01' 30"
2	Sam Bennett (IRL)	Decathlon–AG2R La Mondiale	+ 0"
3	Hugo Page (FRA)	Intermarché–Wanty	+ 0"
4	Clément Venturini (FRA)	Arkéa–B&B Hotels	+ 0"
5	Owain Doull (GBR)	EF Education–EasyPost	+ 0"
6	Michele Gazzoli (ITA)	Astana Qazaqstan Team	+ 0"
7	Iván García Cortina (ESP)	Movistar Team	+ 0"
8	Fred Wright (GBR)	Team Bahrain Victorious	+ 0"
9	Clément Russo (FRA)	Groupama–FDJ	+ 0"
10	Magnus Cort (DEN)	Uno-X Mobility	+ 0"

General classification after Stage 1
Rank	Rider	Team	Time
1	Mads Pedersen (DEN)	Lidl–Trek	4h 01' 20"
2	Sam Bennett (IRL)	Decathlon–AG2R La Mondiale	+ 4"
3	Hugo Page (FRA)	Intermarché–Wanty	+ 6"
4	Mathis Le Berre (FRA)	Arkéa–B&B Hotels	+ 7"
5	Mark Donovan (GBR)	Q36.5 Pro Cycling Team	+ 8"
6	Casper Pedersen (DEN)	Soudal–Quick-Step	+ 9"
7	Clément Venturini (FRA)	Arkéa–B&B Hotels	+ 10"
8	Owain Doull (GBR)	EF Education–EasyPost	+ 10"
9	Michele Gazzoli (ITA)	Astana Qazaqstan Team	+ 10"
10	Iván García Cortina (ESP)	Movistar Team	+ 10"

=== Stage 2 ===
3 June 2024 – Gannat to Col de la Loge, 142 km (88 mi)

Stage 2 Result
Rank	Rider	Team	Time
1	Magnus Cort (DEN)	Uno-X Mobility	3h 21' 42"
2	Primož Roglič (SLO)	Bora–Hansgrohe	+ 0"
3	Matteo Jorgenson (USA)	Visma–Lease a Bike	+ 0"
4	Giulio Ciccone (ITA)	Lidl–Trek	+ 0"
5	Oier Lazkano (ESP)	Movistar Team	+ 0"
6	Dylan Teuns (BEL)	Israel–Premier Tech	+ 0"
7	Lukas Nerurkar (GBR)	EF Education–EasyPost	+ 0"
8	Clément Champoussin (FRA)	Arkéa–B&B Hotels	+ 0"
9	Romain Grégoire (FRA)	Groupama–FDJ	+ 0"
10	Guillaume Martin (FRA)	Cofidis	+ 0"

General classification after Stage 2
Rank	Rider	Team	Time
1	Magnus Cort (DEN)	Uno-X Mobility	7h 23' 02"
2	Primož Roglič (SLO)	Bora–Hansgrohe	+ 4"
3	Matteo Jorgenson (USA)	Visma–Lease a Bike	+ 6"
4	Bruno Armirail (FRA)	Decathlon–AG2R La Mondiale	+ 8"
5	Clément Champoussin (FRA)	Arkéa–B&B Hotels	+ 10"
6	Derek Gee (CAN)	Israel–Premier Tech	+ 10"
7	Oier Lazkano (ESP)	Movistar Team	+ 10"
8	Krists Neilands (LAT)	Israel–Premier Tech	+ 10"
9	Juan Ayuso (ESP)	UAE Team Emirates	+ 10"
10	Jack Haig (AUS)	Team Bahrain Victorious	+ 10"

=== Stage 3 ===
4 June 2024 – Celles-sur-Durolle to Les Estables, 181.7 km (112.9 mi)

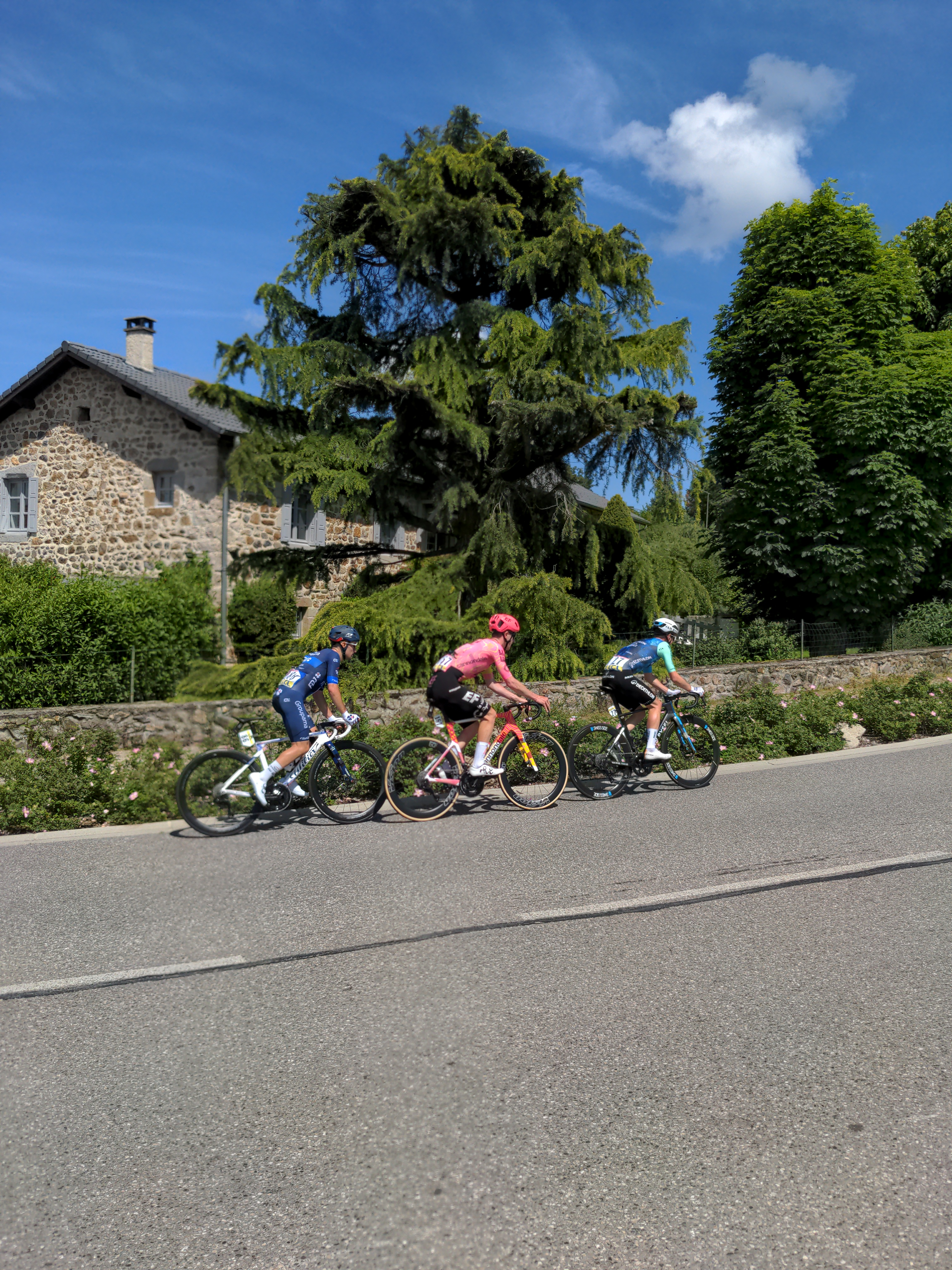
Breakaway à Beaux.

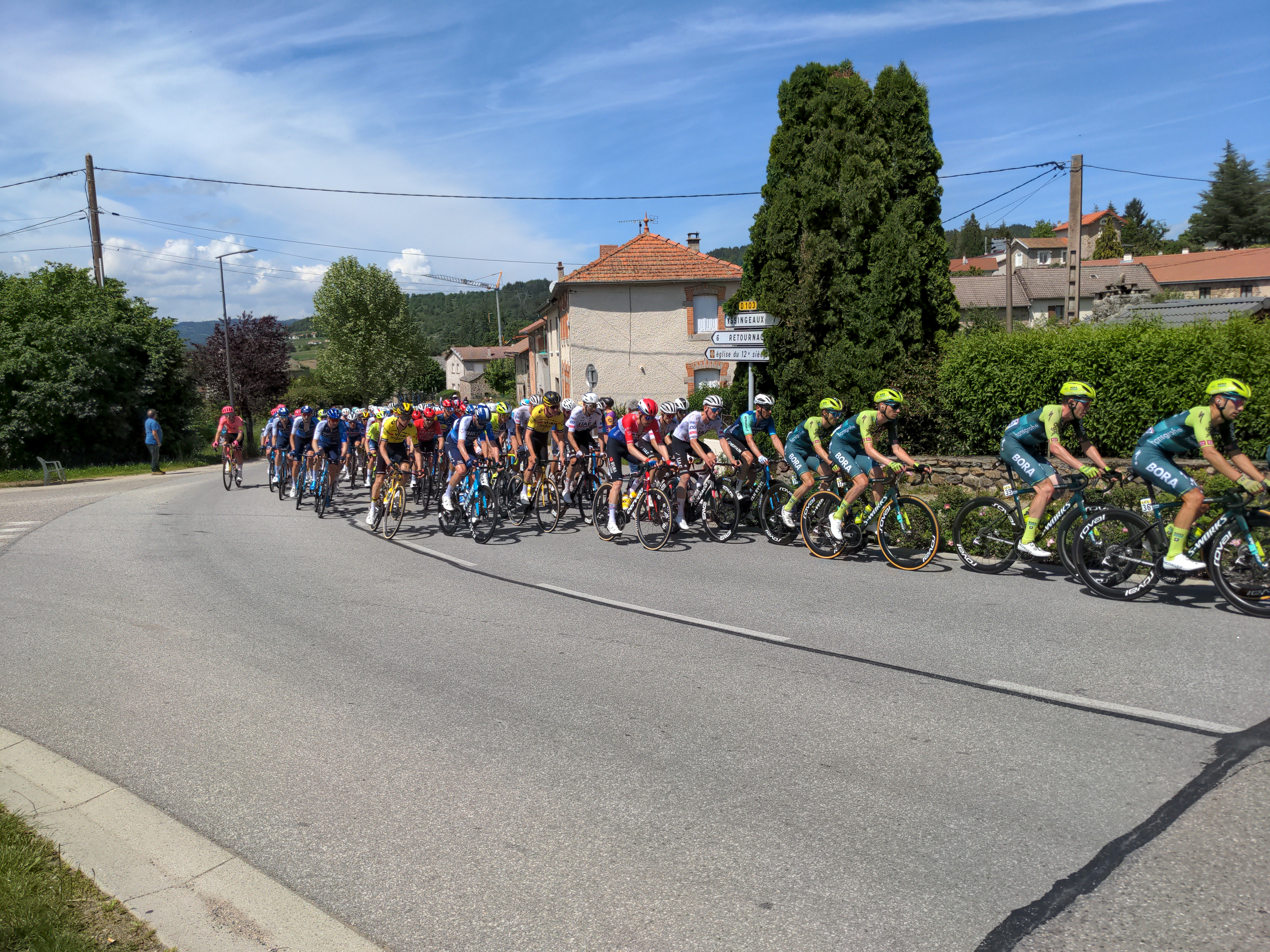
Peloton.

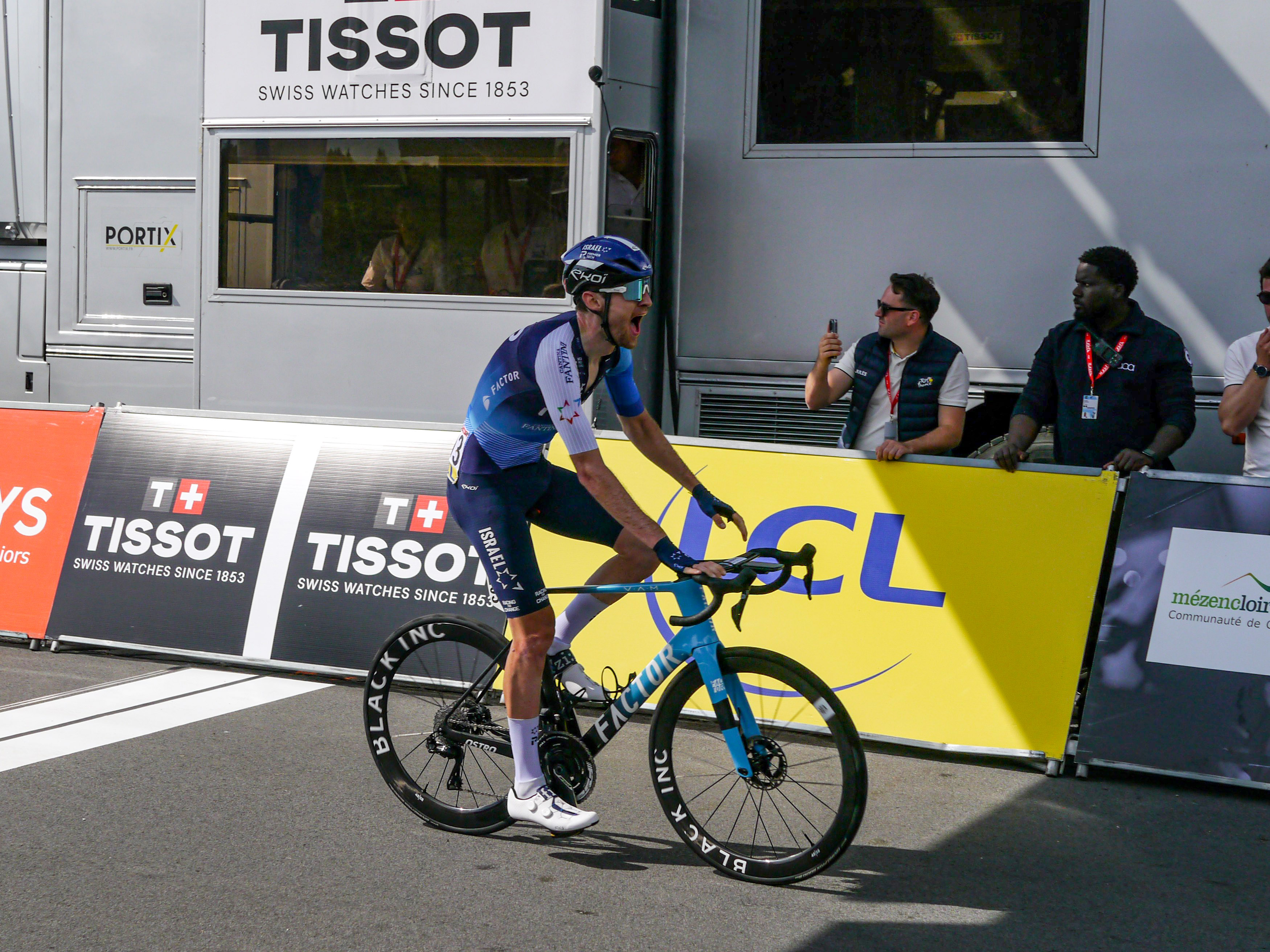
Derek Gee victory in Les Estables.

Stage 3 Result
Rank	Rider	Team	Time
1	Derek Gee (CAN)	Israel–Premier Tech	4h 22' 18"
2	Romain Grégoire (FRA)	Groupama–FDJ	+ 0"
3	Lukas Nerurkar (GBR)	EF Education–EasyPost	+ 3"
4	Giulio Ciccone (ITA)	Lidl–Trek	+ 3"
5	Harold Tejada (COL)	Astana Qazaqstan Team	+ 3"
6	Santiago Buitrago (COL)	Team Bahrain Victorious	+ 3"
7	Aleksandr Vlasov	Bora–Hansgrohe	+ 3"
8	Clément Champoussin (FRA)	Arkéa–B&B Hotels	+ 3"
9	Matteo Jorgenson (USA)	Visma–Lease a Bike	+ 3"
10	Primož Roglič (SLO)	Bora–Hansgrohe	+ 3"

General classification after Stage 3
Rank	Rider	Team	Time
1	Derek Gee (CAN)	Israel–Premier Tech	11h 45' 20"
2	Magnus Cort (DEN)	Uno-X Mobility	+ 3"
3	Romain Grégoire (FRA)	Groupama–FDJ	+ 4"
4	Primož Roglič (SLO)	Bora–Hansgrohe	+ 7"
5	Matteo Jorgenson (USA)	Visma–Lease a Bike	+ 9"
6	Lukas Nerurkar (GBR)	EF Education–EasyPost	+ 9"
7	Bruno Armirail (FRA)	Decathlon–AG2R La Mondiale	+ 11"
8	Clément Champoussin (FRA)	Arkéa–B&B Hotels	+ 13"
9	Giulio Ciccone (ITA)	Lidl–Trek	+ 13"
10	Carlos Rodríguez (ESP)	INEOS Grenadiers	+ 13"

=== Stage 4 ===
5 June 2024 – Saint-Germain-Laval to Neulise (ITT), 34.4 km (21.4 mi)

Stage 4 Result
Rank	Rider	Team	Time
1	Remco Evenepoel (BEL)	Soudal–Quick-Step	41' 49"
2	Joshua Tarling (GBR)	INEOS Grenadiers	+ 17"
3	Primož Roglič (SLO)	Bora–Hansgrohe	+ 39"
4	Matteo Jorgenson (USA)	Visma–Lease a Bike	+ 1' 08"
5	Oier Lazkano (ESP)	Movistar Team	+ 1' 21"
6	Derek Gee (CAN)	Israel–Premier Tech	+ 1' 24"
7	Neilson Powless (USA)	EF Education–EasyPost	+ 1' 25"
8	Bruno Armirail (FRA)	Decathlon–AG2R La Mondiale	+ 1' 27"
9	Juan Ayuso (ESP)	UAE Team Emirates	+ 1' 27"
10	Tao Geoghegan Hart (GBR)	Lidl–Trek	+ 1' 39"

General classification after Stage 4
Rank	Rider	Team	Time
1	Remco Evenepoel (BEL)	Soudal–Quick-Step	12h 27' 22"
2	Primož Roglič (SLO)	Bora–Hansgrohe	+ 33"
3	Matteo Jorgenson (USA)	Visma–Lease a Bike	+ 1' 04"
4	Derek Gee (CAN)	Israel–Premier Tech	+ 1' 11"
5	Oier Lazkano (ESP)	Movistar Team	+ 1' 21"
6	Bruno Armirail (FRA)	Decathlon–AG2R La Mondiale	+ 1' 25"
7	Neilson Powless (USA)	EF Education–EasyPost	+ 1' 25"
8	Juan Ayuso (ESP)	UAE Team Emirates	+ 1' 27"
9	Tao Geoghegan Hart (GBR)	Lidl–Trek	+ 1' 39"
10	Carlos Rodríguez (ESP)	INEOS Grenadiers	+ 1' 41"

=== Stage 5 ===
6 June 2024 – Amplepuis to Saint-Priest, 167 km (104 mi)

Stage neutralized due to crash.

=== Stage 6 ===
7 June 2024 – Hauterives to Le Collet d'Allevard, 174.1 km (108.2 mi)

Stage 6 Result
Rank	Rider	Team	Time
1	Primož Roglič (SLO)	Bora–Hansgrohe	4h 19' 59"
2	Giulio Ciccone (ITA)	Lidl–Trek	+ 3"
3	Aleksandr Vlasov	Bora–Hansgrohe	+ 11"
4	Derek Gee (CAN)	Israel–Premier Tech	+ 13"
5	Matteo Jorgenson (USA)	Visma–Lease a Bike	+ 17"
6	Laurens De Plus (BEL)	INEOS Grenadiers	+ 22"
7	Carlos Rodríguez (ESP)	INEOS Grenadiers	+ 22"
8	Remco Evenepoel (BEL)	Soudal–Quick-Step	+ 42"
9	Jack Haig (AUS)	Team Bahrain Victorious	+ 50"
10	Jai Hindley (AUS)	Bora–Hansgrohe	+ 53"

General classification after Stage 6
Rank	Rider	Team	Time
1	Primož Roglič (SLO)	Bora–Hansgrohe	16h 47' 44"
2	Remco Evenepoel (BEL)	Soudal–Quick-Step	+ 19"
3	Matteo Jorgenson (USA)	Visma–Lease a Bike	+ 58"
4	Derek Gee (CAN)	Israel–Premier Tech	+ 1' 01"
5	Aleksandr Vlasov	Bora–Hansgrohe	+ 1' 32"
6	Carlos Rodríguez (ESP)	INEOS Grenadiers	+ 1' 40"
7	Laurens De Plus (BEL)	INEOS Grenadiers	+ 1' 53"
8	Oier Lazkano (ESP)	Movistar Team	+ 2' 08"
9	Callum Scotson (AUS)	Team Jayco–AlUla	+ 2' 15"
10	Jack Haig (AUS)	Team Bahrain Victorious	+ 2' 31"

=== Stage 7 ===
8 June 2024 – Albertville to Samoëns 1600, 155.3 km (96.5 mi)

Stage 7 Result
Rank	Rider	Team	Time
1	Primož Roglič (SLO)	Bora–Hansgrohe	4h 29' 16"
2	Matteo Jorgenson (USA)	Visma–Lease a Bike	+ 0"
3	Giulio Ciccone (ITA)	Lidl–Trek	+ 2"
4	Oier Lazkano (ESP)	Movistar Team	+ 2"
5	Derek Gee (CAN)	Israel–Premier Tech	+ 2"
6	Carlos Rodríguez (ESP)	INEOS Grenadiers	+ 8"
7	Santiago Buitrago (COL)	Team Bahrain Victorious	+ 14"
8	Laurens De Plus (BEL)	INEOS Grenadiers	+ 14"
9	Aleksandr Vlasov	Bora–Hansgrohe	+ 14"
10	Mikel Landa (ESP)	Soudal–Quick-Step	+ 33"

General classification after Stage 7
Rank	Rider	Team	Time
1	Primož Roglič (SLO)	Bora–Hansgrohe	21h 16' 50"
2	Matteo Jorgenson (USA)	Visma–Lease a Bike	+ 1' 02"
3	Derek Gee (CAN)	Israel–Premier Tech	+ 1' 13"
4	Aleksandr Vlasov	Bora–Hansgrohe	+ 1' 56"
5	Carlos Rodríguez (ESP)	INEOS Grenadiers	+ 1' 58"
6	Remco Evenepoel (BEL)	Soudal–Quick-Step	+ 2' 15"
7	Laurens De Plus (BEL)	INEOS Grenadiers	+ 2' 17"
8	Oier Lazkano (ESP)	Movistar Team	+ 2' 20"
9	Giulio Ciccone (ITA)	Lidl–Trek	+ 2' 54"
10	Mikel Landa (ESP)	Soudal–Quick-Step	+ 3' 51"

=== Stage 8 ===
9 June 2024 – Thônes to Plateau des Glières, 160.6 km (99.8 mi)

Stage 8 Result
Rank	Rider	Team	Time
1	Carlos Rodríguez (ESP)	INEOS Grenadiers	4h 18' 02"
2	Matteo Jorgenson (USA)	Visma–Lease a Bike	+ 0"
3	Derek Gee (CAN)	Israel–Premier Tech	+ 15"
4	Laurens De Plus (BEL)	INEOS Grenadiers	+ 35"
5	Santiago Buitrago (COL)	Team Bahrain Victorious	+ 35"
6	Primož Roglič (SLO)	Bora–Hansgrohe	+ 48"
7	Giulio Ciccone (ITA)	Lidl–Trek	+ 48"
8	Remco Evenepoel (BEL)	Soudal–Quick-Step	+ 58"
9	Aleksandr Vlasov	Bora–Hansgrohe	+ 58"
10	Mikel Landa (ESP)	Soudal–Quick-Step	+ 1' 10"

General classification after Stage 8
Rank	Rider	Team	Time
1	Primož Roglič (SLO)	Bora–Hansgrohe	25h 35' 40"
2	Matteo Jorgenson (USA)	Visma–Lease a Bike	+ 8"
3	Derek Gee (CAN)	Israel–Premier Tech	+ 36"
4	Carlos Rodríguez (ESP)	INEOS Grenadiers	+ 1' 00"
5	Laurens De Plus (BEL)	INEOS Grenadiers	+ 2' 04"
6	Aleksandr Vlasov	Bora–Hansgrohe	+ 2' 06"
7	Remco Evenepoel (BEL)	Soudal–Quick-Step	+ 2' 25"
8	Giulio Ciccone (ITA)	Lidl–Trek	+ 2' 54"
9	Oier Lazkano (ESP)	Movistar Team	+ 2' 54"
10	Mikel Landa (ESP)	Soudal–Quick-Step	+ 4' 13"

== Classification leadership table ==
Classification leadership by stage
Stage	Winner	General classification	Points classification	Mountains classification	Young rider classification	Team classification	Combativity award
1	Mads Pedersen	Mads Pedersen	Mads Pedersen	Mark Donovan	Hugo Page	Arkéa–B&B Hotels	Mark Donovan
2	Magnus Cort	Magnus Cort	Magnus Cort	Mathis Le Berre	Matteo Jorgenson	Movistar Team	Bruno Armirail
3	Derek Gee	Derek Gee	Giulio Ciccone	Mathis Le Berre	Romain Grégoire	Movistar Team	Nicolas Prodhomme
4	Remco Evenepoel	Remco Evenepoel	Primož Roglič	Mathis Le Berre	Remco Evenepoel	Bora–Hansgrohe	not awarded
5	race neutralised	Remco Evenepoel	Primož Roglič	Mathis Le Berre	Remco Evenepoel	Bora–Hansgrohe	Mathis Le Berre & Tobias Bayer
6	Primož Roglič	Primož Roglič	Primož Roglič	Mathis Le Berre	Remco Evenepoel	Bora–Hansgrohe	Romain Grégoire
7	Primož Roglič	Primož Roglič	Primož Roglič	Primož Roglič	Matteo Jorgenson	Bora–Hansgrohe	Marc Soler
8	Carlos Rodríguez	Primož Roglič	Primož Roglič	Lorenzo Fortunato	Matteo Jorgenson	Bora–Hansgrohe	Guillaume Martin
Final		Primož Roglič	Primož Roglič	Lorenzo Fortunato	Matteo Jorgenson	Bora–Hansgrohe	Not awarded

== Classification standings ==
Legend
Denotes the winner of the general classification	Denotes the winner of the young rider classification
Denotes the winner of the points classification	Denotes the winner of the team classification
Denotes the winner of the mountains classification	Denotes the winner of the combativity award

=== General classification ===
Final general classification (1–10)
Rank	Rider	Team	Time
1	Primož Roglič (SLO)	Bora–Hansgrohe	25h 35' 40"
2	Matteo Jorgenson (USA)	Visma–Lease a Bike	+ 8"
3	Derek Gee (CAN)	Israel–Premier Tech	+ 36"
4	Carlos Rodríguez (ESP)	INEOS Grenadiers	+ 1' 00"
5	Laurens De Plus (BEL)	INEOS Grenadiers	+ 2' 04"
6	Aleksandr Vlasov	Bora–Hansgrohe	+ 2' 06"
7	Remco Evenepoel (BEL)	Soudal–Quick-Step	+ 2' 25"
8	Giulio Ciccone (ITA)	Lidl–Trek	+ 2' 54"
9	Oier Lazkano (ESP)	Movistar Team	+ 2' 54"
10	Mikel Landa (ESP)	Soudal–Quick-Step	+ 4' 13"

=== Points classification ===
Final points classification (1–10)
Rank	Rider	Team	Points
1	Primož Roglič (SLO)	Bora–Hansgrohe	73
2	Matteo Jorgenson (USA)	Visma–Lease a Bike	66
3	Giulio Ciccone (ITA)	Lidl–Trek	62
4	Derek Gee (CAN)	Israel–Premier Tech	54
5	Magnus Cort (DEN)	Uno-X Mobility	41
6	Romain Grégoire (FRA)	Groupama–FDJ	34
7	Oier Lazkano (ESP)	Movistar Team	30
8	Aleksandr Vlasov	Bora–Hansgrohe	26
9	Mads Pedersen (DEN)	Lidl–Trek	25
10	Carlos Rodríguez (ESP)	INEOS Grenadiers	24

=== Mountains classification ===
Final mountains classification (1–10)
Rank	Rider	Team	Points
1	Lorenzo Fortunato (ITA)	Astana Qazaqstan Team	40
2	Marc Soler (ESP)	UAE Team Emirates	38
3	Primož Roglič (SLO)	Bora–Hansgrohe	31
4	Matteo Jorgenson (USA)	Visma–Lease a Bike	26
5	Mathis Le Berre (FRA)	Arkéa–B&B Hotels	24
6	Derek Gee (CAN)	Israel–Premier Tech	22
7	Giulio Ciccone (ITA)	Lidl–Trek	22
8	Warren Barguil (FRA)	Team dsm–firmenich PostNL	22
9	Carlos Rodríguez (ESP)	INEOS Grenadiers	19
10	Aleksandr Vlasov	Bora–Hansgrohe	13

=== Young rider classification ===
Final young rider classification (1–10)
Rank	Rider	Team	Time
1	Matteo Jorgenson (USA)	Visma–Lease a Bike	25h 35' 48"
2	Carlos Rodríguez (ESP)	INEOS Grenadiers	+ 52"
3	Remco Evenepoel (BEL)	Soudal–Quick-Step	+ 2' 17"
4	Oier Lazkano (ESP)	Movistar Team	+ 2' 46"
5	Santiago Buitrago (COL)	Team Bahrain Victorious	+ 4' 20"
6	Javier Romo (ESP)	Movistar Team	+ 5' 45"
7	Romain Grégoire (FRA)	Groupama–FDJ	+ 28' 35"
8	Darren Rafferty (IRL)	EF Education–EasyPost	+ 34' 39"
9	Alessandro Fancellu (ITA)	Q36.5 Pro Cycling Team	+ 42' 54"
10	Igor Arrieta (ESP)	UAE Team Emirates	+ 45' 07"

=== Team classification ===
Final team classification (1–10)
Rank	Team	Time
1	(Germany) Bora–Hansgrohe	77h 05' 45"
2	(United Kingdom) INEOS Grenadiers	+ 7' 01"
3	Israel–Premier Tech	+ 19' 04"
4	(Spain) Movistar Team	+ 24' 40"
5	(Netherlands) Visma–Lease a Bike	+ 33' 48"
6	(United Arab Emirates) UAE Team Emirates	+ 40' 46"
7	(France) Groupama–FDJ	+ 50' 00"
8	(Belgium) Soudal–Quick-Step	+ 53' 59"
9	Team Bahrain Victorious	+ 1h 08' 28"
10	(France) Decathlon–AG2R La Mondiale	+ 1h 19' 07"
