= 1960 Critérium du Dauphiné Libéré =

Race details
- Dates: 31 May – 6 June 1960
- Stages: 7
- Distance: 1,390 km (860 mi)
- Winning time: 40h 08' 38"

Results
	Winner	Jean Dotto (FRA)	(Liberia–Grammont)
	Second	Raymond Mastrotto (FRA)	(Rapha–Gitane–Dunlop)
	Third	Gérard Thiélin (FRA)	(Rapha–Gitane–Dunlop)
	Points	Robert Cazala (FRA)	(Mercier–BP–Hutchinson)
	Mountains	Jean Dotto (FRA)	(Liberia–Grammont)

The 1960 Critérium du Dauphiné Libéré was the 14th edition of the cycle race and was held from 31 May to 6 June 1960. The race started in Valence and finished in Grenoble. The race was won by Jean Dotto of the Liberia team.

== General classification ==
Final general classification

Rank	Rider	Team	Time
1	Jean Dotto (FRA)	Liberia–Grammont	40h 08' 38"
2	Raymond Mastrotto (FRA)	Rapha–Gitane–Dunlop	+ 1' 46"
3	Gérard Thiélin (FRA)	Rapha–Gitane–Dunlop	+ 7' 11"
4	Eddy Pauwels (BEL)	Dr. Mann–Dossche Sport	+ 8' 29"
5	René Privat (FRA)	Mercier–BP–Hutchinson	+ 13' 16"
6	Antoine Abate (FRA)	International	+ 13' 16"
7	Robert Cazala (FRA)	Mercier–BP–Hutchinson	+ 15' 14"
8	René Pavard (FRA)	Helyett–Leroux–Fynsec–Hutchinson	+ 15' 26"
9	Stéphane Lach (FRA)	Peugeot–BP–Dunlop	+ 16' 10"
10	Raymond Poulidor (FRA)	Mercier–BP–Hutchinson	+ 16' 10"
