= 2011 Critérium du Dauphiné =

2011 UCI World Tour, race 15 of 27
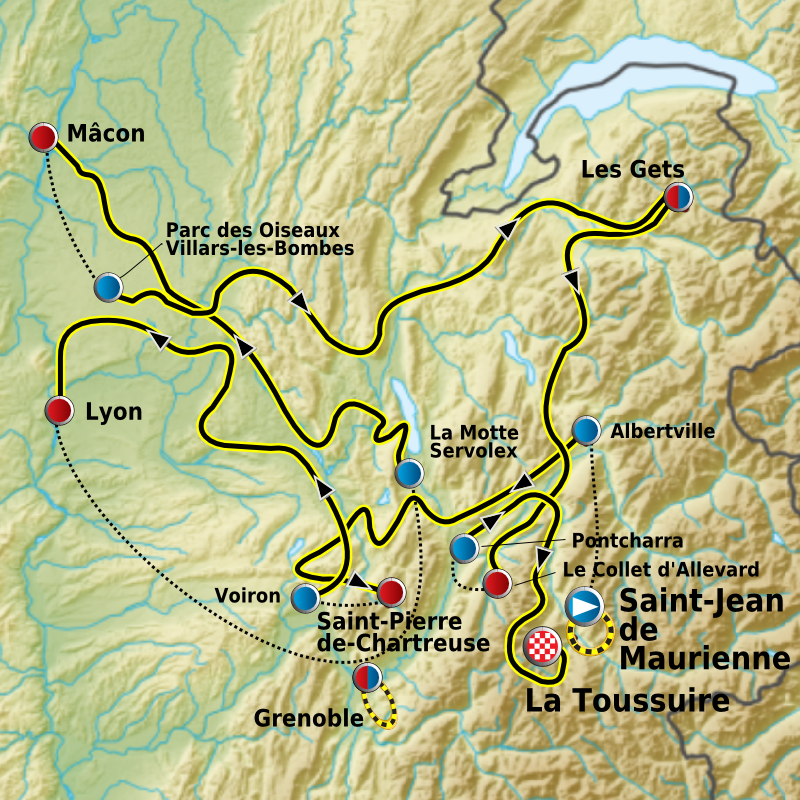
- The route of the 2011 Critérium du Dauphiné

Race details
- Dates: 5–12 June 2011
- Stages: 7+prologue
- Distance: 1,064.4 km (661.4 mi)
- Winning time: 26h 40' 51"

Results
| Jersey awarded to the overall winner | Winner | Bradley Wiggins (GBR) | (Team Sky) |
| | Second | Cadel Evans (AUS) | (BMC Racing Team) |
| | Third | Alexander Vinokourov (KAZ) | (Astana) |
| Jersey awarded to the points classification winner | Points | Joaquim Rodríguez (ESP) | (Team Katusha) |
| Jersey awarded to the mountains classification winner | Mountains | Joaquim Rodríguez (ESP) | (Team Katusha) |
| Jersey awarded to the young rider classification winner | Young rider | Jérôme Coppel (FRA) | (Saur–Sojasun) |
| | Team | Team Europcar | |

The 2011 Critérium du Dauphiné, was the 63rd running of the Critérium du Dauphiné (formerly Critérium du Dauphiné Libéré) cycling stage race. It started on 5 June in Saint-Jean-de-Maurienne and ended on 12 June in La Toussuire and consisted of eight stages, including a race-commencing prologue stage and an individual time trial, held as the third stage. It was the 15th race of the 2011 UCI World Tour season.

The race was won by Team Sky rider Bradley Wiggins, who claimed the leader's yellow and blue jersey after a strong finish on the individual time trial stage, and maintained his advantage to the end of the race. Wiggins' winning margin over runner-up Cadel Evans of BMC Racing Team was 1 minute and 26 seconds, and Astana's Alexander Vinokourov completed the podium, 23 seconds down on Evans.

In the race's other classifications, Team Katusha rider Joaquim Rodríguez won both the King of the Mountains classification, and the green jersey for the points classification, Saur–Sojasun's Jérôme Coppel won the young rider classification, with Team Europcar finishing at the head of the teams classification.

== Teams ==
Twenty-two teams, each containing up to eight riders, started the race:

- Ag2r–La Mondiale
- BMC Racing Team
- Cofidis
- Euskaltel–Euskadi
- FDJ
- HTC–Highroad
- Team Katusha
- Lampre–ISD
- Liquigas–Cannondale
- Movistar Team
- Omega Pharma–Lotto
- Astana
- Quick-Step
- Rabobank
- Saur–Sojasun
- Saxo Bank–SunGard
- Team Sky
- Team Europcar
- Garmin–Cervélo
- Leopard Trek
- Team RadioShack
- Vacansoleil–DCM

== Pre-race favourites ==
The winner of the 2010 Critérium du Dauphiné, Janez Brajkovič, was looking to defend last year's victory, while other pre-race favourites like Tirreno–Adriatico and Tour de Romandie winner, Cadel Evans, as well as Ivan Basso, Robert Gesink, Samuel Sánchez, Alexander Vinokourov and Bradley Wiggins used the race as a trial-run for the Tour de France.

== Route ==
Stage characteristics and winners
| Stage | Date | Course | Distance | Type | Winner |
|---|---|---|---|---|---|
| P | 5 June | Saint-Jean-de-Maurienne | 5.4 km (3.4 mi) | Individual time trial | Lars Boom (NED) |
| 1 | 6 June | Albertville to Saint-Pierre-de-Chartreuse | 144 km (89 mi) | Medium mountain stage | Jurgen Van den Broeck (BEL) |
| 2 | 7 June | Voiron to Lyon | 179 km (111 mi) | Flat stage | John Degenkolb (GER) |
| 3 | 8 June | Grenoble | 42.5 km (26.4 mi) | Individual time trial | Tony Martin (GER) |
| 4 | 9 June | La Motte-Servolex to Mâcon | 173.5 km (107.8 mi) | Flat stage | John Degenkolb (GER) |
| 5 | 10 June | Parc des Oiseaux – Villars-les-Dombes to Les Gets | 210 km (130 mi) | Medium mountain stage | Christophe Kern (FRA) |
| 6 | 11 June | Les Gets to Le Collet d'Allevard | 192.5 km (119.6 mi) | High mountain stage | Joaquim Rodríguez (ESP) |
| 7 | 12 June | Pontcharra to La Toussuire | 117.5 km (73.0 mi) | High mountain stage | Joaquim Rodríguez (ESP) |

== Stages ==
=== Prologue ===
5 June 2011 – Saint-Jean-de-Maurienne, 5.4 km (3.4 mi) individual time trial (ITT)

Prologue Result and General Classification after Prologue

| | Rider | Team | Time |
|---|---|---|---|
| 1 | Lars Boom (NED) | Rabobank | 6' 18" |
| 2 | Alexander Vinokourov (KAZ) | Astana | + 2" |
| 3 | Bradley Wiggins (GBR) | Team Sky | + 5" |
| 4 | John Degenkolb (GER) | HTC–Highroad | + 6" |
| 5 | Blel Kadri (FRA) | Ag2r–La Mondiale | + 8" |
| 6 | Joost Posthuma (NED) | Leopard Trek | + 9" |
| 7 | Cadel Evans (AUS) | BMC Racing Team | + 9" |
| 8 | Christophe Riblon (FRA) | Ag2r–La Mondiale | + 9" |
| 9 | Cyril Lemoine (FRA) | Saur–Sojasun | + 10" |
| 10 | Jérôme Coppel (FRA) | Saur–Sojasun | + 11" |

=== Stage 1 ===
6 June 2011 – Albertville to Saint-Pierre-de-Chartreuse, 144 km (89 mi)

Stage 1 Result

| | Rider | Team | Time |
|---|---|---|---|
| 1 | Jurgen Van den Broeck (BEL) | Omega Pharma–Lotto | 3h 36' 42" |
| 2 | Joaquim Rodríguez (ESP) | Team Katusha | + 6" |
| 3 | Cadel Evans (AUS) | BMC Racing Team | + 7" |
| 4 | Alexander Vinokourov (KAZ) | Astana | + 7" |
| 5 | Nicolas Roche (IRL) | Ag2r–La Mondiale | + 7" |
| 6 | Edvald Boasson Hagen (NOR) | Team Sky | + 7" |
| 7 | Thibaut Pinot (FRA) | FDJ | + 13" |
| 8 | Rob Ruijgh (NED) | Vacansoleil–DCM | + 13" |
| 9 | Thomas Voeckler (FRA) | Team Europcar | + 15" |
| 10 | Janez Brajkovič (SLO) | Team RadioShack | + 15" |

General Classification after Stage 1

| | Rider | Team | Time |
|---|---|---|---|
| 1 | Alexander Vinokourov (KAZ) | Astana | 3h 43' 09" |
| 2 | Jurgen Van den Broeck (BEL) | Omega Pharma–Lotto | + 5" |
| 3 | Cadel Evans (AUS) | BMC Racing Team | + 7" |
| 4 | Bradley Wiggins (GBR) | Team Sky | + 11" |
| 5 | Edvald Boasson Hagen (NOR) | Team Sky | + 13" |
| 6 | Nicolas Roche (IRL) | Ag2r–La Mondiale | + 17" |
| 7 | Janez Brajkovič (SLO) | Team RadioShack | + 20" |
| 8 | Joaquim Rodríguez (ESP) | Team Katusha | + 23" |
| 9 | Thibaut Pinot (FRA) | FDJ | + 24" |
| 10 | Thomas Voeckler (FRA) | Team Europcar | + 27" |

=== Stage 2 ===
7 June 2011 – Voiron to Lyon, 179 km (111 mi)

Stage 2 Result

| | Rider | Team | Time |
|---|---|---|---|
| 1 | John Degenkolb (GER) | HTC–Highroad | 4h 02' 39" |
| 2 | Samuel Dumoulin (FRA) | Cofidis | s.t. |
| 3 | Sébastien Hinault (FRA) | Ag2r–La Mondiale | s.t. |
| 4 | Paul Martens (GER) | Rabobank | s.t. |
| 5 | Joaquim Rodríguez (ESP) | Team Katusha | s.t. |
| 6 | Thomas Voeckler (FRA) | Team Europcar | s.t. |
| 7 | Jelle Vanendert (BEL) | Omega Pharma–Lotto | s.t. |
| 8 | Grega Bole (SLO) | Lampre–ISD | s.t. |
| 9 | Nicolas Roche (IRL) | Ag2r–La Mondiale | s.t. |
| 10 | Fabian Wegmann (GER) | Leopard Trek | s.t. |

General Classification after Stage 2

| | Rider | Team | Time |
|---|---|---|---|
| 1 | Alexander Vinokourov (KAZ) | Astana | 7h 45' 48" |
| 2 | Jurgen Van den Broeck (BEL) | Omega Pharma–Lotto | + 11" |
| 3 | Bradley Wiggins (GBR) | Team Sky | + 11" |
| 4 | Cadel Evans (AUS) | BMC Racing Team | + 13" |
| 5 | Nicolas Roche (IRL) | Ag2r–La Mondiale | + 17" |
| 6 | Joaquim Rodríguez (ESP) | Team Katusha | + 23" |
| 7 | Janez Brajkovič (SLO) | Team RadioShack | + 26" |
| 8 | Thomas Voeckler (FRA) | Team Europcar | + 27" |
| 9 | Rob Ruijgh (NED) | Vacansoleil–DCM | + 29" |
| 10 | Rui Costa (POR) | Movistar Team | + 34" |

=== Stage 3 ===
8 June 2011 – Grenoble, 42.5 km (26.4 mi) individual time trial (ITT)

Stage 3 Result

| | Rider | Team | Time |
|---|---|---|---|
| 1 | Tony Martin (GER) | HTC–Highroad | 55' 27" |
| 2 | Bradley Wiggins (GBR) | Team Sky | + 11" |
| 3 | Edvald Boasson Hagen (NOR) | Team Sky | + 43" |
| 4 | David Zabriskie (USA) | Garmin–Cervélo | + 58" |
| 5 | Janez Brajkovič (SLO) | Team RadioShack | + 1' 17" |
| 6 | Cadel Evans (AUS) | BMC Racing Team | + 1' 20" |
| 7 | Geraint Thomas (GBR) | Team Sky | + 1' 36" |
| 8 | Christophe Riblon (FRA) | Ag2r–La Mondiale | + 1' 37" |
| 9 | Rein Taaramäe (EST) | Cofidis | + 1' 56" |
| 10 | Rui Costa (POR) | Movistar Team | + 2' 00" |

General Classification after Stage 3

| | Rider | Team | Time |
|---|---|---|---|
| 1 | Bradley Wiggins (GBR) | Team Sky | 8h 41' 37" |
| 2 | Cadel Evans (AUS) | BMC Racing Team | + 1' 11" |
| 3 | Janez Brajkovič (SLO) | Team RadioShack | + 1' 21" |
| 4 | Alexander Vinokourov (KAZ) | Astana | + 1' 56" |
| 5 | Rui Costa (POR) | Movistar Team | + 2' 12" |
| 6 | Geraint Thomas (GBR) | Team Sky | + 2' 25" |
| 7 | Jurgen Van den Broeck (BEL) | Omega Pharma–Lotto | + 2' 28" |
| 8 | Christophe Riblon (FRA) | Ag2r–La Mondiale | + 2' 45" |
| 9 | Ben Hermans (BEL) | Team RadioShack | + 2' 46" |
| 10 | Jérôme Coppel (FRA) | Saur–Sojasun | + 2' 52" |

=== Stage 4 ===
9 June 2011 – La Motte-Servolex to Mâcon, 173.5 km (107.8 mi)

Stage 4 Result

| | Rider | Team | Time |
|---|---|---|---|
| 1 | John Degenkolb (GER) | HTC–Highroad | 4h 15' 41" |
| 2 | Edvald Boasson Hagen (NOR) | Team Sky | s.t. |
| 3 | Juan José Haedo (ARG) | Saxo Bank–SunGard | s.t. |
| 4 | Tomas Vaitkus (LTU) | Astana | s.t. |
| 5 | William Bonnet (FRA) | FDJ | s.t. |
| 6 | Tyler Farrar (USA) | Garmin–Cervélo | s.t. |
| 7 | Marco Bandiera (ITA) | Quick-Step | s.t. |
| 8 | Samuel Dumoulin (FRA) | Cofidis | s.t. |
| 9 | Pim Ligthart (NED) | Vacansoleil–DCM | s.t. |
| 10 | Kenny Dehaes (BEL) | Omega Pharma–Lotto | s.t. |

General Classification after Stage 4

| | Rider | Team | Time |
|---|---|---|---|
| 1 | Bradley Wiggins (GBR) | Team Sky | 12h 57' 18" |
| 2 | Cadel Evans (AUS) | BMC Racing Team | + 1' 11" |
| 3 | Janez Brajkovič (SLO) | Team RadioShack | + 1' 21" |
| 4 | Alexander Vinokourov (KAZ) | Astana | + 1' 56" |
| 5 | Rui Costa (POR) | Movistar Team | + 2' 12" |
| 6 | Geraint Thomas (GBR) | Team Sky | + 2' 25" |
| 7 | Jurgen Van den Broeck (BEL) | Omega Pharma–Lotto | + 2' 28" |
| 8 | Christophe Riblon (FRA) | Ag2r–La Mondiale | + 2' 45" |
| 9 | Ben Hermans (BEL) | Team RadioShack | + 2' 46" |
| 10 | Jérôme Coppel (FRA) | Saur–Sojasun | + 2' 52" |

=== Stage 5 ===
10 June 2011 – Parc des Oiseaux – Villars-les-Dombes to Les Gets, 210 km (130 mi)

Stage 5 Result

| | Rider | Team | Time |
|---|---|---|---|
| 1 | Christophe Kern (FRA) | Team Europcar | 5h 05' 03" |
| 2 | Chris Anker Sørensen (DEN) | Saxo Bank–SunGard | + 7" |
| 3 | Thomas Voeckler (FRA) | Team Europcar | + 9" |
| 4 | Joaquim Rodríguez (ESP) | Team Katusha | + 9" |
| 5 | Alexander Vinokourov (KAZ) | Astana | + 9" |
| 6 | Bradley Wiggins (GBR) | Team Sky | + 9" |
| 7 | Thibaut Pinot (FRA) | FDJ | + 9" |
| 8 | Dan Martin (IRL) | Garmin–Cervélo | + 9" |
| 9 | Jurgen Van den Broeck (BEL) | Omega Pharma–Lotto | + 9" |
| 10 | Ben Hermans (BEL) | Team RadioShack | + 9" |

General Classification after Stage 5

| | Rider | Team | Time |
|---|---|---|---|
| 1 | Bradley Wiggins (GBR) | Team Sky | 18h 02' 30" |
| 2 | Cadel Evans (AUS) | BMC Racing Team | + 1' 11" |
| 3 | Janez Brajkovič (SLO) | Team RadioShack | + 1' 21" |
| 4 | Alexander Vinokourov (KAZ) | Astana | + 1' 56" |
| 5 | Rui Costa (POR) | Movistar Team | + 2' 22" |
| 6 | Jurgen Van den Broeck (BEL) | Omega Pharma–Lotto | + 2' 28" |
| 7 | Christophe Riblon (FRA) | Ag2r–La Mondiale | + 2' 45" |
| 8 | Ben Hermans (BEL) | Team RadioShack | + 2' 46" |
| 9 | Jérôme Coppel (FRA) | Saur–Sojasun | + 2' 52" |
| 10 | Kanstantsin Sivtsov (BLR) | HTC–Highroad | + 2' 52" |

=== Stage 6 ===
11 June 2011 – Les Gets to Le Collet d'Allevard, 192.5 km (119.6 mi)

Stage 6 Result

| | Rider | Team | Time |
|---|---|---|---|
| 1 | Joaquim Rodríguez (ESP) | Team Katusha | 5h 12' 47" |
| 2 | Robert Gesink (NED) | Rabobank | + 31" |
| 3 | Jurgen Van den Broeck (BEL) | Omega Pharma–Lotto | + 39" |
| 4 | Christophe Kern (FRA) | Team Europcar | + 41" |
| 5 | Alexander Vinokourov (KAZ) | Astana | + 50" |
| 6 | Bradley Wiggins (GBR) | Team Sky | + 54" |
| 7 | Chris Anker Sørensen (DEN) | Saxo Bank–SunGard | + 1' 00" |
| 8 | Jean-Christophe Péraud (FRA) | Ag2r–La Mondiale | + 1' 06" |
| 9 | Cadel Evans (AUS) | BMC Racing Team | + 1' 09" |
| 10 | Thomas Voeckler (FRA) | Team Europcar | + 1' 58" |

General Classification after Stage 6

| | Rider | Team | Time |
|---|---|---|---|
| 1 | Bradley Wiggins (GBR) | Team Sky | 23h 16' 11" |
| 2 | Cadel Evans (AUS) | BMC Racing Team | + 1' 26" |
| 3 | Alexander Vinokourov (KAZ) | Astana | + 1' 52" |
| 4 | Jurgen Van den Broeck (BEL) | Omega Pharma–Lotto | + 2' 13" |
| 5 | Christophe Kern (FRA) | Team Europcar | + 2' 52" |
| 6 | Joaquim Rodríguez (ESP) | Team Katusha | + 3' 01" |
| 7 | Jean-Christophe Péraud (FRA) | Ag2r–La Mondiale | + 3' 30" |
| 8 | Kanstantsin Sivtsov (BLR) | HTC–Highroad | + 4' 14" |
| 9 | Janez Brajkovič (SLO) | Team RadioShack | + 4' 22" |
| 10 | Thomas Voeckler (FRA) | Team Europcar | + 4' 27" |

=== Stage 7 ===
12 June 2011 – Pontcharra to La Toussuire, 117.5 km (73.0 mi)

Stage 7 Result

| | Rider | Team | Time |
|---|---|---|---|
| 1 | Joaquim Rodríguez (ESP) | Team Katusha | 3h 24' 30" |
| 2 | Thibaut Pinot (FRA) | FDJ | + 7" |
| 3 | Robert Gesink (NED) | Rabobank | + 7" |
| 4 | Jurgen Van den Broeck (BEL) | Omega Pharma–Lotto | + 7" |
| 5 | Alexander Vinokourov (KAZ) | Astana | + 7" |
| 6 | Chris Anker Sørensen (DEN) | Saxo Bank–SunGard | + 10" |
| 7 | Cadel Evans (AUS) | BMC Racing Team | + 10" |
| 8 | Kanstantsin Sivtsov (BLR) | HTC–Highroad | + 10" |
| 9 | Janez Brajkovič (SLO) | Team RadioShack | + 10" |
| 10 | Bradley Wiggins (GBR) | Team Sky | + 10" |

Final General Classification

| | Rider | Team | Time |
|---|---|---|---|
| 1 | Bradley Wiggins (GBR) | Team Sky | 26h 40' 51" |
| 2 | Cadel Evans (AUS) | BMC Racing Team | + 1' 26" |
| 3 | Alexander Vinokourov (KAZ) | Astana | + 1' 49" |
| 4 | Jurgen Van den Broeck (BEL) | Omega Pharma–Lotto | + 2' 10" |
| 5 | Joaquim Rodríguez (ESP) | Team Katusha | + 2' 51" |
| 6 | Christophe Kern (FRA) | Team Europcar | + 3' 05" |
| 7 | Jean-Christophe Péraud (FRA) | Ag2r–La Mondiale | + 3' 30" |
| 8 | Kanstantsin Sivtsov (BLR) | HTC–Highroad | + 4' 14" |
| 9 | Janez Brajkovič (SLO) | Team RadioShack | + 4' 22" |
| 10 | Thomas Voeckler (FRA) | Team Europcar | + 4' 31" |

== Classification leadership ==
| Stage | Winner | General classification | Mountains classification | Points classification | Young rider classification | Team Classification |
|---|---|---|---|---|---|---|
| P | Lars Boom | Lars Boom | Sébastien Hinault | Lars Boom | John Degenkolb | Rabobank |
| 1 | Jurgen Van den Broeck | Alexander Vinokourov | Jurgen Van den Broeck | Alexander Vinokourov | Edvald Boasson Hagen | Team Sky |
| 2 | John Degenkolb | Alexander Vinokourov | Jurgen Van den Broeck | Joaquim Rodríguez | Rob Ruijgh | Team Sky |
| 3 | Tony Martin | Bradley Wiggins | Jurgen Van den Broeck | Bradley Wiggins | Rui Costa | Team Sky |
| 4 | John Degenkolb | Bradley Wiggins | Leonardo Duque | John Degenkolb | Rui Costa | Team Sky |
| 5 | Christophe Kern | Bradley Wiggins | Leonardo Duque | John Degenkolb | Rui Costa | Ag2r–La Mondiale |
| 6 | Joaquim Rodríguez | Bradley Wiggins | Leonardo Duque | Joaquim Rodríguez | Jérôme Coppel | Ag2r–La Mondiale |
| 7 | Joaquim Rodríguez | Bradley Wiggins | Joaquim Rodríguez | Joaquim Rodríguez | Jérôme Coppel | Team Europcar |
| Final | | Bradley Wiggins | Joaquim Rodríguez | Joaquim Rodríguez | Jérôme Coppel | Team Europcar |
