= La Chamba =

- Commune
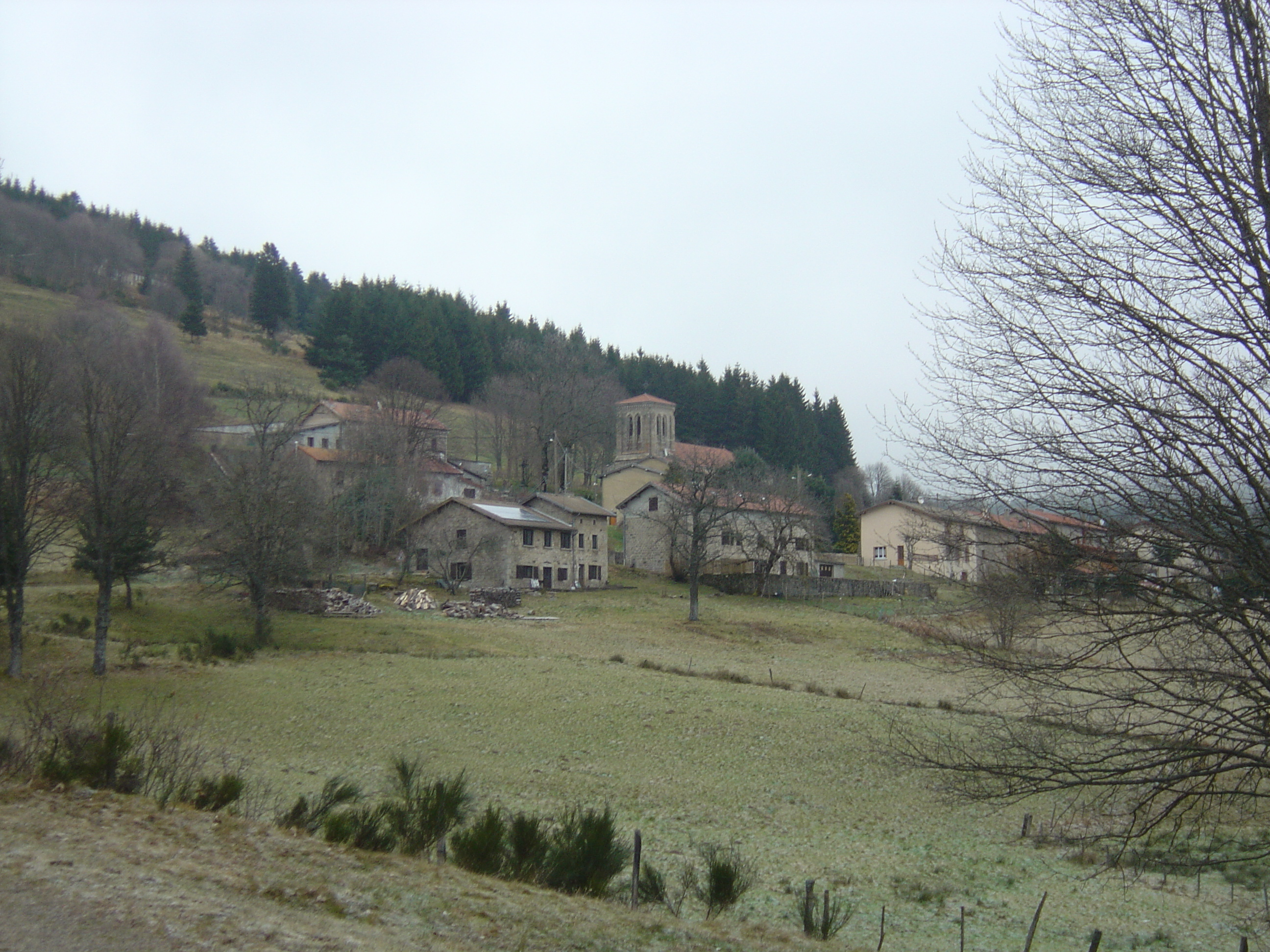

- Coat of arms
- Location of La Chamba
- Location within France Location within Auvergne-Rhône-Alpes
- Coordinates: 45°45′22″N 3°45′30″E
- Country: France
- Region: Auvergne-Rhône-Alpes
- Department: Loire
- Arrondissement: Montbrison
- Canton: Boën-sur-Lignon
- Intercommunality: CA Loire Forez

Government
  - Mayor (2020–2026): Valerie Halvick
- Area^{1}: 5.2 km^{2} (2.0 sq mi)
- Elevation: 1,087 m (3,566 ft)
- Highest elevation: 1,344 m (4,409 ft)
- Lowest elevation: 983 m (3,225 ft)
- Population (2023): 42
  - Density: 8.1/km^{2} (21/sq mi)
- Time zone: UTC+01:00 (CET)
  - Summer (DST): UTC+02:00 (CEST)
- INSEE/Postal code: 42040 /42440
- ^{1} French Land Register data, which excludes lakes, ponds, glaciers > 1 km^{2} (0.386 sq mi or 247 acres) and river estuaries.

La Chamba (French pronunciation: [la ʃɑ̃ba]; Occitan: La Chambaa) is a commune in the Loire department in central France.

== Climate ==
Climate data for La Chamba (Col de la Loge), 1261m (1991−2020 normals, 1997−2024 extremes)
Month	Jan	Feb	Mar	Apr	May	Jun	Jul	Aug	Sep	Oct	Nov	Dec	Year
Record high °C (°F)	18.5 (65.3)	19.4 (66.9)	21.2 (70.2)	23.7 (74.7)	26.1 (79.0)	32.6 (90.7)	31.8 (89.2)	32.9 (91.2)	28.0 (82.4)	25.6 (78.1)	21.4 (70.5)	16.5 (61.7)	32.9 (91.2)
Mean daily maximum °C (°F)	2.6 (36.7)	3.1 (37.6)	6.4 (43.5)	9.8 (49.6)	13.7 (56.7)	18.0 (64.4)	19.8 (67.6)	19.9 (67.8)	15.9 (60.6)	11.8 (53.2)	6.0 (42.8)	3.6 (38.5)	10.9 (51.6)
Daily mean °C (°F)	−0.2 (31.6)	0.0 (32.0)	2.9 (37.2)	5.8 (42.4)	9.5 (49.1)	13.5 (56.3)	15.2 (59.4)	15.4 (59.7)	11.9 (53.4)	8.5 (47.3)	3.3 (37.9)	0.9 (33.6)	7.2 (45.0)
Mean daily minimum °C (°F)	−3.0 (26.6)	−3.1 (26.4)	−0.6 (30.9)	1.8 (35.2)	5.4 (41.7)	9.1 (48.4)	10.6 (51.1)	11.0 (51.8)	8.0 (46.4)	5.1 (41.2)	0.5 (32.9)	−1.9 (28.6)	3.6 (38.4)
Record low °C (°F)	−15.3 (4.5)	−19.1 (−2.4)	−16.5 (2.3)	−8.9 (16.0)	−4.4 (24.1)	−0.9 (30.4)	2.5 (36.5)	1.8 (35.2)	−1.0 (30.2)	−9.9 (14.2)	−14.1 (6.6)	−17.3 (0.9)	−19.1 (−2.4)
Average precipitation mm (inches)	100.9 (3.97)	85.6 (3.37)	92.0 (3.62)	95.5 (3.76)	123.6 (4.87)	102.2 (4.02)	107.4 (4.23)	116.0 (4.57)	91.7 (3.61)	112.9 (4.44)	126.4 (4.98)	119.2 (4.69)	1,273.4 (50.13)
Average precipitation days	13.6	12.5	12.5	12.7	13.4	10.8	11.3	10.7	9.6	12.0	13.9	14.6	147.7
Source: Meteociel

== Population ==
Historical population
Year	Pop.	±% p.a.
1968	87	—
1975	81	−1.02%
1982	68	−2.47%
1990	56	−2.40%
1999	53	−0.61%
2007	57	+0.91%
2012	51	−2.20%
2017	50	−0.40%
2023	42	−2.86%
Source: INSEE

== Heraldry ==
La Chamba	Azure, a mount of Tenné charged, on the dexter side with a roe deer contourné or, on the sinister side with a cross-country skier argent on an isolated and reduced terrace of the same, in base with a fir tree vert, the topped with snow argent and charged with a bunch of blueberries stemmed and leaved proper, surmounted by a scroll or charged with the inscription "LA CHAMBA" in capital letters sable.

== See also ==
- Communes of the Loire department
