= Col de la Loge =

Mountain pass in the Massif Central

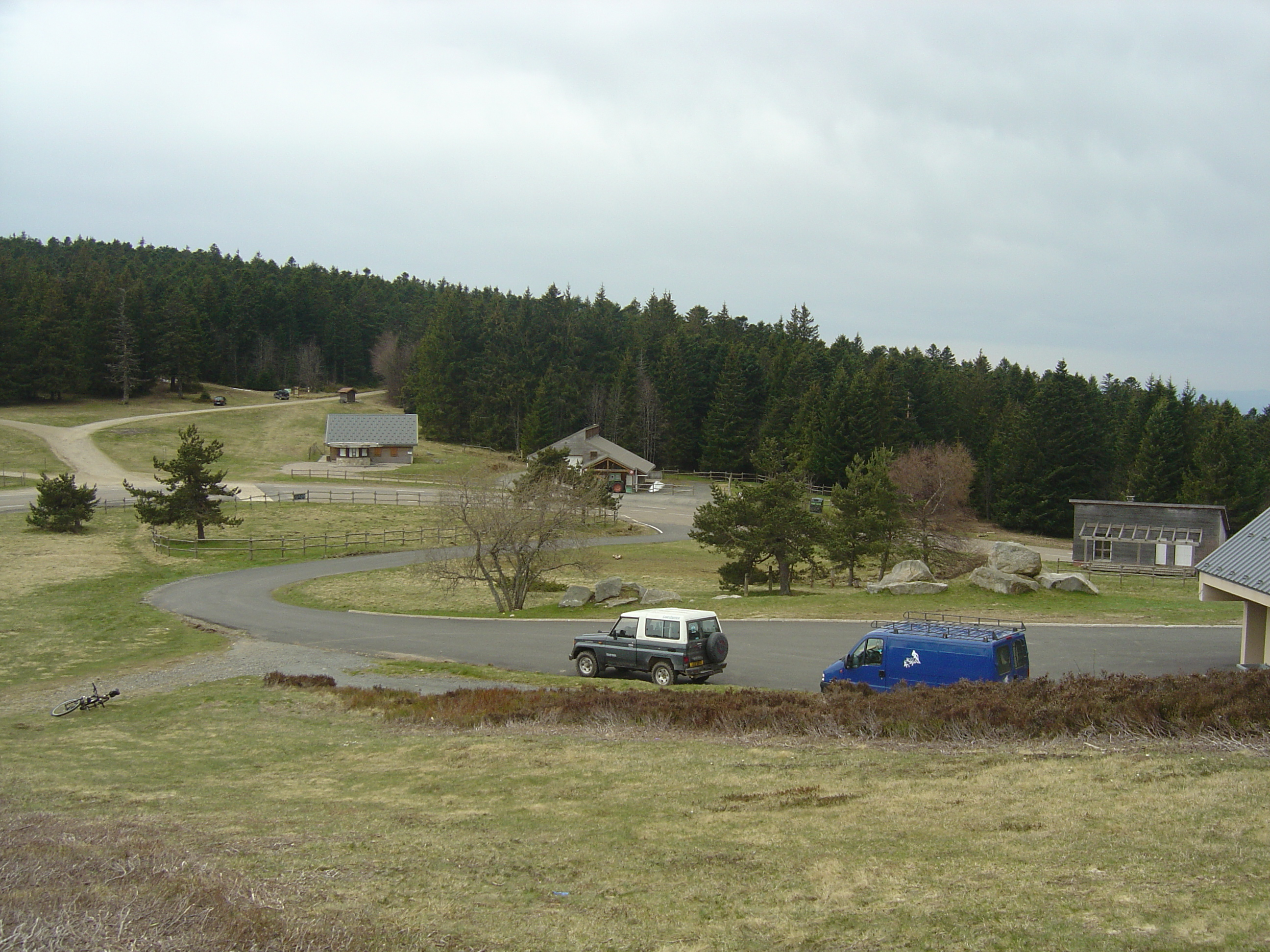
- A view of the Col de la Loge

- Location within France Location within Auvergne-Rhône-Alpes
- Elevation: 1,253 metres (4,111 ft)
- Traversed by: D101 road

Third Approach
- Location: Loire, Auvergne-Rhône-Alpes, France
- Range: Massif Central
- Coordinates: 45°44′33″N 3°46′48″E

The Col de la Loge is a mountain pass in the Forez mountains of the Massif Central at an altitude of 1,253 m (4,111 ft), in the Loire department and the Auvergne-Rhône-Alpes region of France. It is home to a cross-country skiing site with 45 km (28 mi) of routes in the Domaine nordique du haut Forez.

== Geography ==
The Col de la Loge is at an altitude of 1,253 m (4,111 ft) located on the ridge line of the Forez mountains, on the edge of the communal territories of La Chamba, La Chambonie and Jeansagnière, in the Loire department, in the Auvergne-Rhône-Alpes region, 17 km (11 mi) from the Chalmazel alpine ski area and 42 km (26 mi) from Montbrison.

The col is a clearing surrounded by fir trees which do not allow distant views, unlike the routes of the cross-country skiing area, which are partly on the Natura 2000 classified high plateaus of the Forez mountains. The skiing routes allow panoramas of the Auvergne-Rhône-Alpes region, where Mont Blanc stands out in the distance and with a view of the Monts Dore and the Puy de Dôme.

== Sport ==
=== Skiing ===
The ski resort was created in the 1970s. Starting from the Col de la Loge, the ski area offers a 1.5 km (0.93 mi) green circuit, a 5 km (3.1 mi) blue circuit, a 9 km (5.6 mi) red circuit and three black circuits of 12, 15 and 17 km (7.5, 9.3 and 10.6 mi), respectively. The Col de la Loge also has four snowshoe walking routes from 4 to 11 km (2.5 to 6.8 mi) and two toboggan runs.

=== Cycling ===
The ascent of the Col de la Loge was used for the finish of Stage 2 of the 2024 Critérium du Dauphiné. This climb did not count in the mountains classification because it was preceded by the Col de la Croix de Ladret. Bruno Armirail, in the breakaway, was caught close to the finish line. Magnus Cort Nielsen won in a sprint from the leading peloton.
