= 1992 Critérium du Dauphiné Libéré =

Race details
- Dates: 1–8 June 1992
- Stages: 8
- Distance: 1,297.3 km (806.1 mi)
- Winning time: 36h 30' 19"

Results
Jersey awarded to the overall winner	Winner	Charly Mottet (FRA)	(RMO–Onet)
	Second	Luc Leblanc (FRA)	(Castorama)
	Third	Gianni Bugno (ITA)	(Gatorade–Chateau d'Ax)
Jersey awarded to the points classification winner	Points	Luc Leblanc (FRA)	(Castorama)
Jersey awarded to the mountains classification winner	Mountains	Thierry Claveyrolat (FRA)	(Z)

The 1992 Critérium du Dauphiné Libéré was the 44th edition of the cycle race and was held from 1 June to 8 June 1992. The race started in Charbonnières-les-Bains and finished in Villard-de-Lans. The race was won by Charly Mottet of the RMO team.

== Teams ==
Fourteen teams, containing a total of 111 riders, participated in the race:

- Postobón–Manzana–Ryalcao
- Kelme–Don Cafe
- Z
- Amaya Seguros
- Panasonic–Sportlife
- Castorama
- RMO–Onet
- Lotto–Mavic–MBK
- Buckler–Colnago–Decca
- Helvetia–Fichtel & Sachs
- PDM–Ultima–Concorde
- Chazal–Vanille et Mûre
- Gatorade–Chateau d'Ax
- Russ–Baikal

== Route ==
Stage characteristics and winners
Stage	Date	Course	Distance	Type	Winner
1	1 June	Charbonnières-les-Bains to Vaulx-en-Velin	147.8 km (91.8 mi)		Wilfried Nelissen (BEL)
2	2 June	Villeurbanne to Privas	206 km (128 mi)		Luc Leblanc (FRA)
3	3 June	Privas to Valence	176 km (109 mi)		Wilfried Nelissen (BEL)
4	4 June	Tain-l'Hermitage to Aix-les-Bains	164 km (102 mi)		Jean-Claude Leclercq (FRA)
5	5 June	Annecy to Cluses	190 km (120 mi)		Laudelino Cubino (ESP)
6	6 June	Cluses to Le Collet d'Allevard	204 km (127 mi)		Martín Farfán (COL)
7	7 June	Allevard-les-Bains to Villard-de-Lans	177 km (110 mi)		William Palacio (COL)
8	8 June	Villard-de-Lans to Villard-de-Lans	32.5 km (20.2 mi)	Individual time trial	Charly Mottet (FRA)

== General classification ==
Final general classification

Rank	Rider	Team	Time
1	Charly Mottet (FRA)	RMO–Onet	36h 30' 19"
2	Luc Leblanc (FRA)	Castorama	+ 43"
3	Gianni Bugno (ITA)	Gatorade–Chateau d'Ax	+ 2' 11"
4	Beat Zberg (SUI)	Helvetia–Commodore	+ 2' 40"
5	Alberto Camargo (COL)	Postobón–Manzana–Ryalcao	+ 3' 01"
6	Laurent Dufaux (SUI)	Helvetia–Commodore	+ 3' 02"
7	Ronan Pensec (FRA)	RMO–Onet	+ 3' 03"
8	José Martín Farfán (COL)	Kelme–Don Cafe	+ 3' 22"
9	Alvaro Mejia (COL)	Postobón–Manzana–Ryalcao	+ 4' 21"
10	Hernán Buenahora (COL)	Kelme–Don Cafe	+ 4' 31"
