= Jean Dotto =

French cyclist

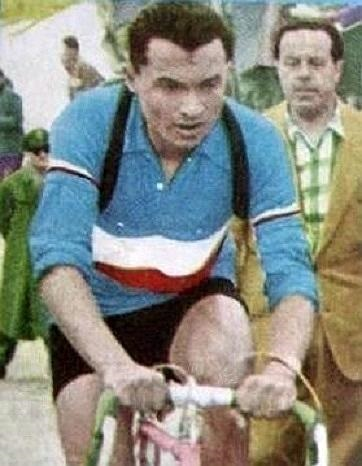

Personal information
- Full name: Jean-Baptiste Dotto
- Nickname: Le Vigneron de Cabasse
- Born: 27 March 1928 St-Nazaire, France
- Died: 20 February 2000 (aged 71) Ollioules, France

Cycling career
- Sport: Cycling
- Discipline: Road
- Role: Rider
- Rider type: Climber

Professional teams
- 1948-1950: Independent (semi-professional)
- 1950: Urago
- 1951-1953: France Sport Dunlop
- 1953: Magnat-Debon-Wolber
- 1954: Magnat-Debon
- 1954: Terrot-Hutchinson
- 1955: Vampire d'Alessandro
- 1956: St-Raphaël-Dunlop-Geminiani
- 1957-1959: Liberia Hutchinson
- 1960-1962: Liberia-Grammont
- 1963: Margnat-Paloma

Major wins
- Critérium du Dauphiné Libéré (1952, 1960); 1955 Vuelta a España

Jean-Baptiste Dotto (27 March 1928, in St-Nazaire – 20 February 2000, in Ollioules, France) was the first French racing cyclist to win the Vuelta a España. He rode the Tour de France 13 times, coming fourth in 1954.

Jean Dotto was born with Italian nationality. He became French in 1937. Dotto was a good climber. He became an independent, or semi-professional, in 1948 and won a race up Mont Ventoux that year and won Marseille-Toulon-Marseille and the climb of La Turbie, near Nice in 1950. He turned professional in 1951 for France-Sport-Dunlop and won five races, including three hill climbs, in his first season. He rode until 1963, winning 35 races, including the Dauphiné-Libéré twice. He won stage 19 of the 1954 Tour de France and next year won the Vuelta by beating Julio Jiménez of Spain and Raphaël Géminiani of France.

Of his era, he said: "We took amphetamine but not all the year. That allowed us to win and it wasn't very dangerous."

== Major results ==
1952
1st, Overall, Critérium du Dauphiné Libéré
8th, Overall, Tour de France
1954
4th, Overall, Tour de France

1st, Stage 19, Briançon > Aix-les-Bains (221 km)

1955
1st, Overall, Vuelta a España
1956 – Sud-Est
19th, Overall, Tour de France
1957
10th, Overall, Tour de France
1958 – Centre-Midi
DNF Stage 23, Tour de France

3rd, Climbers Classification

1959
15th, Overall, Tour de France
1960
1st, Overall, Critérium du Dauphiné Libéré
35th, Overall, Tour de France
1961
8th, Overall, Tour de France
1962
58th, Overall, Tour de France
1963
28th, Overall, Tour de France
