= Helyett (cycling team) =

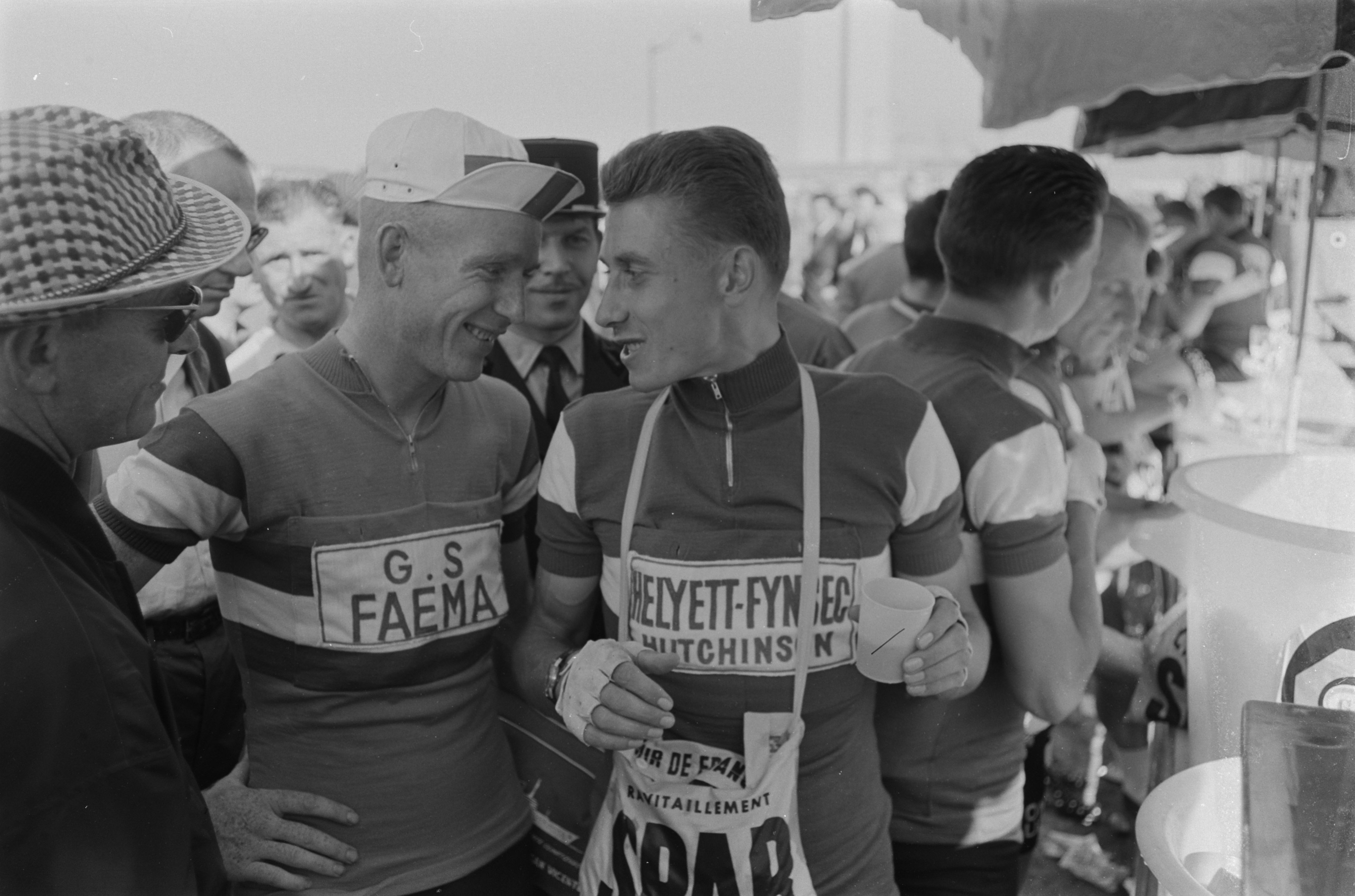
- Helyett–Fynsec–Hutchinson rider Jacques Anquetil (right) at the 1961 Tour de France

Team information
- Registered: France
- Founded: 1932
- Disbanded: 1961
- Discipline: Road

Team name history
- 1932–1936 1937 1938–1944 1945 1946–1947 1948 1949–1951 1952 1953–1955 1956 1957 1958 1959 1959–1960 1960 Giro d'Italia 1961: Helyett–Hutchinson; Helyett–Splendor–Hutchinson; Helyett–Hutchinson; Helyett; Helyett–Hutchinson; Helyett; Helyett–Hutchinson; Helyett; Helyett–Hutchinson; Helyett–Potin–Hutchinson; Helyett–Potin; Helyett–Leroux–Hutchinson; Helyett–Leroux–Fynsec–Hutchinson; Helyett–Leroux–Fynsec–Hutchinson; Fynsec–Helyett; Helyett–Fynsec–Hutchinson
Helyett jersey
Jersey

Helyett was a French professional cycling team that existed from 1932 to 1961.

== History ==
In 1919, the Picard brothers founded the a company making cycle parts in Sully-sur-Loire, with a second factory in Orleans. They called this company "Helyett", after the operette "Miss Helyett. Soon, they also made bicycles. In 1932, they started to sponsor a cycling team.

Helyett sponsored Jacques Anquetil for most of his career, including three of his five victories in the Tour de France.

In 1962, cycling sponsors joint forces with extrasportive sponsors to save costs; Helyett joined ACBB and Saint-Raphael to form a new team. Jacques Anquetil won the 1962 Tour de France for this team. This would be the final year that Helyett sponsored a cycling team. Later in 1962, the factory in Orleans was sold, and in 1966 Helyett merged with Gitane.
