= Nello Lauredi =

French cyclist

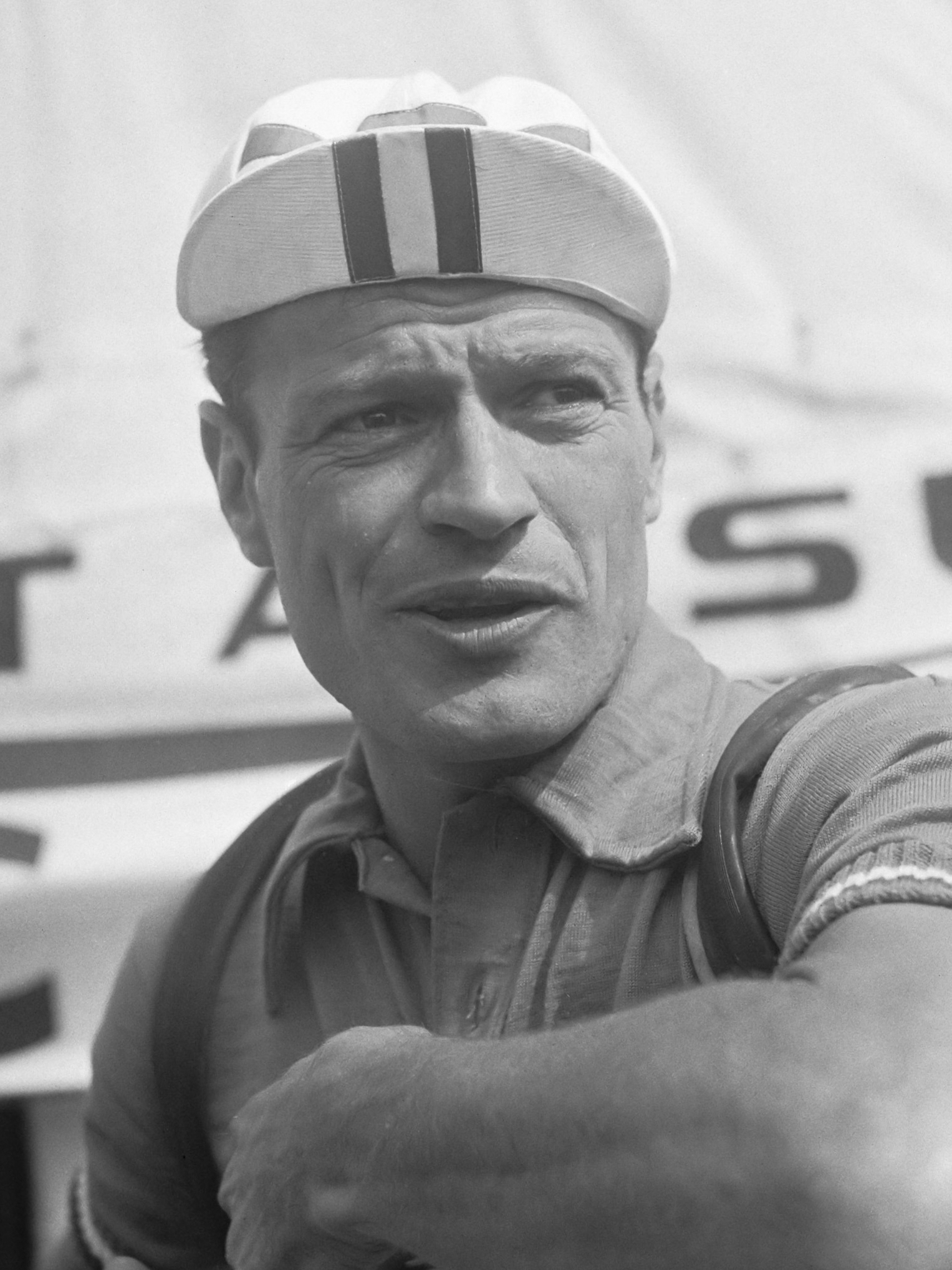

Personal information
- Full name: Nello Lauredi
- Born: 5 October 1924 Mulazzo, Italy
- Died: 8 April 2001 (aged 76) Saint-Laurent-du-Var, France

Cycling career
- Sport: Cycling
- Discipline: Road
- Role: Rider

Major wins
- Dauphiné Libéré (3x)

Nello Lauredi (5 October 1924 in Mulazzo, Italy – 8 April 2001 in Saint-Laurent-du-Var, France) was a professional French road bicycle racer. He was of Italian origin but in 1948 he changed nationality to France. He was a professional cyclist from 1949 until 1959 and had 17 wins. His most important win being three overall wins in the Dauphiné Libéré. Other wins included a stage in the 1950 Tour de France and in the 1952 Tour de France where he also wore the yellow jersey for 4 days.

== Major results ==
1950
Critérium du Dauphiné Libéré
Tour de France:

Winner stage 7

1951
Critérium du Dauphiné Libéré
1952
Paris-Limoges
Tour de France:

Winner stage 3
Wearing yellow jersey for four days

1953
Tour de France:

Winner stage 13
8th place overall classification

1954
Critérium du Dauphiné Libéré
1956
Tour de France:

7th place overall classification

1958
Moulins-Englibert
