= List of teams and cyclists in the 1960 Vuelta a España =

For the 1960 Vuelta a España, the field consisted of 80 riders; 24 finished the race. The numbers 21 to 30 were reserved for a national team from Portugal, which did not start.

== By rider ==
Legend
No.	Starting number worn by the rider during the Vuelta
Pos.	Position in the general classification
DNF	Denotes a rider who did not finish

No.	Name	Nationality	Team	Pos.	Ref
1	Antonio Suárez	Spain	Faema	11	
2	Federico Bahamontes	Spain	Faema	DNF	
3	Jesús Galdeano	Spain	Faema	21	
4	Julio San Emeterio	Spain	Faema	DNF	
5	José Herrero Berrendero	Spain	Faema	DNF	
6	Salvador Botella	Spain	Faema	7	
7	Fernando Manzaneque	Spain	Faema	6	
8	Gabriel Mas	Spain	Faema	DNF	
9	Francisco Moreno	Spain	Faema	DNF	
10	Antonio Bertrán	Spain	Faema	23	
11	Francis Anastasi	France	Margnat-Rochet	DNF	
12	Jean Anastasi	France	Margnat-Rochet	DNF	
13	Antonin Rolland	France	Margnat-Rochet	14	
14	Claude Mattio	France	Margnat-Rochet	DNF	
15	Maurice Moucheraud	France	Margnat-Rochet	DNF	
16	Antoine Abate	France	Margnat-Rochet	DNF	
17	Lucien Fliffel	France	Margnat-Rochet	DNF	
18	Joseph Aure	France	Margnat-Rochet	19	
19	Siro Bianchi	France	Margnat-Rochet	DNF	
20	Organ Iacoponi	France	Margnat-Rochet	DNF	
31	Noël Foré	Belgium	Groene Leeuw	DNF	
32	Arthur Decabooter	Belgium	Groene Leeuw	10	
33	Frans De Mulder	Belgium	Groene Leeuw	1	
34	Armand Desmet	Belgium	Groene Leeuw	2	
35	Lucien Mathys	Belgium	Groene Leeuw	DNF	
36	Marcel Seynaeve	Belgium	Groene Leeuw	DNF	
37	Alfons Sweeck	Belgium	Groene Leeuw	16	
38	André Messelis	Belgium	Groene Leeuw	12	
39	Constant De Keyser	Belgium	Groene Leeuw	24	
40	Firmin Bral	Belgium	Groene Leeuw	DNF	
41	Charly Gaul	Luxembourg	EMI	DNF	
42	Marcel Ernzer	Luxembourg	EMI	DNF	
43	Aldo Bolzan	Luxembourg	EMI	DNF	
44	Jean-Pierre Schmitz	Luxembourg	EMI	DNF	
45	Pasquale Fornara	Italy	EMI	DNF	
46	Giuseppe Pintarelli	Italy	EMI	DNF	
47	Giovanni Metra	Italy	EMI	DNF	
48	Marcello Chiti	Italy	EMI	DNF	
49	Carlo Guarguaglini	Italy	EMI	DNF	
50	Aldo Moser	Italy	EMI	DNF	
51	Carmelo Morales	Spain	Kas	15	
52	José Segú	Spain	Kas	20	
53	Antonio Karmany	Spain	Kas	4	
54	Manuel Martín Piñera	Spain	Kas	DNF	
55	Benigno Azpuru	Spain	Kas	8	
56	Aniceto Utset	Spain	Kas	DNF	
57	Juan Campillo	Spain	Kas	5	
58	Antonio Jiménez Quiles	Spain	Kas	DNF	
59	Alfred Esmatges	Spain	Kas	DNF	
60	Rogelio Hernández	Spain	Kas	DNF	
61	Vicente Iturat	Spain	Ferrys	DNF	
62	René Marigil	Spain	Ferrys	13	
63	José Pérez Francés	Spain	Ferrys	DNF	
64	Emilio Cruz	Spain	Ferrys	DNF	
65	Antonio Uliana	Spain	Ferrys	DNF	
66	Silvestro La Cioppa	Spain	Ferrys	DNF	
67	Joan Escolà	Spain	Ferrys	DNF	
68	Gilberto Dall'Agata	Italy	Ferrys	DNF	
69	Adolf Christian	Austria	Ferrys	DNF	
70	Nino Assirelli	Italy	Ferrys	DNF	
71	Antonio Gómez del Moral	Spain	Licor 43	DNF	
72	José Gómez del Moral	Spain	Licor 43	17	
73	Joaquín Barceló	Spain	Licor 43	DNF	
74	Antonio Carreras	Spain	Licor 43	DNF	
75	Santiago Montilla	Spain	Licor 43	22	
76	Miguel Bover	Spain	Licor 43	DNF	
77	Gabriel Company	Spain	Licor 43	DNF	
78	Emilio Hernán	Spain	Licor 43	DNF	
79	Ángel Guardiola Ortiz	Spain	Licor 43	18	
80	Miguel Pacheco	Spain	Licor 43	3	
81	Jesús Loroño	Spain	Majestad	9	
82	Antonio Barrutia	Spain	Majestad	DNF	
83	Antonio Ferraz	Spain	Majestad	DNF	
84	José Luis Talamillo	Spain	Majestad	DNF	
85	Angel Rodriguez	Spain	Majestad	DNF	
86	Fausto Iza	Spain	Majestad	DNF	
87	Carlos Pérez Zabal	Spain	Majestad	DNF	
88	Felipe Alberdi	Spain	Majestad	DNF	
89	José Urrestarazu	Spain	Majestad	DNF	
90	Juan Manuel Menéndez	Spain	Majestad	DNF	
