= 1960 Vuelta a España, Stage 1 to Stage 9 =

Cycling race stages

The 1960 Vuelta a España was the 15th edition of the Vuelta a España, one of cycling's Grand Tours. The Vuelta began in Gijón, with a team time trial on 29 April, and Stage 10 occurred on 8 May with a stage to Barbastro. The race finished in Bilbao on 15 May.

== Stage 1 ==
29 April 1960 - Gijón to Gijón, 8 km (5.0 mi) (TTT)

Stage 1 result and General Classification after Stage 1

	Rider	Team	Time
1	Gabriel Mas (ESP)	Faema	10' 26"
2	Jesús Galdeano (ESP)	Faema	+ 1"
3	Fernando Manzaneque (ESP)	Faema	s.t.
4	Francisco Moreno (ESP)	Faema	+ 3"
5	José Herrero Berrendero (ESP)	Faema	s.t.
6	Frans De Mulder (BEL)	Groene Leeuw–Sinalco–SAS	+ 5"
7	Arthur Decabooter (BEL)	Groene Leeuw–Sinalco–SAS	s.t.
8	Noël Foré (BEL)	Groene Leeuw–Sinalco–SAS	s.t.
9	Alfons Sweeck (BEL)	Groene Leeuw–Sinalco–SAS	s.t.
10	José Segú (ESP)	Kas–Boxing	+ 8"

== Stage 2 ==
30 April 1960 - Gijón to A Coruña, 235 km (146.0 mi)

Route:

Stage 2 result

Rank	Rider	Team	Time
1	Felipe Alberdi (ESP)	Majestad	6h 18' 10"
2	Aldo Moser (ITA)	EMI–Guerra	+ 1' 25"
3	Antonio Gómez del Moral (ESP)	Licor 43	+ 2' 40"
4	Juan Campillo (ESP)	Kas–Boxing	s.t.
5	Armand Desmet (BEL)	Groene Leeuw–Sinalco–SAS	s.t.
6	Jesús Galdeano (ESP)	Faema	+ 2' 42"
7	Antonio Jiménez Quiles (ESP)	Kas–Boxing	+ 2' 44"
8	Vicente Iturat (ESP)	Ferrys	+ 2' 53"
9	José Luis Talamillo (ESP)	Majestad	s.t.
10	Arthur Decabooter (BEL)	Groene Leeuw–Sinalco–SAS	s.t.

General classification after Stage 2

Rank	Rider	Team	Time
1	Felipe Alberdi (ESP)	Majestad	6h 28' 58"
2	Aldo Moser (ITA)	EMI–Guerra	+ 1' 15"
3	Jesús Galdeano (ESP)	Faema	+ 2' 21"
4	Juan Campillo (ESP)	Kas–Boxing	+ 2' 26"
5	Fernando Manzaneque (ESP)	Faema	+ 2' 32"
6	Armand Desmet (BEL)	Groene Leeuw–Sinalco–SAS	+ 2' 35"
7	Frans De Mulder (BEL)	Groene Leeuw–Sinalco–SAS	+ 3' 36"
8	Arthur Decabooter (BEL)	Groene Leeuw–Sinalco–SAS	s.t.
9	Alfons Sweeck (BEL)	Groene Leeuw–Sinalco–SAS	s.t.
10	Antonio Gómez del Moral (ESP)	Licor 43	+ 2' 38"

== Stage 3 ==
1 May 1960 - A Coruña to Vigo, 187 km (116 mi)

Route:

Stage 3 result

Rank	Rider	Team	Time
1	Antonio Barrutia (ESP)	Majestad	5h 14' 02"
2	Fernando Manzaneque (ESP)	Faema	+ 32"
3	Jesús Galdeano (ESP)	Faema	+ 1' 04"
4	Gabriel Mas (ESP)	Faema	+ 1' 58"
5	Carlo Guarguaglini (ITA)	EMI–Guerra	s.t.
6	Emilio Cruz (ESP)	Ferrys	s.t.
7	Antonio Karmany (ESP)	Kas–Boxing	s.t.
8	Joan Escolà (ESP)	Ferrys	s.t.
9	Adolf Christian (AUT)	Ferrys	s.t.
10	Ángel Guardiola Ortiz (ESP)	Licor 43	s.t.

General classification after Stage 3

Rank	Rider	Team	Time
1	Antonio Barrutia (ESP)	Majestad	11h 45' 55"
2	Fernando Manzaneque (ESP)	Faema	+ 9"
3	Jesús Galdeano (ESP)	Faema	+ 31"
4	Adolf Christian (AUT)	Ferrys	+ 1' 55"
5	Antonio Karmany (ESP)	Kas–Boxing	+ 2' 24"
6	Gabriel Mas (ESP)	Faema	+ 2' 58"
7	Joseph Aure (FRA)	Coupry–Margnat	+ 3' 24"
8	Carlo Guarguaglini (ITA)	EMI–Guerra	+ 4' 15"
9	Joan Escolà (ESP)	Ferrys	+ 7' 45"
10	Emilio Cruz (ESP)	Ferrys	+ 7' 47"

== Stage 4 ==
2 May 1960 - Vigo to Ourense, 105 km (65 mi)

Route:

Stage 4 result

Rank	Rider	Team	Time
1	Frans De Mulder (BEL)	Groene Leeuw–Sinalco–SAS	2h 44' 35"
2	Benigno Azpuru (ESP)	Kas–Boxing	+ 34"
3	Arthur Decabooter (BEL)	Groene Leeuw–Sinalco–SAS	+ 2' 00"
4	Carmelo Morales (ESP)	Kas–Boxing	s.t.
5	Antonio Karmany (ESP)	Kas–Boxing	s.t.
6	Gabriel Mas (ESP)	Faema	s.t.
7	Aldo Moser (ITA)	EMI–Guerra	s.t.
8	Adolf Christian (AUT)	Ferrys	s.t.
9	Jesús Galdeano (ESP)	Faema	s.t.
10	José Pérez Francés (ESP)	Ferrys	s.t.

== Stage 5 ==
3 May 1960 - Ourense to Zamora, 287 km (178 mi)

Route:

Stage 5 result

Rank	Rider	Team	Time
1	Antonio Gómez del Moral (ESP)	Licor 43	8h 36' 02"
2	Arthur Decabooter (BEL)	Groene Leeuw–Sinalco–SAS	+ 30"
3	Gabriel Mas (ESP)	Faema	+ 1' 01"
4	Juan Campillo (ESP)	Kas–Boxing	+ 1' 02"
5	José Segú (ESP)	Kas–Boxing	+ 1' 04"
6	Jesús Galdeano (ESP)	Faema	+ 1' 05"
7	Francisco Moreno (ESP)	Faema	+ 1' 07"
8	José Herrero Berrendero (ESP)	Faema	+ 1' 16"
9	André Messelis (BEL)	Groene Leeuw–Sinalco–SAS	+ 1' 20"
10	Carlo Guarguaglini (ITA)	EMI–Guerra	+ 1' 30"

General classification after Stage 5

Rank	Rider	Team	Time
1	Jesús Galdeano (ESP)	Faema	23h 01' 08"
2	Antonio Barrutia (ESP)	Majestad	+ 9' 03"
3	Fernando Manzaneque (ESP)	Faema	+ 9' 12"
4	Adolf Christian (AUT)	Ferrys	+ 10' 58"
5	Gabriel Mas (ESP)	Faema	+ 11' 23"
6	Joseph Aure (FRA)	Coupry–Margnat	+ 12' 27"
7	Joan Escolà (ESP)	Ferrys	+ 16' 48"
8	Carlo Guarguaglini (ITA)	EMI–Guerra	+ 17' 06"
9	Antonio Karmany (ESP)	Kas–Boxing	+ 17' 17"
10	Juan Campillo (ESP)	Kas–Boxing	+ 17' 18"

== Stage 6 ==
4 May 1960 - Zamora to Madrid, 250 km (160 mi)

Route:

Stage 6 result

Rank	Rider	Team	Time
1	Nino Assirelli (ITA)	Ferrys	6h 29' 50"
2	Gilberto Dall'Agata (ITA)	Ferrys	+ 30"
3	Santiago Montilla (ESP)	Licor 43	+ 1' 00"
4	José Segú (ESP)	Kas–Boxing	+ 8' 48"
5	Fernando Manzaneque (ESP)	Faema	s.t.
6	Federico Bahamontes (ESP)	Faema	s.t.
7	Juan Campillo (ESP)	Kas–Boxing	s.t.
8	Arthur Decabooter (BEL)	Groene Leeuw–Sinalco–SAS	+ 11' 20"
9	René Marigil (ESP)	Ferrys	s.t.
10	Julio San Emeterio (ESP)	Faema	s.t.

General classification after Stage 6

Rank	Rider	Team	Time
1	Fernando Manzaneque (ESP)	Faema	29h 48' 58"
2	Jesús Galdeano (ESP)	Faema	+ 4' 00"
3	Antonio Barrutia (ESP)	Majestad	+ 4' 03"
4	Adolf Christian (AUT)	Ferrys	+ 4' 18"
5	Gabriel Mas (ESP)	Faema	+ 7' 06"
6	Joseph Aure (FRA)	Coupry–Margnat	+ 7' 27"
7	Juan Campillo (ESP)	Kas–Boxing	+ 8' 06"
8	Gilberto Dall'Agata (ITA)	Ferrys	+ 8' 48"
9	José Segú (ESP)	Kas–Boxing	+ 11' 34"
10	Joan Escolà (ESP)	Ferrys	+ 11' 48"

== Stage 7 ==
5 May 1960 - Madrid to Madrid, 209 km (130 mi)

Route:

Stage 7 result

Rank	Rider	Team	Time
1	Frans De Mulder (BEL)	Groene Leeuw–Sinalco–SAS	5h 41' 53"
2	Charly Gaul (LUX)	EMI–Guerra	+ 30"
3	Arthur Decabooter (BEL)	Groene Leeuw–Sinalco–SAS	+ 4' 36"
4	Fernando Manzaneque (ESP)	Faema	+ 4' 48"
5	Antonio Karmany (ESP)	Kas–Boxing	+ 4' 56"
6	Juan Campillo (ESP)	Kas–Boxing	+ 4' 58"
7	Miguel Pacheco (ESP)	Licor 43	+ 5' 06"
8	Antonio Suárez (ESP)	Faema	+ 5' 14"
9	Vicente Iturat (ESP)	Ferrys	+ 5' 40"
10	José Segú (ESP)	Kas–Boxing	s.t.

General classification after Stage 7

Rank	Rider	Team	Time
1	Fernando Manzaneque (ESP)	Faema	35h 35' 39"
2	Juan Campillo (ESP)	Kas–Boxing	+ 8' 16"
3	Frans De Mulder (BEL)	Groene Leeuw–Sinalco–SAS	+ 9' 16"
4	Charly Gaul (LUX)	EMI–Guerra	+ 12' 08"
5	Antonio Karmany (ESP)	Kas–Boxing	+ 12' 25"
6	José Segú (ESP)	Kas–Boxing	+ 12' 26"
7	Joan Escolà (ESP)	Ferrys	+ 12' 40"
8	Adolf Christian (AUT)	Ferrys	+ 13' 16"
9	Arthur Decabooter (BEL)	Groene Leeuw–Sinalco–SAS	+ 13' 17"
10	Federico Bahamontes (ESP)	Faema	+ 13' 22"

== Stage 8 ==
6 May 1960 - Guadalajara to Zaragoza, 264 km (164 mi)

Route:

Stage 8 result

Rank	Rider	Team	Time
1	Arthur Decabooter (BEL)	Groene Leeuw–Sinalco–SAS	9h 20' 10"
2	Marcello Chiti (ITA)	EMI–Guerra	+ 34"
3	Julio San Emeterio (ESP)	Faema	+ 1' 06"
4	Pasquale Fornara (ITA)	EMI–Guerra	+ 1' 13"
5	Marcel Seynaeve (BEL)	Groene Leeuw–Sinalco–SAS	s.t.
6	Giuseppe Pintarelli (ITA)	EMI–Guerra	s.t.
7	Vicente Iturat (ESP)	Ferrys	+ 1' 19"
8	Aldo Bolzan (LUX)	EMI–Guerra	s.t.
9	Silvestro La Cioppa (ESP)	Ferrys	s.t.
10	Fausto Iza (ESP)	Majestad	+ 1' 24"

General classification after Stage 8

Rank	Rider	Team	Time
1	Fernando Manzaneque (ESP)	Faema	44h 57' 13"
2	Juan Campillo (ESP)	Kas–Boxing	+ 8' 16"
3	Frans De Mulder (BEL)	Groene Leeuw–Sinalco–SAS	+ 9' 16"
4	Arthur Decabooter (BEL)	Groene Leeuw–Sinalco–SAS	+ 11' 53"
5	Charly Gaul (LUX)	EMI–Guerra	+ 12' 08"
6	Antonio Karmany (ESP)	Kas–Boxing	+ 12' 25"
7	José Segú (ESP)	Kas–Boxing	+ 12' 26"
8	Joan Escolà (ESP)	Ferrys	+ 12' 40"
9	Adolf Christian (AUT)	Ferrys	+ 13' 16"
10	Federico Bahamontes (ESP)	Faema	+ 13' 22"

== Stage 9 ==
7 May 1960 - Zaragoza to Barcelona, 269 km (167 mi)

Route:

Stage 9 result

Rank	Rider	Team	Time
1	Salvador Botella (ESP)	Faema	5h 59' 00"
2	Frans De Mulder (BEL)	Groene Leeuw–Sinalco–SAS	+ 1' 04"
3	André Messelis (BEL)	Groene Leeuw–Sinalco–SAS	+ 1' 34"
4	Antonio Karmany (ESP)	Kas–Boxing	s.t.
5	Aldo Moser (ITA)	EMI–Guerra	s.t.
6	Antonio Jiménez Quiles (ESP)	Kas–Boxing	s.t.
7	Armand Desmet (BEL)	Groene Leeuw–Sinalco–SAS	s.t.
8	Miguel Pacheco (ESP)	Licor 43	s.t.
9	Joan Escolà (ESP)	Ferrys	+ 14' 54"
10	Benigno Azpuru (ESP)	Kas–Boxing	s.t.

General classification after Stage 9

Rank	Rider	Team	Time
1	Frans De Mulder (BEL)	Groene Leeuw–Sinalco–SAS	51h 06' 33"
2	Antonio Karmany (ESP)	Kas–Boxing	+ 3' 39"
3	Salvador Botella (ESP)	Faema	+ 8' 04"
4	Armand Desmet (BEL)	Groene Leeuw–Sinalco–SAS	+ 8' 27"
5	Antonio Jiménez Quiles (ESP)	Kas–Boxing	+ 8' 31"
6	Miguel Pacheco (ESP)	Licor 43	+ 11' 33"
7	Joan Escolà (ESP)	Ferrys	+ 17' 14"
8	André Messelis (BEL)	Groene Leeuw–Sinalco–SAS	+ 23' 29"
9	Aldo Moser (ITA)	EMI–Guerra	+ 26' 08"
10	Fernando Manzaneque (ESP)	Faema	+ 28' 17"
