= List of teams and cyclists in the 1960 Tour de France =

List of cyclists

The 1960 Tour de France was run in the national team format. The four most important cycling nations of the time, Spain, Belgium, France and Italy, each sent a national team with fourteen cyclists. There were also five smaller national teams: a combined Luxembourg/Swiss team, a Dutch team, a German team, a British team, and a team of international cyclists, all with eight cyclists. Finally, there were five regional teams, also of eight cyclists each. Altogether, 128 cyclists started the race.

Jacques Anquetil, the winner of the 1957 Tour de France, had won the 1960 Giro d'Italia earlier that year. Anquetil was tired, and skipped the Tour. This made Roger Rivière the French team leader, and the big favourite for the Tour victory.

== Start list ==
=== By team ===
Spain
No.	Rider	Pos.
1	Federico Bahamontes (ESP)	DNF
2	José Herrero Berrendero (ESP)	81
3	Jesús Galdeano (ESP)	DNF
4	José Gómez del Moral (ESP)	DNF
5	Antonio Karmany (ESP)	DNF
6	Jesús Loroño (ESP)	21
7	Fernando Manzaneque (ESP)	11
8	René Marigil (ESP)	62
9	Gabriel Mas (ESP)	DNF
10	Carmelo Morales Erostarbe (ESP)	20
11	Luis Otaño (ESP)	42
12	Miguel Pacheco (ESP)	69
13	Julio San Emeterio (ESP)	DNF
14	Antonio Suárez (ESP)	17

Belgium
No.	Rider	Pos.
21	Jan Adriaensens (BEL)	3
22	Jean Brankart (BEL)	DNF
23	Armand Desmet (BEL)	53
24	Jos Hoevenaers (BEL)	DNF
25	Marcel Janssens (BEL)	DNF
26	André Messelis (BEL)	43
27	Yvo Molenaers (BEL)	64
28	Eddy Pauwels (BEL)	25
29	Jef Planckaert (BEL)	5
30	Louis Proost (BEL)	DNF
31	Julien Schepens (BEL)	DNF
32	Frans Schoubben (BEL)	DNF
33	Michel Van Aerde (BEL)	24
34	Martin Van Geneugden (BEL)	DNF

France
No.	Rider	Pos.
41	Henry Anglade (FRA)	8
42	Robert Cazala (FRA)	DNF
43	Claude Colette (FRA)	DNF
44	André Darrigade (FRA)	16
45	Édouard Delberghe (FRA)	18
46	Jean Dotto (FRA)	35
47	Pierre Everaert (FRA)	32
48	Jean Graczyk (FRA)	13
49	Raymond Mastrotto (FRA)	6
50	François Mahé (FRA)	14
51	René Pavard (FRA)	19
52	René Privat (FRA)	DNF
53	Roger Rivière (FRA)	DNF
54	Louis Rostollan (FRA)	15

Italy
No.	Rider	Pos.
61	Pierino Baffi (ITA)	68
62	Ercole Baldini (ITA)	33
63	Graziano Battistini (ITA)	2
64	Fernando Brandolini (ITA)	78
65	Dino Bruni (ITA)	72
66	Vittorio Casatti (ITA)	57
67	Nino Defilippis (ITA)	67
68	Nello Fabbri (ITA)	76
69	Roberto Falaschi (ITA)	49
70	Gianni Ferlenghi (ITA)	71
71	Imerio Massignan (ITA)	10
72	Gastone Nencini (ITA)	1
73	Arnaldo Pambianco (ITA)	7
74	Alfredo Sabbadin (ITA)	41

Switzerland-Luxembourg
No.	Rider	Pos.
81	Kurt Gimmi (SUI)	22
82	Rolf Graf (SUI)	70
83	Hans Schleuniger (SUI)	80
84	Attilio Moresi (SUI)	DNF
85	René Strehler (SUI)	37
86	Willy Trepp (SUI)	DNF
87	Aldo Bolzan (LUX)	54
88	Jean-Pierre Schmitz (LUX)	DNF

Netherlands
No.	Rider	Pos.
91	Piet Damen (NED)	27
92	Jo de Roo (NED)	DNF
93	Albertus Geldermans (NED)	12
94	Jaap Kersten (NED)	45
95	Coen Niesten (NED)	DNF
96	Martin van der Borgh (NED)	34
97	Piet van Est (NED)	28
98	Wim van Est (NED)	39

Germany
No.	Rider	Pos.
101	Willi Altig (FRG)	DNF
102	Manfred Donike (FRG)	DNF
103	Lothar Friedrich (FRG)	51
104	Hans Jaroszewicz (FRG)	DNF
105	Hans Junkermann (FRG)	4
106	Emil Reinecke (FRG)	56
107	Franz Reitz (FRG)	DNF
108	Horst Tüller (FRG)	DNF

Internationals
No.	Rider	Pos.
111	Adolf Christian (AUT)	DNF
112	Wilfried Thaler (AUT)	DNF
113	Leif Hammel (DEN)	DNF
114	Thadeus Wierucki (POL)	DNF
115	Bent Ole Retvig (DEN)	DNF
116	Antonino Dos Santos Baptista (POR)	DNF
117	António Alves Barbosa (POR)	65
118	Göran Karlsson (SWE)	DNF

Great Britain
No.	Rider	Pos.
121	John Andrews (GBR)	DNF
122	Stan Brittain (GBR)	DNF
123	John Kennedy (GBR)	DNF
124	Harry Reynolds (GBR)	DNF
125	Brian Robinson (GBR)	26
126	Norman Sheil (GBR)	DNF
127	Tom Simpson (GBR)	29
128	Victor Sutton (GBR)	DNF

France – West
No.	Rider	Pos.
131	Édouard Bihouée (FRA)	61
132	Max Bléneau (FRA)	58
133	André Foucher (FRA)	DNF
134	Jean Gainche (FRA)	36
135	Joseph Groussard (FRA)	52
136	Félix Lebuhotel (FRA)	40
137	Fernand Picot (FRA)	46
138	Francis Pipelin (FRA)	73

France – East/South-East
No.	Rider	Pos.
141	Jean Anastasi (FRA)	DNF
142	Louis Bisilliat (FRA)	74
143	Jean Forestier (FRA)	DNF
144	Hubert Ferrer (FRA)	DNF
145	Bernard Gauthier (FRA)	79
146	Jean Milesi (FRA)	55
147	Pierre Morel (FRA)	77
148	Antonin Rolland (FRA)	59

France – Paris-North
No.	Rider	Pos.
151	Joseph Wasko (FRA)	38
152	André Geneste (FRA)	DNF
153	Pierre Gouget (FRA)	DNF
154	Raymond Hoorelbeke (FRA)	48
155	Stéphane Lach (FRA)	23
156	André Le Dissez (FRA)	47
157	Michel Vermeulin (FRA)	30
158	Bernard Viot (FRA)	44

France – Centre-Midi
No.	Rider	Pos.
161	Pierre Beuffeuil (FRA)	31
162	Manuel Busto (FRA)	75
163	Camille Le Menn (FRA)	66
164	Marcel Queheille (FRA)	50
165	Marcel Rohrbach (FRA)	9
166	Pierre Ruby (FRA)	63
167	Tino Sabbadini (FRA)	60
168	Gérard Thiélin (FRA)	DNF

=== By rider ===
Legend
No.	Starting number worn by the rider during the Tour
Pos.	Position in the general classification
DNF	Denotes a rider who did not finish

No.	Name	Nationality	Team	Pos.	Ref
1	Federico Bahamontes	Spain	Spain	DNF	
2	José Herrero Berrendero	Spain	Spain	81	
3	Jesús Galdeano	Spain	Spain	DNF	
4	José Gómez del Moral	Spain	Spain	DNF	
5	Antonio Karmany	Spain	Spain	DNF	
6	Jesús Loroño	Spain	Spain	21	
7	Fernando Manzaneque	Spain	Spain	11	
8	René Marigil	Spain	Spain	62	
9	Gabriel Mas	Spain	Spain	DNF	
10	Carmelo Morales Erostarbe	Spain	Spain	20	
11	Luis Otaño	Spain	Spain	42	
12	Miguel Pacheco	Spain	Spain	69	
13	Julio San Emeterio	Spain	Spain	DNF	
14	Antonio Suárez	Spain	Spain	17	
21	Jan Adriaensens	Belgium	Belgium	3	
22	Jean Brankart	Belgium	Belgium	DNF	
23	Armand Desmet	Belgium	Belgium	53	
24	Jos Hoevenaers	Belgium	Belgium	DNF	
25	Marcel Janssens	Belgium	Belgium	DNF	
26	André Messelis	Belgium	Belgium	43	
27	Yvo Molenaers	Belgium	Belgium	64	
28	Eddy Pauwels	Belgium	Belgium	25	
29	Jef Planckaert	Belgium	Belgium	5	
30	Louis Proost	Belgium	Belgium	DNF	
31	Julien Schepens	Belgium	Belgium	DNF	
32	Frans Schoubben	Belgium	Belgium	DNF	
33	Michel Van Aerde	Belgium	Belgium	24	
34	Martin Van Geneugden	Belgium	Belgium	DNF	
41	Henry Anglade	France	France	8	
42	Robert Cazala	France	France	DNF	
43	Claude Colette	France	France	DNF	
44	André Darrigade	France	France	16	
45	Édouard Delberghe	France	France	18	
46	Jean Dotto	France	France	35	
47	Pierre Everaert	France	France	32	
48	Jean Graczyk	France	France	13	
49	Raymond Mastrotto	France	France	6	
50	François Mahé	France	France	14	
51	René Pavard	France	France	19	
52	René Privat	France	France	DNF	
53	Roger Rivière	France	France	DNF	
54	Louis Rostollan	France	France	15	
61	Pierino Baffi	Italy	Italy	68	
62	Ercole Baldini	Italy	Italy	33	
63	Graziano Battistini	Italy	Italy	2	
64	Fernando Brandolini	Italy	Italy	78	
65	Dino Bruni	Italy	Italy	72	
66	Vittorio Casatti	Italy	Italy	57	
67	Nino Defilippis	Italy	Italy	67	
68	Nello Fabbri	Italy	Italy	76	
69	Roberto Falaschi	Italy	Italy	49	
70	Gianni Ferlenghi	Italy	Italy	71	
71	Imerio Massignan	Italy	Italy	10	
72	Gastone Nencini	Italy	Italy	1	
73	Arnaldo Pambianco	Italy	Italy	7	
74	Alfredo Sabbadin	Italy	Italy	41	
81	Kurt Gimmi	Switzerland	Switzerland-Luxembourg	22	
82	Rolf Graf	Switzerland	Switzerland-Luxembourg	70	
83	Hans Schleuniger	Switzerland	Switzerland-Luxembourg	80	
84	Attilio Moresi	Switzerland	Switzerland-Luxembourg	DNF	
85	René Strehler	Switzerland	Switzerland-Luxembourg	37	
86	Willy Trepp	Switzerland	Switzerland-Luxembourg	DNF	
87	Aldo Bolzan	Luxembourg	Switzerland-Luxembourg	54	
88	Jean-Pierre Schmitz	Luxembourg	Switzerland-Luxembourg	DNF	
91	Piet Damen	Netherlands	Netherlands	27	
92	Jo de Roo	Netherlands	Netherlands	DNF	
93	Albertus Geldermans	Netherlands	Netherlands	12	
94	Jaap Kersten	Netherlands	Netherlands	45	
95	Coen Niesten	Netherlands	Netherlands	DNF	
96	Martin van der Borgh	Netherlands	Netherlands	34	
97	Piet van Est	Netherlands	Netherlands	28	
98	Wim van Est	Netherlands	Netherlands	39	
101	Willi Altig	West Germany	Germany	DNF	
102	Manfred Donike	West Germany	Germany	DNF	
103	Lothar Friedrich	West Germany	Germany	51	
104	Hans Jaroszewicz	West Germany	Germany	DNF	
105	Hans Junkermann	West Germany	Germany	4	
106	Emil Reinecke	West Germany	Germany	56	
107	Franz Reitz	West Germany	Germany	DNF	
108	Horst Tüller	West Germany	Germany	DNF	
111	Adolf Christian	Austria	Internationals	DNF	
112	Wilfried Thaler	Austria	Internationals	DNF	
113	Leif Hammel	Denmark	Internationals	DNF	
114	Thadeus Wierucki	Poland	Internationals	DNF	
115	Bent Ole Retvig	Denmark	Internationals	DNF	
116	Antonino Dos Santos Baptista	Portugal	Internationals	DNF	
117	António Alves Barbosa	Portugal	Internationals	65	
118	Göran Karlsson	Sweden	Internationals	DNF	
121	John Andrews	Great Britain	Great Britain	DNF	
122	Stan Brittain	Great Britain	Great Britain	DNF	
123	John Kennedy	Great Britain	Great Britain	DNF	
124	Harry Reynolds	Great Britain	Great Britain	DNF	
125	Brian Robinson	Great Britain	Great Britain	26	
126	Norman Sheil	Great Britain	Great Britain	DNF	
127	Tom Simpson	Great Britain	Great Britain	29	
128	Victor Sutton	Great Britain	Great Britain	DNF	
131	Édouard Bihouée	France	France – West	61	
132	Max Bléneau	France	France – West	58	
133	André Foucher	France	France – West	DNF	
134	Jean Gainche	France	France – West	36	
135	Joseph Groussard	France	France – West	52	
136	Félix Lebuhotel	France	France – West	40	
137	Fernand Picot	France	France – West	46	
138	Francis Pipelin	France	France – West	73	
141	Jean Anastasi	France	France – East/South-East	DNF	
142	Louis Bisilliat	France	France – East/South-East	74	
143	Jean Forestier	France	France – East/South-East	DNF	
144	Hubert Ferrer	France	France – East/South-East	DNF	
145	Bernard Gauthier	France	France – East/South-East	79	
146	Jean Milesi	France	France – East/South-East	55	
147	Pierre Morel	France	France – East/South-East	77	
148	Antonin Rolland	France	France – East/South-East	59	
151	Joseph Wasko	France	France – Paris-North	38	
152	André Geneste	France	France – Paris-North	DNF	
153	Pierre Gouget	France	France – Paris-North	DNF	
154	Raymond Hoorelbeke	France	France – Paris-North	48	
155	Stéphane Lach	France	France – Paris-North	23	
156	André Le Dissez	France	France – Paris-North	47	
157	Michel Vermeulin	France	France – Paris-North	30	
158	Bernard Viot	France	France – Paris-North	44	
161	Pierre Beuffeuil	France	France – Centre-Midi	31	
162	Manuel Busto	France	France – Centre-Midi	75	
163	Camille Le Menn	France	France – Centre-Midi	66	
164	Marcel Queheille	France	France – Centre-Midi	50	
165	Manuel Rohrbach	France	France – Centre-Midi	9	
166	Pierre Ruby	France	France – Centre-Midi	63	
167	Tino Sabbadini	France	France – Centre-Midi	60	
168	Gérard Thiélin	France	France – Centre-Midi	DNF	
