= 1960 Vuelta a España, Stage 10 to Stage 17b =

Cycling race stages

The 1960 Vuelta a España was the 15th edition of the Vuelta a España, one of cycling's Grand Tours. The Vuelta began in Gijón, with a team time trial on 29 April, and Stage 11 occurred on 9 May with a stage from Barbastro. The race finished in Bilbao on 15 May.

== Stage 10 ==
8 May 1960 - Barcelona to Barbastro, 240 km (150 mi)

Route:

Stage 10 result

Rank	Rider	Team	Time
1	Alfons Sweeck (BEL)	Groene Leeuw–Sinalco–SAS	7h 02' 37"
2	Armand Desmet (BEL)	Groene Leeuw–Sinalco–SAS	+ 40"
3	René Marigil (ESP)	Ferrys	+ 1' 10"
4	Fernando Manzaneque (ESP)	Faema	+ 1' 13"
5	José Urrestarazu (ESP)	Majestad	s.t.
6	José Gómez del Moral (ESP)	Licor 43	s.t.
7	Jesús Loroño (ESP)	Majestad	s.t.
8	Joaquín Barceló (ESP)	Licor 43	s.t.
9	Juan Manuel Menéndez (ESP)	Majestad	s.t.
10	Juan Campillo (ESP)	Kas–Boxing	+ 1' 18"

General classification after Stage 10

Rank	Rider	Team	Time
1	Armand Desmet (BEL)	Groene Leeuw–Sinalco–SAS	58h 18' 17"
2	Frans De Mulder (BEL)	Groene Leeuw–Sinalco–SAS	+ 10' 40"
3	Antonio Karmany (ESP)	Kas–Boxing	+ 14' 19"
4	Salvador Botella (ESP)	Faema	+ 18' 47"
5	Antonio Jiménez Quiles (ESP)	Kas–Boxing	+ 19' 11"
6	Fernando Manzaneque (ESP)	Faema	+ 20' 23"
7	Miguel Pacheco (ESP)	Licor 43	+ 22' 13"
8	Joan Escolà (ESP)	Ferrys	+ 27' 54"
9	Juan Campillo (ESP)	Kas–Boxing	+ 28' 38"
10	André Messelis (BEL)	Groene Leeuw–Sinalco–SAS	+ 34' 09"

== Stage 11 ==
9 May 1960 - Barbastro to Pamplona, 267 km (165.9 mi)

Route:

Stage 11 result

Rank	Rider	Team	Time
1	Vicente Iturat (ESP)	Ferrys	7h 24' 18"
2	Antonin Rolland (FRA)	Coupry–Margnat	+ 25"
3	Gabriel Mas (ESP)	Faema	+ 55"
4	Rogelio Hernández (ESP)	Kas–Boxing	s.t.
5	José Urrestarazu (ESP)	Majestad	s.t.
6	Gabriel Company (ESP)	Licor 43	s.t.
7	Carlo Guarguaglini (ITA)	EMI–Guerra	+ 1' 00"
8	Julio San Emeterio (ESP)	Faema	s.t.
9	Miguel Pacheco (ESP)	Licor 43	s.t.
10	Benigno Azpuru (ESP)	Kas–Boxing	+ 1' 04"

== Stage 12 ==
10 May 1960 - Pamplona to Logroño, 179 km (111.2 mi)

Route:

Stage 12 result

Rank	Rider	Team	Time
1	Jesús Galdeano (ESP)	Faema	4h 37' 33"
2	Arthur Decabooter (BEL)	Groene Leeuw–Sinalco–SAS	+ 40"
3	Alfons Sweeck (BEL)	Groene Leeuw–Sinalco–SAS	+ 1' 12"
4	Gabriel Mas (ESP)	Faema	s.t.
5	José Segú (ESP)	Kas–Boxing	+ 12' 10"
6	Antoine Abate (FRA)	Coupry–Margnat	+ 19' 24"
7	Vicente Iturat (ESP)	Ferrys	+ 25' 17"
8	Frans De Mulder (BEL)	Groene Leeuw–Sinalco–SAS	s.t.
9	Antonio Bertrán (ESP)	Faema	s.t.
10	Marcel Seynaeve (BEL)	Groene Leeuw–Sinalco–SAS	s.t.

General classification after Stage 12

Rank	Rider	Team	Time
1	Armand Desmet (BEL)	Groene Leeuw–Sinalco–SAS	71h 05' 42"
2	Miguel Pacheco (ESP)	Licor 43	+ 2' 56"
3	Frans De Mulder (BEL)	Groene Leeuw–Sinalco–SAS	+ 10' 40"
4	Gabriel Mas (ESP)	Faema	+ 13' 15"
5	Antonio Karmany (ESP)	Kas–Boxing	+ 14' 19"
6	Salvador Botella (ESP)	Faema	+ 18' 44"
7	Antonio Jiménez Quiles (ESP)	Kas–Boxing	+ 19' 11"
8	Fernando Manzaneque (ESP)	Faema	+ 20' 23"
9	Benigno Azpuru (ESP)	Kas–Boxing	+ 23' 08"
10	Arthur Decabooter (BEL)	Groene Leeuw–Sinalco–SAS	+ 25' 06"

== Stage 13 ==
11 May 1960 - Logroño to San Sebastián, 211 km (131 mi)

Route:

Stage 13 result

Rank	Rider	Team	Time
1	Federico Bahamontes (ESP)	Faema	6h 01' 59"
2	René Marigil (ESP)	Ferrys	+ 3' 02"
3	Frans De Mulder (BEL)	Groene Leeuw–Sinalco–SAS	+ 6' 06"
4	Jesús Loroño (ESP)	Majestad	s.t.
5	Aldo Moser (ITA)	EMI–Guerra	s.t.
6	Benigno Azpuru (ESP)	Kas–Boxing	s.t.
7	Antonio Suárez (ESP)	Faema	s.t.
8	Fernando Manzaneque (ESP)	Faema	s.t.
9	Antonio Jiménez Quiles (ESP)	Kas–Boxing	+ 7' 16"
10	Marcel Seynaeve (BEL)	Groene Leeuw–Sinalco–SAS	+ 7' 18"

General classification after Stage 13

Rank	Rider	Team	Time
1	Armand Desmet (BEL)	Groene Leeuw–Sinalco–SAS	77h 15' 04"
2	Miguel Pacheco (ESP)	Licor 43	+ 2' 56"
3	Frans De Mulder (BEL)	Groene Leeuw–Sinalco–SAS	+ 9' 23"
4	Gabriel Mas (ESP)	Faema	+ 13' 15"
5	Antonio Karmany (ESP)	Kas–Boxing	+ 14' 19"
6	Salvador Botella (ESP)	Faema	+ 18' 44"
7	Antonio Jiménez Quiles (ESP)	Kas–Boxing	+ 19' 04"
8	Fernando Manzaneque (ESP)	Faema	+ 19' 06"
9	Benigno Azpuru (ESP)	Kas–Boxing	+ 21' 51"
10	André Messelis (BEL)	Groene Leeuw–Sinalco–SAS	+ 26' 58"

== Stage 14 ==
12 May 1960 - San Sebastián to Vitoria, 263 km (163 mi)

Route:

Stage 14 result

Rank	Rider	Team	Time
1	Antonio Suárez (ESP)	Faema	8h 07' 41"
2	Federico Bahamontes (ESP)	Faema	+ 12' 05"
3	Vicente Iturat (ESP)	Ferrys	+ 14' 12"
4	Benigno Azpuru (ESP)	Kas–Boxing	+ 14' 44"
5	Juan Campillo (ESP)	Kas–Boxing	+ 15' 55"
6	Antonio Karmany (ESP)	Kas–Boxing	s.t.
7	Carmelo Morales (ESP)	Kas–Boxing	+ 16' 37"
8	Salvador Botella (ESP)	Faema	+ 17' 46"
9	Antonio Jiménez Quiles (ESP)	Kas–Boxing	s.t.
10	Jesús Loroño (ESP)	Majestad	s.t.

General classification after Stage 14

Rank	Rider	Team	Time
1	Armand Desmet (BEL)	Groene Leeuw–Sinalco–SAS	85h 40' 31"
2	Miguel Pacheco (ESP)	Licor 43	+ 2' 56"
3	Frans De Mulder (BEL)	Groene Leeuw–Sinalco–SAS	+ 12' 04"
4	Antonio Karmany (ESP)	Kas–Boxing	+ 12' 28"
5	Gabriel Mas (ESP)	Faema	+ 13' 15"
6	Salvador Botella (ESP)	Faema	+ 18' 44"
7	Benigno Azpuru (ESP)	Kas–Boxing	+ 18' 49"
8	Antonio Jiménez Quiles (ESP)	Kas–Boxing	+ 19' 04"
9	Fernando Manzaneque (ESP)	Faema	+ 19' 59"
10	Juan Campillo (ESP)	Kas–Boxing	+ 26' 47"

== Stage 15 ==
13 May 1960 - Vitoria to Santander, 232 km (144 mi)

Route:

Stage 15 result

Rank	Rider	Team	Time
1	Arthur Decabooter (BEL)	Groene Leeuw–Sinalco–SAS	6h 31' 17"
2	Frans De Mulder (BEL)	Groene Leeuw–Sinalco–SAS	+ 2' 27"
3	Salvador Botella (ESP)	Faema	+ 2' 57"
4	Marcel Seynaeve (BEL)	Groene Leeuw–Sinalco–SAS	s.t.
5	Juan Campillo (ESP)	Kas–Boxing	+ 3' 59"
6	André Messelis (BEL)	Groene Leeuw–Sinalco–SAS	s.t.
7	Antonio Suárez (ESP)	Faema	s.t.
8	Carmelo Morales (ESP)	Kas–Boxing	s.t.
9	Armand Desmet (BEL)	Groene Leeuw–Sinalco–SAS	s.t.
10	Jesús Loroño (ESP)	Majestad	s.t.

General classification after Stage 15

Rank	Rider	Team	Time
1	Armand Desmet (BEL)	Groene Leeuw–Sinalco–SAS	92h 14' 47"
2	Miguel Pacheco (ESP)	Licor 43	+ 2' 56"
3	Frans De Mulder (BEL)	Groene Leeuw–Sinalco–SAS	+ 11' 32"
4	Antonio Karmany (ESP)	Kas–Boxing	+ 12' 28"
5	Salvador Botella (ESP)	Faema	+ 18' 32"
6	Benigno Azpuru (ESP)	Kas–Boxing	+ 18' 49"
7	Fernando Manzaneque (ESP)	Faema	+ 19' 59"
8	Juan Campillo (ESP)	Kas–Boxing	+ 26' 47"
9	André Messelis (BEL)	Groene Leeuw–Sinalco–SAS	+ 29' 58"
10	Arthur Decabooter (BEL)	Groene Leeuw–Sinalco–SAS	+ 34' 41"

== Stage 16 ==
14 May 1960 - Santander to Bilbao, 192 km (119 mi)

Route:

Stage 16 result

Rank	Rider	Team	Time
1	Frans De Mulder (BEL)	Groene Leeuw–Sinalco–SAS	5h 32' 31"
2	Jesús Loroño (ESP)	Majestad	+ 30"
3	Carmelo Morales (ESP)	Kas–Boxing	+ 10' 23"
4	Juan Campillo (ESP)	Kas–Boxing	+ 12' 22"
5	Antonio Suárez (ESP)	Faema	+ 12' 25"
6	José Gómez del Moral (ESP)	Licor 43	s.t.
7	Fernando Manzaneque (ESP)	Faema	+ 12' 27"
8	Armand Desmet (BEL)	Groene Leeuw–Sinalco–SAS	s.t.
9	Antonin Rolland (FRA)	Coupry–Margnat	s.t.
10	Salvador Botella (ESP)	Faema	s.t.

General classification after Stage 16

Rank	Rider	Team	Time
1	Frans De Mulder (BEL)	Groene Leeuw–Sinalco–SAS	97h 58' 50"
2	Armand Desmet (BEL)	Groene Leeuw–Sinalco–SAS	+ 53"
3	Miguel Pacheco (ESP)	Licor 43	+ 3' 51"
4	Antonio Karmany (ESP)	Kas–Boxing	+ 13' 23"
5	Salvador Botella (ESP)	Faema	+ 19' 44"
6	Benigno Azpuru (ESP)	Kas–Boxing	+ 19' 48"
7	Fernando Manzaneque (ESP)	Faema	+ 20' 54"
8	Juan Campillo (ESP)	Kas–Boxing	+ 27' 37"
9	Jesús Loroño (ESP)	Majestad	+ 28' 50"
10	André Messelis (BEL)	Groene Leeuw–Sinalco–SAS	+ 34' 58"

== Stage 17a ==
15 May 1960 - Bilbao to Guernica, 116 km (72 mi)

Route:

Stage 17a result

Rank	Rider	Team	Time
1	Frans De Mulder (BEL)	Groene Leeuw–Sinalco–SAS	3h 26' 23"
2	Arthur Decabooter (BEL)	Groene Leeuw–Sinalco–SAS	+ 31"
3	Juan Campillo (ESP)	Kas–Boxing	+ 47"
4	Antonio Suárez (ESP)	Faema	+ 11' 30"
5	Antonio Bertrán (ESP)	Faema	+ 14' 00"
6	René Marigil (ESP)	Ferrys	s.t.
7	Ángel Guardiola Ortiz (ESP)	Licor 43	s.t.
8	André Messelis (BEL)	Groene Leeuw–Sinalco–SAS	s.t.
9	Constant De Keyser (BEL)	Groene Leeuw–Sinalco–SAS	s.t.
10	Benigno Azpuru (ESP)	Kas–Boxing	s.t.

== Stage 17b ==
16 May 1960 - Guernica to Bilbao, 53 km (33 mi) (ITT)

Route:

Stage 17b result

Rank	Rider	Team	Time
1	Antonio Karmany (ESP)	Kas–Boxing	1h 35' 24"
2	Jesús Loroño (ESP)	Majestad	+ 41"
3	Antonio Suárez (ESP)	Faema	+ 1' 36"
4	Fernando Manzaneque (ESP)	Faema	+ 2' 14"
5	André Messelis (BEL)	Groene Leeuw–Sinalco–SAS	+ 3' 00"
6	Salvador Botella (ESP)	Faema	+ 4' 41"
7	Frans De Mulder (BEL)	Groene Leeuw–Sinalco–SAS	+ 5' 20"
8	René Marigil (ESP)	Ferrys	+ 5' 24"
9	Alfons Sweeck (BEL)	Groene Leeuw–Sinalco–SAS	+ 5' 33"
10	Joseph Aure (FRA)	Coupry–Margnat	+ 5' 43"

General classification after Stage 17b

Rank	Rider	Team	Time
1	Frans De Mulder (BEL)	Groene Leeuw–Sinalco–SAS	103h 05' 57"
2	Armand Desmet (BEL)	Groene Leeuw–Sinalco–SAS	+ 15' 27"
3	Miguel Pacheco (ESP)	Licor 43	+ 19' 30"
4	Antonio Karmany (ESP)	Kas–Boxing	+ 22' 03"
5	Juan Campillo (ESP)	Kas–Boxing	+ 29' 50"
6	Fernando Manzaneque (ESP)	Faema	+ 31' 58"
7	Salvador Botella (ESP)	Faema	+ 32' 58"
8	Benigno Azpuru (ESP)	Kas–Boxing	+ 35' 08"
9	Jesús Loroño (ESP)	Majestad	+ 38' 11"
10	Arthur Decabooter (BEL)	Groene Leeuw–Sinalco–SAS	+ 44' 42"
