= 1962 Omloop Het Volk =

Race details
- Dates: 10 March 1962
- Stages: 1
- Distance: 218 km (135 mi)
- Winning time: 5h 37' 00"

Results
| | Winner | Robert De Middeleir (BEL) |
| | Second | Jean-Baptiste Claes (BEL) |
| | Third | Roger De Coninck (BEL) |

The 1962 Omloop Het Volk was the 17th edition of the Omloop Het Volk cycle race and was held on 10 March 1962. The race started and finished in Ghent. The race was won by Robert De Middeleir.

== General classification ==
Final general classification
| Rank | Rider | Time |
|---|---|---|
| 1 | Robert De Middeleir (BEL) | 5h 37' 00" |
| 2 | Jean-Baptiste Claes (BEL) | + 1' 45" |
| 3 | Roger De Coninck (BEL) | + 2' 10" |
| 4 | Robert Vandecaveye (BEL) | + 2' 48" |
| 5 | Frans De Mulder (BEL) | + 2' 48" |
| 6 | Norbert Kerckhove (BEL) | + 2' 48" |
| 7 | Robert Lelangue (BEL) | + 2' 48" |
| 8 | Dieter Puschel (FRG) | + 2' 48" |
| 9 | Jan Zagers (BEL) | + 2' 48" |
| 10 | Victor Van Schil (BEL) | + 2' 48" |
