= 2016–17 Cyclo-cross DVV Trophy =

2016-17 season-long cycling competition

Details
- Location: Belgium
- Races: 8

Champions
- Individual champion: Wout van Aert (BEL) (Crelan–Vastgoedservice & Vérandas Willems–Crelan (Note: In the 2016 races, van Aert rode for Crelan–Vastgoedservice, and for Vérandas Willems–Crelan in the 2017 races.))
- Female individual champion: Sanne Cant (BEL) (IKO Enertherm–Beobank)

The DVV Trophy 2016–17 is a season long cyclo-cross competition. This edition continues to follow the ranking system which uses time instead of points.

== Calendar ==
=== Men's competition ===
Date	Race	Location	Winner	Team	Competition leader	Ref
9 October	GP Mario De Clercq	Ronse	Wout van Aert (BEL)	Crelan–Vastgoedservice	Wout van Aert (BEL)	
1 November	Koppenbergcross	Oudenaarde	Wout van Aert (BEL)	Crelan–Vastgoedservice	Wout van Aert (BEL)	
27 November	Flandrien Cross	Hamme	Mathieu van der Poel (NED)	Beobank–Corendon	Wout van Aert (BEL)	
10 December	Grand Prix Rouwmoer	Essen	Wout van Aert (BEL)	Crelan–Vastgoedservice	Wout van Aert (BEL)	
17 December	Soudal Scheldecross Antwerp	Antwerp	Mathieu van der Poel (NED)	Beobank–Corendon	Wout van Aert (BEL)	
29 December	Azencross	Loenhout	Wout van Aert (BEL)	Crelan–Vastgoedservice	Wout van Aert (BEL)	
1 January	Grand Prix Sven Nys	Baal	Toon Aerts (BEL)	Telenet–Fidea Lions	Wout van Aert (BEL)	
4 February	Krawatencross	Lille	Mathieu van der Poel (NED)	Beobank–Corendon	Wout van Aert (BEL)	

=== Women's competition ===
Date	Race	Location	Winner	Team	Competition leader	Ref
9 October	GP Mario De Clercq	Ronse	Thalita de Jong (NED)	Rabobank-Liv Woman Cycling Team	Thalita de Jong (NED)	
1 November	Koppenbergcross	Oudenaarde	Jolien Verschueren (BEL)	Young Telenet Fidea	Thalita de Jong (NED)	
27 November	Flandrien Cross	Hamme	Sanne Cant (BEL)	IKO Enertherm–Beobank	Thalita de Jong (NED)	
10 December	Grand Prix Rouwmoer	Essen	Sanne Cant (BEL)	IKO Enertherm–Beobank	Thalita de Jong (NED)	
17 December	Soudal Scheldecross Antwerp	Antwerp	Sanne Cant (BEL)	IKO Enertherm–Beobank	Thalita de Jong (NED)	
29 December	Azencross	Loenhout	Sanne Cant (BEL)	IKO Enertherm–Beobank	Thalita de Jong (NED)	
1 January	Grand Prix Sven Nys	Baal	Marianne Vos (NED)	WM3 Energie	Thalita de Jong (NED)	
4 February	Krawatencross	Lille	Maud Kaptheijns (NED)	Steylaerts–Verona	Sanne Cant (BEL)	

== Rankings ==
=== Men ===
==== GP Mario De Clercq ====
Result
Rank	Rider	Team	Time
1	Wout van Aert (BEL)	Crelan–Vastgoedservice	1h 02' 01"
2	Jens Adams (BEL)	Crelan–Vastgoedservice	+ 31"
3	Michael Vanthourenhout (BEL)	Marlux–Napoleon Games	+ 36"
4	Mathieu van der Poel (NED)	Beobank–Corendon	+ 55"
5	Kevin Pauwels (BEL)	Marlux–Napoleon Games	+ 58"
6	Lars van der Haar (NED)	Team Giant–Alpecin	+ 1' 04"
7	Toon Aerts (BEL)	Telenet–Fidea Lions	+ 1' 15"
8	Klaas Vantornout (BEL)	Marlux–Napoleon Games	+ 1' 33"
9	Tom Meeusen (BEL)	Telenet–Fidea Lions	+ 1' 38"
10	Gianni Vermeersch (BEL)	Team Steylaerts	+ 1' 54"

General classification after GP Mario De Clercq
Rank	Rider	Team	Time
1	Wout van Aert (BEL)	Crelan–Vastgoedservice	1h 02' 01"
2	Jens Adams (BEL)	Crelan–Vastgoedservice	+ 41"
3	Michael Vanthourenhout (BEL)	Marlux–Napoleon Games	+ 46"
4	Kevin Pauwels (BEL)	Marlux–Napoleon Games	+ 1' 08"
5	Mathieu van der Poel (NED)	Beobank–Corendon	+ 1' 10"
6	Lars van der Haar (NED)	Team Giant–Alpecin	+ 1' 19"
7	Toon Aerts (BEL)	Telenet–Fidea Lions	+ 1' 30"
8	Klaas Vantornout (BEL)	Marlux–Napoleon Games	+ 1' 48"
9	Tom Meeusen (BEL)	Telenet–Fidea Lions	+ 1' 48"
10	Gianni Vermeersch (BEL)	Team Steylaerts	+ 1' 53"

==== Koppenbergcross ====
Result
Rank	Rider	Team	Time
1	Wout van Aert (BEL)	Crelan–Vastgoedservice	1h 03' 08"
2	Kevin Pauwels (BEL)	Marlux–Napoleon Games	+ 29"
3	Lars van der Haar (NED)	Team Giant–Alpecin	+ 34"
4	Toon Aerts (BEL)	Telenet–Fidea Lions	+ 46"
5	Klaas Vantornout (BEL)	Marlux–Napoleon Games	+ 56"
6	Michael Vanthourenhout (BEL)	Marlux–Napoleon Games	+ 1' 04"
7	Corné van Kessel (NED)	Telenet–Fidea Lions	+ 1' 14"
8	Jens Adams (BEL)	Crelan–Vastgoedservice	+ 1' 18"
9	Laurens Sweeck (BEL)	ERA Real Estate–Circus	+ 1' 34"
10	Michael Boroš (CZE)	ERA Real Estate–Circus	+ 1' 44"

General classification after Koppenbergcross
Rank	Rider	Team	Time
1	Wout van Aert (BEL)	Crelan–Vastgoedservice	2h 04' 39"
2	Kevin Pauwels (BEL)	Marlux–Napoleon Games	+ 1' 52"
3	Michael Vanthourenhout (BEL)	Marlux–Napoleon Games	+ 2' 00"
4	Lars van der Haar (NED)	Team Giant–Alpecin	+ 2' 08"
5	Jens Adams (BEL)	Crelan–Vastgoedservice	+ 2' 19"
6	Toon Aerts (BEL)	Telenet–Fidea Lions	+ 2' 21"
7	Klaas Vantornout (BEL)	Marlux–Napoleon Games	+ 2' 54"
8	Corné van Kessel (NED)	Telenet–Fidea Lions	+ 3' 38"
9	Tom Meeusen (BEL)	Telenet–Fidea Lions	+ 4' 16"
10	Laurens Sweeck (BEL)	ERA Real Estate–Circus	+ 4' 34"

==== Flandriencross ====
Result
Rank	Rider	Team	Time
1	Mathieu van der Poel (NED)	Beobank–Corendon	57' 50"
2	Wout van Aert (BEL)	Crelan–Vastgoedservice	+ 6"
3	Laurens Sweeck (BEL)	ERA Real Estate–Circus	+ 7"
4	Kevin Pauwels (BEL)	Marlux–Napoleon Games	+ 20"
5	Corné van Kessel (NED)	Telenet–Fidea Lions	+ 28"
6	Michael Vanthourenhout (BEL)	Marlux–Napoleon Games	+ 29"
7	Tim Merlier (BEL)	Crelan–Vastgoedservice	+ 1' 16"
8	Gianni Vermeersch (BEL)	Team Steylaerts	+ 1' 18"
9	Toon Aerts (BEL)	Telenet–Fidea Lions	+ 1' 29"
10	Jim Aernouts (BEL)	Telenet–Fidea Lions	+ 1' 53"

General classification after Flandriencross
Rank	Rider	Team	Time
1	Wout van Aert (BEL)	Crelan–Vastgoedservice	3h 02' 35"
2	Kevin Pauwels (BEL)	Marlux–Napoleon Games	+ 2' 06"
3	Michael Vanthourenhout (BEL)	Marlux–Napoleon Games	+ 2' 23"
4	Toon Aerts (BEL)	Telenet–Fidea Lions	+ 3' 44"
5	Corné van Kessel (NED)	Telenet–Fidea Lions	+ 4' 00"
6	Laurens Sweeck (BEL)	ERA Real Estate–Circus	+ 4' 30"
7	Mathieu van der Poel (NED)	Beobank–Corendon	+ 4' 55"
8	Klaas Vantornout (BEL)	Marlux–Napoleon Games	+ 5' 49"
9	Tom Meeusen (BEL)	Telenet–Fidea Lions	+ 6' 11"
10	Lars van der Haar (NED)	Team Giant–Alpecin	+ 7' 02"

==== Grand Prix Rouwmoer ====
Result
Rank	Rider	Team	Time
1	Wout van Aert (BEL)	Crelan–Vastgoedservice	1h 00' 56"
2	Kevin Pauwels (BEL)	Marlux–Napoleon Games	+ 18"
3	Tom Meeusen (BEL)	Telenet–Fidea Lions	+ 38"
4	Laurens Sweeck (BEL)	ERA Real Estate–Circus	+ 39"
5	Toon Aerts (BEL)	Telenet–Fidea Lions	+ 39"
6	Corné van Kessel (NED)	Telenet–Fidea Lions	+ 40"
7	Michael Vanthourenhout (BEL)	Marlux–Napoleon Games	+ 41"
8	Gianni Vermeersch (BEL)	Team Steylaerts	+ 41"
9	Wietse Bosmans (BEL)	Beobank–Corendon	+ 43"
10	Jens Adams (BEL)	Crelan–Vastgoedservice	+ 1' 12"

General classification after Grand Prix Rouwmoer
Rank	Rider	Team	Time
1	Wout van Aert (BEL)	Crelan–Vastgoedservice	4h 03' 16"
2	Kevin Pauwels (BEL)	Marlux–Napoleon Games	+ 2' 34"
3	Michael Vanthourenhout (BEL)	Marlux–Napoleon Games	+ 3' 19"
4	Toon Aerts (BEL)	Telenet–Fidea Lions	+ 4' 28"
5	Corné van Kessel (NED)	Telenet–Fidea Lions	+ 4' 55"
6	Laurens Sweeck (BEL)	ERA Real Estate–Circus	+ 5' 24"
7	Tom Meeusen (BEL)	Telenet–Fidea Lions	+ 7' 04"
8	Gianni Vermeersch (BEL)	Team Steylaerts	+ 8' 27"
9	Mathieu van der Poel (NED)	Beobank–Corendon	+ 8' 31"
10	Jens Adams (BEL)	Crelan–Vastgoedservice	+ 8' 40"

==== Scheldecross Antwerpen ====
Result
Rank	Rider	Team	Time
1	Mathieu van der Poel (NED)	Beobank–Corendon	1h 05' 31"
2	Wout van Aert (BEL)	Crelan–Vastgoedservice	+ 4"
3	Kevin Pauwels (BEL)	Marlux–Napoleon Games	+ 6"
4	Laurens Sweeck (BEL)	ERA Real Estate–Circus	+ 9"
5	Jens Adams (BEL)	Crelan–Vastgoedservice	+ 10"
6	Michael Vanthourenhout (BEL)	Marlux–Napoleon Games	+ 12"
7	Toon Aerts (BEL)	Telenet–Fidea Lions	+ 16"
8	Corné van Kessel (NED)	Telenet–Fidea Lions	+ 52"
9	Tim Merlier (BEL)	Crelan–Vastgoedservice	+ 1' 07"
10	Vincent Baestaens (BEL)	Beobank–Corendon	+ 1' 52"

General classification after Scheldecross Antwerpen
Rank	Rider	Team	Time
1	Wout van Aert (BEL)	Crelan–Vastgoedservice	5h 08' 51"
2	Kevin Pauwels (BEL)	Marlux–Napoleon Games	+ 2' 36"
3	Michael Vanthourenhout (BEL)	Marlux–Napoleon Games	+ 3' 22"
4	Toon Aerts (BEL)	Telenet–Fidea Lions	+ 4' 30"
5	Laurens Sweeck (BEL)	ERA Real Estate–Circus	+ 5' 29"
6	Corné van Kessel (NED)	Telenet–Fidea Lions	+ 5' 43"
7	Mathieu van der Poel (NED)	Beobank–Corendon	+ 8' 12"
8	Jens Adams (BEL)	Crelan–Vastgoedservice	+ 8' 46"
9	Tom Meeusen (BEL)	Telenet–Fidea Lions	+ 9' 32"
10	Gianni Vermeersch (BEL)	Team Steylaerts	+ 10' 29"

==== Azencross ====
Result
Rank	Rider	Team	Time
1	Wout van Aert (BEL)	Crelan–Vastgoedservice	1h 01' 33"
2	Tom Meeusen (BEL)	Telenet–Fidea Lions	+ 2"
3	Kevin Pauwels (BEL)	Marlux–Napoleon Games	+ 3"
4	Toon Aerts (BEL)	Telenet–Fidea Lions	+ 6"
5	Michael Vanthourenhout (BEL)	Marlux–Napoleon Games	+ 11"
6	Corné van Kessel (NED)	Telenet–Fidea Lions	+ 22"
7	Clément Venturini (FRA)	Cofidis	+ 41"
8	Jens Adams (BEL)	Crelan–Vastgoedservice	+ 55"
9	Jim Aernouts (BEL)	Telenet–Fidea Lions	+ 1' 01"
10	Tim Merlier (BEL)	Crelan–Vastgoedservice	+ 1' 12"

General classification after Azencross
Rank	Rider	Team	Time
1	Wout van Aert (BEL)	Crelan–Vastgoedservice	6h 10' 24"
2	Kevin Pauwels (BEL)	Marlux–Napoleon Games	+ 2' 39"
3	Michael Vanthourenhout (BEL)	Marlux–Napoleon Games	+ 3' 33"
4	Toon Aerts (BEL)	Telenet–Fidea Lions	+ 4' 21"
5	Corné van Kessel (NED)	Telenet–Fidea Lions	+ 6' 05"
6	Laurens Sweeck (BEL)	ERA Real Estate–Circus	+ 6' 51"
7	Tom Meeusen (BEL)	Telenet–Fidea Lions	+ 9' 34"
8	Jens Adams (BEL)	Crelan–Vastgoedservice	+ 9' 41"
9	Gianni Vermeersch (BEL)	Team Steylaerts	+ 12' 42"
10	Mathieu van der Poel (NED)	Beobank–Corendon	+ 13' 02"

==== Grand Prix Sven Nys ====
Result
Rank	Rider	Team	Time
1	Toon Aerts (BEL)	Telenet–Fidea Lions	1h 02' 51"
2	Wout van Aert (BEL)	Vérandas Willems–Crelan	+ 8"
3	Michael Vanthourenhout (BEL)	Marlux–Napoleon Games	+ 13"
4	Kevin Pauwels (BEL)	Marlux–Napoleon Games	+ 31"
5	Wietse Bosmans (BEL)	Beobank–Corendon	+ 50"
6	Tim Merlier (BEL)	Vérandas Willems–Crelan	+ 1' 29"
7	Corné van Kessel (NED)	Telenet–Fidea Lions	+ 1' 41"
8	Jens Adams (BEL)	Vérandas Willems–Crelan	+ 1' 41"
9	Laurens Sweeck (BEL)	ERA–Circus	+ 2' 08"
10	Gianni Vermeersch (BEL)	Team Steylaerts	+ 2' 11"

General classification after Grand Prix Sven Nys
Rank	Rider	Team	Time
1	Wout van Aert (BEL)	Vérandas Willems–Crelan	7h 13' 18"
2	Kevin Pauwels (BEL)	Marlux–Napoleon Games	+ 3' 07"
3	Michael Vanthourenhout (BEL)	Marlux–Napoleon Games	+ 3' 43"
4	Toon Aerts (BEL)	Telenet–Fidea Lions	+ 4' 03"
5	Corné van Kessel (NED)	Telenet–Fidea Lions	+ 7' 43"
6	Laurens Sweeck (BEL)	ERA–Circus	+ 8' 56"
7	Jens Adams (BEL)	Vérandas Willems–Crelan	+ 11' 19"
8	Tom Meeusen (BEL)	Telenet–Fidea Lions	+ 11' 32"
9	Tim Merlier (BEL)	Vérandas Willems–Crelan	+ 14' 32"
10	Gianni Vermeersch (BEL)	Team Steylaerts	+ 14' 50"

==== Krawatencross ====
Result
Rank	Rider	Team	Time
1	Mathieu van der Poel (NED)	Beobank–Corendon	1h 02' 40"
2	Wout van Aert (BEL)	Vérandas Willems–Crelan	+ 4"
3	Tom Meeusen (BEL)	Telenet–Fidea Lions	+ 4"
4	Kevin Pauwels (BEL)	Marlux–Napoleon Games	+ 4"
5	Lars van der Haar (NED)	Telenet–Fidea Lions	+ 4"
6	Corné van Kessel (NED)	Telenet–Fidea Lions	+ 42"
7	Michael Vanthourenhout (BEL)	Marlux–Napoleon Games	+ 1' 01"
8	Gianni Vermeersch (BEL)	Team Steylaerts	+ 1' 03"
9	Vincent Baestaens (BEL)	Beobank–Corendon	+ 1' 10"
10	David van der Poel (NED)	Beobank–Corendon	+ 1' 10"

Final General classification
Rank	Rider	Team	Time
1	Wout van Aert (BEL)	Vérandas Willems–Crelan	8h 15' 47"
2	Kevin Pauwels (BEL)	Marlux–Napoleon Games	+ 3' 22"
3	Michael Vanthourenhout (BEL)	Marlux–Napoleon Games	+ 4' 55"
4	Corné van Kessel (NED)	Telenet–Fidea Lions	+ 8' 36"
5	Toon Aerts (BEL)	Telenet–Fidea Lions	+ 9' 14"
6	Laurens Sweeck (BEL)	ERA–Circus	+ 10' 42"
7	Tom Meeusen (BEL)	Telenet–Fidea Lions	+ 11' 37"
8	Jens Adams (BEL)	Vérandas Willems–Crelan	+ 13' 29"
9	Tim Merlier (BEL)	Vérandas Willems–Crelan	+ 15' 56"
10	Gianni Vermeersch (BEL)	Team Steylaerts	+ 16' 04"

=== Women ===
==== Overall standings ====
	Rider	Team(s)	Time
1	Sanne Cant (BEL)	IKO Enertherm–Beobank	5h 50' 35"
2	Thalita de Jong (NED)	Rabobank-Liv Woman Cycling Team; Lares–Waowdeals	+ 4' 28"
3	Ellen Van Loy (BEL)	Telenet–Fidea Lions	+ 5' 48"
4	Maud Kaptheijns (NED)	Team Steylaerts	+ 7' 32"
5	Laura Verdonschot (BEL)	Marlux–Napoleon Games	+ 8' 11"
