= Guarguaglini =

Guarguaglini is a surname. Notable people with the surname include:

- Carlo Guarguaglini (1933–2010), Italian racing cyclist
- Pier Francesco Guarguaglini (1937–2026), Italian engineer, university educator, and businessman
