= Diether Sweeck =

Belgian cyclist

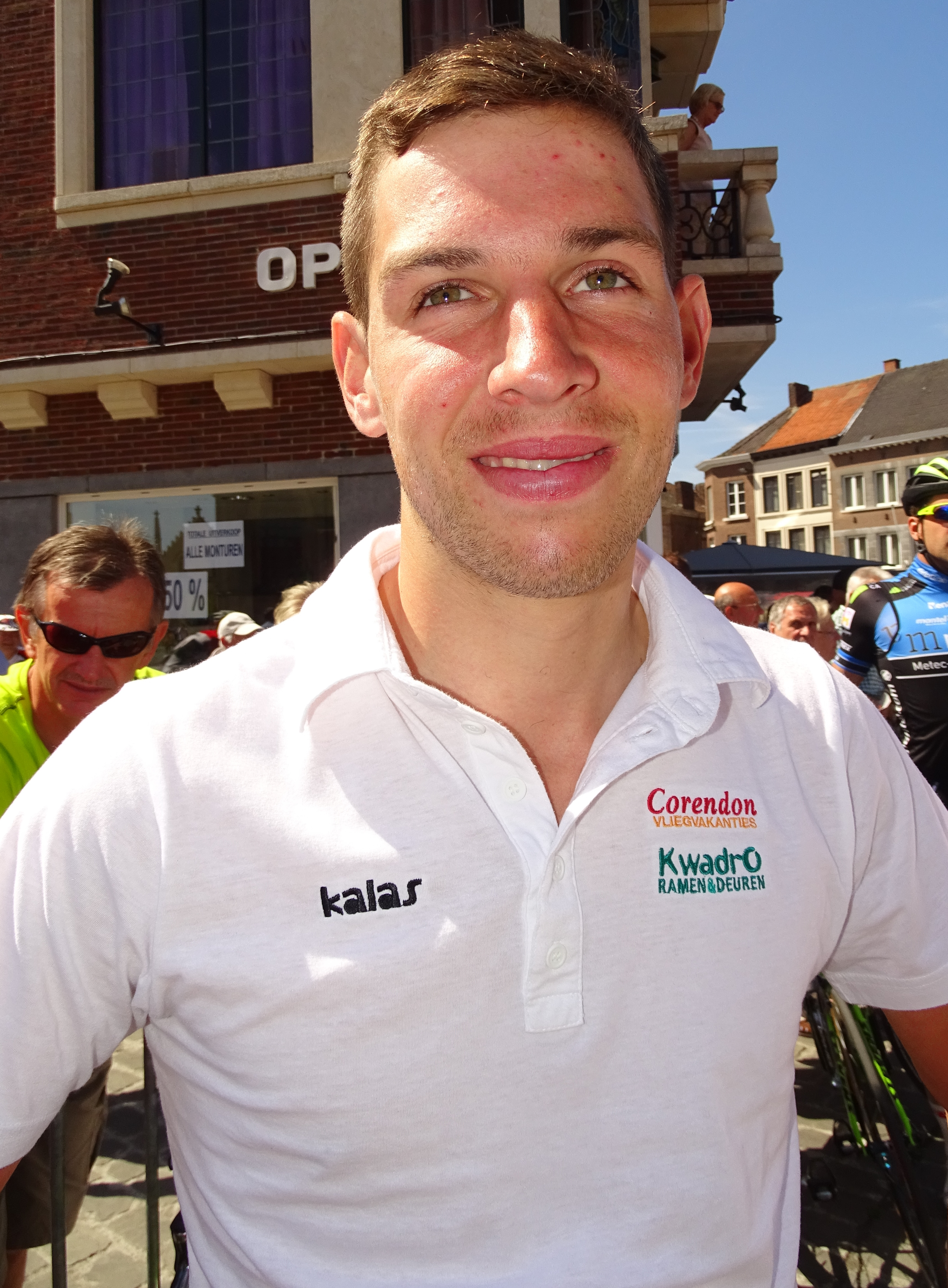
- Sweeck in 2015

Personal information
- Full name: Diether Sweeck
- Born: 17 December 1993 (age 32) Leuven, Belgium
- Height: 1.80 m (5 ft 11 in)
- Weight: 71 kg (157 lb)

Cycling career
- Sport: Cycling
- Disciplines: Cyclo-cross; Road
- Role: Rider

Amateur team
- 2013: KDL–Trans

Professional teams
- 2014–2017: Kwadro–Stannah
- 2018–2019: Pauwels Sauzen–Vastgoedservice
- 2019–2020: Pauwels Sauzen–Bingoal
- 2020–2021: Alpecin–Fenix (road)
- 2020–2022: Credishop–Fristads (cyclo-cross)
- 2021: Alpecin–Fenix Development Team (road)

Diether Sweeck (born 17 December 1993 in Leuven) is a Belgian cyclist, who last rode for UCI Cyclo-cross team IKO–Crelan.

Sweeck is the grandson of former cyclist Alfons Sweeck. His twin brother Laurens Sweeck and his older brother Hendrick Sweeck are also professional cyclists.

== Major results ==
2009–2010
1st Villarcayo Juniors
1st Medina de Pomar Juniors
2010–2011
Under-23 Superprestige

1st Hoogstraten
2nd Hamme-Zogge
2nd Middelkerke

Under-23 Gazet van Antwerpen

1st Hasselt

2011–2012
1st Medina de Pomar
2013–2014
3rd Zonnebeke
2014–2015
Under-23 BPost Bank Trophy

1st Hasselt
2nd Loenhout

1st Oostmalle Under-23
2nd Nommay
6th UEC European Under-23 Championships
8th UCI Under-23 World Championships
2015–2016
3rd Zonnebeke
2016–2017
Toi Toi Cup

2nd Uničov

3rd Iowa City Day 3
2017–2018
2nd Kasteelcross Zonnebeke
Toi Toi Cup

2nd Kolín

2nd Las Vegas
2018–2019
1st Iowa City Day 1
Toi Toi Cup

1st Mladá Boleslav
1st Kolín

3rd Zonnebeke
3rd Vic
2019–2020
Toi Toi Cup

1st Kolín
1st Uničov

2nd Elorrio
2nd Rochester Day 1
2nd Rochester Day 2
2022–2023
1st Brumath
