= 1962 Harelbeke–Antwerp–Harelbeke =

Race details
- Dates: 17 March 1962
- Stages: 1
- Distance: 213 km (132 mi)
- Winning time: 5h 53' 00"

Results
	Winner	André Messelis (BEL)
	Second	Leopold Schaeken (BEL)
	Third	Frans De Mulder (BEL)

The 1962 Harelbeke–Antwerp–Harelbeke (Note: The race was known as Harelbeke–Antwerp–Harelbeke (French: Harelbeke–Anvers–Harelbeke) for the first twelve editions. In 1970, the race became known as the E3, after the Belgian road which is now known as the E17.) was the fifth edition of the E3 Harelbeke cycle race and was held on 17 March 1962. The race started and finished in Harelbeke. The race was won by André Messelis.

== General classification ==
Final general classification

Rank	Rider	Time
1	André Messelis (BEL)	5h 53' 00"
2	Leopold Schaeken (BEL)	+ 1' 20"
3	Frans De Mulder (BEL)	+ 1' 20"
4	Martin Van Geneugden (BEL)	+ 1' 20"
5	Roger Baens (BEL)	+ 1' 20"
6	René Van Meenen (BEL)	+ 1' 20"
7	Jan Zagers (BEL)	+ 1' 20"
8	Henri Schaerlaeckens (BEL)	+ 1' 20"
9	Romain van Wynsberghe (BEL)	+ 1' 20"
10	Yvan Covent (BEL)	+ 1' 20"
