= Tour of Belgium =

Belgian multi-day road cycling race

- Tour of Belgium

Race details
- Date: Late-May
- Region: Belgium
- English name: Tour of Belgium
- Local name(s): Ronde van België (in Dutch); Tour de Belgique (in French) Baloise Belgium Tour
- Discipline: Road
- Competition: UCI ProSeries
- Type: Stage race
- Race director: Jan Nys (Golazo Sports)
- Web site: baloisebelgiumtour.be

History
- First edition: 1908
- Editions: 94 (as of 2025)
- First winner: Lucien Petit-Breton (FRA)
- Most wins: Tony Martin (GER) (3 wins)
- Most recent: Filippo Baroncini (ITA)

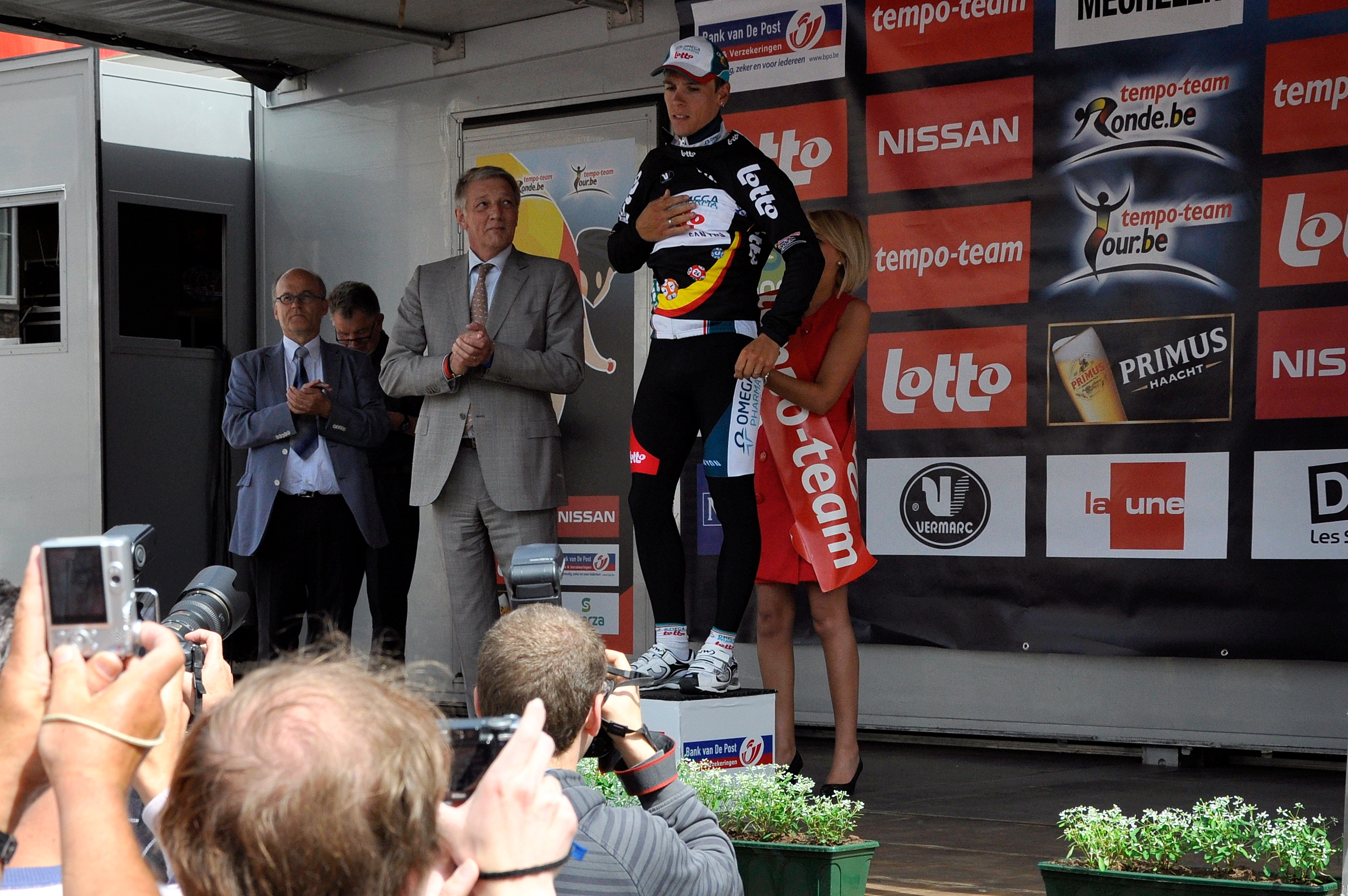
Philippe Gilbert as leader in Mechelen, 2010

The Tour of Belgium (Dutch: Ronde van België; French: Tour de Belgique) is a five-day bicycle race which is held annually in Belgium, and is part of the UCI ProSeries.

It was held annually between 1908 and 1981, except during both world wars. Between 1982 and 1990 several races were not organised and none at all from 1991 to 2001. From 2002 onwards the race has again become an annual fixture on the cycling calendar.

Following the start of the UCI ProTour in 2005 it looked like the race would merge with the Eneco Tour; however this did not happen and it became part of the UCI Europe Tour competition.

== Winners ==
Twelve riders have managed to win the Tour of Belgium more than once. The most successful rider is German rider Tony Martin, who won three consecutive editions between 2012 and 2014.

=== By year ===
Year	Country	Rider	Team
1908	France	Lucien Petit-Breton	Peugeot–Wolber
1909	France	Paul Duboc	Alcyon–Dunlop
1910	Belgium	Jules Masselis	Alcyon–Dunlop
1911	Belgium	René Vandenberghe	Alcyon–Dunlop
1912	Belgium	Odile Defraye	Alcyon–Dunlop
1913	Belgium	Dieudonné Gauthy	Alcyon–Soly
1914	Belgium	Louis Mottiat	Alcyon–Soly
1915– 1918	No race due to World War I		
1919	Belgium	Émile Masson	Alcyon
1920	Belgium	Louis Mottiat	Alcyon
1921	Belgium	René Vermandel	individual
1922	Belgium	René Vermandel	Alcyon–Dunlop
1923	Belgium	Émile Masson	Alcyon–Dunlop
1924	Belgium	Félix Sellier	Alcyon–Dunlop
1925	Belgium	Denis Verschueren	Wonder
1926	Belgium	Jean De Busschere	Alcyon–Dunlop
1927	Belgium	Paul Matton	Armor–Dunlop
1928	Belgium	Jules Vanhevel	individual
1929	Belgium	Armand Van Bruane	La Nordiste
1930	Belgium	Émile Joly	Génial Lucifer
1931	Belgium	Maurice De Waele	M. Dewaele
1932	Belgium	Léon Louyet	Génial Lucifer–Hutchinson
1933	Belgium	Jean Aerts	Alcyon–Dunlop
1934	Belgium	François Gardier	Depas Cycles
1935	Belgium	Joseph Moerenhout	Dilecta–Wolber
1936	Belgium	Emile Decroix	Wolber
1937	Belgium	Adolph Braeckeveldt	Helyett–Splendor–Hutchinson
1938	Belgium	François Neuville	Helyett–Hutchinson
1939	Belgium	Joseph Somers	Helyett–Hutchinson
1940– 1944	No race due to World War II		
1945	Belgium	Norbert Callens	Mercier–Hutchinson
1946	Belgium	Albert Ramon	Cilo
1947	Belgium	Maurice Van Herzele	Groene Leeuw
1948	Belgium	Stan Ockers	Garin–Wolber
1949	Belgium	Ernest Sterckx	L'Avenir
1950	Belgium	Albert Dubuisson	Groene Leeuw
1951	Belgium	Lucien Mathys	Groene Leeuw
1952	Belgium	Henri Van Kerckhove	individual
1953	Belgium	Florent Rondelé	Bertin–D'Alessandro
1954	Belgium	Henri Van Kerckhove	Groene Leeuw–Huret
1955	Belgium	Alex Close	Elvé–Peugeot
1956	Belgium	André Vlayen	Elvé–Peugeot
1957	Belgium	Pino Cerami	Peugeot–BP–Dunlop
1958	Belgium	Noël Foré	Groene Leeuw–Leopold
1959	Belgium	Armand Desmet	Groene Leeuw–Sinalco–SAS
1960	Belgium	Alfons Sweeck	Groene Leeuw–Sinalco–SAS
1961	Belgium	Rik Van Looy	Faema
1962	Belgium	Noël Foré	Flandria–Faema–Clément
1963	Netherlands	Peter Post	Dr. Mann–Labo
1964	Belgium	Benoni Beheyt	Wiel's–Groene Leeuw
1965	France	Jean Stablinski	Ford France–Gitane
1966	Italy	Vittorio Adorni	Salvarani
1967	Italy	Carmine Preziosi	Molteni
1968	Belgium	Wilfried David	Flandria–De Clerck
1969	Belgium	Erik De Vlaeminck	Flandria–De Clerck–Krüger
1970	Belgium	Eddy Merckx	Faemino–Faema
1971	Belgium	Eddy Merckx	Molteni
1972	Belgium	Roger Swerts	Molteni
1973	Denmark	Leif Mortensen	Bic
1974	Belgium	Roger Swerts	IJsboerke–Colner
1975	Belgium	Freddy Maertens	Carpenter–Confortluxe–Flandria
1976	Belgium	Michel Pollentier	Flandria–Velda–West Vlaams Vleesbedrijf
1977	Belgium	Walter Planckaert	Maes Pils–Mini-Flat
1978	Belgium	André Dierickx	IJsboerke–Gios
1979	Belgium	Daniel Willems	IJsboerke–Warncke Eis
1980	Netherlands	Gerrie Knetemann	TI–Raleigh–Creda
1981	Netherlands	Ad Wijnands	TI–Raleigh–Creda
1982– 1983	No race		
1984	Belgium	Eddy Planckaert	Panasonic–Raleigh
1985	Belgium	Ludo Peeters	Kwantum–Decosol–Yoko
1986	Belgium	Nico Emonds	Kwantum–Decosol–Yoko
1987	No race		
1988	Netherlands	Frans Maassen	Superconfex–Yoko–Opel–Colnago
1989	Great Britain	Sean Yates	7-Eleven
1990	Netherlands	Frans Maassen	Buckler–Colnago–Decca
1991– 2001	No race		
2002	Netherlands	Bart Voskamp	BankGiroLoterij–Batavus
2003	Australia	Michael Rogers	Quick-Step–Davitamon
2004	France	Sylvain Chavanel	Brioches La Boulangère
2005	Belgium	Tom Boonen	Quick-Step–Innergetic
2006	Netherlands	Maarten Tjallingii	Skil–Shimano
2007	Russia	Vladimir Gusev	Discovery Channel
2008	Belgium	Stijn Devolder	Quick-Step
2009	Netherlands	Lars Boom	Rabobank
2010	Belgium	Stijn Devolder	Quick-Step
2011	Belgium	Philippe Gilbert	Omega Pharma–Lotto
2012	Germany	Tony Martin	Omega Pharma–Quick-Step
2013	Germany	Tony Martin	Omega Pharma–Quick-Step
2014	Germany	Tony Martin	Omega Pharma–Quick-Step
2015	Belgium	Greg Van Avermaet	BMC Racing Team
2016	Belgium	Dries Devenyns	IAM Cycling
2017	Belgium	Jens Keukeleire	Belgium (national team)
2018	Belgium	Jens Keukeleire	Lotto–Soudal
2019	Belgium	Remco Evenepoel	Deceuninck–Quick-Step
2020	No race due to the COVID-19 pandemic in Belgium		
2021	Belgium	Remco Evenepoel	Deceuninck–Quick-Step
2022	Switzerland	Mauro Schmid	Quick-Step Alpha Vinyl Team
2023	Netherlands	Mathieu van der Poel	Alpecin–Deceuninck
2024	Norway	Søren Wærenskjold	Uno-X Mobility
2025	Italy	Filippo Baroncini	UAE Team Emirates XRG

=== Multiple winners ===
Name	Country	Wins	Years
Tony Martin	Germany	3	2012, 2013, 2014
Louis Mottiat	Belgium	2	1914, 1920
Émile Masson	Belgium	2	1919, 1923
René Vermandel	Belgium	2	1921, 1922
Henri Van Kerckhove	Belgium	2	1952, 1954
Noël Foré	Belgium	2	1958, 1962
Eddy Merckx	Belgium	2	1970, 1971
Roger Swerts	Belgium	2	1972, 1974
Frans Maassen	Netherlands	2	1988, 1990
Stijn Devolder	Belgium	2	2008, 2010
Jens Keukeleire	Belgium	2	2017, 2018
Remco Evenepoel	Belgium	2	2019, 2021

=== By nation ===
Rank	Country	Wins	Most times winner	Most Recent Winner
1	Belgium	69	2 wins: Louis Mottiat; Émile Masson; René Vermandel; Henri Van Kerckhove; Noël Foré; Eddy Merckx; Roger Swerts; Stijn Devolder; Jens Keukeleire; Remco Evenepoel	Remco Evenepoel (2021)
2	Netherlands	9	Frans Maassen (2)	Mathieu van der Poel (2023)
3	France	4	1 win: Lucien Petit-Breton; Paul Duboc; Jean Stablinski; Sylvain Chavanel	Sylvain Chavanel (2004)
4	Germany	3	Tony Martin (3)	Tony Martin (2014)
4	Italy	3	1 win: Carmine Preziosi; Vittorio Adorni; Filippo Baroncini	Filippo Baroncini (2025)
6	Australia	1	Michael Rogers (1)	Michael Rogers (2003)
6	Denmark	1	Leif Mortensen (1)	Leif Mortensen (1973)
6	Great Britain	1	Sean Yates (1)	Sean Yates (1989)
6	Norway	1	Søren Wærenskjold (1)	Søren Wærenskjold (2024)
6	Russia	1	Vladimir Gusev (1)	Vladimir Gusev (2007)
6	Switzerland	1	Mauro Schmid (1)	Mauro Schmid (2022)

== Classifications ==
As of the 2023 edition, the jerseys worn by the leaders of the individual classifications are:

- Purple Jersey – Worn by the leader of the general classification.
- Red Jersey – Worn by the leader of the points classification.
- Yellow Jersey – Worn by the leader of the youth classification.
- White Jersey – Worn by the leader of the combativity classification.
