= 1960 Harelbeke–Antwerp–Harelbeke =

Race details
- Dates: 12 March 1960
- Stages: 1
- Distance: 201 km (125 mi)
- Winning time: 5h 09' 00"

Results
	Winner	Daniel Doom (BEL)
	Second	Odiel Vanderlinden (BEL)
	Third	Petrus Oellibrandt (BEL)

The 1960 Harelbeke–Antwerp–Harelbeke (Note: The race was known as Harelbeke–Antwerp–Harelbeke (French: Harelbeke–Anvers–Harelbeke) for the first twelve editions. In 1970, the race became known as the E3, after the Belgian road which is now known as the E17.) was the third edition of the E3 Harelbeke cycle race and was held on 12 March 1960. The race started and finished in Harelbeke. The race was won by Daniel Doom.

== General classification ==
Final general classification

Rank	Rider	Time
1	Daniel Doom (BEL)	5h 09' 00"
2	Odiel Vanderlinden (BEL)	+ 2"
3	Petrus Oellibrandt (BEL)	+ 3"
4	Arthur Decabooter (BEL)	+ 3"
5	Frans De Mulder (BEL)	+ 3"
6	Julien Schepens (BEL)	+ 3"
7	Rik Luyten (BEL)	+ 3"
8	André Noyelle (BEL)	+ 3"
9	Jef Planckaert (BEL)	+ 3"
10	Georges Decraeye (BEL)	+ 3"
