= Addo Kazianka =

Italian cyclist

Personal information
- Born: 16 February 1936 (age 90) Desio, Italy

Cycling career
- Sport: Cycling
- Role: Rider

Addo Kazianka (born 16 February 1936) is an Italian racing cyclist. He won stage 12 of the 1960 Giro d'Italia.
