= Robert De Middeleir =

Belgian cyclist

Personal information
- Born: 26 August 1938 Oordegem, Belgium
- Died: 8 July 2016 (aged 77)

Cycling career
- Sport: Cycling
- Role: Rider

Professional teams
- 1962–1963: Wiel's – Groene Leeuw
- 1964–1965: Mercier – BP – Hutchinson
- 1966: Libertas
- 1966: Flandria
- 1967: Terrot – Wacquier

Robert De Middeleir (26 August 1938 – 8 July 2016) was a Belgian cyclist. Professional from 1962 to 1967, he notably won the Omloop Het Nieuwsblad in 1962.

== Honours ==
- 1961
  - 2nd in the Nationale Sluitingsprijs
- 1962
  - Omloop Het Nieuwsblad
  - 2nd in the Brabantse Pijl
  - 2nd in the Kuurne–Brussels–Kuurne
- 1964
  - Nokere Koerse
- 1966
  - 2nd in the Kuurne–Brussels–Kuurne
  - 3rd in the Circuit du Houtland - Torhout

== Results in the grands tours ==
=== Tour de France ===
- 1962 : retired (14th stage)
