= Hans Schleuniger =

Swiss cyclist (1933–2021)

Personal information
- Born: 9 July 1933 Klingnau, Switzerland
- Died: 19 December 2021 (aged 88)

Cycling career
- Sport: Cycling
- Role: Rider

Hans Schleuniger (9 July 1933 – 19 December 2021) was a Swiss professional racing cyclist. He rode in the 1960 Tour de France. Schleuniger died on 19 December 2021, at the age of 88.
