= Leif Hammel =

Danish cyclist

Personal information
- Born: 28 February 1935 (age 91) Copenhagen, Denmark

Cycling career
- Sport: Cycling
- Role: Rider

Leif Hammel (born 28 February 1935) is a Danish former professional racing cyclist. He rode in the 1960 Tour de France.
