= Frans De Mulder =

Belgian cyclist

- De Mulder with Groene Leeuw-SAS in 1959

Personal information
- Full name: Frans De Mulder
- Born: 17 December 1937 Kruishoutem, Belgium
- Died: 5 March 2001 (aged 63) Deinze, Belgium

Cycling career
- Sport: Cycling
- Discipline: Road
- Role: Rider

Professional teams
- 1959–61: Groene Leeuw-SAS
- 1961–63: Wiel's-Groene Leeuw

Major wins
- Grand Tours Vuelta a España General classification (1960) 4 individual stages (1960) One-day races and Classics National Road Race Championships (1960) Kampioenschap van Vlaanderen (1961)

Frans De Mulder (17 December 1937 in Kruishoutem – 5 March 2001 in Deinze) was a professional road racing cyclist from Belgium between 1958 and 1963.

De Mulder is most famous for winning the overall title and four stages the 1960 Vuelta a España. He bested fellow countryman Armand Desmet and Spaniard Miguel Pacheco across 3566 km in 17 stages.

A medical examination in 1963 revealed that he had a shortage of red blood cells. After a six-month rest period, De Mulder no longer had the strength to return. At the age of just 26, he disappeared from the peloton.

After his cycling career, luck wasn't on his side. In a serious accident in the port of Antwerp, a heavy cable snapped and landed on him, paralyzing his arm. He died in 2001 from a heart attack at the age of just 63.

His brother Marcel De Mulder was also a professional cyclist.

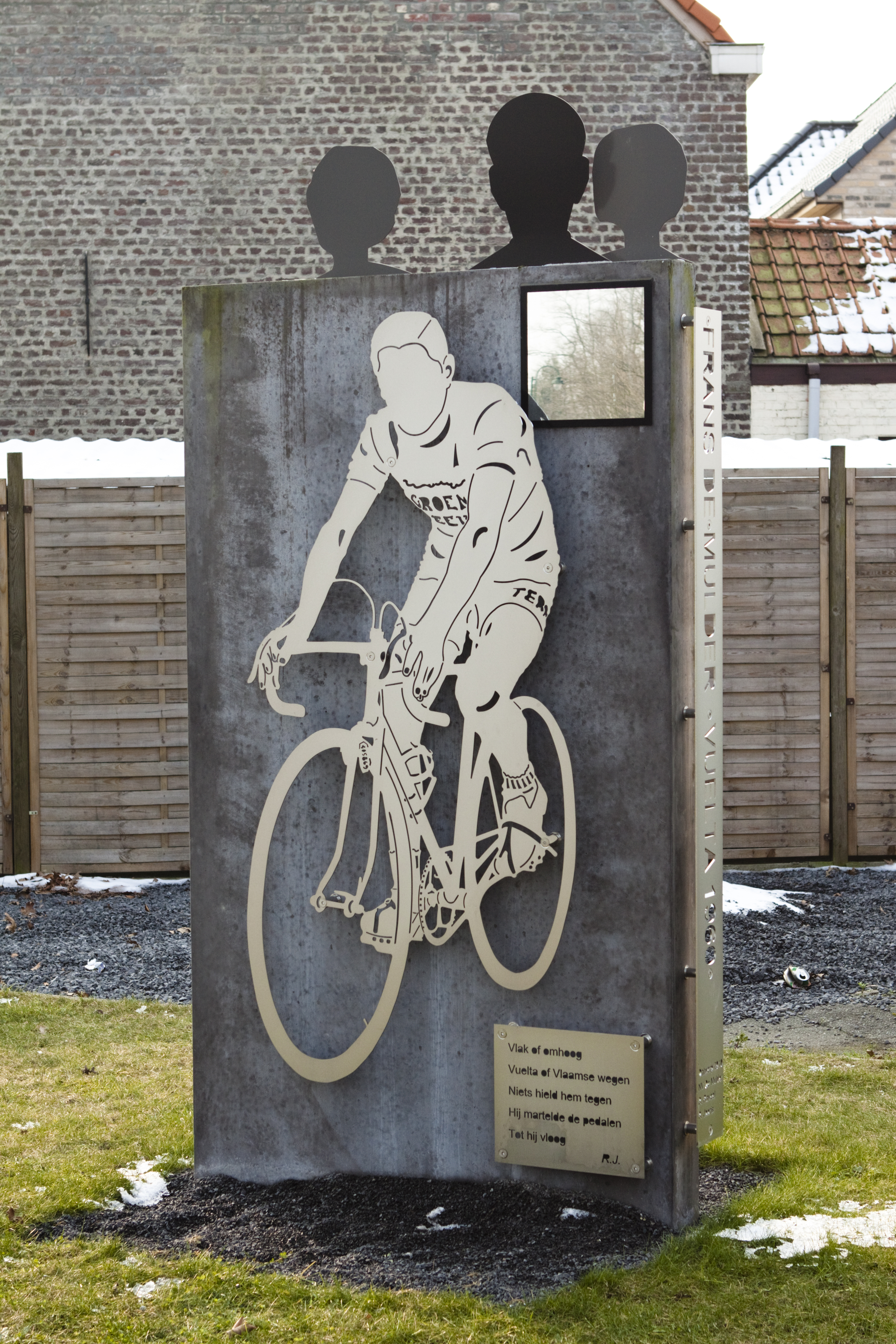
Portrait of Frans De Mulder cycling

== Major results ==
1959
1st Stage 5a Tour de l'Ouest
3rd Liège–Bastogne–Liège
4th Milan–San Remo
4th Brussels–Ingooigem
7th Paris–Roubaix
7th La Flèche Wallonne
1960
1st Road race, National Road Championships
1st Overall Vuelta a España

1st Stages 4, 7, 16 & 17a

2nd Gent–Wevelgem
3rd Omloop van het Houtland
5th Harelbeke–Antwerp–Harelbeke
6th Tour of Flanders
6th Dwars door België
7th Overall Tour de Luxembourg

1st Stage 4

7th Milan–San Remo
7th Kuurne–Brussels–Kuurne
10th Brussels–Ingooigem
1961
1st Kampioenschap van Vlaanderen
8th Kuurne–Brussels–Kuurne
1962
Critérium du Dauphiné Libéré

1st Points classification
1st Stage 7

3rd Overall Tour de Luxembourg
3rd Harelbeke–Antwerp–Harelbeke
4th Road race, National Road Championships
5th Omloop Het Volk
7th Overall Four Days of Dunkirk
9th Kuurne–Brussels–Kuurne
9th De Kustpijl
1963
1st Nokere Koerse
3rd Overall Tour of Belgium

1st Stage 3b (ITT)

5th De Kustpijl
8th GP Stad Zottegem

=== Grand Tour general classification results timeline ===
Grand Tour	1960	1961	1962
Vuelta a España	1	DNF	—
Giro d'Italia	—	—	—
Tour de France	—	—	DNF

Legend
—	Did not compete
DNF	Did not finish
