= 1960 Vuelta a España =

Race details
- Dates: 29 April – 15 May
- Stages: 17
- Distance: 3,567 km (2,216 mi)
- Winning time: 103h 05' 57"

Results
| Jersey awarded to the overall winner | Winner | Frans De Mulder (BEL) | (Groene Leeuw) |
| | Second | Armand Desmet (BEL) | (Groene Leeuw) |
| | Third | Miguel Pacheco Font (ESP) | (Licor 43) |
| Jersey awarded to the points classification winner | Points | Arthur Decabooter (BEL) | (Groene Leeuw) |
| | Mountains | Antonio Karmany (ESP) | (KAS) |
| | Sprints | Vicente Iturat (ESP) | (Ferrys) |

The 15th Vuelta a España (Tour of Spain), a long-distance bicycle stage race and one of the three grand tours, was held from 29 April to 15 May 1960. It consisted of 17 stages covering a total of 3,567 km (2,216 mi), and was won by Frans De Mulder of the Groene Leeuw cycling team. Arthur Decabooter won the points classification and Antonio Karmany won the mountains classification.

== Route ==
List of stages
| Stage | Date | Course | Distance | Type | Winner |
|---|---|---|---|---|---|
| 1 | 29 April | Gijón to Gijón | 8 km (5 mi) | Team time trial | Faema |
| 2 | 30 April | Gijón to A Coruña | 235 km (146 mi) | | Felipe Alberdi (ESP) |
| 3 | 1 May | A Coruña to Vigo | 187 km (116 mi) | | Antonio Barrutia (ESP) |
| 4 | 2 May | Vigo to Ourense | 105 km (65 mi) | | Frans De Mulder (BEL) |
| 5 | 3 May | Ourense to Zamora | 287 km (178 mi) | | Antonio Gómez del Moral (ESP) |
| 6 | 4 May | Zamora to Madrid | 250 km (155 mi) | | Nino Assirelli (ITA) |
| 7 | 5 May | Madrid to Madrid | 209 km (130 mi) | | Frans De Mulder (BEL) |
| 8 | 6 May | Guadalajara to Zaragoza | 264 km (164 mi) | | Arthur Decabooter (BEL) |
| 9 | 7 May | Zaragoza to Barcelona | 269 km (167 mi) | | Salvador Botella (ESP) |
| 10 | 8 May | Barcelona to Barbastro | 240 km (149 mi) | | Alfons Sweeck (BEL) |
| 11 | 9 May | Barbastro to Pamplona | 267 km (166 mi) | | Vicente Iturat (ESP) |
| 12 | 10 May | Pamplona to Logroño | 179 km (111 mi) | | Jesús Galdeano (ESP) |
| 13 | 11 May | Logroño to San Sebastián | 211 km (131 mi) | | Federico Bahamontes (ESP) |
| 14 | 12 May | San Sebastián to Vitoria | 263 km (163 mi) | | Antonio Suárez (ESP) |
| 15 | 13 May | Vitoria to Santander | 232 km (144 mi) | | Arthur Decabooter (BEL) |
| 16 | 14 May | Santander to Bilbao | 192 km (119 mi) | | Frans De Mulder (BEL) |
| 17a | 15 May | Bilbao to Guernica | 116 km (72 mi) | | Frans De Mulder (BEL) |
| 17b | 15 May | Guernica to Bilbao | 53 km (33 mi) | Individual time trial | Antonio Karmany (ESP) |
| | Total | | 3,567 km (2,216 mi) | | |

== Results ==
Final general classification
| Rank | Rider | Team | Time |
|---|---|---|---|
| 1 | (Belgium) Frans De Mulder | Groene Leeuw | 103h 05' 57" |
| 2 | (Belgium) Armand Desmet | Groene Leeuw | + 15' 21" |
| 3 | (Spain) Miguel Pacheco Font | Licor 43 | + 19' 24" |
| 4 | (Spain) Antonio Karmany | Kas | + 22' 03" |
| 5 | (Spain) Juan Campillo | Kas | + 29' 50" |
| 6 | (Spain) Fernando Manzaneque | Faema | + 31' 58" |
| 7 | (Spain) Salvador Botella | Faema | + 32' 58" |
| 8 | (Spain) Benigno Aspuru | Kas | + 35' 08" |
| 9 | (Spain) Jesús Loroño | Majestad | + 38' 11" |
| 10 | (Belgium) Arthur Decabooter | Groene Leeuw | + 44' 42" |
| 11 | (Spain) Antonio Suárez | Faema | |
| 12 | (Belgium) Andre Messelis | Groene Leeuw | |
| 13 | (Spain) Rene Marigil | Ferrys | |
| 14 | (France) Antonin Rolland | Margnat-Rochet | |
| 15 | (Spain) Carmelo Morales | Kas | |
| 16 | (Belgium) Alfons Sweeck | Groene Leeuw | |
| 17 | (Spain) José Gomez Del Moral | Groene Leeuw | |
| 18 | (Spain) Angel Guardiola | | |
| 19 | (France) Joseph Aure | Margnat-Rochet | |
| 20 | (Spain) José Segú Soriano | Kas | |
| 21 | (Spain) Jesús Galdeano | Faema | |
| 22 | (Spain) Manuel Santiago | Licor 43 | |
| 23 | (Spain) Antonio Bertrán | Faema | |
| 24 | (Belgium) Constant De Keyser | Groene Leeuw | |
