= Göran Karlsson (cyclist) =

Swedish cyclist (1937–2020)

Personal information
- Born: 21 September 1937 Norrköping, Sweden
- Died: 23 May 2020 (aged 82)

Cycling career
- Sport: Cycling
- Role: Rider

Göran Karlsson (21 September 1937 – 23 May 2020) was a Swedish professional racing cyclist. He rode in the 1960 Tour de France.
