= ERA–Circus =

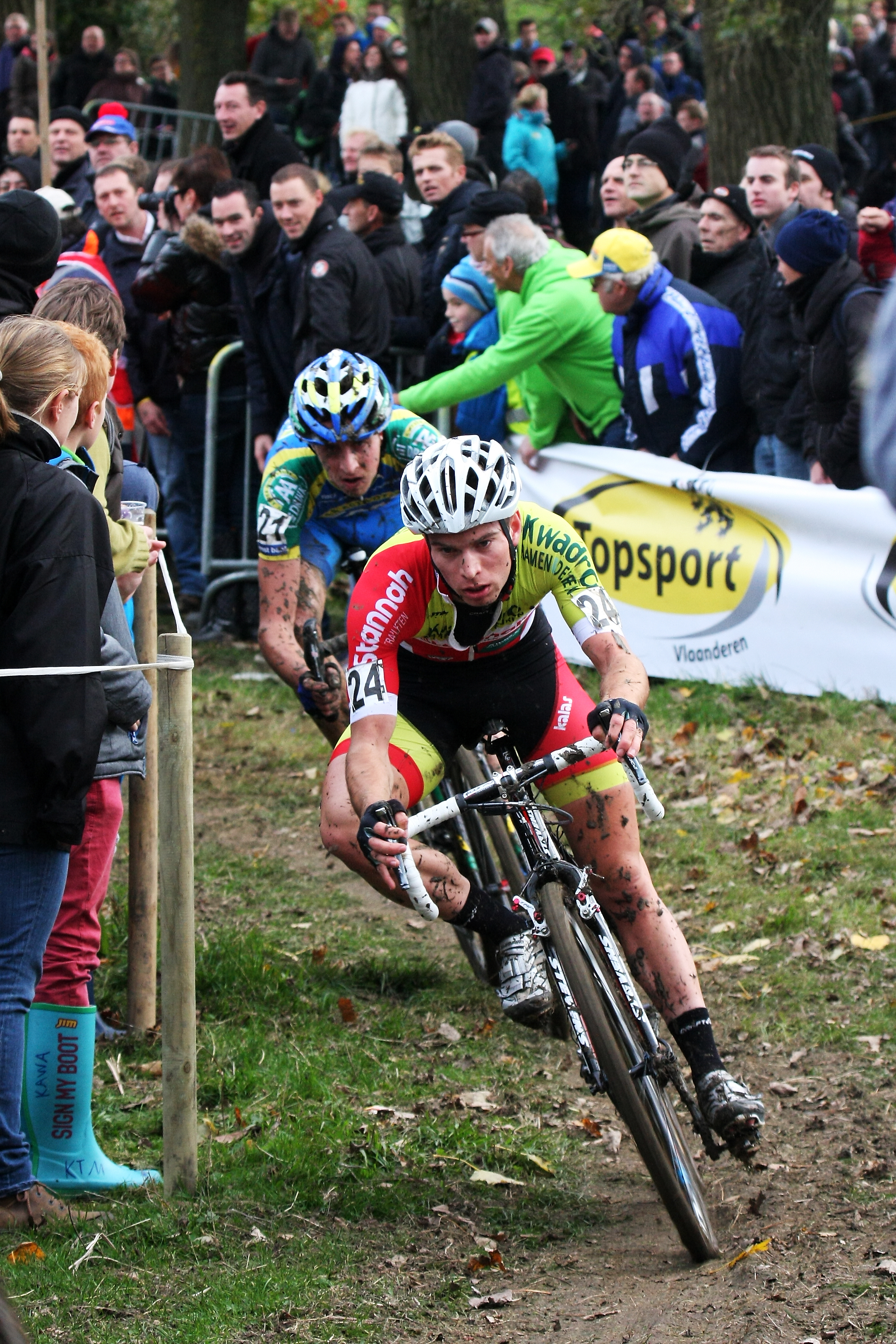

Team information
- UCI code: ERC
- Registered: Belgium
- Founded: 2013
- Discipline: Road
- Status: National (2013); UCI Continental (2014–present)

Team name history
- 2013–2014 2014–2015 2015 2016 2016 2017–: Kwadro–Stannah; Corendon–Kwadro; ERA Real Estate–Murprotec; ERA–Murprotec; ERA Real Estate–Circus; ERA–Circus
ERA–Circus jersey
Jersey

ERA–Circus is a UCI continental team founded in 2013 and based in Belgium. It participates in UCI Continental Circuits races.

In December 2017, Beobank–Corendon announced that Circus, a Belgian betting company had signed three-year sponsorship deal. Circus announced they would continue to sponsor this team until the end of the cyclo-cross season in March.

== Team roster ==
Rider	Date of birth
Wietse Bosmans (BEL)	30 December 1991 (age 34)
Jelle Cant (BEL)	19 June 1992 (age 34)
Timo Kielich (BEL)	5 August 1999 (age 27)
Braam Merlier (BEL)	11 February 1993 (age 33)
Gert Smets (BEL)	26 September 1997 (age 29)

Rider	Date of birth
Laurens Sweeck (BEL)	17 December 1993 (age 32)
Yorben Van Tichelt (BEL)	12 July 1994 (age 32)
Toon Wouters (NED)	21 November 1994 (age 31)

== Major wins ==
Internationale Sluitingsprijs Oostmalle, Diether Sweeck
Superprestige #7 MU - Middelkerke, Diether Sweeck
Superprestige #6 - Hoogstraten, Diether Sweeck
Krawatencross, Diether Sweeck
UCI World Cup #4 - Hoogerheide, Diether Sweeck
Bpost Bank Trofee #7 - G.P. Sven Nys, Diether Sweeck
