= Emil Reinecke =

German cyclist

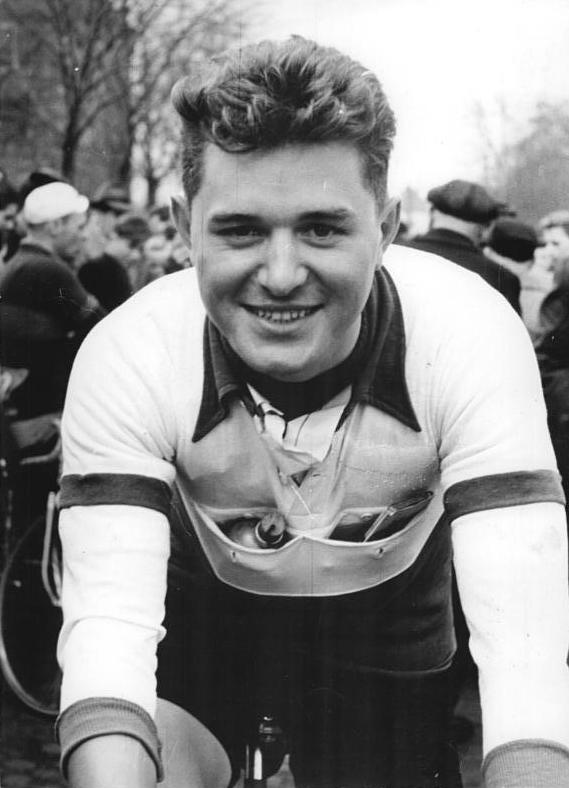

Personal information
- Born: 26 April 1933 Einbeck, Germany
- Died: 4 May 2011 (aged 78) Delmenhorst, Germany

Cycling career
- Sport: Cycling
- Role: Rider

Emil Reinecke (26 April 1933 – 4 May 2011) was a German professional racing cyclist. He rode in the 1960 Tour de France.
