= Pierre Morel (cyclist) =

French cyclist (1930–2011)

Personal information
- Born: 10 September 1930 Saint-Claude, France
- Died: 7 May 2011 (aged 80) Louhans, France

Cycling career
- Sport: Cycling
- Role: Rider

Pierre Marie Joseph Gabriel Morel (10 September 1930 – 7 May 2011) was a French professional racing cyclist. He rode in the 1960 Tour de France. Morel died in Louhans on 7 May 2011, at the age of 80.
