= John Kennedy (cyclist) =

British cyclist

Personal information
- Born: 23 May 1931 Glasgow, Scotland
- Died: 13 July 1989 (aged 58) Bodrum, Turkey

Cycling career
- Sport: Cycling
- Role: Rider

John Kennedy (23 May 1931 – 13 July 1989) was a British professional racing cyclist. He rode in the 1960 Tour de France.
