= Wilfried Thaler =

Austrian cyclist (1934–2020)

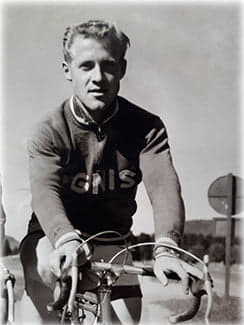

Personal information
- Born: 24 July 1934 (age 92) Vorarlberg, Austria
- Died: 15 February 2020 (aged 85)

Cycling career
- Sport: Cycling
- Role: Rider

Wilfried Thaler (24 July 1934 – 15 February 2020) was an Austrian professional racing cyclist. He rode in the 1960 Tour de France.
