= Harold Reynolds (cyclist) =

British cyclist

Personal information
- Born: 12 October 1935 (age 91) Birmingham, England

Cycling career
- Sport: Cycling

Harold Reynolds (born 12 October 1935) is a former British cyclist. He competed in the individual and team road race events at the 1956 Summer Olympics. He also rode in the 1960 Tour de France.
