= Felipe Alberdi =

Spanish cyclist (1930–2025)

Personal information
- Born: 23 August 1930 Amorebieta-Etxano, Spain
- Died: 25 December 2025 (aged 95)

Cycling career
- Sport: Cycling
- Discipline: Road
- Role: Rider

Professional teams
- 1956: Boxing
- 1957: Indaucha
- 1958: Kas–Boxing
- 1960–1961: Brandy Majestad

Major wins
- Grand Tours Vuelta a España 1 individual stage (1960)

Felipe Alberdi (23 August 1930 – 25 December 2025) was a Spanish road cyclist. He notably won Stage 2 of the 1960 Vuelta a España and wore the leaders jersey the following stage.

Alberdi coame from the Spanish town of Amorebieta-Etxano. He died on 25 December 2025, at the age of 95.

== Major results ==
1956
1st GP Virgen Blanca
2nd Circuito de Getxo
1957
9th Overall Eibarko Bizikleta

1st Stage 3b

9th Overall Vuelta a La Rioja
1960
Vuelta a España

1st Stage 2
Held after Stage 2

2nd Klasika Primavera
8th Overall Eibarko Bizikleta

=== Grand Tour result ===
Grand Tour	1956	1957	1958	1959	1960
Vuelta a España	DNF	–	DNF	–	DNF
Giro d'Italia	–	–	–	–	–
Tour de France	–	–	–	–	–

Legend
—	Did not compete
DNF	Did not finish
