= Alfons Sweeck =

Belgian cyclist (1936–2019)

Personal information
- Born: 15 March 1936 Keerbergen, Belgium
- Died: 13 December 2019 (aged 83) Leuven, Belgium

Cycling career
- Sport: Cycling
- Discipline: Road
- Role: Rider

Professional team
- 1959–1963: Groene Leeuw–Sinalco–SAS

Alfons Sweeck (15 March 1936 – 13 December 2019) was a Belgian professional cyclist from 1959 to 1962.

He was the grandfather of fellow cyclists Laurens, Diether and Hendrik Sweeck.

Sweeck won a stage of the 1960 Vuelta a España and the general classification of the 1960 Tour of Belgium.

== Major results ==
1957
5th Ronde van Vlaanderen Beloften
1958
3rd Overall Milk Race

1st Stages 3 & 5a (ITT)

1959
1st Stage 3b Tour of Belgium
1st Stage 6 Tour de Tunisie
9th Grand Prix des Nations
1960
1st Overall Tour of Belgium
1st Stage 10 Vuelta a España
