= Gilberto Dall'Agata =

Italian cyclist (1930–2017)

Personal information
- Born: 27 June 1930 Cesena, Italy
- Died: 10 March 2017 (aged 86)

Cycling career
- Sport: Cycling
- Role: Rider

Gilberto Dall'Agata (27 June 1930 – 10 March 2017) was an Italian racing cyclist. He rode in the 1958 Tour de France. Dall'Agata died on 10 March 2017, at the age of 86.
