= 1960 Giro d'Italia =

Race details
- Dates: 19 May - 9 June 1960
- Stages: 21, including two split stages
- Distance: 3,481.2 km (2,163 mi)
- Winning time: 94h 03' 54"

Results
Jersey awarded to the overall winner	Winner	Jacques Anquetil (FRA)	(Fynsec–Helyett)
	Second	Gastone Nencini (ITA)	(Carpano)
	Third	Charly Gaul (LUX)	(EMI–Guerra)
	Mountains	Rik Van Looy (BEL)	(Faema)
	Sprints	Rino Benedetti (ITA)	(Ghigi)
	Team	Ignis	

The 1960 Giro d'Italia was the 43rd running of the Giro d'Italia, one of cycling's Grand Tour races. The Giro started in Rome, on 19 May, with a 215 km (133.6 mi) stage and concluded in Milan, on 9 June, with a 225 km (139.8 mi) leg. A total of 140 riders from 14 teams entered the 21-stage race, which was won by Frenchman Jacques Anquetil of the Helyett team. The second and third places were taken by Italian Gastone Nencini and Luxembourgian Charly Gaul, respectively.

== Teams ==
Fourteen teams were invited by the race organizers to participate in the 1960 edition of the Giro d'Italia. Each team sent a squad of ten riders, which meant that the race started with a peloton of 140 cyclists. From the riders that began the race, 97 made it to the finish in Florence.

The teams entering the race were:

- EMI–Guerra
- Atala
- Bianchi
- Carpano
- Faema
- Fynsec–Helyett
- Gazzola–Fiorelli
- Ghigi
- Ignis
- Legnano
- Molteni
- Philco
- San Pellegrino
- Torpado

Most riders were Italian, but there were 42 foreign riders, from Belgium, France, the Netherlands, Spain, Germany, Luxembourg and Switzerland.

Jacques Anquetil was seen as the favourite to win the general classification, with Charly Gaul and Rik Van Looy and as his closest competitors.

== Route and stages ==
The race route was revealed on 13 April 1960. Although it was traditional to start the Giro in Milan, the start of the race was moved to Rome to honor the Summer Olympics to be held in the city later that year. Before the race began in Rome, the organizers honored the race's first organizer Armando Cougnet, five-time Giro champion Fausto Coppi, and journalist Orio Vergani, all of whom died before the race started in 1960. President Giovanni Gronchi officially opened the race.

The Gavia Pass was used as a mountain climb for the first time.

Stage characteristics and winners
Stage	Date	Course	Distance	Type	Winner
1	19 May	Rome to Naples	212 km (132 mi)	Plain stage	Dino Bruni (ITA)
2	20 May	Sorrento to Sorrento	25 km (16 mi)	Individual time trial	Romeo Venturelli (ITA)
3	21 May	Sorrento to Campobasso	186 km (116 mi)	Plain stage	Miguel Poblet (ESP)
4	22 May	Campobasso to Pescara	192 km (119 mi)	Plain stage	Salvador Botella (ESP)
5	23 May	Pescara to Rieti	218 km (135 mi)	Stage with mountain(s)	Gastone Nencini (ITA)
6	24 May	Terni to Rimini	230 km (143 mi)	Stage with mountain(s)	Pierino Baffi (ITA)
7a	25 May	Igea Marina	5 km (3 mi)	Individual time trial	Miguel Poblet (ESP)
7b	25 May	Bellaria to Forlì	81 km (50 mi)	Stage with mountain(s)	Rik Van Looy (BEL)
8	26 May	Forlì to Livorno	206 km (128 mi)	Stage with mountain(s)	Rik Van Looy (BEL)
9a	27 May	Livorno to Carrara	93 km (58 mi)	Plain stage	Emile Daems (BEL)
9b	27 May	Carrara to Cave di Carrara	2.2 km (1 mi)	Individual time trial	Jacques Anquetil (FRA); Miguel Poblet (ESP)
10	28 May	Carrara to Sestri Levante	171 km (106 mi)	Stage with mountain(s)	Gastone Nencini (ITA)
11	29 May	Sestri Levante to Asti	180 km (112 mi)	Stage with mountain(s)	Rik Van Looy (BEL)
12	30 May	Asti to Cervinia	176 km (109 mi)	Stage with mountain(s)	Addo Kazianka (ITA)
13	31 May	Saint-Vincent to Milan	225 km (140 mi)	Stage with mountain(s)	Jean Stablinski (FRA)
	1 June	Rest day			
14	2 June	Seregno to Lecco	68 km (42 mi)	Individual time trial	Jacques Anquetil (FRA)
15	3 June	Lecco to Verona	150 km (93 mi)	Plain stage	André Darrigade (FRA)
16	4 June	Verona to Treviso	110 km (68 mi)	Plain stage	Roberto Falaschi (ITA)
17	5 June	Treviso to Trieste	147 km (91 mi)	Plain stage	Dino Bruni (ITA)
18	6 June	Trieste to Belluno	240 km (149 mi)	Stage with mountain(s)	Seamus Elliott (IRL)
19	7 June	Belluno to Trento	110 km (68 mi)	Plain stage	Emile Daems (BEL)
20	8 June	Trento to Bormio	229 km (142 mi)	Stage with mountain(s)	Charly Gaul (LUX)
21	9 June	Bormio to Milan	225 km (140 mi)	Plain stage	Arigo Padovan (ITA)
	Total		3,481.2 km (2,163 mi)		

== Classification leadership ==
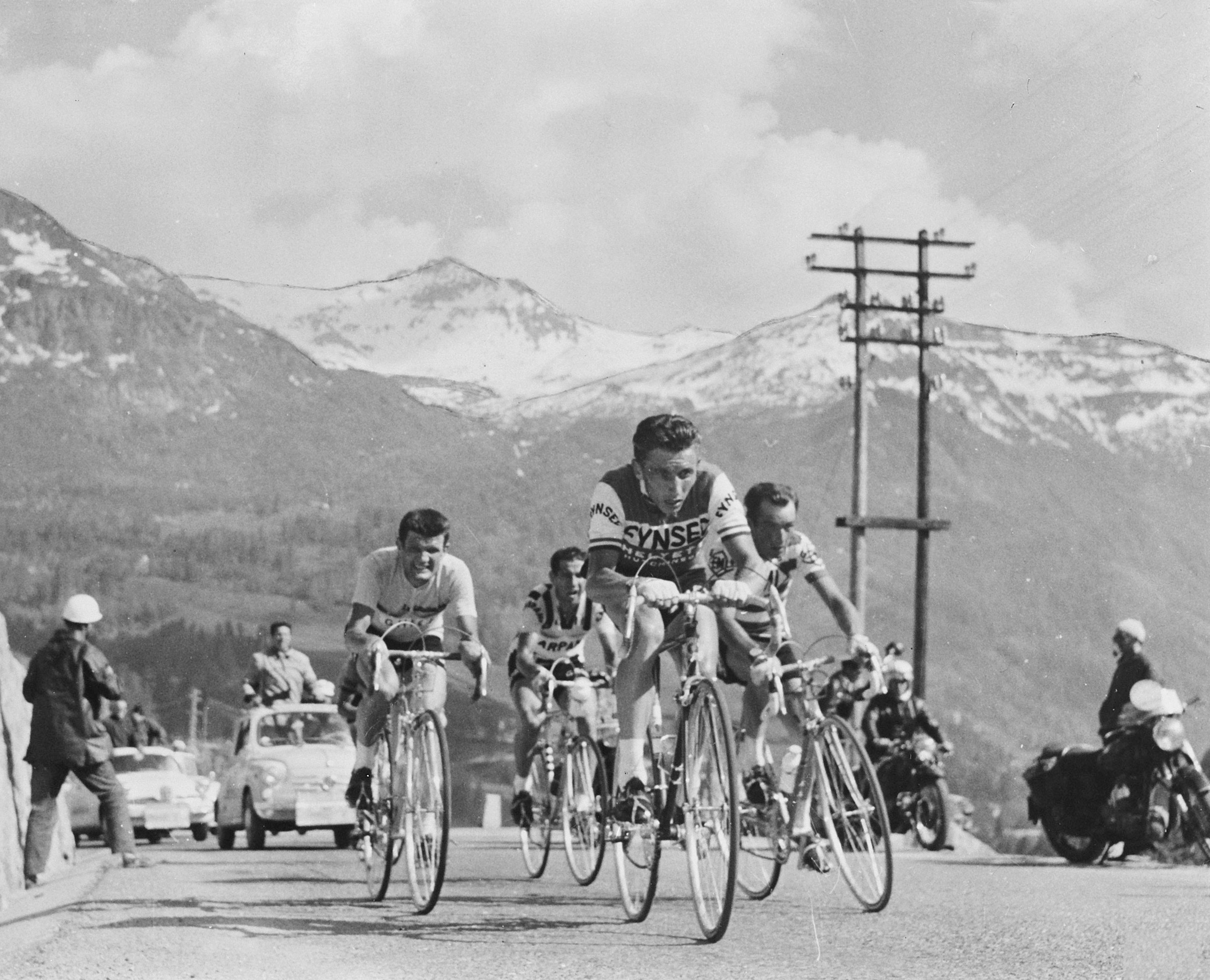
Jacques Anquetil, Charly Gaul, Gastone Nencini, and Jos Hoevenaers riding together during the race.

One jersey was worn during the 1960 Giro d'Italia. The leader of the general classification – calculated by adding the stage finish times of each rider – wore a pink jersey. This classification is the most important of the race, and its winner is considered as the winner of the Giro. There were no time bonuses in 1960.

A major secondary classification was the mountains classification. For this, climbs were ranked in first and second categories. In this ranking, points were won by reaching the summit of a climb ahead of other cyclists. There were three categories of mountains. The first category awarded 80, 60, 40, 30, and 20 points, while the second distributed 60, 40, and 20 points.

There was an intermediate sprints classification. The first three riders at each intermediate sprint received points, 60 for the winner down to 20 for the third.

Although no jersey was awarded, there was also one classification for the teams, in which the teams were awarded points for their rider's performance during the stages. This classification was named the "Ramazzotti" classification, and points were given for high positions in stages, intermediate sprints, mountain tops, and leading the general classification. Bonus points were given to the points scored by a stage winner on mountain passes and intermediate sprints, and for the team that scored the most points.

Classification leadership by stage
Stage	Winner	General classification	Mountains classification	Intermediate sprints classification	Team classification
1	Dino Bruni	Dino Bruni	not awarded	Rino Benedetti	Ignis
2	Romeo Venturelli	Romeo Venturelli	not awarded	Rino Benedetti	Ignis
3	Miguel Poblet	Jacques Anquetil	not awarded	Rino Benedetti	Ignis
4	Salvador Botella	Jacques Anquetil	not awarded	Rino Benedetti	Ignis
5	Gastone Nencini	Jacques Anquetil	Charly Gaul	Rino Benedetti	Ignis
6	Pierino Baffi	Jos Hoevenaers	Charly Gaul	Jos Hoevenaers	Ignis
7a	Miguel Poblet	Jos Hoevenaers	Charly Gaul	Jos Hoevenaers	Ignis
7b	Rik Van Looy	Jos Hoevenaers	Gastone Nencini	Jos Hoevenaers	Ignis
8	Rik Van Looy	Jos Hoevenaers	Gastone Nencini	Rino Benedetti	Ignis
9a	Emile Daems	Jos Hoevenaers	Gastone Nencini	Rino Benedetti	Ignis
9b	Jacques Anquetil & Miguel Poblet	Jos Hoevenaers	Gastone Nencini & Charly Gaul	Rino Benedetti	Ignis
10	Gastone Nencini	Jos Hoevenaers	Michele Gismondi	Rino Benedetti	Ignis
11	Rik Van Looy	Jos Hoevenaers	Michele Gismondi	Rino Benedetti	Ignis
12	Addo Kazianka	Jos Hoevenaers	Michele Gismondi	Rino Benedetti	Ignis
13	Jean Stablinski	Jos Hoevenaers	Michele Gismondi	Rino Benedetti	Ignis
14	Jacques Anquetil	Jacques Anquetil	Michele Gismondi	Rino Benedetti	Ignis
15	André Darrigade	Jacques Anquetil	Michele Gismondi	Rino Benedetti	Ignis
16	Roberto Falaschi	Jacques Anquetil	Michele Gismondi	Rino Benedetti	Ignis
17	Dino Bruni	Jacques Anquetil	Michele Gismondi	Rino Benedetti	Ignis
18	Seamus Elliott	Jacques Anquetil	Michele Gismondi	Rino Benedetti	Ignis
19	Emile Daems	Jacques Anquetil	Michele Gismondi	Rino Benedetti	Ignis
20	Charly Gaul	Jacques Anquetil	Rik Van Looy	Rino Benedetti	Ignis
21	Arigo Padovan	Jacques Anquetil	Rik Van Looy	Rino Benedetti	Ignis
Final		Jacques Anquetil	Rik Van Looy	Rino Benedetti	Ignis

== Final standings ==
Legend
Pink jersey	Denotes the winner of the General classification

=== General classification ===
Final general classification (1–10)
Rank	Name	Team	Time
1	Jacques Anquetil (FRA)	Fynsec–Helyett	94h 03' 54"
2	Gastone Nencini (ITA)	Carpano	+ 28"
3	Charly Gaul (LUX)	EMI–Guerra	+ 3' 51"
4	Imerio Massignan (ITA)	Legnano	+ 4' 06"
5	Jos Hoevenaers (BEL)	Ghigi	+ 5' 53"
6	Guido Carlesi (ITA)	Philco	+ 6' 28"
7	Arnaldo Pambianco (ITA)	Legnano	+ 8' 32"
8	Diego Ronchini (ITA)	Bianchi	+ 9' 28"
9	Edouard Delberghe (FRA)	Fynsec–Helyett	+ 12' 29"
10	Agostino Coletto (ITA)	Ghigi	+ 13' 10"

=== Mountains classification ===
Final mountains classification (1–10)
	Name	Team	Points
1	Rik Van Looy (BEL)	Faema	250
2	Imerio Massignan (ITA)	Legnano	210
3	Gastone Nencini (ITA)	Carpano	190
4	Michele Gismondi (ITA)	Gazzola–Fiorelli	180
5	Charly Gaul (LUX)	EMI–Guerra	160
6	Jean Stablinski (FRA)	Fynsec–Helyett	140
6	Aldo Kazianka (ITA)	EMI–Guerra	140
8	Jacques Anquetil (FRA)	Fynsec–Helyett	130
9	Aurelio Cestari (ITA)	Ignis	120
9	Graziano Battistini (ITA)	Legnano	120

=== Intermediate sprints classification ===
Final intermediate sprints classification (1–9)
	Name	Team	Points
1	Rino Benedetti (ITA)	Ghigi	240
2	Jos Hoevenaers (BEL)	Ghigi	140
3	Miguel Poblet (ESP)	Ignis	120
3	Rik Van Looy (BEL)	Faema	120
5	Giuseppe Sartore (ITA)	Bianchi	100
5	Alessandro Fantini (ITA)	Gazzola–Fiorelli	100
5	Emile Daems (BEL)	Philco	100
5	Dini Liviero (ITA)	Torpado	100
9	Aldo Kazianka (ITA)	EMI–Guerra	80
9	Armando Pellegrini (ITA)	EMI–Guerra	80
9	Pierino Baffi (ITA)	Ignis	80
9	Guido Bodi (ITA)	Ghigi	80

=== Team classification ===
Final team classification (1–10)
	Team	Points
1	Ignis	4336.5
2	Faema	3512.5
3	Fynsec–Helyett	2842.5
4	Ghigi	2735
5	Philco	2128
6	Gazzola–Fiorelli	2125
7	Legnano	1829
8	Carpano	1772.5
9	San Pellegrino	1595
10	EMI–Guerra	1405
