= Juan Campillo =

Spanish cyclist

Juan Campillo García
Personal information
- Born: 16 August 1930 Mazarrón, Spain
- Died: 28 February 1964 (aged 33) Andorra la Vella, Spain

Cycling career
- Sport: Cycling
- Discipline: Road
- Role: Rider

Professional teams
- 1953–1955: Individual
- 1956–1957: R.C.D. Espanol–Mobylette
- 1958: Ignis–Doniselli
- 1959: Faema–Guerra
- 1960–1961: Kas–Boxing
- 1962–1963: Coupry–Margnat

Juan Campillo García (16 August 1930 – 28 February 1964) was a professional road bicycle racer between 1953 and 1963.

== Career ==
Campillo competed in five Vuelta a Españas and four Tour de Frances, with his best result being fifth overall in the 1960 Vuelta a España.

== Retirement and death ==
Campillo retired from racing at the end of the 1963 season and used his savings to buy a restaurant in Andorra. On 28 February 1964, the day before its opening, he was crushed by a truck and died aged 33, leaving his six-year-old son an orphan after his mother died giving birth to him.

== Career achievements ==
=== Major results ===
1956
3rd Trofeo Masferrer
1957
6th Trofeo Jaumendreu
1959
1st Trofeo Jaumendreu
1st Stage 1a (TTT), Volta a la Comunitat Valenciana
2nd Spanish National Hill Climb Championship
1960
2nd Vuelta a La Rioja
Vuelta a España

3rd Points classification
5th General classification

5th Trofeo Masferrer
1961
3rd Circuito de Getxo
1962
3rd Grand Prix d'Issoire
5th Tour de Suisse
9th Mountains classification
10th Critérium du Dauphiné Libéré

=== Grand Tour general classification results timeline ===
Grand Tour	1956	1957	1958	1959	1960	1961	1962	1963
Vuelta a España	DNF	25	13	13	5	15	—	—
Giro d'Italia	—	—	—	—	—	—	—	—
Tour de France	—	—	—	58	—	55	27	46

Legend
—	Did not compete
DNF	Did not finish
