= Groene Leeuw (cycling team) =

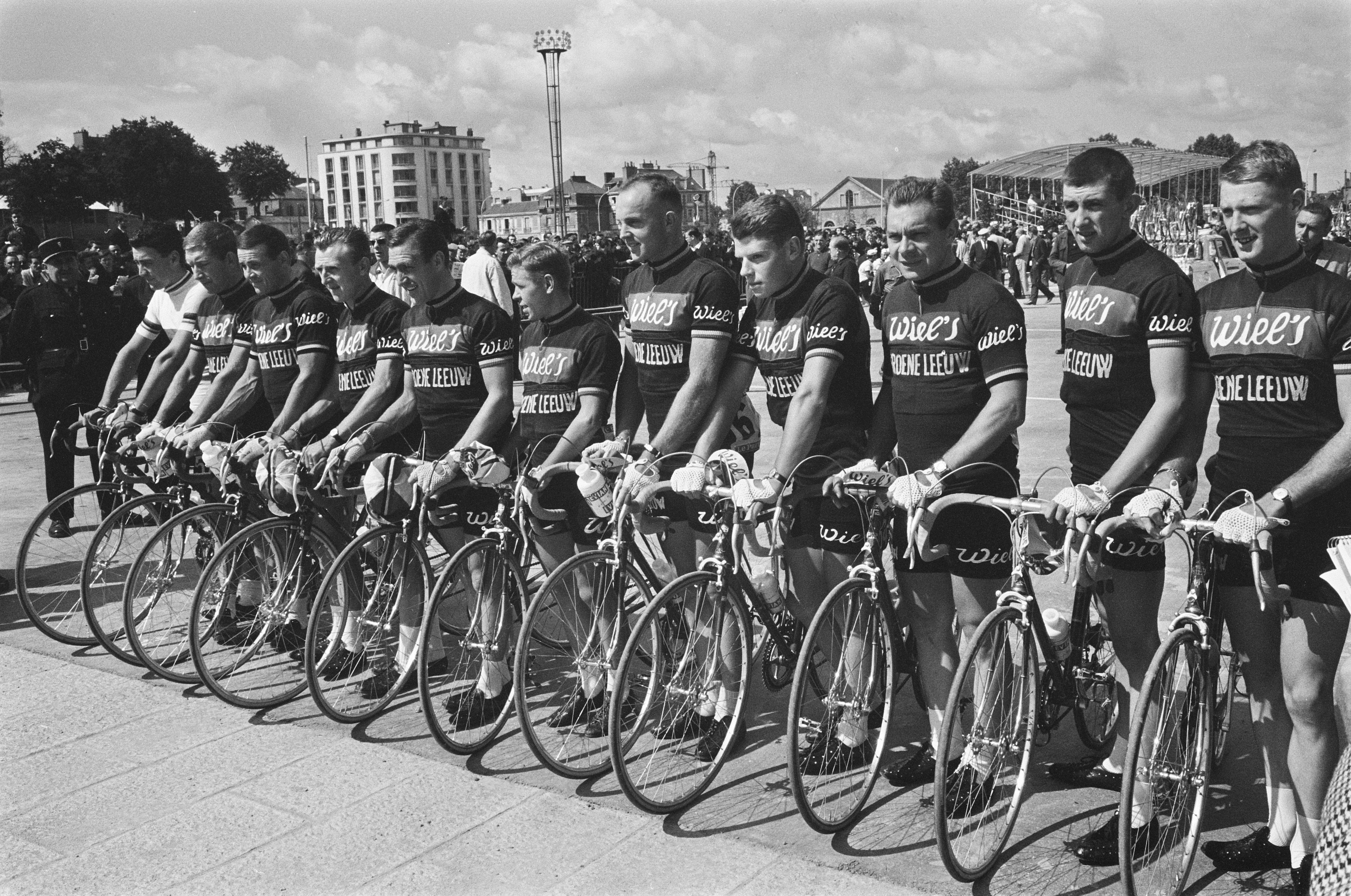
- The Wiel's–Groene Leeuw squad of the 1964 Tour de France

Team information
- Registered: Belgium
- Founded: 1945
- Disbanded: 1969
- Discipline: Road
- Bicycles: Groene Leeuw (1945–1967); Novy (1968–1969)

Key personnel
- General manager: Arthur Decabooter (1968–1969)

Team name history
- 1945–1953 1954 1955–1957 1958 1959–1960 1961 1962–1965 1966 1967 1967 1968–1969: Groene Leeuw; Groene Leeuw–Huret; Groene Leeuw; Groene Leeuw–Leopold; Groene Leeuw–Sinalco–SAS; Groene Leeuw–SAS–Sinalco; Wiel's–Groene Leeuw; Wiel's–Gancia-Groene Leeuw; Groene Leeuw–Tibetan–Pull Over Centrale; Tibetan–Pull Over Centrale; Pull Over Centrale–Novy
Groene Leeuw jersey
Jersey

Groene Leeuw (English: Green Lion) was a Belgian professional cycling team that existed from 1945 to 1969. Its main sponsor was Belgian bicycle manufacturer Groene Leeuw. Among the various co-sponsors was the Belgian beer Wiel's. In the 1960 Vuelta a España, the team finished with the top two placings in the general classification of the 1960 Vuelta a España, with Frans De Mulder first and Armand Desmet second.
