= Manuel Aizpuru =

Spanish cyclist

Cycling career
- Sport: Cycling
- Role: Rider

Manuel Aizpuru was a Spanish racing cyclist. He rode in the 1957 Tour de France.
