= Nino Assirelli =

Italian cyclist

Personal information
- Born: 23 July 1925
- Died: 30 June 2018 (aged 92)

Cycling career
- Sport: Cycling
- Role: Rider

Nino Assirelli (23 July 1925 – 30 June 2018) was an Italian racing cyclist. He won stage 15 of the 1953 Giro d'Italia.
