= Carlo Guarguaglini =

Italian cyclist

Personal information
- Born: 2 January 1933
- Died: 7 May 2010 (aged 77)

Cycling career
- Sport: Cycling
- Role: Rider

Carlo Guarguaglini (2 January 1933 – 7 May 2010) was an Italian racing cyclist. He rode in the 1962 Tour de France, the Giro, the Tour of Lombardy, and many other events during his time as a pro in the ’50s.

After his cycling career, he started his hotel below the small village of Castagneto Carducci, 100k south of Pisa, on the Tuscan coast. Carlo married a local, Isa, and they had two sons together: Fausto and Giancarlo, who still live in the village. Carlo died in 2010, after being ill for a couple of years.
