= Gabriel Mas =

Spanish cyclist

Personal information
- Born: 9 March 1933 (age 93) Montuïri, Spain

Cycling career
- Sport: Cycling
- Role: Rider

Gabriel Mas (born 9 March 1933) is a Spanish former racing cyclist. In 1960 he won the Vuelta a Andalucía.
