= EMI (cycling team) =

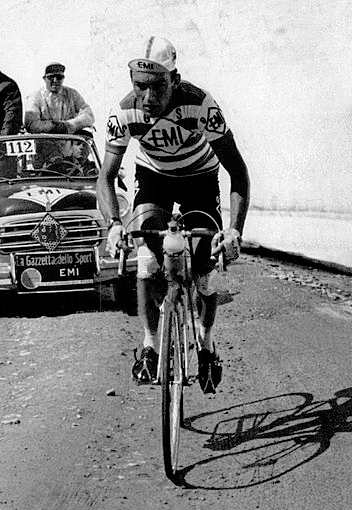
- Charly Gaul at the 1959 Giro d'Italia

Team information
- Registered: Italy
- Founded: 1959
- Disbanded: 1961
- Discipline: Road
- Bicycles: Guerra

Team name history
- 1959 1960 1961: EMI–Guerra; EMI; VOV

EMI was an Italian professional cycling team that existed from 1959 to 1961. In 1961, the team was renamed to VOV, and the Faema team changed its name to EMI for the 1961 Giro d'Italia. Charly Gaul won the general classification of the 1959 Giro d'Italia with the team.
