= Antonio Karmany =

Spanish cyclist

Personal information
- Full name: Antonio Karmany Mestres
- Born: 21 January 1934 Sant Joan, Spain
- Died: 2017 (aged 82–83)

Cycling career
- Sport: Cycling
- Discipline: Road
- Role: Cyclist

Professional teams
- 1957: CIL-Indauchu
- 1958: Lube
- 1959: KAS
- 1960: KAS-Boxing
- 1960: Faema
- 1961: KAS-Royal-Asport
- 1962: KAS
- 1963–1964: Ferrys
- 1965: Tedi Montjuich
- 1966: Andrés Oliver

Major wins
- Vuelta a España King of the Mountains (1960, 1961, 1962); 3 stages Volta a Catalunya (1962)

Antonio Karmany Mestres (21 January 1934 – 2017) was a Spanish professional road racing cyclist.

== Major results ==
1957
1st, Stage 6, Vuelta a Levante
1958
1st, Gran Premio de Primavera
1959
1st, Stages 4a & 6, Volta a Catalunya
1st, Stage 2, Vuelta a España
1960
1st, Subida al Naranco
1st, Stage 7, Volta a Catalunya
4th, Overall, Vuelta a España

1st, Mountains classification
1st, Stage 17b

1961
1st, Subida a Urkiola
1st, Stage 3, Volta a Catalunya
1st, Stage 1a(TTT), Vuelta a Levante
8th, Overall, Vuelta a España

1st, Mountains classification
1st, Stage 15

1962
1st, Overall, Volta a Catalunya
1st, Mountains classification, Vuelta a España
1963
1st, Subida al Naranco
1st, Stage 4, Volta a Catalunya
1st, Stage 3a, Tour of the Basque Country
1965
1st, Stage 2, Vuelta a Andalucía
