= List of teams and cyclists in the 1961 Vuelta a España =

For the 1961 Vuelta a España, the field consisted of 100 riders; 50 finished the race.

== By rider ==
Legend
No.	Starting number worn by the rider during the Vuelta
Pos.	Position in the general classification
Time	Deficit to the winner of the general classification
DNF	Denotes a rider who did not finish

No.	Name	Nationality	Team	Pos.	Time	Ref
1	Frans De Mulder	Belgium	Groene Leeuw	DNF	—	
2	Jan Adriaensens	Belgium	Groene Leeuw	17	+ 24' 43"	
3	Constant De Keyser	Belgium	Groene Leeuw	31	+ 1h 14' 40"	
4	Lucien Mathys	Belgium	Groene Leeuw	DNF	—	
5	Jef Lahaye	Netherlands	Groene Leeuw	23	+ 40' 20"	
6	Arthur Decabooter	Belgium	Groene Leeuw	DNF	—	
7	Alfons Sweeck	Belgium	Groene Leeuw	DNF	—	
8	André Messelis	Belgium	Groene Leeuw	11	+ 8' 29"	
9	Marcel Seynaeve	Belgium	Groene Leeuw	19	+ 26' 49"	
10	René Van Meenen	Belgium	Groene Leeuw	DNF	—	
11	François Mahé	France	France	2	+ 51"	
12	Jean Dotto	France	France	DNF	—	
13	Marcel Rohrbach	France	France	DNF	—	
14	André Le Dissez	France	France	DNF	—	
15	Claude Sauvage	France	France	40	+ 1h 43' 08"	
16	Gérard Thiélin	France	France	DNF	—	
17	Louis Bisilliat	France	France	DNF	—	
18	Raymond Hoorelbeke	France	France	33	+ 1h 32' 56"	
19	Francis Pipelin	France	France	38	+ 1h 36' 34"	
20	Guy Ignolin	France	France	DNF	—	
21	Alves Barbosa	Portugal	Portugal	18	+ 25' 58"	
22	José Carlos Sousa Cardoso	Portugal	Portugal	24	+ 43' 52"	
23	Carlos Carvalho	Portugal	Portugal	44	+ 1h 54' 38"	
24	Henrique Castro	Portugal	Portugal	49	+ 3h 03' 05"	
25	Antonio Baptista	Portugal	Portugal	DNF	—	
26	Martins Almeida	Portugal	Portugal	DNF	—	
27	José Pacheco	Portugal	Portugal	DNF	—	
28	Jorge Corvo	Portugal	Portugal	DNF	—	
29	Sergio Pascoa	Portugal	Portugal	48	+ 2h 33' 02"	
30	Antonio Pisco	Portugal	Portugal	DNF	—	
31	Piet Damen	Netherlands	Netherlands	DNF	—	
32	Albert Edmond	Netherlands	Netherlands	DNF	—	
33	Piet Van De Brekel	Netherlands	Netherlands	DNF	—	
34	Jan Hugens	Netherlands	Netherlands	DNF	—	
35	Dick Enthoven	Netherlands	Netherlands	DNF	—	
36	Huub Zilverberg	Netherlands	Netherlands	DNF	—	
37	Mik Snijder	Netherlands	Netherlands	DNF	—	
38	René Lotz	Netherlands	Netherlands	DNF	—	
39	Ab Sluis	Netherlands	Netherlands	DNF	—	
40	Lambertus van de Ven	Netherlands	Netherlands	DNF	—	
41	Arturo Sabbadin	Italy	Philco-Magni-Torpado	13	+ 12' 46"	
42	Georges Mortiers	Belgium	Philco-Magni-Torpado	DNF	—	
43	Roberto Falaschi	Italy	Philco-Magni-Torpado	DNF	—	
44	Guillaume Michiels	Belgium	Philco-Magni-Torpado	DNF	—	
45	Antonio Accorsi	Italy	Philco-Magni-Torpado	29	+ 1h 04' 01"	
46	Renato Giusti	Italy	Philco-Magni-Torpado	DNF	—	
47	Giovanni Sensi	Italy	Philco-Magni-Torpado	DNF	—	
48	Giovanni Veruchi	Italy	Philco-Magni-Torpado	DNF	—	
49	Marino Franceschetto	Italy	Philco-Magni-Torpado	DNF	—	
50	Tristano Tinarelli	Italy	Philco-Magni-Torpado	DNF	—	
51	Miguel Pacheco	Spain	Licor 43	12	+ 10' 03"	
52	Fernando Manzaneque	Spain	Licor 43	7	+ 5' 47"	
53	Carmelo Morales Erostarbe	Spain	Licor 43	9	+ 7' 38"	
54	Luis Otaño	Spain	Licor 43	21	+ 32' 39"	
55	Miguel Chacón	Spain	Licor 43	DNF	—	
56	René Marigil	Spain	Licor 43	16	+ 20' 30"	
57	Ángel Guardiola Ortiz	Spain	Licor 43	20	+ 30' 01"	
58	Antonio Carreras	Spain	Licor 43	DNF	—	
59	Emilio Hernan Diaz	Spain	Licor 43	27	+ 56' 32"	
60	Esteban Martín Jiménez	Spain	Licor 43	46	+ 2h 12' 38"	
61	Antonio Karmany	Spain	Kas–Royal Asport	8	+ 6' 07"	
62	José Segú	Spain	Kas–Royal Asport	DNF	—	
63	Benigno Aspuru	Spain	Kas–Royal Asport	50	+ 3h 18' 31"	
64	Marcel Queheille	France	Kas–Royal Asport	26	+ 50' 44"	
65	Manuel Martín Piñera	Spain	Kas–Royal Asport	45	+ 1h 59' 24"	
66	Francisco Gabica	Spain	Kas–Royal Asport	30	+ 1h 04:20"	
67	Juan Campillo García	Spain	Kas–Royal Asport	15	+ 16' 48"	
68	Eusebio Vélez	Spain	Kas–Royal Asport	DNF	—	
69	Rogelio Hernández Santibáñez	Spain	Kas–Royal Asport	32	+ 1h 19' 50"	
70	Antonio Jiménez Quiles	Spain	Kas–Royal Asport	22	+ 36' 02"	
71	José Pérez Francés	Spain	Ferrys	3	+ 2' 23"	
72	Julio San Emeterio	Spain	Ferrys	DNF	—	
73	Antonio Bertrán	Spain	Ferrys	DNF	—	
74	Juan Escola	Spain	Ferrys	DNF	—	
75	Emilio Cruz Díaz	Spain	Ferrys	DNF	—	
76	Alberto Sant	Spain	Ferrys	DNF	—	
77	Vicente Aznar	Spain	Ferrys	DNF	—	
78	Juan Antonio Belmonte Prados	Spain	Ferrys	DNF	—	
79	Manuel Perez Perez	Spain	Ferrys	DNF	—	
80	Jesús Loroño	Spain	Ferrys	10	+ 7' 47"	
81	Jesús Galdeano	Spain	Faema	25	+ 47' 20"	
82	Antonio Gómez del Moral	Spain	Faema	5	+ 3' 13"	
83	José Gómez del Moral	Spain	Faema	DNF	—	
84	José Herrero Berrendero	Spain	Faema	47	+ 2h 24' 44"	
85	Gabriel Mas	Spain	Faema	35	+ 1h 29' 17"	
86	Francisco Moreno Martínez	Spain	Faema	37	+ 1h 35' 45"	
87	Salvador Rosa Gómez	Spain	Faema	42	+ 1h 48' 31"	
88	Angelino Soler	Spain	Faema	1	77h 36' 17"	
89	Antonio Suárez	Spain	Faema	4	+ 2' 47"	
90	Salvador Botella	Spain	Faema	14	+ 13' 57"	
91	Vicente Iturat	Spain	Catigene	6	+ 5:29"	
92	Gabriel Company	Spain	Catigene	28	+ 56' 41"	
93	Aniceto Utset	Spain	Catigene	41	+ 1h 45' 14"	
94	José Luis Talamillo	Spain	Catigene	DNF	—	
95	Antonio Barrutia	Spain	Catigene	DNF	—	
96	José Martín Colmenarejo	Spain	Catigene	39	+ 1h 38' 18"	
97	Adolfo Bello	Spain	Catigene	DNF	—	
98	Julio Jiménez	Spain	Catigene	36	+ 1h 29' 25"	
99	José Manuel Quesada Nortes	Spain	Catigene	34	+ 1h 25' 41"	
100	Ángel Rodríguez López	Spain	Catigene	43	+ 1h 51' 00"	
