= 1961 Vuelta a España, Stage 1a to Stage 8 =

Cycling race stages

The 1961 Vuelta a España was the 16th edition of the Vuelta a España, one of cycling's Grand Tours. The Vuelta began in San Sebastián, with a team time trial on 26 April, and Stage 8 occurred on 3 May with a stage to Albacete. The race finished in Bilbao on 11 May.

== Stage 1a ==
26 April 1961 - San Sebastián to San Sebastián, 10.5 km (6.5 mi) (TTT)

Route:

Stage 1a result

Rank	Team	Time
1	Faema	58' 55"
2	Kas–Royal Asport	+ 15"
3	France	+ 32"
4	Licor 43	+ 33"
5	Ferrys	+ 38"
6	Portugal	+ 1' 21"
7	Catigene	s.t.
8	Belgium	+ 1' 58"
9	Netherlands	+ 2' 41"
10	Italy	+ 3' 09"

== Stage 1b ==
26 April 1961 - San Sebastián to Pamplona, 91 km (56.5 mi)

Route:

Stage 1b result

Rank	Rider	Team	Time
1	Marcel Rohrbach (FRA)	France	2h 11' 31"
2	André Le Dissez (FRA)	France	+ 4"
3	Marcel Queheille (FRA)	Kas–Royal Asport	+ 5"
4	José Pérez Francés (ESP)	Ferrys	+ 32"
5	François Mahé (FRA)	France	s.t.
6	Antonio Pisco (POR)	Portugal	s.t.
7	Fernando Manzaneque (ESP)	Licor 43	s.t.
8	Eusebio Vélez (ESP)	Kas–Royal Asport	s.t.
9	Alves Barbosa (POR)	Portugal	+ 49"
10	Guy Ignolin (FRA)	France	+ 50"

General classification after Stage 1b

Rank	Rider	Team	Time
1	Eusebio Vélez (ESP)	Kas–Royal Asport	2h 30' 37"
2	Marcel Queheille (FRA)	Kas–Royal Asport	+ 30"
3	Marcel Rohrbach (FRA)	France	+ 1' 06"
4	André Le Dissez (FRA)	France	+ 1' 10"
5	François Mahé (FRA)	France	+ 1' 15"
6	José Pérez Francés (ESP)	Ferrys	+ 1' 17"
7	Antonio Karmany (ESP)	Kas–Royal Asport	+ 1' 19"
8	Fernando Manzaneque (ESP)	Licor 43	+ 1' 22"
9	Antonio Gómez del Moral (ESP)	Faema	s.t.
10	Angelino Soler (ESP)	Faema	s.t.

== Stage 2 ==
27 April 1961 - Pamplona to Pamplona, 174 km (108.1 mi)

Stage 2 result

Rank	Rider	Team	Time
1	François Mahé (FRA)	France	5h 07' 15"
2	Fernando Manzaneque (ESP)	Licor 43	+ 28"
3	Frans De Mulder (BEL)	Groene Leeuw–SAS–Sinalco	+ 1' 04"
4	Antonio Karmany (ESP)	Kas–Royal Asport	+ 1' 06"
5	Antonio Suárez (ESP)	Faema	s.t.
6	José Pérez Francés (ESP)	Ferrys	s.t.
7	André Messelis (BEL)	Groene Leeuw–SAS–Sinalco	s.t.
8	José Luis Talamillo (ESP)	Catigene	s.t.
9	Carmelo Morales Erostarbe (ESP)	Licor 43	s.t.
10	Lucien Mathys (BEL)	Groene Leeuw–SAS–Sinalco	s.t.

General classification after Stage 2

Rank	Rider	Team	Time
1	Eusebio Vélez (ESP)	Kas–Royal Asport	7h 38' 58"
2	François Mahé (FRA)	France	+ 9"
3	Fernando Manzaneque (ESP)	Licor 43	+ 51"
4	Marcel Rohrbach (FRA)	France	+ 1' 06"
5	José Pérez Francés (ESP)	Ferrys	+ 1' 17"
6	Antonio Karmany (ESP)	Kas–Royal Asport	+ 1' 19"
7	Antonio Gómez del Moral (ESP)	Faema	+ 1' 22"
8	Antonio Suárez (ESP)	Faema	+ 1' 23"
9	René Marigil (ESP)	Licor 43	+ 1' 32"
10	Gabriel Mas (ESP)	Faema	+ 1' 37"

== Stage 3 ==
28 April 1961 - Pamplona to Huesca, 174 km (108 mi)

Route:

Stage 3 result

Rank	Rider	Team	Time
1	Vicente Iturat (ESP)	Catigene	5h 30' 56"
2	Julio San Emeterio (ESP)	Ferrys	+ 1' 25"
3	Luis Otaño (ESP)	Licor 43	+ 1' 55"
4	Antonio Gómez del Moral (ESP)	Faema	s.t.
5	François Mahé (FRA)	France	s.t.
6	Carmelo Morales Erostarbe (ESP)	Licor 43	s.t.
7	André Messelis (BEL)	Groene Leeuw–SAS–Sinalco	s.t.
8	José Pérez Francés (ESP)	Ferrys	s.t.
9	José Carlos Sousa Cardoso (POR)	Portugal	s.t.
10	Marcel Rohrbach (FRA)	France	s.t.

General classification after Stage 3

Rank	Rider	Team	Time
1	François Mahé (FRA)	France	13h 11' 58"
2	Eusebio Vélez (ESP)	Kas–Royal Asport	+ 35"
3	Marcel Rohrbach (FRA)	France	+ 57"
4	José Pérez Francés (ESP)	Ferrys	+ 1' 08"
5	Antonio Gómez del Moral (ESP)	Faema	+ 1' 43"
6	Antonio Karmany (ESP)	Kas–Royal Asport	+ 2' 03"
7	André Messelis (BEL)	Groene Leeuw–SAS–Sinalco	+ 2' 10"
8	Carmelo Morales Erostarbe (ESP)	Licor 43	+ 2' 12"
9	Fernando Manzaneque (ESP)	Licor 43	+ 2' 19"
10	Vicente Iturat (ESP)	Catigene	+ 2' 20"

== Stage 4 ==
29 April 1961 - Binéfar to Barcelona, 199 km (124 mi)

Route:

Stage 4 result

Rank	Rider	Team	Time
1	Marcel Seynaeve (BEL)	Groene Leeuw–SAS–Sinalco	4h 48' 06"
2	José Luis Talamillo (ESP)	Catigene	+ 30"
3	Arthur Decabooter (BEL)	Groene Leeuw–SAS–Sinalco	+ 6' 12"
4	Lambertus van de Ven (NED)	Netherlands	+ 6' 12"
5	Frans De Mulder (BEL)	Groene Leeuw–SAS–Sinalco	+ 6' 17"
6	Marcel Rohrbach (FRA)	France	+ 6' 18"
7	Dick Enthoven (NED)	Netherlands	s.t.
8	André Messelis (BEL)	Groene Leeuw–SAS–Sinalco	s.t.
9	Jef Lahaye (NED)	Groene Leeuw–SAS–Sinalco	s.t.
10	Vicente Iturat (ESP)	Catigene	s.t.

General classification after Stage 4

Rank	Rider	Team	Time
1	José Luis Talamillo (ESP)	Catigene	18h 04' 28"
2	Marcel Seynaeve (BEL)	Groene Leeuw–SAS–Sinalco	+ 42"
3	François Mahé (FRA)	France	+ 1' 54"
4	Eusebio Vélez (ESP)	Kas–Royal Asport	+ 2' 29"
5	Marcel Rohrbach (FRA)	France	+ 2' 51"
6	José Pérez Francés (ESP)	Ferrys	+ 3' 02"
7	Antonio Gómez del Moral (ESP)	Faema	+ 3' 07"
8	Antonio Karmany (ESP)	Kas–Royal Asport	+ 3' 57"
9	André Messelis (BEL)	Groene Leeuw–SAS–Sinalco	+ 4' 04"
10	Carmelo Morales Erostarbe (ESP)	Licor 43	+ 4' 06"

== Stage 5 ==
30 April 1961 - Barcelona to Tortosa, 185 km (115 mi)

Route:

Stage 5 result

Rank	Rider	Team	Time
1	Jesús Galdeano (ESP)	Faema	5h 00' 19"
2	René Van Meenen (BEL)	Groene Leeuw–SAS–Sinalco	+ 30"
3	Guy Ignolin (FRA)	France	+ 1' 09"
4	Constant De Keyser (BEL)	Groene Leeuw–SAS–Sinalco	s.t.
5	Huub Zilverberg (NED)	Netherlands	s.t.
6	Manuel Martín Piñera (ESP)	Kas–Royal Asport	s.t.
7	Frans De Mulder (BEL)	Groene Leeuw–SAS–Sinalco	+ 5' 08"
8	Vicente Iturat (ESP)	Catigene	s.t.
9	Arthur Decabooter (BEL)	Groene Leeuw–SAS–Sinalco	s.t.
10	Salvador Botella (ESP)	Faema	s.t.

General classification after Stage 5

Rank	Rider	Team	Time
1	José Luis Talamillo (ESP)	Catigene	23h 09' 55"
2	Marcel Seynaeve (BEL)	Groene Leeuw–SAS–Sinalco	+ 42"
3	François Mahé (FRA)	France	+ 1' 54"
4	Eusebio Vélez (ESP)	Kas–Royal Asport	+ 2' 29"
5	Guy Ignolin (FRA)	France	+ 2' 35"
6	Marcel Rohrbach (FRA)	France	+ 2' 52"
7	Antonio Gómez del Moral (ESP)	Faema	+ 3' 07"
8	René Van Meenen (BEL)	Groene Leeuw–SAS–Sinalco	+ 3' 40"
9	Antonio Karmany (ESP)	Kas–Royal Asport	+ 3' 57"
10	André Messelis (BEL)	Groene Leeuw–SAS–Sinalco	+ 4' 04"

== Stage 6 ==
1 May 1961 - Tortosa to Valencia, 188 km (117 mi)

Route:

Stage 6 result

Rank	Rider	Team	Time
1	Angelino Soler (ESP)	Faema	4h 54' 56"
2	Marcel Seynaeve (BEL)	Groene Leeuw–SAS–Sinalco	+ 30"
3	Antonio Accorsi (ITA)	Philco	+ 1' 00"
4	Francis Pipelin (FRA)	France	s.t.
5	Piet Damen (NED)	Netherlands	s.t.
6	Antonio Jiménez Quiles (ESP)	Kas–Royal Asport	s.t.
7	André Le Dissez (FRA)	France	s.t.
8	Constant De Keyser (BEL)	Groene Leeuw–SAS–Sinalco	+ 8' 47"
9	Antonio Suárez (ESP)	Faema	+ 8' 51"
10	Frans De Mulder (BEL)	Groene Leeuw–SAS–Sinalco	+ 10' 03"

== Stage 7 ==
2 May 1961 - Valencia to Benidorm, 141 km (88 mi)

Route:

Stage 7 result

Rank	Rider	Team	Time
1	René Van Meenen (BEL)	Groene Leeuw–SAS–Sinalco	3h 39' 39"
2	Huub Zilverberg (NED)	Netherlands	+ 30"
3	André Messelis (BEL)	Groene Leeuw–SAS–Sinalco	+ 2' 26"
4	Jef Lahaye (NED)	Groene Leeuw–SAS–Sinalco	s.t.
5	Antonio Gómez del Moral (ESP)	Faema	s.t.
6	Dick Enthoven (NED)	Netherlands	s.t.
7	Juan Campillo García (ESP)	Kas–Royal Asport	s.t.
8	Manuel Martín Piñera (ESP)	Kas–Royal Asport	s.t.
9	Jesús Galdeano (ESP)	Faema	s.t.
10	José Gómez del Moral (ESP)	Faema	s.t.

General classification after Stage 7

Rank	Rider	Team	Time
1	Marcel Seynaeve (BEL)	Groene Leeuw–SAS–Sinalco	31h 50' 44"
2	André Le Dissez (FRA)	France	+ 6' 02"
3	Angelino Soler (ESP)	Faema	+ 7' 06"
4	René Van Meenen (BEL)	Groene Leeuw–SAS–Sinalco	+ 7' 39"
5	Antonio Gómez del Moral (ESP)	Faema	+ 9' 22"
6	Antonio Jiménez Quiles (ESP)	Kas–Royal Asport	+ 9' 51"
7	André Messelis (BEL)	Groene Leeuw–SAS–Sinalco	+ 10' 19"
8	François Mahé (FRA)	France	+ 10' 45"
9	Piet Damen (NED)	Netherlands	+ 11' 00"
10	Guy Ignolin (FRA)	France	+ 11' 26"

== Stage 8 ==
3 May 1961 - Benidorm to Albacete, 211 km (131 mi)

Route:

Stage 8 result

Rank	Rider	Team	Time
1	José Pérez Francés (ESP)	Ferrys	5h 47' 41"
2	Antonio Gómez del Moral (ESP)	Faema	+ 30"
3	Francisco Moreno Martínez (ESP)	Faema	+ 1' 00"
4	Ángel Guardiola Ortiz (ESP)	Licor 43	s.t.
5	Emilio Hernan Diaz (ESP)	Licor 43	+ 1' 02"
6	Manuel Martín Piñera (ESP)	Kas–Royal Asport	+ 4' 54"
7	Fernando Manzaneque (ESP)	Licor 43	s.t.
8	Huub Zilverberg (NED)	Netherlands	s.t.
9	Tristano Tinarelli (ITA)	Philco	s.t.
10	Jesús Galdeano (ESP)	Faema	s.t.

General classification after Stage 8

Rank	Rider	Team	Time
1	Marcel Seynaeve (BEL)	Groene Leeuw–SAS–Sinalco	37h 43' 38"
2	André Le Dissez (FRA)	France	+ 6' 02"
3	Angelino Soler (ESP)	Faema	+ 7' 06"
4	René Van Meenen (BEL)	Groene Leeuw–SAS–Sinalco	+ 7' 39"
5	Antonio Gómez del Moral (ESP)	Faema	+ 9' 22"
6	José Pérez Francés (ESP)	Ferrys	+ 9' 24"
7	André Messelis (BEL)	Groene Leeuw–SAS–Sinalco	+ 10' 19"
8	François Mahé (FRA)	France	+ 10' 45"
9	Piet Damen (NED)	Netherlands	+ 11' 00"
10	Huub Zilverberg (NED)	Netherlands	+ 11' 16"
