= 1961 Vuelta a España, Stage 9 to Stage 16 =

Cycling race stages

The 1961 Vuelta a España was the 16th edition of the Vuelta a España, one of cycling's Grand Tours. The Vuelta began in San Sebastián, with a team time trial on 26 April, and Stage 9 occurred on 4 May with a stage from Albacete. The race finished in Bilbao on 11 May.

== Stage 9 ==
4 May 1961 - Albacete to Madrid, 198 km (123.0 mi)

Route:

Stage 9 result

Rank	Rider	Team	Time
1	Alves Barbosa (POR)	Portugal	5h 22' 40"
2	André Messelis (BEL)	Groene Leeuw–SAS–Sinalco	+ 30"
3	Manuel Martín Piñera (ESP)	Kas–Royal Asport	+ 1' 00"
4	Marcel Rohrbach (FRA)	France	s.t.
5	José Herrero Berrendero (ESP)	Faema	+ 1' 02"
6	Salvador Botella (ESP)	Faema	+ 2' 24"
7	Arturo Sabbadin (ITA)	Philco	s.t.
8	Gabriel Company (ESP)	Catigene	+ 2' 39"
9	Constant De Keyser (BEL)	Groene Leeuw–SAS–Sinalco	s.t.
10	Raymond Hoorelbeke (FRA)	France	+ 2' 40"

General classification after Stage 9

Rank	Rider	Team	Time
1	Marcel Seynaeve (BEL)	Groene Leeuw–SAS–Sinalco	43h 10' 00"
2	André Le Dissez (FRA)	France	+ 6' 02"
3	Angelino Soler (ESP)	Faema	+ 7' 06"
4	André Messelis (BEL)	Groene Leeuw–SAS–Sinalco	+ 7' 07"
5	René Van Meenen (BEL)	Groene Leeuw–SAS–Sinalco	+ 7' 39"
6	Marcel Rohrbach (FRA)	France	+ 9' 00"
7	Antonio Gómez del Moral (ESP)	Faema	+ 9' 22"
8	José Pérez Francés (ESP)	Ferrys	+ 9' 24"
9	François Mahé (FRA)	France	+ 10' 45"
10	Antonio Suárez (ESP)	Faema	+ 12' 29"

== Stage 10 ==
5 May 1961 - Madrid to Madrid, 195 km (121.2 mi)

Route:

Stage 10 result

Rank	Rider	Team	Time
1	Luis Otaño (ESP)	Licor 43	5h 06' 58"
2	François Mahé (FRA)	France	+ 31"
3	René Marigil (ESP)	Licor 43	+ 2' 24"
4	Vicente Iturat (ESP)	Catigene	+ 2' 36"
5	Frans De Mulder (BEL)	Groene Leeuw–SAS–Sinalco	s.t.
6	Fernando Manzaneque (ESP)	Licor 43	s.t.
7	André Messelis (BEL)	Groene Leeuw–SAS–Sinalco	s.t.
8	Antonio Suárez (ESP)	Faema	s.t.
9	Salvador Botella (ESP)	Faema	s.t.
10	Juan Campillo García (ESP)	Kas–Royal Asport	s.t.

General classification after Stage 10

Rank	Rider	Team	Time
1	Marcel Seynaeve (BEL)	Groene Leeuw–SAS–Sinalco	48h 19' 34"
2	André Le Dissez (FRA)	France	+ 6' 02"
3	Angelino Soler (ESP)	Faema	+ 7' 06"
4	André Messelis (BEL)	Groene Leeuw–SAS–Sinalco	+ 7' 07"
5	René Van Meenen (BEL)	Groene Leeuw–SAS–Sinalco	+ 7' 39"
6	François Mahé (FRA)	France	+ 8' 40"
7	Marcel Rohrbach (FRA)	France	+ 9' 00"
8	Antonio Gómez del Moral (ESP)	Faema	+ 9' 22"
9	José Pérez Francés (ESP)	Ferrys	+ 9' 24"
10	Antonio Suárez (ESP)	Faema	+ 12' 29"

== Stage 11 ==
6 May 1961 - Madrid to Valladolid, 189 km (117.4 mi)

Route:

Stage 11 result

Rank	Rider	Team	Time
1	Arthur Decabooter (BEL)	Groene Leeuw–SAS–Sinalco	5h 02' 34"
2	Arturo Sabbadin (ITA)	Philco	+ 30"
3	José Martín Colmenarejo (ESP)	Catigene	+ 1' 01"
4	Alves Barbosa (POR)	Portugal	s.t.
5	Jesús Galdeano (ESP)	Faema	s.t.
6	André Messelis (BEL)	Groene Leeuw–SAS–Sinalco	s.t.
7	Lucien Mathys (BEL)	Groene Leeuw–SAS–Sinalco	s.t.
8	Juan Campillo García (ESP)	Kas–Royal Asport	s.t.
9	René Marigil (ESP)	Licor 43	s.t.
10	Julio Jiménez (ESP)	Catigene	s.t.

General classification after Stage 11

Rank	Rider	Team	Time
1	André Messelis (BEL)	Groene Leeuw–SAS–Sinalco	53h 30' 16"
2	Marcel Seynaeve (BEL)	Groene Leeuw–SAS–Sinalco	+ 4' 01"
3	André Le Dissez (FRA)	France	+ 10' 23"
4	Alves Barbosa (POR)	Portugal	+ 10' 47"
5	Angelino Soler (ESP)	Faema	+ 11' 27"
6	René Van Meenen (BEL)	Groene Leeuw–SAS–Sinalco	+ 12' 00"
7	François Mahé (FRA)	France	+ 13' 01"
8	Marcel Rohrbach (FRA)	France	+ 13' 21"
9	Arthur Decabooter (BEL)	Groene Leeuw–SAS–Sinalco	+ 13' 42"
10	Antonio Gómez del Moral (ESP)	Faema	+ 13' 43"

== Stage 12 ==
7 May 1961 - Valladolid to Palencia, 48 km (29.8 mi) (ITT)

Route:

Stage 12 result

Rank	Rider	Team	Time
1	Antonio Suárez (ESP)	Faema	1h 07' 39"
2	Alfons Sweeck (BEL)	Groene Leeuw–SAS–Sinalco	+ 25"
3	José Martín Colmenarejo (ESP)	Catigene	+ 59"
4	Manuel Martín Piñera (ESP)	Kas–Royal Asport	+ 1' 18"
5	Jesús Loroño (ESP)	Ferrys	+ 1' 25"
6	Luis Otaño (ESP)	Licor 43	+ 1' 31"
7	Angelino Soler (ESP)	Faema	+ 1' 36"
8	Fernando Manzaneque (ESP)	Licor 43	+ 1' 44"
9	Antonio Accorsi (ITA)	Philco	+ 1' 51"
10	François Mahé (FRA)	France	+ 1' 53"

General classification after Stage 12

Rank	Rider	Team	Time
1	André Messelis (BEL)	Groene Leeuw–SAS–Sinalco	54h 40' 37"
2	Marcel Seynaeve (BEL)	Groene Leeuw–SAS–Sinalco	+ 7' 42"
3	Angelino Soler (ESP)	Faema	+ 10' 11"
4	François Mahé (FRA)	France	+ 12' 12"
5	José Pérez Francés (ESP)	Ferrys	+ 12' 38"
6	Alves Barbosa (POR)	Portugal	+ 12' 46"
7	André Le Dissez (FRA)	France	+ 13' 05"
8	Antonio Suárez (ESP)	Faema	+ 13' 08"
9	Antonio Gómez del Moral (ESP)	Faema	+ 13' 34"
10	Arthur Decabooter (BEL)	Groene Leeuw–SAS–Sinalco	+ 15' 48"

== Stage 13 ==
8 May 1961 - Palencia to Santander, 220 km (140 mi)

Route:

Stage 13 result

Rank	Rider	Team	Time
1	Francisco Moreno Martínez (ESP)	Faema	6h 00' 46"
2	Manuel Martín Piñera (ESP)	Kas–Royal Asport	+ 30"
3	Arthur Decabooter (BEL)	Groene Leeuw–SAS–Sinalco	+ 3' 45"
4	Vicente Iturat (ESP)	Catigene	s.t.
5	Frans De Mulder (BEL)	Groene Leeuw–SAS–Sinalco	s.t.
6	José Pérez Francés (ESP)	Ferrys	s.t.
7	André Messelis (BEL)	Groene Leeuw–SAS–Sinalco	s.t.
8	Salvador Botella (ESP)	Faema	s.t.
9	Antonio Suárez (ESP)	Faema	s.t.
10	Constant De Keyser (BEL)	Groene Leeuw–SAS–Sinalco	s.t.

== Stage 14 ==
9 May 1961 - Santander to Vitoria, 235 km (146 mi)

Stage 14 result

Rank	Rider	Team	Time
1	François Mahé (FRA)	France	6h 54' 30"
2	José Pérez Francés (ESP)	Ferrys	+ 30"
3	Arturo Sabbadin (ITA)	Philco	+ 1' 00"
4	Angelino Soler (ESP)	Faema	s.t.
5	Vicente Iturat (ESP)	Catigene	s.t.
6	Luis Otaño (ESP)	Licor 43	s.t.
7	Carmelo Morales Erostarbe (ESP)	Licor 43	s.t.
8	Antonio Suárez (ESP)	Faema	s.t.
9	Jesús Loroño (ESP)	Ferrys	s.t.
10	Antonio Gómez del Moral (ESP)	Faema	s.t.

General classification after Stage 14

Rank	Rider	Team	Time
1	André Messelis (BEL)	Groene Leeuw–SAS–Sinalco	67h 49' 35"
2	Angelino Soler (ESP)	Faema	+ 1' 24"
3	François Mahé (FRA)	France	+ 2' 15"
4	José Pérez Francés (ESP)	Ferrys	+ 3' 47"
5	Antonio Suárez (ESP)	Faema	+ 4' 11"
6	Antonio Gómez del Moral (ESP)	Faema	+ 4' 37"
7	Fernando Manzaneque (ESP)	Licor 43	+ 7' 11"
8	Antonio Karmany (ESP)	Kas–Royal Asport	+ 8' 50"
9	Vicente Iturat (ESP)	Catigene	+ 9' 00"
10	Jesús Loroño (ESP)	Ferrys	+ 9' 14"

== Stage 15 ==
10 May 1961 - Vitoria to Bilbao, 179 km (111 mi)

Route:

Stage 15 result

Rank	Rider	Team	Time
1	Antonio Karmany (ESP)	Kas–Royal Asport	4h 45' 43"
2	Carmelo Morales Erostarbe (ESP)	Licor 43	+ 44"
3	Jesús Loroño (ESP)	Ferrys	+ 1' 16"
4	Vicente Iturat (ESP)	Catigene	s.t.
5	Juan Campillo García (ESP)	Kas–Royal Asport	+ 1' 19"
6	Fernando Manzaneque (ESP)	Licor 43	s.t.
7	José Pérez Francés (ESP)	Ferrys	s.t.
8	Arturo Sabbadin (ITA)	Philco	s.t.
9	Salvador Botella (ESP)	Faema	s.t.
10	Angelino Soler (ESP)	Faema	s.t.

General classification after Stage 15

Rank	Rider	Team	Time
1	Angelino Soler (ESP)	Faema	72h 38' 01"
2	François Mahé (FRA)	France	+ 51"
3	José Pérez Francés (ESP)	Ferrys	+ 2' 23"
4	Antonio Suárez (ESP)	Faema	+ 2' 47"
5	Antonio Gómez del Moral (ESP)	Faema	+ 3' 13"
6	Fernando Manzaneque (ESP)	Licor 43	+ 5' 47"
7	Antonio Karmany (ESP)	Kas–Royal Asport	+ 6' 07"
8	André Messelis (BEL)	Groene Leeuw–SAS–Sinalco	+ 6' 18"
9	Vicente Iturat (ESP)	Catigene	+ 7' 36"
10	Carmelo Morales Erostarbe (ESP)	Licor 43	+ 7' 38"

== Stage 16 ==
11 May 1961 - Bilbao to Bilbao, 159 km (99 mi)

Route:

Stage 16 result

Rank	Rider	Team	Time
1	Gabriel Company (ESP)	Catigene	4h 51' 21"
2	Vicente Iturat (ESP)	Catigene	+ 4' 49"
3	Arturo Sabbadin (ITA)	Philco	+ 5' 18"
4	José Pérez Francés (ESP)	Ferrys	+ 6' 55"
5	Antonio Gómez del Moral (ESP)	Faema	s.t.
6	Carmelo Morales Erostarbe (ESP)	Licor 43	s.t.
7	René Marigil (ESP)	Licor 43	s.t.
8	Juan Campillo García (ESP)	Kas–Royal Asport	s.t.
9	Antonio Suárez (ESP)	Faema	s.t.
10	Angelino Soler (ESP)	Faema	s.t.

General classification after Stage 16

Rank	Rider	Team	Time
1	Angelino Soler (ESP)	Faema	77h 36' 17"
2	François Mahé (FRA)	France	+ 51"
3	José Pérez Francés (ESP)	Ferrys	+ 2' 23"
4	Antonio Suárez (ESP)	Faema	+ 2' 47"
5	Antonio Gómez del Moral (ESP)	Faema	+ 3' 13"
6	Vicente Iturat (ESP)	Catigene	+ 5' 29"
7	Fernando Manzaneque (ESP)	Licor 43	+ 5' 47"
8	Antonio Karmany (ESP)	Kas–Royal Asport	+ 6' 07"
9	Carmelo Morales Erostarbe (ESP)	Licor 43	+ 7' 38"
10	Jesús Loroño (ESP)	Ferrys	+ 7' 47"
