= Vuelta a España records and statistics =

The Vuelta a España is an important cycling race (one of the Grand Tours). The first Vuelta a España was in 1935. As the Vuelta a España is a stage race, a classification based on times is calculated after every stage. The cyclist with the lowest time after a stage is the leader of the general classification after that stage. A jersey is given to that cyclist, which the cyclist wears during the next stage. From 1999 to 2009, this jersey had a golden color and was named the golden jersey. From 2010 onwards, the leader's jersey was red. It has also been black and white at different points in the Vuelta's history.

Although the leader of the classification after a stage gets the leader's jersey, he is not considered the winner of that jersey, only the wearer. Only after the final stage, the wearer of the leader's jersey is considered the winner, and therefore the winner of the Vuelta a España.

Since the first Vuelta a España in 1935, there have been 1,491 stages, up to and including the Stage 12 of the 2021 Vuelta a España The race leader following each stage has been awarded a leader's jersey.

Although the number of stages is 1,491, there have been 1,492 leader's jerseys awarded, because after the first stage of the 1948 Vuelta a España, Bernardo Ruiz and Julián Berrendero shared the lead and both received the leader's jersey. As of 2021, 1,492 leader's jerseys have been awarded in the Vuelta a España to 226 different riders.

== Jerseys per rider ==
Key:

Cyclists who are still active

In previous Vueltas a España, sometimes a stage was split in two. On such occasions, only the cyclist leading at the end of the day is counted. The "Leader's jerseys" column gives the number of days that the cyclist wore the leader's jersey, the "Vuelta wins" column gives the number of times that the cyclist won the Vuelta. The next three columns indicate the number of times the rider won the points classification, the mountains classification, and the years in which the rider lead the general classification, with bold years indicating an overall Vuelta win.

For example: Alex Zülle has spent 48 days in the leader's jersey, and won the overall classification two times. He wore the leader's jersey in the Vueltas of 1993, 1996, 1997 and 2000, of which he won the 1996 and 1997 Vueltas.

Rank	Name	Country	Leader's jerseys	General	Points	KoM	Years
1	Alex Zülle	Switzerland	48	2	0	0	1993, 1996, 1997, 2000
2	Primož Roglič	Slovenia	42	4	2	0	2019, 2020, 2021, 2022, 2024
3	Roberto Heras	Spain	36	4	1	0	2000, 2002, 2003, 2004, 2005
4=	Gustaaf Deloor	Belgium	32	2	0	0	1935, 1936
4=	Tony Rominger	Switzerland	32	3	1	2	1992, 1993, 1994
6	Delio Rodríguez	Spain	31	1	1	0	1941, 1945, 1946, 1947
7=	Julián Berrendero	Spain	27	2	0	3	1941, 1942, 1945, 1948
7=	Chris Froome	UK	27	2	1	0	2011, 2017
7=	Alejandro Valverde	Spain	27	1	4	0	2006, 2008, 2009, 2012, 2014
10	Alberto Contador	Spain	26	3	0	0	2008, 2012, 2014
11=	Laurent Jalabert	France	24	1	4	1	1995, 1996, 1997, 1998
11=	Domingo Perurena	Spain	24	0	2	0	1967, 1970, 1971, 1972, 1974, 1975
13	Abraham Olano	Spain	23	1	0	0	1995, 1998, 1999, 2000
14	Óscar Sevilla	Spain	21	0	0	0	2001, 2002
15=	Manuel Costa	Spain	20	0	0	0	1946, 1947
15=	Freddy Maertens	Belgium	20	1	1	0	1977
15=	Denis Menchov	Russia	20	2	0	1	2005, 2007
15=	Vincenzo Nibali	Italy	20	1	0	0	2010, 2013
19=	Remco Evenepoel	Belgium	19	1	0	0	2022, 2023
19=	Emilio Rodríguez	Spain	19	1	0	2	1950
19=	Joaquim Rodríguez	Spain	19	0	0	0	2003, 2010, 2011, 2012, 2015
22	Melcior Mauri	Spain	18	1	0	0	1991
23	René Pijnen	Netherlands	17	0	0	0	1970, 1971, 1972
24=	Angelo Conterno	Italy	16	1	0	0	1956
24=	José Manuel Fuente	Spain	16	2	0	1	1972, 1974
24=	Isidro Nozal	Spain	16	0	0	0	2003
27=	Jacques Anquetil	France	15	1	0	0	1963
27=	Pedro Delgado	Spain	15	2	0	0	1984, 1985, 1989
27=	Bernard Hinault	France	15	2	0	0	1978, 1983
27=	Nairo Quintana	Colombia	15	1	0	0	2014, 2016, 2019
27=	Faustino Rupérez	Spain	15	1	0	0	1980
27=	Jonas Vingegaard	Denmark	15	1	0	0	2025
33=	Rudi Altig	Germany	14	1	1	0	1962, 1968
33=	Laudelino Cubino	Spain	14	0	0	0	1988
33=	Sepp Kuss	United States	14	0	0	0	2023
33=	Dalmacio Langarica	Spain	14	1	0	0	1946, 1948
33=	Miguel María Lasa	Spain	14	0	1	0	1971, 1972, 1975
38=	Robert Millar	UK	13	0	0	0	1985, 1986
38=	Ben O'Connor	Australia	13	0	0	0	2024
38=	Joop Zoetemelk	Netherlands	13	1	0	1	1979
41=	Giovanni Battaglin	Italy	12	1	0	0	1981
41=	Marco Giovannetti	Italy	12	1	0	0	1990
41=	Enric Mas	Spain	12	0	0	0	2026
41=	Jesús Montoya	Spain	12	0	0	0	1992
41=	Álvaro Pino	Spain	12	1	0	1	1983, 1986
41=	Fermín Trueba	Spain	12	0	0	0	1941
47=	Luis Herrera	Colombia	11	1	0	2	1987
47=	Jean-Pierre Ducasse	France	11	0	0	0	1967
47=	Bernardo Ruiz	Spain	11	1	0	1	1948
47=	Rik Van Looy	Belgium	11	0	1	0	1958, 1959, 1964, 1965
47=	Rolf Wolfshohl	Germany	11	1	0	0	1965
47=	Simon Yates	UK	11	1	0	0	2018
53	Jan Ullrich	Germany	10	1	0	0	1999
54=	Seamus Elliott	Ireland	9	0	0	0	1962
54=	Omar Hernández	Colombia	9	0	0	0	1989
54=	Jesús Loroño	Spain	9	1	0	0	1955, 1957
54=	Eddy Merckx	Belgium	9	1	1	0	1973
54=	Pello Ruiz Cabestany	Spain	9	0	0	0	1985, 1990, 1992
54=	Agustín Tamames	Spain	9	1	0	1	1970, 1971, 1975
54=	Valentín Uriona	Spain	9	0	0	0	1966
54=	Ferdi Van Den Haute	Belgium	9	0	1	0	1978
62=	Éric Caritoux	France	8	1	0	0	1984
62=	Régis Clère	France	8	0	0	0	1981
62=	Marc Gomez	France	8	0	0	0	1982, 1986
62=	Julián Gorospe	Spain	8	0	0	0	1983, 1990
62=	José Pesarrodona	Spain	8	1	0	0	1973, 1976
62=	Ángel Arroyo	Spain	7	0	0	0	1982
62=	Fabio Aru	Italy	7	1	0	0	2015
67=	Joseba Beloki	Spain	7	0	0	0	2001, 2002
67=	Odd Christian Eiking	Norway	7	0	0	0	2021
67=	Sean Kelly	Ireland	7	1	4	0	1987, 1988
67=	Marino Lejarreta	Spain	7	1	1	0	1982, 1983
67=	Christian Levavasseur	France	7	0	0	0	1979
67=	Francesco Moser	Italy	7	0	0	0	1984
67=	Luis Ocaña	Spain	7	1	0	1	1969, 1970
67=	Roger Pingeon	France	7	1	0	0	1969
67=	Tadej Pogačar	Slovenia	7	0	0	0	2026
67=	Raymond Poulidor	France	7	1	0	0	1964, 1965
67=	Jean Stablinski	France	7	1	0	0	1958
67=	Dietrich Thurau	Germany	7	0	1	0	1976
81=	Ferdinand Bracke	Belgium	6	1	0	0	1971
81=	Esteban Chaves	Colombia	6	0	0	0	2015
81=	Claude Criquielion	Belgium	6	0	0	0	1982
81=	Armand Desmet	Belgium	6	0	0	0	1960
81=	Jean Dotto	France	6	1	0	0	1955
81=	Tom Dumoulin	Netherlands	6	0	0	0	2015
87=	Igor Antón	Spain	5	0	0	0	2010
87=	Fabian Cancellara	Switzerland	5	0	0	0	2009
87=	Richard Carapaz	Ecuador	5	0	0	0	2020
87=	Sylvain Chavanel	France	5	0	0	0	2008, 2011
87=	Anselmo Fuerte	Spain	5	0	0	0	1988, 1991
87=	Dominique Gaigne	France	5	0	0	0	1983
87=	Philippe Gilbert	Belgium	5	0	0	0	2010
87=	Chris Horner	United States	5	1	0	0	2013
87=	Jan Janssen	Netherlands	5	1	2	0	1967, 1968
87=	Antonio Karmany	Spain	5	0	0	3	1959
87=	Floyd Landis	United States	5	0	0	0	2004
87=	Rudy Molard	France	5	0	0	0	2018, 2022
87=	Luis Otaño	Spain	5	0	0	0	1964
87=	José Pérez Francés	Spain	5	0	1	0	1964, 1968
87=	Marcel Seynaeve	Belgium	5	0	0	0	1961
87=	Roberto Visentini	Italy	5	0	0	0	1980
87=	Alexander Vinokourov	Kazakhstan	5	1	0	0	2006
104=	Joaquim Agostinho	Portugal	4	0	0	0	1976
104=	Darwin Atapuma	Colombia	4	0	0	0	2016
104=	Federico Bahamontes	Spain	4	0	0	2	1957
104=	Fabio Baldato	Italy	4	0	0	0	1996
104=	Daniele Bennati	Italy	4	0	1	0	2007, 2008, 2011
104=	Ángel Casero	Spain	4	1	0	0	2000, 2001
104=	Reimund Dietzen	Germany	4	0	0	0	1987
104=	Vladimir Efimkin	Russia	4	0	0	0	2007
104=	Francisco Gabica	Spain	4	1	0	1	1966
104=	Felice Gimondi	Italy	4	1	0	0	1968
104=	Miguel Induráin	Spain	4	0	0	0	1985
104=	José María Jiménez	Spain	4	0	1	4	1998
104=	Viktor Klimov	Soviet Union	4	0	0	0	1990
104=	Michał Kwiatkowski	Poland	4	0	0	0	2016, 2018
104=	Egoi Martínez	Spain	4	0	0	1	2008
104=	Bradley McGee	Australia	4	0	0	0	2005
104=	André Messelis	Belgium	4	0	0	0	1961
104=	Lars Michaelsen	Denmark	4	0	0	0	1997
104=	Nicolas Roche	Ireland	4	0	0	0	2013, 2019
104=	Raymond Steegmans	Belgium	4	0	1	0	1969
104=	Antonio Suárez	Spain	4	1	1	1	1959
104=	Roger Swerts	Belgium	4	0	0	0	1974, 1975
104=	Torstein Træen	Norway	4	0	0	0	2025
104=	Bradley Wiggins	UK	4	0	0	0	2011
128=	Antonio Barrutia	Spain	3	0	0	0	1960, 1962
128=	Manuel Beltrán	Spain	3	0	0	0	2004
128=	Omer Braeckeveldt	Belgium	3	0	0	0	1950
128=	Janez Brajkovič	Slovenia	3	0	0	0	2006, 2013
128=	Jonathan Castroviejo	Spain	3	0	0	0	2012, 2014
128=	José De Cauwer	Belgium	3	0	0	0	1976
128=	Daan de Groot	Netherlands	3	0	0	0	1958
128=	Frans De Mulder	Belgium	3	1	0	0	1960
128=	Pierre Everaert	France	3	0	0	0	1959
128=	Alberto Fernández	Spain	3	0	0	0	1983
128=	Raphaël Géminiani	France	3	0	0	0	1955
128=	Fabrizio Guidi	Italy	3	0	1	0	1997, 1998
128=	Thor Hushovd	Norway	3	0	1	0	2006
128=	Hennie Kuiper	Netherlands	3	0	0	0	1976
128=	Roland Le Clerc	France	3	0	0	0	1989
128=	Miguel Ángel López	Colombia	3	0	0	0	2019
128=	Fernando Manzaneque	Spain	3	0	0	0	1960
128=	Michael Matthews	Australia	3	0	0	0	2014
128=	David Millar	UK	3	0	0	0	2001
128=	Ramón Sáez	Spain	3	0	0	0	1969
128=	José Segú	Spain	3	0	0	0	1959
128=	Eusebio Vélez	Spain	3	0	0	0	1961, 1964
128=	Michael Wright	UK	3	0	0	0	1968, 1969
151=	Gilbert Bauvin	France	2	0	0	0	1955
151=	Santiago Botero	Colombia	2	0	0	0	2001
151=	Mark Cavendish	UK	2	0	1	0	2010
151=	Biagio Conte	Italy	2	0	0	0	1996
151=	Rohan Dennis	Australia	2	0	0	0	2017, 2018
151=	Danilo Di Luca	Italy	2	0	0	0	2006
151=	Laurent Dufaux	Switzerland	2	0	0	0	1997
151=	Jacky Durand	France	2	0	0	0	1999
151=	Javier Elorriaga	Spain	2	0	0	0	1976
151=	José María Errandonea	Spain	2	0	0	0	1966
151=	Óscar Freire	Spain	2	0	0	0	2007
151=	Igor González de Galdeano	Spain	2	0	0	0	1999, 2003
151=	André Greipel	Germany	2	0	1	0	2009
151=	Cees Haast	Netherlands	2	0	0	0	1966
151=	Jesús Herrada	Spain	2	0	0	0	2018
151=	Benoît Joachim	Luxembourg	2	0	0	0	2004
151=	Gerben Karstens	Netherlands	2	0	0	0	1973
151=	Levi Leipheimer	United States	2	0	0	0	2008
151=	René Marigil	Spain	2	0	0	0	1955
151=	Lenny Martinez	France	2	0	0	0	2023
151=	Bert Oosterbosch	Netherlands	2	0	0	0	1985
151=	Miguel Pacheco	Spain	2	0	0	0	1958
151=	Roberto Pagnin	Italy	2	0	0	0	1987
151=	Luigi Sgarbozza	Italy	2	0	0	0	1969
151=	Angelino Soler	Spain	2	1	0	0	1961
151=	Rein Taaramäe	Estonia	2	0	0	0	2021
151=	José Luis Talamillo	Spain	2	0	0	0	1961
151=	Bernard Thévenet	France	2	0	0	0	1974
151=	Wout van Aert	Belgium	2	0	0	0	2024
151=	Edward Van Dijck	Belgium	2	1	0	1	1947
151=	Marcel Wüst	Germany	2	0	0	0	1999
151=	Markus Zberg	Switzerland	2	0	0	0	1998
183=	Edoardo Affini	Italy	1	0	0	0	2022
183=	Felipe Alberdi	Spain	1	0	0	0	1960
183=	Alessandro Ballan	Italy	1	0	0	0	2008
183=	Jesús Blanco Villar	Spain	1	0	0	0	1986
183=	Salvador Botella	Spain	1	0	1	0	1957
183=	Miguel Chacón	Spain	1	0	0	0	1957
183=	Hilaire Couvreur	Belgium	1	0	0	0	1958
183=	David de la Cruz	Spain	1	0	0	0	2016
183=	Michele Dancelli	Italy	1	0	0	0	1967
183=	Stijn Devolder	Belgium	1	0	0	0	2007
183=	Herminio Díaz Zabala	Spain	1	0	0	0	1991
183=	Antoine Dignef	Belgium	1	0	0	0	1935
183=	Kenny Elissonde	France	1	0	0	0	2021
183=	Antonio Escuriet	Spain	1	0	0	0	1935
183=	Nicolas Edet	France	1	0	0	0	2019
183=	Cadel Evans	Australia	1	0	0	0	2009
183=	José Martín Farfán	Colombia	1	0	0	1	1989
183=	Rubén Fernández	Spain	1	0	0	0	2016
183=	Jakob Fuglsang	Denmark	1	0	0	0	2011
183=	Jesús Galdeano	Spain	1	0	0	0	1960
183=	David Gaudu	France	1	0	0	0	2025
183=	Robert Gesink	Netherlands	1	0	0	0	2022
183=	Frans Gielen	Belgium	1	0	0	0	1948
183=	Aitor González	Spain	1	1	0	0	2002
183=	Santos González	Spain	1	0	0	0	2000
183=	Max van Heeswijk	Netherlands	1	0	0	0	2004
183=	Joseph Huts	Belgium	1	0	0	0	1936
183=	Julio Jiménez	Spain	1	0	0	3	1964
183=	Peter Kennaugh	UK	1	0	0	0	2016
183=	Marnix Lameire	Belgium	1	0	0	0	1989
183=	Yves Lampaert	Belgium	1	0	0	0	2017
183=	Pablo Lastras	Spain	1	0	0	0	2011
183=	José Manuel López Rodríguez	Spain	1	0	0	0	1967
183=	François Mahé	France	1	0	0	0	1961
183=	Thierry Marie	France	1	0	0	0	1986
183=	Manuel Martín Piñera	Spain	1	0	0	0	1968
183=	Gabriel Mas	Spain	1	0	0	0	1960
183=	Brandon McNulty	United States	1	0	1	0	2024
183=	Lorenzo Milesi	Italy	1	0	0	0	2023
183=	Bauke Mollema	Netherlands	1	0	1	0	2011
183=	José Antonio Momeñe	Spain	1	0	0	0	1966
183=	Carmelo Morales	Spain	1	0	0	0	1957
183=	Daniel Moreno	Spain	1	0	0	0	2013
183=	Francisco Moreno	Spain	1	0	0	0	1957
183=	Jelle Nijdam	Netherlands	1	0	0	0	1992
183=	Joaquín Olmos	Spain	1	0	0	0	1946
183=	Ettore Pastorelli	Italy	1	0	0	0	1988
183=	Jasper Philipsen	Belgium	1	0	0	0	2025
183=	Gianluca Pianegonda	Italy	1	0	0	0	1995
183=	Andrea Piccolo	Italy	1	0	0	0	2023
183=	Filippo Pozzato	Italy	1	0	0	0	2008
183=	Carlos Sastre	Spain	1	0	0	1	2006
183=	Mike Teunissen	Netherlands	1	0	0	0	2022
183=	Dylan Teuns	Belgium	1	0	0	0	2019
183=	Benny Van Brabant	Belgium	1	0	0	0	1989
183=	Rik Van Steenbergen	Belgium	1	0	1	0	1956
183=	Jean-Luc Vandenbroucke	Belgium	1	0	0	0	1987
183=	Peter Velits	Slovakia	1	0	0	0	2015
183=	Joseph Vloeberghs	Belgium	1	0	0	0	1959
183=	Mikel Zarrabeitia	Spain	1	0	0	0	2002

== Jerseys per country ==
The leader's jersey has been awarded to 24 different countries since 1935. In the table below, "Jerseys" indicates the number of leader's jerseys that were given to cyclists of each country. "Vuelta wins" stands for the number of Vuelta wins by cyclists of that country, "Points" for the number of times the points classification was won by a cyclist of that country and "KoM" for the number of times the mountains classification was won by a cyclist of that country. "Combo'" shows the winners of the combination classification, This classification is calculated by adding the numeral ranks of each cyclist in the general, points, and mountains classifications (a rider must have a score in all). The "Most recent" column shows the cyclist of the country that wore the leader's jersey most recently. The "Different holders" column gives the number of different cyclists of the country that wore the leader's jersey.

#	Country		Vuelta Wins	Points	KoM	Combo'	Most recent cyclist	Most recent date	Holders
1	Spain	654	33	17	50	14	Enric Mas	2026, stage 21	86
2	Belgium	166	8	14	2	2	Jasper Philipsen	2025, stage 1	32
3	France	160	9	5	9	2	David Gaudu	2025, stage 4	27
4	Italy	110	6	5	4	1	Andrea Piccolo	2023, stage 1	23
5	Switzerland	89	5	2	2	1	Fabian Cancellara	2009, stage 7	5
6	United Kingdom	64	3	3	0	3	Simon Yates	2018, stage 21	8
7	Netherlands	58	2	6	1	0	Mike Teunissen	2022, stage 2	14
8	Slovenia	52	4	2	0	0	Tadej Pogačar	2026, stage 7	3
9	Colombia	51	2	0	7	2	Nairo Quintana	2019, stage 9	8
10	Germany	50	3	8	0	0	André Greipel	2009, stage 6	7
11	United States	27	2	0	0	1	Brandon McNulty	2024, stage 1	5
12	Russia	24	2	0	1	1	Denis Menchov	2007, stage 21	2
13	Australia	23	0	2	4	0	Ben O'Connor	2024, stage 18	5
14=	Ireland	20	1	4	0	2	Nicolas Roche	2019, stage 4	3
14=	Denmark	20	1	2	0	0	Jonas Vingegaard	2025, stage 21	3
16	Norway	14	0	1	0	0	Torstein Træen	2025, stage 9	3
17=	Kazakhstan	5	1	0	0	1	Alexander Vinokourov	2006, stage 21	1
17=	Ecuador	5	0	0	1	0	Richard Carapaz	2020, stage 12	1
19=	Portugal	4	0	0	0	0	Joaquim Agostinho	1976, stage 16	1
19=	Soviet Union	4	0	0	0	0	Viktor Klimov	1990, stage 5	1
19=	Poland	4	0	0	0	0	Michał Kwiatkowski	2018, stage 4	1
22=	Luxembourg	2	0	0	0	0	Benoît Joachim	2004, stage 4	1
22=	Estonia	2	0	0	0	0	Rein Taaramäe	2021, stage 4	1
24	Slovakia	1	0	0	0	0	Peter Velits	2015, Stage 1	1
–	East Germany	0	0	1	0	0	-	-	0
–	Uzbekistan	0	0	1	0	0	-	-	0

== Stage wins per rider ==
The table below shows the 17 riders who have won more than 9 stages at the Vuelta. Riders who are still active are indicated in bold.

Rank	Name	Country	Wins	First win	Last win
1	Delio Rodríguez	Spain	39	1941	1947
2	Alessandro Petacchi	Italy	20	2000	2010
3=	Rik Van Looy	Belgium	18	1958	1965
3=	Laurent Jalabert	France	18	1993	1997
5	Sean Kelly	Ireland	16	1979	1988
6	**Primož Roglič**	Slovenia	15	2019	2024
7	Gerben Karstens	Netherlands	14	1966	1976
8=	Freddy Maertens	Belgium	13	1977	1977
8=	Tony Rominger	Switzerland	13	1992	1996
10=	Domingo Perurena	Spain	12	1966	1978
10=	Marcel Wüst	Germany	12	1995	1999
10=	Alejandro Valverde	Spain	12	2003	2019
13=	Julián Berrendero	Spain	11	1941	1948
13=	Agustín Tamames	Spain	11	1970	1975
15=	Eddy Planckaert	Belgium	10	1982	1989
15=	Roberto Heras	Spain	10	1997	2005
15=	**John Degenkolb**	Germany	10	2012	2015

Three riders have won 8 or more stages in a single year:

- Freddy Maertens (BEL) - **13** (1977, in addition to one 2nd and two 3rd places; only once outside the top 10)
- Delio Rodríguez (ESP) - **12** (1941, in addition to three 2nd and three 3rd places), - **8** (1942, 1947)
- Rik Van Looy (BEL) - **8** (1965)

== Stage wins per country ==
Riders and teams representing 37 countries have won at least one stage in the Vuelta. Tables are correct as of 13 September 2026

Country	#
Spain	568
Belgium	241
Italy	192
France	131
Netherlands	119
Germany	71
Colombia	38
United Kingdom	38
Switzerland	34
Ireland	31
Denmark	30
Australia	27
Slovenia	24

Country	#
United States	18
Russia	17
Portugal	12
Kazakhstan	8
Uzbekistan	7
Czech Republic	7
Norway	7
Soviet Union	5
Slovakia	5
Luxembourg	5
Poland	5
Canada	4

Country	#
East Germany	3
Austria	3
Estonia	3
South Africa	3
Ecuador	3
Ukraine	2
New Zealand	2
Sweden	2
Belarus	2
Venezuela	1
Argentina	1
United Arab Emirates	1

=== Detailed table ===
Year	(Spain)	(Belgium)	(Italy)	(France)	(Netherlands)	(Germany)	(Colombia)	(United Kingdom)	(Switzerland)	(Republic of Ireland)	(Denmark)	(Australia)	(Slovenia)	(United States)	(Russia)	(Portugal)	(Kazakhstan)	(Uzbekistan)	(Czech Republic)	(Norway)	(Soviet Union)	(Slovakia)	(Luxembourg)	(Poland)	(Canada)	(East Germany)	(Austria)	(Estonia)	(South Africa)	(Ecuador)	(Ukraine)	(New Zealand)	(Sweden)	(Belarus)	(Venezuela)	(Argentina)	(United Arab Emirates)
1935	4	7	1	-	-	-	-	-	-	-	-	-	-	-	-	-	-	-	-	-	-	-	-	-	-	-	2	-	-	-	-	-	-	-	-	-	-
1936	11	8	2	-	-	-	-	-	-	-	-	-	-	-	-	-	-	-	-	-	-	-	-	-	-	-	-	-	-	-	-	-	-	-	-	-	-
1941	22	-	-	-	-	-	-	-	-	-	-	-	-	-	-	-	-	-	-	-	-	-	-	-	-	-	-	-	-	-	-	-	-	-	-	-	-
1942	13	-	3	4	-	-	-	-	-	-	-	-	-	-	-	-	-	-	-	-	-	-	-	-	-	-	-	-	-	-	-	-	-	-	-	-	-
1945	17	-	-	-	-	-	-	-	-	-	-	-	-	-	-	2	-	-	-	-	-	-	-	-	-	-	-	-	-	-	-	-	-	-	-	-	-
1946	20	-	-	-	2	-	-	-	-	-	-	-	-	-	-	1	-	-	-	-	-	-	-	-	-	-	-	-	-	-	-	-	-	-	-	-	-
1947	17	2	6	-	-	-	-	-	-	-	-	-	-	-	-	-	-	-	-	-	-	-	-	-	-	-	-	-	-	-	-	-	-	-	-	-	-
1948	16	4	1	-	-	-	-	-	-	-	-	-	-	-	-	-	-	-	-	-	-	-	-	-	-	-	-	-	-	-	-	-	-	-	-	-	-
1950	17	3	5	-	-	-	-	-	-	-	-	-	-	-	-	-	-	-	-	-	-	-	-	-	-	-	-	-	-	-	-	-	-	-	-	-	-
1955	4	-	9	2	-	-	-	-	-	-	-	-	-	-	-	-	-	-	-	-	-	-	-	-	-	-	-	-	-	-	-	-	-	-	-	-	-
1956	4	6	3	5	-	-	-	-	1	-	-	-	-	-	-	-	-	-	-	-	-	-	-	-	-	-	-	-	-	-	-	-	-	-	-	-	-
1957	7	2	3	3	-	-	-	-	-	-	-	-	-	-	-	-	-	-	-	-	-	-	-	-	-	-	-	-	-	-	-	-	-	-	-	-	-
1958	5	8	3	3	-	-	-	-	-	-	-	-	-	-	-	-	-	-	-	-	-	-	-	-	-	-	-	-	-	-	-	-	-	-	-	-	-
1959	9	4	-	4	-	-	-	-	-	-	-	-	-	-	-	1	-	-	-	-	-	-	-	-	-	-	-	-	-	-	-	-	-	-	-	-	-
1960	9	8	1	-	-	-	-	-	-	-	-	-	-	-	-	-	-	-	-	-	-	-	-	-	-	-	-	-	-	-	-	-	-	-	-	-	-
1961	9	4	-	3	-	-	-	-	-	-	-	-	-	-	-	1	-	-	-	-	-	-	-	-	-	-	-	-	-	-	-	-	-	-	-	-	-
1962	3	-	2	7	1	3	-	-	-	1	-	-	-	-	-	-	-	-	-	-	-	-	-	-	-	-	-	-	-	-	-	-	-	-	-	-	-
1963	6	5	-	4	1	-	-	-	-	1	-	-	-	-	-	-	-	-	-	-	-	-	-	-	-	-	-	-	-	-	-	-	-	-	-	-	-
1964	7	8	-	1	1	-	-	2	-	-	-	-	-	-	-	-	-	-	-	-	-	-	-	-	-	-	-	-	-	-	-	-	-	-	-	-	-
1965	7	9	-	3	-	1	-	-	-	-	-	-	-	-	-	-	-	-	-	-	-	-	-	-	-	-	-	-	-	-	-	-	-	-	-	-	-
1966	10	-	3	-	9	-	-	-	-	-	-	-	-	-	-	-	-	-	-	-	-	-	-	-	-	-	-	-	-	-	-	-	-	-	-	-	-
1967	5	2	-	2	9	1	-	2	-	-	-	-	-	-	-	-	-	-	-	-	-	-	-	-	-	-	-	-	-	-	-	-	-	-	-	-	-
1968	8	1	3	-	2	3	-	2	-	-	-	-	-	-	-	-	-	-	-	-	-	-	-	-	-	-	-	-	-	-	-	-	-	-	-	-	-
1969	11	3	3	2	-	-	-	2	-	-	-	-	-	-	-	-	-	-	-	-	-	-	-	-	-	-	-	-	-	-	-	-	-	-	-	-	-
1970	8	8	-	1	4	-	-	-	-	-	-	-	-	-	-	-	-	-	-	-	-	-	1	-	-	-	-	-	-	-	-	-	-	-	-	-	-
1971	3	8	-	2	7	-	-	-	-	-	-	-	-	-	-	-	-	-	-	-	-	-	-	-	-	-	-	-	-	-	-	-	-	-	-	-	-
1972	12	2	-	-	7	-	-	-	-	-	-	-	-	-	-	-	-	-	-	-	-	-	-	-	-	-	-	-	-	-	-	-	-	-	-	-	-
1973	3	13	-	2	4	-	-	-	-	-	-	-	-	-	-	-	-	-	-	-	-	-	-	-	-	-	-	-	-	-	-	-	-	-	-	-	-
1974	10	8	-	2	1	-	-	-	-	-	-	-	-	-	-	2	-	-	-	-	-	-	-	-	-	-	-	-	-	-	-	-	-	-	-	-	-
1975	10	4	6	-	1	-	-	-	-	-	-	1	-	-	-	-	-	-	-	-	-	-	-	-	-	-	-	-	-	-	-	-	-	-	-	-	-
1976	3	6	-	-	5	5	-	-	-	-	-	-	-	-	-	1	-	-	-	-	-	-	1	-	-	-	-	-	-	-	-	-	-	-	-	-	-
1977	4	14	1	-	2	-	-	-	-	-	-	-	-	-	-	-	-	-	-	-	-	-	-	-	-	-	-	-	-	-	-	-	-	-	-	-	-
1978	6	6	1	5	3	-	-	-	-	-	-	-	-	-	-	-	-	-	-	-	-	-	-	-	-	-	-	-	-	-	-	-	-	-	-	-	-
1979	6	10	-	1	4	-	-	-	-	2	-	-	-	-	-	-	-	-	-	-	-	-	-	-	-	-	-	-	-	-	-	-	-	-	-	-	-
1980	7	1	3	1	1	2	-	-	-	5	-	-	-	-	-	-	-	-	-	-	-	-	-	-	-	-	-	-	-	-	-	1	-	-	-	-	-
1981	12	-	4	3	2	-	-	-	-	-	1	-	-	-	-	-	-	-	-	-	-	-	-	-	-	-	-	-	-	-	-	-	-	-	-	-	-
1982	11	8	-	2	-	-	-	-	-	-	-	-	-	-	-	-	-	-	-	-	-	-	-	-	-	-	-	-	-	-	-	-	1	-	-	-	-
1983	9	3	3	5	-	-	-	-	-	-	-	1	-	-	-	-	-	-	-	-	-	-	-	-	-	-	-	-	-	-	-	-	-	-	-	-	-
1984	5	10	4	1	-	1	-	-	-	-	-	-	-	-	-	-	-	-	-	-	-	-	-	-	-	-	-	-	-	-	-	-	-	-	-	-	-
1985	8	3	1	-	1	-	3	-	-	3	-	-	-	-	-	-	-	-	-	-	1	-	-	-	-	-	-	-	-		-	-	-	-	-	-	-
1986	9	2	-	6	-	1	-	1	-	2	-	-	-	-	-	-	-	-	-	-	1	-	-	-	-	-	-	-	-	-	-	-	-	-	-	-	-
1987	11	1	3	2	-	-	4	-	-	2	-	-	-	-	-	-	-	-	-	-	-	-	-	-	-	-	-	-	-	-	-	-	-	-	-	-	-
1988	8	-	1	-	6	-	1	2	-	2	1	-	-	-	-	-	-	-	-	-	-	-	-	-	-	-	-	-	-	-	-	-	-	-	-	-	-
1989	7	3	3	-	4	2	1	2	-	-	-	-	-	-	-	-	-	-	-	-	1	-	-	-	-	-	-	-	-	-	-	-	-	-	-	-	-
1990	6	2	1	3	1	1	3	-	-	-	1	-	-	-	-	-	-	-	-	1	1	-	-	-	-	3	-	-	-	-	-	-	-	-	-	-	-
1991	8	-	2	-	5	1	2	-	-	-	2	-	-	-	-	-	-	-	-	-	1	-	-	-	-	-	-	-	-	-	-	-	-	-	-	-	-
1992	5	3	2	-	5	-	1	-	2	-	-	-	-	-	-	-	-	4	-	-	-	-	-	-	-	-	-	-	-	-	-	-	-	-	-	-	-
1993	5	-	-	2	2	-	1	-	6	-	-	-	-	-	-	-	-	3	-	1	-	-	-	-	-	-	-	-	-	-	1	-	-	-	-	-	-
1994	1	-	4	7	2	-	1	-	6	-	-	-	-	-	-	-	-	-	-	-	-	-	-	-	-	-	-	-	-	-	-	-	-	-	-	-	-
1995	3	-	5	5	1	5	-	-	1	-	1	-	-	-	1	-	-	-	-	-	-	-	-	-	-	-	-	-	-	-	-	-	-	-	-	-	-
1996	-	2	11	2	1	-	1	-	4	-	-	-	-	-	1	-	-	-	-	-	-	-	-	-	-	-	-	-	-	-	-	-	-	-	-	-	-
1997	5	-	1	3	3	3	-	-	1	-	1	-	-	-	2	-	-	-	3	-	-	-	-	-	-	-	-	-	-	-	-	-	-	-	-	-	-
1998	6	-	5	-	2	2	-	-	3	-	-	-	-	-	3	-	-	-	-	-	-	-	-	-	-	-	-	1	-	-	-	-	-	-	-	-	-
1999	5	2	3	1	1	6	-	-	1	-	-	-	-	-	1	-	-	-	-	-	-	-	-	-	-	-	-	-	1	-	1	-	-	-	-	-	-
2000	9	-	7	-	1	-	1	-	1	-	-	-	-	-	1	-	1	-	-	-	-	-	-	-	-	-	-	-	-	-	-	-	-	-	-	-	-
2001	7	-	2	-	-	3	2	2	1	-	1	-	-	1	-	-	-	-	1	-	-	-	-	-	-	-	-	-	1	-	-	-	-	-	-	-	-
2002	10	-	9	-	-	-	1	-	-	-	-	-	-	-	1	-	-	-	-	-	-	-	-	-	-	-	-	-	-	-	-	-	-	-	-	-	-
2003	9	-	6	-	-	2	1	1	-	-	1	-	-	-	-	-	-	-	-	-	-	-	-	-	-	-	-	-	-	-	-	-	-	-	1	-	-
2004	11	-	5	-	-	-	1	-	-	-	-	-	-	1	1	-	-	-	-	-	-	-	-	-	-	-	-	-	-	-	-	-	-	-	-	-	-
2005	6	-	3	-	1	1	-	-	-	-	1	-	-	-	2	-	-	-	-	1	-	-	-	-	-	-	-	-	-	-	-	-	-	-	-	-	-
2006	6	-	3	-	-	3	-	1	-	-	1	-	-	-	-	1	4	-	-	1	-	-	-	-	-	-	-	-	-	-	-	-	-	-	-	-	-
2007	7	-	7	-	-	2	1	-	-	-	-	-	-	1	2	-	-	-	-	-	-	-	-	-	-	-	-	-	-	-	-	-	-	-	-	-	-
2008	7	4	5	2	-	-	-	-	-	-	1	-	-	2	-	-	-	-	-	-	-	-	-	-	-	-	-	-	-	-	-	-	-	-	-	-	-
2009	1	-	2	2	1	5	-	1	2	1	-	1	1	1	-	-	-	-	-	-	-	-	-	-	1	-	-	-	-	-	-	1	-	-	-	-	-
2010	7	2	2	1	-	-	-	3	-	-	-	-	-	3	-	-	-	-	-	1	-	1	-	-	-	-	-	-	-	-	-	-	-	1	-	-	-
2011	5	-	2	1	1	2	-	1	1	1	-	1	-	-	-	-	-	-	-	-	-	3	1	-	-	-	-	1	-	-	-	-	-	-	-	1	-
2012	8	2	1	-	-	5	-	1	-	-	-	1	-	-	1	-	-	-	-	-	-	-	-	-	-	-	-	-	-	-	-	-	1	-	-	-	-
2013	3	1	1	4	1	-	-	-	1	1	1	2	-	2	-	-	1	-	2	-	-	-	-	-	-	-	-	-	-	-	-	-	-	1	-	-	-
2014	5	-	4	2	-	5	1	-	-	-	-	2	-	-	-	-	-	-	-	-	-	-	-	1	1	-	-	-	-	-	-	-	-	-	-	-	-
2015	4	1	2	1	4	1	2	-	-	1	-	1	-	1	-	1	-	-	-	-	-	1	1	-	-	-	-	-	-	-	-	-	-	-	-	-	-
2016	1	4	2	3	1	-	1	4	1	-	2	-	-	-	1	-	-	-	-	-	-	-	1	-	-		-	-	-		-	-	-	-	-	-	-
2017	1	3	5	1	-	-	2	2	-	-	-	-	1	1	-	-	1	-	-	-	-	-	-	3	-	-	1	-	-	-	-	-	-	-	-	-	-
2018	4	1	4	5	-	-	-	1	-	-	-	3	-	2	-	-	-	-	-	-	-	-	-	-	1	-	-	-	-	-	-	-	-	-	-	-	-
2019	4	2	-	1	2	1	2	-	-	2	1	-	4	1	-	-	1	-	-	-	-	-	-	-	-	-	-	-	-	-	-	-	-	-	-	-	-
2020	2	3	-	2	-	2	-	1	-	2	1	-	4	-	-	-	-	-	-	-	-	-	-	-	1	-	-	-	-	-	-	-	-	-	-	-	-
2021	-	2	1	3	3	-	1	-	-	-	3	2	4	-	-	-	-	-	-	-	-	-	-	1	-	-	-	1	-	-	-	-	-	-	-	-	-
2022	2	2	-	-	2	-	2	-	-	2	3	3	1	-	-	-	-	-	-	-	-	-	-	-	-	-	-	-	1	3	-	-	-	-	-	-	-
2023	1	3	2	1	2	1	1	-	-	-	3	3	2	1	-	1	-	-	-	-	-	-	-	-	-	-	-	-	-	-	-	-	-	-	-	-	-
2024	4	3	-	-	-	-	-	1	1	2	-	4	3	1	-	-	-	-	1	-	-	-	-	-	1	-	-	-	-	-	-	-	-	-	-	-	-
2025	3	3	2	1	-	-	1	1	-	-	4	2	-	-	-	1	-	-	-	-	-	-	-	-	-	-	-	-	-	-	-	-	-	-	-	-	1
2026	2	2	-	2	-	1	-	5	1	1	-	-	4	-	-	-	-	-	-	2	-	-	-	-	-	-	-	-	-	-	-	-	-	-	-	-	-
TOTAL	568	241	192	131	119	71	38	38	34	31	30	27	24	18	17	12	8	7	7	7	5	5	5	5	5	3	3	3	3	3	2	2	2	2	1	1	1
	(Spain)	(Belgium)	(Italy)	(France)	(Netherlands)	(Germany)	(Colombia)	(United Kingdom)	(Switzerland)	(Republic of Ireland)	(Denmark)	(Australia)	(Slovenia)	(United States)	(Russia)	(Portugal)	(Kazakhstan)	(Uzbekistan)	(Czech Republic)	(Norway)	(Soviet Union)	(Slovakia)	(Luxembourg)	(Poland)	(Canada)	(East Germany)	(Austria)	(Estonia)	(South Africa)	(Ecuador)	(Ukraine)	(New Zealand)	(Sweden)	(Belarus)	(Venezuela)	(Argentina)	(United Arab Emirates)

== Leading all stages ==
=== Wearing red jersey from first to last stage ===
Year	Rider	Stages
1942	(Spain) Julián Berrendero	19
1977	(Belgium) Freddy Maertens	20
1994	(Switzerland) Tony Rominger	21

== Country visits ==
- Andorra - 24 times - 1965, 1967, 1985, 1987, 1988, 1991, 1994, 1998, 1999, 2000, 2001, 2005, 2007, 2008, 2010, 2012, 2013, 2015, 2017, 2018, 2019, 2023, 2025, 2026
- France - 14 times - 1955, 1956, 1957, 1962, 1965, 1992, 1995, 2013, 2016, 2017*, 2019, 2023, 2025, 2026
- Portugal - 2 times - 1997*, 2024*
- Netherlands - 2 times - 2009*, 2022*
- Belgium - 2 times - 2009, 2022
- Germany - 1 time - 2009
- Italy - 1 time - 2025*
- Monaco - 1 time - 2026

== See also ==
- Yellow jersey statistics (for a list of leaders in the Tour de France)
- Pink jersey statistics (for a list of leaders in the Giro d'Italia)
- List of Vuelta a España winners
