= 1961 Vuelta a España =

Race details
- Dates: 26 April – 11 May
- Stages: 16
- Distance: 2,856.5 km (1,775 mi)
- Winning time: 77h 36' 17"

Results
| Jersey awarded to the overall winner | Winner | Angelino Soler (ESP) | (Faema) |
| | Second | François Mahé (FRA) | (Francia – Afcas) |
| | Third | José Pérez Francés (ESP) | (Ferrys) |
| Jersey awarded to the points classification winner | Points | Antonio Suárez (ESP) | (Faema) |
| | Mountains | Antonio Karmany (ESP) | (KAS – Royal Asport) |
| | Sprints | Vicente Iturat (ESP) | (Catigene) |

The 16th Vuelta a España (Tour of Spain), a long-distance bicycle stage race and one of the three grand tours, was held from 26 April to 11 May 1961. It consisted of 16 stages covering a total of 2,856.5 km (1,774.9 mi), and was won by Angelino Soler of the Faema cycling team. Antonio Suárez won the points classification and Antonio Karmany won the mountains classification.

== Route ==
List of stages
| Stage | Date | Course | Distance | Type | Winner |
|---|---|---|---|---|---|
| 1a | 26 April | San Sebastián to San Sebastián | 10.5 km (7 mi) | Team time trial | Faema |
| 1b | 26 April | San Sebastián to Pamplona | 91 km (57 mi) | | Marcel Rohrbach (FRA) |
| 2 | 27 April | Pamplona to Pamplona | 174 km (108 mi) | | François Mahé (FRA) |
| 3 | 28 April | Pamplona to Huesca | 174 km (108 mi) | | Vicente Iturat (ESP) |
| 4 | 29 April | Binéfar to Barcelona | 199 km (124 mi) | | Marcel Seynaeve (BEL) |
| 5 | 30 April | Barcelona to Tortosa | 185 km (115 mi) | | Jesús Galdeano (ESP) |
| 6 | 1 May | Tortosa to Valencia | 188 km (117 mi) | | Angelino Soler (ESP) |
| 7 | 2 May | Valencia to Benidorm | 141 km (88 mi) | | René Van Meenen (BEL) |
| 8 | 3 May | Benidorm to Albacete | 211 km (131 mi) | | José Pérez Francés (ESP) |
| 9 | 4 May | Albacete to Madrid | 198 km (123 mi) | | Alves Barbosa (POR) |
| 10 | 5 May | Madrid to Madrid | 195 km (121 mi) | | Luis Otaño (ESP) |
| 11 | 6 May | Madrid to Valladolid | 189 km (117 mi) | | Arthur Decabooter (BEL) |
| 12 | 7 May | Valladolid to Palencia | 48 km (30 mi) | Individual time trial | Antonio Suárez (ESP) |
| 13 | 8 May | Palencia to Santander | 220 km (137 mi) | | Francisco Moreno (ESP) |
| 14 | 9 May | Santander to Vitoria | 235 km (146 mi) | | François Mahé (FRA) |
| 15 | 10 May | Vitoria to Bilbao | 179 km (111 mi) | | Antonio Karmany (ESP) |
| 16 | 11 May | Bilbao to Bilbao | 159 km (99 mi) | | Gabriel Company (ESP) |
| | Total | | 2,856.5 km (1,775 mi) | | |

== Results ==
Final general classification
| Rank | Rider | Team | Time |
|---|---|---|---|
| 1 | (Spain) Angelino Soler | Faema | 77h 36' 17" |
| 2 | (France) François Mahé | Francia – Afcas | + 51" |
| 3 | (Spain) José Pérez Francés | Ferrys | + 2' 23" |
| 4 | (Spain) Antonio Suárez | Faema | + 2' 47" |
| 5 | (Spain) Antonio Gómez del Moral | Faema | + 3' 13" |
| 6 | (Spain) Vicente Iturat | Catigene | + 5' 29" |
| 7 | (Spain) Fernando Manzaneque | Licor 43 | + 5' 47" |
| 8 | (Spain) Antonio Karmany | Kas-Royal Sport | + 6' 07" |
| 9 | (Spain) Carmelo Morales | Licor 43 | + 7' 39" |
| 10 | (Spain) Jesús Loroño | Ferrys | + 7' 47" |
| 11 | (Belgium) Andre Messelis | Groene Leeuw | |
| 12 | (Spain) Miguel Pacheco Font | Licor 43 | |
| 13 | (Italy) Arturo Sabbadin | Philico | |
| 14 | (Spain) Salvador Botella | Faema | |
| 15 | (Spain) Juan Campillo | Kas-Royal Sport | |
| 16 | (Spain) Rene Marigil | Licor 43 | |
| 17 | (Belgium) Jan Adriaensens | Groene Leeuw | |
| 18 | (Portugal) Antonio Barbosa | | |
| 19 | (Belgium) Marcel Seynaeve | Groene Leeuw | |
| 20 | (Spain) Ángel Guardiola | Licor 43 | |
| 21 | (Spain) Luis Otaño | Licor 43 | |
| 22 | (Spain) Antonio Jiménez | Kas-Royal Sport | |
| 23 | (Netherlands) Jef Lahaye | Groene Leeuw | |
| 24 | (Portugal) Jose Sousa Cardoso | | |
| 25 | (Spain) Jesús Galdeano | Faema | |
