= Francisco Martin =

Francisco Martin may refer to:

- Francisco Martín (born 1955), Spanish athlete
- Francisco Martin (born 2001), American Idol third place contestant on the eighteenth season
- Francisco Jesús Martín Milán, Spanish historian, writer and teacher
- Francisco Martín Borque (1917–1998), Mexican entrepreneur
- Francisco Martín Moreno (born 1946), Mexican writer
- Francisco Martín Cordovés (1585–1676), Spanish architect
- Paco Jémez (Francisco Jémez Martín, born 1970), Spanish retired footballer
