= Circuito Montañés =

Cycling race

Race details
- Date: Mid June
- Region: Cantabria, Spain
- Local name(s): Circuito Montañés (in Spanish)
- Discipline: Road
- Competition: UCI Europe Tour
- Type: Stage-race

History
- First edition: 1954
- First winner: Julio San Emeterio (ESP)
- Most wins: Carmelo Morales (ESP) (2 wins)
- Most recent: Fabio Duarte (COL)

Circuito Montañés is a road cycling stage race held annually in Cantabria, Spain. The editions 1986–1995 were reserved to amateurs. Since 2005, the race has been organized as a 2.2 event on the UCI Europe Tour.

== Winners ==
Year	Country	Rider	Team
1954	Spain	Julio San Emeterio	individual
1955	Spain	Gabriel Company	Calzada Gorilla
1956	Spain	Carmelo Morales	Gamma
1957	Spain	Benigno Azpuru	CIL Bicicletas-Indauchu
1958	Spain	Roberto Morales	Lube
1959	Spain	Jesús Galdeano	Faema-Guerra
1960	Spain	Manuel Martin Pinera	KAS-Boxing
1961	Spain	Carmelo Morales	Licor 43
1962	Spain	Emilio Cruz	Ferrys
1963	Spain	Eusebio Velez	KAS-Kaskol
1964– 1985	No race		
1986	Spain	Jesús Montoya	
1987	Spain	Javier Mauleón	
1988	Spain	Víctor Gonzalo	
1989	Spain	Fernando Piñero	
1990	Spain	José Luis de Santos	
1991	Lithuania	Arturas Kasputis	
1992	Spain	José María Jiménez	
1993	France	Thierry Elissalde	
1994	Colombia	José Castelblanco	
1995	France	Jean-Yves Duzellier	
1996	Spain	Javier Otxoa	
1997	Belgium	Kurt Van De Wouwer	Vlaanderen 2002
1998	Russia	Alexei Sivakov	BigMat-Auber '93
1999	Spain	David Vázquez	Burgos Monumental
2000	Belgium	Dave Bruylandts	Palmans-Ideal
2001	Spain	Rafael Mila	Cropusa
2002	Spain	Óscar Serrano	ASC-Vila do Conde
2003	Belgium	Steven Kleynen	Vlaanderen-T Interim
2004	Spain	Fernando Serrano	Avila Rojas-Marb
2005	Spain	Sergio Domínguez	Spiuk
2006	Netherlands	Robert Gesink	Rabobank Continental Team
2007	Netherlands	Bauke Mollema	Rabobank Continental Team
2008	Russia	Alexey Shchebelin	Cinelli OPD
2009	United States	Tejay Van Garderen	Rabobank Continental Team
2010	Colombia	Fabio Duarte	Café de Colombia-Colombia es Pasion
