= Francisco Moreno (disambiguation) =

Francisco Moreno (el perito Moreno, 1852–1919) was an Argentine explorer and academic.

Francisco Moreno may also refer to:

- Francisco Moreno Zuleta (1880–1963), Spanish nobleman and politician
- Francisco Moreno Capdevila (1926–1995), Mexican artist
- Francisco Moreno Martínez (1931–2018), Spanish racing cyclist
- Francisco Martín Moreno (born 1946), Mexican writer and journalist
- Francisco Manuel Moreno (1950–2024), Mexican prelate of the Anglican church, primate of Mexico
- Francisco Moreno Barrón (1954–2025), Mexican prelate of the Roman Catholic church, archbishop of Tijuana
- Francisco Moreno Fernández (admiral) (1883–1945), Spanish admiral
- Francisco Moreno Fernández (linguist) (born 1960), Spanish dialectologist and sociolinguist
- Francisco Moreno Merino (born 1966), Mexican politician
- Isko Moreno (Francisco Moreno Domagoso, born 1974), Filipino celebrity and politician
- Francisco Moreno Museum of Patagonia in Bariloche, Argentina
