= Francisco Martín Cordovés =

Spanish architect

Personal details
- Born: 1585 Tembleque, Toledo, Spain
- Died: 1676 (aged 90–91) Buenos Aires, Argentina
- Spouse: Francisca Rodriguez Varillas
- Occupation: Carpentry; Stonemasonry
- Profession: Architect

Francisco Martín Cordovés (1585–1676) was a Spanish architect. He served in Buenos Aires during the Viceroyalty of Peru.

== Biography ==
Martín Cordovés was born 1584 in Toledo, Spain. Had arrived at the port of Buenos Aires in the late of 16th century. In 1612, he was married to Francisca Rodriguez Varillas. descendant of Gonzalo Rodríguez, and Fernando Joanes de Monroy.

Cordovés exercised the profession of architect, master of stonemason, and appraiser in the Fort of Buenos Aires.

Francisco Martín Cordovés lived more than 90 years something atypical for the time.
