= 1960 Dwars door België =

Race details
- Dates: 26–27 March 1960
- Stages: 2
- Distance: 439 km (272.8 mi)
- Winning time: 10h 37' 30"

Results
	Winner	Arthur Decabooter (BEL)
	Second	Edgard Sorgeloos (BEL)
	Third	Julien Schepens (BEL)

The 1960 Dwars door België was the 16th edition of the Dwars door Vlaanderen cycle race and was held on 26–27 March 1960. The race started and finished in Waregem. The race was won by Arthur Decabooter.

== General classification ==
Final general classification

Rank	Rider	Time
1	Arthur Decabooter (BEL)	10h 37' 30"
2	Edgard Sorgeloos (BEL)	+ 17"
3	Julien Schepens (BEL)	+ 44"
4	Noël Foré (BEL)	+ 44"
5	Lode Troonbeeckx (BEL)	+ 44"
6	Frans De Mulder (BEL)	+ 44"
7	Marcel Seynaeve (BEL)	+ 44"
8	Karel Borgmans (BEL)	+ 44"
9	André Messelis (BEL)	+ 44"
10	Wout Wagtmans (NED)	+ 44"
