= Faema (cycling team, 1955–1962) =

Cycling team (1955–1962)

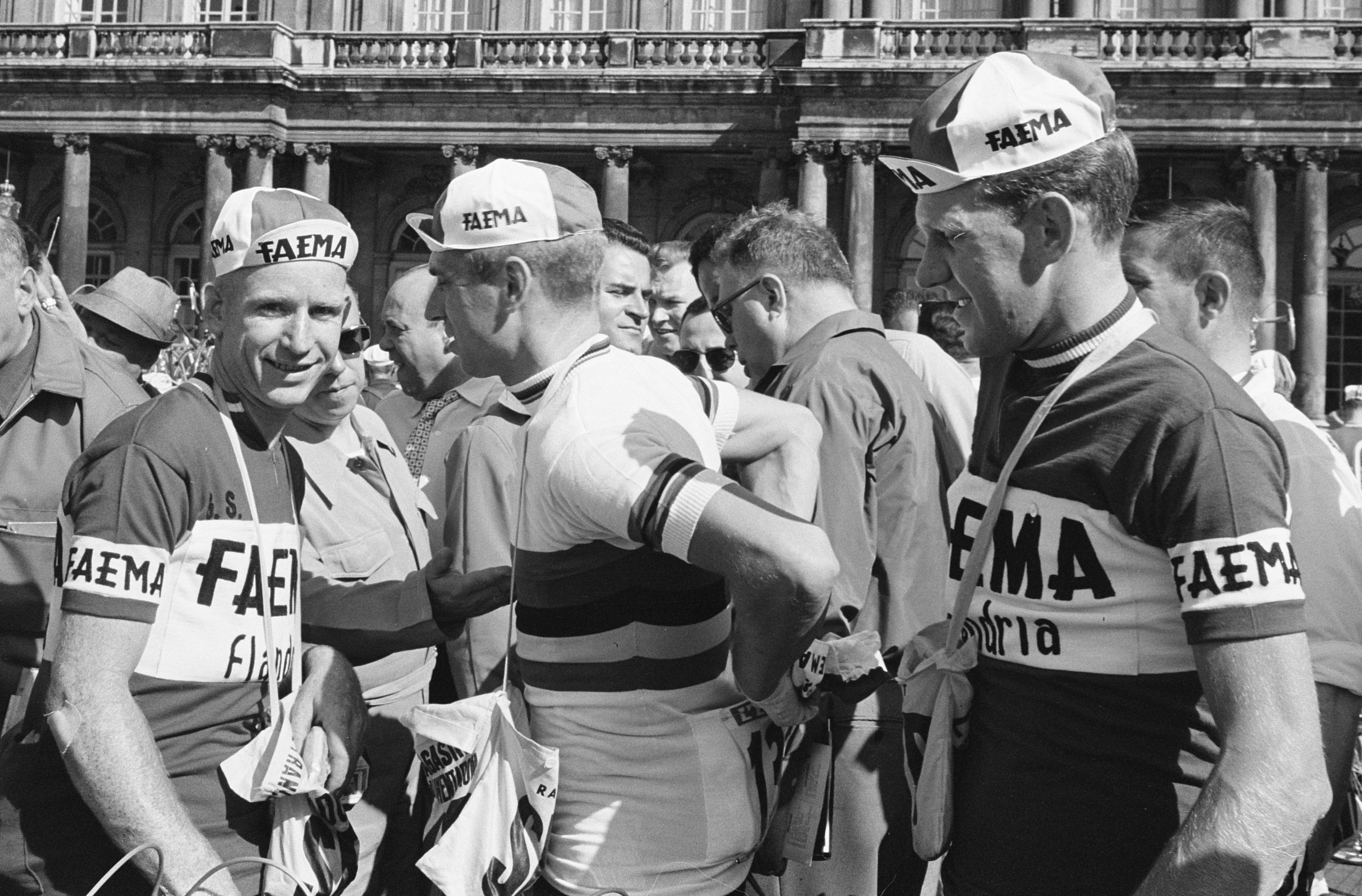
- Faema riders Piet van Est and Rik Van Looy and Huub Zilverberg at the 1962 Tour de France

Team information
- Registered: Italy (1955–1956); Belgium (1957–1961); Spain (1962)
- Founded: 1955
- Disbanded: 1962
- Discipline: Road

Team name history
- 1955–1959 1960–1961 1961 Giro 2nd team 1962: Faema–Guerra; Faema; EMI; Faema
Faema jersey
Jersey

Faema was a professional cycling team that existed from 1955 to 1962. The team's main sponsor was espresso machine manufacturer Faema. In 1963, the Faema and Flandria teams were merged.

In 1964, Faema disappeared as a sponsor in the peloton, but they returned four years later as Faemino–Faema with great success, notably through Eddy Merckx (from 1968 to 1970).

== Major results ==
=== 1955 – Faema–Guerra ===
- Vuelta a Andalucía Stage 1, Miguel Poblet
- G.P. de la Bicicleta Eibarresa, Stage 1, Miguel Poblet
- Giro di Sicilia Stage 1, Renzo Accordi
- Tour of the Netherlands Stage 3, Ilvo Pugi
- Grand Prix du Midi Libre, Miguel Poblet
- Tour de Suisse Stage 1, Fritz Schär
- Tour de France Stage 1a & 22, Miguel Poblet

=== 1956 – Faema–Guerra–Van Hauwaert ===
- Vuelta a Levante, Vicente Iturat
- Paris–Nice Stage 2 & 3, Germain Derycke
- Gent–Wevelgem, Rik Van Looy
- Driedaagse van Antwerpen, Overall Rik Van Looy

Stage 1 Willy Vannitsen
Stage 2a Rik Van Looy
Stage 2b T.T.T.

- G.P. de la Bicicleta Eibarresa,

Stage 4, Salvador Botella
Stage 6, Jesús Galdeano

- Paris–Brussels, Rik Van Looy
- Vuelta a España

Stage 3, 5 & 6, Miguel Poblet

- Meisterschaft von Zürich, Carlo Clerici
- Tour de Romandie Stage 2, René Strehler
- G.P. Bali, Overall & Stage 1, Briek Schotte
- Giro d'Italia, Overall, Charly Gaul

Stage 4, 8, 15 & 17, Miguel Poblet
Stage 7, 14 & 19, Charly Gaul

Tour de Suisse

Stage 1, 3 & 8, René Strehler
Stage 7, Fritz Schär

- Tour de Luxembourg

Stage 2, Charly Gaul
Stage 3, Willy Kemp

- Scheldeprijs, Rik Van Looy
- Tour of the Netherlands, Overall Rik Van Looy

Stage 2, Willy Vannitsen
Stage 3 & 6, Rik Van Looy
Stage 5, Roger Verplaetse

- Volta Ciclista a Catalunya

Stage 2, 5, 6b, 8 & 9, Miguel Poblet
Stage 5, Vicente Iturat

=== 1957 – Faema–Guerra ===
- Vuelta a Andalucia

Stage 1, Miguel Bover
Stage 5, Andrés Trobat
Stage 8, Gabriel Company

- Kuurne–Brussels–Kuurne, Jozef Verhelst
- Vuelta a Levante, Overall Bernardo Ruiz

Stage 3b & 5, Salvador Botella
Stage 4, Jesús Galdeano

- Gent–Wevelgem, Rik Van Looy
- Omloop Het Volk, Norbert Kerckhove
- Giro di Sicilia, Overall & Stage 1, Alberto Emiliozzi

Stage 3, Silvano Ciampi

- Paris–Roubaix, Leon Vandaele
- Gran Premio Ciclomotoristico delle Nazioni

Stage 2b, Alberto Emiliozzi
Stage 6a, Rik Van Looy

- Liège–Bastogne–Liège, Germain Derycke
- Tour of the Netherlands, Overall Rik Van Looy

Stage 1, Roger Decock
Stage 2 & 3b, Rik Van Looy
Stage 5, Leon Vandaele

Tour de Luxembourg Stage 2b, Charly Gaul
- Giro del Piemonte, Silvano Ciampi
- Giro d'Italia Stage 2 & 19 Charly Gaul
- Tour de Suisse Stage 6, Rolf Graf
- Scheldeprijs, Rik Van Looy
- Tre Valli Varesine, Germain Derijcke
- Driedaagse van Antwerpen, Overall & Stage 1 Leon van Daele

Stage 3a & 3b, Rik Van Looy

- Volta Ciclista a Catalunya

Stage 2, Willy Schroeders
Stage 3a, Jos Hoevenaers
Stage 5, Gabriel Company
Stage 6, Salvador Botella
Stage 7, Santiago Mostajo Gutiérrez

- Coppa Bernocchi, Rik Van Looy
- Trofeo Matteotti, Silvano Ciampi

=== 1958 – Faema–Guerra–Clément ===
- Vuelta a Andalucía Stage 1, Gabriel Company
- Kuurne–Brussels–Kuurne, Gilbert Desmet
- Vuelta a Levante, Overall Bernardo Ruiz

Stage 1, 4 & 8, Rik Van Looy
Stage 2, Roger Verplaetse
Stage 5a, Miguel Bover
Stage 5b & 6, Leon van Daele
Stage 7, Jozef Schils

- Milan–San Remo, Rik Van Looy
- Dwars door België Stage 2, Rik Van Looy
- Driedaagse van Antwerpen

Stage 2a, Rik Van Looy
Stage 3, Jozef Schils

- Paris–Roubaix, Leon van Daele
- Paris–Brussels, Rik Van Looy
- G.P. de la Bicicleta Eibarresa, Overall & Stage 3 Jesús Loroño
- Vuelta a España

Stage 1, Miguel Pacheco
Stage 2, Antonio Jiménez Quiles
Stage 4, 5b, 6, 9 & 10, Rik Van Looy
Stage 7, Gilbert Desmet
Stage 13a, Jesús Loroño
Stage 15 & 16, Rik Luyten

Gran Premio Ciclomotoristico delle Nazioni, Overall Jos Hoevenaers

Stage 4, Armando Pellegrini

- G.P. Bali Stage 3, Charly Gaul
- Giro d'Italia

Stage 3, Salvador Botella
Stage 4, Federico Bahamontes
Stage 6, Silvano Ciampi
Stage 14, Charly Gaul

- Spanish National Time Trial Championships, Federico Bahamontes
- Tour de Luxembourg Stage 4, Marcel Ernzer
- Tour of the Netherlands Stage 5, Jos Schils
- Tour de France

Stage 8, 18, 21 & 23, Charly Gaul
Stage 14 & 20, Federico Bahamontes

- G.P. Marvan

Stage 4, Jos Schils
Stage 7, Rik Van Looy

- Volta a Catalunya Stage 2, Fernando Manzaneque
- Coppa Bernocchi, Rik Van Looy
- Paris–Tours, Gilbert Desmet

=== 1959 – Faema–Guerra ===
- Vuelta a Andalucía Overall, Miguel Pacheco

Stage 1, Anicet Utset

- Sassari–Cagliari, Edgard Sorgeloos
- Vuelta a Levante, Overall Rik Van Looy

Stage 1b & 5, Jos Schils
Stage 1a, T.T.T.
Stage 2, 6 & 7, Rik Van Looy
Stage 3, Frans van Looveren
Stage 4, Hilaire Couvreur

- Tour of Flanders, Rik Van Looy
- G.P. de la Bicicleta Eibarresa, Stage 1, Antonio Bertrán

Stage 1, Francisco Moreno Martínez
Stage 3, T.T.T.

Vuelta a España

Stage 1b, 8, 9 & 11, Rik Van Looy
Stage 6, Gabriel Mas

- La Flèche Wallonne, Jos Hoevenaers
- Giro d'Italia

Stage 1, 5, 11 & 14, Rik Van Looy

- Tour de Suisse Overall & Stage 2, Hans Junkermann
- German National Road Race Championships,, Hans Junkermann
- G.P. Veith, Friedhelm Fischerkeller
- Volta Ciclista a Catalunya Overall, Salvador Botella
- Paris–Tours, Rik Van Looy
- Giro di Lombardia, Rik Van Looy

=== 1960 – Faema ===
- Vuelta a Andalucia Overall, Gabriel Mas

Stage 1, Antonio Bertrán
Stage 5 & 7, Fernando Manzaneque
Stage 6, Gabriel Company

- Vuelta a Levante Overall, Fernando Manzaneque

Stage 1, T.T.T.
Stage 2, Francisco Moreno Martínez
Stage 4b, Angelino Soler
Stage 5, Antonio Bertrán
Stage 7, Fernando Manzaneque
Stage 8, Salvador Botella

- Paris–Nice Overall, Raymond Impanis

Stage 2, T.T.T.
Stage 5 & 8b, Rik Van Looy

- Dwars door België

Stage 1, Edgard Sorgeloos
Stage 2, Norbert Kerckhove

- Madrid-Barcelona Overall, Antonio Suárez

Stage 1, Antonio Suárez
Stage 2, Jesús Galdeano
Stage 4, Salvador Botella

G.P. de la Bicicleta Eibarresa

Stage 1, Jesús Loroño
Stage 1, Antonio Suárez

- Vuelta a España

Stage 1, T.T.T.
Stage 9, Salvador Botella
Stage 12, Jesús Galdeano
Stage 13, Federico Bahamontes
Stage 12, Antonio Suárez

- Giro d'Italia

Stage 4, Salvador Botella
Stage 7b, 8 & 11, Rik Van Looy

- Spanish National Road Race Championships,, Antonio Suárez
- Tour de France Stage 18, Fernando Manzaneque
- UCI Road World Championships Rik Van Looy

=== 1961 – Faema ===
- Vuelta a Andalucía Overall, Angelino Soler

Stage 2, Antonio Gómez del Moral
Stage 3, Salvador Rosa Gómez
Stage 6 & 8, Salvador Botella

- Paris–Nice

Stage 1, Gilbert Desmet
Stage 6b & 7, Rik Van Looy

- Madrid-Barcelona Overall, Angelino Soler

Stage 5, Salvador Botella
Stage 6b, Antonio Suárez

- Paris–Roubaix, Rik Van Looy
- Vuelta a España Overall Angelino Soler

Stage 1a, T.T.T.
Stage 5, Jesús Galdeano
Stage 6, Angelino Soler
Stage 12, Antonio Suárez
Stage 13, Francisco Moreno Martínez

Deutschland Tour Stage 5, Louis Proost
- Liège–Bastogne–Liège, Rik Van Looy
- Tour of the Netherlands

Stage 2, Roger Baens
Stage 6 & 7, Peter Post

- Giro d'Italia

Stage 3 & 19, Miguel Poblet
Stage 5, Louis Proost
Stage 7, Antonio Suárez
Stage 8, Piet van Est
Stage 13, 15 & 17, Rik Van Looy

- Spanish National Road Race Championships,, Antonio Suárez
- UCI Road World Championships Rik Van Looy
- Volta Ciclista a Catalunya

Stage 2b, Antonio Suárez
Stage 6a, José Martín Colmenarejo

=== 1962 – Faema ===
- Vuelta a España Stage 9, Antonio Gómez del Moral
- Critérium du Dauphiné Libéré Stage 4, Julio Jiménez
- Tour de l'Avenir Overall & Stage 1, Antonio Gómez del Moral

Stage 5, Julio Jiménez
Stage 6, Juan Sánchez

=== 1963 – Faema–Flandria ===
- Vuelta a Andalucia Stage 2, Francisco Tortellá
- Kuurne–Brussels–Kuurne, Noël Foré
- Harelbeke–Antwerp–Harelbeke, Noël Foré
- Tour of Flanders, Noël Foré
- Dwars door België, Clément Roman
- Vuelta a España Stage 2, José Segú
- Tour de Romandie, Willy Bocklant
- Four Days of Dunkirk, Overall & Stage 5b, Joseph Planckaert
- Grand Prix Stan Ockers, Willy Bocklant
- Grand Prix du Midi Libre, Stage 2, José Segú
- Critérium du Dauphiné Libéré Stage 6b, Frans Brands
- Tour de Suisse Stage 3a, José Martín Colmenarejo
- Tour de France Stage 18, Frans Brands
- Tour de l'Avenir Stage 10, Ginés García Perán
- Scheldeprijs, Piet Oellibrandt
- Volta Ciclista a Catalunya Stage 2, Frans Brands
