= Fernando Joanes de Monroy =

12th-century Spanish nobleman

Personal details
- Born: 12th century Spain
- Died: 12th century Galicia, Spain

Fernando Joanes de Monroy, 12th century Lord of Allariz, was a Spanish nobleman. He was an important knight at the court of King Alfonso VII of León and Castile.

He was married to Núñez de Guzmán, daughter of the Count Gómez Nuñez de Guzmán Maldonado and Elvira Pérez. A son, Pedro Fernandez de Monroy was founder of the house Monroy. His grandson Fernán Pérez de Monroy, known as Gallego for having married a lady of Galicia, Elvira Nunez de Andrade, daughter of an illustrious family of ancestors Goths.
