= Francisco Jesús Martín Milán =

Spanish historian, writer and teacher

- Born: Berja, Almería
- Occupation: Historian and teacher

Francisco Jesús Martín Milán is a Spanish historian, writer and teacher. In 2011 he got a bachelor's degree in Humanities for Universidad de Almería.

In 2012 he published La población de Berja en el siglo XX. The presentation of the book was assisted with more than one hundred people. In 2016 he published Madre anoche en las trincheras, about the history of the two brothers Corral Martínez in Serón during the Spanish Civil War.

In 2018 he became a candidate of the Final Nacional de Acción Magistral 2018 for his coordination of the "VII ENCUENTRO DE TESTIMONIOS: Los niños de la guerra de España". In 2019 he worked with Sonia Cervantes and they published La guerra en mis ojos. Los cuatro exilios de Ana, about Ana Pomares, who survived to la Desbandá. In November 2022 he wrote Me verás cruzar el Ebro, which is about Nicolás López López (1917-2020), soldier who fought with the Spanish Republican Army during the Spanish Civil War and took part in the Battle of Ebro.

== Works ==
- La población de Berja en el siglo XX
- Madre anoche en las trincheras
- Berja. Segunda República, Guerra Civil y Represión franquista (1931–1936)
- La guerra en mis ojos. Los cuatro exilios de Ana (2019)
