= Gonzalo Rodríguez de las Varillas =

Personal details
- Born: 1270 Ciudad Rodrigo, Spain
- Died: 1345 (aged 74–75) Salamanca, Spain

Gonzalo Rodríguez de las Varillas (1270–1345) was a Spanish nobleman, founder of the Chapel San Juan Bautista, Parish of Santo Tomé.

== Biography ==
Born 1270 in Ciudad Rodrigo, Spain, was a descendant of conde Ramón de Tolosa, and by paternal line were direct descendants of conde Vela of Aragon, (son of king Sancho Ramírez).

Gonzalo Rodríguez de las Varillas was married to Teresa Martinez Nieto, daughter of Martin Fernan Nieto, Camarero Mayor of Pedro de Castilla (Infante). His second wife was Ines Rodríguez (his cousin) belonging to one of the most illustrious families of Aragon.
