= Arturo Sabbadin =

Italian cyclist

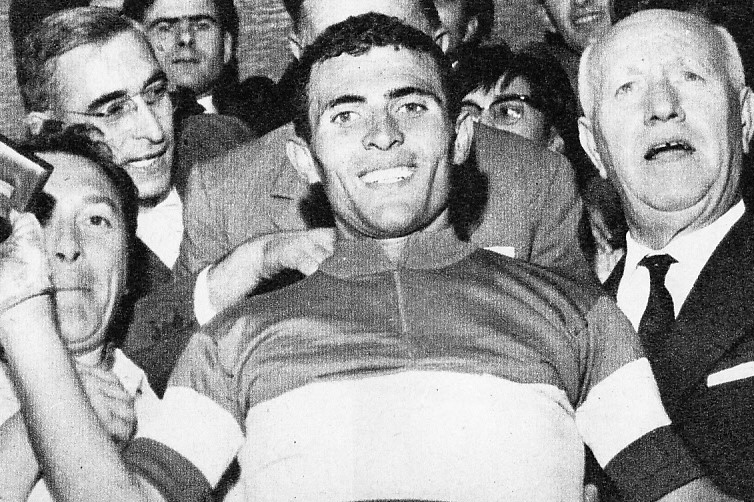
- Sabbadin in 1961

Personal information
- Born: 11 August 1939 (age 87) Mirano, Italy

Cycling career
- Sport: Cycling
- Current team: Retired
- Discipline: Road
- Role: Rider

Professional teams
- 1960–1961: Philco
- 1962: Gazzola–Fiorelli–Hutchinson
- 1963–1964: Springoil–Fuchs

Arturo Sabbadin (born 11 August 1939) is an Italian former road cyclist.

== Career achievements ==
=== Major results ===
1959
1st Giro del Mendrisiotto
1961
1st Road race, National Road Championships

=== Grand Tour general classification results timeline ===
Grand Tour	1961	1962	1963
Giro d'Italia	—	—	40
Tour de France	—	73	—
Vuelta a España	13	—	—
