= Francisco Martín Moreno =

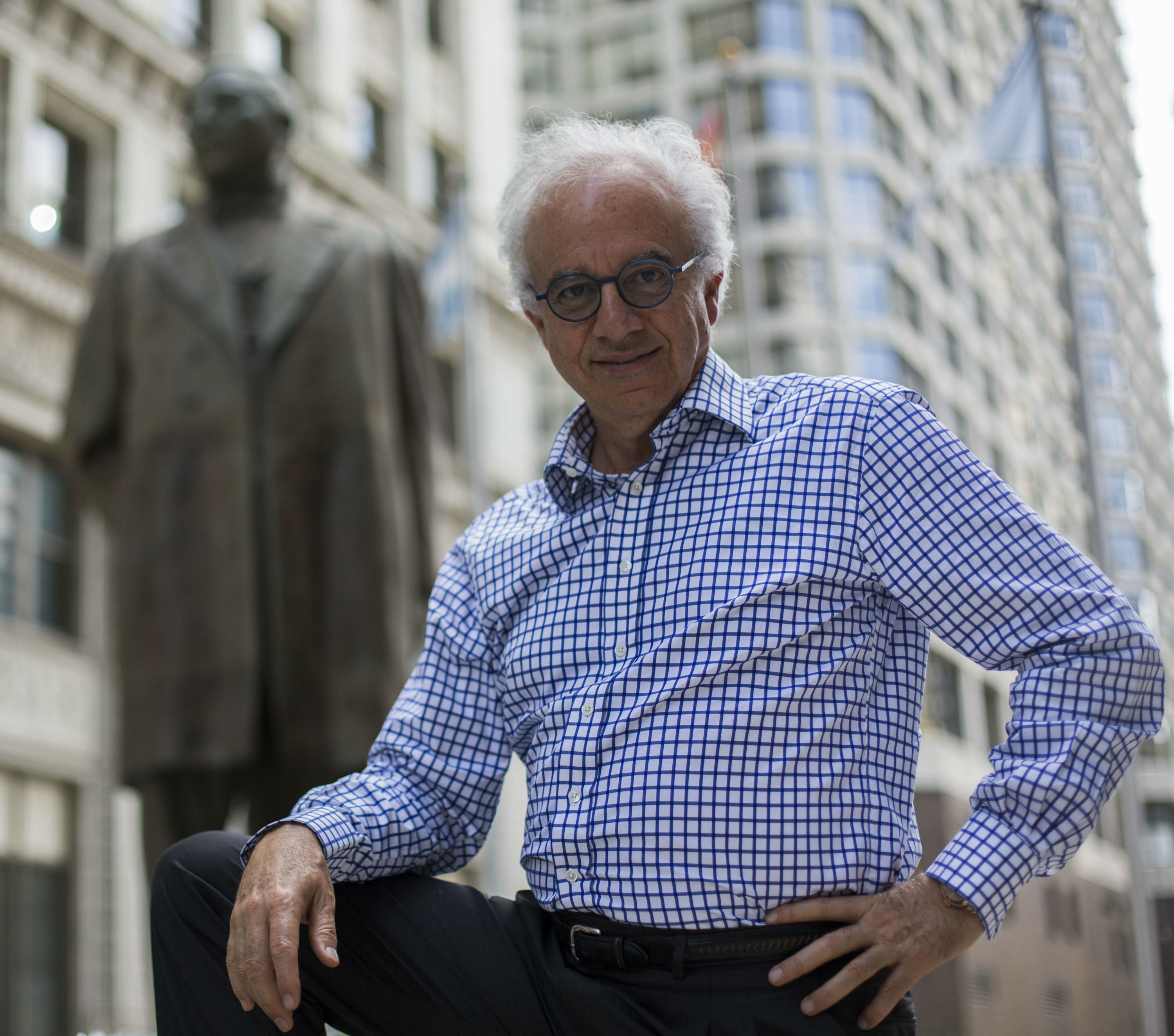
Francisco Martín Moreno

Francisco Martín Moreno (born 4 April 1946) is a Mexican writer, best seller novelist, journalist and public speaker.

He studied at the German School Alexander von Humboldt, received a BS in law, and obtained a PhD from the Mexican Academy of Law.

As a writer, he has published over 2,000 columns in various newspapers and magazines. He has worked for the newspapers Novedades, Excélsior, El País and magazines like Milenio and Cambio.

In different interviews in several media, he identifies as an investigator, but not as an historian, he considers himself liberal and laicist. The writer has become specialised in Mexican Historical Novel, focusing in political, social and religious topics, often merging fictional episodes within his books.

Some of his recognitions include: The Spanish Golden Laurel for the Literary Excellence which he won with his publication "The Scars of the wind," the National Journalism Prize in 1994, 1995, 1996, 1997 and 1998 in Mexico. The article "Brother: I need to kill you" was published fifteen days before the murder of the presidential candidate Luis Donaldo Colosio.

== Works ==
- Black Mexico (1986)
- The Scars of the wind (1989)
- The Apology (1993)
- The Answer (1994)
- Mexicans on slippers (1995)
- Mexicans in backlighting (1996)
- Letters to a Mexican (1997)
- Thirsty Mexico (1998)
- Mexico's great betrayals (2001)
- Secret Mexico (2002)
- Mutilated Mexico (2004)
- Sebastián (2004)
- Mexico before God (2007)
- Pestered Mexico (2008)
- Arrebatos carnales (2009)
- Arrebatos carnales II (2010)
- 100 Myths of Mexican History (2010)
- 100 Myths of Mexican History 2 (2011)
- Arrebatos carnales III (2011)
- Mexico's shames (2014)
- In half an hour... death (2014)
- Fooled Mexico (2015)
- Thief of hopes (2019)
- The Collapse of Mexico (2019)
