= André Le Dissez =

French cyclist

Personal information
- Full name: André Le Dissez
- Born: 11 November 1929 Plougonven, France
- Died: 4 May 2018 (aged 88) Paris, France

Cycling career
- Sport: Cycling
- Discipline: Road
- Role: Rider

Major wins
- 1 stage 1959 Tour de France

André Le Dissez (11 November 1929 – 4 May 2018) was a French professional road bicycle racer.

== Major results ==
1957
Méry
1958
Saint-Renan
Treignac
1959
Tour de France:

Winner stage 14

1961
Plevez
1964
Polymultipliée
Sévignac
