= Antonio Suárez =

Spanish cyclist

Personal information
- Full name: Antonio Suárez Vázquez
- Born: 20 May 1932 Madrid, Spain
- Died: 6 January 1981 (aged 48) Madrid, Spain

Cycling career
- Sport: Cycling
- Discipline: Road
- Role: Rider

Professional teams
- 1957: Guardio de Franco
- 1958: Lube–NSU
- 1959: Licor 43
- 1960–1961: Faema
- 1962: Ghigi
- 1963: Flandria–Faema
- 1964: IBAC
- 1965: Tedi Montjuich

Major wins
- Grand Tours Vuelta a España General classification (1959) Mountains classification (1959) Points classification (1961) 5 individual stages (1995, 1959, 1960, 1961) Giro d'Italia 1 individual stage (1961) One-day races and Classics National Road Race Championships (1959–1961)

Antonio Suárez Vázquez (20 May 1932 – 6 January 1981) was a professional road racing cyclist from Spain between 1956 and 1965. He is most famous for winning the overall title and the mountains classification of the 1959 Vuelta a España. In addition, Suarez won the points classification at the 1961 Vuelta and a career total of five stages at the Vuelta.

Suárez also won a stage and finished on the podium in third place at the 1961 Giro d’Italia behind Arnaldo Pambianco of Italy and Jacques Anquetil of France.

== Major results ==
1956
2nd Overall Vuelta a Asturias

1st Stage 1

1957
1st Stage 16 Vuelta a España
1st Stages 1 & 8 Vuelta a Levante
1st Stage 1 Vuelta a La Rioja
3rd Overall Vuelta a Andalucía

1st Stage 7

1958
1st Stage 7 Vuelta a Andalucía
1st Stage 2 Circuito Montañés
3rd Overall Eibarko Bizikleta

1st Stage 5

1959
1st Overall Vuelta a España

1st Mountains classification
1st Stages 5 & 10

1st Road race, National Road Championships
1960
1st Road race, National Road Championships
1st Overall Barcelona–Madrid

1st Stage 1

1st Stage 14 Vuelta a España
1st Stage 3 Eibarko Bizikleta
1961
1st Road race, National Road Championships
3rd Overall Giro d'Italia

1st Stage 7

4th Overall Vuelta a España

1st Points classification
1st Stage 12 (ITT)

1962
2nd Giro della Provincia di Reggio Calabria
3rd Giro dell'Emilia
1963
2nd Trofeo Jaumendreu
6th Overall Vuelta a España
1964
3rd Clásica a los Puertos de Guadarrama
