= Manuel Martín Piñera =

Spanish cyclist (1931–2026)

Personal information
- Born: 3 June 1931 Cabezón de la Sal, Spain
- Died: 6 August 2026 (aged 95)

Cycling career
- Sport: Cycling
- Discipline: Road bicycle racing
- Role: Rider

Professional teams
- 1955–1956: Individual
- 1957: Boxing Club
- 1958–1967: Kas–Boxing
- 1968–1969: Karpy

Major wins
- Five stages Vuelta a España

Manuel Martín Piñera (3 June 1931 – 6 August 2026) was a Spanish professional cyclist. He most notably won five stages of the Vuelta a España, among many other professional wins.

== Background ==
Manuel Martín Piñera was born in Cabezón de la Sal, Cantabria on 3 June 1931. After retiring in 1970, a friend offered him a job at a company where he stayed until retirement.

Martín Piñera died on 6 August 2026, at the age of 95.

== Career ==
Martín was professional from 1955 to 1969, where he notably won five stages of the Vuelta a España. Height 1.72 m and weight in form 68–70 kg. He was considered a rouleur with great physical strength. He started his career late, at the age of 24 in the beginners category. After two successful seasons, he upgraded to an Independent, and two years later, in 1958, he signed with Kas–Boxing. In 1968, at 38 years old, Lagaríca signed with Karpy, and won two stages in the Vuelta España in which he was also a team leader. He retired after the following season.

== Major results ==
1958
1st Overall Vuelta a La Rioja

1st Stage 2

1960
1st Overall Circuito Montañés
1st GP Cuprosan
1961
1st Stage 12 Vuelta a Colombia
1962
2nd Overall Volta a Catalunya
3rd Road race, National Road Championships
1963
1st Circuito de Getxo
3rd Klasika Primavera
1964
1st GP Ayuntamiento de Bilbao
3rd Trofeo Jaumendreu
1965
1st Stages 6 & 18 Vuelta a España
1st Orense
1966
1st Trofeo Masferrer
2nd Overall Vuelta a los Valles Mineros
3rd Campeonato Vasco Navarro de Montaña
1968
1st Stages 8 & 18 Vuelta a España
1969
1st Stage 10 Vuelta a España

=== Grand Tour results ===
==== Tour de France ====
- 1963: DNF
- 1964: 52

==== Vuelta a España ====
- 1959: 35
- 1960: DNF
- 1961: 45
- 1962: 47
- 1963: 30
- 1965: 21
- 1966: 49
- 1968: 40
- 1969: 67

==== Giro d'Italia ====
- 1967: 50
