= José Carlos Sousa Cardoso =

Portuguese cyclist

Personal information
- Born: 10 January 1937 (age 89) Lavandeira, Portugal

Cycling career
- Sport: Cycling
- Role: Rider

José Carlos Sousa Cardoso (born 10 January 1937) is a Portuguese racing cyclist. He rode in the 1959 Tour de France, finishing in 46th place.
