= Huub Zilverberg =

Dutch cyclist

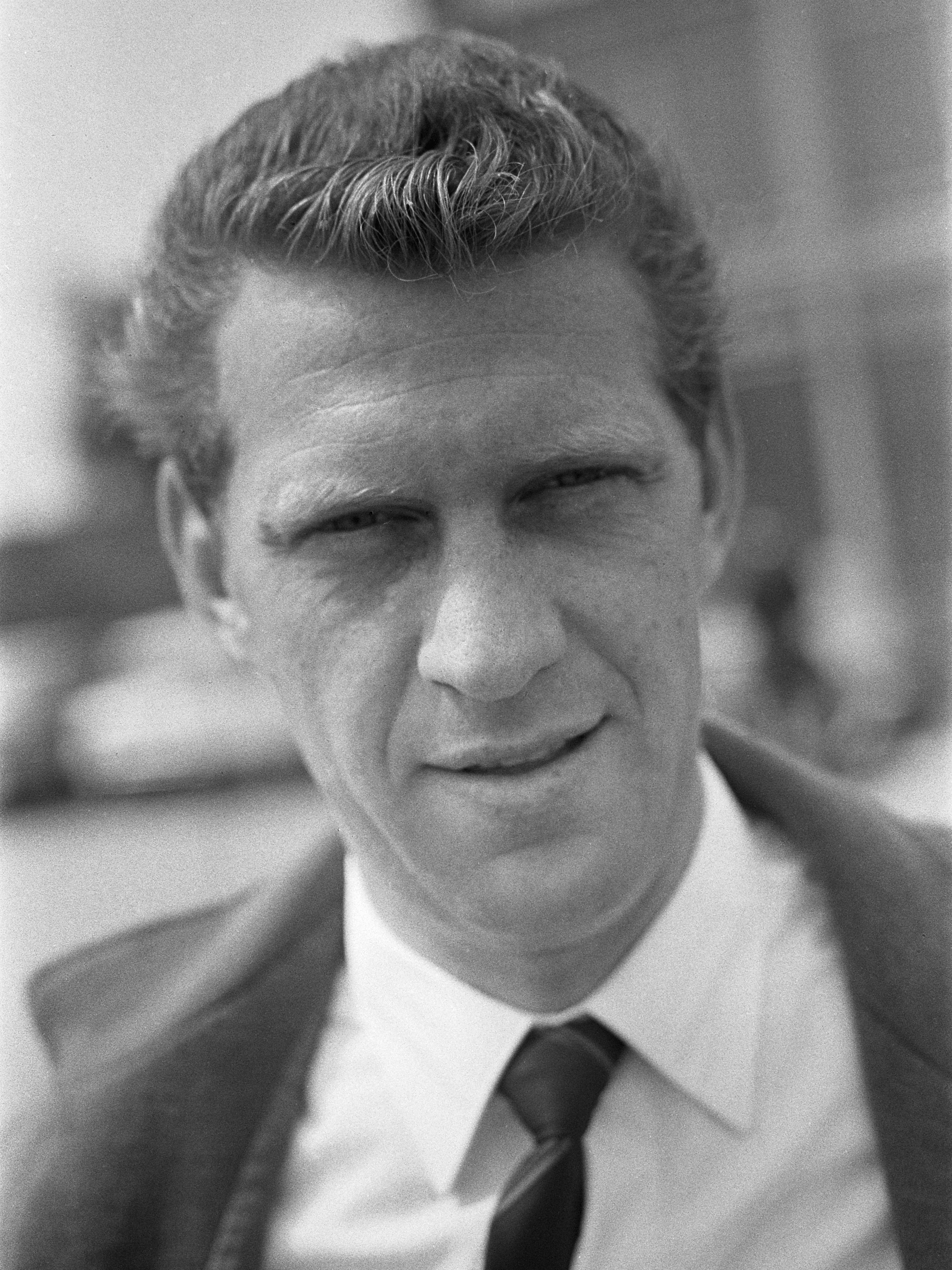
- Zilverberg in 1968

Personal information
- Full name: Hubertus Zilverberg
- Born: 13 January 1939 (age 87) Goirle, the Netherlands

Cycling career
- Sport: Cycling
- Discipline: Road
- Role: Rider

Major wins
- 1 stage 1962 Tour de France; 1 stage 1962 Giro d'Italia

Hubertus "Huub" Zilverberg (born 13 January 1939 in Goirle) is a Dutch former professional road bicycle racer. In 1962, Zilverberg won a stage in the Tour de France and in the Giro d'Italia.

== Major results ==
1959
Olympia's Tour
1961
Ronde van Vlaanderen (for independents)
Rijen
1962
Grand Prix du Parisien (with Rik Van Looy, Guillaume van Tongerloo, Edgard Sorgeloos, Joseph Planckaert and Peter Post)
Tour de France:

Winner stage 7

Giro d'Italia:

Winner stage 8

Schiedam
Leuze
1963
Rijen
Hulst
