= Jef Lahaye =

Dutch cyclist

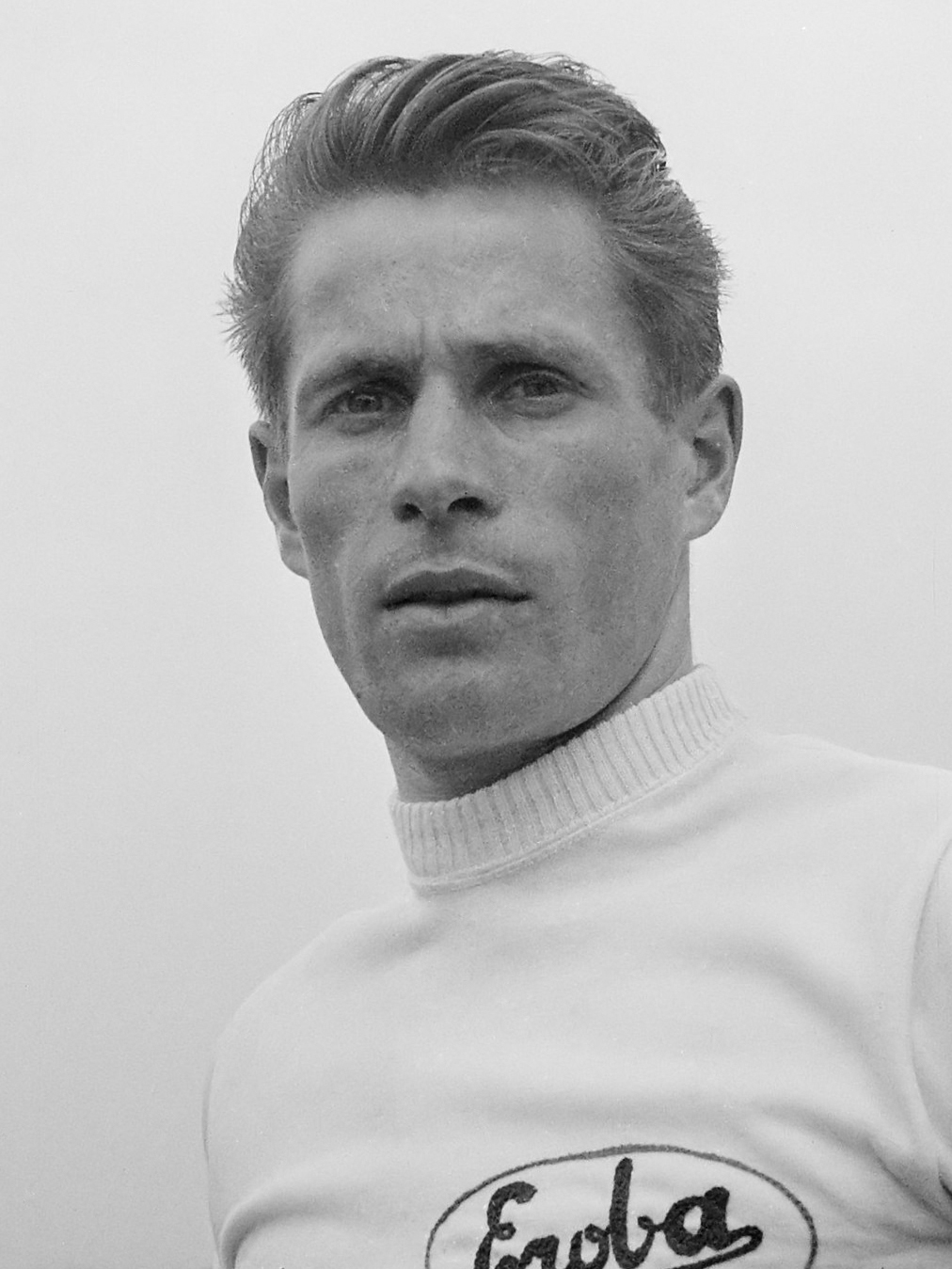
- Jef Lahaye in 1956

Personal information
- Born: 2 December 1932 Bunde, Limburg, Netherlands
- Died: 12 April 1990 (aged 57) Ulestraten, Netherlands

Cycling career
- Sport: Cycling
- Role: Rider

Jef Lahaye (2 December 1932 – 12 April 1990) was a Dutch professional racing cyclist. He rode in three editions of the Tour de France.
