= René Van Meenen =

Belgian cyclist

Personal information
- Born: 14 January 1931 (age 95) Drongen, Belgium

Cycling career
- Sport: Cycling
- Role: Rider

René Van Meenen (born 14 January 1931) is a Belgian professional racing cyclist. He won the Omloop Het Nieuwsblad in 1963.
