= François Mahé =

French road bicycle racer (1930–2015)

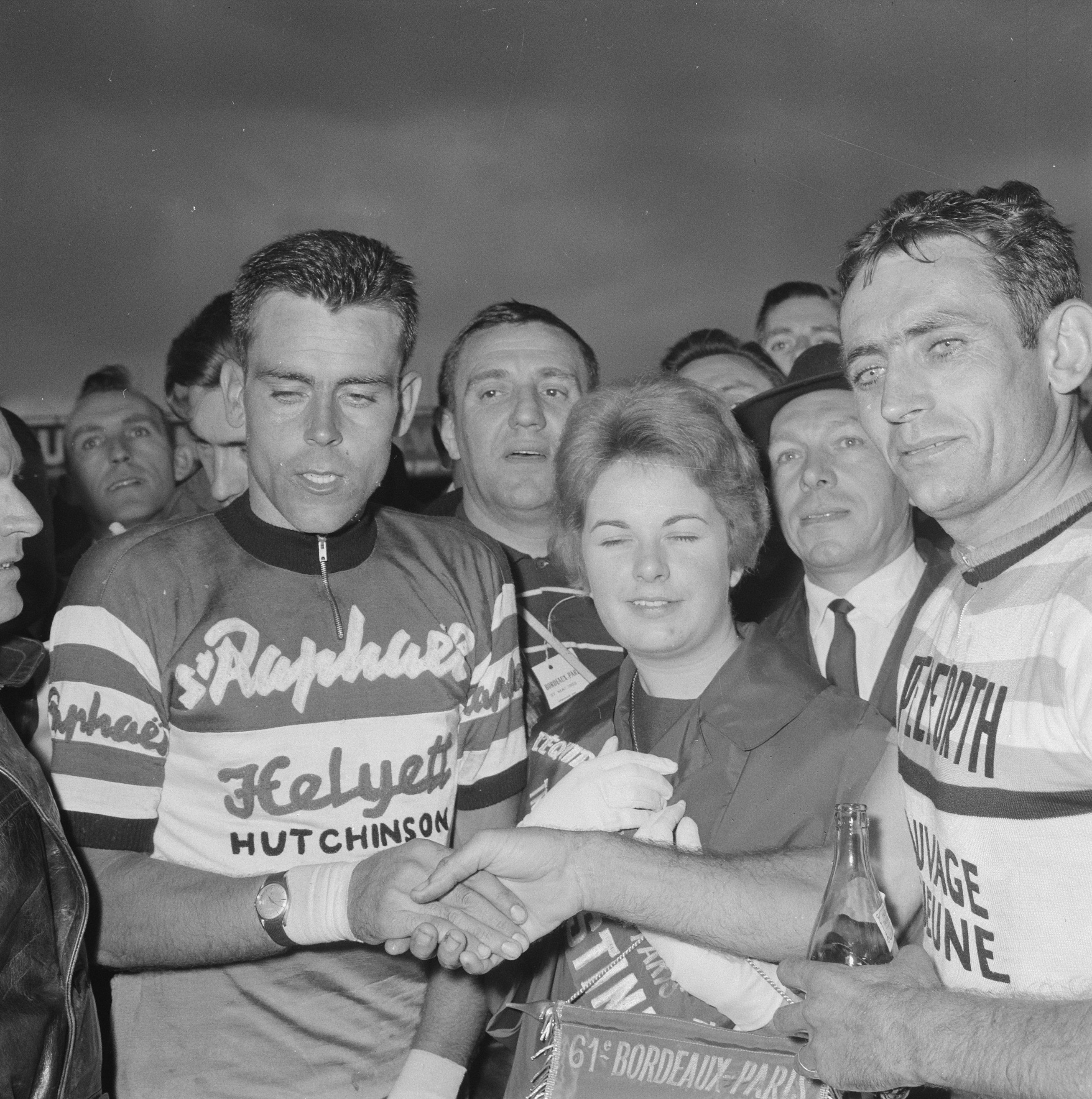

Personal information
- Full name: François Mahé
- Born: September 2, 1930 Arradon, France
- Died: May 31, 2015 (aged 84)

Cycling career
- Sport: Cycling
- Discipline: Road
- Role: Rider

Major wins
- One stage Tour de France

François Mahé (September 2, 1930 – May 31, 2015) was a French professional road bicycle racer. He was professional from 1950 to 1965. Highlights from his career include one day in the yellow jersey as leader of the general classification in the 1953 Tour de France, a stage win in 1954 Tour de France as well as a stage win in Vuelta a España, Paris–Nice, Tour de Luxembourg and the Critérium du Dauphiné Libéré and coming second in the 1952 edition of the GP Ouest-France and the 1954 edition of Tour of Flanders.

== Major results ==
1953
Tour de France:

Wearing yellow jersey for one day
10th place overall classification

1954
Tour de France:

Winner stage 21A

1955
Malansec
Tour de France:

10th place overall classification

1958
Querrien
1959
Bain-de-Bretagne
Tour de France:

5th place overall classification

1960
Brest
Camors
Chauffailles
Ploudalmezeau
1961
Vuelta a España:

Winner stages 2 and 14

1962
Maël-Carhaix
Plévin
1963
GP de Cannes
1965
Grandchamps
