= Vicente Iturat =

Spanish cyclist (1928–2017)

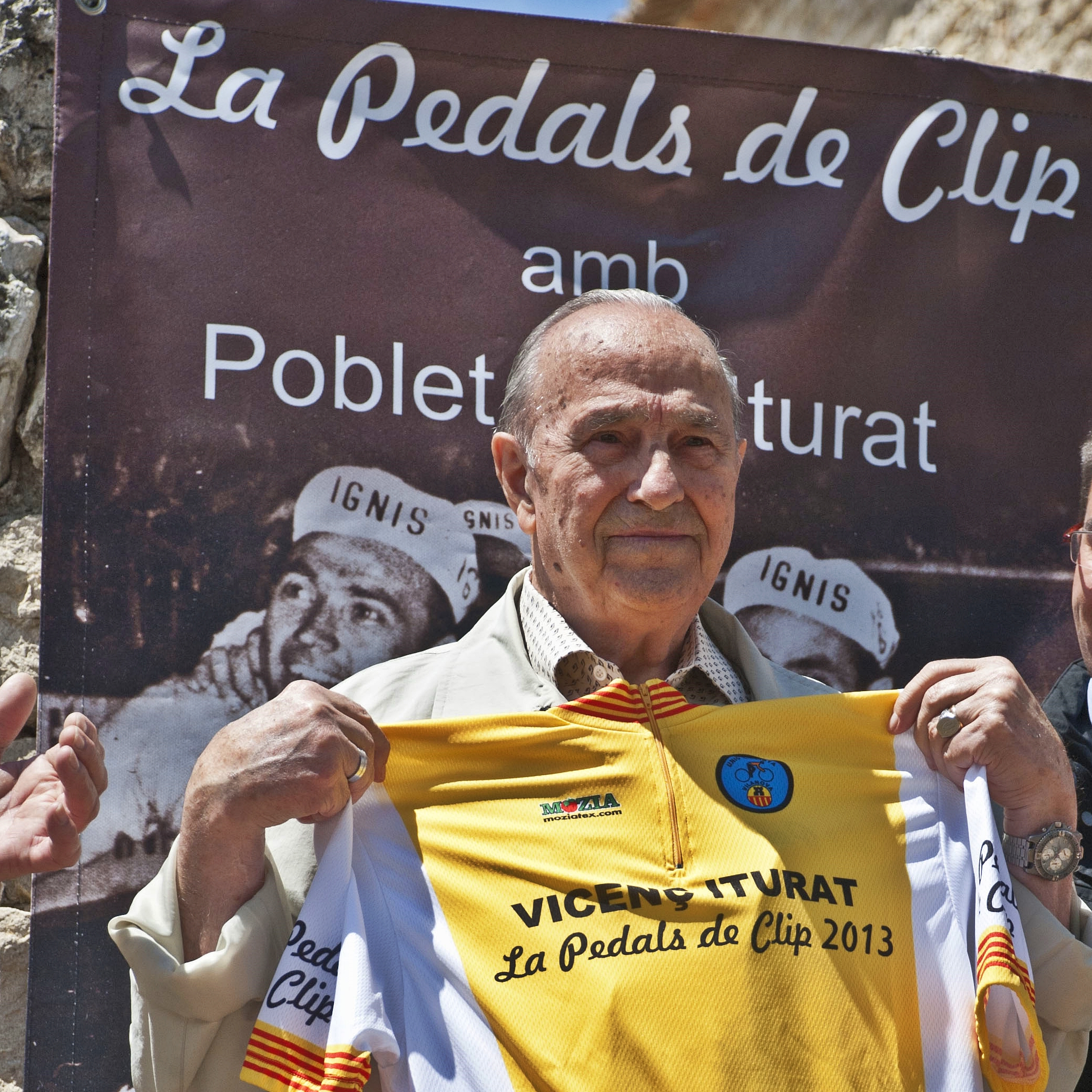
- Iturat in 2013

Personal information
- Born: 22 August 1928 Alcalà de Xivert, Spain
- Died: 18 August 2017 (aged 88) Vilanova i la Geltrú, Spain

Cycling career
- Sport: Cycling
- Current team: Retired
- Discipline: Road
- Role: Rider
- Rider type: Sprinter

Vicente Iturat Gil (22 August 1928 in Alcalà de Xivert – 18 August 2017 in Vilanova i la Geltrú) was a Spanish professional road cyclist. A sprinter, Iturat won the Points classification in the 1957 Vuelta a España, as well as four stages of the Vuelta a España throughout his career. He also competed in multiple editions of both the Giro d'Italia and the Tour de France. He also notably won the Euskal Bizikleta stage race in 1953.

== Major results ==
1952
2nd GP Pascuas
1953
1st Overall Euskal Bizikleta
2nd GP Pascuas
2nd Trofeo Masferrer
3rd Overall Vuelta a Asturias

1st Stages 4 & 6

1954
2nd Overall Volta a la Comunitat Valenciana
1955
1st GP Pascuas
3rd Overall Volta a Catalunya
2nd Overall Euskal Bizikleta
2nd Trofeo Masferrer
5th Overall Vuelta a España

1st Stage 8

1956
1st Stage 4 Volta a la Comunitat Valenciana
1st Stage 5 Volta a Catalunya
2nd Overall Volta a Catalunya

1st Stage 5

1957
1st Points classification Vuelta a España
1st Trofeo Masferrer
1958
1st Stage 4 Volta a Catalunya
1959
1st Stage 3 Vuelta a España
1st Stages 1 & 8 Vuelta a Andalucía
1960
1st Stage 11 Vuelta a España
1961
1st GP Pascuas
6th Overall Vuelta a España

1st Stage 3

1962
1st Stage 2 Euskal Bizikleta
