= Fernando Manzaneque =

Spanish cyclist (1934–2004)

Personal information
- Full name: Fernando Manzaneque Sánchez
- Born: 4 February 1934 Campo de Criptana, Spain
- Died: 5 June 2004 (aged 70) Alcazar san Juan, Spain

Cycling career
- Sport: Cycling
- Discipline: Road
- Role: Rider

Professional teams
- 1958: Faema-Guerra
- 1959: Licor 43
- 1960: Faema
- 1961: Licor 43
- 1962: Wiel's–Groene Leeuw
- 1962: Licor 43
- 1963–1967: Ferrys
- 1968: Karpy

Major wins
- Grand Tours Tour de France 3 individual stages (1960, 1963, 1967) Vuelta a España 2 individual stages (1959, 1965) Stage races Grand Prix du Midi Libre (1963)

Fernando Manzaneque Sánchez (4 February 1934 – 5 June 2004) was a Spanish professional road racing cyclist born in Campo de Criptana. Fernando was the older brother of Jesús Manzaneque.

== Major results ==
1955
1st Stage 9 Vuelta a Andalucía
1957
1st Stages 3 & 5 Tour du Maroc
1st Stage 7 Vuelta a Asturias
1958
1st Stage 2 Volta a Catalunya
3rd Overall Vuelta a España
1959
1st Stage 6 Vuelta a Andalucía
1st Stage 17 Vuelta a España
1960
1st Stage 18 Tour de France
1st Stages 5 & 7 Vuelta a Andalucía
1st Overall Vuelta a Levante

1st Stage 8

6th Overall Vuelta a España
1961
1st Stage 4 Bicicleta Eibarresa
1st Stage 6 Critérium du Dauphiné Libéré
6th Overall Tour de France
7th Overall Vuelta a España
1962
1st Overall Vuelta a Levante
8th Overall Vuelta a España
1963
1st Trofeo Jaumendreu
1st Overall Grand Prix du Midi Libre

1st Stage 4

1st Stage 16 Tour de France
1st Stage 5 Volta a Catalunya
1964
6th Overall Vuelta a España
1965
4th Overall Vuelta a España

1st Stage 5

1967
10th Overall Tour de France

1st Stage 16
