= Angelino Soler =

Spanish cyclist (born 1939)

Personal information
- Full name: Angelino Soler
- Nickname: Angelino Soler Romaguera
- Born: 25 November 1939 (age 86) Alcàsser, Spain

Cycling career
- Sport: Cycling
- Current team: Retired
- Discipline: Road
- Role: Rider

Professional teams
- 1960–1961: Faema
- 1961: Kas-Royal Alsport
- 1962: Ghigi
- 1962: Funcor–Munguia
- 1963: Faema–Flandria
- 1964: Inuri
- 1964: Ibac
- 1964: Massias
- 1965: Peugeot–BP–Michelin
- 1966: Ferrys
- 1967–1968: Karpy

Major wins
- 1961 Vuelta a España

Angelino Soler Romaguera (born Alcazar, 25 November 1939) is a former professional road bicycle racer from Spain who won the 1961 Vuelta a España. The following year, Soler captured three mountainous stages to win the climbers classification at the 1962 Giro d'Italia.

== Major achievements ==
1959
Volta a Lleida
1961 – Faema
1st, Overall, Vuelta a España

1st, Stage 6, (Tortosa > Valencia, 188 km
1st, Stage 1a, Team Time Trial

1962 – Ghigi
12th, Overall, Giro d'Italia

1st, KoM Classification
1st, Stage 3, (Sestri Levante > Panicogliara, 225 km
1st, Stage 16, (Aprica > Pian dei Resinelli, 123 km
1st, Stage 18, (Casale Monferrato > Frabrosa Soprana, 232 km

1963
2nd, Overall, Volta a Catalunya
6th, Overall, Tour de France
1965
22nd, Overall, Tour de France
1966
1st, Overall, Volta a la Comunitat Valenciana
