= Jesús Galdeano =

Spanish cyclist (1932–2017)

Personal information
- Born: 6 January 1932 Igúzquiza, Spain
- Died: 6 May 2017 (aged 85)

Cycling career
- Sport: Cycling
- Discipline: Road
- Role: Rider

Professional teams
- 1951–1954: Independent
- 1955: Gamma
- 1956–1961: Faema–Guerra
- 1962: Ghigi
- 1963: Cite

Jesús Galdeano (6 January 1932 – 6 May 2017) was a Spanish professional racing cyclist. He rode in three editions of the Tour de France.

== Major results ==
1952
1st GP Llodio
1955
1st Stage 4 Vuelta a España
1st Campeonato Vasco Navarro de Montaña
6th Overall Vuelta a Andalucía

1st Stages 3 & 4

1956
2nd Overall Euskal Bizikleta

1st Stage 6

1957
1st Stage 5 Vuelta a Levante
3rd Overall Vuelta a Andalucía
3rd Trofeo Jaumendreu
5th Trofeo Masferrer
1958
2nd GP Pascuas
1959
3rd National Road Race Championships
3rd Prueba Villafranca de Ordizia
10th Overall Vuelta a España
1960
1st Stage 12 Vuelta a España
2nd Prueba Villafranca de Ordizia
3rd Overall Vuelta a Levante
1961
1st Stage 5 Vuelta a España
