= Marcel Seynaeve =

Belgian cyclist

Personal information
- Born: 24 December 1933 Ichtegem, Belgium
- Died: 26 December 2015 (aged 82)

Cycling career
- Sport: Cycling
- Discipline: Road
- Role: Rider

Professional teams
- 1959–1962: Groene Leeuw–Sinalco–SAS
- 1963: Solo–Terrot

Marcel Seynaeve (24 December 1933 – 26 December 2015) was a Belgian racing cyclist. He rode in the 1963 Tour de France. He also won the 4th stage of the 1961 Vuelta a España.

== Major results ==
1959
10th Schaal Sels
1960
7th Overall Dwars door België
1961
1st Stage 4 Vuelta a España
1962
3rd De Kustpijl
6th Kuurne–Brussels–Kuurne
1964
8th Circuit des Frontières
