= Carmelo Morales Erostarbe =

Spanish cyclist

Personal information
- Born: 4 December 1930 Balmaseda, Spain
- Died: 28 April 2003 (aged 72) Castro Urdiales, Spain

Cycling career
- Sport: Cycling
- Role: Rider

Carmelo Morales Erostarbe (4 December 1930 – 28 April 2003) was a Spanish professional racing cyclist. He rode in seven editions of the Tour de France.
