= André Messelis =

Belgian cyclist (1931–2022)

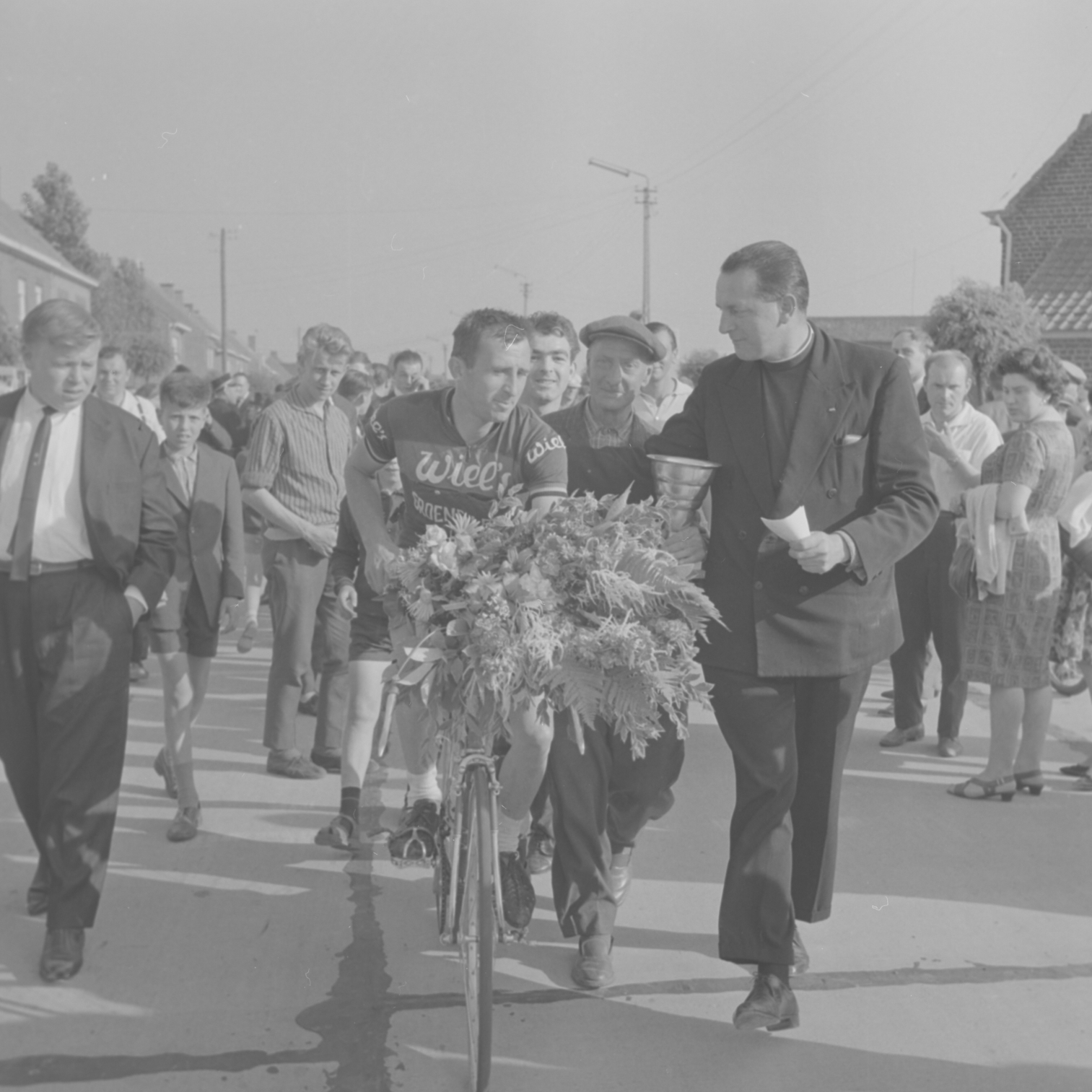
- André Messelis after winning 1964 Gullegem Koerse.

Personal information
- Born: 17 February 1931 Ledegem, Belgium
- Died: 17 February 2022 (aged 91)

Cycling career
- Sport: Cycling
- Role: Rider

André Messelis (17 February 1931 – 17 February 2022) was a Belgian professional racing cyclist. He won the E3 Harelbeke in 1962. Messelis died on 17 February 2022, at the age of 91.
