= Francisco Moreno Martínez =

Spanish cyclist

Personal information
- Born: 14 March 1931
- Died: 23 January 2018 (aged 86)

Cycling career
- Sport: Cycling
- Role: Rider

Francisco Moreno Martínez (14 March 1931 – 23 January 2018) was a Spanish racing cyclist. He rode in the 1958 Tour de France.
