= List of teams and cyclists in the 1959 Tour de France =

List of cyclists

In the 1959 Tour de France, the French team included Jacques Anquetil, Louison Bobet, Raphael Géminiani and Roger Riviere, who were all considered possible Tour winners. This also posed a problem, as they all wanted to be team captains, and refused to work for each other. The Spanish team was headed by Federico Bahamontes, who in previous years did not care for flat stages and time trials, and only tried to win the mountains classification. In the 1959 season, Bahamontes had Fausto Coppi as manager, and Coppi convinced Bahamontes to focus on the general classification. The defending champion Charly Gaul was again placed in a mixed team of Luxembourgian and Dutch cyclists, and expected little support. The Italian team did not include Vito Favero and Gastone Nencini, who had performed well in the 1958 Tour. Their team captain was Ercole Baldini, winner of the 1958 Giro d'Italia, but he was not expected to be able to compete against Gaul, Bahamontes and Anquetil. Of the cyclists in the French regional teams, Henri Anglade was the most notable. He was included in the Centre-Midi team,

The cyclists were represented by agents, who negotiated for the prices in post-tour criteriums. There were two major agents: Daniel Dousset, who represented Anquetil, Rivière and Bahamontes, and Piel Poulidor, who represented Anglade. This made it more important for Anquetil to help Bahamontes than Anglade.

== Teams ==
- Netherlands/Luxembourg (combined)
- Belgium
- Italy
- France
- Spain
- Switzerland/Germany (combined)
- International
- France Centre-Midi
- France Paris North-East
- France West South-West

== Cyclists ==
Legend
No.	Starting number worn by the rider during the Tour
Pos.	Position in the general classification
DNF	Denotes a rider who did not finish

=== By starting number ===
No.	Name	Nationality	Team	Pos.	Ref
1	Charly Gaul	Luxembourg	Netherlands/Luxembourg	12	
2	Aldo Bolzan	Italy	Netherlands/Luxembourg	45	
3	Marcel Ernzer	Luxembourg	Netherlands/Luxembourg	33	
4	Jean-Pierre Schmitz	Luxembourg	Netherlands/Luxembourg	DNF	
5	Piet Damen	Netherlands	Netherlands/Luxembourg	27	
6	Daan de Groot	Netherlands	Netherlands/Luxembourg	DNF	
7	Piet De Jongh	Netherlands	Netherlands/Luxembourg	DNF	
8	Jaap Kersten	Netherlands	Netherlands/Luxembourg	50	
9	Bram Kool	Netherlands	Netherlands/Luxembourg	DNF	
10	Martin Van Den Borgh	Netherlands	Netherlands/Luxembourg	DNF	
11	Piet van Est	Netherlands	Netherlands/Luxembourg	DNF	
12	Gerrit Voorting	Netherlands	Netherlands/Luxembourg	DNF	
21	Jan Adriaensens	Belgium	Belgium	7	
22	Jean Brankart	Belgium	Belgium	10	
23	Kamiel Buysse	Belgium	Belgium	61	
24	Fred De Bruyne	Belgium	Belgium	31	
25	Armand Desmet	Belgium	Belgium	23	
26	Jos Hoevenaers	Belgium	Belgium	8	
27	Marcel Janssens	Belgium	Belgium	25	
28	Eddy Pauwels	Belgium	Belgium	11	
29	Jef Planckaert	Belgium	Belgium	17	
30	Michel Van Aerde	Belgium	Belgium	22	
31	Martin Van Geneugden	Belgium	Belgium	53	
32	Guillaume Van Tongerloo	Belgium	Belgium	DNF	
41	Pierino Baffi	Italy	Italy	60	
42	Ercole Baldini	Italy	Italy	6	
43	Waldemaro Bartolozzi	Italy	Italy	57	
44	Dino Bruni	Italy	Italy	64	
45	Aurelio Cestari	Italy	Italy	38	
46	Nello Fabbri	Italy	Italy	42	
47	Roberto Falaschi	Italy	Italy	DNF	
48	Giuseppe Fallarini	Italy	Italy	DNF	
49	Vito Favero	Italy	Italy	DNF	
50	Michele Gismondi	Italy	Italy	30	
51	Arigo Padovan	Italy	Italy	52	
52	Ernesto Bono	Italy	Italy	36	
61	Jacques Anquetil	France	France	3	
62	Louison Bobet	France	France	DNF	
63	Robert Cazala	France	France	32	
64	André Darrigade	France	France	16	
65	Pierre Everaert	France	France	DNF	
66	Raphaël Géminiani	France	France	28	
67	Jean Graczyk	France	France	35	
68	Roger Hassenforder	France	France	DNF	
69	Raymond Mastrotto	France	France	DNF	
70	René Privat	France	France	DNF	
71	Roger Rivière	France	France	4	
72	Jean Stablinski	France	France	DNF	
81	Federico Bahamontes	Spain	Spain	1	
82	José Berrendero	Spain	Spain	DNF	
83	Juan Campillo Garcia	Spain	Spain	58	
84	José Gómez del Moral	Spain	Spain	47	
85	Jesús Galdeano	Spain	Spain	DNF	
86	Aniceto Utset	Spain	Spain	DNF	
87	René Marigil	Spain	Spain	DNF	
88	Fernando Manzaneque	Spain	Spain	14	
89	Luis Otaño	Spain	Spain	DNF	
90	Julio San Emeterio	Spain	Spain	40	
91	Carmelo Morales	Spain	Spain	43	
92	Antonio Suárez	Spain	Spain	DNF	
101	Ernest Ecuyer	Switzerland	Switzerland/Germany	DNF	
102	Rolf Graf	Switzerland	Switzerland/Germany	21	
103	Hans Hollenstein	Switzerland	Switzerland/Germany	DNF	
104	Emanuel Plattner	Switzerland	Switzerland/Germany	DNF	
105	Max Schellenberg	Switzerland	Switzerland/Germany	DNF	
106	Attilio Moresi	Switzerland	Switzerland/Germany	DNF	
107	Ernst Traxel	Switzerland	Switzerland/Germany	55	
108	Otto Altweck	West Germany	Switzerland/Germany	DNF	
109	Lothar Friedrich	West Germany	Switzerland/Germany	18	
110	Mathias Löder	West Germany	Switzerland/Germany	DNF	
111	Winfried Ommer	West Germany	Switzerland/Germany	DNF	
112	Frans Reitz	West Germany	Switzerland/Germany	49	
121	Adolf Christian	Austria	International	41	
122	Richard Durlacher	Austria	International	DNF	
123	Arne Jonsson	Denmark	International	DNF	
124	Ole-Bent Retvig	Denmark	International	DNF	
125	John Andrews	Great Britain	International	DNF	
126	Tony Hewson	Great Britain	International	DNF	
127	Brian Robinson	Great Britain	International	19	
128	Seamus Elliott	Ireland	International	DNF	
129	Victor Sutton	Great Britain	International	37	
130	Tadeusz Wierucki	Poland	International	DNF	
131	Antonino Baptista	Portugal	International	DNF	
132	José Sousa Cardoso	Portugal	International	DNF	
141	Jean Anastasi	France	France - Centre/Midi	DNF	
142	Henry Anglade	France	France - Centre/Midi	2	
143	Louis Bergaud	France	France - Centre/Midi	13	
144	Louis Bisilliat	France	France - Centre/Midi	65	
145	Emmanuel Busto	France	France - Centre/Midi	39	
146	Michel Dejouhannet	France	France - Centre/Midi	DNF	
147	Jean Dotto	France	France - Centre/Midi	15	
148	Jean Forestier	France	France - Centre/Midi	34	
149	Bernard Gauthier	France	France - Centre/Midi	DNF	
150	Valentin Huot	France	France - Centre/Midi	48	
151	Marcel Rohrbach	France	France - Centre/Midi	51	
152	Louis Rostollan	France	France - Centre/Midi	59	
161	Jean-Claude Annaert	France	France - Paris/North-East	DNF	
162	Jean Hoffmann	France	France - Paris/North-East	DNF	
163	Jacques Champion	France	France - Paris/North-East	DNF	
164	Édouard Delberghe	France	France - Paris/North-East	54	
165	Raymond Hoorelbeke	France	France - Paris/North-East	29	
166	Stéphane Lach	France	France - Paris/North-East	DNF	
167	André Le Dissez	France	France - Paris/North-East	DNF	
168	Jean-Claude Lefebvre	France	France - Paris/North-East	DNF	
169	Orphée Meneghini	France	France - Paris/North-East	DNF	
170	René Pavard	France	France - Paris/North-East	DNF	
171	Jean Robic	France	France - Paris/North-East	DNF	
172	Michel Vermeulin	France	France - Paris/North-East	20	
181	Max Bleneau	France	France - West/South-West	63	
182	Albert Bouvet	France	France - West/South-West	DNF	
183	Jean Gainche	France	France - West/South-West	DNF	
184	Joseph Groussard	France	France - West/South-West	56	
185	Félix Lebuhotel	France	France - West/South-West	46	
186	François Mahé	France	France - West/South-West	5	
187	Fernand Picot	France	France - West/South-West	44	
188	Francis Pipelin	France	France - West/South-West	DNF	
189	Marcel Queheille	France	France - West/South-West	26	
190	Gérard Saint	France	France - West/South-West	9	
191	Tino Sabbadini	France	France - West/South-West	62	
192	Joseph Thomin	France	France - West/South-West	24	

=== By team ===
Netherlands/Luxembourg
No.	Rider	Pos.
1	Charly Gaul (LUX)	12
2	Aldo Bolzan (ITA)	45
3	Marcel Ernzer (LUX)	33
4	Jean-Pierre Schmitz (LUX)	DNF
5	Piet Damen (NED)	27
6	Daan de Groot (NED)	DNF
7	Piet De Jongh (NED)	DNF
8	Jaap Kersten (NED)	50
9	Abraham Kool (NED)	DNF
10	Martin Van Den Borgh (NED)	DNF
11	Piet van Est (NED)	DNF
12	Gerrit Voorting (NED)	DNF

Belgium
No.	Rider	Pos.
21	Jan Adriaensens (BEL)	7
22	Jean Brankart (BEL)	10
23	Kamiel Buysse (BEL)	61
24	Fred De Bruyne (BEL)	31
25	Armand Desmet (BEL)	23
26	Jos Hoevenaers (BEL)	8
27	Marcel Janssens (BEL)	25
28	Eddy Pauwels (BEL)	11
29	Jef Planckaert (BEL)	17
30	Michel Van Aerde (BEL)	22
31	Martin Van Geneugden (BEL)	53
32	Guillaume Van Tongerloo (BEL)	DNF

Italy
No.	Rider	Pos.
41	Pierino Baffi (ITA)	60
42	Ercole Baldini (ITA)	6
43	Waldemaro Bartolozzi (ITA)	57
44	Dino Bruni (ITA)	64
45	Aurelio Cestari (ITA)	38
46	Nello Fabbri (ITA)	42
47	Roberto Falaschi (ITA)	DNF
48	Giuseppe Fallarini (ITA)	DNF
49	Vito Favero (ITA)	DNF
50	Michele Gismondi (ITA)	30
51	Arigo Padovan (ITA)	52
52	Ernesto Bono (ITA)	36

France
No.	Rider	Pos.
61	Jacques Anquetil (FRA)	3
62	Louison Bobet (FRA)	DNF
63	Robert Cazala (FRA)	32
64	André Darrigade (FRA)	16
65	Pierre Everaert (FRA)	DNF
66	Raphaël Géminiani (FRA)	28
67	Jean Graczyk (FRA)	35
68	Roger Hassenforder (FRA)	DNF
69	Raymond Mastrotto (FRA)	DNF
70	René Privat (FRA)	DNF
71	Roger Rivière (FRA)	4
72	Jean Stablinski (FRA)	DNF

Spain
No.	Rider	Pos.
81	Federico Bahamontes (ESP)	1
82	José Berrendero (ESP)	DNF
83	Juan Campillo Garcia (ESP)	58
84	José Gómez del Moral (ESP)	47
85	Jesús Galdeano (ESP)	DNF
86	Aniceto Utset (ESP)	DNF
87	René Marigil (ESP)	DNF
88	Fernando Manzaneque (ESP)	14
89	Luis Otaño (ESP)	DNF
90	Julio San Emeterio (ESP)	40
91	Carmelo Morales (ESP)	43
92	Antonio Suárez (ESP)	DNF

Switzerland/Germany
No.	Rider	Pos.
101	Ernest Ecuyer (SUI)	DNF
102	Rolf Graf (SUI)	21
103	Hans Hollenstein (SUI)	DNF
104	Emmanuel Plattner (SUI)	DNF
105	Max Schellenberg (SUI)	DNF
106	Attilio Moresi (SUI)	DNF
107	Ernst Traxel (SUI)	55
108	Otto Altweck (FRG)	DNF
109	Lothar Friedrich (FRG)	18
110	Mathias Löder (FRG)	DNF
111	Winfried Ommer (FRG)	DNF
112	Frans Reitz (FRG)	49

International
No.	Rider	Pos.
121	Adolf Christian (AUT)	41
122	Richard Durlacher (AUT)	DNF
123	Arne Jonsson (DEN)	DNF
124	Ole-Bent Retvig (DEN)	DNF
125	John Andrews (GBR)	DNF
126	Tony Hewson (GBR)	DNF
127	Brian Robinson (GBR)	19
128	Seamus Elliott (IRL)	DNF
129	Victor Sutton (GBR)	37
130	Tadeusz Wierucki (POL)	DNF
131	Antonino Baptista (POR)	DNF
132	José Sousa Cardoso (POR)	DNF

France - Centre/Midi
No.	Rider	Pos.
141	Jean Anastasi (FRA)	DNF
142	Henry Anglade (FRA)	2
143	Louis Bergaud (FRA)	13
144	Louis Bisilliat (FRA)	65
145	Emmanuel Busto (FRA)	39
146	Michel Dejouhannet (FRA)	DNF
147	Jean Dotto (FRA)	15
148	Jean Forestier (FRA)	34
149	Bernard Gauthier (FRA)	DNF
150	Valentin Huot (FRA)	48
151	Marcel Rohrbach (FRA)	51
152	Louis Rostollan (FRA)	59

France - Paris/North-East
No.	Rider	Pos.
161	Jean-Claude Annaert (FRA)	DNF
162	Jean Hoffmann (FRA)	DNF
163	Jacques Champion (FRA)	DNF
164	Édouard Delberghe (FRA)	54
165	Raymond Hoorelbeke (FRA)	29
166	Stéphane Lach (FRA)	DNF
167	André Le Dissez (FRA)	DNF
168	Jean-Claude Lefebvre (FRA)	DNF
169	Orphée Meneghini (FRA)	DNF
170	René Pavard (FRA)	DNF
171	Jean Robic (FRA)	DNF
172	Michel Vermeulin (FRA)	20

France - West/South-West
No.	Rider	Pos.
181	Max Bleneau (FRA)	63
182	Albert Bouvet (FRA)	DNF
183	Jean Gainche (FRA)	DNF
184	Joseph Groussard (FRA)	56
185	Félix Lebuhotel (FRA)	46
186	François Mahé (FRA)	5
187	Fernand Picot (FRA)	44
188	Francis Pipelin (FRA)	DNF
189	Marcel Queheille (FRA)	26
190	Gérard Saint (FRA)	9
191	Tino Sabbadini (FRA)	62
192	Joseph Thomin (FRA)	24
