= 1959 Tour de France, Stage 1 to Stage 11 =

Cycling race stages

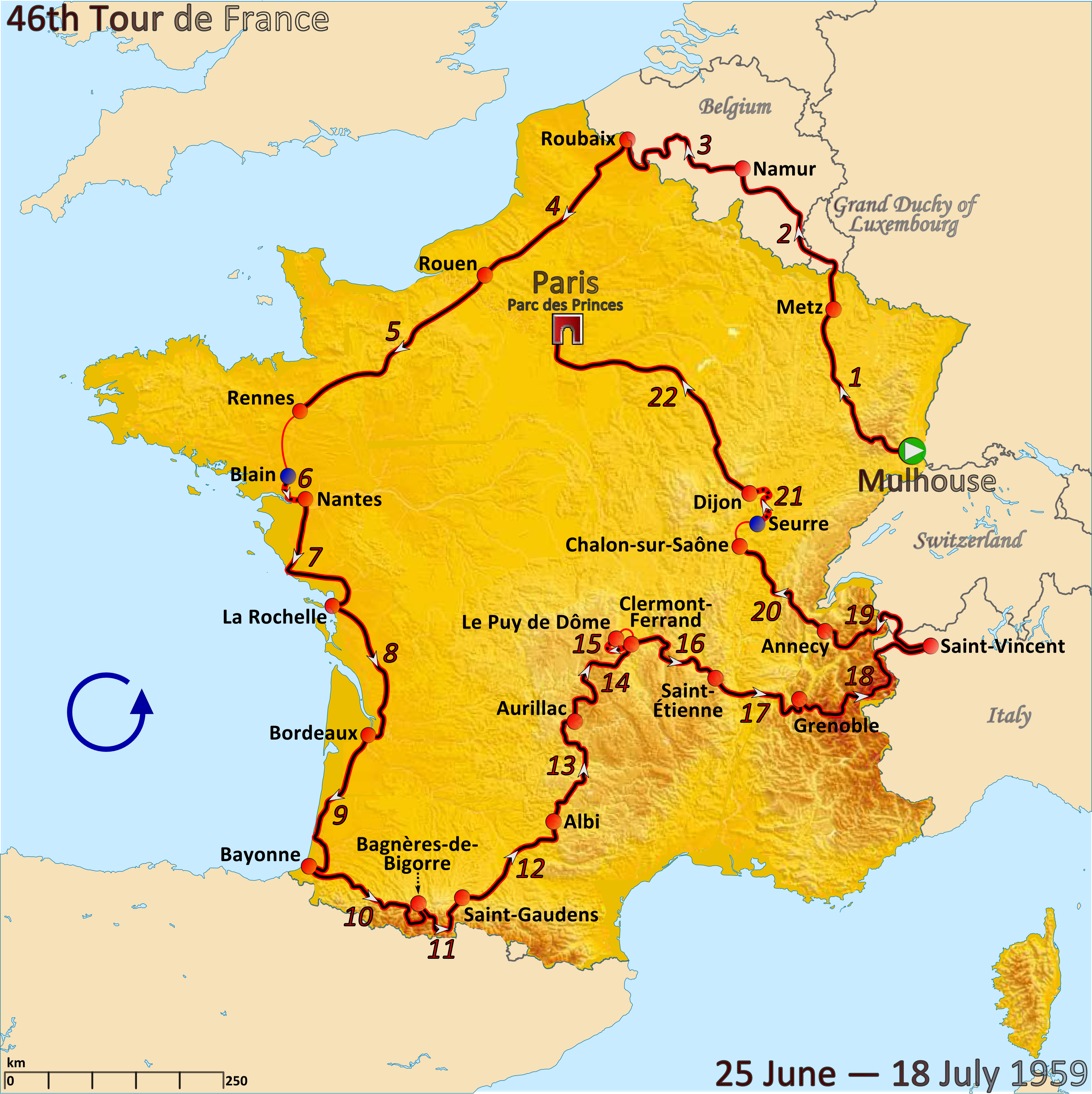
Route of the 1959 Tour de France

The 1959 Tour de France was the 46th edition of Tour de France, one of cycling's Grand Tours. The Tour began in Mulhouse with a flat stage on 25 June and Stage 11 occurred on 6 July with a mountainous stage to Saint-Gaudens. The race finished in Paris on 18 July.

== Stage 1 ==
25 June 1959 - Mulhouse to Metz, 238 km (147.9 mi)

Stage 1 result

Rank	Rider	Team	Time
1	André Darrigade (FRA)	France	5h 33' 45"
2	Daan de Groot (NED)	Netherlands/Luxembourg	s.t.
3	Orphée Meneghini (FRA)	France - Paris/North-East	s.t.
4	Pierino Baffi (ITA)	Italy	s.t.
5	Jos Hoevenaers (BEL)	Belgium	s.t.
6	Piet van Est (NED)	Netherlands/Luxembourg	s.t.
7	Jaap Kersten (NED)	Netherlands/Luxembourg	s.t.
8	Jean Graczyk (FRA)	France	s.t.
9	Nello Fabbri (ITA)	Italy	s.t.
10	Bram Kool (NED)	Netherlands/Luxembourg	s.t.

General classification after stage 1

Rank	Rider	Team	Time
1	André Darrigade (FRA)	France	5h 33' 45"
2	Daan de Groot (NED)	Netherlands/Luxembourg	+ 30"
3	Orphée Meneghini (FRA)	France - Paris/North-East	+ 1' 00"
4	Pierino Baffi (ITA)	Italy	s.t.
5	Jos Hoevenaers (BEL)	Belgium	s.t.
6	Piet van Est (NED)	Netherlands/Luxembourg	s.t.
7	Jaap Kersten (NED)	Netherlands/Luxembourg	s.t.
8	Jean Graczyk (FRA)	France	s.t.
9	Nello Fabbri (ITA)	Italy	s.t.
10	Bram Kool (NED)	Netherlands/Luxembourg	s.t.

== Stage 2 ==
26 June 1959 - Metz to Namur, 234 km (145.4 mi)

Stage 2 result

Rank	Rider	Team	Time
1	Vito Favero (ITA)	Italy	6h 25' 02"
2	Jean Gainche (FRA)	France - West/South-West	s.t.
3	Michel Dejouhannet (FRA)	France - Centre/Midi	s.t.
4	Roger Rivière (FRA)	France	s.t.
5	Martin Van Geneugden (BEL)	Belgium	s.t.
6	Brian Robinson (GBR)	International	s.t.
7	Jacques Anquetil (FRA)	France	s.t.
8	Ercole Baldini (ITA)	Italy	s.t.
9	Federico Bahamontes (ESP)	Spain	s.t.
10	Seamus Elliott (IRL)	International	s.t.

General classification after stage 2

Rank	Rider	Team	Time
1	André Darrigade (FRA)	France	11h 58' 00"
2	Daan de Groot (NED)	Netherlands/Luxembourg	+ 31"
3	Federico Bahamontes (ESP)	Spain	+ 47"
4	Jean Graczyk (FRA)	France	+ 1' 01"
5	Nello Fabbri (ITA)	Italy	s.t.
6	Bernard Gauthier (FRA)	France - Centre/Midi	s.t.
7	Piet van Est (NED)	Netherlands/Luxembourg	+ 1' 06"
8	Fred De Bruyne (BEL)	Belgium	s.t.
9	Rolf Graf (SUI)	Switzerland/Germany	s.t.
10	Louis Bergaud (FRA)	France - Centre/Midi	s.t.

== Stage 3 ==
27 June 1959 - Namur to Roubaix, 217 km (135 mi)

Stage 3 result

Rank	Rider	Team	Time
1	Robert Cazala (FRA)	France	6h 11' 04"
2	Jean-Claude Annaert (FRA)	France - Paris/North-East	s.t.
3	Max Schellenberg (SUI)	Switzerland/Germany	s.t.
4	Fernand Picot (FRA)	France - West/South-West	s.t.
5	Jean Stablinski (FRA)	France	s.t.
6	Armand Desmet (BEL)	Belgium	s.t.
7	Antonino Baptista (POR)	International	s.t.
8	Michel Vermeulin (FRA)	France - Paris/North-East	s.t.
9	Bernard Gauthier (FRA)	France - Centre/Midi	s.t.
10	Eddy Pauwels (BEL)	Belgium	s.t.

General classification after stage 3

Rank	Rider	Team	Time
1	Robert Cazala (FRA)	France	18h 09' 38"
2	Bernard Gauthier (FRA)	France - Centre/Midi	+ 27"
3	Michel Vermeulin (FRA)	France - Paris/North-East	+ 1' 42"
4	Jean-Claude Annaert (FRA)	France - Paris/North-East	+ 1' 45"
5	Fernand Picot (FRA)	France - West/South-West	+ 1' 56"
6	Max Schellenberg (SUI)	Switzerland/Germany	s.t.
7	Armand Desmet (BEL)	Belgium	+ 2' 01"
8	Eddy Pauwels (BEL)	Belgium	+ 2' 15"
9	Jean Stablinski (FRA)	France	+ 2' 28"
10	Antonino Baptista (POR)	International	+ 3' 27"

== Stage 4 ==
28 June 1959 - Roubaix to Rouen, 230 km (140 mi)

Stage 4 result

Rank	Rider	Team	Time
1	Dino Bruni (ITA)	Italy	6h 40' 36"
2	Michel Van Aerde (BEL)	Belgium	s.t.
3	Arigo Padovan (ITA)	Italy	+ 6"
4	Roberto Falaschi (ITA)	Italy	s.t.
5	Armand Desmet (BEL)	Belgium	s.t.
6	Gerrit Voorting (NED)	Netherlands/Luxembourg	s.t.
7	Piet van Est (NED)	Netherlands/Luxembourg	s.t.
8	Michel Dejouhannet (FRA)	France - Centre/Midi	s.t.
9	André Darrigade (FRA)	France	s.t.
10	Juan Campillo (ESP)	Spain	s.t.

General classification after stage 4

Rank	Rider	Team	Time
1	Robert Cazala (FRA)	France	24h 50' 20"
2	Bernard Gauthier (FRA)	France - Centre/Midi	+ 27"
3	Michel Vermeulin (FRA)	France - Paris/North-East	+ 1' 42"
4	Jean-Claude Annaert (FRA)	France - Paris/North-East	+ 1' 45"
5	Fernand Picot (FRA)	France - West/South-West	+ 1' 56"
6	Max Schellenberg (SUI)	Switzerland/Germany	s.t.
7	Armand Desmet (BEL)	Belgium	+ 2' 01"
8	Eddy Pauwels (BEL)	Belgium	+ 2' 15"
9	Jean Stablinski (FRA)	France	+ 2' 28"
10	Antonino Baptista (POR)	International	+ 3' 27"

== Stage 5 ==
29 June 1959 - Rouen to Rennes, 286 km (178 mi)

Stage 5 result

Rank	Rider	Team	Time
1	Jean Graczyk (FRA)	France	8h 06' 36"
2	André Darrigade (FRA)	France	s.t.
3	Vito Favero (ITA)	Italy	s.t.
4	Jos Hoevenaers (BEL)	Belgium	s.t.
5	Pierino Baffi (ITA)	Italy	s.t.
6	Piet De Jongh (NED)	Netherlands/Luxembourg	s.t.
7	Francis Pipelin (FRA)	France - West/South-West	s.t.
8	Jesús Galdeano (ESP)	Spain	s.t.
9	René Privat (FRA)	France	s.t.
10	Pierre Everaert (FRA)	France	s.t.

General classification after stage 5

Rank	Rider	Team	Time
1	Robert Cazala (FRA)	France	32h 59' 14"
2	Bernard Gauthier (FRA)	France - Centre/Midi	+ 27"
3	Michel Vermeulin (FRA)	France - Paris/North-East	+ 1' 42"
4	Jean-Claude Annaert (FRA)	France - Paris/North-East	+ 1' 45"
5	Fernand Picot (FRA)	France - West/South-West	+ 1' 56"
6	Max Schellenberg (SUI)	Switzerland/Germany	s.t.
7	Armand Desmet (BEL)	Belgium	+ 2' 01"
8	Eddy Pauwels (BEL)	Belgium	+ 2' 15"
9	Jean Stablinski (FRA)	France	+ 2' 28"
10	Antonino Baptista (POR)	International	+ 3' 27"

== Stage 6 ==
30 June 1959 - Blain to Nantes, 45 km (28 mi) (ITT)

Stage 6 result

Rank	Rider	Team	Time
1	Roger Rivière (FRA)	France	56' 46"
2	Ercole Baldini (ITA)	Italy	+ 21"
3	Jacques Anquetil (FRA)	France	+ 58"
4	Rolf Graf (SUI)	Switzerland/Germany	+ 1' 05"
5	Gérard Saint (FRA)	France - West/South-West	+ 1' 12"
6	Charly Gaul (LUX)	Netherlands/Luxembourg	+ 1' 36"
7	Jean Brankart (BEL)	Belgium	+ 2' 01"
8	Henry Anglade (FRA)	France - Centre/Midi	+ 2' 11"
9	Ernesto Bono (ITA)	Italy	+ 2' 57"
10	Federico Bahamontes (ESP)	Spain	+ 2' 58"

General classification after stage 6

Rank	Rider	Team	Time
1	Robert Cazala (FRA)	France	33h 59' 45"
2	Bernard Gauthier (FRA)	France - Centre/Midi	+ 1' 27"
3	Jean-Claude Annaert (FRA)	France - Paris/North-East	+ 2' 11"
4	Michel Vermeulin (FRA)	France - Paris/North-East	+ 2' 12"
5	Armand Desmet (BEL)	Belgium	+ 3' 29"
6	Max Schellenberg (SUI)	Switzerland/Germany	+ 4' 02"
7	Eddy Pauwels (BEL)	Belgium	+ 4' 23"
8	Fernand Picot (FRA)	France - West/South-West	s.t.
9	Jean Stablinski (FRA)	France	+ 6' 26"
10	Antonino Baptista (POR)	International	+ 7' 04"

== Stage 7 ==
1 July 1959 - Nantes to La Rochelle, 190 km (120 mi)

Stage 7 result

Rank	Rider	Team	Time
1	Roger Hassenforder (FRA)	France	4h 22' 44"
2	Martin Van Geneugden (BEL)	Belgium	s.t.
3	Tino Sabbadini (FRA)	France - West/South-West	s.t.
4	Gerrit Voorting (NED)	Netherlands/Luxembourg	s.t.
5	Pierino Baffi (ITA)	Italy	s.t.
6	Brian Robinson (GBR)	International	s.t.
7	Jan Adriaensens (BEL)	Belgium	s.t.
8	Max Bleneau (FRA)	France - West/South-West	s.t.
9	Jaap Kersten (NED)	Netherlands/Luxembourg	s.t.
10	Arne Jonsson (DEN)	International	s.t.

General classification after stage 7

Rank	Rider	Team	Time
1	Robert Cazala (FRA)	France	38h 27' 17"
2	Bernard Gauthier (FRA)	France - Centre/Midi	+ 1' 27"
3	Jean-Claude Annaert (FRA)	France - Paris/North-East	+ 2' 11"
4	Michel Vermeulin (FRA)	France - Paris/North-East	+ 2' 12"
5	Armand Desmet (BEL)	Belgium	+ 3' 29"
6	Max Schellenberg (SUI)	Switzerland/Germany	+ 4' 02"
7	Eddy Pauwels (BEL)	Belgium	+ 4' 23"
8	Fernand Picot (FRA)	France - West/South-West	s.t.
9	Jean Stablinski (FRA)	France	+ 6' 26"
10	Henry Anglade (FRA)	France - Centre/Midi	+ 6' 45"

== Stage 8 ==
2 July 1959 - La Rochelle to Bordeaux, 201 km (125 mi)

Stage 8 result

Rank	Rider	Team	Time
1	Michel Dejouhannet (FRA)	France - Centre/Midi	4h 53' 16"
2	Jean Stablinski (FRA)	France	s.t.
3	Seamus Elliott (IRL)	International	s.t.
4	Jean Forestier (FRA)	France - Centre/Midi	s.t.
5	Martin Van Den Borgh (NED)	Netherlands/Luxembourg	s.t.
6	Fernando Manzaneque (ESP)	Spain	s.t.
7	Jan Adriaensens (BEL)	Belgium	s.t.
8	Albert Bouvet (FRA)	France - West/South-West	s.t.
9	Stéphane Lach (FRA)	France - Paris/North-East	s.t.
10	Tino Sabbadini (FRA)	France - West/South-West	+ 1' 27"

General classification after stage 8

Rank	Rider	Team	Time
1	Robert Cazala (FRA)	France	43h 22' 04"
2	Bernard Gauthier (FRA)	France - Centre/Midi	+ 1' 27"
3	Jean-Claude Annaert (FRA)	France - Paris/North-East	+ 2' 11"
4	Michel Vermeulin (FRA)	France - Paris/North-East	+ 2' 12"
5	Armand Desmet (BEL)	Belgium	+ 3' 29"
6	Max Schellenberg (SUI)	Switzerland/Germany	+ 4' 02"
7	Eddy Pauwels (BEL)	Belgium	+ 4' 23"
8	Fernand Picot (FRA)	France - West/South-West	s.t.
9	Jean Stablinski (FRA)	France	+ 4' 25"
10	Henry Anglade (FRA)	France - Centre/Midi	+ 6' 45"

== Stage 9 ==
3 July 1959 - Bordeaux to Bayonne, 207 km (129 mi)

Stage 9 result

Rank	Rider	Team	Time
1	Marcel Queheille (FRA)	France - West/South-West	5h 19' 17"
2	Fernando Manzaneque (ESP)	Spain	+ 1' 27"
3	Nello Fabbri (ITA)	Italy	s.t.
4	Jos Hoevenaers (BEL)	Belgium	+ 2' 43"
5	Jean Graczyk (FRA)	France	s.t.
6	Henry Anglade (FRA)	France - Centre/Midi	s.t.
7	Jacques Anquetil (FRA)	France	s.t.
8	Michel Van Aerde (BEL)	Belgium	s.t.
9	Federico Bahamontes (ESP)	Spain	s.t.
10	Roger Rivière (FRA)	France	s.t.

General classification after stage 9

Rank	Rider	Team	Time
1	Eddy Pauwels (BEL)	Belgium	48h 48' 27"
2	Robert Cazala (FRA)	France	+ 1' 46"
3	Henry Anglade (FRA)	France - Centre/Midi	+ 2' 22"
4	Bernard Gauthier (FRA)	France - Centre/Midi	+ 3' 13"
5	Jan Adriaensens (BEL)	Belgium	+ 3' 22"
6	Jos Hoevenaers (BEL)	Belgium	+ 3' 32"
7	Roger Rivière (FRA)	France	+ 3' 38"
8	Jean-Claude Annaert (FRA)	France - Paris/North-East	+ 3' 57"
9	Michel Vermeulin (FRA)	France - Paris/North-East	+ 3' 58"
10	Pierino Baffi (ITA)	Italy	+ 4' 21"

== Rest Day 1 ==
4 July 1959 - Bayonne

== Stage 10 ==
5 July 1959 - Bayonne to Bagnères-de-Bigorre, 235 km (146 mi)

Stage 10 result

Rank	Rider	Team	Time
1	Marcel Janssens (BEL)	Belgium	6h 23' 33"
2	René Privat (FRA)	France	s.t.
3	François Mahé (FRA)	France - West/South-West	s.t.
4	Michel Vermeulin (FRA)	France - Paris/North-East	s.t.
5	Armand Desmet (BEL)	Belgium	s.t.
6	Gérard Saint (FRA)	France - West/South-West	+ 1' 56"
7	Jos Hoevenaers (BEL)	Belgium	+ 2' 48"
8	Ernesto Bono (ITA)	Italy	+ 4' 44"
9	René Marigil (ESP)	Spain	+ 4' 45"
10	Bernard Gauthier (FRA)	France - Centre/Midi	+ 7' 35"

General classification after stage 10

Rank	Rider	Team	Time
1	Michel Vermeulin (FRA)	France - Paris/North-East	55h 15' 58"
2	Armand Desmet (BEL)	Belgium	+ 1' 17"
3	Jos Hoevenaers (BEL)	Belgium	+ 2' 22"
4	Marcel Janssens (BEL)	Belgium	+ 6' 47"
5	Bernard Gauthier (FRA)	France - Centre/Midi	+ 6' 50"
6	Ernesto Bono (ITA)	Italy	+ 9' 36"
7	Gérard Saint (FRA)	France - West/South-West	+ 10' 18"
8	Eddy Pauwels (BEL)	Belgium	+ 10' 52"
9	Henry Anglade (FRA)	France - Centre/Midi	+ 10' 57"
10	François Mahé (FRA)	France - West/South-West	+ 11' 24"

== Stage 11 ==
6 July 1959 - Bagnères-de-Bigorre to Saint-Gaudens, 119 km (74 mi)

Stage 11 result

Rank	Rider	Team	Time
1	André Darrigade (FRA)	France	3h 19' 30"
2	Gérard Saint (FRA)	France - West/South-West	s.t.
3	Louison Bobet (FRA)	France	s.t.
4	Jacques Anquetil (FRA)	France	s.t.
5	Michel Vermeulin (FRA)	France - Paris/North-East	s.t.
6	Jos Hoevenaers (BEL)	Belgium	s.t.
7	Rolf Graf (SUI)	Switzerland/Germany	s.t.
8	Armand Desmet (BEL)	Belgium	s.t.
9	Raymond Hoorelbeke (FRA)	France - Paris/North-East	s.t.
10	Valentin Huot (FRA)	France - Centre/Midi	s.t.

General classification after stage 11

Rank	Rider	Team	Time
1	Michel Vermeulin (FRA)	France - Paris/North-East	58h 35' 28"
2	Armand Desmet (BEL)	Belgium	+ 1' 17"
3	Jos Hoevenaers (BEL)	Belgium	+ 2' 22"
4	Gérard Saint (FRA)	France - West/South-West	+ 9' 48"
5	Henry Anglade (FRA)	France - Centre/Midi	+ 10' 57"
6	François Mahé (FRA)	France - West/South-West	+ 11' 24"
7	Roger Rivière (FRA)	France	+ 12' 13"
8	Ercole Baldini (ITA)	Italy	+ 13' 04"
9	Federico Bahamontes (ESP)	Spain	+ 13' 18"
10	Charly Gaul (LUX)	Netherlands/Luxembourg	+ 13' 25"
