= 1959 Tour de France, Stage 12 to Stage 22 =

Cycling race stages

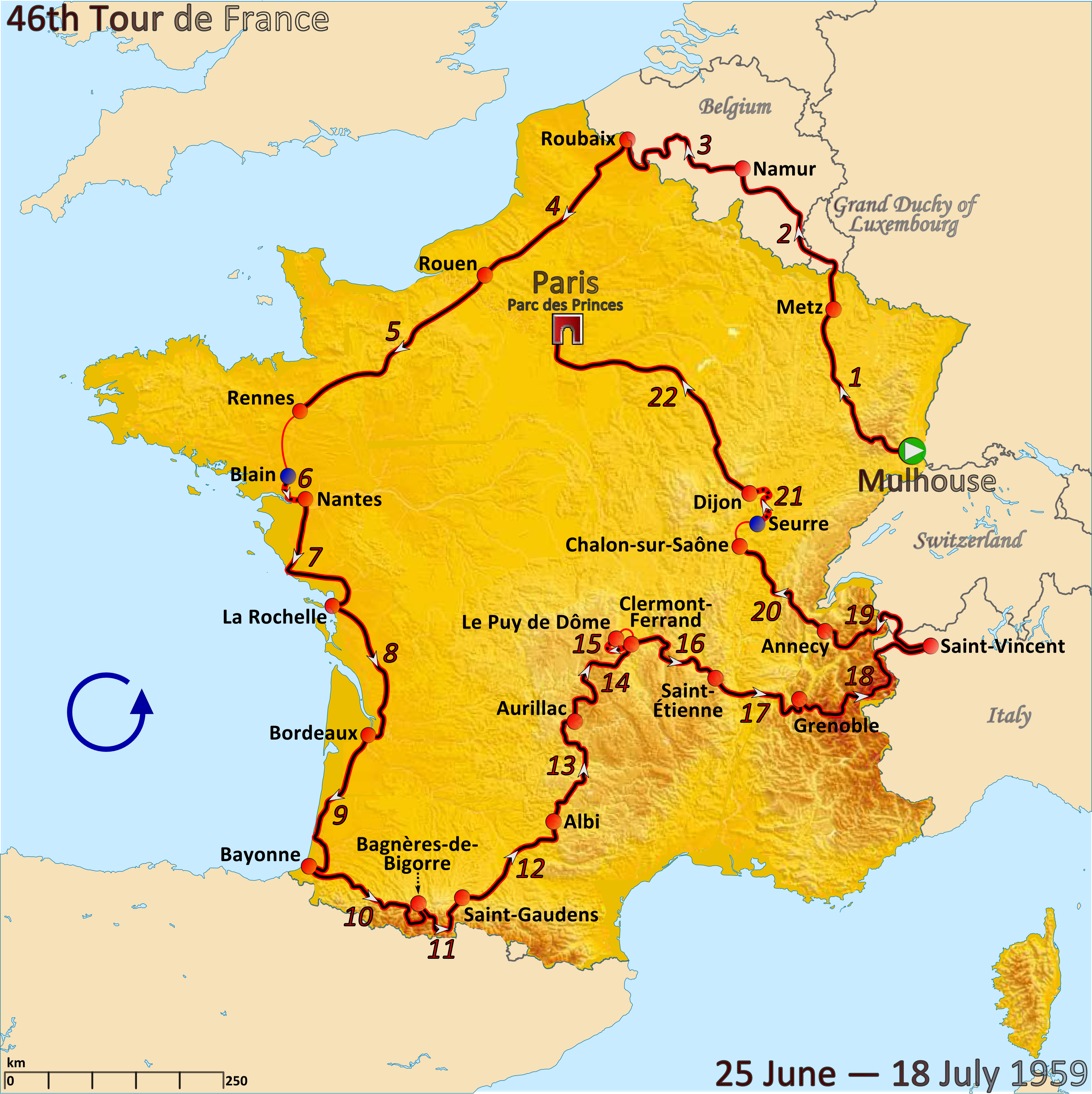
Route of the 1959 Tour de France

The 1959 Tour de France was the 46th edition of Tour de France, one of cycling's Grand Tours. The Tour began in Mulhouse with a flat stage on 25 June and Stage 12 occurred on 7 July with a flat stage from Saint-Gaudens. The race finished in Paris on 18 July.

== Stage 12 ==
7 July 1959 - Saint-Gaudens to Albi, 184 km (114.3 mi)

Stage 12 result

Rank	Rider	Team	Time
1	Rolf Graf (SUI)	Switzerland/Germany	4h 25' 36"
2	Michel Vermeulin (FRA)	France - Paris/North-East	s.t.
3	Seamus Elliott (IRL)	International	+ 46"
4	André Darrigade (FRA)	France	+ 56"
5	Tino Sabbadini (FRA)	France - West/South-West	s.t.
6	Joseph Groussard (FRA)	France - West/South-West	s.t.
7	Emanuel Plattner (SUI)	Switzerland/Germany	s.t.
8	Jean Gainche (FRA)	France - West/South-West	s.t.
9	Michel Van Aerde (BEL)	Belgium	s.t.
10	Brian Robinson (GBR)	International	s.t.

General classification after stage 12

Rank	Rider	Team	Time
1	Michel Vermeulin (FRA)	France - Paris/North-East	63h 00' 34"
2	Armand Desmet (BEL)	Belgium	+ 2' 43"
3	Jos Hoevenaers (BEL)	Belgium	+ 3' 48"
4	Gérard Saint (FRA)	France - West/South-West	+ 11' 14"
5	Henry Anglade (FRA)	France - Centre/Midi	+ 12' 23"
6	François Mahé (FRA)	France - West/South-West	+ 12' 50"
7	Roger Rivière (FRA)	France	+ 13' 39"
8	Ercole Baldini (ITA)	Italy	+ 14' 30"
9	Federico Bahamontes (ESP)	Spain	+ 14' 44"
10	Charly Gaul (LUX)	Netherlands/Luxembourg	+ 14' 51"

== Stage 13 ==
8 July 1959 - Albi to Aurillac, 219 km (136 mi)

Stage 13 result

Rank	Rider	Team	Time
1	Henry Anglade (FRA)	France - Centre/Midi	6h 12' 19"
2	Jacques Anquetil (FRA)	France	s.t.
3	Federico Bahamontes (ESP)	Spain	s.t.
4	Brian Robinson (GBR)	International	s.t.
5	Jan Adriaensens (BEL)	Belgium	+ 5"
6	François Mahé (FRA)	France - West/South-West	s.t.
7	Ercole Baldini (ITA)	Italy	+ 10"
8	Jos Hoevenaers (BEL)	Belgium	+ 3' 52"
9	Fernando Manzaneque (ESP)	Spain	s.t.
10	Louis Bergaud (FRA)	France - Centre/Midi	s.t.

General classification after stage 13

Rank	Rider	Team	Time
1	Jos Hoevenaers (BEL)	Belgium	69h 20' 33"
2	Henry Anglade (FRA)	France - Centre/Midi	+ 3' 43"
3	François Mahé (FRA)	France - West/South-West	+ 5' 15"
4	Ercole Baldini (ITA)	Italy	+ 7' 00"
5	Federico Bahamontes (ESP)	Spain	+ 7' 04"
6	Jacques Anquetil (FRA)	France	+ 7' 27"
7	Jan Adriaensens (BEL)	Belgium	+ 7' 58"
8	Roger Rivière (FRA)	France	+ 9' 51"
9	Brian Robinson (GBR)	International	+ 12' 05"
10	Eddy Pauwels (BEL)	Belgium	+ 12' 13"

== Stage 14 ==
9 July 1959 - Aurillac to Clermont-Ferrand, 231 km (144 mi)

Stage 14 result

Rank	Rider	Team	Time
1	André Le Dissez (FRA)	France - Paris/North-East	7h 03' 31"
2	Gérard Saint (FRA)	France - West/South-West	+ 14"
3	Fernand Picot (FRA)	France - West/South-West	+ 3' 02"
4	Michel Van Aerde (BEL)	Belgium	s.t.
5	Raphaël Géminiani (FRA)	France	s.t.
6	Marcel Queheille (FRA)	France - West/South-West	s.t.
7	Emmanuel Busto (FRA)	France - Centre/Midi	s.t.
8	Jean Forestier (FRA)	France - Centre/Midi	+ 3' 04"
9	Eddy Pauwels (BEL)	Belgium	+ 3' 08"
10	Stéphane Lach (FRA)	France - Paris/North-East	+ 4' 44"

General classification after stage 14

Rank	Rider	Team	Time
1	Jos Hoevenaers (BEL)	Belgium	76h 39' 16"
2	Eddy Pauwels (BEL)	Belgium	+ 9"
3	Henry Anglade (FRA)	France - Centre/Midi	+ 3' 43"
4	François Mahé (FRA)	France - West/South-West	+ 5' 15"
5	Ercole Baldini (ITA)	Italy	+ 7' 00"
6	Federico Bahamontes (ESP)	Spain	+ 7' 04"
7	Jacques Anquetil (FRA)	France	+ 7' 27"
8	Jan Adriaensens (BEL)	Belgium	+ 7' 58"
9	Roger Rivière (FRA)	France	+ 9' 51"
10	Michel Vermeulin (FRA)	France - Paris/North-East	+ 14' 41"

== Stage 15 ==
10 July 1959 - Puy de Dôme, 12 km (7.5 mi)

Stage 15 result

Rank	Rider	Team	Time
1	Federico Bahamontes (ESP)	Spain	36' 15"
2	Charly Gaul (LUX)	Netherlands/Luxembourg	+ 1' 26"
3	Henry Anglade (FRA)	France - Centre/Midi	+ 3' 00"
4	Roger Rivière (FRA)	France	+ 3' 37"
5	Jacques Anquetil (FRA)	France	+ 3' 41"
6	Jean Brankart (BEL)	Belgium	+ 3' 59"
7	Gérard Saint (FRA)	France - West/South-West	+ 4' 01"
8	Valentin Huot (FRA)	France - Centre/Midi	+ 4' 17"
9	François Mahé (FRA)	France - West/South-West	+ 4' 35"
10	Jan Adriaensens (BEL)	Belgium	+ 4' 40"

General classification after stage 15

Rank	Rider	Team	Time
1	Jos Hoevenaers (BEL)	Belgium	77h 21' 31"
2	Federico Bahamontes (ESP)	Spain	+ 4"
3	Eddy Pauwels (BEL)	Belgium	+ 40"
4	Henry Anglade (FRA)	France - Centre/Midi	+ 43"
5	François Mahé (FRA)	France - West/South-West	+ 3' 50"
6	Jacques Anquetil (FRA)	France	+ 5' 08"
7	Jan Adriaensens (BEL)	Belgium	+ 6' 38"
8	Ercole Baldini (ITA)	Italy	+ 7' 19"
9	Roger Rivière (FRA)	France	+ 7' 28"
10	Michel Vermeulin (FRA)	France - Paris/North-East	+ 15' 03"

== Stage 16 ==
11 July 1959 - Clermont-Ferrand to Saint-Étienne, 210 km (130 mi)

Stage 16 result

Rank	Rider	Team	Time
1	Dino Bruni (ITA)	Italy	6h 25' 29"
2	Rolf Graf (SUI)	Switzerland/Germany	s.t.
3	Eddy Pauwels (BEL)	Belgium	s.t.
4	Martin Van Geneugden (BEL)	Belgium	+ 36"
5	André Darrigade (FRA)	France	s.t.
6	Joseph Thomin (FRA)	France - West/South-West	s.t.
7	Gérard Saint (FRA)	France - West/South-West	s.t.
8	Marcel Rohrbach (FRA)	France - Centre/Midi	s.t.
9	Michele Gismondi (ITA)	Italy	+ 46"
10	Félix Lebuhotel (FRA)	France - West/South-West	s.t.

General classification after stage 16

Rank	Rider	Team	Time
1	Eddy Pauwels (BEL)	Belgium	83h 47' 40"
2	Jos Hoevenaers (BEL)	Belgium	+ 6"
3	Federico Bahamontes (ESP)	Spain	+ 10"
4	Henry Anglade (FRA)	France - Centre/Midi	+ 49"
5	François Mahé (FRA)	France - West/South-West	+ 3' 56"
6	Jacques Anquetil (FRA)	France	+ 5' 14"
7	Jan Adriaensens (BEL)	Belgium	+ 6' 44"
8	Ercole Baldini (ITA)	Italy	+ 7' 25"
9	Roger Rivière (FRA)	France	+ 7' 34"
10	Michel Vermeulin (FRA)	France - Paris/North-East	+ 15' 09"

== Rest Day 2 ==
12 July 1959 - Saint-Étienne

== Stage 17 ==
13 July 1959 - Saint-Étienne to Grenoble, 197 km (122 mi)

Stage 17 result

Rank	Rider	Team	Time
1	Charly Gaul (LUX)	Netherlands/Luxembourg	5h 37' 16"
2	Federico Bahamontes (ESP)	Spain	s.t.
3	Jean Graczyk (FRA)	France	+ 3' 33"
4	André Darrigade (FRA)	France	+ 3' 42"
5	Piet Damen (NED)	Netherlands/Luxembourg	s.t.
6	Michel Van Aerde (BEL)	Belgium	s.t.
7	Arigo Padovan (ITA)	Italy	s.t.
8	Joseph Thomin (FRA)	France - West/South-West	s.t.
9	Joseph Groussard (FRA)	France - West/South-West	s.t.
10	Marcel Ernzer (LUX)	Netherlands/Luxembourg	s.t.

General classification after stage 17

Rank	Rider	Team	Time
1	Federico Bahamontes (ESP)	Spain	89h 24' 36"
2	Eddy Pauwels (BEL)	Belgium	+ 4' 02"
3	Jos Hoevenaers (BEL)	Belgium	+ 4' 08"
4	Henry Anglade (FRA)	France - Centre/Midi	+ 4' 51"
5	François Mahé (FRA)	France - West/South-West	+ 7' 58"
6	Jacques Anquetil (FRA)	France	+ 9' 16"
7	Jan Adriaensens (BEL)	Belgium	+ 10' 46"
8	Ercole Baldini (ITA)	Italy	+ 11' 27"
9	Roger Rivière (FRA)	France	+ 11' 36"
10	Michel Vermeulin (FRA)	France - Paris/North-East	+ 19' 11"

== Stage 18 ==
14 July 1959 - Grenoble to Saint-Vincent, 243 km (151 mi)

Stage 18 result

Rank	Rider	Team	Time
1	Ercole Baldini (ITA)	Italy	7h 48' 43"
2	Charly Gaul (LUX)	Netherlands/Luxembourg	s.t.
3	Jean Graczyk (FRA)	France	s.t.
4	Henry Anglade (FRA)	France - Centre/Midi	s.t.
5	Michele Gismondi (ITA)	Italy	s.t.
6	Adolf Christian (AUT)	International	s.t.
7	Brian Robinson (GBR)	International	+ 47"
8	Jacques Anquetil (FRA)	France	s.t.
9	Jean Brankart (BEL)	Belgium	s.t.
10	Roger Rivière (FRA)	France	s.t.

General classification after stage 18

Rank	Rider	Team	Time
1	Federico Bahamontes (ESP)	Spain	97h 14' 06"
2	Henry Anglade (FRA)	France - Centre/Midi	+ 4' 04"
3	François Mahé (FRA)	France - West/South-West	+ 7' 58"
4	Jacques Anquetil (FRA)	France	+ 9' 16"
5	Ercole Baldini (ITA)	Italy	+ 9' 40"
6	Jos Hoevenaers (BEL)	Belgium	+ 10' 30"
7	Jan Adriaensens (BEL)	Belgium	+ 10' 46"
8	Roger Rivière (FRA)	France	+ 11' 36"
9	Eddy Pauwels (BEL)	Belgium	+ 19' 04"
10	Charly Gaul (LUX)	Netherlands/Luxembourg	+ 21' 26"

== Stage 19 ==
15 July 1959 - Saint-Vincent to Annecy, 251 km (156 mi)

Stage 19 result

Rank	Rider	Team	Time
1	Rolf Graf (SUI)	Switzerland/Germany	8h 33' 31"
2	Gérard Saint (FRA)	France - West/South-West	+ 4' 15"
3	Charly Gaul (LUX)	Netherlands/Luxembourg	+ 4' 54"
4	Federico Bahamontes (ESP)	Spain	s.t.
5	Jean Brankart (BEL)	Belgium	+ 5' 52"
6	Piet Damen (NED)	Netherlands/Luxembourg	s.t.
7	Eddy Pauwels (BEL)	Belgium	s.t.
8	Jos Hoevenaers (BEL)	Belgium	s.t.
9	François Mahé (FRA)	France - West/South-West	s.t.
10	Jacques Anquetil (FRA)	France	s.t.

General classification after stage 19

Rank	Rider	Team	Time
1	Federico Bahamontes (ESP)	Spain	105h 52' 31"
2	Henry Anglade (FRA)	France - Centre/Midi	+ 5' 40"
3	François Mahé (FRA)	France - West/South-West	+ 8' 56"
4	Jacques Anquetil (FRA)	France	+ 10' 14"
5	Ercole Baldini (ITA)	Italy	+ 11' 16"
6	Jos Hoevenaers (BEL)	Belgium	+ 11' 28"
7	Jan Adriaensens (BEL)	Belgium	+ 11' 44"
8	Roger Rivière (FRA)	France	+ 12' 34"
9	Eddy Pauwels (BEL)	Belgium	+ 20' 02"
10	Gérard Saint (FRA)	France - West/South-West	+ 20' 19"

== Stage 20 ==
16 July 1959 - Annecy to Chalon-sur-Saône, 202 km (126 mi)

Stage 20 result

Rank	Rider	Team	Time
1	Brian Robinson (GBR)	International	5h 52' 21"
2	Arigo Padovan (ITA)	Italy	+ 20' 06"
3	André Darrigade (FRA)	France	s.t.
4	Robert Cazala (FRA)	France	s.t.
5	Martin Van Geneugden (BEL)	Belgium	s.t.
6	Félix Lebuhotel (FRA)	France - West/South-West	s.t.
7	Michel Van Aerde (BEL)	Belgium	s.t.
8	Jacques Anquetil (FRA)	France	s.t.
9	Kamiel Buysse (BEL)	Belgium	s.t.
10	Piet Damen (NED)	Netherlands/Luxembourg	s.t.

General classification after stage 20

Rank	Rider	Team	Time
1	Federico Bahamontes (ESP)	Spain	112h 04' 58"
2	Henry Anglade (FRA)	France - Centre/Midi	+ 5' 40"
3	François Mahé (FRA)	France - West/South-West	+ 8' 56"
4	Jacques Anquetil (FRA)	France	+ 10' 14"
5	Ercole Baldini (ITA)	Italy	+ 11' 16"
6	Jos Hoevenaers (BEL)	Belgium	+ 11' 28"
7	Jan Adriaensens (BEL)	Belgium	+ 11' 44"
8	Roger Rivière (FRA)	France	+ 12' 34"
9	Eddy Pauwels (BEL)	Belgium	+ 20' 02"
10	Gérard Saint (FRA)	France - West/South-West	+ 20' 19"

== Stage 21 ==
17 July 1959 - Seurre to Dijon, 69 km (43 mi) (ITT)

Stage 21 result

Rank	Rider	Team	Time
1	Roger Rivière (FRA)	France	1h 39' 38"
2	Jacques Anquetil (FRA)	France	+ 1' 38"
3	Gérard Saint (FRA)	France - West/South-West	+ 3' 38"
4	Jean Brankart (BEL)	Belgium	+ 3' 57"
5	Henry Anglade (FRA)	France - Centre/Midi	+ 4' 38"
6	Jan Adriaensens (BEL)	Belgium	+ 4' 51"
7	Ercole Baldini (ITA)	Italy	+ 5' 19"
8	François Mahé (FRA)	France - West/South-West	+ 5' 43"
9	Jos Hoevenaers (BEL)	Belgium	+ 5' 51"
10	Fred De Bruyne (BEL)	Belgium	+ 5' 55"

General classification after stage 21

Rank	Rider	Team	Time
1	Federico Bahamontes (ESP)	Spain	113h 50' 53"
2	Henry Anglade (FRA)	France - Centre/Midi	+ 4' 01"
3	Jacques Anquetil (FRA)	France	+ 5' 05"
4	Roger Rivière (FRA)	France	+ 5' 17"
5	François Mahé (FRA)	France - West/South-West	+ 8' 22"
6	Ercole Baldini (ITA)	Italy	+ 10' 18"
7	Jan Adriaensens (BEL)	Belgium	s.t.
8	Jos Hoevenaers (BEL)	Belgium	+ 11' 02"
9	Gérard Saint (FRA)	France - West/South-West	+ 17' 40"
10	Jean Brankart (BEL)	Belgium	+ 20' 38"

== Stage 22 ==
18 July 1959 - Dijon to Paris, 331 km (206 mi)

Stage 22 result

Rank	Rider	Team	Time
1	Joseph Groussard (FRA)	France - West/South-West	9h 55' 52"
2	Arigo Padovan (ITA)	Italy	s.t.
3	Dino Bruni (ITA)	Italy	s.t.
4	Jos Hoevenaers (BEL)	Belgium	s.t.
5	André Darrigade (FRA)	France	s.t.
6	Michel Van Aerde (BEL)	Belgium	s.t.
7	Martin Van Geneugden (BEL)	Belgium	s.t.
8	Marcel Ernzer (LUX)	Netherlands/Luxembourg	s.t.
9	Kamiel Buysse (BEL)	Belgium	s.t.
10	Fernand Picot (FRA)	France - West/South-West	s.t.

General classification after stage 22

Rank	Rider	Team	Time
1	Federico Bahamontes (ESP)	Spain	123h 46' 45"
2	Henry Anglade (FRA)	France - Centre/Midi	+ 4' 01"
3	Jacques Anquetil (FRA)	France	+ 5' 05"
4	Roger Rivière (FRA)	France	+ 5' 17"
5	François Mahé (FRA)	France - West/South-West	+ 8' 22"
6	Ercole Baldini (ITA)	Italy	+ 10' 18"
7	Jan Adriaensens (BEL)	Belgium	s.t.
8	Jos Hoevenaers (BEL)	Belgium	+ 11' 02"
9	Gérard Saint (FRA)	France - West/South-West	+ 17' 40"
10	Jean Brankart (BEL)	Belgium	+ 20' 38"
