= Route de France =

Former road cycling race

Race details
- Region: France
- Discipline: Road
- Type: Stage race

History
- First edition: 1951
- Editions: 40
- Final edition: 1990
- First winner: Jacques Vivier (FRA)
- Most wins: Raymond Mastrotto (FRA); Régis Ovion (BEL); (2 wins)
- Final winner: Jean-Philippe Dojwa (FRA)

The Route de France was a multi-day road cycling race held in France between 1951 and 1990. The race was considered an amateur version of the Tour de France and competed with the Tour de l'Avenir after its creation in 1961. Its route traveled through Auvergne, around Vichy, and climbed in particular the Puy de Dôme. It was organized by the newspaper Route et piste, directed by Jean Leulliot, which also organized at the time Paris–Nice and the Étoile des Espoirs.

== Winners ==
Year	Winner	Second	Third
1951	(France) Jacques Vivier	(France) Marcel Bon	(France) René Volet
1952	(France) André Bernard	(France) Roger Julienne	(Belgium) Jean Adriaensens
1953	(France) Louis Barès	(Belgium) René Desmet	(France) Blaise Bertolotti
1954	(France) Nicolas Barone	(France) Orphée Meneghini	(Belgium) Willem Vandenbosch
1955	(France) René Genin	(France) Gérard Saint	(France) Pierre Beuffeuil
1956	(France) Raymond Mastrotto	(France) Marcel Queheille	(France) Michel Vermeulin
1957	(France) Raymond Mastrotto	(France) Michel Vermeulin	(France) Robert Roudaut
1958	(France) Guy Ignolin	(France) René Jousset	(France) Gérard Thiélin
1959	(France) Henri Duez	(France) Jean Bonifassi	(France) Gérard Bauman
1960	(France) Marc Huiart	(France) Jean-Claude Lebaube	(France) Jean-Claude Morio
1961	(France) Jean Jourden	(France) Alban Cauvet	(France) Marcel Flochlay
1962	(Republic of Ireland) Peter Crinnion	(France) André Grain	(France) Blaise Gallo
1963	(France) Lucien Aimar	(France) Georges Chappe	(France) Raymond Delisle
1964	(France) Christian Raymond	(France) Charles Rigon	(France) Désiré Letort
1965	(France) Charly Grosskost	(France) Jean Dumont	(France) Maurice Izier
1966	(France) Paul Maes	(United Kingdom) Derek Harrison	(France) Robert Bouloux
1967	(United Kingdom) Derek Harrison	(France) René Grelin	(France) Daniel Samy
1968	(France) Jean Pinault	(France) Marcel Duchemin	(France) Mariano Martínez
1969	(France) Jean-Pierre Parenteau	(France) Max Heuzebroc	(France) Joël Millard
1970	(France) Régis Ovion	(France) Paul Ravel	(France) Pierre Rivory
1971	(France) Régis Ovion	(France) Claude Aigueparses	(France) Michel Le Denmat
1972	(France) Jean-Pierre Guitard	(France) Daniel Leveau	(France) Patrice Testier
1973	(France) Bernard Bourreau	(France) Michel Charlier	(France) Michel Jacquier
1974	(France) Michel Laurent	(France) Bernard Hinault	(France) Bernard Vallet
1975	(France) Bernard Vallet	(France) Alain Meslet	(France) Bernard Quilfen
1976	(France) Michel Herbault	(France) Philippe Bodier	(France) Michel Zuccarelli
1977	(France) Loïc Gautier	(France) Jean-Pierre Bouteille	(France) Joël Gallopin
1978	(France) Didier Lebaud	(United Kingdom) Graham Jones	(France) Michel Larpe
1979	(United Kingdom) Robert Millar	(France) Régis Clère	(Socialist Federal Republic of Yugoslavia) Loubé Blagojevic
1980	(France) Jérôme Simon	(Republic of Ireland) Stephen Roche	(France) Pierre Le Bigaut
1981	(France) Étienne Néant	(France) Fabien De Vooght	(France) Daniel André
1982	(France) Gilles Mas	(France) Pascal Trimaille	(France) Gilbert Lagarde
1983	(France) Robert Forest	(France) Michel Jean	(France) Bernard Faussurier
1984	(France) Bruno Huger	(France) Ronan Pensec	(France) Serge Bodin
1985	(France) Jean Guérin	(France) Pascal Rouquette	(France) Philippe Goubin
1988	(France) Hervé Henriet	(France) Gérard Picard	(France) Nicolas Dubois
1989	(France) Marc Thévenin	(France) Franck Simon	(France) Jean-Luc Aulnette
1990	(France) Jean-Philippe Dojwa	(France) Pascal Berger	(France) Jean-Cyril Robin
