= Combativity award in the Tour de France =

Prize given in the Tour de France

Combativity award
- Sport: Road bicycle racing
- Competition: Tour de France
- Awarded for: Most aggressive rider
- Local name: Le Prix de la combativité (French)

History
- First award: 1952
- Editions: 75 known (as of 2026)
- First winner: Wout Wagtmans (NED)
- Most wins: Eddy Merckx (BEL) 4 times
- Most recent: Richard Carapaz (ECU)

The combativity award is a prize given in the Tour de France for the most combative rider overall during the race. Historically, it favored constant attackers as it was based on the distance spent in a breakaway, included winning checkpoints and outright stage wins. Today, the winner is chosen by a jury. Besides the overall winner, the jury also awards a combativity award to the most aggressive rider at the end of each stage, with this rider allowed to wear a golden number the following race day.

The 1981 Tour de France marked the last time the winner of the general classification also won the combativity award.

== History ==
Since 1952, after every stage the most combative cyclist was given an award, and an overall competition was recorded. At the end of the 1956 Tour de France, André Darrigade was named the most attacking cyclist. At this point, the award was given the same importance as the award for the cyclist with the most bad luck, Picot in 1956.

In 1961, the award was not given to an individual cyclist, but to the entire West-South-West regional team.

The system of the award has changed over the years. Historically, riders accumulated points, and the cyclist with the most points at the end of the Tour was declared the winner. The cyclist did not have to finish the race; for example, in 1971, Luis Ocaña crashed out while wearing the yellow jersey on the Col de Menté in stage 14, and in 1972, Cyrille Guimard wore the green jersey in second place overall when he withdrew, but both were still given the combativity award.

In 1979, the combativity award was initially given to Joop Zoetemelk; however, Hennie Kuiper received the final award.

In a system that was implemented in 2003, a jury of eight specialists in cycling selected the most combative cyclist of each stage (excluding time trials), with the classification for most distance in breakaway groups only part of the decision.

There is no jersey for the most combative rider of the previous stage, but he can be recognized by the race number worn on his back: it consists of a black number on a golden background instead of the usual black on white. From 1998 until 2022, it consisted of a white number on a red background.

At the end of the Tour de France, a "super-combativity award" is given to the most combative cyclist of the race. As of 2017, the total prize money for the super-combativity award winner is €20,000.

From 2023, the number is golden, following sponsorship by real estate company Century 21.

== Winners ==
Overall super-combativity award winners since 1953.

Year	Country	Rider	Team
1953	Netherlands	Wout Wagtmans	Netherlands
1954	France	Lucien Lazaridès (victory shared with François Mahé)	France South-East
1954	France	François Mahé (victory shared with Lucien Lazaridès)	France West
1955	Luxembourg	Charly Gaul	Luxembourg/Mixed
1956	France	André Darrigade	France
1957	France	Nicolas Barone	France Île-de-France
1958	Spain	Federico Bahamontes	Spain
1959	France	Gérard Saint	France West South-West
1960	France	Jean Graczyk	France
1961	France	Team award	France West South-West
1962	Belgium	Eddy Pauwels	Wiel's–Groene Leeuw
1963	Belgium	Rik Van Looy	G.B.C.–Gramaglia
1964	France	Henry Anglade	Pelforth–Sauvage–Lejeune
1965	Italy	Felice Gimondi	Salvarani
1966	West Germany	Rudi Altig	Molteni
1967	France	Désiré Letort	France
1968	France	Roger Pingeon	France A
1969	Belgium	Eddy Merckx	Faema
1970	Belgium	Eddy Merckx	Faemino–Faema
1971	Spain	Luis Ocaña	Bic
1972	France	Cyrille Guimard	Gan–Mercier–Hutchinson
1973	Spain	Luis Ocaña	Bic
1974	Belgium	Eddy Merckx	Molteni
1975	Belgium	Eddy Merckx	Molteni–RYC
1976	France	Raymond Delisle	Peugeot–Esso–Michelin
1977	Netherlands	Gerrie Knetemann	TI–Raleigh
1978	Belgium	Paul Wellens	TI–Raleigh–McGregor
1979	Netherlands	Hennie Kuiper (Note: Initially won by Joop Zoetemelk, award revoked after race due to doping penalty on Champs Elysees stage (see 1979 Tour de France)	TI–Raleigh–McGregor
1980	France	Christian Levavasseur	Miko–Mercier–Vivagel
1981	France	Bernard Hinault	Renault–Elf–Gitane
1982	France	Régis Clère	COOP–Mercier–Mavic
1983	Switzerland	Serge Demierre	Cilo–Aufina
1984	France	Bernard Hinault	La Vie Claire
1985	Netherlands	Maarten Ducrot	Lotto
1986	France	Bernard Hinault	La Vie Claire
1987	France	Régis Clère	Teka
1988	France	Jérôme Simon	Z–Peugeot
1989	France	Laurent Fignon	Super U–Raleigh–Fiat
1990	Spain	Eduardo Chozas	ONCE
1991	Italy	Claudio Chiappucci	Carrera Jeans–Tassoni
1992	Italy	Claudio Chiappucci	Carrera Jeans–Vagabond
1993	Italy	Massimo Ghirotto	ZG Mobili
1994	Italy	Eros Poli	Mercatone Uno–Medeghini
1995	Colombia	Hernán Buenahora	Kelme–Sureña
1996	France	Richard Virenque	Festina–Lotus
1997	France	Richard Virenque	Festina–Lotus
1998	France	Jacky Durand	Casino–Ag2r
1999	France	Jacky Durand	Lotto–Mobistar
2000	Netherlands	Erik Dekker	Rabobank
2001	France	Laurent Jalabert	CSC–Tiscali
2002	France	Laurent Jalabert	CSC–Tiscali
2003	Kazakhstan	Alexander Vinokourov	Team Telekom
2004	France	Richard Virenque	Quick-Step–Davitamon
2005	Spain	Óscar Pereiro	Phonak
2006	Spain	David de la Fuente	Saunier Duval–Prodir
2007	Spain	Amets Txurruka	Euskaltel–Euskadi
2008	France	Sylvain Chavanel	Cofidis
2009	No winner (Note: In March 2011, Franco Pellizotti's results were removed after the Court of Arbitration for Sport found his biological passport indicated irregular values. The classification standings were not altered.)		
2010	France	Sylvain Chavanel	Quick-Step
2011	France	Jérémy Roy	FDJ
2012	Denmark	Chris Anker Sørensen	Saxo Bank–Tinkoff Bank
2013	France	Christophe Riblon	Ag2r–La Mondiale
2014	Italy	Alessandro De Marchi	Cannondale
2015	France	Romain Bardet	AG2R La Mondiale
2016	Slovakia	Peter Sagan	Tinkoff
2017	France	Warren Barguil	Team Sunweb
2018	Ireland	Dan Martin	UAE Team Emirates
2019	France	Julian Alaphilippe	Deceuninck–Quick-Step
2020	Switzerland	Marc Hirschi	Team Sunweb
2021	France	Franck Bonnamour	B&B Hotels p/b KTM
2022	Belgium	Wout van Aert	Team Jumbo–Visma
2023	Belgium	Victor Campenaerts	Lotto–Dstny
2024	Ecuador	Richard Carapaz	EF Education–EasyPost
2025	Ireland	Ben Healy	EF Education–EasyPost
2026	Ecuador	Richard Carapaz	EF Education–EasyPost
