= Ommer =

Ommer is a German surname. Notable people with the surname include:

- Manfred Ommer (1950–2021), German sprinter
- Winfried Ommer (born 1937), German cyclist
- Uwe Ommer (born 1943), German photographer
