= Bent Ole Retvig =

Danish cyclist

Personal information
- Born: 15 May 1936 Nakskov, Denmark
- Died: 15 August 2004 (aged 68)

Cycling career
- Sport: Cycling
- Role: Rider

Bent Ole Retvig (15 May 1936 – 15 August 2004) was a Danish professional racing cyclist. He rode in the 1959 and 1960 Tour de France.
