= Richard Durlacher =

Austrian cyclist

Personal information
- Born: 6 June 1932 (age 94)

Cycling career
- Sport: Cycling
- Role: Rider

Richard Durlacher (born 6 June 1932) is an Austrian racing cyclist. He rode in the 1959 Tour de France.
