= Jacques Champion (cyclist) =

French cyclist

Personal information
- Born: 4 September 1934
- Died: 21 August 1990 (aged 55)

Cycling career
- Sport: Cycling
- Role: Rider

Jacques Champion (4 September 1934 – 21 August 1990) was a French racing cyclist. He rode in the 1959 Tour de France.
