= Jaroszewicz =

Jaroszewicz is a Polish surname. Notable people with the surname include:

- Hans Jaroszewicz (1935–2003), German cyclist
- Paweł Jaroszewicz (born 1985), Polish drummer
- Piotr Jaroszewicz (1909–1992), Polish politician
