= Jean Hoffmann =

French cyclist (born 1934)

Personal information
- Born: 24 July 1934 (age 92)

Cycling career
- Sport: Cycling
- Role: Rider

Jean Hoffmann (born 24 July 1934) is a French racing cyclist. He rode in the 1959 Tour de France.
