= Louis Bisilliat =

French cyclist

Personal information
- Full name: Louis Bisilliat
- Born: 25 February 1931 Ugine, France
- Died: 2 May 2010 (aged 79) Ugine, France

Cycling career
- Sport: Cycling
- Role: Rider

Louis Bisilliat (25 February 1931 – 5 May 2010) was a French racing cyclist. He finished in last place in the 1959 Tour de France.
