= Bram Kool =

Dutch cyclist

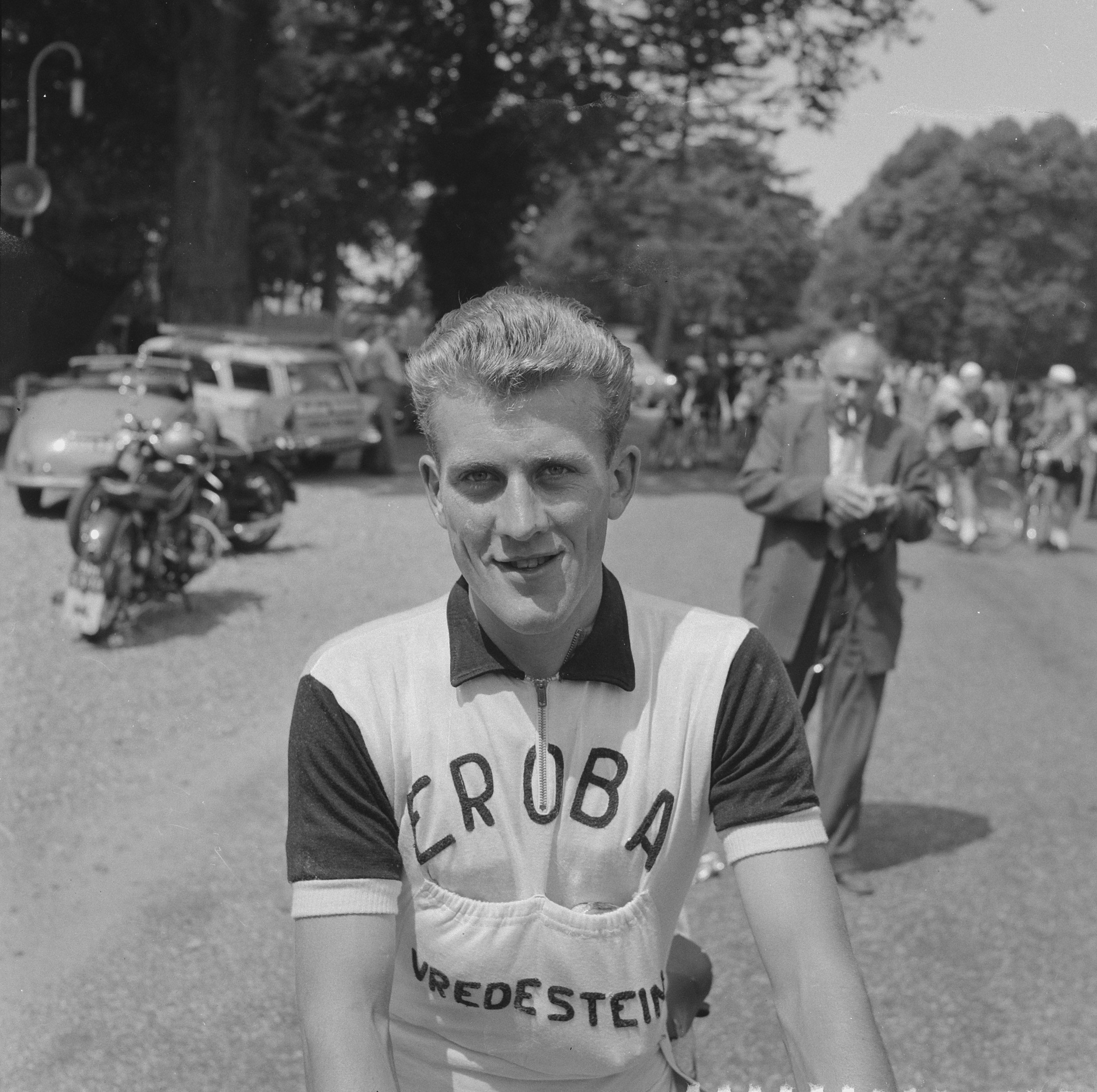

Personal information
- Born: 10 June 1937
- Died: 11 June 1990 (aged 53)

Cycling career
- Sport: Cycling
- Role: Rider

Bram Kool (10 June 1937 – 11 June 1990) was a Dutch racing cyclist. He rode in the 1959 Tour de France.
