= Winfried Ommer =

German cyclist (born 1937)

Personal information
- Born: 6 January 1937 (age 89)

Cycling career
- Sport: Cycling
- Role: Rider

Winfried Ommer (born 6 January 1937) is a German racing cyclist. He rode in the 1959 Tour de France.
