= John Andrews (cyclist) =

British cyclist

Personal information
- Born: 13 April 1934 Ramsgate, England
- Died: 23 March 2000 (aged 65) Woking, England

Cycling career
- Sport: Cycling
- Role: Rider

John Andrews (13 April 1934 – 23 March 2000) was a British professional racing cyclist. He rode in the 1960 Tour de France.
