= Sauguis-Saint-Étienne =

Sauguis-Saint-Étienne Zalgize-Doneztebe (Basque)
- Commune
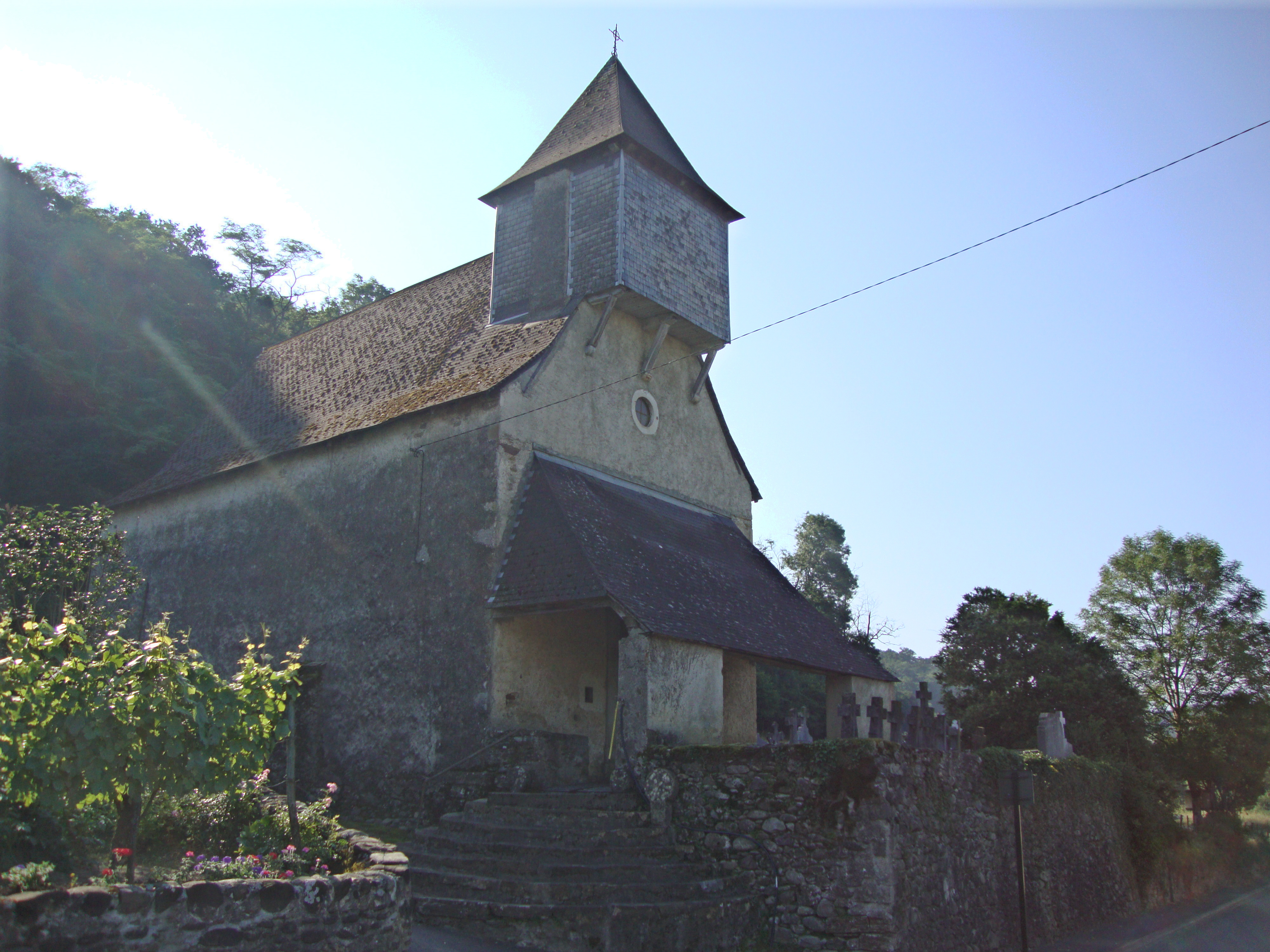
- The church of Saint-Étienne
- Location of Sauguis-Saint-Étienne
- Location within France Location within Nouvelle-Aquitaine
- Coordinates: 43°09′10″N 0°53′12″W
- Country: France
- Region: Nouvelle-Aquitaine
- Department: Pyrénées-Atlantiques
- Arrondissement: Oloron-Sainte-Marie
- Canton: Montagne Basque
- Intercommunality: CA Pays Basque

Government
  - Mayor (2020–2026): Pierre Arrossagaray
- Area^{1}: 8.81 km^{2} (3.40 sq mi)
- Elevation: 264 m (866 ft)
- Highest elevation: 728 m (2,388 ft)
- Lowest elevation: 175 m (574 ft)
- Population (2023): 172
  - Density: 19.5/km^{2} (50.6/sq mi)
- Time zone: UTC+01:00 (CET)
  - Summer (DST): UTC+02:00 (CEST)
- INSEE/Postal code: 64509 /64470
- ^{1} French Land Register data, which excludes lakes, ponds, glaciers > 1 km^{2} (0.386 sq mi or 247 acres) and river estuaries.

Sauguis-Saint-Étienne (Occitan: Sap-Sant Estève; Basque: Zalgize-Doneztebe) is a commune in the Pyrénées-Atlantiques department in south-western France.

It is located in the former province of Soule.

== See also ==
- Communes of the Pyrénées-Atlantiques department
