= Thadeus Wierucki =

Belgian cyclist

Personal information
- Born: 23 December 1934 Liège, Belgium
- Died: 8 March 2015 (aged 80) Liège, Belgium

Cycling career
- Sport: Cycling
- Role: Rider

Thadeus Wierucki (23 December 1934 – 8 March 2015) was a Belgian professional racing cyclist. He rode in the 1959 and the 1960 Tour de France.
