= Otto Altweck =

German cyclist (1937–2025)

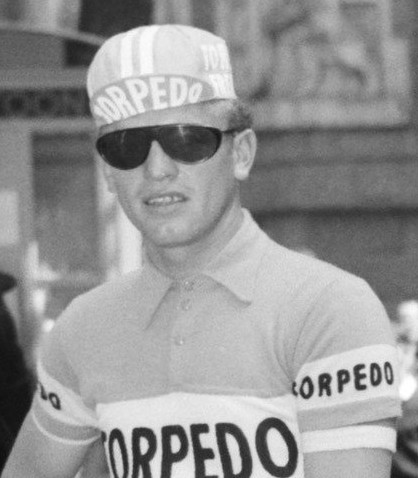
- Altweck in 1960

Personal information
- Born: 28 March 1937 Munich, Gau Munich-Upper Bavaria, Germany
- Died: 9 August 2025 (aged 88)

Cycling career
- Sport: Cycling
- Role: Rider

Otto Altweck (German: [ˈɔtoː ˈaltvɛk]; 28 March 1937 – 9 August 2025) was a German racing cyclist. He rode in the 1959 Tour de France. Altweck died in August 2025, at the age of 88.
