= Arne Jonsson =

Danish cyclist

Personal information
- Born: 28 November 1931 (age 94)

Cycling career
- Sport: Cycling
- Role: Rider

Arne Jonsson (born 28 November 1931) is a Danish racing cyclist. He rode in the 1959 Tour de France.
