= Nello Fabbri =

Italian cyclist (1934–2020)

Personal information
- Born: 15 March 1934 Rome, Italy
- Died: 30 January 2020 (aged 85) Rome, Italy

Cycling career
- Sport: Cycling
- Role: Rider

Nello Fabbri (15 March 1934 – 30 January 2020) was an Italian professional racing cyclist. He rode in the 1959 and 1960 Tour de France.
