= Victor Sutton =

British cyclist

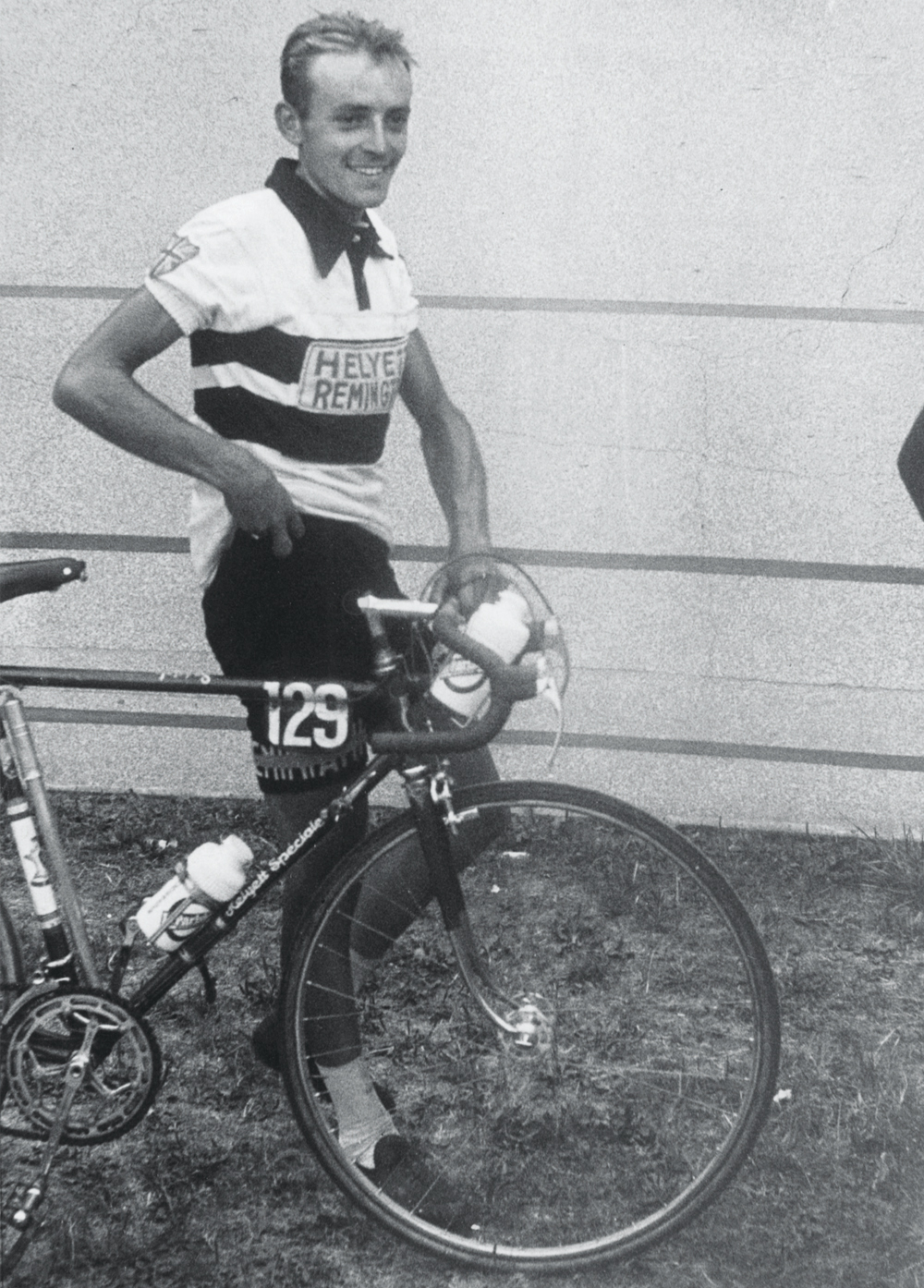

Personal information
- Born: 3 December 1935 Thorne, West Riding of Yorkshire, England
- Died: 29 July 1999 (aged 63) Little Weighton, England

Cycling career
- Sport: Cycling
- Role: Rider

Victor Sutton (3 December 1935 – 29 July 1999) was a British professional racing cyclist. He rode in the 1959 & 1960 Tour de France.
