= Orphée Meneghini =

French cyclist

Personal information
- Born: 28 June 1934 (age 92)

Cycling career
- Sport: Cycling
- Role: Rider

Orphée Meneghini (born 28 June 1934) is a French racing cyclist. He rode in the 1959 Tour de France.
