= Seurre =

- Commune
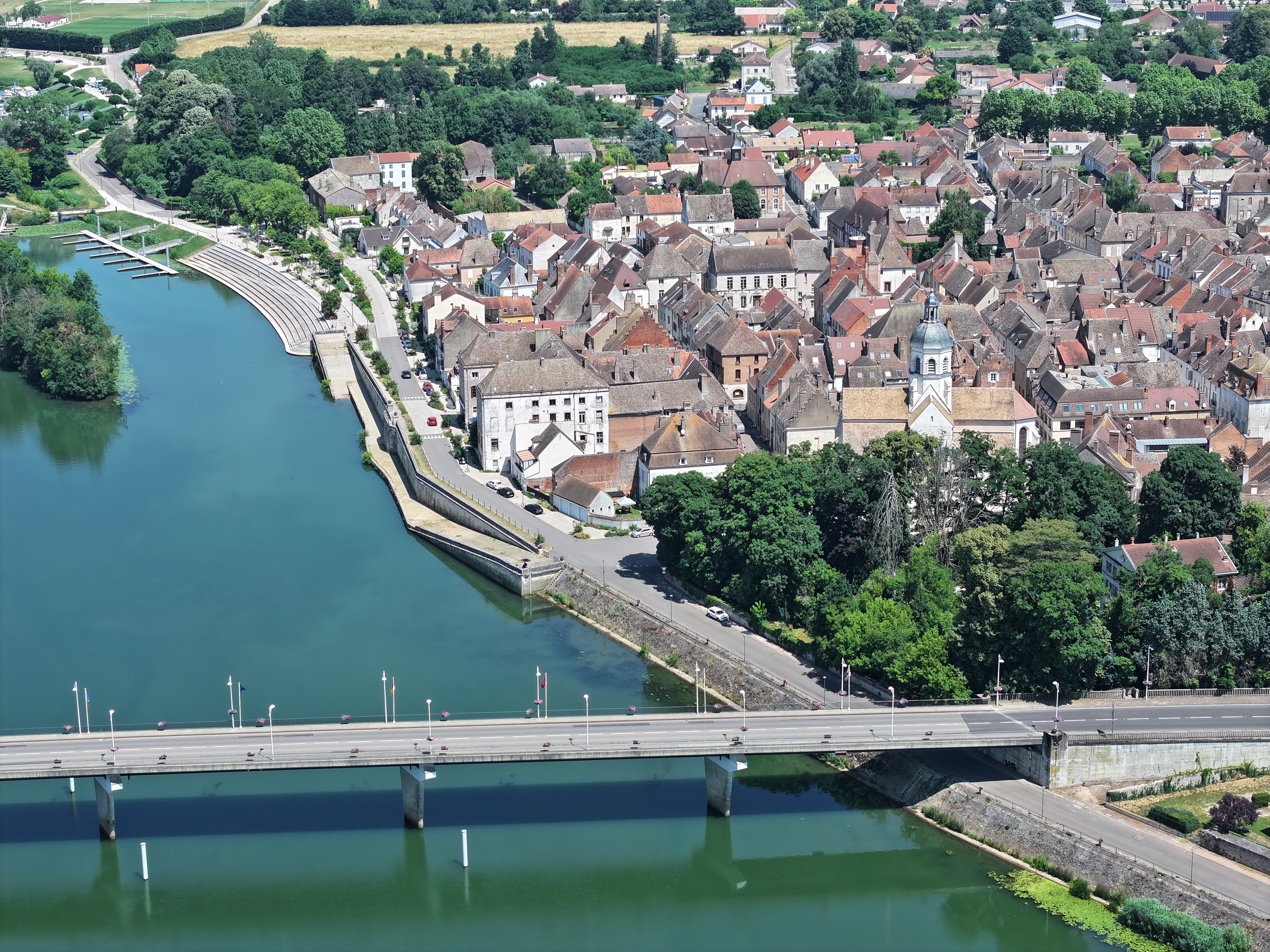
- 14th-century Saint-Martin Church and Saône River

- Coat of arms
- Location of Seurre
- Location within France Location within Bourgogne-Franche-Comté
- Coordinates: 46°59′57″N 5°08′51″E
- Country: France
- Region: Bourgogne-Franche-Comté
- Department: Côte-d'Or
- Arrondissement: Beaune
- Canton: Brazey-en-Plaine
- Intercommunality: Rives de Saône

Government
  - Mayor (2020–2026): Alain Becquet
- Area^{1}: 8.99 km^{2} (3.47 sq mi)
- Elevation: 181 m (594 ft)
- Highest elevation: 192 m (630 ft)
- Lowest elevation: 176 m (577 ft)
- Population (2023): 2,352
  - Density: 262/km^{2} (678/sq mi)
- Time zone: UTC+01:00 (CET)
  - Summer (DST): UTC+02:00 (CEST)
- INSEE/Postal code: 21607 /21250
- ^{1} French Land Register data, which excludes lakes, ponds, glaciers > 1 km^{2} (0.386 sq mi or 247 acres) and river estuaries.

Seurre (French pronunciation: [sœʁ]) is a commune in the Côte-d'Or department in eastern France.

This commune lies at the crossroads of routes to Dijon, Chalon-sur-Saône, Dole, Beaune, and Louhans.

== Population ==
Historical population
Year	Pop.	±% p.a.
1968	2,683	—
1975	2,822	+0.72%
1982	2,694	−0.66%
1990	2,728	+0.16%
1999	2,666	−0.26%
2007	2,473	−0.93%
2012	2,436	−0.30%
2017	2,353	−0.69%
2023	2,352	−0.01%
Source: INSEE

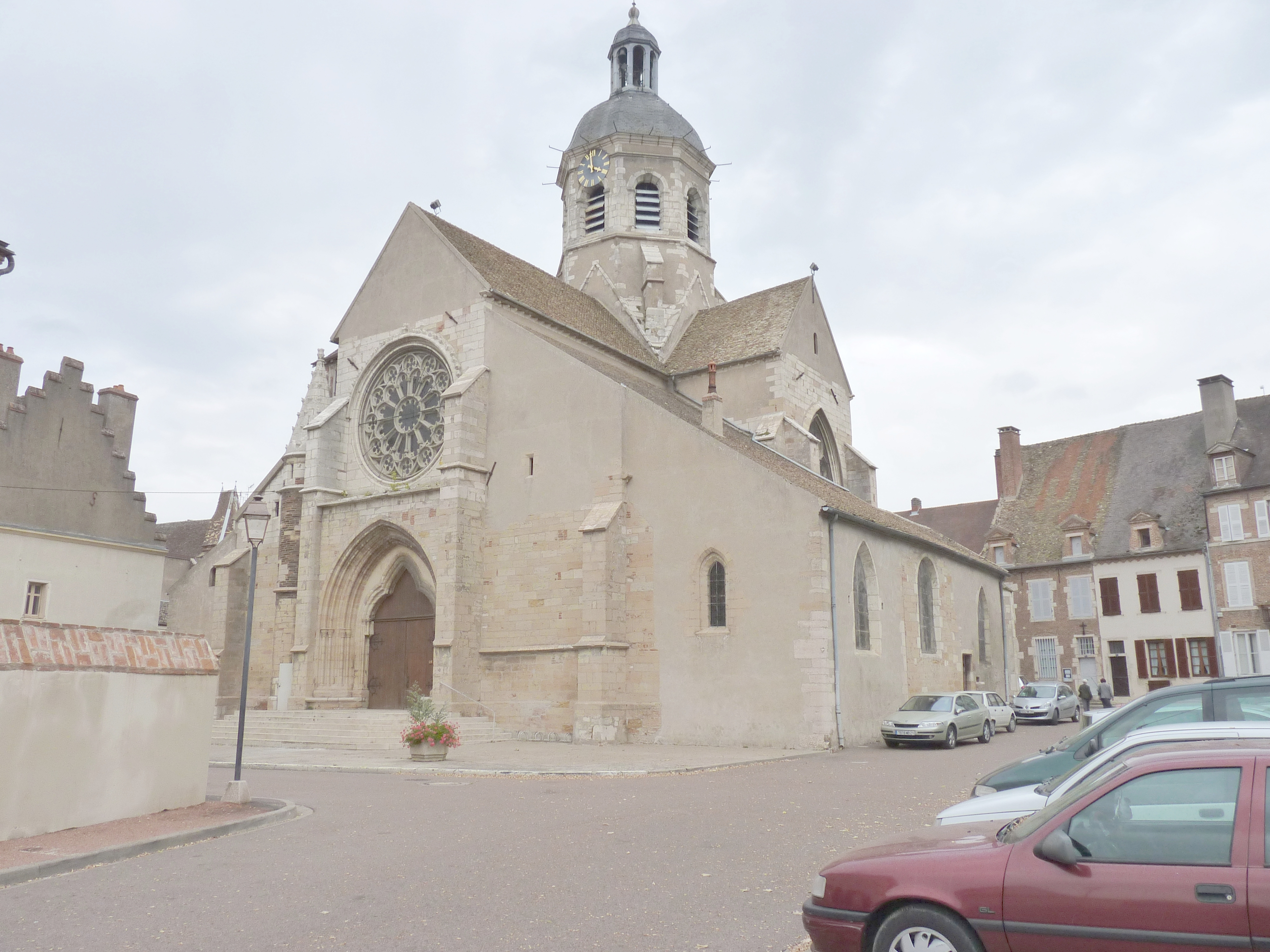
Church of Seurre

== See also ==
- Communes of the Côte-d'Or department
