= Kamiel Buysse =

Belgian cyclist (1934–2020)

Personal information
- Born: 8 July 1934
- Died: 26 October 2020 (aged 86)

Cycling career
- Sport: Cycling
- Role: Rider

Kamiel Buysse (8 July 1934 – 26 October 2020) was a Belgian racing cyclist. He rode in the 1959 Tour de France. He was the grandfather of Greg Van Avermaet.
