= Michele Gismondi =

Italian cyclist

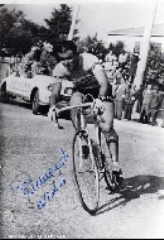

Personal information
- Full name: Michele Gismondi
- Born: 11 June 1931 Montegranaro, Italy
- Died: 5 September 2013 (aged 82) Montegranaro, Italy

Cycling career
- Sport: Cycling
- Discipline: Road
- Role: Rider, team manager

Professional teams
- 1952–1955: Bianchi–Pirelli
- 1956: Torpado–Pirelli
- 1957: Carpano–Coppi
- 1958: Ghigi–Coppi
- 1959: Tricofilina–Coppi
- 1960: Gazzola–Fiorelli

Managerial team
- 1963–1964: Cite

Michele Gismondi (11 June 1931 in Montegranaro – 5 September 2013) was an Italian professional road cyclist.

== Major results ==
1952
3rd Trofeo Baracchi (with Fausto Coppi)
1953
1st Gran Premio Industria Belmonte Piceno
1st Stage 11 Giro d'Italia (TTT)
2nd Giro del Lazio
4th Road race, World Road Championships
1954
2nd Giro di Campania
3rd Giro dell'Emilia
3rd Gran Premio Industria Belmonte Piceno
4th Road race, World Road Championships
1955
1st Stages 4 & 5 Roma-Napoli-Roma
1957
1st Stage 4 Roma-Napoli-Roma
2nd Giro di Campania
1959
1st Coppa Agostoni
2nd Road race, World Road Championships
2nd Trofeo Baracchi (with Diego Ronchini)
2nd Coppa Bernocchi
2nd Trofeo Boldini
3rd GP Faema

== Results on the major tours ==
=== Tour de France ===
- 1959: 30th

=== Giro d'Italia ===
- 1953: 38th
- 1954: 20th
- 1955: 13th
- 1958: 66th
- 1959: 16th
- 1960: 24th
