= Michel Dejouhannet =

French cyclist (1935–2019)

Personal information
- Full name: Michel Dejouhannet
- Born: 5 July 1935 Châteauroux, France
- Died: 11 January 2019 (aged 83) Le Poinçonnet, France

Cycling career
- Sport: Cycling
- Discipline: Road
- Role: Rider

Major wins
- 1 stage Tour de France

Michel Dejouhannet (5 July 1935, in Châteauroux – 11 January 2019) was a French professional road bicycle racer. In 1959, Dejouhannet won a stage in the 1959 Tour de France.

== Major results ==
1958
Bourges
Gouzon
Grand-Bourg
Guéret
La Souterraine
Montmorillon
Puteaux
Quimperlé
Uzerche
La Charité-sur-Loire
1959
Boussac
Circuit de l'Indre
Mauriac
Montluçon
Objat
Puteaux
Vailly-sur-Sauldre
Saint-Macaire en Mauges
Tour de France:

Winner stage 8

1960
Brigueil-le-Chantre
La Clayette
Pléaux
Bain-de-Bretagne
1961
Saint-Pierre le Moutier
1962
La Clayette
Terrasson la Villedieu
1963
Champagné-Saint-Hilaire
1964
Brigueil-le-Chantre
1965
Boucles du Bas-Lim
