= Max Bléneau =

French cyclist

Personal information
- Born: 22 January 1934 La Roche-sur-Yon, France
- Died: 30 October 2013 (aged 79) La Roche-sur-Yon, France

Cycling career
- Sport: Cycling
- Role: Rider

Max Bléneau (22 January 1934 – 30 October 2013) was a French professional racing cyclist. He rode in the 1959 and 1960 Tour de France.
