= Rolf Graf (cyclist) =

Swiss cyclist (1932–2019)

Personal information
- Full name: Rolf Graf
- Born: 19 August 1932 Unterentfelden, Aargau, Switzerland
- Died: 18 January 2019 (aged 86) Baden, Aargau, Switzerland

Cycling career
- Sport: Cycling
- Discipline: Road
- Role: Rider

Major wins
- 3 stages Tour de France

Rolf Graf (19 August 1932 - 18 January 2019) was a Swiss professional road bicycle racer. Rolf Graf was a protégé of the Swiss cyclist Ferdinand Kübler.

He competed in the individual and team road race events at the 1952 Summer Olympics. He was the Swiss National Road Race champion in 1956. In 1963, Graf had car crash in Italy, from which he never really recovered, and in 1964 he had to stop his cycling career.

== Major results ==
1954
Gent–Wevelgem
1955
Locarno
1956
Switzerland national road race championship
Tour de Suisse
Trofeo Baracchi (with André Darrigade)
1957
Basel
1958
GP du Locle
1959
Switzerland national road race championship
Giro d'Italia:

Winner stage 22

Tour de France:

Winner stages 12 and 19

1960
Nice
Tour de France:

Winner stage 19

Trofeo Longines (with Guido Carlesi, Silvano Ciampi, Emile Daems and Alfredo Sabbadin)
1962
Switzerland national road race championship
Berner Rundfahrt
