= Robert Cazala =

French cyclist (1934–2023)

Personal information
- Born: 7 January 1934 Bellocq, Pyrénées-Atlantiques, France
- Died: 18 February 2023 (aged 89)

Cycling career
- Sport: Cycling
- Discipline: Road
- Role: Rider

Amateur teams
- 1950–1954: Union cycliste Orthézienne
- 1955–1957: Cyclo-club Béarnais

Professional team
- 1958–1968: Mercier-BP-Hutchinson

Major wins
- Four stages in Tour de France; Six days in yellow jersey

Robert Cazala (7 January 1934 – 18 February 2023) was a French cyclist. He became professional in 1958, and stayed with the same team Mercier-BP-Hutchinson until he retired in 1968. During his career, he had 36 professional victories. He participated in 8 Tours de France, won four stages and wore the yellow jersey for six days.

Cazala died on 18 February 2023, at the age of 89.

== Major results ==
1958
Stage 8 Dauphiné Libéré.
Prix de Bergerac
Prix de Sigoules.
1959
Winner Tour de Champagne

Winner 5th stage

Tour de France: 32nd place

winner 3rd stage
six days in yellow jersey

Winner stage 3b in Grand Prix du Midi Libre
Prix de Puy-l'Evêque.
1960
Tour de France: not finished
Winner Tour de Champagne

Winner 2nd stage

Winner stage 6 Dauphiné Libéré
Winner stage 2 Midi-Libre
Winner stage 4 Tour du Sud-Est
Prix de Royan
Prix d'Alger
Prix de Brioude.
1961
Winner Tour du Var

Winner 1st stage Tour du Var

Tour de France: 40th place

Winner 21st stage

Winner stages 2 and 4 Midi-Libre
Prix de Morlaix.
1962
Tour de France: 22nd place

Winner stages 6 and 12

Winner stage 5 Tour du Sud-Est
Ronde de Seignelay
Prix de Plounavez.
1963
Tour de France: 30th place
Prix d'Eymoutiers
Prix de Lubersac
Prix de Saint-Macaud.
1964
Tour de France: 59th place
Winner stage 1 Midi-Libre
Prix de Saint-Hilaire
Prix de Maurs.
1965
Tour de France: 64th place
Grand Prix de la Trinité
Prix de Saint-Alvèze.
1966
Tour de France: 80th place
Grand Prix d'Espéraza.
