= Marcel Queheille =

French cyclist (1930–2021)

Personal information
- Full name: Marcel Queheille
- Born: 16 March 1930 Sanguis, France
- Died: 17 July 2021 (aged 91) Oloron-Sainte-Marie, France

Cycling career
- Sport: Cycling
- Discipline: Road
- Role: Rider

Major wins
- 1 stage Tour de France

Marcel Queheille (16 March 1930 – 17 July 2021) was a French professional road bicycle racer. He was born in Sanguis. In 1959 Queheille was the winner of the ninth stage of the 1959 Tour de France.

== Major results ==
1956
Cazès-Mondenard
Tarbes
1957
Felletin
Grand-Bourg
1958
Bessereix
Villefranche-en-Rouerge
1959
Guéret
Tour de France:

Winner stage 9

1961
Mende
1962
Saint-Jean
