= Michel Vermeulin =

French cyclist

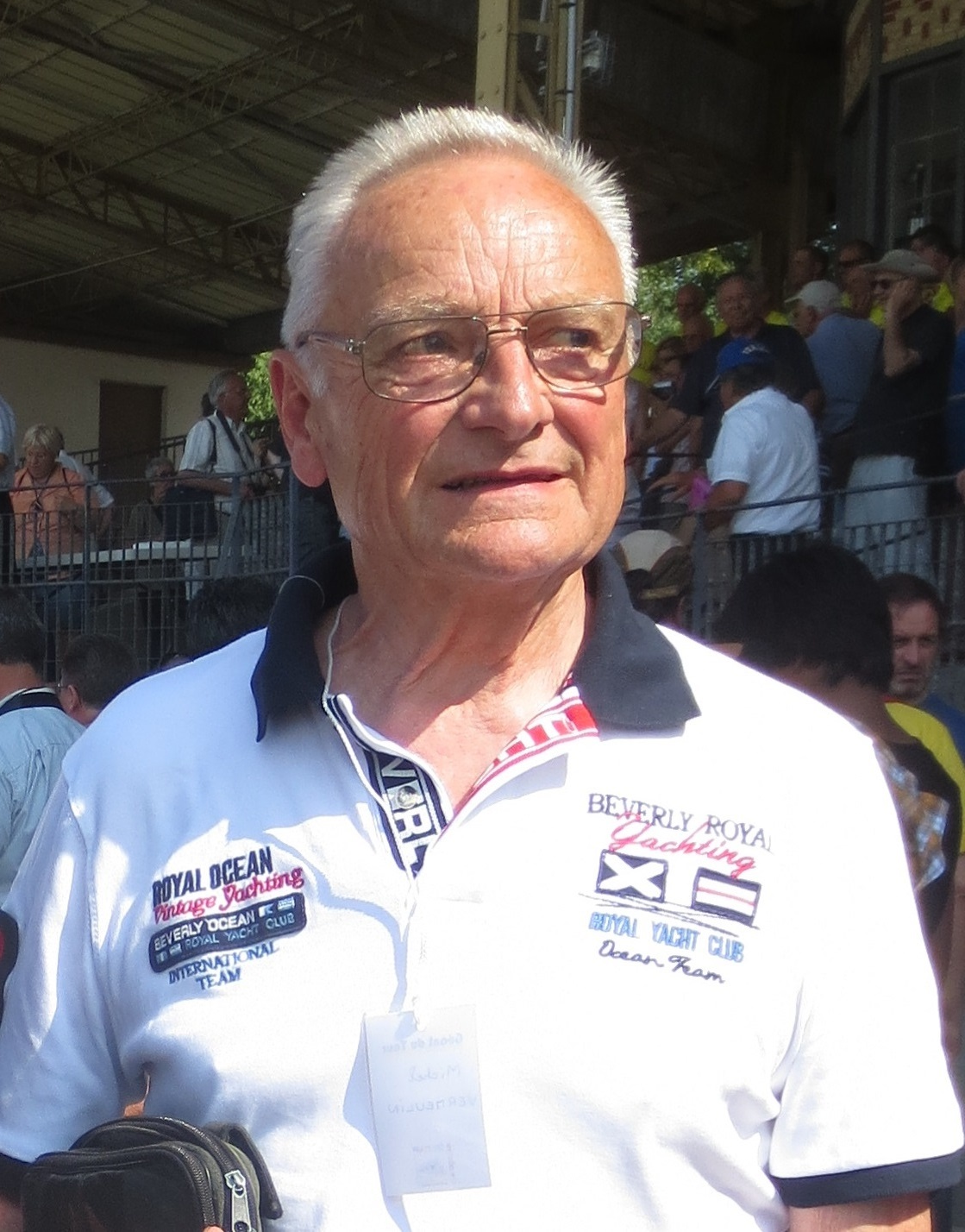

Personal information
- Full name: Michel Vermeulin
- Born: 6 September 1934 (age 92) Montreuil, Seine-Saint-Denis, France

Cycling career
- Sport: Cycling
- Current team: Retired
- Discipline: Road
- Role: Rider

Major wins
- Gold Medal team time trial at Summer Olympics
Medal record
Men's cycling
Representing FRA
Olympic Games
Gold medal – first place	1956 Melbourne	Team road race
Silver medal – second place	1956 Melbourne	Team pursuit

Michel Vermeulin (born 6 September 1934) is a former road and track cyclist from France, who won the gold medal in the men's team road race at the 1956 Summer Olympics in Melbourne, Australia, alongside Arnaud Geyre and Maurice Moucheraud. He also won the silver medal in the men's 4.000m team pursuit in the track competition in Melbourne, Australia. Vermeulin was a professional rider from 1958 to 1964.

== Major results ==
1956
Gold Medal team time trial at Summer Olympics
1958
Aurillac
Circuit de la Vienne
1959
Trofeo Longines (with Jacques Anquetil, André Darrigade, Seamus Elliott and Jean Graczyk)
Tour de France:

Wearing yellow jersey for three days

1960
Grand Prix de Fourmies
