= Gérard Saint =

French cyclist

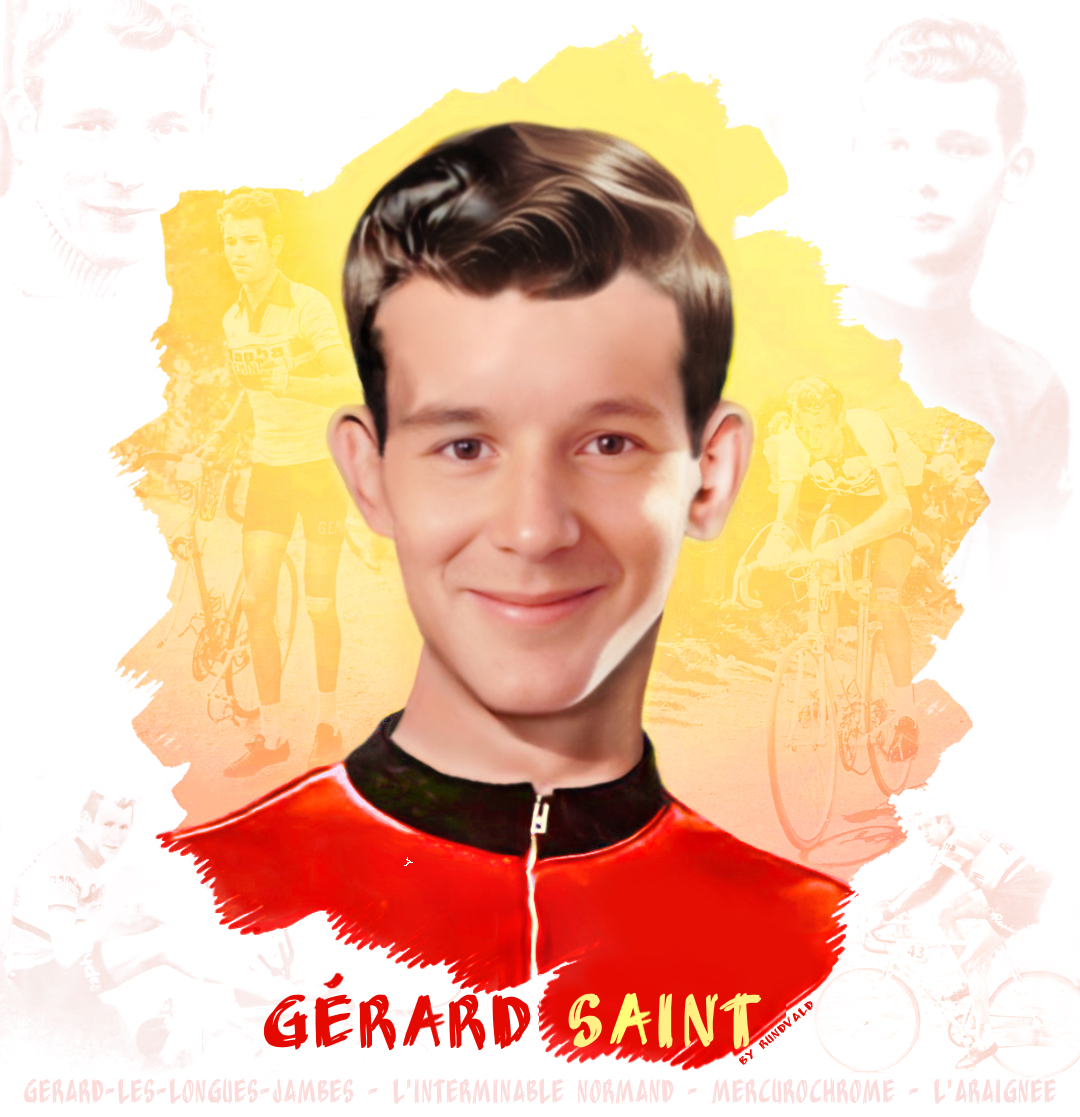

Personal information
- Full name: Gérard Saint
- Born: 11 July 1935 Argentan, France
- Died: 16 March 1960 (aged 24) Le Mans, France

Cycling career
- Sport: Cycling
- Discipline: Road
- Role: Rider

Gérard Saint (11 July 1935 in Argentan – 16 March 1960 in Le Mans) was a French professional road bicycle racer. In the 1959 Tour de France, Saint was the winner of the Combativity award. In 1960, while driving his Citroën DS near Le Mans, Saint hit a tree and died at the scene.

== Major results ==
1957
Tour de Luxembourg
Tour de l'Ariège
1958
Boucles de l'Aulne
Egletons
Meymac
Taule
1959
Bol d'Or des Monédières Chaumeil
Felletin
GP d'Alger (with Raphaël Géminiani and Roger Rivière)
Nice
Saint-Jean d'Angely
Chateau-Chinon
Manche-Océan
Tour de France:

9th place overall classification
Winner Combativity award

== Legacy ==
The stadium of FC Argentan was named after him, a few years after his death.
