= Eddy Pauwels =

Belgian cyclist

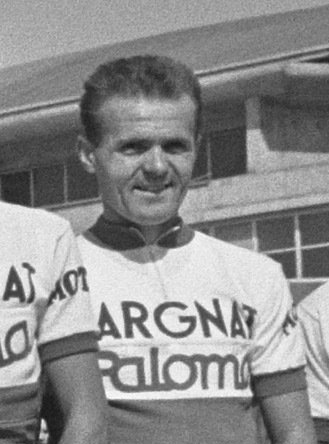
- Pauwels at the 1964 Tour de France

Personal information
- Full name: Eddy Pauwels
- Born: 2 May 1935 Bornem, Belgium
- Died: 6 March 2017 (aged 81) Bornem

Cycling career
- Sport: Cycling
- Discipline: Road
- Role: Rider

Professional teams
- 1958: Libertas–Dr. Mann
- 1959: Flandria–Dr.Mann
- 1960–1962: Dr. Mann–Dossche Sport
- 1962–1963: Wiel's–Groene Leeuw
- 1964: Margnat–Paloma–Dunlop
- 1965–1966: Wiel's–Groene Leeuw

Major wins
- 4 stages, Tour de France

Eddy Pauwels (2 May 1935 – 6 March 2017) was a Belgian racing cyclist from 1958 to 1966. He won 4 stages in the Tour de France and wore the yellow jersey for 4 days in total. In 1962, Pauwels won the combativity award in the Tour de France. He died on 6 March 2017 at the age of 81.

== Major results ==
1957
1st Overall DDR Rundfahrt
1958
6th Overall Critérium du Dauphiné Libéré
1959
4th Overall Tour of Belgium

1st Stage 3

Tour de France

Held after Stages 9 & 16

1960
1st Overall Trois Jours d'Anvers
1961
4th Overall Tour of Belgium
5th Scheldeprijs
9th Overall Tour de France

1st Stages 14 & 17

1962
9th Overall Vuelta a España
10th Overall Tour de France

1st Stage 11

1963
Tour de France

Held after Stages 1–2
1st Stage 1

4th Grote Prijs Jef Scherens
6th Rund um den Henninger Turm
1964
4th Overall Tour de Romandie
