= 1959 Tour de France =

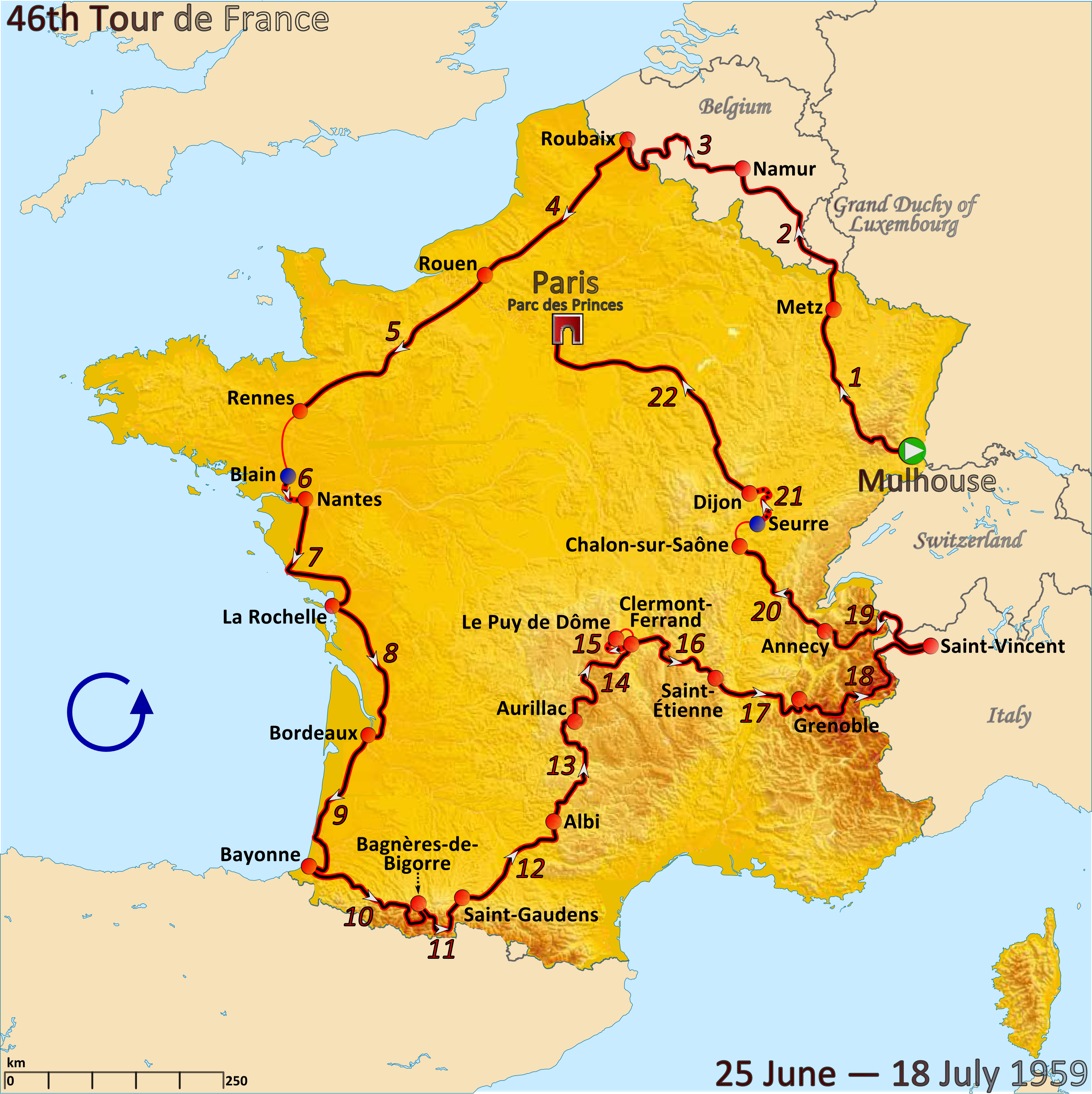
- Route of the 1959 Tour de France followed counterclockwise, starting in Mulhouse and finishing in Paris

Race details
- Dates: 25 June – 18 July 1959
- Stages: 22
- Distance: 4,358 km (2,708 mi)
- Winning time: 123h 46' 45"

Results
| Jersey awarded to the overall winner | Winner | Federico Bahamontes (ESP) | (Spain) |
| | Second | Henry Anglade (FRA) | (Centre-Midi) |
| | Third | Jacques Anquetil (FRA) | (France) |
| Jersey awarded to the points classification winner | Points | André Darrigade (FRA) | (France) |
| | Mountains | Federico Bahamontes (ESP) | (Spain) |
| | Combativity | Gérard Saint (FRA) | (West/South-West) |
| | Team | Belgium | |

The 1959 Tour de France was the 46th edition of the Tour de France, taking place between 25 June and 18 July. The race featured 120 riders, of which 65 finished. The Tour included 22 stages over 4,358 km (2,708 mi).

The race was won by Spanish cyclist Federico Bahamontes, who also won the mountains classification. The points classification was won by French sprinter André Darrigade. The Belgian team became the winner of the team classification.

Although the French national team had the favourites, the race was contested between Henry Anglade, in a French regional team, and Bahamontes, in the Spanish national team. After the French national team refused to help Anglade, Bahamontes won the race. It was the first win by a Spanish cyclist.

== Teams ==
The teams entering the race were:

- Belgium
- France
- Internationals
- Italy
- Netherlands/Luxembourg
- Spain
- Switzerland/West Germany
- Centre-Midi
- Paris/North-East
- West/South-West

== Pre-race favourites ==
The French team included Jacques Anquetil, Louison Bobet, Raphael Géminiani and Roger Riviere, who were all considered possible Tour winners. This also posed a problem, as they did all want to be team captain, and refused to work for each other.

The Spanish team was headed by Federico Bahamontes, who in previous years did not care for flat stages and time trials, and only tried to win the mountains classification. In the 1959 season, Bahamontes had Fausto Coppi as manager, and Coppi convinced Bahamontes to focus on the general classification.

The defending champion Charly Gaul was again placed in a mixed team of Luxembourgian and Dutch cyclists, and expected little support. The Italian team did not include Vito Favero and Gastone Nencini, who had performed well in the 1958 Tour. Their team captain was Ercole Baldini, winner of the 1958 Giro d'Italia, but he was not expected to be able to compete against Gaul, Bahamontes and Anquetil.

Of the cyclists in the French regional teams, Henri Anglade was the most notable. He was included in the Centre-Midi team.

The cyclists were represented by agents, who negotiated for the prices in post-tour criteriums. There were two major agents: Daniel Dousset, who represented Anquetil, Rivière and Bahamontes, and Piel Poulidor, who represented Anglade. This made it more important for Anquetil to help Bahamontes than Anglade.

== Route and stages ==
The 1959 Tour de France started on 25 June in Mulhouse, and had two rest days, in Bayonne and Saint-Étienne. The highest point of elevation in the race was 2,770 m (9,090 ft) at the summit of the Col de l'Iseran mountain pass on stage 18.

Stage characteristics and winners
| Stage | Date | Course | Distance | Type | Winner |
|---|---|---|---|---|---|
| 1 | 25 June | Mulhouse to Metz | 238 km (148 mi) | Plain stage | André Darrigade (FRA) |
| 2 | 26 June | Metz to Namur (Belgium) | 234 km (145 mi) | Plain stage | Vito Favero (ITA) |
| 3 | 27 June | Namur (Belgium) to Roubaix | 217 km (135 mi) | Plain stage | Robert Cazala (FRA) |
| 4 | 28 June | Roubaix to Rouen | 230 km (140 mi) | Plain stage | Dino Bruni (ITA) |
| 5 | 29 June | Rouen to Rennes | 286 km (178 mi) | Plain stage | Jean Graczyk (FRA) |
| 6 | 30 June | Blain to Nantes | 45 km (28 mi) | Individual time trial | Roger Rivière (FRA) |
| 7 | 1 July | Nantes to La Rochelle | 190 km (120 mi) | Plain stage | Roger Hassenforder (FRA) |
| 8 | 2 July | La Rochelle to Bordeaux | 201 km (125 mi) | Plain stage | Michel Dejouhannet (FRA) |
| 9 | 3 July | Bordeaux to Bayonne | 207 km (129 mi) | Plain stage | Marcel Queheille (FRA) |
| | 4 July | Bayonne | | Rest day | |
| 10 | 5 July | Bayonne to Bagnères-de-Bigorre | 235 km (146 mi) | Stage with mountain(s) | Marcel Janssens (BEL) |
| 11 | 6 July | Bagnères-de-Bigorre to Saint-Gaudens | 119 km (74 mi) | Stage with mountain(s) | André Darrigade (FRA) |
| 12 | 7 July | Saint-Gaudens to Albi | 184 km (114 mi) | Plain stage | Rolf Graf (SUI) |
| 13 | 8 July | Albi to Aurillac | 219 km (136 mi) | Stage with mountain(s) | Henry Anglade (FRA) |
| 14 | 9 July | Aurillac to Clermont-Ferrand | 231 km (144 mi) | Stage with mountain(s) | André Le Dissez (FRA) |
| 15 | 10 July | Puy de Dôme | 12 km (7.5 mi) | Mountain time trial | Federico Bahamontes (ESP) |
| 16 | 11 July | Clermont-Ferrand to Saint-Étienne | 210 km (130 mi) | Plain stage | Dino Bruni (ITA) |
| | 12 July | Saint-Étienne | | Rest day | |
| 17 | 13 July | Saint-Étienne to Grenoble | 197 km (122 mi) | Stage with mountain(s) | Charly Gaul (LUX) |
| 18 | 14 July | Grenoble to Saint-Vincent (Italy) | 243 km (151 mi) | Stage with mountain(s) | Ercole Baldini (ITA) |
| 19 | 15 July | Saint-Vincent (Italy) to Annecy | 251 km (156 mi) | Stage with mountain(s) | Rolf Graf (SUI) |
| 20 | 16 July | Annecy to Chalon-sur-Saône | 202 km (126 mi) | Plain stage | Brian Robinson (GBR) |
| 21 | 17 July | Seurre to Dijon | 69 km (43 mi) | Individual time trial | Roger Rivière (FRA) |
| 22 | 18 July | Dijon to Paris | 331 km (206 mi) | Plain stage | Joseph Groussard (FRA) |
| | Total | | 4,358 km (2,708 mi) | | |

== Race overview ==
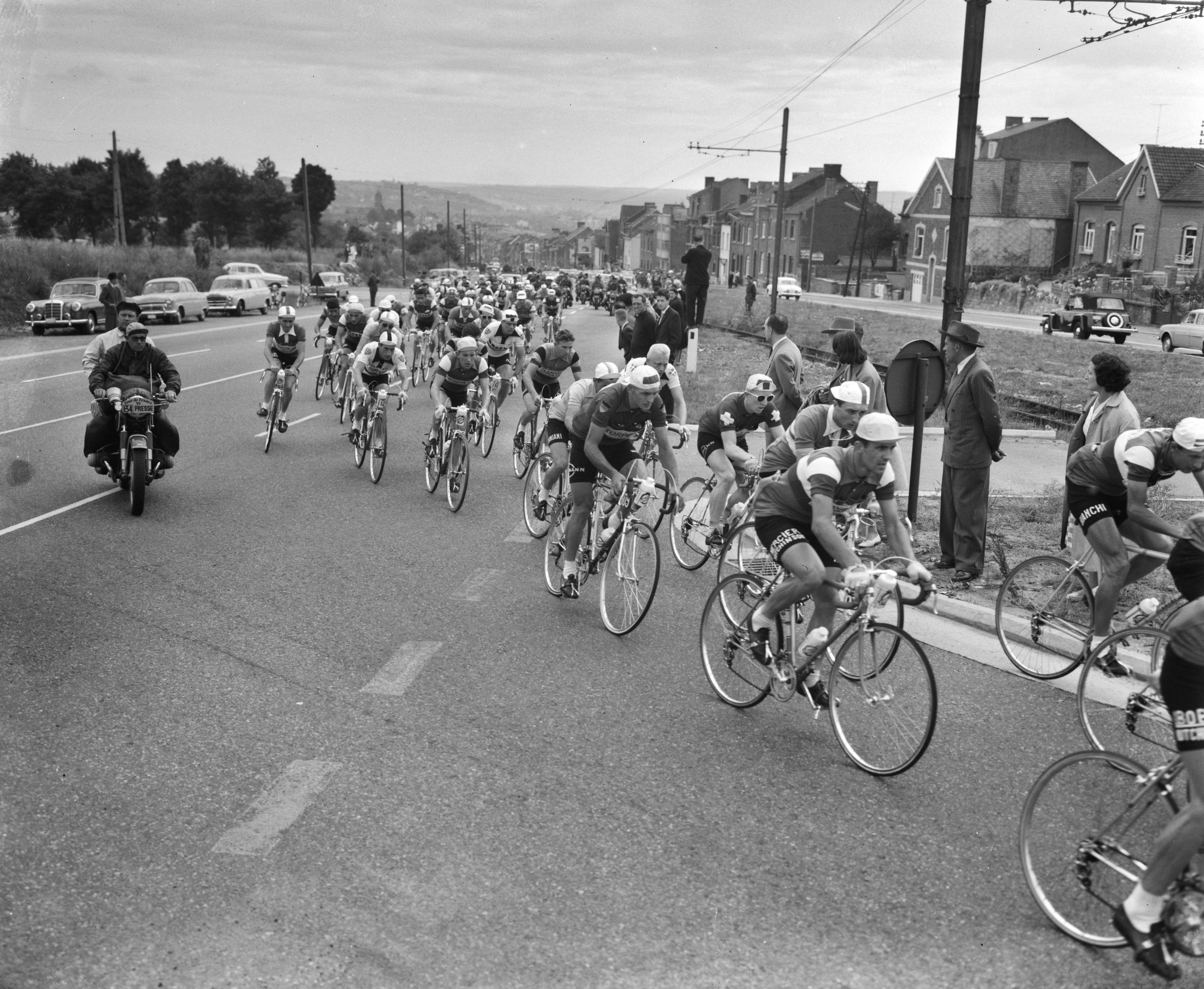
The peloton during stage nine between Bordeaux and Bayonne

During the Tour, a package of strychnine, addressed to one of the teams, was intercepted by the Tour doctor.

Like in the previous years, Darrigade won the first stage. In the third stage, a group of 13 cyclists escaped, none of them considered favourites for the overall victory. The favourites let them escape, knowing that they would win enough time back in the mountains, and the group won more than 10 minutes on the rest. Robert Cazala from the French national team became the new leader.

Anglade was riding well in the first stages. Because of an escape in stage 7, he gained a few minutes on the top favourites. In the ninth stage, the Belgian cyclists broke away, and the French team followed them. Cazala was not able to follow them, and he lost the lead. Eddy Pauwels became the new leader Pauwels lost the lead in the tenth stage, and regional Michel Vermeulin became the new leader.

After stage 12, Anglade was in fifth place in the general classification, the first of the favourites for the overall victory. In the thirteenth stage, Anglade attacked and won the stage. He jumped to second place in the general classification.

The French team director then concentrated the strategy on beating Anglade, because he thought Anglade was the main threat. The fifteenth stage was an individual mountain time trial, won by Spaniard Bahamontes. Bahamontes climbed to the second place in the general classification, only 4 seconds behind Jos Hoevenaers, the last man from the escaped group in stage 3 to stay high in the general classification. Eddy Pauwels was in third place, while Anglade was still in fourth place, only 43 seconds behind Hoevenaers.

In the sixteenth stage, Pauwels was in the escaped group, and won enough time to take over the lead in the general classification. In the seventeenth stage, Bahamontes and Gaul escaped. Gaul won the stage, but Bahamontes took the leading position.

The eighteenth stage would determine the outcome of the race. Bahamontes was leading, but his teammates had used a lot of energy the day before. The French national team was expected to attack. In the eighteenth stage, Gaul was the first one to attack, and reached the top of the Galibier first, but later the other riders got back to him. On the way down from the Iseran, Bahamontes and Gaul were left behind, and Anquetil and Rivière were expected to increase their efforts, such that Bahamontes and Gaul would not be able to get back to them. Anquetil and Rivière did not want to assist each other and did nothing, so Bahamontes and Gaul were able to get back. Anquetil and Rivière then were left behind. On the last climb, Anglade attacked. Baldini and Gaul could follow, but Bahamontes could not, and at some moment was five minutes behind. This made Anglade the virtual race leader, which was against the wishes of the national team. Anquetil and Rivière then reached Bahamontes, and helped him to get back to Anglade.

The only risk for Bahamontes left was the time trial in stage 21. At the start, Bahamontes was leading by 5'40". In the time trial, Anglade won 1'39" back on Bahamontes, but that was not enough. When the Tour ended in the Parc des Princes velodrome in Paris, the French crowd booed the French national team, because they did not allow Anglade the victory.

== Classification leadership and awards ==
The time that each cyclist required to finish each stage was recorded, and these times were added together for the general classification. If a cyclist had received a time bonus, it was subtracted from this total; all time penalties were added to this total. The cyclist with the least accumulated time was the race leader, identified by the yellow jersey.

Points given in each stage
| Position | 1 | 2 | 3 | 4 | 5 | 6 | 7 | 8 | 9 | 10 | 11 | 12 | 13 | 14 | 15 | 16 | 17 | 18 | 19 | 20 | 21 | 22 | 23 | 24 | 25 |
| Points | 100 | 80 | 60 | 50 | 40 | 35 | 30 | 25 | 23 | 21 | 19 | 17 | 15 | 13 | 11 | 10 | 9 | 8 | 7 | 6 | 5 | 4 | 3 | 2 | 1 |

The points classification was calculated differently than in the years before. The winner of a stage received 100 points, down to 1 point for the 25th cyclist. André Darrigade took the lead by winning the first stage, and remained the leader for the rest of the race.

The mountains classification was calculated by adding the points given to cyclists for reaching the highest point in a climb first.

The team classification was calculated as the sum of the daily team classifications, and the daily team classification was calculated by adding the times in the stage result of the best three cyclists per team. It was won by the Belgian team.

In addition, there was a combativity award given after each stage to the cyclist considered most combative. The decision was made by a jury composed of journalists who gave points. The cyclist with the most points from votes in all stages led the combativity classification. Gérard Saint won this classification, and was given overall the super-combativity award. The Souvenir Henri Desgrange was given to the first rider to pass the memorial to Tour founder Henri Desgrange near the summit of the Col du Galibier on stage 18. This prize was won by Charly Gaul.

Classification leadership and awards by stage
| Stage | Winner | General classification | Points classification | Mountains classification (Note: No jersey was awarded to the leader of the mountains classification until a white jersey with red polka dots was introduced in 1975.) | Team classification | Combativity | | Bad luck award |
| Stage | Winner | General classification | Points classification | Mountains classification | Team classification | Award | Classification | Bad luck award |
|---|---|---|---|---|---|---|---|---|
| 1 | André Darrigade | André Darrigade | André Darrigade | Louis Bergaud | France | Louis Bergaud | Louis Bergaud | André Le Dissez |
| 2 | Vito Favero | André Darrigade | André Darrigade | Louis Bergaud | France | Jean-Claude Annaert | Louis Bergaud | Otto Altweg |
| 3 | Robert Cazala | Robert Cazala | André Darrigade | Louis Bergaud/Eddy Pauwels | France | Eddy Pauwels | Eddy Pauwels | Jean Robic |
| 4 | Dino Bruni | Robert Cazala | André Darrigade | Louis Bergaud/Eddy Pauwels | France | Piet van Est | Piet van Est | Jean Anastasi |
| 5 | Jean Graczyk | Robert Cazala | André Darrigade | Louis Bergaud/Eddy Pauwels | France | Francis Pipelin | Piet van Est | no award |
| 6 | Roger Rivière | Robert Cazala | André Darrigade | Louis Bergaud/Eddy Pauwels | France | Gérard Saint | Piet van Est | Louis Bergaud |
| 7 | Roger Hassenforder | Robert Cazala | André Darrigade | Louis Bergaud/Eddy Pauwels | France | Jos Hoevenaers | Piet van Est | Gérard Saint |
| 8 | Michel Dejouhannet | Robert Cazala | André Darrigade | Louis Bergaud/Eddy Pauwels | France | Seamus Elliott | Piet van Est | Mathias Löder |
| 9 | Marcel Queheille | Eddy Pauwels | André Darrigade | Louis Bergaud/Eddy Pauwels | Belgium | Marcel Queheille | Piet van Est | Raphaël Géminiani |
| 10 | Marcel Janssens | Michel Vermeulin | André Darrigade | Armand Desmet | Belgium | Gérard Saint | Gérard Saint | Guillaume Van Tongerloo |
| 11 | André Darrigade | Michel Vermeulin | André Darrigade | Federico Bahamontes | Belgium | Valentin Huot | Gérard Saint | Jean Robic |
| 12 | Rolf Graf | Michel Vermeulin | André Darrigade | Federico Bahamontes | Belgium | Manuel Busto | Gérard Saint | Félix Lebuhotel |
| 13 | Henry Anglade | Jos Hoevenaers | André Darrigade | Federico Bahamontes | Belgium | Federico Bahamontes | Henry Anglade | Jean Dotto |
| 14 | André Le Dissez | Jos Hoevenaers | André Darrigade | Federico Bahamontes | Belgium | André Le Dissez | Gérard Saint | Max Schellenberg |
| 15 | Federico Bahamontes | Jos Hoevenaers | André Darrigade | Federico Bahamontes | Belgium | Victor Sutton | Henry Anglade | Max Schellenberg |
| 16 | Dino Bruni | Eddy Pauwels | André Darrigade | Federico Bahamontes | Belgium | no award | Gérard Saint | André Le Dissez |
| 17 | Charly Gaul | Federico Bahamontes | André Darrigade | Federico Bahamontes | Belgium | Charly Gaul | Gérard Saint | Jef Planckaert |
| 18 | Ercole Baldini | Federico Bahamontes | André Darrigade | Federico Bahamontes | Belgium | Michele Gismondi | Gérard Saint | Adolf Christian |
| 19 | Rolf Graf | Federico Bahamontes | André Darrigade | Federico Bahamontes | Belgium | Rolf Graf | Gérard Saint | Carmelo Morales |
| 20 | Brian Robinson | Federico Bahamontes | André Darrigade | Federico Bahamontes | Belgium | Brian Robinson | Gérard Saint | Thadeus Wierucki |
| 21 | Roger Rivière | Federico Bahamontes | André Darrigade | Federico Bahamontes | Belgium | Jan Adriaensens | Gérard Saint | Rolf Graf |
| 22 | Joseph Groussard | Federico Bahamontes | André Darrigade | Federico Bahamontes | Belgium | no award | Gérard Saint | Roberto Falaschi |
| Final | | Federico Bahamontes | André Darrigade | Federico Bahamontes | Belgium | Gérard Saint | | Seamus Elliott |

== Final standings ==
=== General classification ===
Final general classification (1–10)
| Rank | Rider | Team | Time |
|---|---|---|---|
| 1 | Federico Bahamontes (ESP) | Spain | 123h 46' 45" |
| 2 | Henry Anglade (FRA) | Centre-Midi | + 4' 01" |
| 3 | Jacques Anquetil (FRA) | France | + 5' 05" |
| 4 | Roger Rivière (FRA) | France | + 5' 17" |
| 5 | François Mahé (FRA) | West/South-West | + 8' 22" |
| 6 | Ercole Baldini (ITA) | Italy | + 10' 18" |
| 6 | Jan Adriaensens (BEL) | Belgium | + 10' 18" |
| 8 | Jos Hoevenaers (BEL) | Belgium | + 11' 02" |
| 9 | Gérard Saint (FRA) | West/South-West | + 17' 40" |
| 10 | Jean Brankart (BEL) | Belgium | + 20' 38" |

Final general classification (11–65)
| Rank | Rider | Team | Time |
|---|---|---|---|
| 11 | Eddy Pauwels (BEL) | Belgium | + 22' 20" |
| 12 | Charly Gaul (LUX) | Netherlands-Luxembourg | + 23' 59" |
| 13 | Louis Bergaud (FRA) | Centre-Midi | + 36' 54" |
| 14 | Fernando Manzaneque (ESP) | Spain | + 57' 29" |
| 15 | Jean Dotto (FRA) | Centre-Midi | + 1h 00' 04" |
| 16 | André Darrigade (FRA) | France | + 1h 03' 01" |
| 17 | Jef Planckaert (BEL) | Belgium | + 1h 05' 00" |
| 18 | Lothar Friedrich (FRG) | Switzerland/West Germany | + 1h 11' 51" |
| 19 | Brian Robinson (GBR) | Internationals | + 1h 12' 11" |
| 20 | Michel Vermeulin (FRA) | France Paris/North-East | + 1h 16' 10" |
| 21 | Rolf Graf (SUI) | Switzerland/West Germany | + 1h 19' 32" |
| 22 | Michel Van Aerde (BEL) | Belgium | + 1h 19' 35" |
| 23 | Armand Desmet (BEL) | Belgium | + 1h 23' 07" |
| 24 | Joseph Thomin (FRA) | West/South-West | + 1h 33' 34" |
| 25 | Marcel Janssens (BEL) | Belgium | + 1h 40' 39" |
| 26 | Marcel Queheille (FRA) | West/South-West | + 1h 42' 22" |
| 27 | Piet Damen (NED) | Netherland/Luxembourg | + 1h 42' 26" |
| 28 | Raphaël Géminiani (FRA) | France | + 1h 43' 57" |
| 29 | Raymond Hoorelbeke (FRA) | France Paris/North-East | + 1h 44' 35" |
| 30 | Michele Gismondi (ITA) | Italy | + 1h 45' 19" |
| 31 | Fred De Bruyne (BEL) | Belgium | + 1h 48' 50" |
| 32 | Robert Cazala (FRA) | France | + 1h 49' 59" |
| 33 | Marcel Ernzer (LUX) | Netherland/Luxembourg | + 1h 50' 33" |
| 34 | Jean Forestier (FRA) | Centre-Midi | + 1h 50' 45" |
| 35 | Jean Graczyk (FRA) | France | + 1h 56' 50" |
| 36 | Ernesto Bono (ITA) | Italy | + 1h 57' 48" |
| 37 | Victor Sutton (GBR) | Internationals | + 1h 58' 34" |
| 38 | Aurelio Cestari (ITA) | Italy | + 1h 59' 31" |
| 39 | Manuel Busto (FRA) | Centre-Midi | + 1h 59' 37" |
| 40 | Julio San Emeterio (ESP) | Spain | + 2h 01' 51" |
| 41 | Adolf Christian (AUT) | Internationals | + 2h 06' 10" |
| 42 | Nello Fabbri (ITA) | Italy | + 2h 07' 29" |
| 43 | Carmelo Morales Erostarbe (ESP) | Spain | + 2h 08' 43" |
| 44 | Fernand Picot (FRA) | West/South-West | + 2h 11' 49" |
| 45 | Aldo Bolzan (ITA) | Netherland/Luxembourg | + 2h 15' 20" |
| 46 | Félix Lebuhotel (FRA) | West/South-West | + 2h 17' 06" |
| 47 | José Gómez del Moral (ESP) | Spain | + 2h 19' 21" |
| 48 | Valentin Huot (FRA) | Centre-Midi | + 2h 21' 00" |
| 49 | Franz Reitz (FRG) | Switzerland/West Germany | + 2h 22' 22" |
| 50 | Jaap Kersten (NED) | Netherland/Luxembourg | + 2h 24' 38" |
| 51 | Marcel Rohrbach (FRA) | Centre-Midi | + 2h 25' 13" |
| 52 | Arigo Padovan (ITA) | Italy | + 2h 25' 48" |
| 53 | Martin Van Geneugden (BEL) | Belgium | + 2h 26' 21" |
| 54 | Édouard Delberghe (FRA) | France Paris/North-East | + 2h 26' 32" |
| 55 | Ernst Traxel (SUI) | Switzerland/West Germany | + 2h 33' 18" |
| 56 | Joseph Groussard (FRA) | West/South-West | + 2h 33' 36" |
| 57 | Waldemaro Bartolozzi (ITA) | Italy | + 2h 35' 07" |
| 58 | Juan Campillo (ESP) | Spain | + 2h 35' 09" |
| 59 | Louis Rostollan (FRA) | Centre-Midi | + 2h 38' 40" |
| 60 | Pierino Baffi (ITA) | Italy | + 2h 44' 08" |
| 61 | Kamiel Buysse (BEL) | Belgium | + 2h 46' 36" |
| 62 | Tino Sabbadini (FRA) | West/South-West | + 2h 53' 15" |
| 63 | Max Bléneau (FRA) | West/South-West | + 2h 54' 28" |
| 64 | Dino Bruni (ITA) | Italy | + 3h 05' 13" |
| 65 | Louis Bisilliat (FRA) | Centre-Midi | + 3h 12' 35" |

=== Points classification ===
Final points classification (1–10)
| Rank | Rider | Team | Points |
|---|---|---|---|
| 1 | André Darrigade (FRA) | France | 613 |
| 2 | Gérard Saint (FRA) | West/South-West | 524 |
| 3 | Jacques Anquetil (FRA) | France | 503 |
| 4 | Federico Bahamontes (ESP) | Spain | 425 |
| 4 | Charly Gaul (LUX) | Netherlands/Luxembourg | 425 |
| 6 | Rolf Graf (SUI) | Switzerland/West Germany | 394 |
| 7 | Roger Rivière (FRA) | France | 390 |
| 8 | Jos Hoevenaers (BEL) | Belgium | 387 |
| 9 | Henry Anglade (FRA) | Centre-Midi | 383 |
| 10 | Michel Van Aerde (BEL) | Belgium | 366 |

=== Mountains classification ===
Final mountains classification (1–10)
| Rank | Rider | Team | Points |
|---|---|---|---|
| 1 | Federico Bahamontes (ESP) | Spain | 73 |
| 2 | Charly Gaul (LUX) | Netherlands/Luxembourg | 68 |
| 3 | Gérard Saint (FRA) | West/South-West | 65 |
| 4 | Valentin Huot (FRA) | Centre-Midi | 42 |
| 5 | Roger Rivière (FRA) | France | 27 |
| 6 | Louis Bergaud (FRA) | Centre-Midi | 24 |
| 7 | Adolf Christian (AUT) | Internationals | 19 |
| 7 | Michele Gismondi (ITA) | Italy | 19 |
| 9 | Henry Anglade (FRA) | Centre-Midi | 15 |
| 10 | François Mahé (FRA) | West/South-West | 14 |

=== Team classification ===
Final team classification
| Rank | Team | Time |
|---|---|---|
| 1 | Belgium | 372h 02' 13" |
| 2 | France | + 31' 25" |
| 3 | Centre-Midi | + 59' 01" |
| 4 | West/South-West | + 1h 17' 38" |
| 5 | Spain | + 2h 17' 22" |
| 6 | Italy | + 3h 11' 27" |
| 7 | Netherlands/Luxembourg | + 3h 15' 00" |
| 8 | Switzerland/West Germany | + 4h 11' 47" |
| 9 | Internationals | + 4h 34' 57" |
| 10 | France Paris/North-East | + 4h 45' 19" |

=== Combativity classification ===
Final combativity classification (1–10)
| Rank | Rider | Team | Points |
|---|---|---|---|
| 1 | Gérard Saint (FRA) | West/South-West | 243 |
| 2 | Henry Anglade (FRA) | Centre-Midi | 169 |
| 3 | Federico Bahamontes (ESP) | Spain | 102 |
| 4 | Michele Gismondi (ITA) | Italy | 101 |
| 4 | Rolf Graf (SUI) | Switzerland/West Germany | 101 |
| 6 | Brian Robinson (GBR) | Internationals | 84 |
| 6 | Marcel Queheille (FRA) | West/South-West | 84 |
| 8 | Eddy Pauwels (BEL) | Belgium | 82 |
| 9 | Valentin Huot (FRA) | Centre-Midi | 75 |
| 10 | Louis Bergaud (FRA) | Centre-Midi | 68 |

== Bibliography ==
- Augendre, Jacques (2016). "Guide historique" [Historical guide] (PDF). Tour de France (in French). Paris: Amaury Sport Organisation. Archived (PDF) from the original on 17 August 2016.
- Dimeo, Paul (2007). A History of Drug Use in Sport: 1876–1976: Beyond Good and Evil. London: Routledge. ISBN 978-0-415-35772-2.
- McGann, Bill; McGann, Carol (2006). The Story of the Tour de France: 1903–1964. Vol. 1. Indianapolis, IN: Dog Ear Publishing. ISBN 978-1-59858-180-5.
- Nauright, John; Parrish, Charles (2012). Sports Around the World: History, Culture, and Practice. Vol. 2. Santa Barbara, CA: ABC-CLIO. ISBN 978-1-59884-300-2.
- van den Akker, Pieter (2018). Tour de France Rules and Statistics: 1903–2018. Self-published. ISBN 978-1-79398-080-9.
