= World University Cycling Championship – Road Cycling =

World University Cycling Championship – Road Cycling are the world university championship races for road bicycle racing. Since 1978 the championship is sponsored by the International University Sports Federation (FISU). There competitions are sanctioned by the Union Cycliste Internationale (UCI). There are three road racing disciplines, a road race, time trial, and criterium for both men and women. The criterium discipline was first introduced in the 2016 edition.

== Summary ==
=== Men ===
==== Road race ====
Games	Gold	Silver	Bronze
1947	Willy Kemp (LUX)		
1949	Jean Bobet (FRA)		
1950	Jean Bobet (FRA)		
1954	Gustav-Adolf Schur (GER)		
1978	Theo de Rooij (NED)		
1986			
1990			
2006	Malaya van Ruitenbeek (NED)	Tobias Erler (GER)	Michiel van Aelbroeck (BEL)
2008	Robin Chaigneau (NED)	Michael Schweizer (GER)	Malaya van Ruitenbeek (NED)
2014	Petr Vakoč (CZE)	Tim Gebauer (GER)	Emanuel Piaskowy (POL)
2016	Cyrus Monk (AUS)	Maral-erdene Batmunkh (MGL)	Alexander Weifenbach (GER)

==== Time trial ====
Games	Gold	Silver	Bronze
2006	Yvo Kusters (NED)	Mihiel van Aelbroeck (BEL)	Malaya van Ruitenbeek (NED)
2008	Malaya Van Ruitenbeek (NED)	Andrei Krasilnikau (BLR)	Evaldas Šiškevičius (LTU)
2014	Petr Vakoč (CZE)	Tim Gebauer (GER)	Adrian Kurek (POL)

==== Criterium ====
Games	Gold	Silver	Bronze
2016	Ryan Cayubit (PHI)	Alexander Weifenbach (GER)	Cyrus Monk (AUS)

=== Women ===
==== Road race ====
Games	Gold	Silver	Bronze
2006	Ellen van Dijk (NED)	Eva Lutz (GER)	Ludivine Henrion (BEL)
2008	Elise van Hage (NED)	Chantal Blaak (NED)	Annemiek van Vleuten (NED)
2014	Kathrin Hammes (GER)	Katarzyna Solus-Miśkowicz (POL)	Martyna Klekot (POL)
2016	Romy Kasper (GER)	Nikol Płosaj (POL)	Marella Salamat (PHI)

==== Time trial ====
Games	Gold	Silver	Bronze
2006	Loes Gunnewijk (NED)	Ellen van Dijk (NED)	Verena Joos (GER)
2008	Iris Slappendel (NED)	Annemiek van Vleuten (NED)	Loes Markerink (NED)
2014	Martyna Klekot (POL)	Kathrin Hammes (GER)	Monika Brzeźna (GER)

==== Criterium ====
Games	Gold	Silver	Bronze
2016	Romy Kasper (GER)	Nikol Płosaj (POL)	Monika Brzeźna (POL)
