= 1956 Vuelta a España, Stage 1 to Stage 10b =

Cycling race stages

The 1956 Vuelta a España was the 11th edition of Vuelta a España, one of cycling's Grand Tours. The Tour began in Bilbao on 26 April and Stage 10b occurred on 6 May with a stage to Tàrrega. The race finished in Bilbao on 13 May.

== Stage 1 ==
26 April 1956 - Bilbao to Santander, 203 km (126.1 mi)

Route:

Stage 1 result and General Classification after Stage 1

Rank	Rider	Team	Time
1	Rik Van Steenbergen (BEL)	Belgium	4h 52' 56"
2	Miguel Poblet (ESP)	Spain	+ 47"
3	Miguel Bover (ESP)	Spain	s.t.
4	Vicente Iturat (ESP)	Pyrenees	s.t.
5	Salvador Botella (ESP)	Spain	s.t.
6	Jean Dotto (FRA)	France	s.t.
7	Louison Bobet (FRA)	France	s.t.
8	Jean Bobet (FRA)	France	s.t.
9	Gilbert Bauvin (FRA)	France	s.t.
10	Louis Bergaud (FRA)	France	s.t.

== Stage 2 ==
27 April 1956 - Santander to Oviedo, 248 km (154.1 mi)

Route:

Stage 2 result

Rank	Rider	Team	Time
1	Angelo Conterno (ITA)	Italy	8h 14' 15"
2	Miguel Bover (ESP)	Spain	+ 1' 12"
3	René Marigil (ESP)	Spain	+ 2' 09"
4	Arigo Padovan (ITA)	Italy	+ 2' 53"
5	Edgard Sorgeloos (BEL)	Belgium	s.t.
6	Miguel Chacón (ESP)	Pyrenees	s.t.
7	Jean Dotto (FRA)	France	+ 3' 05"
8	Louison Bobet (FRA)	France	s.t.
9	Jean Bobet (FRA)	France	s.t.
10	Gilbert Bauvin (FRA)	France	s.t.

General classification after Stage 2

Rank	Rider	Team	Time
1	Angelo Conterno (ITA)	Italy	14h 01' 41"
2	Miguel Bover (ESP)	Spain	+ 1' 12"
3	Arigo Padovan (ITA)	Italy	+ 2' 53"
4	Edgard Sorgeloos (BEL)	Belgium	s.t.
5	Miguel Chacón (ESP)	Pyrenees	s.t.
6	Jean Dotto (FRA)	France	+ 3' 05"
7	Louison Bobet (FRA)	France	s.t.
8	Jean Bobet (FRA)	France	s.t.
9	Louis Bergaud (FRA)	France	s.t.
10	Claude Le Ber (FRA)	France	s.t.

== Stage 3 ==
28 April 1956 - Oviedo to Valladolid, 175 km (109 mi)

Route:

Stage 3 result

Rank	Rider	Team	Time
1	Miguel Poblet (ESP)	Spain	4h 26' 08"
2	Rik Van Steenbergen (BEL)	Belgium	s.t.
3	Hugo Koblet (SUI)	Switzerland Mixed	s.t.
4	Angelo Conterno (ITA)	Italy	s.t.
5	Louison Bobet (FRA)	France	s.t.
6	Roberto Falaschi (ITA)	Italy	s.t.
7	Jean Bobet (FRA)	France	s.t.
8	Gilbert Bauvin (FRA)	France	s.t.
9	Jean Dotto (FRA)	France	s.t.
10	Brian Robinson (GBR)	Switzerland Mixed	s.t.

General classification after Stage 3

Rank	Rider	Team	Time
1	Angelo Conterno (ITA)	Italy	18h 27' 49"
2	Salvador Botella (ESP)	Spain	+ 3' 05"
3	Federico Bahamontes (ESP)	Spain	s.t.
4	Raymond Impanis (BEL)	Belgium	s.t.
5	Jesús Loroño (ESP)	Spain	s.t.
6	Brian Robinson (GBR)	Switzerland Mixed	s.t.
7	Gilbert Bauvin (FRA)	France	s.t.
8	Louison Bobet (FRA)	France	s.t.
9	Roberto Falaschi (ITA)	Italy	s.t.
10	Jean Bobet (FRA)	France	s.t.

== Stage 4 ==
29 April 1956 - Valladolid to Madrid, 212 km (132 mi)

Route:

Stage 4 result

Rank	Rider	Team	Time
1	Claude Le Ber (FRA)	France	5h 39' 25"
2	Miguel Bover (ESP)	Spain	s.t.
3	Miguel Poblet (ESP)	Spain	+ 10"
4	Arigo Padovan (ITA)	Italy	s.t.
5	Rik Van Steenbergen (BEL)	Belgium	s.t.
6	Louison Bobet (FRA)	France	s.t.
7	Jean Bobet (FRA)	France	s.t.
8	Gilbert Bauvin (FRA)	France	s.t.
9	Roger Walkowiak (FRA)	France	s.t.
10	Federico Bahamontes (ESP)	Spain	s.t.

General classification after Stage 4

Rank	Rider	Team	Time
1	Angelo Conterno (ITA)	Italy	24h 07' 24"
2	Louison Bobet (FRA)	France	+ 3' 05"
3	Jean Bobet (FRA)	France	s.t.
4	Gilbert Bauvin (FRA)	France	s.t.
5	Federico Bahamontes (ESP)	Spain	s.t.
6	Salvador Botella (ESP)	Spain	s.t.
7	Jesús Loroño (ESP)	Spain	s.t.
8	Roberto Falaschi (ITA)	Italy	s.t.
9	Hugo Koblet (SUI)	Switzerland Mixed	s.t.
10	Brian Robinson (GBR)	Switzerland Mixed	s.t.

== Stage 5 ==
30 April 1956 - Madrid to Albacete, 241 km (150 mi)

Route:

Stage 5 result

Rank	Rider	Team	Time
1	Miguel Poblet (ESP)	Spain	6h 04' 15"
2	Rik Van Steenbergen (BEL)	Belgium	s.t.
3	Hugo Koblet (SUI)	Switzerland Mixed	s.t.
4	Gilbert Bauvin (FRA)	France	s.t.
5	Vicente Iturat (ESP)	Pyrenees	s.t.
6	Miguel Bover (ESP)	Spain	s.t.
7	Angelo Conterno (ITA)	Italy	s.t.
8	Jean Bobet (FRA)	France	s.t.
9	Jean Dotto (FRA)	France	s.t.
10	Louison Bobet (FRA)	France	s.t.

General classification after Stage 5

Rank	Rider	Team	Time
1	Angelo Conterno (ITA)	Italy	30h 11' 39"
2	Louison Bobet (FRA)	France	+ 3' 05"
3	Jean Bobet (FRA)	France	s.t.
4	Gilbert Bauvin (FRA)	France	s.t.
5	Federico Bahamontes (ESP)	Spain	s.t.
6	Roberto Falaschi (ITA)	Italy	s.t.
7	Hugo Koblet (SUI)	Switzerland Mixed	s.t.
8	Brian Robinson (GBR)	Switzerland Mixed	s.t.
9	Rik Van Steenbergen (BEL)	Belgium	s.t.
10	Raymond Impanis (BEL)	Belgium	s.t.

== Stage 6 ==
1 May 1956 - Albacete to Alicante, 227 km (141 mi)

Route:

Stage 6 result

Rank	Rider	Team	Time
1	Miguel Poblet (ESP)	Spain	6h 32' 36"
2	Hugo Koblet (SUI)	Switzerland Mixed	s.t.
3	Miguel Bover (ESP)	Spain	s.t.
4	Claude Le Ber (FRA)	France	s.t.
5	Vicente Iturat (ESP)	Pyrenees	s.t.
6	Heinz Müller (FRG)	Switzerland Mixed	s.t.
7	Jean Bobet (FRA)	France	s.t.
8	Gilbert Bauvin (FRA)	France	s.t.
9	Francisco Masip (ESP)	Spain	s.t.
10	Jean Dotto (FRA)	France	s.t.

General classification after Stage 6

Rank	Rider	Team	Time
1	Angelo Conterno (ITA)	Italy	36h 44' 14"
2	Louison Bobet (FRA)	France	+ 3' 05"
3	Jean Bobet (FRA)	France	s.t.
4	Gilbert Bauvin (FRA)	France	s.t.
5	Federico Bahamontes (ESP)	Spain	s.t.
6	Roberto Falaschi (ITA)	Italy	s.t.
7	Hugo Koblet (SUI)	Switzerland Mixed	s.t.
8	Brian Robinson (GBR)	Switzerland Mixed	s.t.
9	Rik Van Steenbergen (BEL)	Belgium	s.t.
10	Raymond Impanis (BEL)	Belgium	s.t.

== Stage 7 ==
2 May 1956 - Alicante to Valencia, 182 km (113 mi)

Route:

Stage 7 result

Rank	Rider	Team	Time
1	Rik Van Steenbergen (BEL)	Belgium	5h 15' 56"
2	Miguel Poblet (ESP)	Spain	s.t.
3	Hugo Koblet (SUI)	Switzerland Mixed	s.t.
4	Miguel Bover (ESP)	Spain	s.t.
5	Gilbert Bauvin (FRA)	France	s.t.
6	Carmelo Morales (ESP)	Cantabria	s.t.
7	Angelo Conterno (ITA)	Italy	s.t.
8	Louison Bobet (FRA)	France	s.t.
9	Jean Bobet (FRA)	France	s.t.
10	Claude Le Ber (FRA)	France	s.t.

General classification after Stage 7

Rank	Rider	Team	Time
1	Angelo Conterno (ITA)	Italy	42h 00' 10"
2	Rik Van Steenbergen (BEL)	Belgium	+ 3' 05"
3	Gilbert Bauvin (FRA)	France	s.t.
4	Hugo Koblet (SUI)	Switzerland Mixed	s.t.
5	Jean Bobet (FRA)	France	s.t.
6	Louison Bobet (FRA)	France	s.t.
7	Roberto Falaschi (ITA)	Italy	s.t.
8	Brian Robinson (GBR)	Switzerland Mixed	s.t.
9	Federico Bahamontes (ESP)	Spain	s.t.
10	Raymond Impanis (BEL)	Belgium	s.t.

== Stage 8 ==
3 May 1956 - Valencia to Tarragona, 249 km (155 mi)

Route:

Stage 8 result

Rank	Rider	Team	Time
1	Rik Van Steenbergen (BEL)	Belgium	7h 35' 19"
2	Miguel Poblet (ESP)	Spain	s.t.
3	Hugo Koblet (SUI)	Switzerland Mixed	s.t.
4	Gilbert Bauvin (FRA)	France	s.t.
5	Arigo Padovan (ITA)	Italy	s.t.
6	Miguel Bover (ESP)	Spain	s.t.
7	Oskar von Büren (SUI)	Switzerland Mixed	s.t.
8	Edgard Sorgeloos (BEL)	Belgium	s.t.
9	Adolfo Cruz (ESP)	Cantabria	s.t.
10	Salvador Botella (ESP)	Spain	s.t.

General classification after Stage 8

Rank	Rider	Team	Time
1	Angelo Conterno (ITA)	Italy	49h 35' 29"
2	Rik Van Steenbergen (BEL)	Belgium	+ 3' 05"
3	Gilbert Bauvin (FRA)	France	s.t.
4	Hugo Koblet (SUI)	Switzerland Mixed	s.t.
5	Jean Bobet (FRA)	France	s.t.
6	Louison Bobet (FRA)	France	s.t.
7	Roberto Falaschi (ITA)	Italy	s.t.
8	Brian Robinson (GBR)	Switzerland Mixed	s.t.
9	Federico Bahamontes (ESP)	Spain	s.t.
10	Raymond Impanis (BEL)	Belgium	s.t.

== Stage 9 ==
5 May 1956 - Tarragona to Barcelona, 163 km (101 mi)

Route:

Stage 9 result

Rank	Rider	Team	Time
1	Hugo Koblet (SUI)	Switzerland Mixed	3h 08' 47"
2	Rik Van Steenbergen (BEL)	Belgium	s.t.
3	Miguel Poblet (ESP)	Spain	s.t.
4	Arigo Padovan (ITA)	Italy	s.t.
5	Gilbert Bauvin (FRA)	France	s.t.
6	Heinz Müller (FRG)	Switzerland Mixed	s.t.
7	Jean Dotto (FRA)	France	s.t.
8	Louison Bobet (FRA)	France	s.t.
9	Jean Bobet (FRA)	France	s.t.
10	Maurice Lampre (FRA)	France	s.t.

General classification after Stage 9

Rank	Rider	Team	Time
1	Angelo Conterno (ITA)	Italy	52h 44' 16"
2	Rik Van Steenbergen (BEL)	Belgium	+ 3' 05"
3	Hugo Koblet (SUI)	Switzerland Mixed	s.t.
4	Gilbert Bauvin (FRA)	France	s.t.
5	Jean Bobet (FRA)	France	s.t.
6	Federico Bahamontes (ESP)	Spain	s.t.
7	Louison Bobet (FRA)	France	s.t.
8	Roberto Falaschi (ITA)	Italy	s.t.
9	Brian Robinson (GBR)	Switzerland Mixed	s.t.
10	Raymond Impanis (BEL)	Belgium	s.t.

== Stage 10a ==
6 May 1956 - Barcelona to Barcelona, 21 km (13 mi) (TTT)

Stage 10a result

Rank	Team	Time
1	France	1h 34' 38"
2	Spain	+ 13"
3	Italy	+ 37"
4	Pyrenees	+ 2' 58"
5	Belgium	+ 3' 04"
6	Switzerland Mixed	+ 4' 02"
7	Cantabria	+ 4' 04"
8	Central-South	+ 8' 58"
9	Mediterranean	+ 11' 29"

== Stage 10b ==
6 May 1956 - Barcelona to Tàrrega, 112 km (70 mi)

Route:

Stage 10b result

Rank	Rider	Team	Time
1	Gilbert Bauvin (FRA)	France	2h 56' 32"
2	Salvador Botella (ESP)	Spain	s.t.
3	Jesús Loroño (ESP)	Spain	s.t.
4	Angelo Conterno (ITA)	Italy	s.t.
5	René Marigil (ESP)	Spain	+ 1' 00"
6	Raymond Impanis (BEL)	Belgium	s.t.
7	Miguel Chacón (ESP)	Pyrenees	s.t.
8	Federico Bahamontes (ESP)	Spain	s.t.
9	[[[Manuel Rodríguez Barros|Manuel Rodríguez]] (ESP)	Cantabria	s.t.
10	Emilio Rodríguez (ESP)	Cantabria	s.t.

General classification after Stage 10b

Rank	Rider	Team	Time
1	Angelo Conterno (ITA)	Italy	56h 12' 36"
2	Gilbert Bauvin (FRA)	France	+ 2' 53"
3	Federico Bahamontes (ESP)	Spain	+ 3' 44"
4	Jesús Loroño (ESP)	Spain	+ 4' 16"
5	Salvador Botella (ESP)	Spain	s.t.
6	Raymond Impanis (BEL)	Belgium	+ 4' 41"
7	Jean Bobet (FRA)	France	+ 7' 45"
8	Louison Bobet (FRA)	France	s.t.
9	Roberto Falaschi (ITA)	Italy	+ 7' 54"
10	Hugo Koblet (SUI)	Switzerland Mixed	+ 8' 22"
