= 1956 Vuelta a España, Stage 11 to Stage 17 =

Cycling race stages

The 1956 Vuelta a España was the 11th edition of Vuelta a España, one of cycling's Grand Tours. The Tour began in Bilbao on 26 April and Stage 10b occurred on 6 May with a stage to Tàrrega. The race finished in Bilbao on 13 May.

== Stage 11 ==
7 May 1956 - Tàrrega to Zaragoza, 238 km (147.9 mi)

Route:

Stage 11 result

Rank	Rider	Team	Time
1	Rik Van Steenbergen (BEL)	Belgium	7h 30' 09"
2	Miguel Poblet (ESP)	Spain	s.t.
3	Heinz Müller (FRG)	Switzerland Mixed	s.t.
4	Gilbert Bauvin (FRA)	France	s.t.
5	Miguel Bover (ESP)	Spain	s.t.
6	Oskar von Büren (SUI)	Switzerland Mixed	s.t.
7	Jesús Galdeano (ESP)	Spain	s.t.
8	Jose Escolano (ESP)	Pyrenees	s.t.
9	Jean Dotto (FRA)	France	s.t.
10	Louison Bobet (FRA)	France	s.t.

General classification after Stage 11

Rank	Rider	Team	Time
1	Angelo Conterno (ITA)	Italy	63h 42' 42"
2	Gilbert Bauvin (FRA)	France	+ 2' 56"
3	Federico Bahamontes (ESP)	Spain	+ 3' 47"
4	Salvador Botella (ESP)	Spain	+ 4' 19"
5	Jesús Loroño (ESP)	Spain	+ 4' 22"
6	Raymond Impanis (BEL)	Belgium	+ 4' 44"
7	Jean Bobet (FRA)	France	+ 7' 48"
8	Louison Bobet (FRA)	France	s.t.
9	Roberto Falaschi (ITA)	Italy	+ 7' 57"
10	Rik Van Steenbergen (BEL)	Belgium	+ 8' 46"

== Stage 12 ==
8 May 1956 - Zaragoza to Bayonne, 274 km (170.3 mi)

Route:

Stage 12 result

Rank	Rider	Team	Time
1	Giancarlo Astrua (ITA)	Italy	9h 18' 10"
2	Jesús Galdeano (ESP)	Spain	+ 5' 18"
3	Antonio Jiménez Quiles (ESP)	Centre-South	+ 9' 01"
4	René Marigil (ESP)	Spain	s.t.
5	Miguel Bover (ESP)	Spain	+ 17' 38"
6	Vicente Iturat (ESP)	Pyrenees	s.t.
7	Rudi Theissen (FRG)	Switzerland Mixed	s.t.
8	Rik Van Steenbergen (BEL)	Belgium	s.t.
9	Jean Dotto (FRA)	France	s.t.
10	Jean Bobet (FRA)	France	s.t.

General classification after Stage 12

Rank	Rider	Team	Time
1	Angelo Conterno (ITA)	Italy	73h 18' 30"
2	Giancarlo Astrua (ITA)	Italy	+ 36"
3	Gilbert Bauvin (FRA)	France	+ 2' 56"
4	Federico Bahamontes (ESP)	Spain	+ 3' 47"
5	Salvador Botella (ESP)	Spain	+ 4' 19"
6	Jesús Loroño (ESP)	Spain	s.t.
7	Raymond Impanis (BEL)	Belgium	+ 4' 44"
8	Jean Bobet (FRA)	France	+ 7' 48"
9	Rik Van Steenbergen (BEL)	Belgium	+ 8' 46"
10	Brian Robinson (GBR)	Switzerland Mixed	+ 8' 50"

== Stage 13a ==
9 May 1956 - Bayonne to Irun, 43 km (27 mi) (ITT)

Route:

Stage 13a result

Rank	Rider	Team	Time
1	Claude Le Ber (FRA)	France	1h 16' 40"
2	Federico Bahamontes (ESP)	Spain	+ 1' 59"
3	Miguel Bover (ESP)	Spain	s.t.
4	Raymond Impanis (BEL)	Belgium	+ 2' 34"
5	Nino Defilippis (ITA)	Italy	s.t.
6	Jesús Loroño (ESP)	Spain	+ 2' 51"
7	Gilbert Bauvin (FRA)	France	+ 3' 07"
8	Jean Bobet (FRA)	France	+ 4' 32"
9	Miguel Chacón (ESP)	Pyrenees	+ 4' 38"
10	Angelo Conterno (ITA)	Italy	+ 5' 38"

== Stage 13b ==
9 May 1956 - Irun to Pamplona, 111 km (69 mi)

Route:

Stage 13b result

Rank	Rider	Team	Time
1	Roger Walkowiak (FRA)	France	3h 23' 13"
2	José Serra (ESP)	Pyrenees	+ 1' 53"
3	Rik Van Steenbergen (BEL)	Belgium	+ 7' 18"
4	Vicente Iturat (ESP)	Pyrenees	s.t.
5	Gilbert Bauvin (FRA)	France	s.t.
6	Giovanni Pettinati (ITA)	Italy	s.t.
7	Rudi Theissen (FRG)	Switzerland Mixed	s.t.
8	Angelo Conterno (ITA)	Italy	s.t.
9	Claude Le Ber (FRA)	France	s.t.
10	Jean Dotto (FRA)	France	s.t.

General classification after Stage 13b

Rank	Rider	Team	Time
1	Angelo Conterno (ITA)	Italy	78h 11' 19"
2	Federico Bahamontes (ESP)	Spain	+ 8"
3	Gilbert Bauvin (FRA)	France	+ 25"
4	Raymond Impanis (BEL)	Belgium	+ 1' 26"
5	Jesús Loroño (ESP)	Spain	+ 1' 35"
6	Salvador Botella (ESP)	Spain	+ 5' 02"
7	Jean Bobet (FRA)	France	+ 6' 42"
8	Miguel Chacón (ESP)	Pyrenees	+ 8' 03"
9	Brian Robinson (GBR)	Switzerland Mixed	+ 9' 06"
10	Rik Van Steenbergen (BEL)	Belgium	+ 9' 07"

== Stage 14 ==
10 May 1956 - Pamplona to San Sebastián, 195 km (121 mi)

Route:

Stage 14 result

Rank	Rider	Team	Time
1	Rik Van Steenbergen (BEL)	Belgium	6h 53' 22"
2	Vicente Iturat (ESP)	Pyrenees	s.t.
3	Rudi Theissen (FRG)	Switzerland Mixed	s.t.
4	Gilbert Bauvin (FRA)	France	s.t.
5	Arigo Padovan (ITA)	Italy	s.t.
6	Claude Le Ber (FRA)	France	s.t.
7	Francisco Masip (ESP)	Spain	s.t.
8	Brian Robinson (GBR)	Switzerland Mixed	s.t.
9	Jean Dotto (FRA)	France	s.t.
10	Jean Bobet (FRA)	France	s.t.

General classification after Stage 14

Rank	Rider	Team	Time
1	Angelo Conterno (ITA)	Italy	85h 04' 41"
2	Federico Bahamontes (ESP)	Spain	+ 8"
3	Gilbert Bauvin (FRA)	France	+ 25"
4	Raymond Impanis (BEL)	Belgium	+ 1' 26"
5	Jesús Loroño (ESP)	Spain	+ 1' 32"
6	Salvador Botella (ESP)	Spain	+ 5' 02"
7	Jean Bobet (FRA)	France	+ 6' 42"
8	Miguel Chacón (ESP)	Pyrenees	+ 8' 03"
9	Brian Robinson (GBR)	Switzerland Mixed	+ 9' 06"
10	Rik Van Steenbergen (BEL)	Belgium	+ 9' 07"

== Stage 15 ==
11 May 1956 - San Sebastián to Bilbao, 225 km (140 mi)

Route:

Stage 15 result

Rank	Rider	Team	Time
1	Nino Defilippis (ITA)	Italy	7h 07' 28"
2	Rik Van Steenbergen (BEL)	Belgium	+ 2' 18"
3	Edgard Sorgeloos (BEL)	Belgium	s.t.
4	Bernardo Ruiz (ESP)	Spain	s.t.
5	Jesús Loroño (ESP)	Spain	s.t.
6	Carmelo Morales (ESP)	Cantabria	s.t.
7	Federico Bahamontes (ESP)	Spain	+ 3' 27"
8	Juan Bibiloni (ESP)	s.t.	
9	Angelo Conterno (ITA)	Italy	s.t.
10	Miguel Chacón (ESP)	Pyrenees	s.t.

General classification after Stage 15

Rank	Rider	Team	Time
1	Angelo Conterno (ITA)	Italy	92h 15' 16"
2	Federico Bahamontes (ESP)	Spain	+ 8"
3	Jesús Loroño (ESP)	Spain	+ 43"
4	Raymond Impanis (BEL)	Belgium	+ 1' 26"
5	Miguel Chacón (ESP)	Pyrenees	+ 8' 03"
6	Gilbert Bauvin (FRA)	France	+ 8' 09"
7	Rik Van Steenbergen (BEL)	Belgium	+ 8' 18"
8	Brian Robinson (GBR)	Switzerland Mixed	+ 9' 06"
9	Manuel Rodríguez (ESP)	Cantabria	+ 12' 33"
10	José Serra (ESP)	Pyrenees	+ 15' 55"

== Stage 16 ==
12 May 1956 - Bilbao to Vitoria, 207 km (129 mi)

Route:

Stage 16 result

Rank	Rider	Team	Time
1	Benigno Azpuru (ESP)	Cantabria	6h 55' 32"
2	Arigo Padovan (ITA)	Italy	+ 8' 52"
3	Rik Van Steenbergen (BEL)	Belgium	+ 9' 14"
4	Angelo Conterno (ITA)	Italy	s.t.
5	Jesús Loroño (ESP)	Spain	s.t.
6	Nino Defilippis (ITA)	Italy	s.t.
7	Giancarlo Astrua (ITA)	Italy	+ 10' 02"
8	Raymond Impanis (BEL)	Belgium	s.t.
9	Miguel Chacón (ESP)	Pyrenees	s.t.
10	Giuseppe Buratti (ITA)	Italy	s.t.

General classification after Stage 16

Rank	Rider	Team	Time
1	Angelo Conterno (ITA)	Italy	99h 20' 02"
2	Jesús Loroño (ESP)	Spain	+ 43"
3	Raymond Impanis (BEL)	Belgium	+ 2' 24"
4	Federico Bahamontes (ESP)	Spain	+ 3' 57"
5	Rik Van Steenbergen (BEL)	Belgium	+ 8' 18"
6	Miguel Chacón (ESP)	Pyrenees	+ 9' 00"
7	Gilbert Bauvin (FRA)	France	+ 15' 48"
8	Brian Robinson (GBR)	Switzerland Mixed	+ 16' 42"
9	José Serra (ESP)	Pyrenees	+ 19' 44"
10	Manuel Rodríguez (ESP)	Cantabria	+ 20' 09"

== Stage 17 ==
13 May 1956 - Vitoria to Bilbao, 190 km (120 mi)

Route:

Stage 17 result

Rank	Rider	Team	Time
1	Rik Van Steenbergen (BEL)	Belgium	6h 17' 20"
2	Vicente Iturat (ESP)	Pyrenees	s.t.
3	Maurice Lampre (FRA)	France	s.t.
4	Edgard Sorgeloos (BEL)	Belgium	s.t.
5	Raymond Impanis (BEL)	Belgium	s.t.
6	Carmelo Morales (ESP)	Cantabria	s.t.
7	Francisco Masip (ESP)	Spain	s.t.
8	Federico Bahamontes (ESP)	Spain	s.t.
9	Jesús Loroño (ESP)	Spain	s.t.
10	René Marigil (ESP)	Spain	s.t.

General classification after Stage 17

Rank	Rider	Team	Time
1	Angelo Conterno (ITA)	Italy	105h 37' 52"
2	Jesús Loroño (ESP)	Spain	+ 13"
3	Raymond Impanis (BEL)	Belgium	+ 1' 53"
4	Federico Bahamontes (ESP)	Spain	+ 3' 27"
5	Rik Van Steenbergen (BEL)	Belgium	+ 7' 48"
6	Miguel Chacón (ESP)	Pyrenees	+ 8' 30"
7	Gilbert Bauvin (FRA)	France	+ 19' 22"
8	Brian Robinson (GBR)	Switzerland Mixed	+ 20' 36"
9	José Serra (ESP)	Pyrenees	+ 23' 38"
10	Manuel Rodríguez (ESP)	Cantabria	+ 24' 55"
