= International Erasmus Games =

European multi-sport event

- Status: Active
- Genre: Multi-sport event
- Frequency: Annual
- Location: International
- Inaugurated: 2015; 11 years ago
- Organiser: Erasmus Student Network
- Website: International Erasmus Games

The International Erasmus Games is a multi-sport event held annually for members of the Erasmus Student Network, a student organisation for students on exchange in Europe. Held annually in European cities home to Erasmus Student Network local sections and organised by volunteers, the games bring together hundreds of participants from multiple countries worldwide.

A conception of ESN Poland and ESN Italy, the first International Erasmus Games were hosted in Kraków, Poland, in 2015. Since then, the games have had seven editions hosted in seven cities in six countries. The eighth edition of the games are set to be hosted in Wrocław, Poland, from 30 May to 2 June 2024.

== History ==
The International Erasmus Games were initiated by a coordinated effort of ESN Poland and ESN Italy. The first edition of the games, hosted in Kraków, Poland, was called ESN Team. The second edition of the games were hosted in Milan, Italy. Since the second edition, the games have been called the International Erasmus Games. The regular three sports of 3x3 basketball, futsal, and volleyball were established after they were played at both of the first two editions of the games.

The third edition of games was hosted in Porto, Portugal, in 2017 and featured tennis in addition to the regular three sports. The fourth edition of the games, hosted in Niš, Serbia, also featured tennis. Paris, France, hosted the fifth edition of the games in 2019, which saw a return to the regular three sports being played. That year, the tournament welcomed 350 participants from 20 countries.

Future editions of the International Erasmus Games were cancelled due to the COVID-19 pandemic. The International Erasmus Games returned following the COVID-19 pandemic with the sixth edition of the games in Coimbra, Portugal, in 2022. The sixth and seventh editions of the games, the latter of which were hosted in Madrid, Spain, featured athletics in addition to the regular three sports.

The eighth edition of the games is set to be hosted in Wrocław, Poland, from 30 May to 2 June 2024.

== Editions ==
Host cities of the International Erasmus Games

Year	Games	Host	Date	Sports	Athletes	Ref
2015	1	Kraków, Poland	26–29 March	3	300	
2016	2	Milan, Italy	5–8 May	3	320	
2017	3	Porto, Portugal	18–21 May	4	200	
2018	4	Niš, Serbia	17–20 May	4	250	
2019	5	Paris, France	2–5 May	3	350	
2022	6	Coimbra, Portugal	12–15 May	4	250	
2023	7	Madrid, Spain	18–21 May	4	200	
2024	8	Wrocław, Poland	30 May – 2 June	3	TBD	
2025	9	Milan, Italy	29 May – 1 June	4	TBD	

== Sports ==
- Athletics (2022–2023, 2025)
- Basketball (3x3)
- Futsal
- Volleyball

=== Former sports ===
- Table tennis (2024)
- Tennis (2017–2018)

== See also ==
- Erasmus Student Network
- European Universities Games
- European Universities Championships
- FISU World University Games
- World Scholar-Athlete Games
- University International Sports Festival
- South American University Athletics Championships
- SELL Student Games
- EDHEC Sailing Cup
- MotoStudent
- GEM Altigliss Challenge
- Batavierenrace
- All-Africa University Games
- World Interuniversity Games
- ASEAN University Games
- FISU America Games
- University and college sport
