= 2008 World University Cycling Championship =

- Venue: Nijmegen, Netherlands
- Date: 21–25 May 2008
- Nations participating: 25
- Events: 8

The 2008 World University Cycling Championship is the 5th Word University Cycling Championship sponsored by the International University Sports Federation (FISU) and sanctioned by the Union Cycliste Internationale (UCI). The championship took place in Nijmegen, Netherlands, from 21 to 25 May 2008. Prague and Bangkok were also candidate cities to organize the championship. The NOC*NSF chairman Erica Terpstra opened he World Championships at the opening ceremony on 21 May. Athletes from 25 countries competed in the disciplines mountain bike cross-country, mountain bike marathon, individual time trial and road race. It was the first time in student sports that there was held a World Championship Mountain Biking.

== Participation ==
Each country was allowed to enter a maximum of 20 competitors: 4 men and women in the road race events and 6 men and women in the mountain bike events. A person was allowed to participate as a competitor if he/she was born between 1 January 1980 and 31 December 1990 and was a full-time student at a university or similar institute or had obtained their academic degree in the year preceding the event.

== Cycling disciplines ==
The championship contained events in following sports:

=== Road cycling (road race, time trial) ===
The road cycling competitions at the 2008 World University Cycling Championship took place on May 23 and 25, 2008. Athletes from 23 different countries competed in both the road race and the individual time trial events. The competitions took place in the countryside of Nijmeten with un-Dutch difference in altitude and was along the dikes of the river Waal. You can view on YouTube the road race course and the time trial course.

=== Mountain biking (cross-country, marathon) ===
The mountain bike competitions at the 2008 World University Cycling Championship were held at 22 and 24 May 2008. Athletes competed in the disciplines cross-country and marathon. 26 men athletes competed in the marathon and 32 in the cross-country. The competitions took place in the wooded areas of Groesbeek, nearby the German Reichswald. The mountain bike track was specially made for this championship.

== Schedule ==
Wednesday, 21 May 2008

- Opening ceremony

Thursday, 22 May 2008

- Mountain bike: women's cross-country
- Mountain bike: men's cross-country

Friday, 23 May 2008

- Road cycling: women's time trial, 34.8 km
- Road cycling: men's time trial, 34.8 km

Saturday, 24 May 2008

- Mountain bike: women's marathon
- Mountain bike: men's marathon, 104 km

Sunday 25 May 2008

- Road cycling: women's road race, 96.3 km
- Road cycling: men's road race, 160.5 km

== Events summary ==
=== Road Cycling ===
Event	Gold		Silver		Bronze	
Men's events
Road Race details	Robin Chaigneau; Netherlands	4h 03' 54"	Michael Schweizer; Germany	+ 57"	Malaya Van Ruitenbeek; Netherlands	+ 57"
Time trial details	Malaya Van Ruitenbeek; Netherlands	45' 56.20"	Andrei Krasilnikau; Belarus	+ 29.02"	Evaldas Šiškevičius; Lithuania	+ 34.24"
Women's events
Road Race	Elise van Hage; Netherlands	2h 44'25"	Chantal Blaak; Netherlands	+ 1'01"	Annemiek van Vleuten; Netherlands	+ 2'38"
Time trial details	Iris Slappendel; Netherlands	51' 03.83"	Annemiek van Vleuten; Netherlands	+ 6.97"	Loes Markerink; Netherlands	+ 50.96"

=== Mountainbiking ===
Event	Gold		Silver		Bronze	
Men's events
Cross-country details	Till Marx; Switzerland	1h 52' 48"	Jan Skarnitzl; Czech Republic	+ 34"	Niels Wubben; Netherlands	+ 42"
Marathon						
Women's events
Cross-country details	Caroline Mani; France	1h 27' 27"	Maaris Meier; Estonia	s.t.	Ingrid Bosscha; Netherlands	+ 49"
Marathon						

== Medal table ==
The mountain bike marathon events are not included in the medal table.

Rank	Nation	Gold	Silver	Bronze	Total
1	Netherlands (NED)	4	2	5	11
2	France (FRA)	1	0	0	1
2	Switzerland (SUI)	1	0	0	1
4	Belarus (BLR)	0	1	0	1
4	Czech Republic (CZE)	0	1	0	1
4	Estonia (EST)	0	1	0	1
4	Germany (GER)	0	1	0	1
8	Lithuania (LTU)	0	0	1	1
Totals (8 entries)		6	6	6	18
