= 2016 World University Cycling Championship – Women's road race =

Women's Road Race
2016 World University Cycling Championship

Race details
- Dates: 18 March 2016
- Stages: 1
- Distance: 80 km (49.71 mi)
- Winning time: 2h 42' 48"

Medalists
	Gold	Romy Kasper (GER)
	Silver	Nikol Płosaj (POL)
	Bronze	Marella Salamat (PHI)

The women's road race at the 2016 World University Cycling Championship took place in Tagaytay, Philippines on 18 March 2016. The race was 80 km long. 26 riders from 13 countries registered for the race. Half of the riders did not finish.

== Final classification ==
Rank	Rider	Time	Behind
1st place, gold medalist(s)	Romy Kasper (GER)	2h 42' 48"	—
2nd place, silver medalist(s)	Nikol Płosaj (POL)	2h 47' 00"	+ 4' 12"
3rd place, bronze medalist(s)	Marella Salamat (PHI)	2h 47' 01"	+ 4' 13"
4	Monika Brzeźna (POL)	2h 48' 02"	+ 5' 14"
5	Marcela Rubiano (CRC)	3h 05' 51"	+ 23' 03"
6	Nozomi Saito (JPN)	3h 05' 53"	+ 23' 06"
7	Elmari Renate De Wet (RSA)	3h 05' 51"	+ 23' 43"
8	Shoko Kashiki (JPN)	3h 07' 03"	+ 24' 15"
9	Sarah Scharbach (GER)	3h 10' 07"	+ 27' 19"
10	Avegail Rombaon (PHI)	3h 10' 08"	+ 27' 20"
11	Daisi Rist (EST)	3h 10' 08"	+ 27' 21"
12	Ayako Nakai (JPN)	3h 10' 08"	+ 27' 39"
13	Andrea Deboer (RSA)	3h 10' 08"	+ 41' 51"
-	Madeline Steele (AUS)	DNF	
-	Iori Tani (JPN)	DNF	
-	Laureta Eva (MAS)	DNF	
-	Li Jinming (CHN)	DNF	
-	Mae Lang (EST)	DNF	
-	Jeong Euna (KOR)	DNF	
-	Song Youngran (KOR)	DNF	
-	Kim Taenam (KOR)	DNF	
-	Liu Xinran (CHN)	DNF	
-	Mi Limin (CHN)	DNF	
-	Luo Binni (CHN)	DNF	
-	Chen Zijun (CHN)	DNF	
-	Ana Katrina Angelo (PHI)	DNF	

Source; DNF: Did not finish
