= 2018 World University Cycling Championship =

- Venue: Braga and Guimarães, Portugal

The 2018 World University Cycling Championship was the 8th edition of the World University Cycling Championship. The tournament was hosted by the Portuguese Academic University Sports Federation (FADU), sponsored by the International University Sports Federation (FISU) and sanctioned by the Union Cycliste Internationale (UCI).
