= Cycling at the 1949 Student World Championships =

- Date: 1949

The 1949 World University Cycling Championship was a World University Cycling Championship not organized by the International University Sports Federation (FISU). The championship consisted of a road cycling road race event and a team pursuit. Both were won by Jean Bobet from France.

== Events summary ==
=== Road Cycling ===
Event	Gold	Silver	Bronze
Men's event
Road Race	Jean Bobet; France		

=== Track Cycling ===
Event	Gold	Silver	Bronze
Men's event
Team Pursuit	Jean Bobet; France		
