= 1956 Vuelta a España =

Race details
- Dates: 26 April – 13 May
- Stages: 17
- Distance: 3,537 km (2,198 mi)
- Winning time: 105h 37' 52"

Results
| Jersey awarded to the overall winner | Winner | Angelo Conterno (ITA) |
| | Second | Jesús Loroño (ESP) |
| | Third | Raymond Impanis (BEL) |
| Jersey awarded to the points classification winner | Points | Rik Van Steenbergen (BEL) |
| | Mountains | Nino Defilippis (ITA) |

The 11th Vuelta a España (Tour of Spain), a long-distance bicycle stage race and one of the three grand tours, was held from 26 April to 13 May 1956. It consisted of 17 stages covering a total of 3,531 km (2,194 mi), and was won by Angelo Conterno of the Bianchi cycling team. Rik Van Steenbergen won the points classification and Nino Defilippis won the mountains classification.

The race was run with national teams of France, Spain, Switzerland and Belgium, and an additional four regional Spanish teams. Each fielded 10 cyclists, for a total of 90.

== Route ==
List of stages
| Stage | Date | Course | Distance | Type | Winner |
|---|---|---|---|---|---|
| 1 | 26 April | Bilbao to Santander | 203 km (126 mi) | | Rik Van Steenbergen (BEL) |
| 2 | 27 April | Santander to Oviedo | 248 km (154 mi) | | Angelo Conterno (ITA) |
| 3 | 28 April | Oviedo to Valladolid | 175 km (109 mi) | | Miguel Poblet (ESP) |
| 4 | 29 April | Valladolid to Madrid | 212 km (132 mi) | | Claude Le Ber (FRA) |
| 5 | 30 April | Madrid to Albacete | 241 km (150 mi) | | Miguel Poblet (ESP) |
| 6 | 1 May | Albacete to Alicante | 227 km (141 mi) | | Miguel Poblet (ESP) |
| 7 | 2 May | Alicante to Valencia | 182 km (113 mi) | | Rik Van Steenbergen (BEL) |
| 8 | 3 May | Valencia to Tarragona | 249 km (155 mi) | | Rik Van Steenbergen (BEL) |
| 9 | 5 May | Tarragona to Barcelona | 163 km (101 mi) | | Hugo Koblet (SUI) |
| 10a | 6 May | Barcelona to Barcelona | 21 km (13 mi) | Team time trial | France |
| 10b | 6 May | Barcelona to Tàrrega | 112 km (70 mi) | | Gilbert Bauvin (FRA) |
| 11 | 7 May | Tàrrega to Zaragoza | 238 km (148 mi) | | Rik Van Steenbergen (BEL) |
| 12 | 8 May | Zaragoza to Bayonne (France) | 274 km (170 mi) | | Giancarlo Astrua (ITA) |
| 13a | 9 May | Bayonne (France) to Irun | 43 km (27 mi) | Individual time trial | Claude Le Ber (FRA) |
| 13b | 9 May | Irun to Pamplona | 111 km (69 mi) | | Roger Walkowiak (FRA) |
| 14 | 10 May | Pamplona to San Sebastián | 195 km (121 mi) | | Rik Van Steenbergen (BEL) |
| 15 | 11 May | San Sebastián to Bilbao | 225 km (140 mi) | | Nino Defilippis (ITA) |
| 16 | 12 May | Bilbao to Vitoria | 207 km (129 mi) | | Benigno Azpuru (ESP) |
| 17 | 13 May | Vitoria to Bilbao | 190 km (118 mi) | | Rik Van Steenbergen (BEL) |
| | Total | | 3,531 km (2,194 mi) | | |

== Results ==
Final general classification
| Rank | Rider | Team | Time |
|---|---|---|---|
| 1 | (Italy) Angelo Conterno | Bianchi | 105h 37' 52" |
| 2 | (Spain) Jesús Loroño | | + 13" |
| 3 | (Belgium) Raymond Impanis | Elvé-Peugeot | + 1' 54" |
| 4 | (Spain) Federico Bahamontes | | + 3' 27" |
| 5 | (Belgium) Rik Van Steenbergen | | + 7' 48" |
| 6 | (Spain) Miguel Chacón Díaz | Elvé-Peugeot | + 8' 30" |
| 7 | (France) Gilbert Bauvin | | + 19' 18" |
| 8 | (United Kingdom) Brian Robinson | | + 20' 36" |
| 9 | (Spain) José Serra Gil | | + 23' 38" |
| 10 | (Spain) Manuel Rodríguez Barros | | + 24' 55" |
| 11 | (Spain) Emilio Rodríguez | | |
| 12 | (Italy) Giancarlo Astrua | | |
| 13 | (Italy) Giuseppe Buratti | Bianchi | |
| 14 | (Spain) Carmelo Morales Erostarbe | | |
| 15 | (Spain) Cosme Barrutia | | |
| 16 | (Belgium) Hilaire Couvreur | | |
| 17 | (Spain) Juan Bibiloni | | |
| 18 | (Italy) Nino Defilippis | Bianchi | |
| 19 | (Italy) Arrigo Padovan | | |
| 20 | (Spain) Antonio Barrutia | | |
| 21 | (Spain) René Marigil | | |
| 22 | (Belgium) Edgard Sorgeloos | | |
| 23 | (Spain) Vicente Iturat | | |
| 24 | (Italy) Giovanni Pettinati | Bianchi | |
| 25 | (Switzerland) Remo Pianezzi | | |
