= Bobet =

Bobet may refer to:

in people:

- Jean Bobet (born 1930), French cyclist
- Louison Bobet (1925-1983), French cyclist

in other:

- A flag which monitors which way the wind is blowing, like a weather vane
- Louison Bobet (bicycles), line of bicycles produced by Louison Bobet
