= 1950 World University Cycling Championship =

- Events: 2

The 1950 World University Cycling Championship was a World University Cycling Championship not organized by the International University Sports Federation (FISU). The championship consisted of a road cycling road race event. Jean Bobet from France defended successfully his title and became again World University Cycling Champion.

== Events summary ==
=== Road Cycling ===
Event	Gold	Silver	Bronze
Men's event
Road Race	Jean Bobet; France		
