= Ryan Cayubit =

Filipino professional road bicycle racer

Personal information
- Full name: Boots Ryan Cayubit
- Born: 7 June 1991 (age 35)

Cycling career
- Sport: Cycling
- Current team: Go for Gold Philippines
- Discipline: Road
- Role: Rider

Amateur team
- 2017–2018: Team Go for Gold

Professional teams
- 2013–2016: 7 Eleven Presented by Road Bike Philippines
- 2019–2020: Team Go for Gold
- 2022–: Go for Gold Philippines
Medal record
Men's road cycling
Representing Philippines
World University Cycling Championship
Gold medal – first place	2016 Tagaytay	Men's criterium

Boots Ryan Cayubit (born 7 June 1991) is a Filipino professional road bicycle racer, who currently rides for UCI Continental team Go for Gold Philippines. He is also a gold medalist at the 2016 World University Cycling Championship held in Tagaytay by winning the men's criterium event by points.

== Personal life ==
As of March 2016, Cayubit is attending St. Clare College of Caloocan as a sophomore student taking up a course on Business Administration.

== Major results ==
2015
8th Overall Tour of Borneo
2016
1st Criterium, World University Cycling Championships
