= 1978 World University Cycling Championship =

- Venue: Antwerp, Belgium
- Date: 1978
- Events: 2

The 1978 World University Cycling Championship was the 1st Word University Cycling Championship sponsored by the International University Sports Federation (FISU) and sanctioned by the Union Cycliste Internationale (UCI). The championship was hosted by the Belgian city Antwerp. Male athletes contested a road race and the individual pursuit on the track.

== Road cycling ==
The men's road race took place in Bornem in the province of Antwerp. Both the start and finish were in Bornem. The event was won by Theo de Rooij from the Netherlands who became the first World University Road Champion.

== Track cycling ==
Male athletes competed on the track in the 4000 m individual pursuit. The Jean-Jacques Rebière from France won the competition and became the first World University Track Champion.

== Events summary ==
=== Road cycling ===
| Event | Gold | Silver | Bronze |
|---|---|---|---|
Men's event
| Road Race | Theo de Rooij; Netherlands | | |

=== Track cycling ===
| Event | Gold | Silver | Bronze |
|---|---|---|---|
Men's event
| Individual pursuit | Jean-Jacques Rebière; France | | |
