= 1986 World University Cycling Championship =

- Venue: Moscow, Russia
- Date: 1986

The 1986 World University Cycling Championship was the 2nd Word University Cycling Championship sponsored by the International University Sports Federation (FISU), and sanctioned by the Union Cycliste Internationale (UCI). The championship was hosted by the Russian capital city of Moscow. Cycling athletes from universities all over the world competed in their disciplines to become World University Cycling Champion.
