= Anton Muzychkin =

Belarusian bicycle racer

Personal information
- Full name: Anton Muzychkin
- Born: 16 December 1994 (age 31) Gomel, Belarus
- Height: 1.8 m (5 ft 11 in)
- Weight: 76 kg (168 lb)

Cycling career
- Sport: Cycling
- Current team: CCN Factory Racing
- Disciplines: Track; Road
- Role: Rider
- Rider type: Endurance (track)

Professional teams
- 2015–2018: Minsk
- 2019–: Ferei Pro Cycling

Anton Muzychkin (born 16 December 1994) is a Belarusian cyclist, who currently rides for UCI Continental team CCN Factory Racing. He competed in the scratch event at the 2013 and 2014 UCI Track Cycling World Championships.

== Major results ==
2012
1st Scratch, UCI Junior World Track Championships
2nd Points race, National Track Championships
2013
1st Scratch, European Under-23 Track Championships
4th Time trial, National Road Championships
2014
1st Scratch, National Track Championships
2015
3rd Time trial, National Under-23 Road Championships
2017
National Track Championships

1st Team pursuit
1st Madison (with Raman Ramanau)
2nd Omnium
3rd Points race

2nd Time trial, National Road Championships
4th Belgrade–Banja Luka I
7th Tour de Ribas
