= Theo de Rooij =

Dutch cyclist

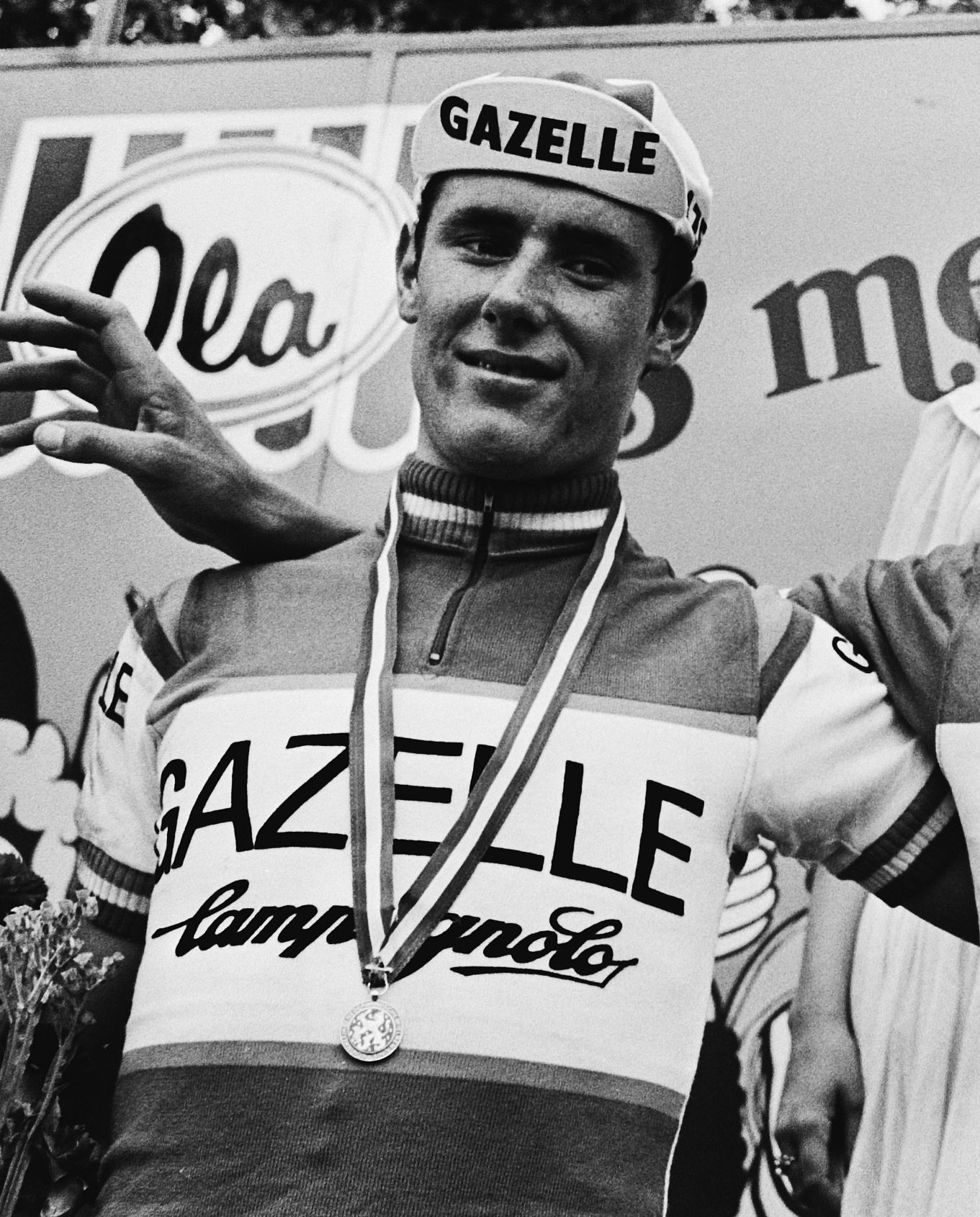

Personal information
- Full name: Theo de Rooij
- Born: 25 April 1957 (age 69) Harmelen, the Netherlands

Cycling career
- Sport: Cycling
- Role: Rider

Professional teams
- 1980: IJsboerke
- 1981–1982: Capri Sonne
- 1983: TI–Raleigh
- 1984–1990: Panasonic

Managerial teams
- 1991-1994: Panasonic
- 1996–2007: Rabobank
Medal record
Representing the Netherlands
Men's road bicycle racing
World University Cycling Championship
Gold medal – first place	1978 Antwerp	Road race

Theo de Rooij (born 25 April 1957 in Harmelen) is a retired Dutch former bicycle racer and former manager of the Rabobank cycling team - a position from which he resigned after the 2007 Tour de France. De Rooij was a professional rider from 1980 to 1990. He started his career in Belgian teams and the last eight years of his careers he served teams managed by Peter Post. He currently lives in Holten.

== Biography ==
De Rooij won several stages in the Tour de Suisse, the Tour of Germany and the Ronde van Nederland. He took part in nine editions of the Tour de France. He was known for his strategic intelligence.

After his professional career he became a team manager, joining Peter Post's Panasonic team. Later he would become manager of Jan Raas at Rabobank. In those days this was a remarkable switch due to the rivalry between Post and Raas. In 2003 he became the team director of the Rabobank team and Erik Breukink took over his position as a manager of the team. De Rooij partially switched his focus to recruiting.

In the 2007 Tour de France De Rooij made the decision to withdraw Michael Rasmussen from the Tour, while he was leading the general classifications. Rasmussen had won two stages and was only a few flat stages away from Paris, but had been chased by the press and anti doping agencies since his first win on stage 8. The reason for the withdrawal of Rasmussen by De Rooij was because Rasmussen lied about his location during training prior to the Tour de France. Former rider and journalist Davide Cassani recognized him in Italy, while Rasmussen told the UCI and Rabobank he was in Mexico. When confronted with this accusation, according to initial press reports, Rasmussen admitted the facts to his team leader, which resulted in Rasmussen's removal from the team and the Tour. Rasmussen himself denied that he had admitted any such thing, at the same time stating that Rabobank manager Theo de Rooij was a desperate man on the verge of a nervous breakdown. Only one day later, on 27 July, de Rooij informed Dutch newspaper De Volkskrant, that he would resign from his job when the 2007 Tour de France ended.

Theo de Rooij's farewell to the Rabobank Cycling teams came with a roll of honor. It took De Rooij twelve years to 'produce': 6 World Championships, 81 national championships, 10 victories World Cup Classics and 27 stage victories in the three Grand Tours - Tour de France, Giro d'Italia and Vuelta a Espana. In total, Theo de Rooij was involved in no less than 1738 victories of the Rabobank Cycling teams.

In 2008 he joined the board of the Tour of Overijssel. Since 2009, he also acted as race director. In addition, De Rooij formed along with Erben Wennemars and Jos de Koning the 'Langebaan' team (long track speed skating), in preparation for the 2014 Winter Olympics.

On 30 March 2009 De Rooij presented his biography 'beZield'. He handed over the first copy to Peter Post. Since 2010, an amateur classic has been named after him: Theo de Rooij Classic. The classic goes right through the heart of Overijssel. The Theo de Rooij Classic is also a fund raiser for a hospice in his hometown Rijssen-Holten.

Theo de Rooij is president of the Club '48, an association of approximately 100 successful former racers. Together, they present the annual 'Gerrit Schulte Trophy', for the best Dutch cyclists. The presentation of the annual awards, traditionally takes place at a prestigious gala evening. De Rooij took over the gavel at Club '48 from his teacher Peter Post.

Theo de Rooij's company 'Royal Sport Management' assists cyclists in their professional careers. One of the riders De Rooij manages is Robert Gesink.

Together with his business partner Joop Schuiling, Theo de Rooij incorporated his wide experience as a rider, team leader and manager in the production of special revolutionary electric bicycles: TdR Bikes. Under the brand name TdR, the Flox and the FloxX are manufactured in Asia. The bikes are assembled in the Netherlands.

Already at the launch, the TdR Bikes concept was a worldwide hit. For the technological innovations, TdR Bikes was both in 2011 and 2012 decorated at major international cycling trade shows. During Eurobike 2011 in Germany, TdR Bikes received a prestigious Gold Award for innovation, while at Taipei Cycle, there was the honour of a D&I Award for both development and innovation.
