= Batavierenrace =

Dutch annual student relay race

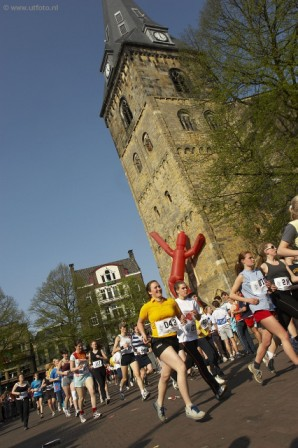
- Final restart in the center of Enschede
- Frequency: Every year
- Inaugurated: 1973
- Most recent: May 9, 2025; 17 months ago
- Website: https://www.batavierenrace.nl/english

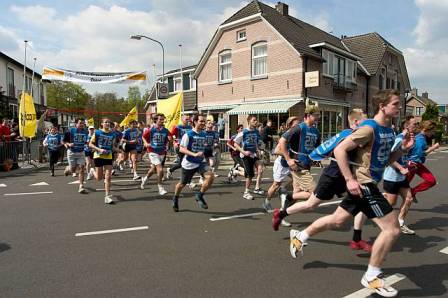
Second restart in Barchem

The Batavierenrace is a student relay race organized in the Netherlands each year in May. It is a 185 km running race starting off at the Radboud University Nijmegen in Nijmegen and it takes the up to 8500 participants in 25 stages (16 men's stages and 9 women's stages) through Germany to the campus of the University of Twente in Enschede. It was listed in 2012, in the Guinness World Records as the relay race with the highest number of participants (8,509). On May 24 and 25, 2024 the 52nd Batavierenrace took place.

Although mainly a Benelux event, teams from all over the world participate. The start is at 22:30 on a Friday at the and ends late in the afternoon of Saturday. All participants wear a vest, which functions as the baton and also hosts a transponder that registers the stage times. The stages range from 3 to 10 km in length, over paved and unpaved terrain. Due to the large number of participants, the start is divided into six groups and there are four restarts along the way, at the Radboud Sports Centre, in Ulft, Barchem and in the city centre of Enschede. In 2017, the first stage was moved to the city center of Nijmegen due to the event's lustrum. This was so successful that it was incorporated into the next editions. As much as it is sports event, it is a social happening, with the athletes and teams ranging from highly trained to those participating "just for the fun of it". Saturday night is host to one of the largest student parties in Europe with over 10,000 visitors. The event is supported by 700 volunteers, of which around 150 motorcycle-bound traffic controllers and many students.

== History ==
In 1972 a group of students of Nijmegen returned from the SOLA-relay in Sweden. They were so enthusiastic about this event, that they decided to organise a similar event in the Netherlands. They chose to follow the route the Batavians had followed some 50 years BC, descending down the river Rhine: from Nijmegen to Rotterdam. In 1973 around 600 students participated in the first edition. This is the namesake for the event, but the track was moved in 1974, because organizing an event on the original course proved to pose too many infrastructural and organizational problems. Since 1974 the athletes run from Nijmegen through Germany to the campus of the University of Twente and this course has remained largely unchanged throughout the years. The prize for the winning team is a wooden Swedish horse and refers back to the SOLA-relay.

The race was cancelled in 2001 due to an outbreak of foot-and-mouth disease in the rural area in which the race is organized. In 2020 and 2021, an online alternative race was organized due to the COVID-19 pandemic.

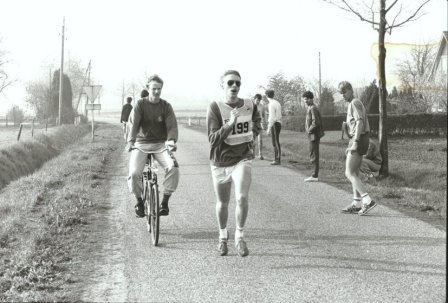
Participants of the 1976 edition

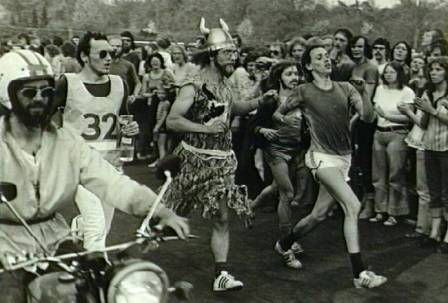
1976 participants arrive at the crowded track in Enschede

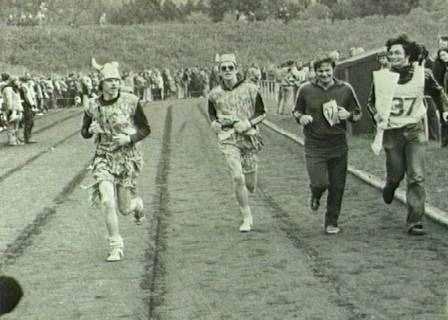
1976 participants approaching the finish line
