= African Wildlife Safaris Cycling Team =

Australian cycling team

Team information
- UCI code: AWS
- Registered: Australia
- Founded: 2014
- Disbanded: 2015
- Discipline: Road
- Status: UCI Continental
- Bicycles: Cannondale
- Website: Team home page

Key personnel
- Team manager: Steve Waite

Team name history
- 2014–2015: African Wildlife Safaris Cycling Team

African Wildlife Safaris Cycling Team was an Australian UCI Continental cycling team established in 2014 and disbanded in 2015.

== Team roster ==
As of 9 April 2015.

Rider	Date of birth
Jeremy Cameron (AUS)	21 March 1993 (age 33)
Massimo Graziato (ITA)	25 September 1988 (age 37)
Sean Lake (AUS)	6 December 1991 (age 34)
Patrick Lane (AUS)	29 August 1991 (age 35)
Shaun O'Callaghan (AUS)	5 July 1993 (age 33)
James Cummings (AUS)	30 August 1993 (age 33)

Rider	Date of birth
Rico Rogers (NZL)	25 April 1978 (age 48)
Michael Schweizer (GER)	16 December 1983 (age 42)
Alexander Smyth (AUS)	10 December 1988 (age 37)
Oscar Stevenson (AUS)	23 June 1995 (age 31)
Darcy Woolley (AUS)	18 August 1993 (age 33)

== Major wins ==
2015
Stage 2 Tour of Al Zubarah, Michael Schweizer
