= Aleh Ahiyevich =

Belarusian cyclist

Personal information
- Full name: Aleh Ahiyevich
- Born: 28 June 1993 (age 33) Minsk, Belarus

Cycling career
- Sport: Cycling
- Current team: Retired
- Disciplines: Road; Track
- Role: Rider

Amateur team
- 2018: RCOP–Belarus

Professional team
- 2016–2017: Minsk Cycling Club

Aleh Ahiyevich (born 28 June 1993) is a Belarusian former professional racing cyclist. He rode at the 2015 UCI Track Cycling World Championships.

== Major results ==
2015
National Road Championships

1st Under-23 time trial
3rd Time trial

6th Minsk Cup
2016
3rd Time trial, National Road Championships
