= Maaris Meier =

Estonian cyclist

Personal information
- Born: 22 February 1983 (age 43) Tallinn, then part of Estonian SSR, Soviet Union

Cycling career
- Sport: Cycling
- Disciplines: Road cycling, Mountain biking
Medal record
Women's road cycling
Representing Estonia
World University Cycling Championship
Silver medal – second place	2008 Nijmegen	Cross-country

Maaris Meier (born 22 May 1983) is a Mountain bike rider and road cyclist from Estonia. She represented her nation at the 2004 Summer Olympics in the women's road race. She won the silver medal at the 2008 World University Cycling Championship in the Cross-country.
