= 2016 World University Cycling Championship =

- Venue: Tagaytay, Philippines
- Date: March 17–20, 2016
- Nations participating: 16
- Cyclists participating: 120
- Events: 8

The 2016 World University Cycling Championship was the 7th edition of the World University Cycling Championship. The tournament was hosted by the Federation of School Sports Association of the Philippines (FESSAP), sponsored by the International University Sports Federation (FISU) and sanctioned by the Union Cycliste Internationale (UCI). The championship proper took place in Tagaytay, Philippines from March 17–20, 2016 with the opening ceremonies held on March 16. It is the first FISU World University Cycling Championship to be held outside of Europe and the first in Asia.

== Race details ==
Four races was conducted in the Tagaytay–Batangas City route: Road Race spanning 122-km, Criterium spanning 80-km, Cross-country cycling spanning 35-km and, Cross Country Eliminator spanning 1.2 km.

== Participants ==
120 cyclists from 16 nations entered the tournament.

- Australia
- China
- Chinese Taipei
- Costa Rica
- Estonia
- Germany
- Japan
- Malaysia
- Mongolia
- Netherlands
- Philippines
- Poland
- Portugal
- South Africa
- South Korea
- Slovakia

== Schedule ==
Thursday, March 17, 2016

- Criterium: women's race, 36 km (1.8 km track, 20 laps)
- Criterium: men's race, 54 km (1.8 km track, 30 laps)

Friday, March 18, 2016

- Road cycling: women's road race
- Road cycling: men's road race

Saturday, March 19, 2016

- Cross Country Eliminator: women's race
- Cross Country Eliminator: men's race

Sunday March 20, 2016

- Cross Country Olympic: women's race
- Cross Country Olympic: men's race

== Events summary ==
=== Road cycling ===
Event	Gold		Silver		Bronze	
Men's events
Criterium details	Ryan Cayubit; Philippines	19 pts	Alexander Weifenbach; Germany	18 pts	Cyrus Monk; Australia	11 pts
Road race details	Cyrus Monk; Australia	3:13:17	Maral-Erdene Batmunkh; Mongolia	3:13:42	Alexander Weifenbach; Germany	3:13:52
Women's events
Criterium details	Romy Kasper; Germany	23 pts	Nikol Płosaj; Poland	16 pts	Monika Brzeźna; Poland	11 pts
Road race details	Romy Kasper; Germany	2:42:48	Nikol Płosaj; Poland	2:47:00	Marella Salamat; Philippines	2:47:01

=== Mountain biking ===
Event	Gold		Silver		Bronze	
Men's events
Cross country eliminator details	Marcin Kawalec; Poland		Louis Wolf; Germany		Kohei Maeda; Japan	
Cross country details	Piotr Kurczab; Poland	1:31:20.60	Marcin Kawalec; Poland	1:31:20.61	Louis Wolf; Germany	1:32:48.64
Women's events
Cross country eliminator details	Sofia Wiedenroth; Germany		Marta Turobos; Poland		Seika Ainota; Japan	
Cross country details	Sofia Wiedenroth; Germany	1:16:43.14	Aleksandra Podgorska; Poland	1:19:12.21	Marta Turobos; Poland	1:26:02.46

== Medal table ==
Rank	Nation	Gold	Silver	Bronze	Total
1	Germany (GER)	4	2	2	8
2	Poland (POL)	2	5	2	9
3	Australia (AUS)	1	0	1	2
3	Philippines (PHI)	1	0	1	2
5	Mongolia (MGL)	0	1	0	1
6	Japan (JPN)	0	0	2	2
Totals (6 entries)		8	8	8	24
