= Ferei–CCN =

Belarusian cycling team

Team information
- UCI code: FCT
- Registered: Ukraine (2019); Belarus (2020–)
- Founded: 2019
- Discipline: Road
- Status: UCI Continental

Team name history
- 2019; 2020–: Ferei Pro Cycling; Ferei–CCN

Ferei–CCN is a Belarusian UCI Continental cycling team founded in 2019. In 2019, the team competed under a Ukrainian registration.

After the 2022 Russian invasion of Ukraine, the UCI said that Belarusian teams are forbidden from competing in international events.

== Team roster ==
As of 7 March 2021.

Rider	Date of birth
Hannes Bergström Frisk (SWE)	7 June 1995 (age 31)
Mikhail Besaha (BLR)	3 November 1989 (age 36)
Dainis Bricis (BLR)	19 October 1998 (age 27)
Peter Cevini (ITA)	4 August 1991 (age 35)
Roy Eefting (NED)	4 September 1989 (age 37)
Sindre Haugsvær (NOR)	5 March 1994 (age 32)

Rider	Date of birth
Kanstantsin Klimiankou (BLR)	3 August 1989 (age 37)
Vincent Louiche (FRA)	18 July 1992 (age 34)
Anton Muzychkin (BLR)	16 December 1994 (age 31)
Vladyslav Pohorelov (UKR)	5 November 1995 (age 30)
Aliaksandr Saroka (BLR)	26 March 1998 (age 28)
