= Marella Salamat =

Filipino cyclist

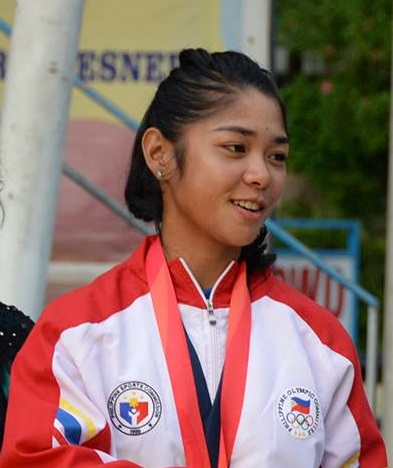

Personal information
- Full name: Marella Vania Salamat
- Born: 24 April 1994 (age 32) Muntinlupa, Philippines

Cycling career
- Sport: Cycling
Medal record
Women's road cycling
Representing Philippines
World University Cycling Championship
| Bronze medal – third place | 2016 Tagaytay | Road race |
Southeast Asian Games
| Gold medal – first place | 2015 Singapore | Individual time trial |

Marella Vania Salamat (born 24 April 1994) is a Filipina road cycling racer and former bowler.

== Education ==
Salamat attended the University of the East where she pursued a course on dentistry. She decided to halt her studies on her second year to give more focus on her cycling career. She later resumed her bid to obtain a degree and began taking an online marketing course by the Southville International Colleges.

== Career ==
Salamat is a former bowling athlete who shifted to competitive cycling in 2013. She was scouted by national cycling coach Cesar Lobramonte in 2013 when she was biking with Edward Coo and Orlyn Batistin, her bowling coaches, at the Mall of Asia grounds as part of her cross training. Lobramonte encouraged her to shift to the sport.

She then won a gold medal at the 2015 Southeast Asian Games at the women's individual time trial event.

At the 2016 World University Cycling Championship, Salamat won a bronze medal at the women's road race event.

Salamat placed eighth at the nine-legged 2017 Biwase Cup Tour of Vietnam while in the team classification event she led the Philippines to a seventh-place finish.

== Major results ==
2015
Southeast Asian Games

1st Time trial
8th Road race

2016
3rd Road race, World University Cycling Championship
8th Overall Tour of Thailand
9th Time trial, Asian Road Championships
2017
5th Road race, Southeast Asian Games
6th Overall Tour of Thailand
8th Time trial, Asian Road Championships
2019
Southeast Asian Games

7th Time trial
7th Road race

2022
6th Time trial, Southeast Asian Games
