= Patrick Lane =

Patrick Lane may refer to:

- Patrick Lane (poet) (1939–2019), Canadian poet
- Patrick Lane (cyclist), (born 1991), Australian cyclist
- Patrick Lane (politician) (born 1975), American politician

== See also ==
- Paddy Lane (footballer) (born 2001), football player for Fleetwood Town FC
- Paddy Lane (politician) (1934–2012), Irish Fianna Fáil politician
- Patrik Laine
