= 1990 World University Cycling Championship =

- Venue: Palma de Mallorca, Spain
- Date: 1990

The 1990 World University Cycling Championship is the 3rd Word University Cycling Championship sponsored by the International University Sports Federation (FISU) and sanctioned by the Union Cycliste Internationale (UCI). The championship was hosted by the Spanish city, Palma de Mallorca on the island of Majorca. Cycling athletes from universities all over the world competed in their disciplines to become World University Cycling Champion.
