= 2006 World University Cycling Championship =

- Venue: Antwerp and Herentals, Belgium
- Date: March 22–26, 2006
- Nations participating: 17
- Events: 5

The 2006 World University Cycling Championship is the 4th Word University Cycling Championship sponsored by the International University Sports Federation (FISU) and sanctioned by the Union Cycliste Internationale (UCI). Cycling made his comeback after a 16-year absence as a university sport. The championship took place in Antwerp (for the road race events) and Herentals (for the cyclo-cross event), Belgium from March 22 to March 26, 2006. The city of Herentals is located in the geographic region of Campine, which is well known for cyclo-cross. The championship included 119 athletes (86 men, 33 women) and 54 officials from 17 countries. Athletes contested in a cyclo-cross race for men and four road cycling disciplines: a road race and an individual time trial for both men and women.

== Participation ==
Each country was allowed to enter a maximum of twelve competitors: 4 men and women in the road race events and 4 men in the Cyclo-cross race. A person was allowed to participate as a competitor if he/she was born between January 1, 1978, and December 31, 1988, and was a full-time student at a university or similar institute or had obtained their academic degree in the year preceding the event.

== Road cycling ==
The road race events were held in Antwerp, Belgium.

=== Time Trial ===
The men’s and women’s time trials were held at March 23, consisted of 4 laps of 6.8 km for men (27.2) and 2 laps (13.6 km) for women. The men’ s race included 27 cyclists and the women’ s race 23. Both men’s and women’s time trials were dominated by Dutch cyclists with Loes Gunnewijk winning women’s gold and Malaya van Ruitenbeek taking home the men’s gold medal. Women’s silver was won by Ellen van Dijk and bronze went to Germans Verena Jooss. Tobias Erler won the silver medal in the men’s event and the host country was represented with Michiel van Aelbroeck winning bronze.

=== Road race ===
The road race events took place at 25 May on the same left hand circuit as that of the time trial and consisted of 21 laps (142.8 km) for men and 13 laps (88.4 km) for women. The men’s race started at 2pm and included 71 cyclists. The women’s road race competed in a field of 33 athletes.

After winning silver in the time trial, the Dutch Ellen van Dijk won gold in the women's road race leaving the silver to Eva Lutz from Germany and the bronze to Ludivine Henrion from. In the men’s road race the gold medal went to Yvo Kusters from the Netherlands leaving the silver for Belgian time trial bronze medallist Michiel van Aelbroeck and bronze to the Dutch Malaya van Ruitenbeek Time Trial gold medallist.

== Cyclo cross ==
The men’s cyclo cross race was held in Herentals, Belgium at 26 May. Sebastian Hannover from Germany won the gold and the silver went to Axel Bult from the Netherlands. It was a tight race between Hannover and Bult with a little sprint at the end. Belgian Tom van den Bosch was in fourth position for most of the race, but with three laps to go he took advantage of a gap left by René Birkenfelt and raced past the German and never gave up that spot for the rest of the race.

== Schedule ==
Wednesday 22 March 2006

- Opening ceremony

Thursday 23 March 2006

- Road cycling: women's time trial, 13.6 km
- Road cycling: men's time trial, 27.2 km

Friday 24 March 2006

- Cyclo-cross: Men's race

Saturday 25 March 2006

- Road cycling women's road race, 88.4 km
- 14:00 - Road cycling: men's road race, 142.8 km

== Events summary ==
=== Road cycling ===
Event	Gold		Silver		Bronze	
Men's events
Road Race details	Yvo Kusters; Netherlands	3h 08' 00"	Michiel Van Aelbroeck; Belgium	s.t.	Malaya van Ruitenbeek; Netherlands	s.t.
Time trial details	Malaya van Ruitenbeek; Netherlands	32' 39.55"	Tobias Erler; Germany	+ 1.13"	Michiel Van Aelbroeck; Belgium	+ 41.79"
Women's events
Road Race	Ellen van Dijk; Netherlands	2h 21' 00"	Eva Lutz; Germany	s.t.	Ludivine Henrion; Belgium	s.t.
Time trial	Loes Gunnewijk; Netherlands	18' 11.66"	Ellen van Dijk; Netherlands	+ 28.50"	Verena Joos; Germany	+ 43.62"

=== Cyclo-cross ===
Event	Gold		Silver		Bronze	
Men's event
Cyclo-cross race details	Sebastian Hannöver; Germany	48' 46"	Axel Bult; Netherlands	+ 1"	Tom van den Bosch; Belgium	+ 13"

== Medal table ==
Rank	Nation	Gold	Silver	Bronze	Total
1	Netherlands (NED)	4	2	1	7
2	Germany (GER)	1	2	1	4
3	Belgium (BEL)	0	1	3	4
Totals (3 entries)		5	5	5	15

== See also ==
- 2006 World University Championships
