= Barchem =

- Village
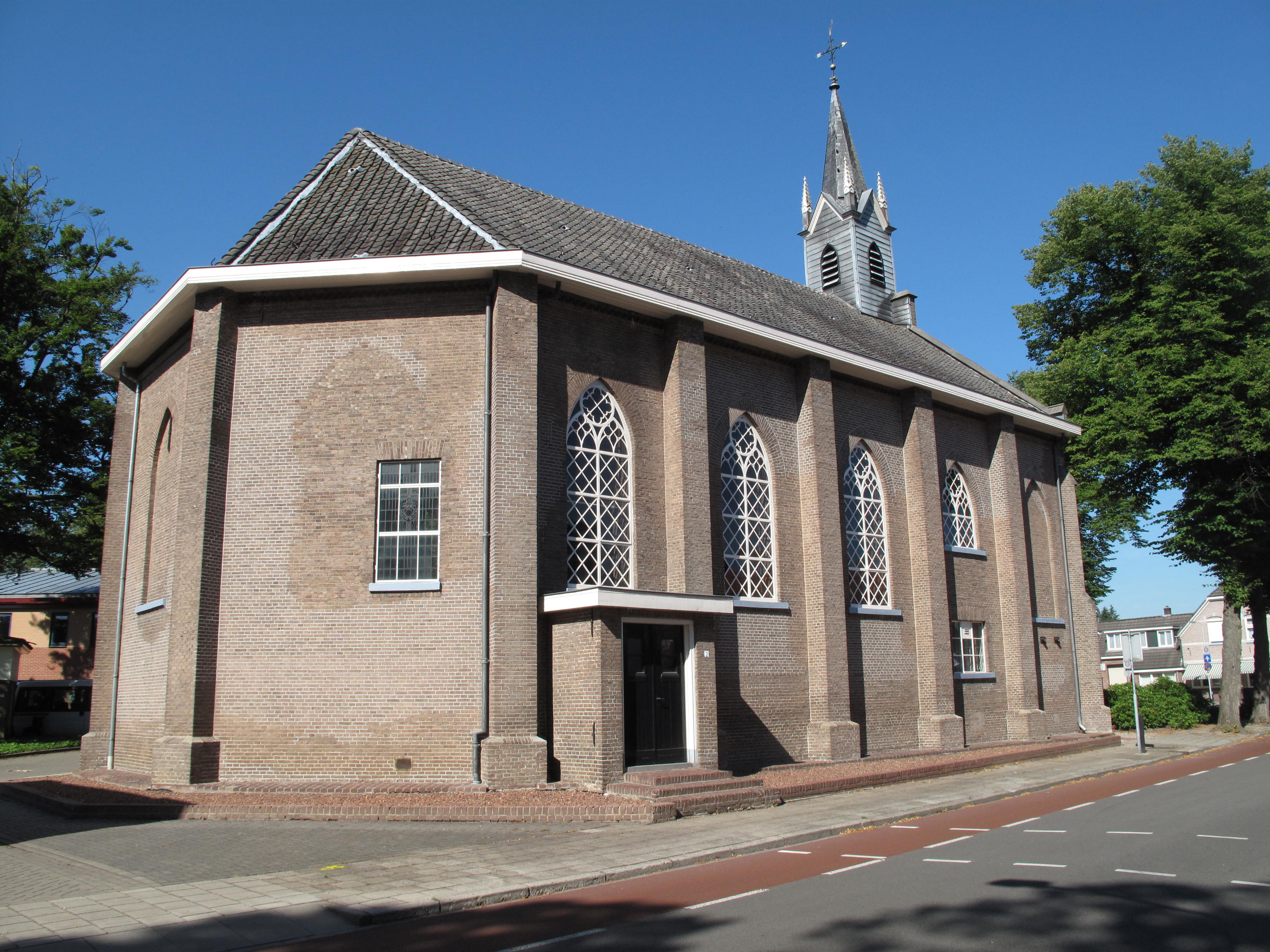
- Church of Barchem

- Location in the Netherlands Barchem (Netherlands)
- Coordinates: 52°7′27″N 6°26′35″E
- Country: Netherlands
- Province: Gelderland
- Municipality: Lochem

Area
  - Total: 25.66 km^{2} (9.91 sq mi)
- Elevation: 16 m (52 ft)

Population (2021)
  - Total: 1,750
  - Density: 68.2/km^{2} (177/sq mi)
- Time zone: UTC+1 (CET)
  - Summer (DST): UTC+2 (CEST)
- Postal code: 7244
- Dialing code: 0573

Barchem is a village in the Dutch province of Gelderland, located in the municipality Lochem, about 15 km east of the city of Zutphen.

It was first mentioned in 1474 as Borchem, and means "settlement on/near a hill". It used to be a little agricultural settlement, and used to be centred around the Barchemse Enk. In 1840, it was home to 346 people. Later, the centre moved to the road from Lochem to Ruurlo where a toll house was constructed in 1857. In 1860, the church was built at the intersection with the road from Borculo to Zwiep. During World War II, Barchem was the scene of heavy fighting. There are 25 commonwealth graves on the general cemetery.

== Gallery ==
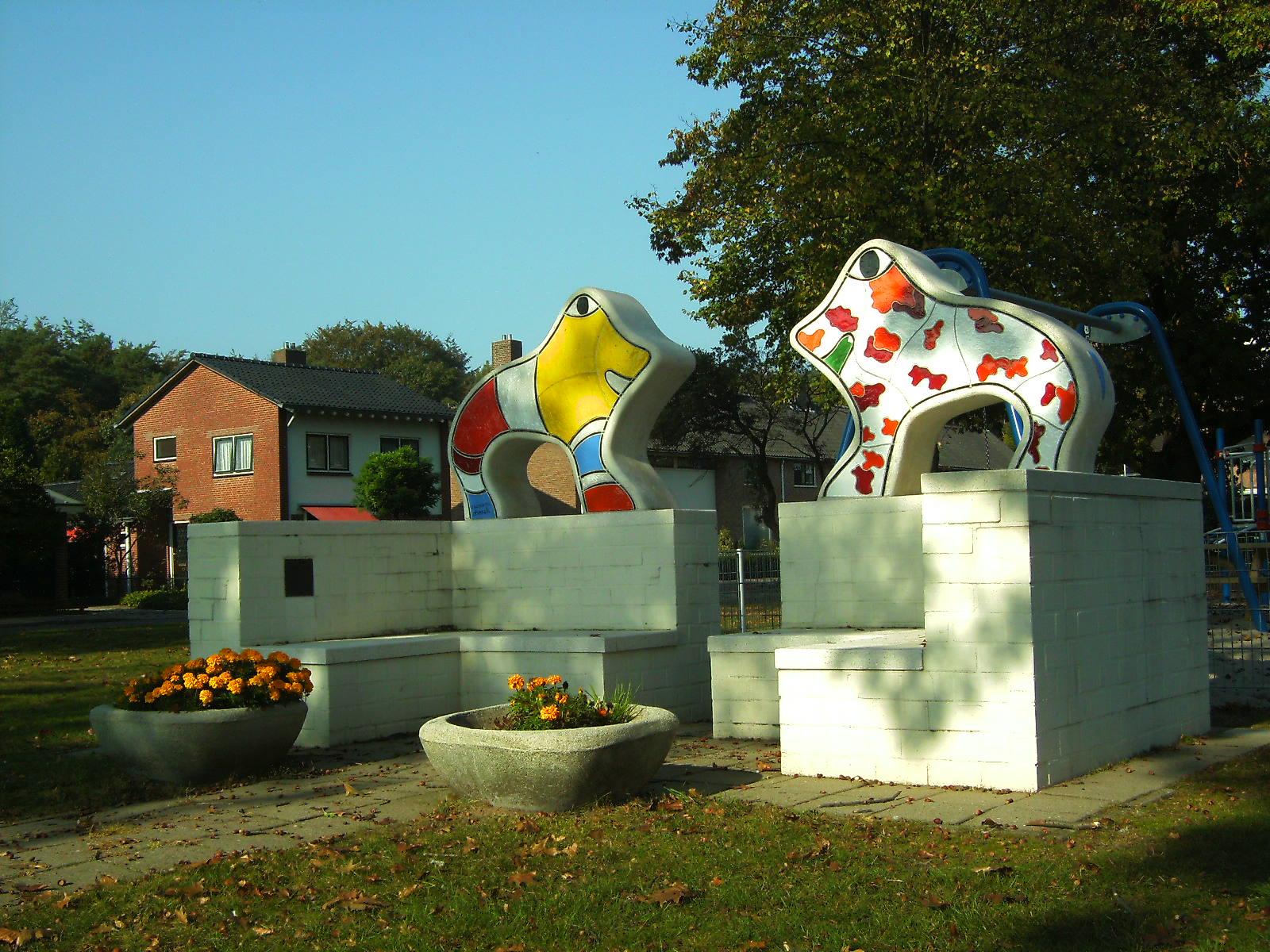
Art in Barchem

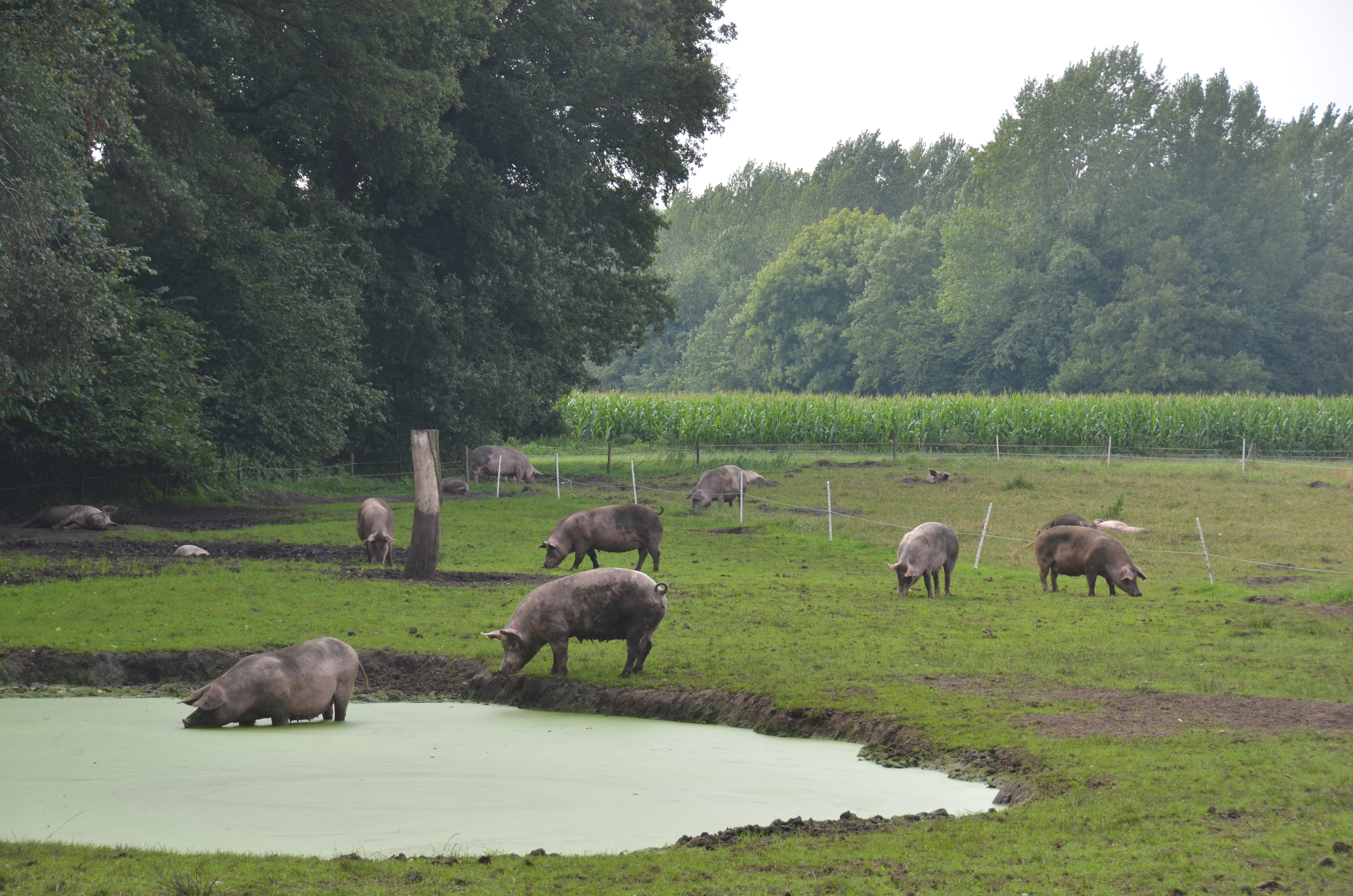
Free roaming pigs in Barchem

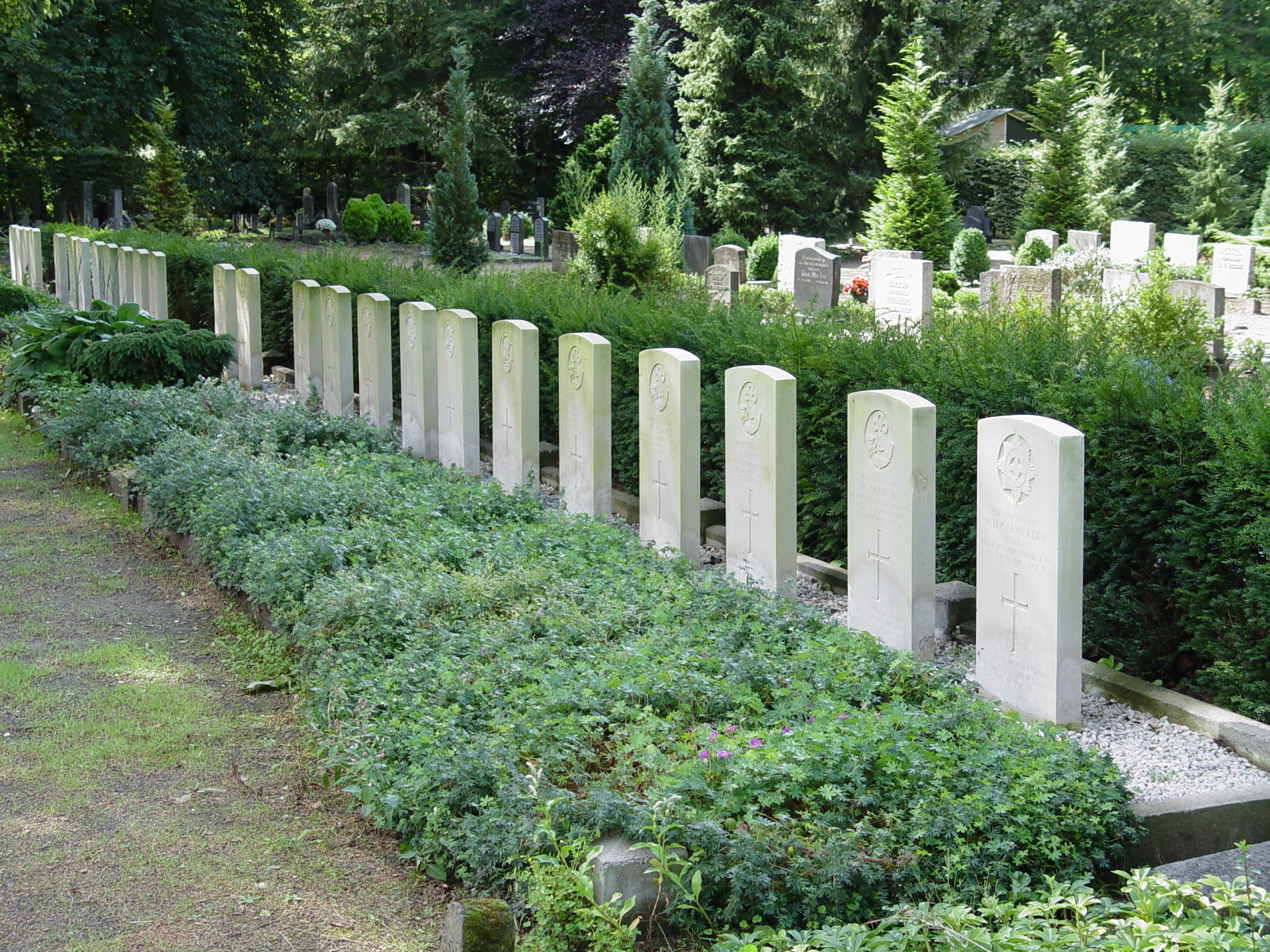
Commonwealth graves in Barchem
