= Monika Brzeźna =

Polish cyclist (born 1991)

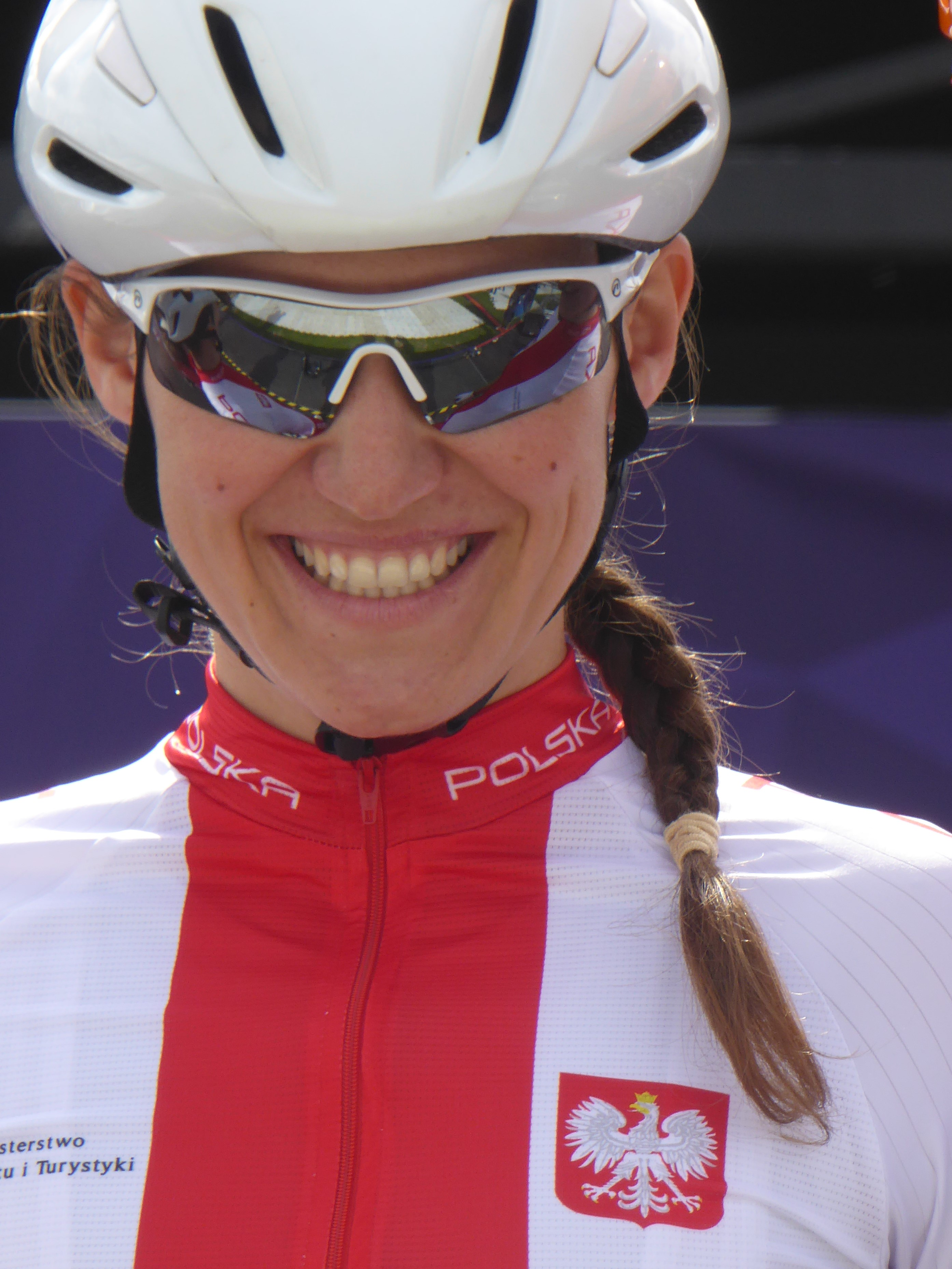
- Brzeźna at the 2018 European Road Cycling Championships.

Personal information
- Full name: Monika Brzeźna
- Born: 12 October 1991 (age 35) Wrocław, Poland

Cycling career
- Sport: Cycling
- Current team: Mat Atom Deweloper
- Discipline: Road
- Role: Rider

Amateur team
- 2017–: Mat Atom Deweloper
Medal record
Women's road cycling
Representing Poland
World University Cycling Championship
Bronze medal – third place	2016 Tagaytay	Women's criterium

Monika Brzeźna (born 12 October 1991) is a Polish professional racing cyclist. She rode in the women's road race at the 2015 UCI Road World Championships.
