= World University Cycling Championship =

Cycling competition

Race details
- Discipline: Road cycling Track cycling Mountainbike; Cyclo-cross
- Organiser: FISU
- Web site: www.fisu.net/fr/FISU-Cycling-3568.html

History
- First edition: 1947 (non FISU editions); 1978 (FISU editions)
- Editions: 3 (non FISU editions); 10 (FISU editions)

The World University Cycling Championship is a competition sponsored by the International University Sports Federation (FISU) and sanctioned by the Union Cycliste Internationale (UCI), which was first held in 1978 in Antwerp, Belgium. Before 1978 there were also World University Championships, but these were not sponsored by the International University Sports Federation. The latest edition was held in San Carlos, Costa Rica during 2024. The championship last five days and could contain events in five cycling sports: road cycling (road race and time trial), track cycling, mountainbike (cross-country and marathon), BMX and Cyclo-Cross.

== Competitions ==
As part of the Student World Championships:

Year	Country	City	Road Cycling	Track Cycling
1947	France	Paris	Road race (M)	Individual pursuit (M); Team pursuit (M)
1949			Road race (M)	Team pursuit (M)
1950			Road race (M)	
1954	Hungary	Budapest	Road race (M)	Individual pursuit (M); Team pursuit (M)

FISU World University Cycling Championships:

Year	Country	City	Road Cycling	Track Cycling	Mountainbike	Cyclo-cross	Most gold medals
1978	Belgium	Antwerp	Road race (M)	Individual pursuit (M)	Not included	Not included	? (?)
1986	Russia	Moscow	Road race (M)		Not included	Not included	? (?)
1990	Spain	Palma	Road race (M)		Not included	Not included	? (?)
2006	Belgium	Antwerp/Herentals	Road race (M&W); Time trial (M&W)	Not included	Not included	Cyclo-cross race (M)	Netherlands (4)
2008	Netherlands	Nijmegen	Road race (M&W); Time trial (M&W)	Not included	Cross-country (M&W); Marathon (M&W)	Not included	Netherlands (4)
2014	Poland	Jelenia Gora	Road race (M&W); Time trial (M&W)	Not included	Mass start (M&W); Time trial (M&W)	Not included	Poland (4)
2016	Philippines	Tagaytay	Criterium (M&W); Road race (M&W)	Not included	Cross-country Eliminator; Cross-country (M&W)	Not included	Germany (4)
2018	Portugal	Braga	Road race (M&W); Time trial (M&W)	Not included	Cross-country (M&W); Downhill (M&W)	Not included	Germany (2)
2024	Costa Rica	San Carlos	Criterium (M&W); Road race (M&W); Time trial (M&W)	Not included	Cross-country Eliminator (M&W); Cross-country (M&W)	Not included	? (?)
2026	China	Zhangjiakou	Criterium (M&W); Road race (M&W); Time trial (M&W)	Not included	Cross-country Eliminator (M&W); Cross-country (M&W)	Not included	Germany (3); Poland; China

== See also ==
- Cycling at the Summer Universiade
