= Andrei Krasilnikau =

Belarusian cyclist

Personal information
- Full name: Andrei Henadzevich Krasilnikau
- Born: 25 April 1989 (age 37): Brest, Byelorussian SSR, Soviet Union; (now Belarus)

Cycling career
- Sport: Cycling
- Current team: Retired
- Discipline: Road
- Role: Rider

Amateur teams
- 2009: World Cycling Centre
- 2010: Felt–Holowesko Partners
- 2013–2014: AVC Aix-en-Provence

Professional teams
- 2011–2012: Chipotle–Garmin Development Team
- 2015: Minsk
- 2016–2018: Holowesko Citadel Racing Team

Andrei Henadzevich Krasilnikau (Belarusian: Андрэй Генадзевіч Красільнікаў; born 25 April 1989 in Brest) is a Belarusian former professional cyclist, who rode professionally between 2011 and 2012, and from 2015 to 2018. During his career he would make an appearance at the UCI Road World Championships, competing in the time trial in 2012.

== Major results ==
2007
5th Time trial, UEC European Junior Road Championships
2008
2nd Time trial, World University Cycling Championships
2nd Time trial, National Under-23 Road Championships
2009
1st Stage 4 (ITT) Coupe des nations Ville Saguenay
2nd Time trial, National Road Championships
8th Overall Grand Prix Guillaume Tell
9th Overall Tour de l'Avenir
2010
2nd Time trial, National Road Championships
9th Time trial, UCI Under-23 Road World Championships
2011
2nd Overall Giro do Interior de São Paulo
2012
2nd Time trial, National Road Championships
2013
National Road Championships

1st Road race
2nd Time trial

7th Overall Giro della Regione Friuli Venezia Giulia
10th Overall Tour des Pays de Savoie
2014
9th Overall Tour des Pays de Savoie
2015
National Road Championships

1st Road race
3rd Time trial

7th Grand Prix of ISD
10th Horizon Park Classic
