= Verena Jooß =

German cyclist (born 1979)

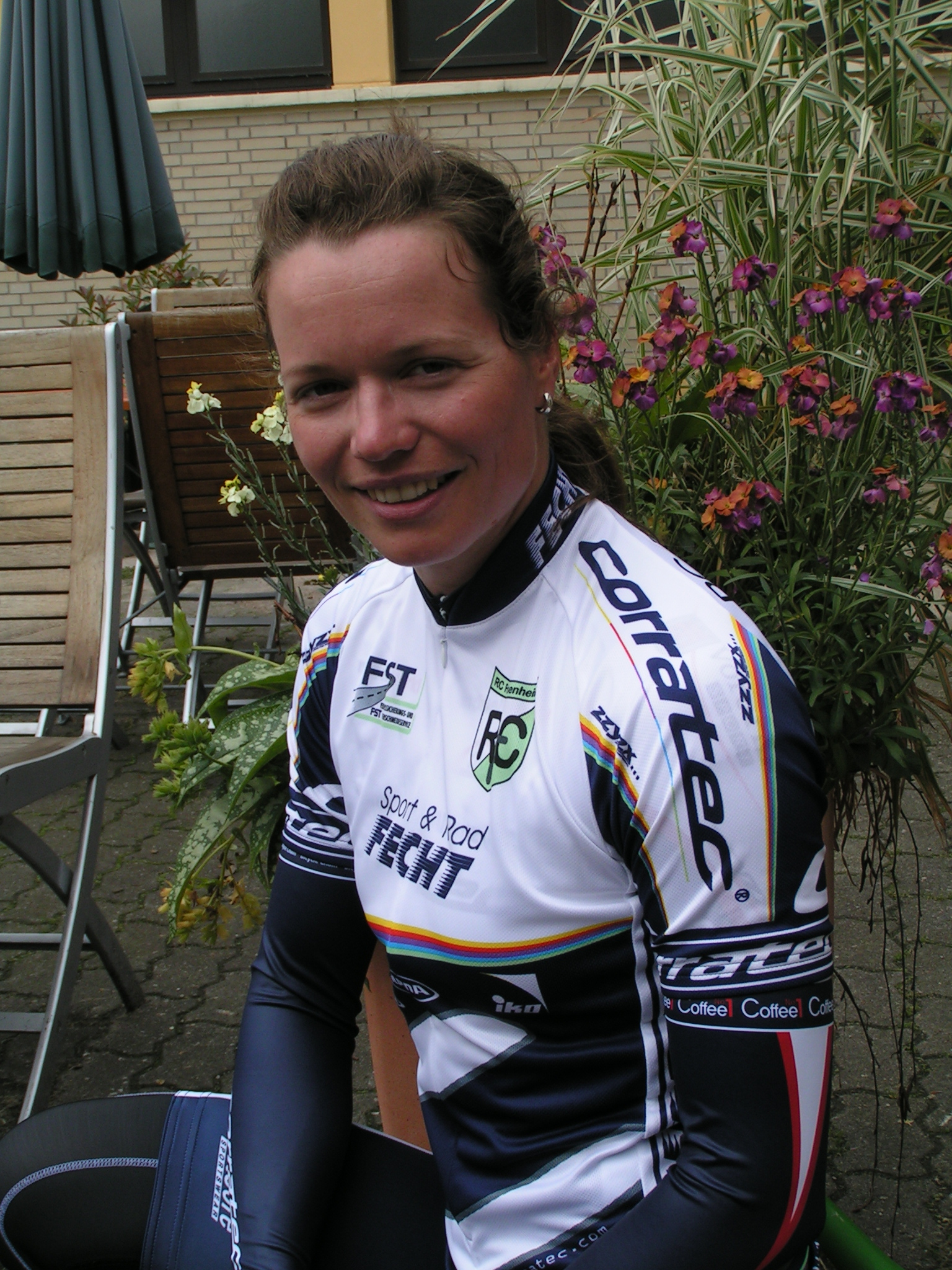
- Verena Jooß in 2010

Personal information
- Born: 9 January 1979 (age 47) Ettlingen or Karlsruhe, West Germany
- Height: 171 cm (5 ft 7 in)
- Weight: 63 kg (139 lb)

Cycling career
- Sport: Cycling

Verena Jooß (born 9 January 1979 in Ettlingen or Karlsruhe) is a German road and track cyclist.

She won the bronze medal at the 2006 World University Cycling Championship in the time trial behind Ellen van Dijk and Loes Gunnewijk. In 2008 she rode with the German team in the team pursuit to the bronze medal at the 2008 UCI Track Cycling World Championships and finished 10th in the individual pursuit. Jooß competed on the track at the 2008 Summer Olympics in the women's individual pursuit, where she finished 11th. She also rode the women's points race but did not finish.

== Achievements ==
2004
National Champion, individual pursuit

2005
National Champion, individual pursuit

2006
2006 World University Cycling Championship, time trial

2007
National Champion, individual pursuit

2008
1st World Cup in Copenhagen, Team Pursuit
3rd 2008 UCI Track Cycling World Championships, Team pursuit

2009
2nd 2009-2010 World Cup in Manchester, Team Pursuit

2010
European Track Championships, Team pursuit

2011
National Champion, team sprint
