= Nikol Płosaj =

Polish cyclist (born 1996)

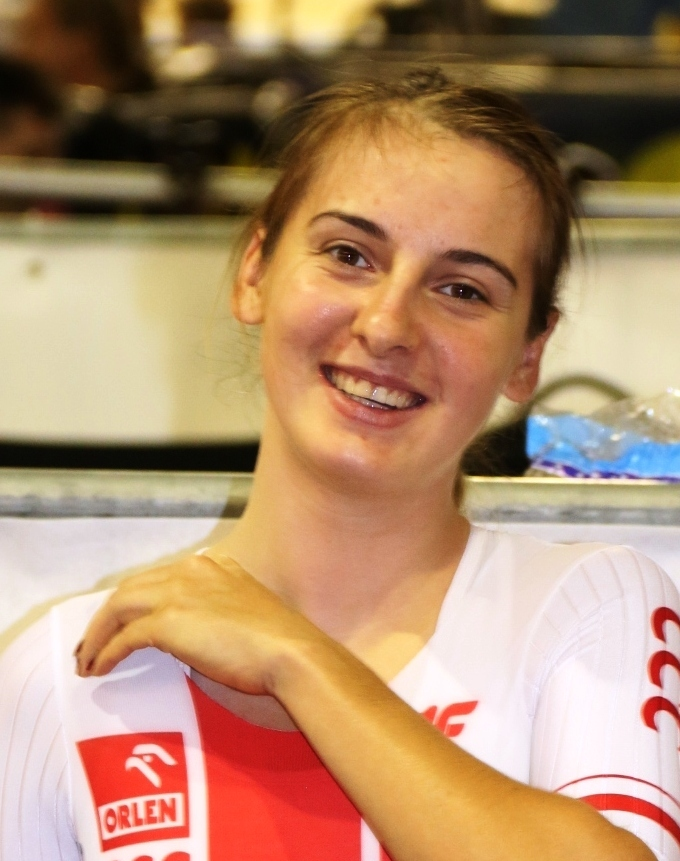
- Płosaj in 2017

Personal information
- Born: 22 May 1996 (age 30)

Cycling career
- Sport: Cycling
- Disciplines: Road and Track cycling
Medal record
Women's track cycling
Representing Poland
European Games
Bronze medal – third place	2019 Minsk	Team pursuit
UEC European Track Championships
Silver medal – second place	2016 Yvelines	Team pursuit
Bronze medal – third place	2017 Berlin	Team pursuit
Bronze medal – third place	2019 Apeldoorn	Elimination race
World University Cycling Championship
Silver medal – second place	2016 Tagaytay	Road race
Silver medal – second place	2016 Tagaytay	Criterium

Nikol Płosaj (born 22 May 1996) is a Polish road and track cyclist, representing Poland at international competitions.

As a junior, she competed at the 2013 UCI Road World Championships in the women's junior road race and at the 2014 UCI Road World Championships in the women's junior road race. At the 2016 World University Cycling Championship she won the silver medal in both the road race and criterium.

She won the silver medal at the 2016 UEC European Track Championships in the team pursuit.
