= Michael Schweizer =

German cyclist

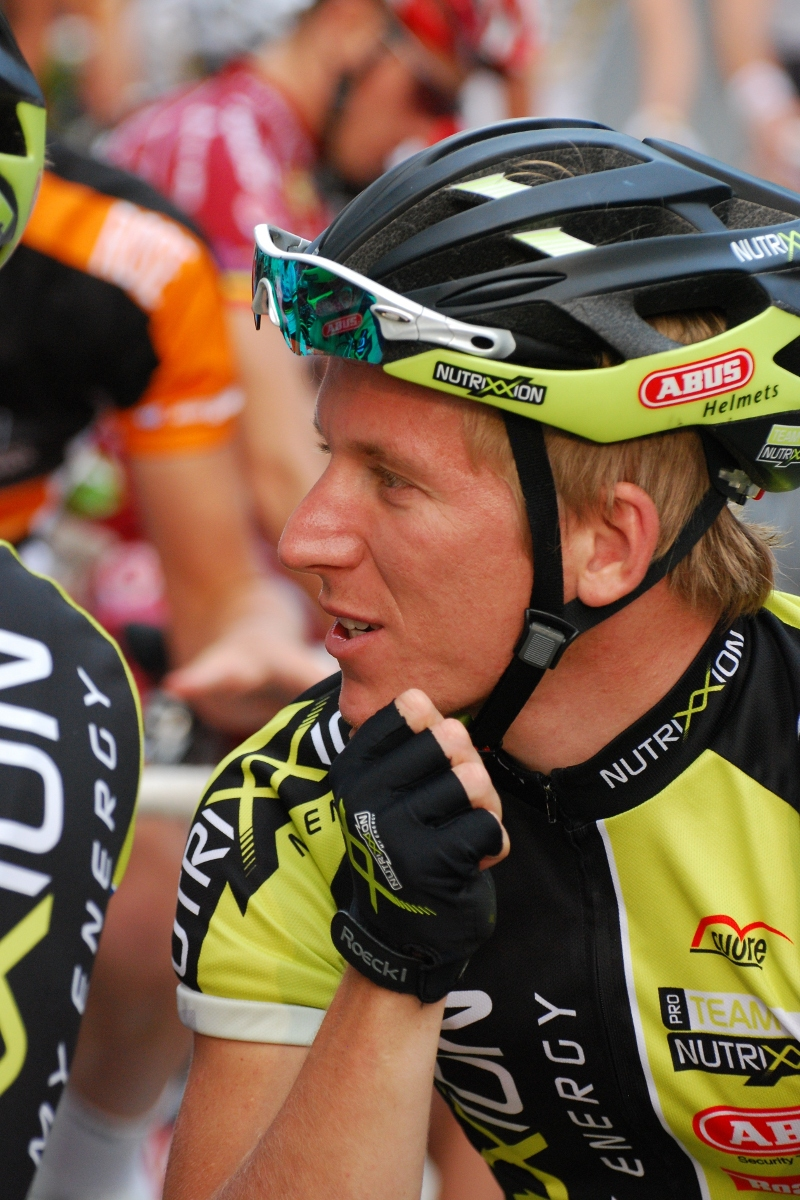
- Schweizer in 2010

Personal information
- Full name: Michael Schweizer
- Born: 16 December 1983 (age 42) Aachen, West Germany

Cycling career
- Sport: Cycling
- Current team: RC Zugvogel 09 Aachen
- Discipline: Road
- Role: Rider

Amateur teams
- 2003: Vermarc Sportswear
- 2006–2008: RC Zugvogel 09 Aachen
- 2006–2007: PZ Racing Test–Aachen
- 2008: Physiodom
- 2009: Racing Students
- 2009: SC Wiedenbrück 2000
- 2016: Stevens Racing
- 2016–: RC Zugvogel 09 Aachen

Professional teams
- 2004–2005: ComNet–Senges
- 2010–2012: Team Nutrixxion–Sparkasse
- 2013: Team NSP–Ghost
- 2014: Synergy Baku
- 2015: African Wildlife Safaris Cycling Team

Michael Schweizer (born 16 December 1983 in Aachen) is a German cyclist, who currently rides for German amateur team RC Zugvogel 09 Aachen. His brother Christoph Schweizer is also a cyclist.

== Major results ==
2008
2nd Road race, World University Road Championships
9th Rund um Düren
2009
1st Stage 2 Tour de Liège
3rd Rund um Düren
2010
2nd Rund um Düren
2nd Kernen Omloop Echt-Susteren
3rd Ronde van Midden-Nederland
9th Omloop van het Waasland
2011
3rd Ronde van Midden-Nederland
5th Grand Prix of Moscow
9th Mayor Cup
2012
1st Rund um Düren
1st Stage 2 Five Rings of Moscow
5th Kernen Omloop Echt-Susteren
6th Ronde van Midden-Nederland
7th Garmin ProRace
7th Ster van Zwolle
2013
1st Stage 2 Course de la Solidarité Olympique
3rd Ronde van Midden-Nederland
6th Trofeo Alcide Degasperi
2014
5th Overall Tour of Estonia
2015
1st Overall Tour de Toowoomba
1st Stage 3 Tour of the King Valley
1st Stage 5 Tour of Tasmania
1st Stage 2 Tour of Al Zubarah
