= Robin Chaigneau =

Dutch cyclist

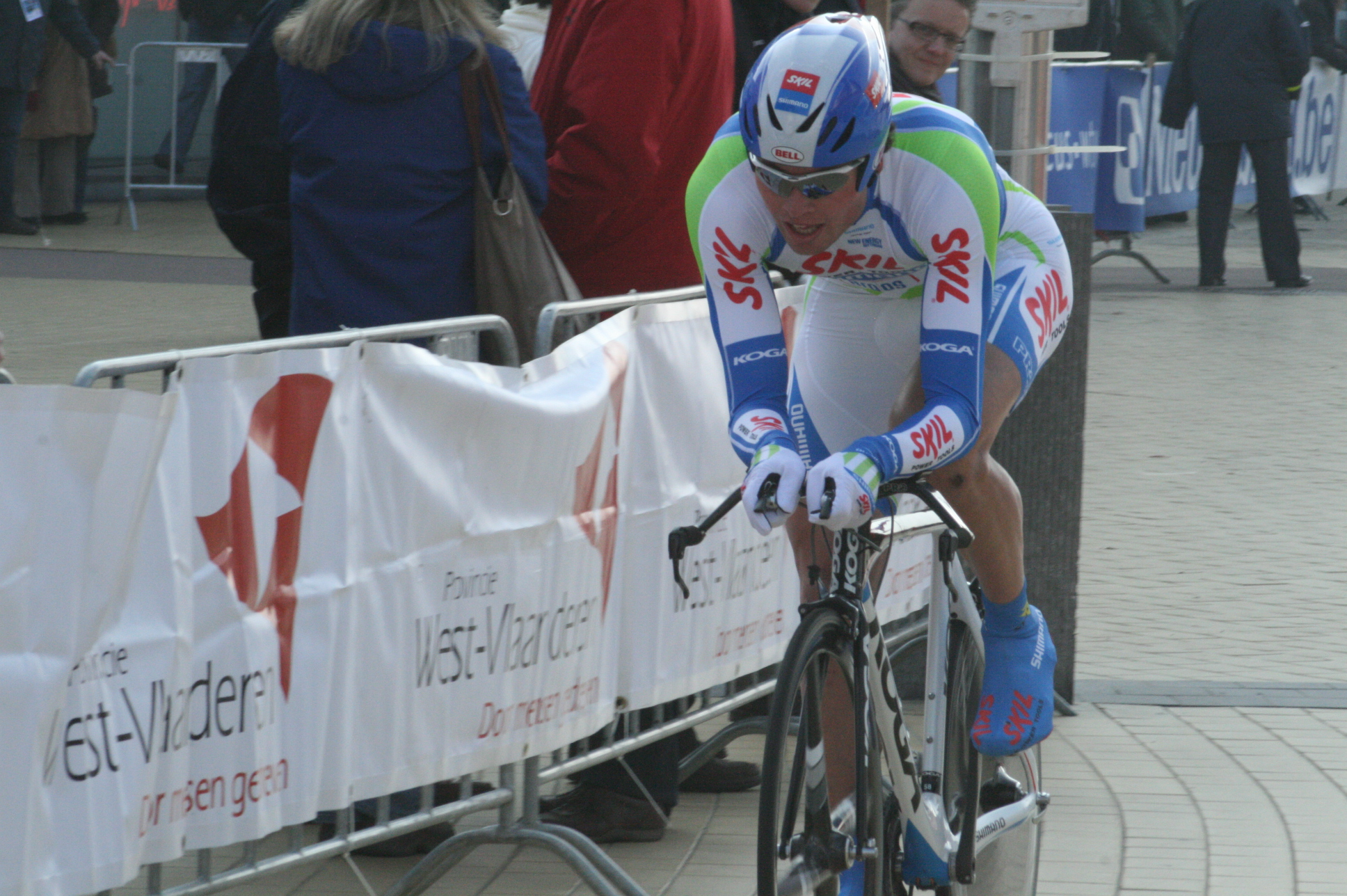

Personal information
- Born: 2 September 1988 (age 38) Meerkerk, Netherlands

Cycling career
- Sport: Cycling
- Current team: Retired
- Discipline: Road
- Role: Rider

Amateur team
- 2008: Asito Cycling Team

Professional teams
- 2008: Skil–Shimano (stagiaire)
- 2009: Cycling Team Jo Piels
- 2010–2011: Skil–Shimano
- 2012–2014: Koga Cycling Team

Robin Chaigneau (born 2 September 1988 in Meerkerk) is a Dutch former cyclist.

== Major results ==
2005
2nd Overall Trophée Centre Morbihan
2006
1st Junior National Road Race Championships
2008
1st World University Road Race Championships
1st Ronde van Overijssel
2009
3rd Ster van Zwolle
2012
1st Ster van Zwolle
