= Claude Le Ber =

French cyclist

Claude Le Ber (7 June 1931 – 14 July 2016) was a French racing cyclist. He rode three editions of the Tour de France and won the two time-trial stages of the 1956 Vuelta a España.
