= Roberto Falaschi =

Italian cyclist

Personal information
- Born: 9 June 1931 Cascina, Italy
- Died: 30 May 2009 (aged 77)

Cycling career
- Sport: Cycling
- Role: Rider

Roberto Falaschi (9 June 1931 – 30 May 2009) was an Italian professional racing cyclist. He rode in five editions of the Tour de France.
