= South American University Athletics Championships =

Asian University Athletics Championships
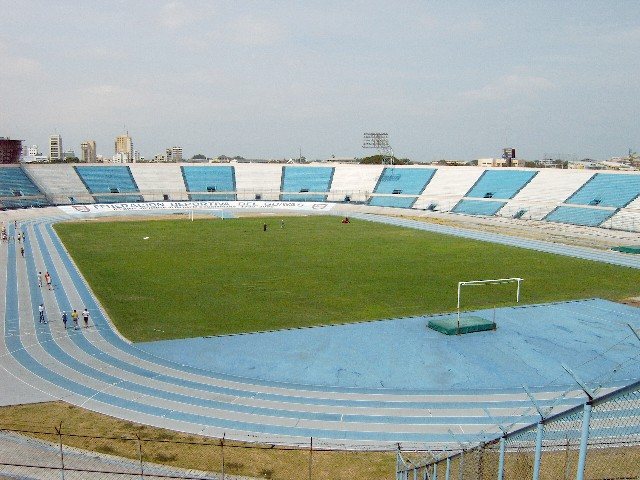
- The host stadium
- Dates: 21–22 May 2005
- Host city: Guayaquil, Ecuador
- Venue: Estadio Modelo Alberto Spencer Herrera
- Events: 42

The South American University Athletics Championships was an international athletics competition for student athletes from South American countries. It was staged on one occasion in May 2005 at the Estadio Modelo Alberto Spencer Herrera in Guayaquil, Ecuador. Four nations competed: Chile, Colombia, Ecuador and Peru. A total of 42 athletics events were contested, 22 by men and 20 by women. Women did not compete in the pole vault, 3000 metres steeplechase or half marathon, while the men did not compete in a combined track and field event. The host nation topped the medal table, winning 22 events and a total of 55 medals. Peru were runners-up with eleven gold medals, while Chile and Colombia finished with six and three gold medals, respectively.

Ecuador's Lucy Jaramillo was the most successful athlete of the competition, winning the women's 400 metres, 800 metres and 400 metres hurdles titles. Her compatriots Silvia Paredes (5000 metres, 10,000 metres) and Luis Morán (100 metres, 200 metres) won double gold. Peru's Roxana Mendoza claimed the short sprint double on the women's side. Colombia's Kelly López won a medal in all of the women's sprint events, bar the 4 × 400 metres relay (in which Colombia did not compete).

== Results ==
=== Men ===
Event	Gold		Silver		Bronze	
100 metres (wind: +2.5 m/s)	Luis Morán (ECU)	10.56w	Andrés Gallegos (ECU)	10.76w	Juan Carlos Flores (PER)	10.87w
200 metres (wind: +2.4 m/s)	Luis Morán (ECU)	21.71w	Carlos Peña (COL)	21.88w	Juan Carlos Flores (PER)	21.95w
400 metres	Carlos Peña (COL)	48.20	Rodrigo Montoya (PER)	48.94	Cristián Matute (ECU)	50.30
800 metres	Rodrigo Montoya (PER)	1:52.80	Ronny Bravo (CHI)	1:54.42	Ronny Ramírez (ECU)	1:55.50
1500 metres	Fredy Espinoza (COL)	3:54.75	José Ladino (COL)	3:56.79	Diego Moreno (PER)	3:58.51
5000 metres	José Ladino (COL)	14:?7.86	John Cusi (PER)	14:21.96	Edgar Chancusig (ECU)	14:39.94
10,000 metres	Edgar Chancusig (ECU)	31:11.44	Wilder Morales (PER)	32:02.96	Fabián Daza (COL)	32:28.07
Half marathon	Wilder Morales (PER)	1:19:03	Roberto Galarza (ECU)	1:21:05	Hendricj Sánchez (ECU)	1:23:24
110 m hurdles (wind: +2.4 m/s)	David González (ECU)	14.91w	Francisco Castro (CHI)	15.16w	Elías Valero (ECU)	15.82w
400 m hurdles	Erick Cuenca (ECU)	54.54	Jonathan Loor (ECU)	55.86	Alejandro Arbulu (PER)	55.88
3000 m steeplechase	Diego Moreno (PER)	8:57.25	Miguel Canaza (PER)	9:01.64	Cristián Patiño (ECU)	9:09.96
20 km walk	Edwin Centeno (PER)	1:31:31	Xavier Moreno (ECU)	1:39:59	Edgar Cudco (ECU)	1:44:04
High jump	Cristián Calle (ECU)	1.93 m	Francisco Castro (CHI)	1.90 m	Jorge Naranjo (CHI)	1.85 m
Pole vault	Carlos Zambrano (ECU)	4.00 m	Fabricio Egas (ECU)	3.70 m	Only two entrants	
Long jump	Carlos Jaramillo (ECU)	7.38 m	Alejandro Horn (CHI)	7.12 m w	Bernardo Vallejo (ECU)	7.03 m
Triple jump	Alejandro Horn (CHI)	15.23 m	Bernardo Vallejo (ECU)	14.91 m w	José Luis Pesántez (ECU)	14.76 m w
Shot put	Daniel Muñoz (CHI)	17.43 m	Álvaro Poblete (CHI)	15.39 m	Iván Vinelli (ECU)	13.79 m
Discus throw	Gabriel Hugo (ECU)	45.72 m	Roberto Sáez (CHI)	40.27 m	Patricio Palma (CHI)	37.25 m
Hammer throw	Roberto Sáez (CHI)	63.91 m	Patricio Palma (CHI)	63.53 m	Freimar Arias (COL)	51.98 m
Javelin throw	Andrés Dueñas (PER)	59.45 m	Edison Rosero (ECU)	51.86 m	Jorge Mina (ECU)	43.50 m
4 × 100 m relay	Peru (PER)	42.97	Ecuador (ECU)	43.10	Colombia (COL)	44.23
4 × 400 m relay	Peru (PER)	3:20.93	Ecuador (ECU)	3:21.95	Colombia (COL)	3:35.02

=== Women ===
Event	Gold		Silver		Bronze	
100 metres (wind: +0.7 m/s)	Roxana Mendoza (PER)	12.40	Ana Caicedo (ECU)	12.42	Kelly López (COL)	12.85
200 metres (wind: +1.5 m/s)	Roxana Mendoza (PER)	25.56	Kelly López (COL)	25.63	Mayra Pachito (ECU)	25.70
400 metres	Lucy Jaramillo (ECU)	54.78	Kelly López (COL)	57.11	Claudia Meneses (PER)	57.92
800 metres	Lucy Jaramillo (ECU)	2:11.10	Gladys Tapia (CHI)	2:14.50	Mónica Amboyo (ECU)	2:16.16
1500 metres	Mónica Amboyo (ECU)	4:36.69	Paola Bonilla (ECU)	4:41.65	Gladys Tapia (CHI)	4:44.03
5000 metres	Silvia Paredes (ECU)	17:55.60	Paola Bonilla (ECU)	18:03.43	Mariela Jaén (PER)	18:34.63
10,000 metres	Silvia Paredes (ECU)	38:53.15	Mariela Jaén (PER)	39:21.42	Karla Silva (PER)	40:20.05
100 m hurdles (wind: +0.3 m/s)	Patricia Riesco (PER)	13.85	Francisca Guzmán (CHI)	14.38	Martina Valoyes (COL)	14.90
400 m hurdles	Lucy Jaramillo (ECU)	59.91	Patricia Riesco (PER)	62.55	Martina Valoyes (COL)	62.66
20 km walk	Tatiana Orellana (ECU)	1:46:43	Magaly Andrade (ECU)	1:47:35	Marcela Pacheco (CHI)	1:50:28
High jump	Kerstin Weiss (CHI)	1.76 m	Tatiana Rodríguez (COL)	1.65 m	Jenny Pesántez (ECU)	1.65 m
Long jump	Ana Caicedo (ECU)	6.04 m	Yolanda Mina (COL)	5.80 m	Yariku Yabiku (PER)	5.18 m
Triple jump	María Batallas (ECU)	12.46 m	Mayra Pachito (ECU)	12.19 m w	Tatiana Rodríguez (COL)	11.68 m
Shot put	Marianne Berndt (CHI)	15.09 m	Susan Sulzer (CHI)	13.06 m	Karina Díaz (ECU)	13.04 m
Discus throw	Karina Díaz (ECU)	46.99 m	Marianne Berndt (CHI)	46.68 m	Susan Sulzer (CHI)	39.48 m
Hammer throw	Odette Palma (CHI)	54.13 m	Karina Díaz (ECU)	50.86 m	Johana Martínez (COL)	40.57 m
Javelin throw	Noelia Paredes (PER)	42.58 m	Jessica Granda (ECU)	39.38 m	Jessica Medranda (ECU)	35.24 m
Heptathlon	Victoria Quiñónez (ECU)	4197 pts	Yariku Yabiku (PER)	3574 pts	Johana Caicedo (ECU)	2696 pts
4 × 100 m relay	Ecuador (ECU)	47.82	Peru (PER)	48.86	Colombia (COL)	49.65
4 × 400 m relay	Ecuador (ECU)	3:54.09	Peru (PER)	3:55.33	Only two teams started	

== Medal table ==
* Host nation (Ecuador)

Rank	Nation	Gold	Silver	Bronze	Total
1	Ecuador (ECU)*	22	16	17	55
2	Peru (PER)	11	9	8	28
3	Chile (CHI)	6	11	5	22
4	Colombia (COL)	3	6	10	19
Totals (4 entries)		42	42	40	124
