= Miguel Chacón (Spanish cyclist) =

Spanish cyclist

Personal information
- Full name: Miguel Chacón Díaz
- Born: 14 January 1930 Sabadell, Spain
- Died: 28 July 2011 (aged 81) Togo

Cycling career
- Sport: Cycling
- Role: Rider

Miguel Chacón Díaz (14 January 1930 – 28 July 2011) was a Spanish professional racing cyclist. He rode in the 1956 Tour de France. He died in Togo on 28 July 2011. His cycling career lasted 10 years (1951–1961).
