= Jean Bobet =

French cyclist (1930–2022)

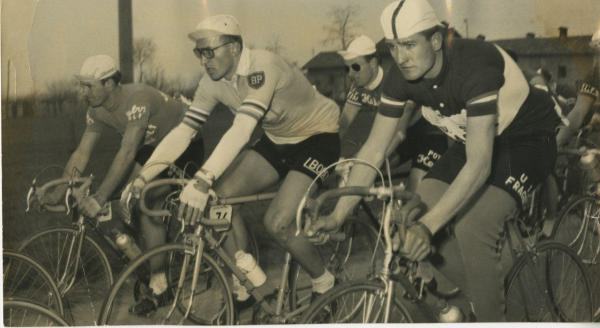
- Bobet (center) in 1956

Personal information
- Full name: Jean Bobet
- Born: 22 February 1930 Saint-Méen-le-Grand, France
- Died: 27 July 2022 (aged 92) Lorient, France

Cycling career
- Sport: Cycling
- Discipline: Road
- Role: Rider

Major wins
- Stage races Paris–Nice (1955)

Jean Bobet (22 February 1930 – 27 July 2022) was a French road bicycle racer. He was the younger brother of Louison Bobet. Less successful, he nevertheless won the world students' championship as an amateur and then, as a professional, Paris–Nice in 1955, Genoa–Nice in 1956 and the Circuit du Morbihan in 1953. He came third in Milan–San Remo in 1953. He rode from 1949 to 1959, including all three Grand Tours.

He and his brother retired from racing after a car carrying them crashed outside Paris in the autumn of 1960. Louison went into business ventures and Jean became a journalist. He became head of sport at Radio Luxembourg, wrote for L'Équipe and then Le Monde. He made occasional contributions to Miroir du Cyclisme and still (2008) appears on television, notably in retrospective programmes. He was instrumental in forming a museum in his brother's memory in Saint-Méen-le-Grand.

He wrote several books, including Louison Bobet, une vélobiographie (Éditions Gallimard, 1958), an account of life with his brother in Demain on roule (Editions de la Table Ronde, 2004), translated as Tomorrow We Ride (Mousehold Press, 2008), and a history of Octave Lapize, one of the first stars of the Tour de France: Lapize, celui-là était un 'as' (Editions de la Table Ronde, 2003), translated as Lapize ... now there was an ace (Mousehold Press, 2010).

== Teams ==
- 1949–1951 Stella-Dunlop
- 1952 Stella-Huret
- 1953 Bottecchia and Stella-Wolber-Dunlop
- 1954 Stella-Wolber-Dunlop
- 1955 L. Bobet-BP-Hutchinson and Mercier-Hutchinson
- 1956 L. Bobet-BP-Hutchinson
- 1957 L. Bobet-BP-Hutchinson, Mercier-BP-Hutchinson and Velo Club Bustese
- 1958–1959 L. Bobet-BP-Hutchinson

== Achievements ==
1949

- World University Cycling Champion
- World student team time-trial champion

1950

- World University Cycling Champion

1951

- 1st Tour de l'Orne
- 1st Lannion–Rennes
- 1st Circuit de la Vallée de Loire

1952

- 1st Dinan
- 1st Hautmont

1953

- 1st Circuit de Morbihan
- 1st Grand Prix d'Europe

1955

- 1st Paris–Nice and one stage win
- 1st Scaer

1956

- 1st Genoa–Nice

1959

- 1st Lodève

=== Tour de France ===
- 1955 14th
- 1957 15th

=== Giro d'Italia ===
- 1953 Did not finish
- 1957 25th
- 1958 Did not finish (11th stage)

=== Vuelta a España ===
- 1956 Did not finish (16th stage)
