= International University Sports Federation =

International student sports governing body

- Fédération internationale du sport universitaire (FISU)

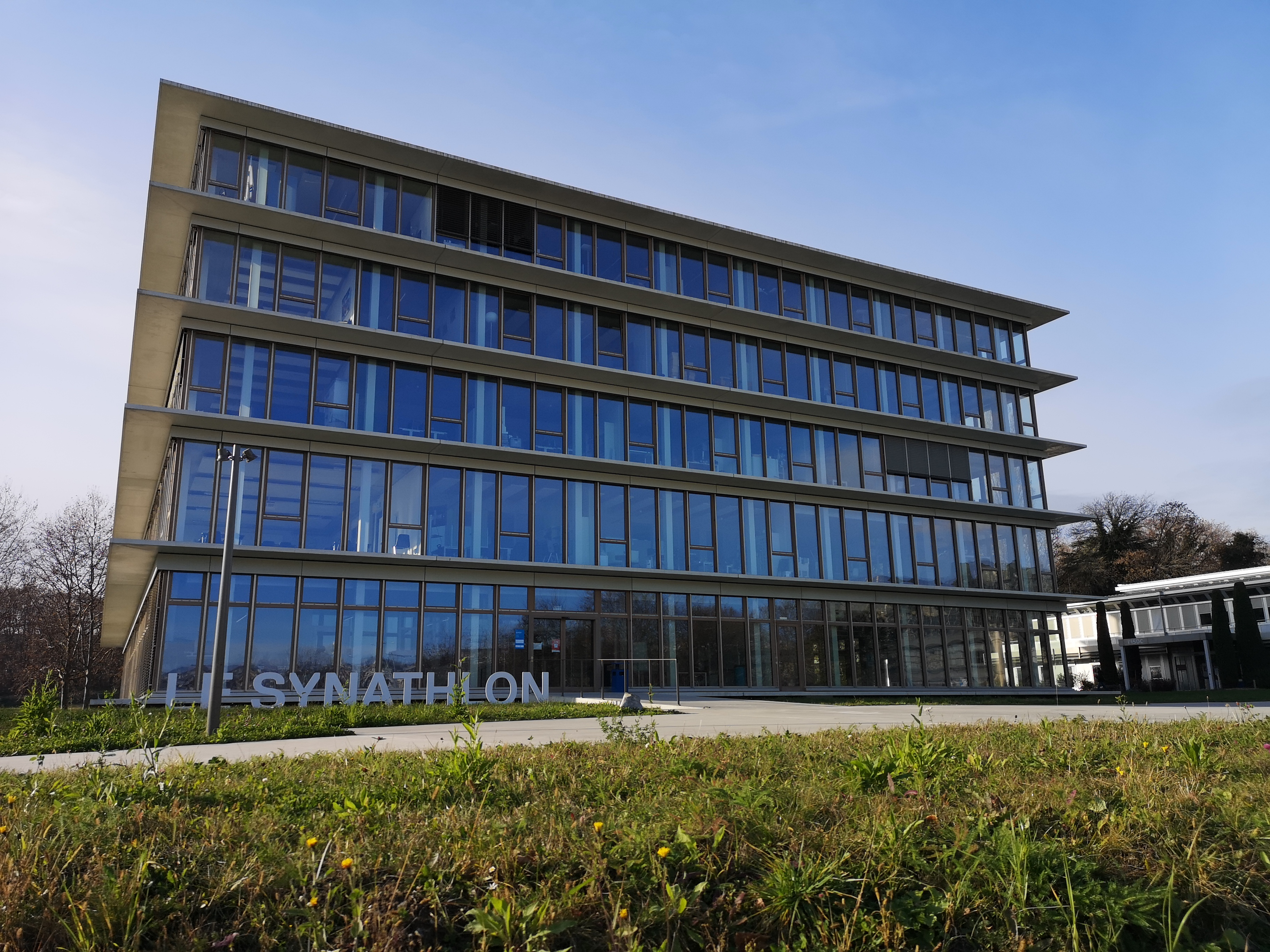
- Headquarters in Lausanne.
- Formation: 1 January 1949; 77 years ago
- Type: Sports federation
- Headquarters: 1949–2011: Brussels, Belgium; since 2011: Lausanne, Switzerland
- Members: 165 member associations
- Official language: French and English
- President: Leonz Eder (Switzerland)
- Regional Vice-Presidents: Luciano Cabral (BRA) (1st Vp), Penninah Aligawesa Kabenge (UGA); Marian Dymalski (POL); Liu Jin (CHN)
- Website: fisu.net

The International University Sports Federation (French: Fédération internationale du sport universitaire, FISU) is responsible for the organization and governance of worldwide sports competitions for student athletes between the ages of 17 and 25. It was founded in 1949 as the world governing body of national university sports organizations and currently has 165 member associations (National University Sport Federations) from five continents. From 1949 and 2011 it was based in Brussels, Belgium, and then relocated to Lausanne, Switzerland.

The FISU stages its events every two years. They currently include three World University Games (beach, summer and winter) and 34 World University Championships. It also organizes conferences, forums and seminars to promote sport as a component of the educational system. FISU sanctions other competitions open to university students, such as the biennial World University Bridge Championships in contract bridge, "played under the auspices of the FISU".

== Organization ==
A General Assembly elects an executive committee for a four-year term. Oleg Matytsin was elected president for 2015–2019, succeeding Claude-Louis Gallien. The secretary-general and CEO is Eric Saintrond; regional vice-presidents are Leonz Eder, Luciano Cabral, Marian Dymalski, Leopold Senghor and Liguo Yang.

Past presidents include:

- 1949–1961: Paul Schleimer (LUX)
- 1961–1999: Primo Nebiolo (ITA)
- 1999–2011: George E. Killian (USA)
- 2011–2015: Claude–Louis Gallien (FRA)
- 2015–2022: Oleg Matytsin (RUS)
- 2022–2027: Leonz Eder (SUI)

== Continental associations ==
There are five continental associations of the International University Sports Federation:

- Africa University Sports (FASU) since 1971
- Asian University Sports Federation (AUSF) since 1992
- European University Sports Association since 1999
- FISU Americas since 2007
- FISU Oceania since 2008

== Events and sports ==
=== Summer ===
The FISU World University Games, formerly and commonly referred to as the Universiade, is an international sporting event staged every two years in a different city. There were 7.966 athletes in Kazan in 2013, and 174 participating countries in Daegu, South Korea, in 2003.:

The current programme of the Summer Universiade includes 12 compulsory sports (15 compulsory disciplines):

- Athletics
- Swimming
- Diving
- Water polo
- Archery
- Badminton
- Basketball
- Fencing
- Artistic gymnastics
- Rhythmic gymnastics
- Judo
- Table tennis
- Taekwondo
- Tennis
- Volleyball

=== Winter ===
Starting in 2025,the Winter Games includes ten compulsory sports, and one to four optional sports are chosen by the host country or city. If speed skating is on the list of the optional sports, a fourth could be chosen.

- Alpine skiing
- Biathlon
- Cross-country skiing
- Curling
- Figure skating
- Freestyle skiing
- Ice hockey
- Ski orienteering
- Short track speed skating
- Snowboarding

=== World University Championships ===
While the Universiades are held in odd years, the FISU World University Championships are held in even years. It includes individual/team sports, indoor/outdoor sports, combat sports, mind sports and summer/winter sports.

=== International Day of University Sport ===
The International Day of University Sport is celebrated every year on 20 September by the FISU and UNESCO.

=== Continental ===
- All-Africa University Games
- ASEAN University Games
- Asian University Athletics Championships
- European Universities Games
- FISU America Games
- SELL Student Games
- South American University Athletics Championships

== Banning ==
In light of the 2022 Russian invasion of Ukraine, FISU suspended Russian and Belarusian athletes and national university sports federation officials from participating in FISU competitions and activities until at least the end of 2022, cancelled two FISU University World Cups in Russia and a FISU World University Championships in Belarus scheduled for 2022 (the FISU University World Cup Powerlifting from Moscow, the FISU University World Cup Rugby Sevens from Kazan, and the FISU World University Championship Waterski & Wakeboard from Belarus), and cancelled Russia's hosting of the FISU University World Cup Combat Sports and associated meetings scheduled for 2022. The FISU also suspended the hosting rights and cancelled the 2023 Summer World University Games, scheduled for Yekaterinburg.

== See also ==
- International Academy of Sport Science and Technology
- International Olympic Committee
- International School Sport Federation
- Lausanne campus
- Maison du Sport International
