= List of teams and cyclists in the 1961 Giro d'Italia =

The 1961 Giro d'Italia was the 44th edition of the Giro d'Italia, one of cycling's Grand Tours. The field consisted of 170 riders, and 92 riders finished the race.

== By rider ==
Legend
No.	Starting number worn by the rider during the Giro
Pos.	Position in the general classification
DNF	Denotes a rider who did not finish

No.	Name	Nationality	Team	Ref
1	Jacques Anquetil	France	Helyett–Fynsec–Hutchinson	
2	Jean Stablinski	France	Helyett–Fynsec–Hutchinson	
3	Édouard Delberghe	France	Helyett–Fynsec–Hutchinson	
4	Mies Stolker	Netherlands	Helyett–Fynsec–Hutchinson	
5	Seamus Elliott	Ireland	Helyett–Fynsec–Hutchinson	
6	Louis Rostollan	France	Helyett–Fynsec–Hutchinson	
7	André Cloarec	France	Helyett–Fynsec–Hutchinson	
8	Raymond Huguet	France	Helyett–Fynsec–Hutchinson	
9	Jean Le Lan	France	Helyett–Fynsec–Hutchinson	
10	René Binggeli	Switzerland	Helyett–Fynsec–Hutchinson	
11	Vito Favero	Italy	Atala	
12	Vito Taccone	Italy	Atala	
13	Antonino Catalano	Italy	Atala	
14	Pietro Zoppas	Italy	Atala	
15	Renato Spinello	Italy	Atala	
16	Antonio Franchi	Italy	Atala	
17	Luigi Zanchetta	Italy	Atala	
18	Armando Casodi	Italy	Atala	
19	Nello Velucchi	Italy	Atala	
20	Giuseppe Vanzella	Italy	Atala	
21	Angelo Conterno	Italy	Baratti	
22	Ernesto Minetto	Italy	Baratti	
23	Ezio Pizzoglio	Italy	Baratti	
24	Willy Vannitsen	Belgium	Baratti	
25	Catullo Ciacci	Italy	Baratti	
26	Martin Van Geneugden	Belgium	Baratti	
27	Roger De Coninck	Belgium	Baratti	
28	Florent Van Pollaert	Belgium	Baratti	
29	Attilio Moresi	Switzerland	Baratti	
30	Sergio Braga	Italy	Baratti	
31	Antonio Bailetti	Italy	Bianchi	
32	Franco Balmamion	Italy	Bianchi	
33	Antonio Dal Col	Italy	Bianchi	
34	Torino Domenicali	Italy	Bianchi	
35	Bruno Mealli	Italy	Bianchi	
36	Vittorio Poiano	Italy	Bianchi	
37	Gaetano Sarazin	Italy	Bianchi	
38	Giuseppe Sartore	Italy	Bianchi	
39	Silvano Simonetti	Italy	Bianchi	
40	Sergio Maggioni	Italy	Bianchi	
41	Nino Defilippis	Italy	Carpano	
42	Walter Martin	Italy	Carpano	
43	Arnaldo Di Maria	Italy	Carpano	
44	Germano Barale	Italy	Carpano	
45	Italo Mazzacurati	Italy	Carpano	
46	Stefano Gaggero	Italy	Carpano	
47	Hilaire Couvreur	Belgium	Carpano	
48	Gilbert Desmet	Belgium	Carpano	
49	Yvo Molenaers	Belgium	Carpano	
50	Kurt Gimmi	Switzerland	Carpano	
51	Salvador Botella	Spain	EMI	
52	Jesús Galdeano	Spain	EMI	
53	Gabriel Company	Spain	EMI	
54	José Herrero Berrendero	Spain	EMI	
55	Gabriel Mas	Spain	EMI	
56	Francisco Moreno	Spain	EMI	
57	Salvador Rosa	Spain	EMI	
58	Antonio Suárez	Spain	EMI	
59	Antonio Bertrán	Spain	EMI	
60	Santiago Montilla	Spain	EMI	
61	Rik Van Looy	Belgium	Faema	
62	Louis Proost	Belgium	Faema	
63	Edgard Sorgeloos	Belgium	Faema	
64	Raymond Impanis	Belgium	Faema	
65	Piet van Est	Netherlands	Faema	
66	Armand Desmet	Belgium	Faema	
67	Guillaume Van Tongerloo	Belgium	Faema	
68	Willy Schroeders	Belgium	Faema	
69	Willy Derboven	Belgium	Faema	
70	Friedhelm Fischerkeller	West Germany	Faema	
71	Arnaldo Pambianco	Italy	Fides	
72	Pierino Baffi	Italy	Fides	
73	Waldemaro Bartolozzi	Italy	Fides	
74	Oreste Magni	Italy	Fides	
75	Peppino Dante	Italy	Fides	
76	Idrio Bui	Italy	Fides	
77	Nino Assirelli	Italy	Fides	
78	Augusto Marcaletti	Italy	Fides	
79	Giancarlo Gentina	Italy	Fides	
80	Luigi Zaimbro	Italy	Fides	
81	Charly Gaul	Luxembourg	Gazzola–Fiorelli	
82	Hans Junkermann	West Germany	Gazzola–Fiorelli	
83	Marcel Ernzer	Luxembourg	Gazzola–Fiorelli	
84	Aldo Bolzan	Luxembourg	Gazzola–Fiorelli	
85	Roger Thull	Luxembourg	Gazzola–Fiorelli	
86	Arigo Padovan	Italy	Gazzola–Fiorelli	
87	Gianni Ferlenghi	Italy	Gazzola–Fiorelli	
88	Luigi Mele	Italy	Gazzola–Fiorelli	
89	Wilfried Thaler	Austria	Gazzola–Fiorelli	
90	Franco Malatesta	Italy	Gazzola–Fiorelli	
91	Jos Hoevenaers	Belgium	Ghigi	
92	Livio Trapè	Italy	Ghigi	
93	Aldo Moser	Italy	Ghigi	
94	Vendramino Bariviera	Italy	Ghigi	
95	Luciano Gaggioli	Italy	Ghigi	
96	Mario Minieri	Italy	Ghigi	
97	Angiolino Piscaglia	Italy	Ghigi	
98	Luigi Sarti	Italy	Ghigi	
99	Franco Canciani	Italy	Ghigi	
100	Guido Boni	Italy	Ghigi	
101	Ercole Baldini	Italy	Ignis	
102	Dino Bruni	Italy	Ignis	
103	Rino Benedetti	Italy	Ignis	
104	Noé Conti	Italy	Ignis	
105	Agostino Coletto	Italy	Ignis	
106	Miguel Poblet	Spain	Ignis	
107	Aurelio Cestari	Italy	Ignis	
108	Nello Fabbri	Italy	Ignis	
109	Carlo Guarguaglini	Italy	Ignis	
110	Giuseppe Tonucci	Italy	Ignis	
111	Renzo Accordi	Italy	Legnano	
112	Graziano Battistini	Italy	Legnano	
113	Giovanni Bettinelli	Italy	Legnano	
114	Gilberto Brugnolo	Italy	Legnano	
115	Vittorio Casati	Italy	Legnano	
116	Franco Cribiori	Italy	Legnano	
117	Renzo Fontona	Italy	Legnano	
118	Giacomo Grioni	Italy	Legnano	
119	Giancarlo Manzoni	Italy	Legnano	
120	Imerio Massignan	Italy	Legnano	
121	Romeo Venturelli	Italy	Molteni	
122	Adriano Zamboni	Italy	Molteni	
123	Giuseppe Fallarini	Italy	Molteni	
124	Pietro Chiodini	Italy	Molteni	
125	Bruno Costalunga	Italy	Molteni	
126	Mario Bampi	Italy	Molteni	
127	Giacomo Fornoni	Italy	Molteni	
128	Nunzio Pelliaciari	Italy	Molteni	
129	Luigi Arienti	Italy	Molteni	
130	Gianantonio Ricco	Italy	Molteni	
131	Guido Carlesi	Italy	Philco	
132	Silvano Ciampi	Italy	Philco	
133	Paris Montanelli	Italy	Philco	
134	Roberto Falaschi	Italy	Philco	
135	Rolf Graf	Switzerland	Philco	
136	Pietro Musone	Italy	Philco	
137	Alfredo Sabbadin	Italy	Philco	
138	Giacomo Fini	Italy	Philco	
139	Marino Vigna	Italy	Philco	
140	Ottavio Cogliati	Italy	Philco	
141	Carlo Azzini	Italy	San Pellegrino	
142	Ernesto Bono	Italy	San Pellegrino	
143	Giuseppe Fezzardi	Italy	San Pellegrino	
144	Marino Fontana	Italy	San Pellegrino	
145	Silvestro La Cioppa	Italy	San Pellegrino	
146	Ugo Massocco	Italy	San Pellegrino	
147	Giorgio Menini	Italy	San Pellegrino	
148	Luigi Tezza	Italy	San Pellegrino	
149	Giorgio Tinazzi	Italy	San Pellegrino	
150	Benito Venturini	Italy	San Pellegrino	
151	Carlo Brugnami	Italy	Torpado	
152	Antonio Accorsi	Italy	Torpado	
153	Mariano Franceschetto	Italy	Torpado	
154	Federico Galeaz	Italy	Torpado	
155	Renato Giusti	Italy	Torpado	
156	Loris Guernieri	Italy	Torpado	
157	Dino Liviero	Italy	Torpado	
158	Giovanni Pettinati	Italy	Torpado	
159	Giovanni Verucchi	Italy	Torpado	
160	Giuseppe Zorzi	Italy	Torpado	
161	Federico Bahamontes	Spain	VOV	
162	Vittorio Adorni	Italy	VOV	
163	Pasquale Fornara	Italy	VOV	
164	Alfredo Bonariva	Italy	VOV	
165	Ivan Burigotto	Italy	VOV	
166	Giovanni Garau	Italy	VOV	
167	Addo Kazianka	Italy	VOV	
168	Giovanni Metra	Italy	VOV	
169	Armando Pellegrini	Italy	VOV	
170	Giuseppe Pintarelli	Italy	VOV	
