= List of teams and cyclists in the 1960 Giro d'Italia =

The 1960 Giro d'Italia was the 43rd edition of the Giro d'Italia, one of cycling's Grand Tours. The field consisted of 140 riders, and 97 riders finished the race.

== By rider ==
Legend
No.	Starting number worn by the rider during the Giro
Pos.	Position in the general classification
DNF	Denotes a rider who did not finish

No.	Name	Nationality	Team	Ref
1	Charly Gaul	Luxembourg	EMI–Guerra	
2	Marcel Ernzer	Luxembourg	EMI–Guerra	
3	Pasquale Fornara	Italy	EMI–Guerra	
4	Aldo Moser	Italy	EMI–Guerra	
5	Giuseppe Pintarelli	Italy	EMI–Guerra	
6	Armando Pellegrini	Italy	EMI–Guerra	
7	Addo Kazianka	Italy	EMI–Guerra	
8	Giovanni Metra	Italy	EMI–Guerra	
9	Marcello Chiti	Italy	EMI–Guerra	
10	Carlo Guarguaglini	Italy	EMI–Guerra	
11	Vito Favero	Italy	Atala	
12	Giulio Favaro	Italy	Atala	
13	Nello Velucchi	Italy	Atala	
14	Rizzardo Brenioli	Italy	Atala	
15	Antonio Uliana	Italy	Atala	
16	Giuseppe Vanzella	Italy	Atala	
17	Arturo Neri	Italy	Atala	
18	Armando Casodi	Italy	Atala	
19	Massimiliano Becchi	Italy	Atala	
20	Fiorenzo Tomasin	Italy	Atala	
21	Diego Ronchini	Italy	Bianchi	
22	Antonio Catalano	Italy	Bianchi	
23	Germano Barale	Italy	Bianchi	
24	Pietro Chiodini	Italy	Bianchi	
25	Pietro Musone	Italy	Bianchi	
26	Antonio Domenicali	Italy	Bianchi	
27	Italo Mazzacurati	Italy	Bianchi	
28	Walter Almaviva	Italy	Bianchi	
29	Antonio Dal Col	Italy	Bianchi	
30	Giuseppe Sartore	Italy	Bianchi	
31	Gastone Nencini	Italy	Carpano	
32	Nino Defilippis	Italy	Carpano	
33	Angelo Conterno	Italy	Carpano	
34	Ezio Pizzoglio	Italy	Carpano	
35	Stefano Gaggero	Italy	Carpano	
36	Désiré Keteleer	Belgium	Carpano	
37	Willy Vannitsen	Belgium	Carpano	
38	Michel Van Aerde	Belgium	Carpano	
39	Yvo Molenaers	Belgium	Carpano	
40	Gilbert Desmet	Belgium	Carpano	
41	Rik Van Looy	Belgium	Faema	
42	Raymond Impanis	Belgium	Faema	
43	Edgard Sorgeloos	Belgium	Faema	
44	Frans Van Looveren	Belgium	Faema	
45	René Van Meenen	Belgium	Faema	
46	Norbert Kerckhove	Belgium	Faema	
47	Gabriel Mas	Spain	Faema	
48	Salvador Botella	Spain	Faema	
49	Antonio Bertrán	Spain	Faema	
50	Jesús Galdeano	Spain	Faema	
51	Jacques Anquetil	France	Helyett–Leroux–Fynsec–Hutchinson	
52	André Darrigade	France	Helyett–Leroux–Fynsec–Hutchinson	
53	Jean Stablinski	France	Helyett–Leroux–Fynsec–Hutchinson	
54	Louis Rostollan	France	Helyett–Leroux–Fynsec–Hutchinson	
55	Hilaire Couvreur	Belgium	Helyett–Leroux–Fynsec–Hutchinson	
56	Michel Stolker	Netherlands	Helyett–Leroux–Fynsec–Hutchinson	
57	Édouard Delberghe	France	Helyett–Leroux–Fynsec–Hutchinson	
58	Raymond Hoorelbeke	France	Helyett–Leroux–Fynsec–Hutchinson	
59	Jo de Roo	Netherlands	Helyett–Leroux–Fynsec–Hutchinson	
60	Seamus Elliott	Ireland	Helyett–Leroux–Fynsec–Hutchinson	
61	Hans Junkermann	West Germany	Gazzola–Fiorelli	
62	Friedhelm Fischerkeller	West Germany	Gazzola–Fiorelli	
63	Alessandro Fantini	Italy	Gazzola–Fiorelli	
64	Michele Gismondi	Italy	Gazzola–Fiorelli	
65	Guglielmo Garello	Italy	Gazzola–Fiorelli	
66	Ugo Massocco	Italy	Gazzola–Fiorelli	
67	Arigo Padovan	Italy	Gazzola–Fiorelli	
68	Giovanni Pettinati	Italy	Gazzola–Fiorelli	
69	Alfred Rüegg	Switzerland	Gazzola–Fiorelli	
70	Franz Reitz	West Germany	Gazzola–Fiorelli	
71	Jos Hoevenaers	Belgium	Ghigi	
72	Rino Benedetti	Italy	Ghigi	
73	Agostino Coletto	Italy	Ghigi	
74	Guido Boni	Italy	Ghigi	
75	Noè Conti	Italy	Ghigi	
76	Mario Minieri	Italy	Ghigi	
77	Angiolino Piscaglia	Italy	Ghigi	
78	Idrio Bui	Italy	Ghigi	
79	Enrico Paoletti	Italy	Ghigi	
80	Piero Gattoni	Italy	Ghigi	
81	Pierino Baffi	Italy	Ignis	
82	Ercole Baldini	Italy	Ignis	
83	Waldemaro Bartolozzi	Italy	Ignis	
84	Dino Bruni	Italy	Ignis	
85	Aurelio Cestari	Italy	Ignis	
86	Luciano Ciancola	Italy	Ignis	
87	Peppino Dante	Italy	Ignis	
88	Roberto Falaschi	Italy	Ignis	
89	Giuseppe Fallarini	Italy	Ignis	
90	Miguel Poblet	Spain	Ignis	
91	Nino Assirelli	Italy	Legnano	
92	Carlo Azzini	Italy	Legnano	
93	Graziano Battistini	Italy	Legnano	
94	Giovanni Bettinelli	Italy	Legnano	
95	Vittorio Casati	Italy	Legnano	
96	Giacomo Grioni	Italy	Legnano	
97	Imerio Massignan	Italy	Legnano	
98	Arnaldo Pambianco	Italy	Legnano	
99	Giuseppe Pardini	Italy	Legnano	
100	Remo Tamagni	Italy	Legnano	
101	Wout Wagtmans	Netherlands	Molteni	
102	Coen Niesten	Netherlands	Molteni	
103	Piet Damen	Netherlands	Molteni	
104	André Vlayen	Belgium	Molteni	
105	Alcide Vaucher	Switzerland	Molteni	
106	Luigi Tezza	Italy	Molteni	
107	Giuliano Natucci	Italy	Molteni	
108	Gian-Antonio Ricco	Italy	Molteni	
109	Bruno Costalunga	Italy	Molteni	
110	Mario Bampi	Italy	Molteni	
111	Jan Adriaensens	Belgium	Philco	
112	Wim van Est	Netherlands	Philco	
113	Emile Daems	Belgium	Philco	
114	Guido Carlesi	Italy	Philco	
115	Silvano Ciampi	Italy	Philco	
116	Alfredo Sabbadin	Italy	Philco	
117	Cleto Maule	Italy	Philco	
118	Giacomo Fini	Italy	Philco	
119	Vinicio Marsili	Italy	Philco	
120	Amico Ippoliti	Italy	Philco	
121	Romeo Venturelli	Italy	San Pellegrino	
122	Ernesto Bono	Italy	San Pellegrino	
123	Sergio Braga	Italy	San Pellegrino	
124	Franco Da Ros	Italy	San Pellegrino	
125	Marino Fontana	Italy	San Pellegrino	
126	Giancarlo Gentina	Italy	San Pellegrino	
127	Giancarlo Manzoni	Italy	San Pellegrino	
128	Nunzio Pellicciari	Italy	San Pellegrino	
129	Duilio Taddeucci	Italy	San Pellegrino	
130	Pietro Zoppas	Italy	San Pellegrino	
131	Adriano Zamboni	Italy	Torpado	
132	Dino Liviero	Italy	Torpado	
133	Carlo Brugnami	Italy	Torpado	
134	Renzo Accordi	Italy	Torpado	
135	Antonio Accorsi	Italy	Torpado	
136	Mariano Franceschetto	Italy	Torpado	
137	Federico Galeaz	Italy	Torpado	
138	Tristano Tinarelli	Italy	Torpado	
139	Mario Tosato	Italy	Torpado	
140	Gino Vignolo	Italy	Torpado	
