= 1961 Giro di Lombardia =

Race details
- Dates: 21 October 1961
- Stages: 1
- Distance: 253 km (157.2 mi)
- Winning time: 7h 06' 21"

Results
	Winner	Vito Taccone (ITA)	(Atala)
	Second	Imerio Massignan (ITA)	(Legnano)
	Third	Renzo Fontona (ITA)	(Legnano)

The 1961 Giro di Lombardia was the 55th edition of the Giro di Lombardia cycle race and was held on 21 October 1961. The race started in Milan and finished in Como. The race was won by Vito Taccone of the Atala team.

== General classification ==
Final general classification

Rank	Rider	Team	Time
1	Vito Taccone (ITA)	Atala	7h 06' 21"
2	Imerio Massignan (ITA)	Legnano	+ 3"
3	Renzo Fontona (ITA)	Legnano	+ 1' 48"
4	Carlo Brugnami (ITA)	Torpado	+ 2' 38"
5	Graziano Battistini (ITA)	Legnano	+ 2' 38"
6	Giuseppe Dante (ITA)	Fides	+ 2' 58"
7	Nino Defilippis (ITA)	Carpano	+ 3' 41"
8	Angelo Conterno (ITA)	Baratti–Milano	+ 3' 41"
9	Aldo Moser (ITA)	Ghigi	+ 3' 41"
10	Arnaldo Pambianco (ITA)	Fides	+ 3' 41"
