= 1960 Giro di Lombardia =

Race details
- Dates: 16 October 1960
- Stages: 1
- Distance: 226 km (140.4 mi)
- Winning time: 5h 33' 46"

Results
| | Winner | Emile Daems (BEL) | (Philco) |
| | Second | Diego Ronchini (ITA) | (Bianchi) |
| | Third | Marino Fontana (ITA) | (San Pellegrino) |

The 1960 Giro di Lombardia was the 54th edition of the Giro di Lombardia cycle race and was held on 16 October 1960. The race started and finished in Milan. The race was won by Emile Daems of the Philco team.

== General classification ==
Final general classification

| Rank | Rider | Team | Time |
|---|---|---|---|
| 1 | Emile Daems (BEL) | Philco | 5h 33' 46" |
| 2 | Diego Ronchini (ITA) | Bianchi | + 0" |
| 3 | Marino Fontana (ITA) | San Pellegrino | + 0" |
| 4 | Michel Stolker (NED) | Helyett | + 0" |
| 5 | Ezio Pizzoglio (ITA) | Carpano | + 0" |
| 6 | Romeo Venturelli (ITA) | San Pellegrino | + 0" |
| 7 | Carlo Brugnami (ITA) | Torpado | + 0" |
| 8 | Imerio Massignan (ITA) | Legnano | + 0" |
| 9 | Silvano Ciampi (ITA) | Philco | + 2' 31" |
| 10 | Rino Benedetti (ITA) | Ghigi | + 2' 31" |
