= Giro dell'Appennino =

Italian one-day road cycling race

Race details
- Date: Varies
- Region: Apennine Mountains, Italy
- English name: Tour of the Apennines
- Local name: Giro dell'Appennino (in Italian)
- Discipline: Road
- Competition: UCI Europe Tour
- Type: One-day
- Web site: www.uspontedecimo.it

History
- First edition: 1934
- Editions: 87 (as of 2026)
- First winner: Augusto Como (ITA)
- Most wins: Gianbattista Baronchelli (ITA) (6 wins)
- Most recent: Ludovico Crescioli (ITA)

The Giro dell'Appennino is a semi classic European bicycle race held in the Apennine Mountains, Italy. Since 2005, the race has been organised as a 1.1 event on the UCI Europe Tour.

Famous riders like Fausto Coppi, Francesco Moser, Felice Gimondi, Gianni Bugno and Gilberto Simoni have won the race.

== Winners ==
Year	Country	Rider	Team
1934	Italy	Augusto Como	Girardengo SS
1935	Italy	Augusto Como	Polisportiva Giordana
1936	Italy	Settimio Simonini	individual
1937	Italy	Cino Cinelli	individual
1938	Italy	Luigi Ferrando	Tellini
1939	Italy	Lorenzo Mazzarello	OND Novi Ligure
1940– 1945	No race		
1946	Italy	Enrico Mollo	Benotto–Superga
1947	Italy	Alfredo Martini	Welter
1948	Italy	Settimio Simonini	Viani Cral Imperia
1949	Italy	Dino Rossi	Cimatti
1950	Italy	Renzo Soldani	Legnano
1951	Italy	Rinaldo Moresco	Arbos–Talbot
1952	Italy	Giorgio Albani	Legnano
1953	Italy	Angelo Conterno	Fréjus
1954	Italy	Giorgio Albani	Legnano
1955	Italy	Fausto Coppi	Bianchi–Pirelli
1956	Italy	Cleto Maule	Torpado
1957	Italy	Aurelio Cestari	Atala
1958	Italy	Cleto Maule	Torpado
1959	Italy	Silvano Ciampi	Bianchi–Pirelli
1960	Belgium	Emile Daems	Philco
1961	Italy	Adriano Zamboni	Molteni
1962	Italy	Franco Balmamion	Carpano
1963	Italy	Italo Zilioli	Carpano
1964	Italy	Franco Cribiori	Gazzola
1965	Italy	Michele Dancelli	Molteni
1966	Italy	Michele Dancelli	Molteni
1967	Italy	Michele Dancelli	Vittadello
1968	Italy	Gianni Motta	Molteni
1969	Italy	Felice Gimondi	Salvarani
1970	Italy	Gianni Motta	Salvarani
1971	Sweden	Gösta Pettersson	Ferretti
1972	Italy	Felice Gimondi	Salvarani
1973	Italy	Italo Zilioli	Dreherforte
1974	Italy	Giovanni Battaglin	Jollj Ceramica
1975	Italy	Fabrizio Fabbri	Bianchi–Campagnolo
1976	Italy	Francesco Moser	Sanson
1977	Italy	Gianbattista Baronchelli	Scic
1978	Italy	Gianbattista Baronchelli	Scic
1979	Italy	Gianbattista Baronchelli	Magniflex–Famcucine
1980	Italy	Gianbattista Baronchelli	Bianchi–Piaggio
1981	Italy	Gianbattista Baronchelli	Bianchi–Piaggio
1982	Italy	Gianbattista Baronchelli	Bianchi–Piaggio
1983	Spain	Marino Lejarreta	Alfa Lum
1984	Italy	Mario Beccia	Malvor–Bottecchia
1985	Italy	Francesco Moser	Gis Gelati
1986	Italy	Gianni Bugno	Atala–Ofmega
1987	Italy	Gianni Bugno	Atala–Ofmega
1988	Italy	Gianni Bugno	Chateau d'Ax
1989	Italy	Moreno Argentin	Gewiss–Bianchi
1990	Italy	Flavio Giupponi	Carrera Jeans–Vagabond
1991	Belgium	Dirk De Wolf	Tonton Tapis–GB
1992	Italy	Claudio Chiappucci	Carrera Jeans–Vagabond
1993	Italy	Giuseppe Calcaterra	Amore & Vita–Galatron
1994	Russia	Evgeni Berzin	Gewiss–Ballan
1995	Italy	Francesco Casagrande	Mercatone Uno–Saeco
1996	Italy	Wladimir Belli	Panaria–Vinavil
1997	Russia	Pavel Tonkov	Mapei–GB
1998	Russia	Pavel Tonkov	Mapei–Bricobi
1999	Italy	Simone Borgheresi	Mercatone Uno–Bianchi
2000	Italy	Mauro Zanetti	Vini Caldirola–Sidermec
2001	Kazakhstan	Alexandre Shefer	Alessio
2002	Italy	Giuliano Figueras	Ceramiche Panaria–Fiordo
2003	Italy	Gilberto Simoni	Saeco
2004	Italy	Damiano Cunego	Saeco
2005	Italy	Gilberto Simoni	Lampre–Caffita
2006	Italy	Rinaldo Nocentini	Acqua & Sapone
2007	Italy	Alessandro Bertolini	Diquigiovanni–Selle Italia
2008	Italy	Alessandro Bertolini	Diquigiovanni–Androni
2009	Italy	Vincenzo Nibali	Liquigas
2010	Croatia	Robert Kišerlovski	Liquigas–Doimo
2011	Italy	Damiano Cunego	Lampre–ISD
2012	Italy	Fabio Felline	Androni Giocattoli–Venezuela
2013	Italy	Davide Mucelli	Ceramica Flaminia–Fondriest
2014	Italy	Sonny Colbrelli	Bardiani–CSF
2015	Spain	Omar Fraile	Caja Rural–Seguros RGA
2016	Russia	Sergey Firsanov	Gazprom–RusVelo
2017	Italy	Danilo Celano	Amore & Vita–Selle SMP
2018	Italy	Giulio Ciccone	Bardiani–CSF
2019	Italy	Mattia Cattaneo	Androni Giocattoli–Sidermec
2020	Great Britain	Ethan Hayter	INEOS Grenadiers
2021	Belgium	Ben Hermans	Israel Start-Up Nation
2022	South Africa	Louis Meintjes	Intermarché–Wanty–Gobert Matériaux
2023	Switzerland	Marc Hirschi	UAE Team Emirates
2024	Switzerland	Jan Christen	UAE Team Emirates
2025	Italy	Diego Ulissi	XDS Astana Team
2026	Italy	Ludovico Crescioli	Team Polti VisitMalta
