= 1957 Giro di Lombardia =

Race details
- Dates: October 20, 1957
- Stages: 1
- Distance: 240 km (149.1 mi)

Results
	Winner	Diego Ronchini (ITA)
	Second	Bruno Monti (ITA)
	Third	Aurelio Cestari (ITA)

The Giro di Lombardia 1957, the 51st edition of the race, was held on October 20, 1957.

== General classification ==
=== Final general classification ===
Rank	Rider	Team	Time
1	Diego Ronchini (ITA)	Bianchi	
2	Bruno Monti (ITA)	Atala-Pirelli	
3	Aurelio Cestari (ITA)	Atala-Pirelli	
4	André Vlayen (BEL)	Ghigi	
5	Raymond Impanis (BEL)	Peugeot	
6	André Darrigade (FRA)	Helyett	
7	Angelo Conterno (ITA)	Bianchi	
8	Cleto Maule (ITA)	Torpado	
9	Dino Bruni (ITA)	Bianchi	
10	Miguel Poblet (ESP)	Ignis	
