= Trofeo Matteotti =

Road cycling race in Pescara, Italy

Race details
- Date: Early-August
- Region: Pescara, Italy
- English name: Matteotti Trophy
- Local name: Trofeo Matteotti (in Italian)
- Discipline: Road
- Competition: UCI Europe Tour
- Type: Single-day
- Web site: www.trofeomatteotti.com

History
- First edition: 1945
- Editions: 78 (as of 2026)
- First winner: Mario Ricci (ITA)
- Most wins: Francesco Moser (ITA) (3 wins)
- Most recent: Sakarias Koller Løland (NOR)

Trofeo Matteotti is a single-day road bicycle race held annually in Pescara, Italy. Since 2005, the race has been organised as a 1.1 event on the UCI Europe Tour.

== Winners ==
Year	Country	Rider	Team
1945	Italy	Mario Ricci	Legnano
1946	Italy	Gino Bartali	Legnano-Pirelli
1947	Italy	Virgilio Salimbeni	individual
1948	Italy	Spartaco Rosati	individual
1949	Italy	Giuseppe Minardi	individual
1950	Italy	Dante Rivola	Viscontea-Ursus
1951	Italy	Elio Brascola	individual
1953	Italy	Giuseppe Doni	Torpado–Ursus
1954	Italy	Giuliano Michelon	Fiorelli
1955	Italy	Giuseppe Minardi	Legnano
1956	Italy	Bruno Tognaccini	Leo–Chlorodont
1957	Italy	Silvano Ciampi	Faema–Guerra
1958	Italy	Ercole Baldini	Legnano
1959	Italy	Adriano Zamboni	Torpado–Clement
1960	Italy	Oreste Magni	Ignis
1961	Italy	Angelo Conterno	Baratti-Milano
1962	Italy	Pierino Baffi	Ghigi
1963	Italy	Pierino Baffi	Molteni
1964	Italy	Guido De Rosso	Molteni
1965	Italy	Guido De Rosso	Molteni
1966	Italy	Vito Taccone	Vittadello
1967	Italy	Dino Zandegù	Salvarani
1968	Denmark	Ole Ritter	Germanvox-Wega
1969	Italy	Marino Basso	Molteni
1970	Italy	Felice Gimondi	Salvarani
1971	Italy	Wilmo Francioni	Ferretti
1972	Italy	Davide Boifava	Zonca
1973	Belgium	Roger De Vlaeminck	Brooklyn
1974	Italy	Franco Bitossi	Scic
1975	Italy	Francesco Moser	Filotex
1976	Italy	Francesco Moser	Sanson
1977	Italy	Wilmo Francioni	Magniflex–Torpado
1978	Italy	Francesco Moser	Sanson
1979	Italy	Giovanni Battaglin	Inoxpran
1980	Italy	Silvano Contini	Bianchi–Piaggio
1981	Sweden	Alf Segersäll	Bianchi–Piaggio
1982	Italy	Moreno Argentin	Sammontana–Benotto
1983	Italy	Marino Amadori	Gis Gelati-Campagnolo
1984	Australia	Michael Wilson	Alfa Lum
1985	Italy	Pierino Gavazzi	Atala
1986	Denmark	Jørgen Marcussen	Murella-Fanini
1987	Italy	Massimo Ghirotto	Carrera Jeans–Vagabond
1988	Italy	Ennio Salvador	Gewiss–Bianchi
1989	Italy	Roberto Pelliconi	Polli-Mobiexport
1990	Italy	Mario Chiesa	Carrera Jeans–Vagabond
1991	Switzerland	Daniel Steiger	Jolly Componibili-Club 88
1992	Switzerland	Beat Zberg	Helvetia
1993	Italy	Alberto Elli	Ariostea
1994	Denmark	Rolf Sørensen	GB–MG Maglificio
1995	Italy	Gianni Bugno	MG Maglificio–Technogym
1996	Italy	Andrea Ferrigato	Roslotto–ZG Mobili
1997	Belgium	Frank Vandenbroucke	Mapei–GB
1998	Italy	Francesco Casagrande	Cofidis
1999	Italy	Francesco Casagrande	Vini Caldirola
2000	Belarus	Yauheni Seniushkin	Ceramica Panaria–Gaerne
2001	Italy	Gianni Faresin	Liquigas–Pata
2002	Italy	Salvatore Commesso	Saeco–Longoni Sport
2003	Italy	Filippo Pozzato	Fassa Bortolo
2004	Italy	Danilo Di Luca	Saeco
2005	Italy	Ruggero Marzoli	Acqua & Sapone–Adria Mobil
2006	Ukraine	Ruslan Pidgornyy	Tenax–Salmilano
2007	Italy	Filippo Pozzato	Liquigas
2008	Italy	Paolo Bettini	Quick-Step
2009	No race		
2010	Italy	Riccardo Chiarini	De Rosa–Stac Plastic
2011	Italy	Oscar Gatto	Farnese Vini–Neri Sottoli
2012	Italy	Pierpaolo De Negri	Farnese Vini–Selle Italia
2013	Switzerland	Sébastien Reichenbach	IAM Cycling
2014	No race		
2015	Russia	Evgeny Shalunov	Lokosphinx
2016	Italy	Vincenzo Albanese	Italian national team
2017	Russia	Sergey Shilov	Lokosphinx
2018	Italy	Davide Ballerini	Androni Giocattoli–Sidermec
2019	Italy	Matteo Trentin	Italian national team
2020	Italy	Valerio Conti	UAE Team Emirates
2021	Italy	Matteo Trentin	UAE Team Emirates
2022	No race		
2023	Netherlands	Sjoerd Bax	UAE Team Emirates
2024	Venezuela	Orluis Aular	Caja Rural–Seguros RGA
2025	Mexico	Isaac del Toro	UAE Team Emirates XRG
2026	Norway	Sakarias Koller Løland	Uno-X Mobility
