= 1963 Giro d'Italia =

Race details
- Dates: 19 May - 9 June 1963
- Stages: 21
- Distance: 4,063 km (2,525 mi)
- Winning time: 116h 50' 16"

Results
Jersey awarded to the overall winner	Winner	Franco Balmamion (ITA)	(Carpano)
	Second	Vittorio Adorni (ITA)	(Cynar)
	Third	Giorgio Zancanaro (ITA)	(San Pellegrino)
	Mountains	Vito Taccone (ITA)	(Lygie)
	Team	Carpano	

The 1963 Giro d'Italia was the 46th running of the Giro d'Italia, one of cycling's Grand Tour races. The Giro started in Naples, on 19 May, with a 182 km (113.1 mi) stage and concluded back in Milan, on 9 June, with a 136 km (84.5 mi) leg. A total of 120 riders from 12 teams entered the 21-stage race, which was won by Italian Franco Balmamion of the Carpano team. The second and third places were taken by Italian riders Vittorio Adorni and Giorgio Zancanaro, respectively.

== Teams ==
Twelve teams were invited by the race organizers to participate in the 1963 edition of the Giro d'Italia. Each team sent a squad of ten riders, which meant that the race started with a peloton of 120 cyclists. From the riders that began the race, 86 made it to the finish in Milan.

The teams entering the race were:

- Carpano
- Cite
- Cynar–Frejus
- Gazzola
- G.B.C.–Gramaglia
- IBAC
- Legnano
- Lygie
- Molteni
- Salvarani
- San Pellegrino–Firte
- Springoil–Fuchs

Most of the riders were Italian riders. The exceptions were 8 riders from Belgium, 3 from Switzerland, 2 from Spain and 2 from the Netherlands.

== Route and stages ==
The race route was revealed to the public on 25 March 1963 by race director Vincenzo Torriani.

Stage results
Stage	Date	Course	Distance	Type	Winner
1	19 May	Naples to Potenza	182 km (113 mi)	Plain stage	Vittorio Adorni (ITA)
2	20 May	Potenza to Bari	185 km (115 mi)	Plain stage	Pierino Baffi (ITA)
3	21 May	Bari to Campobasso	252 km (157 mi)	Plain stage	Jaime Alomar (ESP)
4	22 May	Campobasso to Pescara	213 km (132 mi)	Stage with mountain(s)	Guido Carlesi (ITA)
5	23 May	Pescara to Viterbo	263 km (163 mi)	Plain stage	Vendramino Bariviera (ITA)
6	24 May	Bolsena to Arezzo	192 km (119 mi)	Plain stage	Vendramino Bariviera (ITA)
7	25 May	Arezzo to Riolo Terme	173 km (107 mi)	Stage with mountain(s)	Nino Defilippis (ITA)
8	26 May	Riolo Terme to Salsomaggiore Terme	203 km (126 mi)	Plain stage	Adriano Durante (ITA)
9	27 May	Salsomaggiore Terme to La Spezia	173 km (107 mi)	Stage with mountain(s)	Giorgio Zancanaro (ITA)
10	28 May	La Spezia to Asti	225 km (140 mi)	Plain stage	Vito Taccone (ITA)
11	29 May	Asti to Santuario di Oropa	130 km (81 mi)	Stage with mountain(s)	Vito Taccone (ITA)
12	30 May	Biella to Leukerbad (Switzerland)	214 km (133 mi)	Stage with mountain(s)	Vito Taccone (ITA)
13	31 May	Leukerbad (Switzerland) to Saint-Vincent	152 km (94 mi)	Stage with mountain(s)	Vito Taccone (ITA)
14	1 June	Saint-Vincent to Cremona	260 km (162 mi)	Plain stage	Marino Vigna (ITA)
15	2 June	Mantua to Treviso	155 km (96 mi)	Plain stage	Franco Magnani (ITA)
	3 June	Rest day			
16	4 June	Treviso to Treviso	56 km (35 mi)	Individual time trial	Vittorio Adorni (ITA)
17	5 June	Treviso to Gorizia	213 km (132 mi)	Plain stage	Vendramino Bariviera (ITA)
18	6 June	Gorizia to Belluno Nevegal	248 km (154 mi)	Stage with mountain(s)	Arnaldo Pambianco (ITA)
19	7 June	Belluno to Moena	198 km (123 mi)	Stage with mountain(s)	Vito Taccone (ITA)
20	8 June	Moena to Lumezzane	240 km (149 mi)	Plain stage	Guido Carlesi (ITA)
21	9 June	Brescia to Milan	136 km (85 mi)	Plain stage	Antonio Bailetti (ITA)
	Total		4,063 km (2,525 mi)		

== Race events ==
Shortly before the Giro, the Italian National Road Race Championships were held. In 1963, this was not a one-day-race, but held over several stages. In the second stage, Marino Fontana had a flat tire, and was then assisted by a rider from a different team, which was against the rules. The union of Italian professional cyclists (organizers of the event) did not see this as a problem, but the Italian cycling union decided to disqualify Fontana. The organization ignored the union, and allowed Fontana to ride the third stage. Fontana gained enough points to win the championship, and was given the national jersey to wear. At the start of the Giro, Fontana wore this national jersey. The Giro was organized by the Italian cycling union, and they forbade him to wear this jersey because they did not see him as national champion. Fontana came to the start of the second stage again wearing this jersey, and the jury told him that he should take it off or else he would not be allowed to start. Fontana did not change this jersey, and the jury collectively quit. Without a jury, the race could not start, so the start of the second stage was delayed until a new jury could be found. The GBC team, made out of Belgian and Dutch riders, then abandoned the race. They gave the reason that the race no longer appeared to be sanctioned by the Italian cycling union, and so it could be seen as an illegal race, and the Belgian and Dutch cycling unions could suspend them. After this, the Italian National Olympic Committee took responsibility for the rest of the race.

== Classification leadership ==
One leader's jersey was worn during the 1963 Giro d'Italia. The leader of the general classification – calculated by adding the stage finish times of each rider – wore a pink jersey. This classification is the most important of the race, and its winner is considered as the winner of the Giro. There were no time bonuses in 1963.

A major secondary classification was the mountains classification. In this ranking, points were won by reaching the summit of a climb ahead of other cyclists. There were three categories of mountains. The first category awarded 50, 40, 30, 20, and 10 points, the second distributed 40, 30, 20, and 10 points, and the third category gave 30, 20, and 10 points.

There were also intermediate sprints, called "traguardi tricolori", and this year there was a classification related to these. The first five riders at each intermediate sprint scored points.

Although no jersey was awarded, there was also one classification for the teams, in which the teams were awarded points for their rider's performance during the stages. This classification was named the "Ramazzotti" classification, and points were given for high positions in stages, intermediate sprints and mountain tops, and leading the general classification.

Classification leadership by stage
Stage	Winner	General classification	Mountains classification	Team classification
1	Vittorio Adorni	Vittorio Adorni	not awarded	GBC
2	Pierino Baffi	Vittorio Adorni	not awarded	Cynar
3	Jaime Alomar	Vittorio Adorni	not awarded	Carpano
4	Guido Carlesi	Diego Ronchini	Vito Taccone	Molteni
5	Vendramino Bariviera	Diego Ronchini	Vito Taccone	Carpano
6	Vendramino Bariviera	Diego Ronchini	Vito Taccone	Carpano
7	Nino Defilippis	Diego Ronchini	Vito Taccone	Carpano
8	Adriano Durante	Diego Ronchini	Vito Taccone	Carpano
9	Giorgio Zancanaro	Diego Ronchini	Giorgio Zancanaro	Carpano
10	Vito Taccone	Diego Ronchini	Giorgio Zancanaro	Carpano
11	Vito Taccone	Diego Ronchini	Giorgio Zancanaro	Carpano
12	Vito Taccone	Franco Balmamion	Vito Taccone	Carpano
13	Vito Taccone	Franco Balmamion	Vito Taccone	Carpano
14	Marino Vigna	Franco Balmamion	Vito Taccone	Carpano
15	Franco Magnani	Franco Balmamion	Vito Taccone	Carpano
16	Vittorio Adorni	Diego Ronchini	Vito Taccone	Carpano
17	Vendramino Bariviera	Diego Ronchini	Vito Taccone	Carpano
18	Arnaldo Pambianco	Vittorio Adorni	Vito Taccone	Carpano
19	Vito Taccone	Franco Balmamion	Vito Taccone	Carpano
20	Guido Carlesi	Franco Balmamion	Vito Taccone	Carpano
21	Antonio Bailetti	Franco Balmamion	Vito Taccone	Carpano
Final		Franco Balmamion	Vito Taccone	Carpano

== Final standings ==
Legend
Pink jersey	Denotes the winner of the General classification

=== General classification ===
Final general classification (1–10)
Rank	Name	Team	Time
1	Franco Balmamion (ITA)	Carpano	116h 50' 16"
2	Vittorio Adorni (ITA)	Cynar	+ 2' 24"
3	Giorgio Zancanaro (ITA)	San Pellegrino	+ 3' 15"
4	Guido De Rosso (ITA)	Molteni	+ 6' 34"
5	Diego Ronchini (ITA)	Salvarani	+ 10' 11"
6	Vito Taccone (ITA)	Lygie	+ 11' 50"
7	Imerio Massignan (ITA)	Legnano	+ 16' 52"
8	Guido Carlesi (ITA)	Molteni	+ 17' 08"
9	Graziano Battistini (ITA)	IBAC	+ 23' 38"
10	Carlo Brugnami (ITA)	Gazzola	+ 25' 36"

=== Mountains classification ===
Final mountains classification (1–9)
	Name	Team	Points
1	Vito Taccone (ITA)	Lygie	420
2	Giorgio Zancanaro (ITA)	San Pellegrino	120
3	Franco Bitossi (ITA)	Springoil	100
4	Enzo Moser (ITA)	San Pellegrino	80
5	Vittorio Adorni (ITA)	Cynar	60
6	Franco Balmamion (ITA)	Carpano	50
7	Giancarlo Ceppi (ITA)	Springoil	40
7	Imerio Massignan (ITA)	Legnano	40
9	Arnaldo Pambianco (ITA)	Salvarani	30
9	Italo Zilioli (ITA)	Carpano	30

=== Traguardi tricolori classification ===
Final traguardi tricolori classification (1–10)
	Name	Team	Points
1	Vito Taccone (ITA)	Lygie	99
2	Franco Bitossi (ITA)	Springoil	85
3	Raffaele Marcoli (ITA)	Legnano	51
4	Marino Fontana (ITA)	San Pellegrino	50
5	Vittorio Adorni (ITA)	Cynar	42
6	Antonio Bailetti (ITA)	Carpano	35
7	Giorgio Zancanaro (ITA)	San Pellegrino	30
8	Antonio Franchi (ITA)	Lygie	29
9	Gilberto Vendemiati (ITA)	Gazzola	27
10	Germano Barale (ITA)	Carpano	25

=== Team classification ===
Final team classification (1–10)
	Team	Points
1	Carpano	4,098
2	Lygie	3,167
3	Cynar	2,827
4	San Pellegrino	2,762
5	Molteni	2,333
6	Springoil	2,248
7	Salvarani	2,134
8	IBAC	1,878
9	Gazzola	1,860
10	Legnano	1,683
