= 1961 Giro d'Italia =

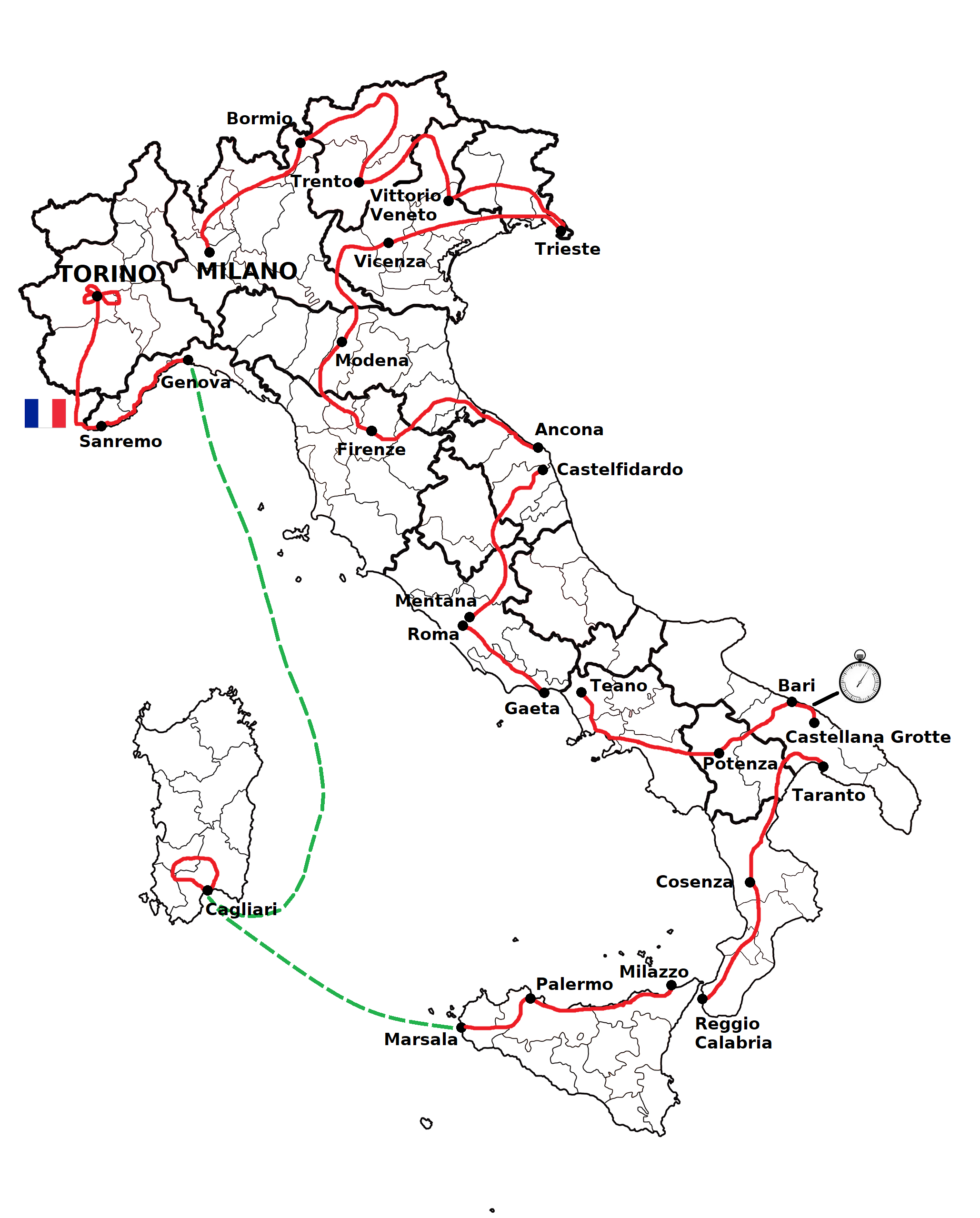
- The race route for the 1961 Giro d'Italia

Race details
- Dates: 20 May - 11 June 1961
- Stages: 21
- Distance: 4,001 km (2,486 mi)
- Winning time: 111h 25' 28"

Results
Jersey awarded to the overall winner	Winner	Arnaldo Pambianco (ITA)	(Fides)
	Second	Jacques Anquetil (FRA)	(Helyett–Fynsec–Hutchinson)
	Third	Antonio Suárez (ESP)	(EMI)
	Mountains	Vito Taccone (ITA)	(Atala)
	Team	Faema	

The 1961 Giro d'Italia was the 44th running of the Giro d'Italia, one of cycling's Grand Tour races. The Giro started in Turin, on 20 May, with a 115 km (71.5 mi) stage and concluded in Milan, on 11 June, with a 214 km (133.0 mi) leg. A total of 170 riders from 17 teams entered the 21-stage race, which was won by Italian Arnaldo Pambianco of the Fides team. The second and third places were taken by Frenchman Jacques Anquetil and Spaniard Antonio Suárez, respectively.

== Teams ==
A total of 17 teams were invited to participate in the 1961 Giro d'Italia. Each team sent a squad of ten riders, so the Giro began with a peloton of 170 cyclists. Out of the 170 riders that started this edition of the Giro d'Italia, a total of 92 riders made it to the finish in Milan. Legnano initially threatened to not participate in the Giro.

The 17 teams that took part in the race were:

- Atala
- Baratti
- Bianchi
- Carpano
- EMI
- Faema
- Fides
- Helyett–Fynsec–Hutchinson
- Gazzola–Fiorelli
- Ghigi
- Ignis
- Legnano
- Molteni
- Philco
- San Pelligrino
- Torpado
- VOV

== Pre-race favorites ==
There was initial belief that Charly Gaul would not race the Giro.

== Route and stages ==
The route was revealed on 22 April 1961.

The fourth stage on Sardinia was the first time in Giro history that this Island was visited.

Stage characteristics and winners
Stage	Date	Course	Distance	Type	Winner
1	20 May	Turin to Turin	115 km (71 mi)	Plain stage	Miguel Poblet (ESP)
2	21 May	Turin to Sanremo	185 km (115 mi)	Stage with mountain(s)	Miguel Poblet (ESP)
3	22 May	Sanremo to Genoa	149 km (93 mi)	Plain stage	Willy Schroeders (BEL)
4	23 May	Cagliari to Cagliari	118 km (73 mi)	Plain stage	Oreste Magni (ITA)
5	24 May	Marsala to Palermo	144 km (89 mi)	Stage with mountain(s)	Louis Proost (BEL)
	25 May	Rest day			
6	26 May	Palermo to Milazzo	224 km (139 mi)	Plain stage	Nino Defilippis (ITA)
7	27 May	Reggio Calabria to Cosenza	221 km (137 mi)	Stage with mountain(s)	Antonio Suárez (ESP)
8	28 May	Cosenza to Taranto	237 km (147 mi)	Plain stage	Piet van Est (NED)
9	29 May	Castellana Grotte to Bari	53 km (33 mi)	Individual time trial	Jacques Anquetil (FRA)
10	30 May	Bari to Potenza	140 km (87 mi)	Stage with mountain(s)	Vito Taccone (ITA)
11	31 May	Potenza to Teano	252 km (157 mi)	Stage with mountain(s)	Pietro Chiodini (ITA)
12	1 June	Gaeta to Rome	149 km (93 mi)	Plain stage	Renato Giusti (ITA)
13	2 June	Mentana to Castelfidardo	279 km (173 mi)	Stage with mountain(s)	Rik Van Looy (BEL)
14	3 June	Ancona to Florence	250 km (155 mi)	Stage with mountain(s)	Silvano Ciampi (ITA)
15	4 June	Florence to Modena	178 km (111 mi)	Stage with mountain(s)	Rik Van Looy (BEL)
16	5 June	Modena to Vicenza	207 km (129 mi)	Plain stage	Adriano Zamboni (ITA)
17	6 June	Vicenza to Trieste	204 km (127 mi)	Plain stage	Rik Van Looy (BEL)
	7 June	Rest day			
18	8 June	Trieste to Vittorio Veneto	161 km (100 mi)	Plain stage	Renato Giusti (ITA)
19	9 June	Vittorio Veneto to Trento	249 km (155 mi)	Stage with mountain(s)	Willy Schroeders (BEL)
20	10 June	Trento to Bormio	275 km (171 mi)	Stage with mountain(s)	Charly Gaul (LUX)
21	11 June	Bormio to Milan	214 km (133 mi)	Plain stage	Miguel Poblet (ESP)
	Total		4,004 km (2,488 mi)		

== Classification leadership ==
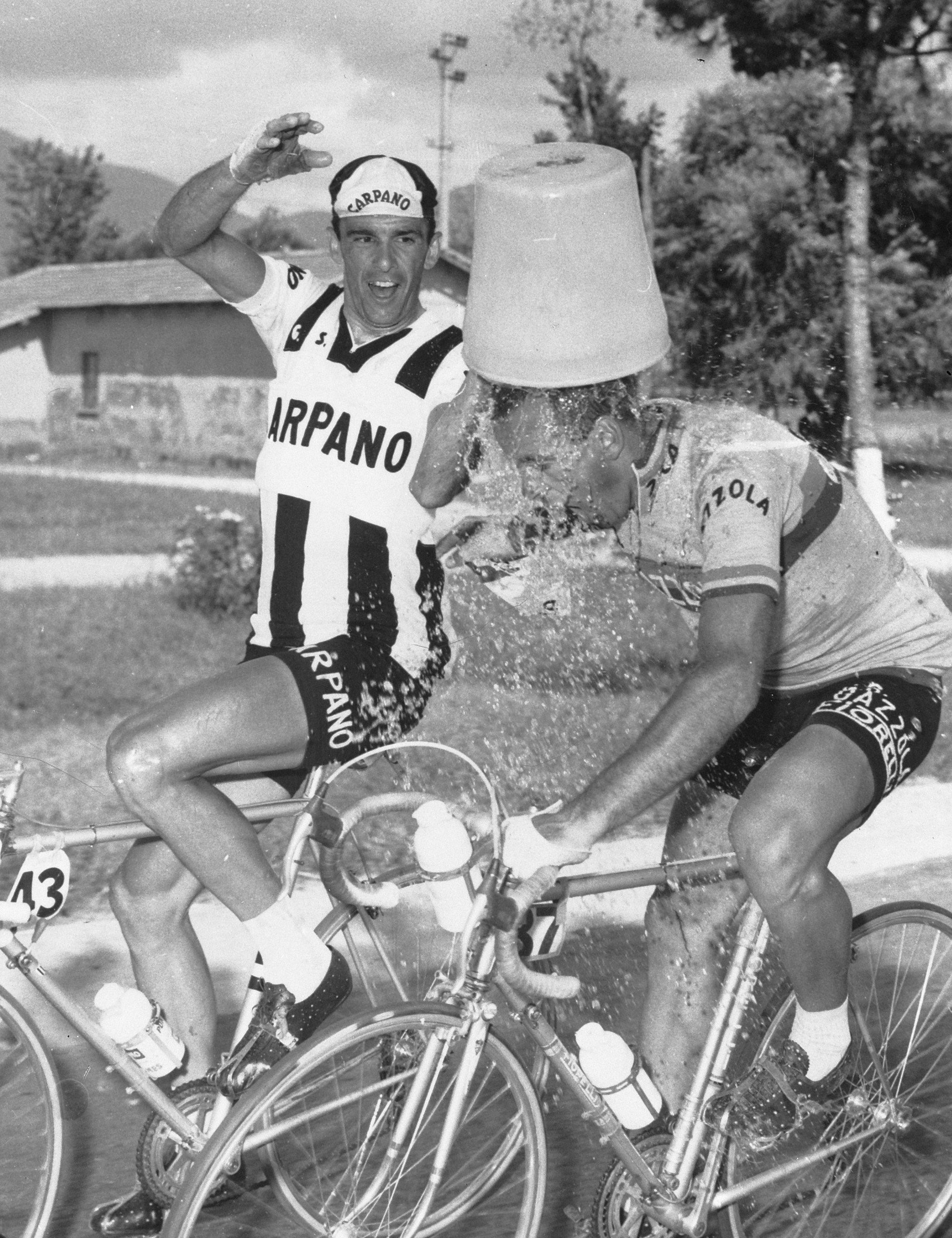
Armando di Maria (left, Carpano) helping Gianni Ferlenghi (right, Gazzola–Fiorelli) dump a bucket of water on his head during the sixteenth stage of the race.

One leader's jersey was worn during the 1961 Giro d'Italia: the leader of the general classification – calculated by adding the stage finish times of each rider – wore a pink jersey. This classification is the most important of the race, and its winner is considered as the winner of the Giro. There were no time bonuses in 1961.

A major secondary classification was the mountains classification. In this ranking, points were won by reaching the summit of a climb ahead of other cyclists. There were three categories of mountains. The first category awarded 50, 40, 30, 20, and 10 points, the second distributed 40, 30, 20, and 10 points, and the third category gave 30, 20, and 10 points.

Although no jersey was awarded, there was also one classification for the teams, in which the teams were awarded points for their rider's performance during the stages. This classification was named the "Ramazzotti" classification, and points were given for high positions in stages, intermediate sprints and mountain tops, and leading the general classification.

To honor the 100th birthday of Italy, the intermediate sprints were called "traguardi tricolori", named after the flag of Italy. There was no classification calculated from these sprints in 1961, but they were used in the calculation of the team classification.

Classification leadership by stage
Stage	Winner	General classification	Mountains classification	Team classification
1	Miguel Poblet	Miguel Poblet	not awarded	Ignis
2	Miguel Poblet	Miguel Poblet	Angelo Conterno	Ignis
3	Willy Schroeders	Miguel Poblet	Angelo Conterno	Faema
4	Oreste Magni	Miguel Poblet	Angelo Conterno	Faema
5	Louis Proost	Miguel Poblet	Angelo Conterno	Faema
6	Nino Defilippis	Miguel Poblet	Angelo Conterno	Faema
7	Antonio Suárez	Antonio Suárez	Angelo Conterno & Edouard Delberghe	Faema
8	Piet van Est	Guillaume Van Tongerloo	Angelo Conterno & Edouard Delberghe	Faema
9	Jacques Anquetil	Guillaume Van Tongerloo	Angelo Conterno & Edouard Delberghe	Faema
10	Vito Taccone	Jacques Anquetil	Angelo Conterno & Edouard Delberghe	Faema
11	Pietro Chiodini	Jacques Anquetil	Vito Taccone & Federico Bahamontes	Faema
12	Renato Giusti	Jacques Anquetil	Vito Taccone & Federico Bahamontes	Faema
13	Rik Van Looy	Jacques Anquetil	Vito Taccone & Federico Bahamontes	Faema
14	Silvano Ciampi	Arnaldo Pambianco	Vito Taccone	Faema
15	Rik Van Looy	Arnaldo Pambianco	Vito Taccone	Faema
16	Adriano Zamboni	Arnaldo Pambianco	Vito Taccone	Faema
17	Rik Van Looy	Arnaldo Pambianco	Vito Taccone	Faema
18	Renato Giusti	Arnaldo Pambianco	Vito Taccone	Faema
19	Willy Schroeders	Arnaldo Pambianco	Vito Taccone	Faema
20	Charly Gaul	Arnaldo Pambianco	Vito Taccone	Faema
21	Miguel Poblet	Arnaldo Pambianco	Vito Taccone	Faema
Final		Arnaldo Pambianco	Vito Taccone	Faema

== Final standings ==
Legend
Pink jersey	Denotes the winner of the General classification

=== General classification ===
Final general classification (1–10)
Rank	Name	Team	Time
1	Arnaldo Pambianco (ITA)	Fides	111h 25' 28"
2	Jacques Anquetil (FRA)	Helyett–Fynsec–Hutchinson	+ 3' 45"
3	Antonio Suárez (ESP)	EMI	+ 4' 17"
4	Charly Gaul (LUX)	Gazzola–Fiorelli	+ 4' 22"
5	Guido Carlesi (ITA)	Philco	+ 8' 08"
6	Hans Junkermann (GER)	Gazzola–Fiorelli	+ 12' 25"
7	Rik Van Looy (BEL)	Faema	+ 12' 38"
8	Guillaume Van Tongerloo (BEL)	Faema	+ 14' 18"
9	Carlo Brugnami (ITA)	Torpado	+ 16' 05"
10	Nino Defilippis (ITA)	Carpano	+ 16' 23"

=== Mountains classification ===
Final mountains classification (1–10)
Rank	Name	Team	Points
1	Vito Taccone (ITA)	Atala	270
2	Gabriel Mas (ESP)	EMI	130
3	Imerio Massignan (ITA)	Legnano	120
4	Hans Junkermann (GER)	Gazzola–Fiorelli	70
4	Jesús Galdeano (ESP)	EMI	70
4	Angelo Conterno (ITA)	Baratti	70
7	Guido Carlesi (ITA)	Philco	50
7	Rik Van Looy (BEL)	Faema	50
7	Charly Gaul (LUX)	Gazzola–Fiorelli	50
10	Edouard Delberghe (FRA)	Helyett–Fynsec–Hutchinson	40
10	Arnaldo Pambianco (ITA)	Fides	40

=== Team classification ===
Final team classification (1–10)
Rank	Team	Points
1	Faema	4959
2	Torpado	1964
3	Ignis	1787
4	EMI	1591
5	Molteni	1326
6	Bianchi	1137
7	Baratti	1010
8	Helyett–Fynsec–Hutchinson	950
9	Fides	849
10	Atala	838
