= Fides (cycling team) =

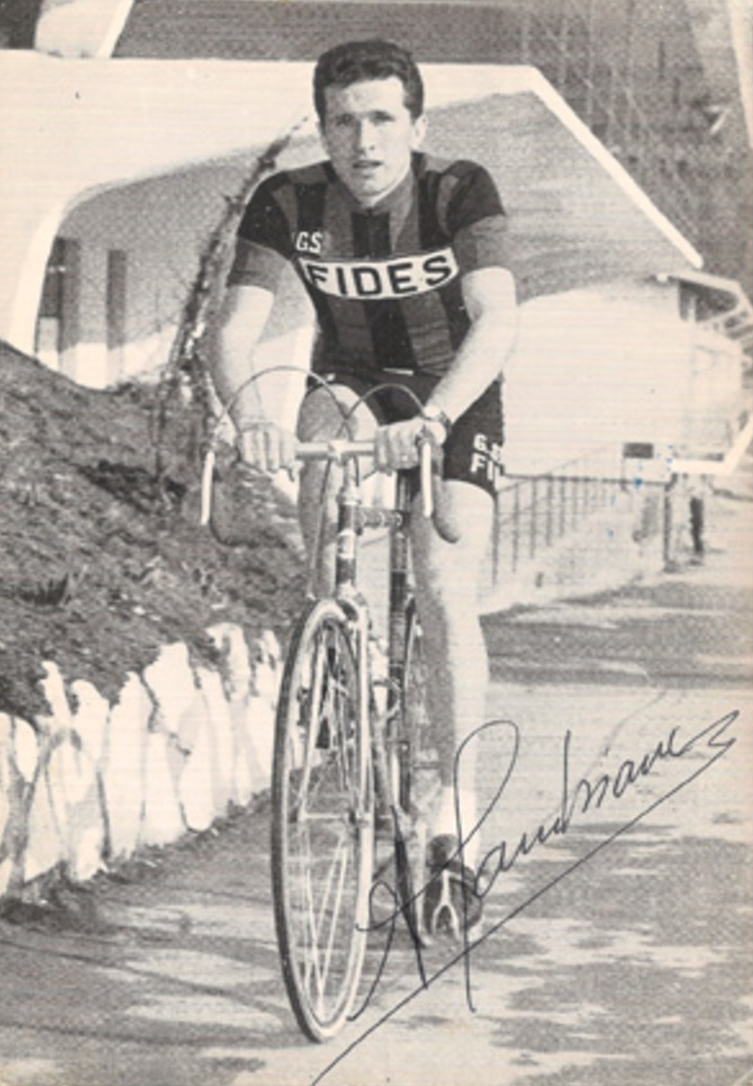
- Arnaldo Pambianco in 1961

Team information
- Registered: Italy
- Founded: 1961
- Discipline: Road

Key personnel
- General manager: Faliero Masi

Team name history
- 1961: Fides

Fides was an Italian professional cycling team that existed in 1961. Arnaldo Pambianco won the general classification of the 1961 Giro d'Italia with the team.

== Team roster ==
The following is a list of riders on the Fides squad during the 1961 season, with age given for 1 January 1961.

Rider	Date of birth
Ariani Pier Luigi (ITA)	8 February 1935 (aged 25)
Alberto Assirelli (ITA)	31 August 1936 (aged 24)
Pierino Baffi (ITA)	15 September 1930 (aged 30)
Waldemaro Bartolozzi (ITA)	16 October 1927 (aged 33)
Idrio Bui (ITA)	14 June 1932 (aged 28)
Mino De Rossi (ITA)	21 May 1931 (aged 29)
Leandro Faggin (ITA)	18 July 1933 (aged 27)
Giancarlo Gentina (ITA)	2 January 1939 (aged 21)

Rider	Date of birth
Sante Lombardi (ITA)	11 December 1933 (aged 27)
Oreste Magni (ITA)	3 March 1936 (aged 24)
Augusto Marcaletti (ITA)	2 August 1934 (aged 26)
Marino Morettini (ITA)	2 January 1931 (aged 29)
Arnaldo Pambianco (ITA)	16 August 1935 (aged 25)
Virginio Pizzali (ITA)	23 December 1934 (aged 26)
Luigi Zaimbro (ITA)	21 June 1936 (aged 24)
