= Bariviera =

Bariviera is an Italian surname. Notable people with the surname include:

- Renzo Bariviera (born 1949), Italian basketball player
- Vendramino Bariviera (1937–2001), Italian racing cyclist, brother of Renzo
