= Giorgio Zancanaro (cyclist) =

Italian cyclist

Personal information
- Born: 15 April 1940 (age 86) San Michele, Alessandria, Italy

Cycling career
- Sport: Cycling
- Current team: Retired
- Discipline: Road
- Role: Rider

Professional teams
- 1961–1962: Philco
- 1963: San Pellegrino/Firte
- 1964: Carpano
- 1965: Maino
- 1966: Anpi Valenza Po
- 1967–1968: Max Meyer

Giorgio Zancanaro (born 15 April 1940 in San Michele, Alessandria) is an Italian former cyclist.

== Major results ==
1961
1st Stage 6 Tour de l'Avenir
2nd Giro dell'Emilia
1963
3rd Overall Giro d'Italia

1st Stage 9

1964
1st Giro di Toscana
1st Stage 13 Giro d'Italia
1967
1st Stage 1 Giro d'Italia
2nd Tre Valli Varesine
