= Silvano Ciampi =

Italian cyclist (1932–2022)

Personal information
- Full name: Silvano Ciampi
- Born: 22 February 1932 Maresca, Tuscany, Italy
- Died: 22 April 2022 (aged 90) Pistoia, Tuscany, Italy

Cycling career
- Sport: Cycling
- Discipline: Road
- Role: Rider

Professional teams
- 1957–1958: Faema–Guerra
- 1959: Bianchi–Pirelli
- 1960–1962: Philco
- 1963: Independent
- 1964–1965: Springoil–Fuchs

Major wins
- Grand Tours Giro d'Italia 2 individual stages (1958, 1961) One day races and Classics Gran Piemonte (1957, 1959) Trofeo Matteotti (1957)

Silvano Ciampi (22 February 1932 – 22 April 2022) was an Italian racing cyclist. He won stage 6 of the 1958 Giro d'Italia.

Ciampi died in Pistoia on 22 April 2022, at the age of 90.

== Major results ==
1952
1st Firenze - Mare
1956
1st Firenze - Mare
1st Gp Industria del Cuoio
1st Coppa Lanciotto Ballerini
1957
1st Gran Piemonte
1st Gran Premio Industria e Commercio di Prato
1st Trofeo Matteotti
2nd Coppa Bernocchi
5th Coppa Sabatini
1958
1st Stage 6 Giro d'Italia
3rd Giro della Provincia di reggio Calabria
7th Giro di Toscana
1959
1st Gran Piemonte
1st Giro di Romagna
1st Giro dell'Appennino
2nd Trofeo Matteotti
8th Giro dell'Emilia
9th Milano-Vignola
1960
9th Giro di Lombardia
1961
1st Stage 14 Giro d'Italia
4th Milano-Vignola
5th Overall Roma–Napoli–Roma

1st Stages 3 & 6a

6th Overall Tre Giorni del Sud
6th Giro di Romagna
7th Gran Piemonte
10th Tre Valli Varesine
1962
1st Giro di Campania
5th Trofeo Matteotti
1963
2nd Giro dell'Emilia
3rd Giro del Lazio
5th Tre Valli Varesine
8th Giro dell'Appennino
1964
9th Trofeo Laigueglia
1985
3rd GP la Torre

=== Grand Tour general classification results timeline ===
Grand Tour	1957	1958	1959	1960	1961	1962	1963	1964
Vuelta a España	Did not Compete							
Giro d'Italia	DNF	DNF	80	DNF	DNF	—	50	54
Tour de France	Did not Compete							

Legend
—	Did not compete
DNF	Did not finish
