= 1955 Giro di Lombardia =

Race details
- Dates: October 23, 1955
- Stages: 1
- Distance: 222 km (137.9 mi)

Results
	Winner	Cleto Maule (ITA)
	Second	Fred De Bruyne (BEL)
	Third	Angelo Conterno (ITA)

The 1955 Giro di Lombardia, 49th edition of the race, was held on October 23, 1955, in Milan, Italy with a total distance of 222 km (~137.9 miles).

116 cyclists started from Milan, 91 of them had completed the race.

== General classification ==
=== Final general classification ===
Rank	Rider	Team	Time
1	Cleto Maule (ITA)	Torpado	
2	Fred De Bruyne (BEL)	Mercier–Hutchinson	
3	Angelo Conterno (ITA)	Torpado	
4	Antonio Uliana (ITA)	Leo–Chlorodont	
5	René Privat (FRA)	Mercier–Hutchinson	
6	Franco Aureggi (ITA)	Legnano	
7	Remo Bartalini (ITA)	Fréjus	
8	Danilo Barozzi (ITA)	Atala	
9	Walter Serena (ITA)	Leo–Chlorodont	
10	Marcel Janssens (BEL)	Elvé–Peugeot	
