= Giro del Ticino =

Race details
- Region: Ticino, Switzerland
- Discipline: Road
- Type: One-day race

History
- First edition: 1949
- Editions: 20
- Final edition: 1968
- First winner: Charles Guyot (SUI)
- Most wins: Ferdinand Kübler (SUI) (4 wins)
- Final winner: Alberto Della Torre (ITA)

The Giro del Ticino was a professional one-day road cycling race held annually from 1949 to 1968 in the Canton of Ticino, Switzerland.

== Winners ==
Year	Winner	Second	Third
1949	(Switzerland) Charles Guyot	(Switzerland) Gottfried Weilenmann	(Italy) Enzo Nannini
1950	(Switzerland) Ferdi Kübler	(Italy) Umberto Drei	(Italy) Angelo Fumagalli
1951	(Switzerland) Ferdi Kübler	(Italy) Ettore Milano	(Italy) Vincenzo Rossello
1952	(Switzerland) Ferdi Kübler	(Italy) Giancarlo Astrua	(Italy) Arigo Padovan
1953	(Italy) Donato Zampini	(Italy) Bruno Monti	(Switzerland) Marcel Huber
1954	(Switzerland) Ferdi Kübler	(Switzerland) Eugen Kamber	(Italy) Nello Sforacchi
1955	(Switzerland) Hugo Koblet	(Italy) Arigo Padovan	(Italy) Roberto Falaschi
1956	(Italy) Valerio Chiarlone	(Italy) Gino Guerrini	(Italy) Giuseppe Cainero
1957	(Italy) Alfredo Sabbadin	(Italy) Germano Barale	(Belgium) Jan Adriaensens
1958	(Belgium) Jan Adriaensens	(Italy) Aldo Moser	(Italy) Fernando Brandolini
1959	(Italy) Angelo Conterno	(Italy) Alfredo Sabbadin	(Italy) Giuliano Natucci
1960	(Italy) Guglielmo Garello	(Austria) Wilfried Thaler	(Italy) Giovanni Pettinati
1961	(Belgium) Emile Daems	(Italy) Angelo Conterno	(Switzerland) Alfred Rüegg
1962	(Belgium) Emile Daems	(Belgium) Jos Hoevenaers	(Belgium) Jos Van Bael
1963	(Italy) Guido De Rosso	(Italy) Italo Zilioli	(Belgium) Emile Daems
1964	(Italy) Franco Cribiori	(Italy) Giovanni Bettinelli	(Italy) Roberto Poggiali
1965	(Italy) Italo Zilioli	(Italy) Giuseppe Fezzardi	(Italy) Luciano Galbo
1966	(Italy) Giuseppe Fezzardi	(West Germany) Hans Junkermann	(Switzerland) Willy Spühler
1967	(Italy) Adriano Passuello	(Italy) Franco Bitossi	(Italy) Dino Zandegù
1968	(Italy) Alberto Della Torre	(Italy) Mario Anni	(Italy) Claudio Michelotto
