= Franco Cribiori =

Italian cyclist and manager

Personal information
- Full name: Franco Cribiori
- Born: 28 September 1939 (age 87) Corsico, Italy

Cycling career
- Sport: Cycling
- Discipline: Road
- Role: Rider

Professional teams
- 1960–1961: Legnano
- 1962: San Pellegrino
- 1963–1964: Gazzola
- 1965: Ignis
- 1966: Vittadello
- 1967–1968: G.B.C.

Managerial teams
- 1969: G.B.C.
- 1970–1972: Dreher
- 1973–1977: Brooklyn
- 1978: Intercontinentale
- 1979: Sapa
- 1980–1981: Magniflex
- 1982–1989: Atala

Franco Cribiori (born 28 September 1939) is an Italian former racing cyclist and cycling manager who had a career as a cyclist from 1960 to 1968 and then a career as a manager from 1969 to 1989. Cribiori was born in Corsico.

== Palmarès ==
Date	Placing	Event	Location	Country
1962	1	Coppa Placci		San Marino
12 October 1963	1	Milano–Torino		Italy
1964	1	Giro dell'Appennino		Italy
19 July 1964	1	Giro del Ticino		Switzerland
11 July 1965	1	Tre Province		Italy
12 July 1966	1	GP Montelupo		Italy
