= 1964 Brabantse Pijl =

Race details
- Dates: 1 April 1964
- Stages: 1
- Distance: 200 km (124.3 mi)
- Winning time: 5h 10' 00"

Results
	Winner	Arnaldo Pambianco (ITA)
	Second	Yvo Molenaers (BEL)
	Third	Victor Van Schil (BEL)

The 1964 Brabantse Pijl was the fourth edition of the Brabantse Pijl cycle race and was held on 1 April 1964. The race started and finished in Brussels. The race was won by Arnaldo Pambianco.

== General classification ==
Final general classification

Rank	Rider	Time
1	Arnaldo Pambianco (ITA)	5h 10' 00"
2	Yvo Molenaers (BEL)	+ 2"
3	Victor Van Schil (BEL)	+ 2"
4	Alfons Hermans (BEL)	+ 2"
5	Benoni Beheyt (BEL)	+ 2"
6	Gilbert Desmet (BEL)	+ 2"
7	Willy Monty (BEL)	+ 2"
8	Emile Daems (BEL)	+ 2"
9	Jef Planckaert (BEL)	+ 2"
10	Constant Jongen (BEL)	+ 2"
