= Luigi Ferrando (cyclist) =

Italian cyclist

Personal information
- Born: 28 April 1911 Acquasanta, Italy
- Died: 7 February 2003 (aged 91) Genoa

Cycling career
- Sport: Cycling
- Disciplines: Road, cyclo-cross
- Role: Rider

Luigi Ferrando (28 April 1911 – 7 February 2003) was an Italian racing cyclist. He was the first non-Spanish rider to win the Trofeo Masferrer, in 1935.

== Biography ==
Born in 1911, Ferrando began to run as young boy in the 1920s. He participated in several editions of Milan–San Remo and, in 1935, he won the Masferrer Trophy in Catalonia.

Also in the 1930s, won several tours of the Apennines and Italian cyclocross championships.

== Palmarès ==
- 1930: 2° on Tre Valli Varesine
- 1932: 1º on Italian National Cyclo-cross Championships
- 1935: 1º on Italian National Cyclo-cross Championships
- 1935: Champion on Trofeu Masferrer
- 1936: 1º on Italian National Cyclo-cross Championships
- 1938: 1º on Italian National Cyclo-cross Championships
- 1938: Champion on Giro dell'Appennino
- 1939: 1º on Italian National Cyclo-cross Championships
