= Raymond Huguet =

French cyclist (1938–2022)

Personal information
- Born: 8 February 1938 Sargé-sur-Braye, France
- Died: 21 September 2022 (aged 84)

Cycling career
- Sport: Cycling
- Discipline: Road

Professional teams
- 1961: Helyett–Fynsec–Hutchinson
- 1962: Peugeot–BP–Dunlop
- 1963: Bertin–Porter 39–Milremo

Raymond Huguet (8 February 1938 – 21 September 2022) was a French professional cyclist. He raced professionally from 1961 to 1963 and competed in the 1961 Giro d'Italia.

== Awards ==
- Mérite Veldor (1964)
