= Mountains classification in the Giro d'Italia =

Mountain classification of bicycle cycling in Italy

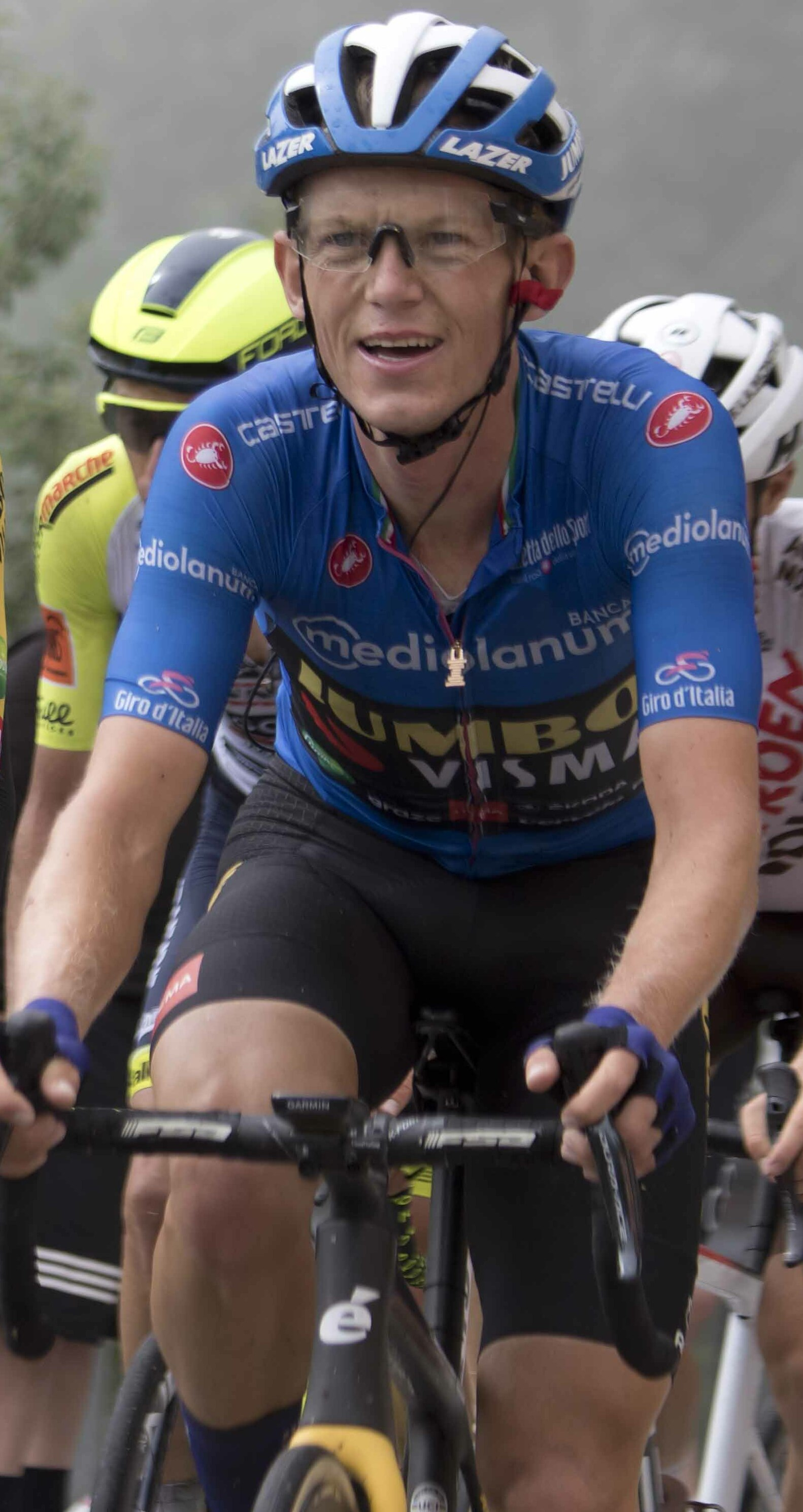
- Koen Bouwman wearing the blue jersey during the 2022 Giro d'Italia
- Sport: Road Cycling
- Competition: Giro d'Italia
- Awarded for: Best climber in mountain stages
- Local name: Gran Premio della Montagna (Italian)

History
- First award: 1933
- Editions: 87 (as of 2024)
- First winner: Alfredo Binda (ITA)
- Most wins: Gino Bartali (ITA) (7 wins)
- Most recent: Giulio Ciccone (ITA)

The Mountains classification in the Giro d'Italia is a secondary classification that is a part of the Giro d'Italia, one of cycling's Grand Tour races. In this classification, points are awarded to the leading riders over designated climbs. The climbs are put into different classifications based on difficulty and their position on that day's stage. Bonus points are given to mountain top finishes and to the first riders over the Cima Coppi, traditionally adjudged as the highest point of the entire Giro.

The classification was first calculated in 1933; from 1974 to 2011, the leader of the mountains classification in the Giro d'Italia wore the maglia verde (from Italian: "green jersey"): in 2012, as part of a sponsorship deal, the jersey color was changed to blue (maglia azzurra).

== History ==
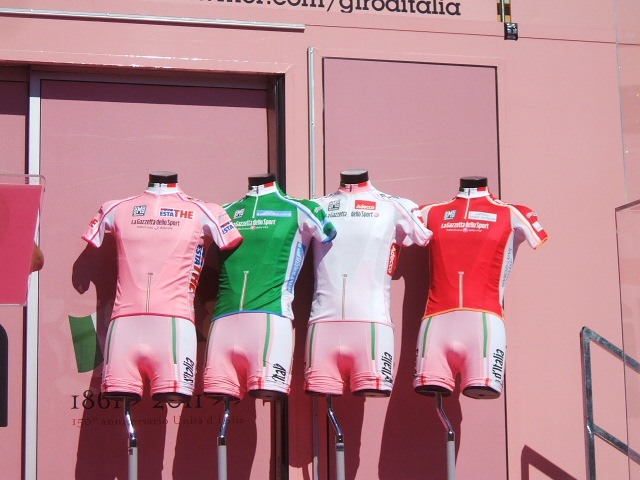
Until 2011 (pictured, second from the left), the jersey for the mountains classification was green.

The mountains classification was added to the Giro d'Italia in 1933. In the inaugural year of the classification, the organizers chose select climbs and awarded points to the first three riders who crossed the climbs. Alfredo Binda was first over each climb and won the first mountains classification. In 1974, the organizers added a green jersey to designate the leader of the classification. The green jersey was used until 2012, when the classification's sponsor, Banca Mediolanum, renewed its sponsorship for another four years and desired the jersey to be blue rather than green.

== Winners ==
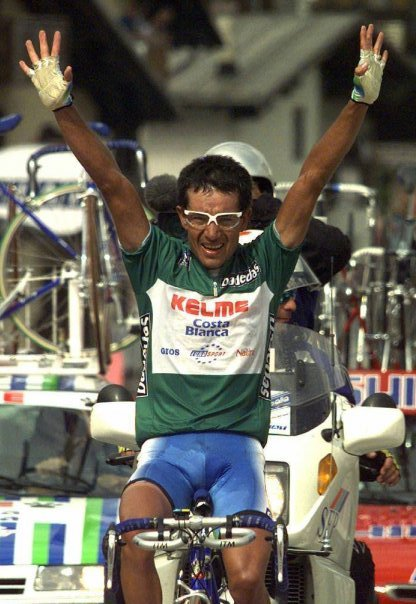
Chepe González winning a stage while leading the mountains classification during the 1997 Giro d'Italia

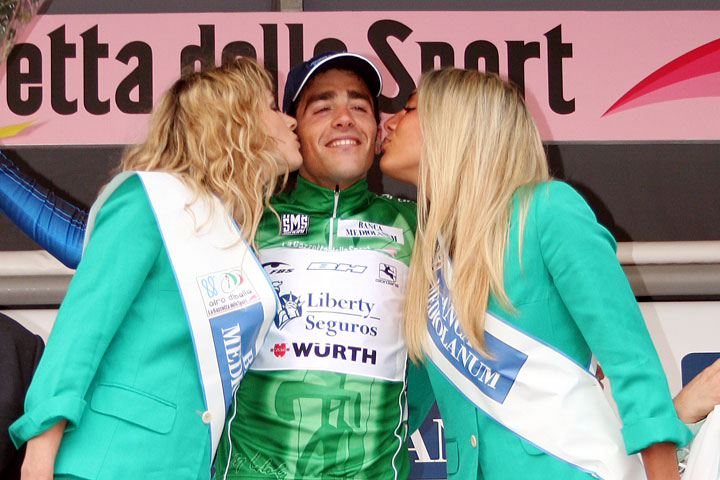
Koldo Gil receives the leader's green jersey at the 2005 Giro d'Italia

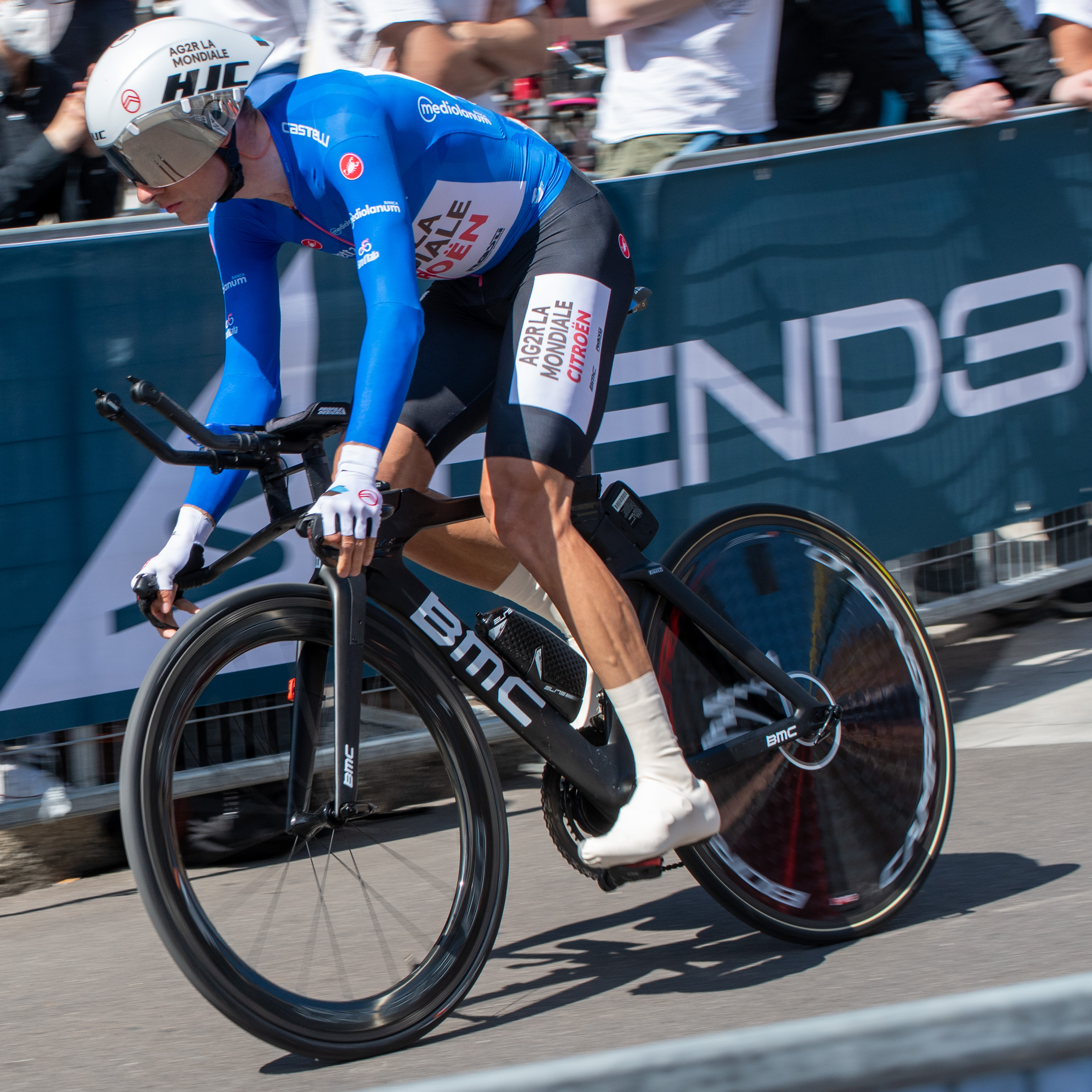
Geoffrey Bouchard wearing the blue jersey during a time trail at the 2021 Giro d'Italia

Key
*	Winner won general classification in the same year
‡	Winner won general and points classification in the same year

- The "Year" column refers to the year the competition was held, and wikilinks to the article about that edition of the race.
- The "Points" column refers to the number of points that the rider had in the mountains classification.
- The "Margin" column refers to the margin of time or points by which the winner defeated the runner-up.
- The "Stage wins" column refers to the number of stages wins the winner had during the race.

Giro d'Italia mountains classification winners
Year	Country	Cyclist	Sponsor/team	Points	Margin	Stage wins
1933	Italy	Alfredo Binda^{*}	Legnano	?	?	6
1934	Italy	Remo Bertoni	Legnano	31	10	0
1935	Italy	Gino Bartali	Fréjus	44	16	1
1936	Italy	Gino Bartali^{*}	Legnano	38.5	13.5	3
1937	Italy	Gino Bartali^{*}	Legnano	37	12	4
1938	Italy	Giovanni Valetti^{*}	Fréjus	29	3	3
1939	Italy	Gino Bartali	Legnano	22	3	4
1940	Italy	Gino Bartali	Legnano	25	4	2
1941	—	Not contested	—	—	—	—
1942	—	Not contested	—	—	—	—
1943	—	Not contested	—	—	—	—
1944	—	Not contested	—	—	—	—
1945	—	Not contested	—	—	—	—
1946	Italy	Gino Bartali^{*}	Legnano	27	7	0
1947	Italy	Gino Bartali	Legnano	24	3	1
1948	Italy	Fausto Coppi	Bianchi	25	9	0
1949	Italy	Fausto Coppi^{*}	Bianchi	46	5	3
1950	Switzerland	Hugo Koblet^{*}	Guerra–Svizzera	43	14	2
1951	France	Louison Bobet	Bottecchia	29	2	1
1952	France	Raphaël Géminiani	Bianchi	31	3	0
1953	Italy	Pasquale Fornara	Cilo	33	13	1
1954	Italy	Fausto Coppi	Bianchi	6	1	1
1955	Italy	Gastone Nencini	Leo–Chlorodont	7	1	2
1956	Luxembourg	Charly Gaul^{*} (Note: The 1956 Giro d'Italia had two mountain competitions: the Trofeo Dolomiti and the Trofeo Appennini. Charly Gaul won the former and Federico Bahamontes, the latter.)	Faema	20	15	3
1956	Spain	Federico Bahamontes	Girardengo	30	17	0
1957	France	Raphaël Géminiani	Saint Raphaël	56	18	0
1958	Belgium	Jean Brankart	Saint Raphaël	56	17	4
1959	Luxembourg	Charly Gaul^{*}	Emi	560	240	3
1960	Belgium	Rik Van Looy	Faema	250	40	3
1961	Italy	Vito Taccone	Atala	270	140	1
1962	Spain	Angelino Soler	Ghigi	260	160	3
1963	Italy	Vito Taccone	Lygie	520	400	5
1964	Italy	Franco Bitossi	Spring Oil	200	60	4
1965	Italy	Franco Bitossi	Filotex	250	90	1
1966	Italy	Franco Bitossi	Filotex	490	170	2
1967	Spain	Aurelio González	KAS–Kaskol	460	370	1
1968	Belgium	Eddy Merckx^{‡}	Faema	340	160	1
1969	Italy	Claudio Michelotto	Max Meyer	330	80	1
1970	Belgium	Martin Van Den Bossche	Molteni	460	40	0
1971	Spain	José Manuel Fuente	KAS	360	90	1
1972	Spain	José Manuel Fuente	KAS	490	040	0
1973	Spain	José Manuel Fuente	KAS	550	40	1
1974	Spain	José Manuel Fuente	KAS	510	180	5
1975	Spain	Andrés Oliva (Note: Francisco Galdós & Andrés Oliva, both Spanish riders from the KAS team, finished the race with the same number of points in the mountains classification and were both winners.)	KAS	300	60	0
1975	Spain	Francisco Galdós	KAS	300	60	1
1976	Spain	Andrés Oliva	KAS	535	145	0
1977	Spain	Faustino Fernández Ovies	KAS	675	185	0
1978	Switzerland	Ueli Sutter	Zonca	830	310	0
1979	Italy	Claudio Bortolotto	Sanson	495	165	1
1980	Italy	Claudio Bortolotto	San Giacomo	670	270	0
1981	Italy	Claudio Bortolotto	Santini	510	10	0
1982	Belgium	Lucien Van Impe	Metauromobili	860	480	0
1983	Belgium	Lucien Van Impe	Metauromobili	70	27	1
1984	France	Laurent Fignon	Renault–Elf	53	13	1
1985	Spain	José Luis Navarro	Zor	54	7	0
1986	Spain	Pedro Muñoz	Fagor	54	19	1
1987	United Kingdom	Robert Millar	Panasonic–Isostar	97	44	1
1988	United States	Andrew Hampsten^{*}	7–Eleven–Hoonved	59	4	2
1989	Colombia	Luis Herrera	Café de Colombia	70	32	2
1990	Italy	Claudio Chiappucci	Carrera Jeans–Vagabond	74	18	0
1991	Spain	Iñaki Gastón	CLAS–Cajastur	75	6	0
1992	Italy	Claudio Chiappucci	Carrera Jeans–Vagabond	76	31	0
1993	Italy	Claudio Chiappucci	Carrera Jeans–Tassoni	42	2	1
1994	Switzerland	Pascal Richard	GB–MG Maglificio	78	20	1
1995	Italy	Mariano Piccoli	Brescialat	75	30	1
1996	Italy	Mariano Piccoli	Brescialat	69	32	0
1997	Colombia	Chepe González	Kelme–Costa Blanca	99	64	1
1998	Italy	Marco Pantani^{*}	Mercatone Uno–Bianchi	89	27	2
1999	Colombia	Chepe González	Kelme–Costa Blanca	61	16	1
2000	Italy	Francesco Casagrande	Vini Caldirola–Sidermec	71	24	1
2001	Colombia	Fredy González	Selle Italia–Pacific	73	31	1
2002	Mexico	Julio Alberto Pérez	Colombia–Selle Italia	69	36	2
2003	Colombia	Fredy González	Colombia–Selle Italia	100	22	0
2004	Germany	Fabian Wegmann	Gerolsteiner	56	2	0
2005	Venezuela	José Rujano	Colombia–Selle Italia	143	86	1
2006	Spain	Juan Manuel Gárate	Quick-Step–Innergetic	64	8	1
2007	Italy	Leonardo Piepoli	Saunier Duval–Prodir	79	33	1
2008	Italy	Emanuele Sella	CSF Group–Navigare	136	73	3
2009	Italy	Stefano Garzelli	Acqua & Sapone–Caffè Mokambo	61	16	1
2010	Australia	Matthew Lloyd	Omega Pharma–Lotto	56	15	1
2011	Italy	Stefano Garzelli	Acqua & Sapone	67	24	0
2012	Italy	Matteo Rabottini	Farnese Vini–Selle Italia	84	40	1
2013	Italy	Stefano Pirazzi	Bardiani Valvole–CSF Inox	82	37	0
2014	Colombia	Julián Arredondo	Trek Factory Racing	173	41	1
2015	Italy	Giovanni Visconti	Movistar Team	125	3	0
2016	Spain	Mikel Nieve	Team Sky	152	18	1
2017	Spain	Mikel Landa	Team Sky	224	106	1
2018	United Kingdom	Chris Froome^{*}	Team Sky	125	17	2
2019	Italy	Giulio Ciccone	Trek–Segafredo	267	152	1
2020	Portugal	Ruben Guerreiro	EF Pro Cycling	234	77	1
2021	France	Geoffrey Bouchard	AG2R Citroën Team	184	44	0
2022	Netherlands	Koen Bouwman	Team Jumbo–Visma	294	131	2
2023	France	Thibaut Pinot	Groupama–FDJ	237	37	0
2024	Slovenia	Tadej Pogačar^{*}	UAE Team Emirates	270	64	6
2025	Italy	Lorenzo Fortunato	XDS Astana Team	355	154	0
2026	Italy	Giulio Ciccone	Lidl–Trek	277	11	0

=== Multiple winners ===
As of 2026, 16 cyclists have won the mountains classification more than once.

Multiple winners of the Giro d'Italia mountains classification
Cyclist	Total	Years
Gino Bartali (ITA)	7	1935, 1936, 1937, 1939, 1940, 1946, 1947
José Manuel Fuente (ESP)	4	1971, 1972, 1973, 1974
Fausto Coppi (ITA)	3	1948, 1949, 1954
Franco Bitossi (ITA)	3	1964, 1965, 1966
Claudio Bortolotto (ITA)	3	1979, 1980, 1981
Claudio Chiappucci (ITA)	3	1990, 1992, 1993
Raphaël Géminiani (FRA)	2	1952, 1957
Charly Gaul (LUX)	2	1956, 1959
Vito Taccone (ITA)	2	1961, 1963
Andrés Oliva (ESP)	2	1975, 1976
Lucien Van Impe (BEL)	2	1982, 1983
Mariano Piccoli (ITA)	2	1995, 1996
Chepe González (COL)	2	1997, 1999
Fredy González (COL)	2	2001, 2003
Stefano Garzelli (ITA)	2	2009, 2011
Giulio Ciccone (ITA)	2	2019, 2026

=== By nationality ===
Riders from sixteen countries have won the Mountains classification in the Giro d'Italia.

Giro d'Italia mountains classification winners by nationality
Country	No. of winning cyclists	No. of wins
Italy	23	41
Spain	13	17
Belgium	5	6
France	5	6
Colombia	4	6
Switzerland	3	3
United Kingdom	2	2
Luxembourg	1	2
United States	1	1
Mexico	1	1
Germany	1	1
Venezuela	1	1
Australia	1	1
Portugal	1	1
Netherlands	1	1
Slovenia	1	1

== Distribution of points ==
The points that are gained by consecutive riders reaching a mountain top are distributed according to 5 categories:

Tipologia	1st	2nd	3rd	4th	5th	6th	7th	8th	9th
Cima Coppi	50	30	20	14	10	6	4	2	1
First Category	40 (50)	18 (24)	12 (16)	9	6	4	2	1	-
Second Category	18	8	6	4	2	1	-	-	-
Third Category	9	4	2	1	-	-	-	-	-
Fourth Category	3	2	1	-	-	-	-	-	-

The figures in brackets are awarded if the first category climb is also the stage finish. The organization of the race determines which mountains are included for the mountains classification and in which category they are. The points for the Cima Coppi are awarded once every Giro, for the summit at the highest altitude in that Giro.

== Days in leader's jersey ==
after the end of 2026 Giro d'Italia

Rider	Days	Stages
(Italy) Gino Bartali	73	83
(Belgium) Eddy Merckx	56	57
(Spain) Jose Manuel Fuente	46	50
(Italy) Mariano Piccoli	45	45
(Italy) Claudio Bortolotto	41	41
(Italy) Vito Taccone	39	39
(Italy) Fausto Coppi	37	37
(Spain) Federico Bahamontes	34	35
(Belgium) Lucien Van Impe	34	35
(Colombia) Fredy González	33	33
(Luxembourg) Charly Gaul	31	32
(Italy) Claudio Chiappucci	28	28
(France) Raphaël Géminiani	27	28
(Spain) Andrés Oliva	26	29
(Italy) Michele Dancelli	25	26
(Spain) Julio Jiménez	25	25

=== Riders leading all stages of an edition ===
No rider wore the jersey in all stages of a single edition.

In some editions the Mountain Classification was not compiled in the first stages (no points awarded in the first stages). Some riders led all the stages after the first points were awarded:

- Alfredo Binda (ITA) 1933 (first stage awarding points: 5th stage, 13 stages)
- Remo Bertoni (ITA) 1934 (first stage awarding points: 5th stage, 13 stages)
- Gino Bartali (ITA) 1935 (first stage awarding points: 6th stage, 14 stages)
- Gino Bartali (ITA) 1936 (first stage awarding points: 4th stage, 18 stages)
- Pasquale Fornara (ITA) 1953 (first stage awarding points: 2nd stage, 20 stages)
- Charly Gaul (LUX) 1959 (first stage awarding points: 3rd stage, 20 stages)
- Jose Manuel Fuente (ESP) 1974 (first stage awarding points: 3rd stage, 21 stages)
- Claudio Bortolotto (ITA) 1980 (first stage awarding points: 2nd stage, 21 stages)
- Fredy González (COL) 2003 (first stage awarding points: 2nd stage, 20 stages)
- Emanuele Sella (ITA) 2008 (first stage awarding points: 2nd stage, 20 stages)
