= Milano–Vignola =

Race details
- Date: Late September
- Region: Emilia-Romagna, Italy
- English name: Milan–Vignola
- Local name(s): Milano–Vignola (in Italian)
- Discipline: Road
- Competition: UCI Europe Tour
- Type: Single-day
- Organiser: RCS Sport

History
- First edition: 1952
- Editions: 44
- Final edition: 1996
- First winner: (Italy) Antonio Bevilacqua
- Most wins: (Italy) Adriano Durante (Italy) Marino Basso (Belgium) Rik Van Linden (3 wins)
- Final winner: (Italy) Fabio Roscioli

The Milano–Vignola was a professional road bicycle race held annually in the Province of Modena, Italy. The last edition took place in 1996, becoming the Gran Premio Bruno Beghelli in 1997.

== Winners ==
Year	Country	Rider	Team
1952	Italy	Antonio Bevilacqua	
1953– 1955	No race		
1956	Italy	Pierino Baffi	
1957	No race		
1958	Italy	Adriano Zamboni	
1959	Italy	Adriano Zamboni	
1960	Italy	Alessandro Fantini	
1961	Belgium	Willy Vannitsen	
1962	Italy	Vendramino Bariviera	
1963	Italy	Adriano Durante	
1964	Italy	Guido De Rosso	
1965	Italy	Guido De Rosso	
1966	Italy	Adriano Durante	
1967	West Germany	Rudi Altig	
1968	Italy	Marino Basso	
1969	Italy	Attilio Rota	
1970	Italy	Adriano Durante	
1971	Italy	Marino Basso	
1972	Belgium	Julien Van Lint	
1973	Italy	Marino Basso	
1974	Italy	Enrico Paolini	
1975	Belgium	Rik Van Linden	
1976	Belgium	Rik Van Linden	
1977	Italy	Luciano Borgognoni	
1978	Belgium	Rik Van Linden	
1979	Belgium	Roger De Vlaeminck	
1980	Italy	Giovanni Battaglin	
1981	West Germany	Gregor Braun	
1982	Italy	Giovanni Mantovani	
1983	Italy	Francesco Moser	
1984	Italy	Mario Beccia	
1985	Italy	Emanuele Bombini	
1986	Italy	Roberto Visentini	
1987	Italy	Giuseppe Saronni	
1988	Italy	Adriano Baffi	
1989	Italy	Adriano Baffi	
1990	Italy	Mario Cipollini	
1991	Italy	Silvio Martinello	
1992	Kazakhstan	Andrei Teterijuk	
1993	Italy	Alberto Elli	
1994	Italy	Angelo Lecchi	
1995	Italy	Angelo Canzonieri	
1996	Italy	Fabio Roscioli	
