= Romeo Venturelli =

Italian cyclist

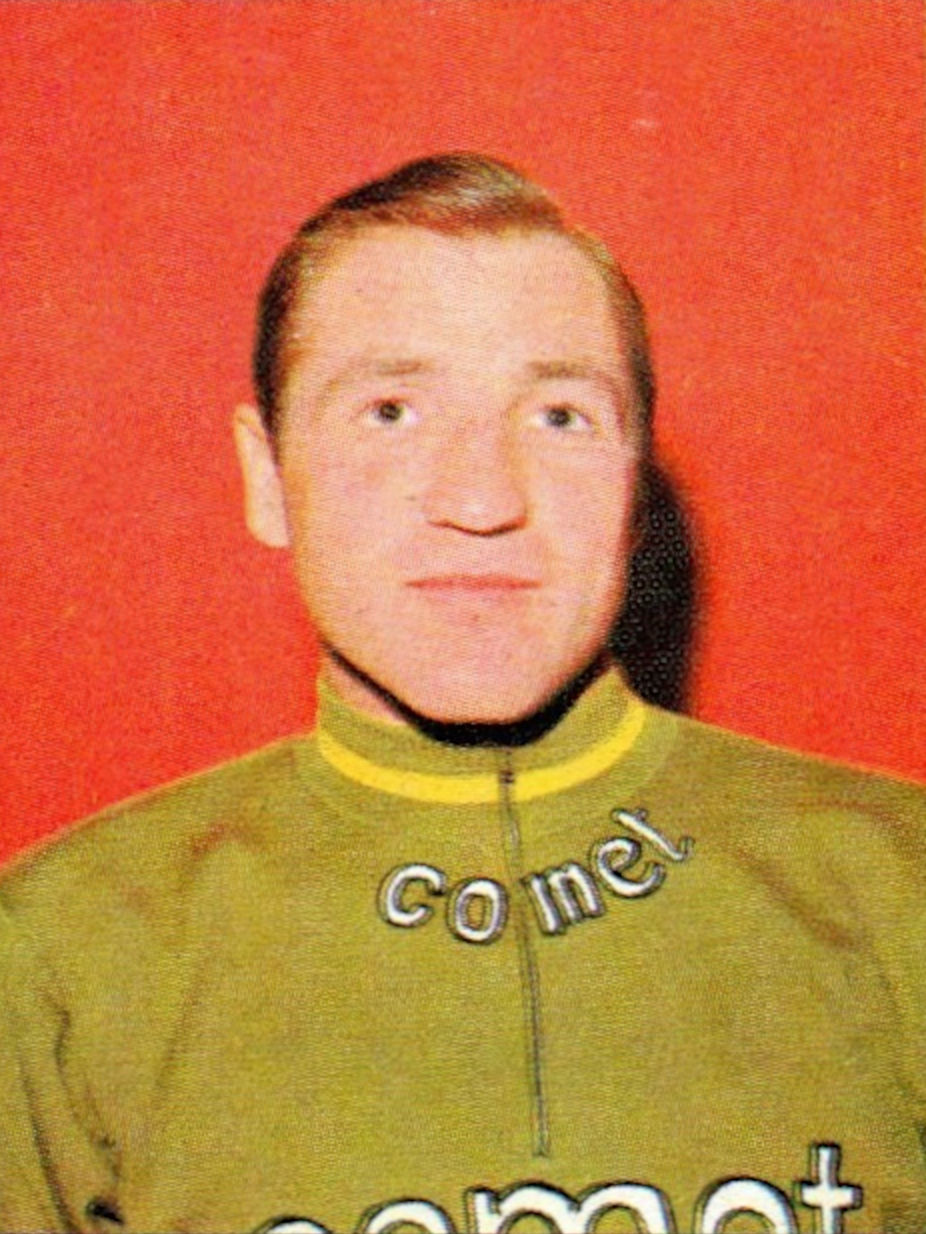
- Venturelli in 1967

Personal information
- Born: 9 December 1938 Lama Mocogno, Italy
- Died: 2 April 2011 (aged 72) Pavullo nel Frignano, Italy

Cycling career
- Sport: Cycling
- Discipline: Road
- Role: Rider

Professional teams
- 1960: San Pellegrino
- 1961–1962: Molteni
- 1963: San Pellegrino–Firte
- 1964: Ignis
- 1965: Libertas Lazio
- 1965–1966: Bianchi–Mobylette
- 1967: Salamini–Comet
- 1970–1971: Zonca

Romeo Venturelli (9 December 1938 – 2 April 2011) was an Italian racing cyclist. He won stage 2 of the 1960 Giro d'Italia.

== Major results ==
1957
1st Piccolo Giro di Lombardia
1959
1st Gran Premio della Liberazione
3rd Overall Peace Race

1st Stages 4a (ITT), 8 & 12a (ITT)

1960
1st Trofeo Baracchi (with Diego Ronchini)
1st Stage 2 (ITT) Giro d'Italia
1st Stage 6b (ITT) Paris–Nice
1st Stage 2 Menton–Roma
6th Giro di Lombardia
9th Overall Tour de Romandie

1st Stage 1

1965
1st Gran Piemonte
2nd Overall Giro di Sardegna
2nd Grand Prix de Saint-Raphael
3rd Milano–Torino
10th Trofeo Laigueglia
