= Torpado (cycling team) =

Cycling team (1951-1962)

Team information
- Registered: Italy
- Founded: 1951
- Disbanded: 1962
- Discipline: Road
- Bicycles: Torpado

Team name history
- 1951–1952 1953–1955 1956 1957 1958 1959 1960–1962: Torpado; Torpado–Ursus; Torpado–Pirelli; Torpado–Girardengo; Torpado; Torpado–Clement; Torpado

Torpado was an Italian professional cycling team that existed from 1951 to 1962. It was sponsored by the bicycle manufacturing company of the same name.

The team competed in 11 consecutive editions of the Giro d'Italia, from 1952 to 1962, where they achieved nine stage wins and having a best general classification result of 4th by Cleto Maule in 1956. Maule also notably won the 1955 Giro di Lombardia with the team.
