= Luciano Ciancola =

Italian cyclist

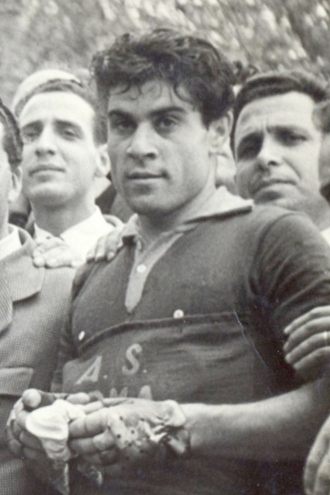
- Ciancola in 1952

Personal information
- Born: 22 October 1929 Rome, Italy
- Died: 25 July 2011 (aged 81) Ardea, Lazio, Italy

Sport
- Sport: Cycling
Medal record
Representing Italy
World Championships
Gold medal – first place	1952 Luxembourg	Road race

Luciano Ciancola (22 October 1929 – 25 July 2011) was an Italian road cyclist. As an amateur he won the 1950 Giro di Campania and the road race at the 1952 World Championships. Between 1952 and 1960 he rode professionally and placed second in the Giro di Sicilia in 1956.
