= Arnaldo Pambianco =

Italian cyclist (1935–2022)

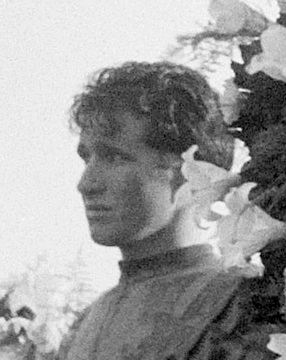
- Pambianco in 1957

Personal information
- Nickname: Il garibaldino
- Born: 16 August 1935 Bertinoro, Italy
- Died: 6 July 2022 (aged 86) Bertinoro, Italy

Cycling career
- Sport: Cycling
- Discipline: Road
- Role: Rider

Professional teams
- 1957–1960: Legnano
- 1961: Fides
- 1962: Ignis–Moschettieri
- 1963–1966: Salvarani

Major wins
- Grand Tours Giro d'Italia General classification (1961)
Medal record
Representing Italy
Men's road bicycle racing
World Championships
| Silver medal – second place | 1957 Waregem | Amateur's Road Race |

Arnaldo Pambianco (16 August 1935 – 6 July 2022) was an Italian professional road racing cyclist who was active between 1956 and 1966. The highlight of his career was his overall win in the 1961 Giro d'Italia. He competed at the 1956 Summer Olympics in the road race and finished in seventh individually and fourth with the Italian team.

== Career achievements ==
=== Major results ===
1956
Summer Olympics

4th Team time trial
7th Road race

1958
8th Milano–Vignola
9th Overall Giro di Sardegna
1959
3rd Giro di Romagna
1960
1st Milano–Torino
2nd Overall Giro di Sardegna
5th Giro dell'Emilia
5th GP Forli
7th Overall Tour de France
7th Overall Giro d'Italia
1961
1st Overall Giro d'Italia
2nd Road race, National Road Championships
2nd Overall Giro di Sardegna
2nd Coppa Bernocchi
3rd GP Forli
8th Coppa Sabatini
10th Giro di Lombardia
1962
2nd Trofeo Baracchi (with Ercole Baldini)
4th Overall Four Days of Dunkirk
4th Giro di Campania
4th Giro di Romagna
5th Road race, UCI Road World Championships
5th Giro dell'Emilia
7th Tre Valli Varesine
8th Overall Giro di Sardegna
10th Giro del Lazio
1963
1st Overall Giro di Sardegna
1st Stage 18 Giro d'Italia
1964
1st Brabantse Pijl
4th Giro di Romagna
1965
2nd Giro di Romagna
1966
10th Overall Paris–Nice

=== Grand Tour general classification results timeline ===
| Grand Tour | 1958 | 1959 | 1960 | 1961 | 1962 | 1963 | 1964 | 1965 | 1966 |
|---|---|---|---|---|---|---|---|---|---|
| Giro d'Italia | 27 | DNF | 7 | 1 | DNF | 13 | 13 | 19 | 35 |
| Tour de France | — | — | 7 | — | 25 | — | 21 | 19 | — |
| Vuelta a España | — | — | — | — | — | — | — | — | — |

Legend
| — | Did not compete |
| DNF | Did not finish |
| DSQ | Disqualified |
