= Idrio Bui =

Italian racing cyclist (1932–2022)

Personal information
- Born: 14 June 1932 Sinalunga, Italy
- Died: 15 December 2022 (aged 90) Sinalunga, Italy

Cycling career
- Sport: Cycling

Amateur teams
- 1952: Tempora Bettolle
- 1954: CS Firenze
- 1955: US Porta Romana
- 1956: Tempora Bettolle

Professional teams
- 1958–1960: Ghigi
- 1961: Fides
- 1962: Bianchi
- 1962: Ignis
- 1963–1964: Lygie

Idrio Bui (14 June 1932 – 15 December 2022) was an Italian racing cyclist. He raced professionally from 1957 to 1964.

== Awards ==
=== Amateur ===
- Winner of the Circuito di Cesa (1952, 1953, 1955)
- Winner of the Coppa Fiera di Mercatale (1952)
- Winner of the Gran Premio Industria del Cuoio e delle Pelli (1954)
- Winner of the Coppa Sabatini (1956)

=== Professional ===
- Winner of the Coppa Cicogna (1958)
