= Renato Giusti =

Italian cyclist (born 1938)

Personal information
- Born: 25 July 1938 (age 88) Veronella

Cycling career
- Sport: Cycling
- Role: Rider

Renato Giusti (born 25 July 1938) is an Italian former racing cyclist. He won stages 12 and 18 of the 1961 Giro d'Italia.
