= Pietro Chiodini =

Italian cyclist

Personal information
- Born: 27 July 1934
- Died: 28 August 2010 (aged 76)

Cycling career
- Sport: Cycling
- Role: Rider

Pietro Chiodini (27 July 1934 – 28 August 2010) was an Italian racing cyclist. He won stage 11 of the 1961 Giro d'Italia.
