= Antonio Franchi (cyclist) =

Italian cyclist (1936–2019)

Personal information
- Born: 10 April 1936
- Died: 30 July 2019 (aged 83)

Cycling career
- Sport: Cycling
- Role: Rider

Antonio Franchi (10 April 1936 – 30 July 2019) was an Italian racing cyclist. He rode in the 1964 Tour de France.
