= Vito Taccone =

Italian cyclist

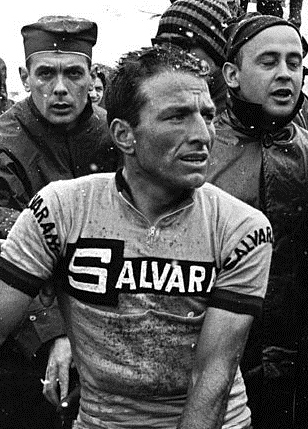
- Taccone at the 1965 Giro d'Italia

Personal information
- Full name: Vito Taccone
- Born: 6 May 1940 Avezzano, Italy
- Died: 15 October 2007 (aged 67) Avezzano, Italy

Cycling career
- Sport: Cycling
- Discipline: Road
- Role: Rider

Professional teams
- 1961–1962: Atala
- 1963: Lygie
- 1964–1965: Salvarani
- 1966: Vittadello
- 1967–1969: Germanvox-Wega
- 1970: Cosatto-Marsicano

Major wins
- Giro d'Italia, 7 stages Mountains classification 1961, 1963; Giro di Lombardia (1961); Tre Giorni del Sud (1961); Giro del Piemonte (1962); Giro di Toscana (1963); Tempio di Pausania (1963); Giro di Campania (1964); Milano–Torino (1965); Trofeo Matteotti (1966)

Vito Taccone (6 May 1940 – 15 October 2007) was an Italian road cyclist.

Taccone made his professional debut in 1961. In the same year he won the Giro di Lombardia. During the 1964 Tour de France, he was accused of causing other cyclists to fall, leading to a fight with Spanish racer Fernando Manzaneque and his non-appearance in following tours.

His other victories include one Giro del Piemonte (1962), one Giro della Toscana (1963), one Milano–Torino (1965) and five stages overall at the 1963 Giro d'Italia.

In June 2007, he was arrested and charged with selling counterfeit and stolen clothing.
