= San Pellegrino (cycling team) =

Italian cycling team (1956-1963)

Team information
- Registered: Italy
- Founded: 1956
- Disbanded: 1963
- Discipline: Road

Key personnel
- Team manager: Gino Bartali

Team name history
- 1956–1962 1963: San Pellegrino; San Pellegrino–Firte

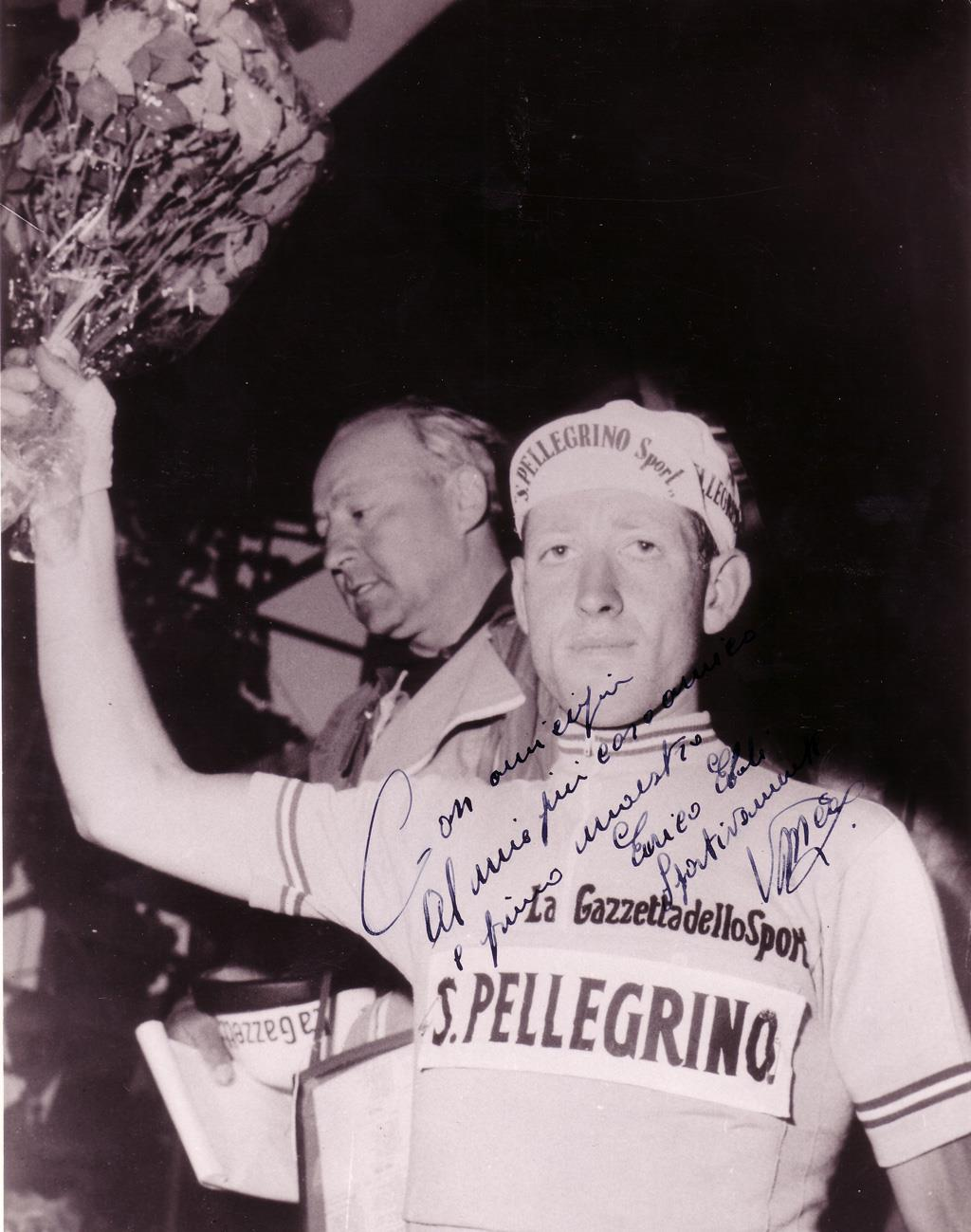
Vincenzo Meco, a member of the San Pellegrino team, after winning stage 14 of the 1962 Giro d’Italia

San Pellegrino was an Italian professional cycling team that existed from 1956 to 1963. The team was sponsored by the S.Pellegrino mineral water company.

The team was selected to race in seven editions of the Giro d'Italia, where they achieved four stage wins.

== Major victories ==
- Giro del Ticino: Alfredo Sabbadin (1957)
- Giro di Toscana: Alfredo Sabbadin (1957), Marino Fontana (1961)
- Tre Valli Varesine: Giuseppe Fezzardi (1962)
- Giro del Trentino: Enzo Moser (1962)
- Coppa Placci: Franco Cribiori (1962)
- Coppa Bernocchi: Aldo Moser (1963)

=== Giro d'Italia results ===
- Giro d'Italia
  - 7 participations
  - 4 stage wins:
    - 1, 1957: Alfredo Sabbadin
    - 1, 1960: Romeo Venturelli
    - 1, 1962: Vincenzo Meco
    - 1, 1963: Giorgio Zancanaro
