= Nello Velucchi =

Italian cyclist

Personal information
- Born: 9 February 1936 (age 90)

Cycling career
- Sport: Cycling
- Role: Rider

Nello Velucchi (born 9 February 1936) is an Italian racing cyclist. He rode in the 1962 Tour de France.
