= Augusto Marcaletti =

Italian cyclist

Personal information
- Full name: Augusto Marcaletti
- Born: 2 August 1934 Ternate, Italy
- Died: 5 June 2023 (aged 88)

Cycling career
- Sport: Cycling
- Role: Rider

Augusto Marcaletti (2 August 1934 – 5 June 2023) was an Italian racing cyclist. He finished in last place in the 1962 Tour de France.
