= Giuseppe Fallarini =

Italian cyclist (1934–2023)

Personal information
- Born: 4 May 1934 Vaprio d'Agogna, Italy
- Died: 15 May 2023 (aged 89) Vaprio d'Agogna, Italy

Cycling career
- Sport: Cycling
- Role: Rider

Giuseppe Fallarini (4 May 1934 – 15 May 2023) was an Italian racing cyclist. He rode in two editions of the Tour de France and in eight editions of the Giro d'Italia. He won a gold medal at the 1955 Mediterranean Games. Fallarini died on 15 May 2023, at the age of 89.
