= Friedhelm Fischerkeller =

German cyclist

Personal information
- Born: 3 January 1935
- Died: 28 January 2008 (aged 73)

Cycling career
- Sport: Cycling
- Role: Rider

Friedhelm Fischerkeller (3 January 1935 – 28 January 2008) was a German racing cyclist. He rode in the 1961 Tour de France.
