= Carlo Azzini =

Italian cyclist (1935–2020)

Personal information
- Born: 19 July 1935
- Died: 12 January 2020 (aged 84)

Cycling career
- Sport: Cycling
- Role: Rider

Carlo Azzini (19 July 1935 – 12 January 2020) was an Italian racing cyclist. He rode in the 1962 Tour de France.
