= Yvo Molenaers =

Belgian cyclist

Personal information
- Full name: Yvo Molenaers
- Born: 25 February 1934 (age 92) Herderen, Belgium

Cycling career
- Sport: Cycling
- Discipline: Road
- Role: Rider

Professional teams
- 1956–1957: Plume Sport
- 1957–1958: Groene Leeuw–Leopold
- 1958–1959: Ghigi–Coppi
- 1960–1962: Carpano
- 1963–1964: Wiel's–Groene Leeuw
- 1965–1967: Flandria–Romeo

Major wins
- Antwerp–Ougrée (1960); Tour de Luxembourg (1963); Mandel–Leie–Schelde (1966)

Yvo Molenaers (born 25 February 1934) is a Belgian racing cyclist. He won the 1963 Tour de Luxembourg.
