= Waldemaro Bartolozzi =

Italian cyclist (1927–2020)

Personal information
- Born: 26 October 1927 Scandicci, Italy
- Died: 16 December 2020 (aged 93) Scandicci, Italy

Cycling career
- Sport: Cycling
- Role: Rider

Waldemaro Bartolozzi (26 October 1927 – 16 December 2020) was an Italian racing cyclist. He finished in ninth place in the 1956 Giro d'Italia.
