= Giuseppe Dante =

Italian cyclist

Personal information
- Born: 14 March 1931
- Died: 21 November 2018 (aged 87)

Cycling career
- Sport: Cycling
- Role: Rider

Giuseppe Dante (14 March 1931 – 21 November 2018) was an Italian racing cyclist. He rode in the 1962 Tour de France.
