= Oreste Magni =

Italian cyclist

Personal information
- Born: 3 March 1936
- Died: 16 March 1975 (aged 39)

Cycling career
- Sport: Cycling
- Role: Rider

Oreste Magni (3 March 1936 – 16 March 1975) was an Italian racing cyclist. He won stage 4 of the 1961 Giro d'Italia.
