= Ezio Pizzoglio =

Italian cyclist

Personal information
- Born: 27 April 1937
- Died: 2006 (aged 68–69)

Cycling career
- Sport: Cycling
- Role: Rider

Ezio Pizzoglio (27 April 1937 – 2006) was an Italian racing cyclist. He rode in the 1961 Tour de France.
