= Germano Barale =

Italian cyclist

Personal information
- Born: 23 January 1936 (age 90)

Cycling career
- Sport: Cycling
- Role: Rider

Germano Barale (born 23 January 1936) is an Italian racing cyclist. He rode in the 1962 Tour de France.
