= Vendramino Bariviera =

Italian cyclist (1937–2001)

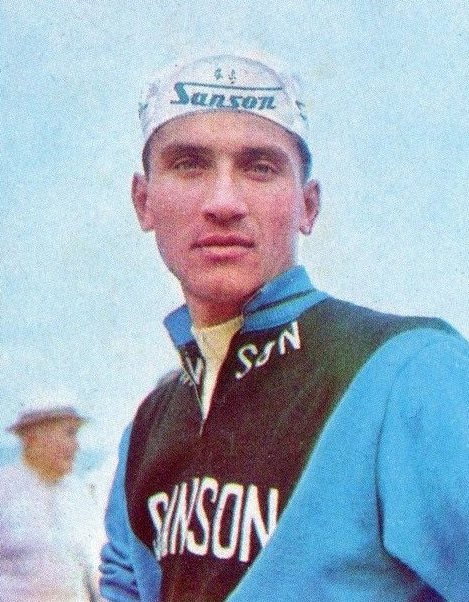

Personal information
- Full name: Vendramino Bariviera
- Born: 25 October 1937 Rome, Italy
- Died: 23 November 2001 (aged 64) Conegliano, Italy
- Height: 186 cm (6 ft 1 in)
- Weight: 72 kg (159 lb)

Cycling career
- Sport: Cycling
- Discipline: Road
- Role: Rider

Vendramino Bariviera (25 October 1937 – 23 November 2001) was an Italian racing cyclist who competed in the individual road race at the 1960 Summer Olympics. After the Olympics he turned professional and won several stages of the Giro d'Italia in 1963, 1964 and 1966. He rode the 1964 Tour de France and retired in 1967. His younger brother Renzo was an Olympic basketball player.
