= Aurelio Cestari =

Italian cyclist

Personal information
- Born: 16 June 1934 (age 92) Saletto, Italy

Cycling career
- Sport: Cycling

Aurelio Cestari (born 16 June 1934) is an Italian former cyclist. He competed in the individual and team road race events at the 1956 Summer Olympics.
