= Torpado =

Italian bicycle manufacturer

- Type: Private
- Industry: Bicycle industry
- Founded: 1895; 131 years ago, Padua
- Founder: Carlo Torresini
- Headquarters: Cavarzere, Italy
- Area served: Worldwide
- Products: Bicycles, E-bike and related components
- Parent: Cicli Esperia
- Website: https://www.torpado.com/en/

Torpado is an Italian bicycle manufacturing company that was founded in 1895 in Padua, Italy.

== History ==
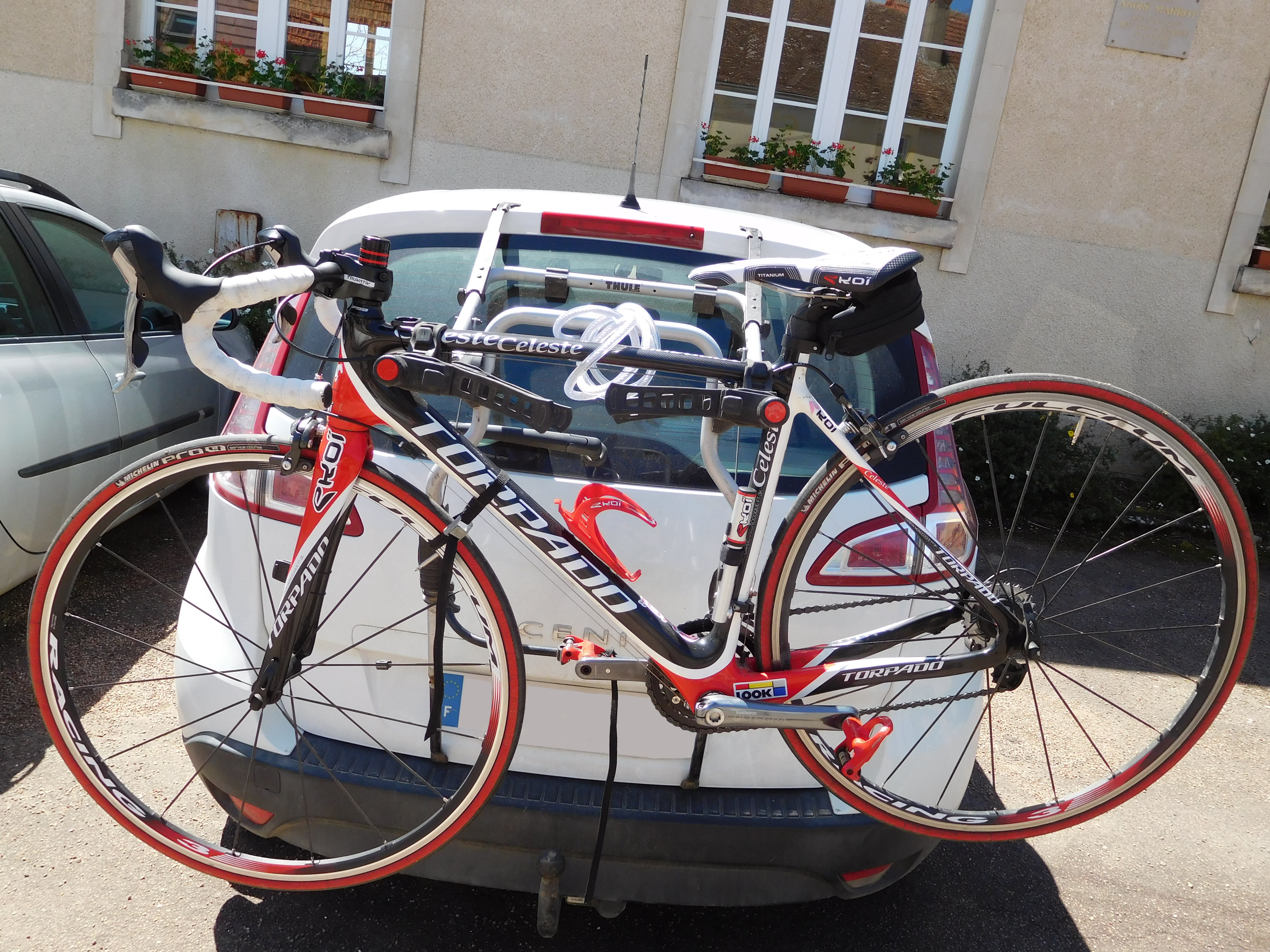
A Torpado road bike

Between 1951 and 1962, Torpado sponsored a professional road cycling team that competed in 11 editions of the Giro d'Italia.

In 2001, the company was bought by Cycles Esperia, who also acquired several other major brands including Bottecchia, Graziella, Stucchi, and, in 2006, Fondriest, which was founded by former professional cyclist Maurizio Fondriest.

They currently specialize in producing mountain bikes, and also sponsor a professional mountain biking team, the Torpado Factory Team.

== See also ==
- List of bicycle parts
- List of Italian companies
