= Carlo Brugnami =

Italian cyclist

Personal information
- Born: 30 September 1938 Corciano, Italy
- Died: 2 February 2018 (aged 79)

Cycling career
- Sport: Cycling
- Role: Rider

Carlo Brugnami (30 September 1938 – c. 2 February 2018) was an Italian racing cyclist. He finished in ninth place in the 1961 Giro d'Italia. His death was announced on 2 February 2018. He was 79.
