= Cleto Maule =

Italian cyclist (1931–2013)

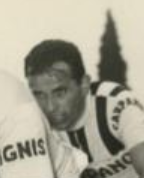

Personal information
- Born: 14 March 1931 Gambellara, Italy
- Died: 28 July 2013 (aged 82) Golfo Aranci, Italy

Cycling career
- Sport: Cycling
- Discipline: Road
- Role: Rider

Cleto Maule (14 March 1931 – 28 July 2013) was an Italian racing cyclist. He won the 1955 edition of the Giro di Lombardia, as well as stage 17 of the 1956 Giro d'Italia and the 1955 Milano–Torino.
