= Diego Ronchini =

Italian cyclist

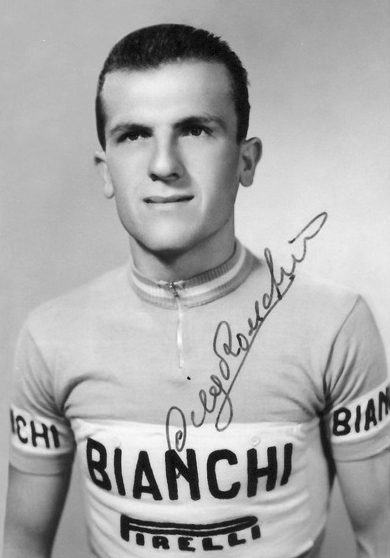

Personal information
- Full name: Diego Ronchini
- Born: 9 December 1935 Imola, Italy
- Died: 18 April 2003 (aged 67) Imola, Italy

Cycling career
- Sport: Cycling
- Discipline: Road
- Role: Rider

Professional teams
- 1956–60: Bianchi
- 1961: Carpano
- 1962: Ghigi
- 1963, 1965–66: Salvarani
- 1964: Cynar-Frejus

Diego Ronchini (9 December 1935 – 18 April 2003) was an Italian road racing cyclist. After winning the Giro di Lombardia as an amateur in 1955 he turned professional and won the same race in 1957, finishing second in 1960. He also won the Giro dell'Emilia in 1958 and 1961, Giro del Lazio in 1959, Trofeo Baracchi and Giro del Veneto in 1960, and Giro della Romagna in 1962, and rode the Tour de France in 1962 and 1965.
