= Adriano Zamboni =

Italian cyclist (1933–2005)

Personal information
- Born: 22 June 1933 Montorio Veronese, Kingdom of Italy
- Died: 13 May 2005 (aged 71) Montorio Veronese, Italy

Cycling career
- Sport: Cycling
- Role: Rider

Adriano Zamboni (22 June 1933 – 13 May 2005) was an Italian racing cyclist. He won stage 16 of the 1961 Giro d'Italia.
