= Gazzola (cycling team) =

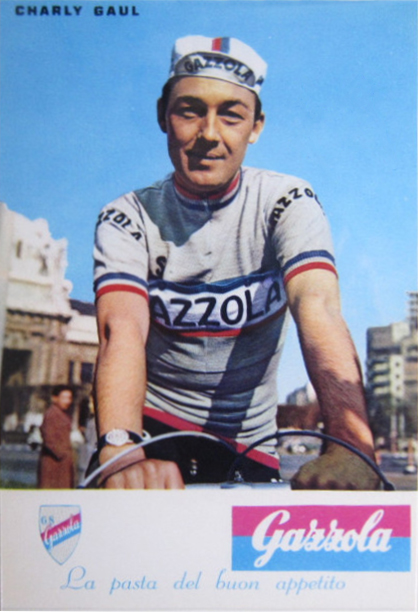
- Charly Gaul c. 1961–1963

Team information
- Registered: Italy
- Founded: 1960
- Disbanded: 1964
- Discipline: Road
- Bicycles: Fiorelli

Team name history
- 1960–1961 1962 1963–1964: Gazzola–Fiorelli; Gazzola–Fiorelli–Hutchinson; Gazzola

Gazzola was an Italian professional cycling team that existed from 1960 to 1964.
