= Philco (cycling team) =

Italian cycling team

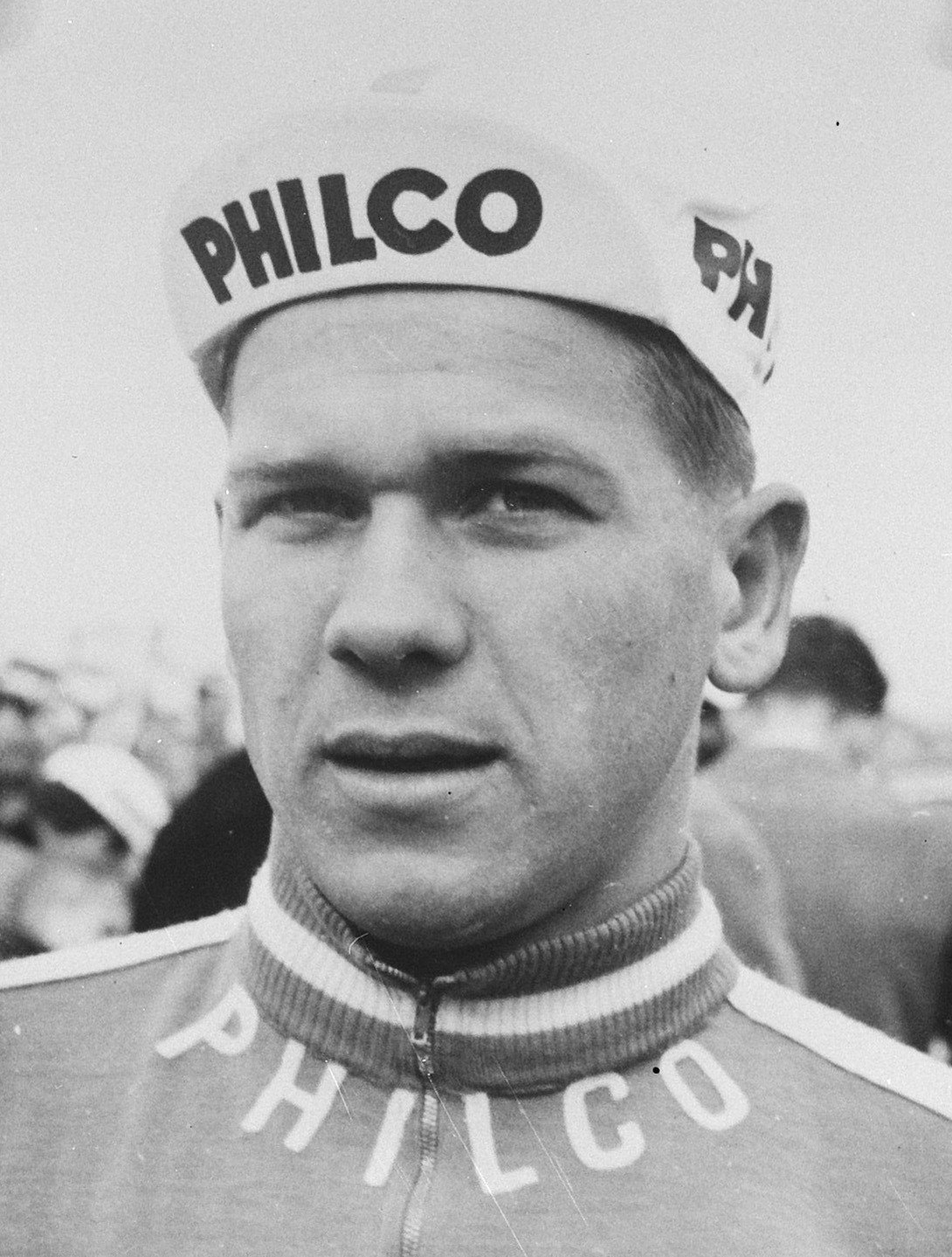
- Emile Daems at the 1962 Tour de France

Team information
- Registered: Italy
- Founded: 1960
- Disbanded: 1962
- Discipline: Road

Team name history
- 1960–1962: Philco

Philco was an Italian professional cycling team that existed from 1960 to 1962.
