= Angelo Conterno =

Italian cyclist

Personal information
- Born: 13 March 1925 Turin, Italy
- Died: 1 December 2007 (aged 82) Turin, Italy

Cycling career
- Sport: Cycling
- Discipline: Road
- Role: Rider

Major wins
- 1956 Vuelta a España

Angelo Conterno (13 March 1925 – 1 December 2007) was an Italian professional road racing cyclist during the 1950s and early 1960s who is most famous for becoming the first Italian to win the Vuelta a España. At the 1956 Vuelta after winning Stage 2 and capturing the golden jersey, Conterno, in one of the closest Vuelta's in history, outlasted Spaniard Jesus Loroño to win the overall title by just 13 seconds. The following year, Loroño won the 1957 Vuelta a España without Conterno in attendance.

Earlier in his career, Conterno wore the pink jersey as leader of the general classification for a day when he won the second stage of the 1952 Giro d'Italia. Beyond his three-stage victories in the Giro d'Italia, he won the 1959 Züri-Metzgete.

== Major achievements ==
1952 – Frejus
5th, Overall, Giro d’Italia

1st, Stage 2, (Abetone - Montecatini Terme, 197 km)
general classification leader (after Stage 2)

1953 – Frejus
5th, Overall, Giro d'Italia
1954 – Frejus
1st, Giro di Lazio
3rd, Giro del Piemonte
10th, Overall, Giro d'Italia

1st, Stage 4, (Catanzaro - Bari, 352 km)

1955 – Torpado
2nd, Giro del Piemonte
3rd, Giro di Lombardia
18th, Overall, Giro d’Italia

1st, Stage 18, (Trieste - Cortina d'Ampezzo, 236 km)

1956
1st, Overall, Vuelta a España

1st, Stage 2, (Santander - Oviedo, 248 km)

41st, Overall, Tour de France
1957
1st, Giro del Veneto
3rd, Giro dell'Emilia
3rd, Tre Valli Varesine
1958
3rd, Tour of Flanders
1959
1st, Züri-Metzgete
3rd, Giro di Lazio
1960
3rd, Tre Valli Varesine
1961
1st, Giro del Piemonte
2nd, Milano–Torino
1963
2nd, Züri-Metzgete
