= Ignis (cycling team) =

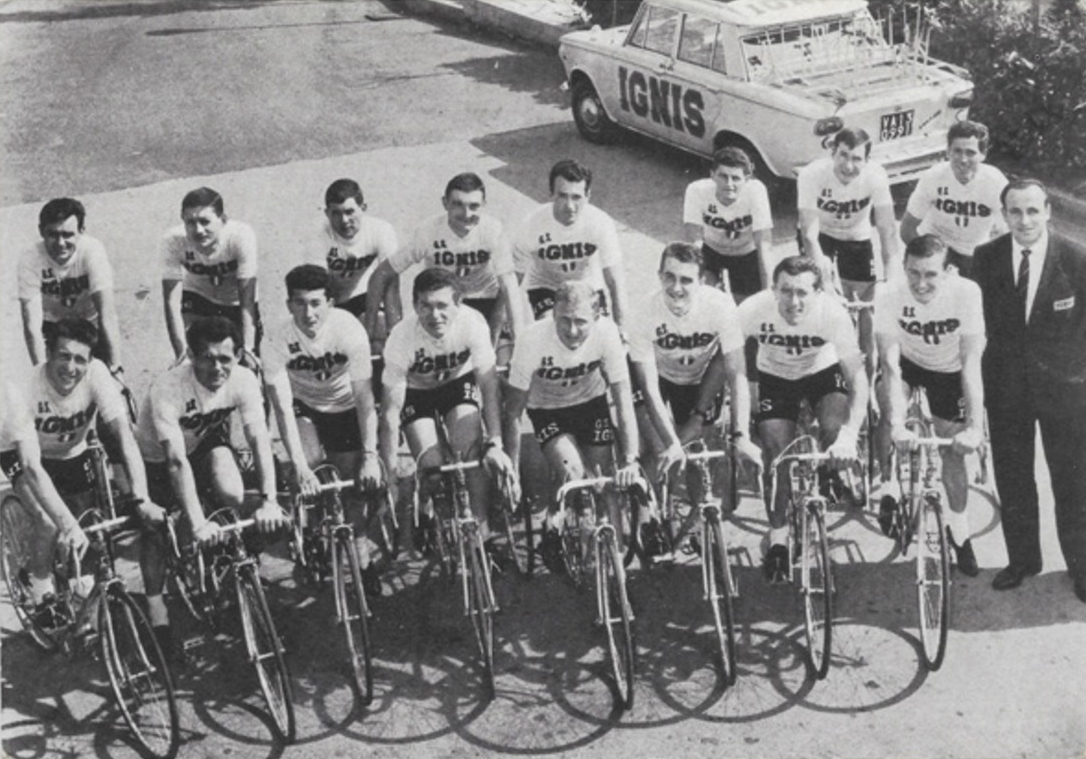
- The Ignis team of 1964

Team information
- Registered: Italy
- Founded: 1955
- Disbanded: 1968
- Discipline: Road

Team name history
- 1954–1955 1956 1957–1958 1959 1960–1961 1962 1963–1968: Ignis; Ignis–Varese; Ignis–Doniselli; Ignis–Frejus; Ignis; Ignis–Moschettieri; Ignis

Ignis was an Italian professional cycling team that existed from 1954 to 1968. Its main sponsor was Italian home appliance maker Ignis. The team won the team classification of the 1960 Giro d'Italia.

== History ==
Already in 1955, before the birth of the Sports Group, Ignis sponsored the Spanish national team competing in the Giro d'Italia; two years later the GS Ignis participated in the Giro d'Italia in association with the Spanish national team, with a team of Spanish cyclists only, led by Miguel Poblet, who won four stages.

From 1958 to 1961, Poblet, now the leader of the Gruppo Sportivo, won another twelve stages of the Giro d'Italia, three in each of the four editions. The 1960 Giro d'Italia also saw Ignis win four more stages (two with Dino Bruni, one with Pierino Baffi and Roberto Falaschi ) and the team classification.
