= Ghigi (cycling team) =

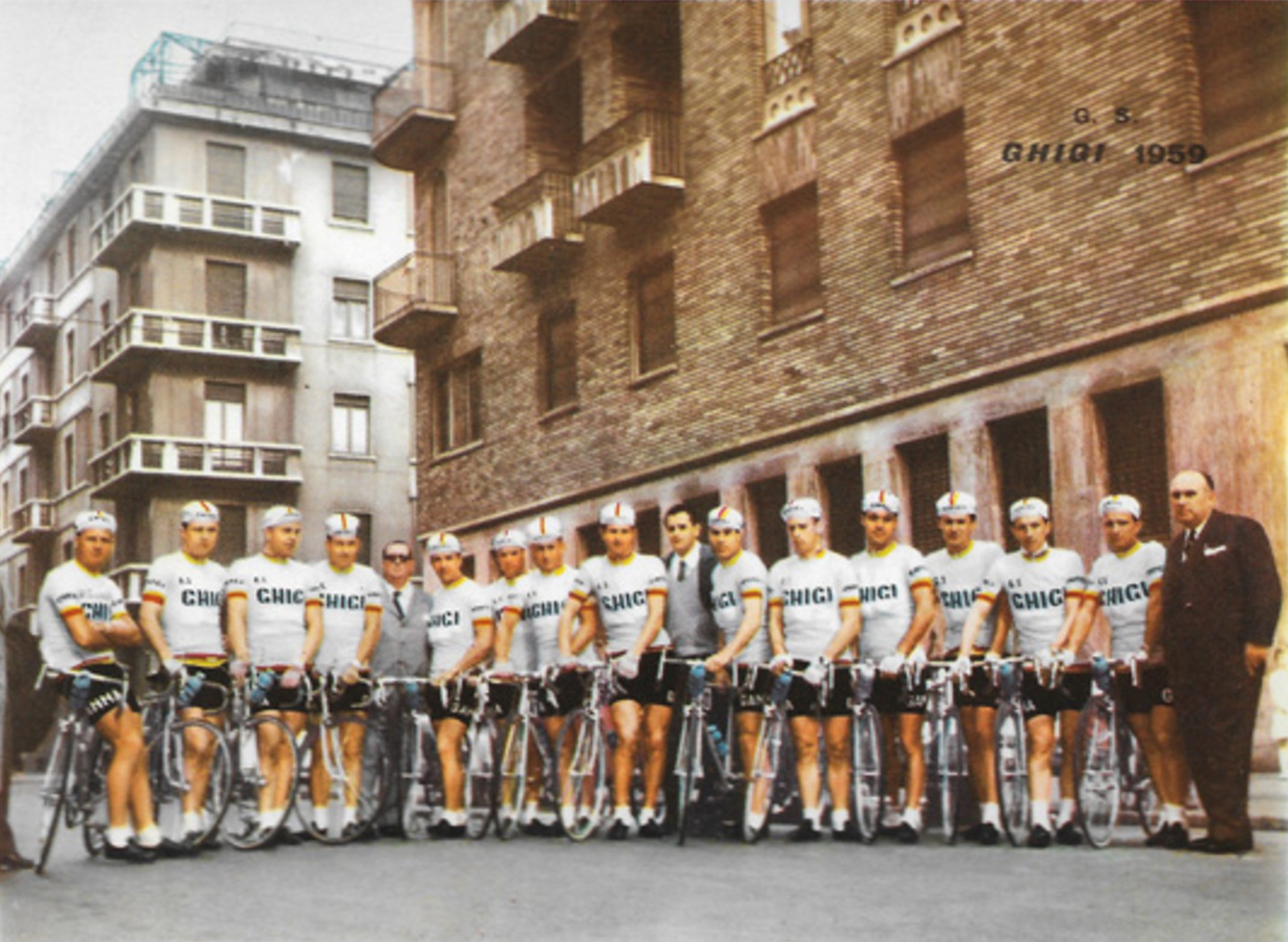
- The Ghigi–Ganna team of 1959

Team information
- Registered: Italy
- Founded: 1958
- Disbanded: 1962
- Discipline: Road
- Bicycles: Coppi (1958); Ganna (1959)

Key personnel
- General manager: Luciano Pezzi (1960–1962)

Team name history
- 1958 1959 1960–1962: Ghigi–Coppi; Ghigi–Ganna; Ghigi

Ghigi was an Italian professional cycling team that existed from 1958 to 1962, leading to the formation of the Salvarani team in 1963. Its main sponsor was Italian pasta manufacturer Ghigi.
