= 1960 Tour de France, Stage 1a to Stage 10 =

Cycling race stages

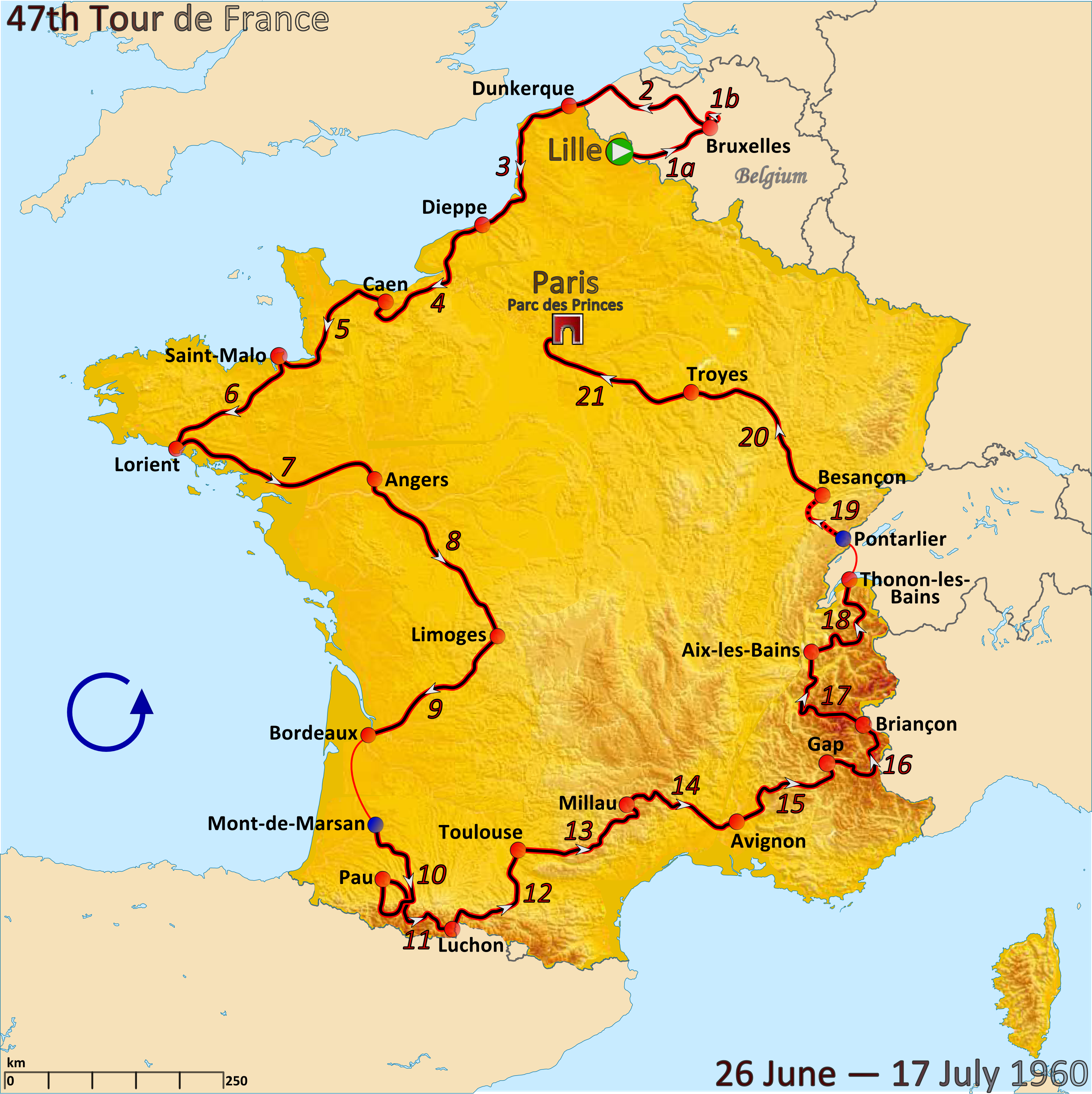
Route of the 1960 Tour de France

The 1960 Tour de France was the 47th edition of Tour de France, one of cycling's Grand Tours. The Tour began in Lille with a flat stage to Brussels on 26 June and Stage 10 occurred on 5 July with a mountainous stage to Pau. The race finished in Paris on 17 July.

== Stage 1a ==
26 June 1960 - Lille to Brussels, 108 km (67.1 mi)

Stage 1a result and General Classification after Stage 1a

	Rider	Team	Time
1	Julien Schepens (BEL)	Belgium	2h 46' 21"
2	Jos Hoevenaers (BEL)	Belgium	s.t.
3	Gastone Nencini (ITA)	Italy	s.t.
4	Martin van der Borgh (NED)	Netherlands	s.t.
5	Wim van Est (NED)	Netherlands	s.t.
6	António Alves Barbosa (POR)	Internationals	s.t.
7	Jef Planckaert (BEL)	Belgium	s.t.
8	Jan Adriaensens (BEL)	Belgium	s.t.
9	François Mahé (FRA)	France	s.t.
10	Joseph Groussard (FRA)	France – West	s.t.

== Stage 1b ==
26 June 1960 - Brussels, 27.8 km (17.3 mi) (individual time trial)

Stage 1b result

Rank	Rider	Team	Time
1	Roger Rivière (FRA)	France	41' 21"
2	Gastone Nencini (ITA)	Italy	+ 32"
=3	Henry Anglade (FRA)	France	+ 48"
=3	Willy Trepp (SUI)	Switzerland-Luxembourg	s.t.
5	Jef Planckaert (BEL)	Belgium	+ 1' 05"
6	Arnaldo Pambianco (ITA)	Italy	+ 1' 06"
7	Wim van Est (NED)	Netherlands	+ 1' 08"
8	Ercole Baldini (ITA)	Italy	+ 1' 11"
9	Tom Simpson (GBR)	Great Britain	+ 1' 23"
10	René Strehler (SUI)	Switzerland-Luxembourg	+ 1' 24"

General classification after stage 1b

Rank	Rider	Team	Time
1	Gastone Nencini (ITA)	Italy	3h 27' 59"
2	Henry Anglade (FRA)	France	+ 31"
3	Jef Planckaert (BEL)	Belgium	+ 48"
4	Wim van Est (NED)	Netherlands	+ 51"
5	Tom Simpson (GBR)	Great Britain	+ 1' 06"
6	Jan Adriaensens (BEL)	Belgium	+ 1' 24"
7	Roger Rivière (FRA)	France	+ 1' 32"
8	António Alves Barbosa (POR)	Internationals	+ 1' 55"
9	Jos Hoevenaers (BEL)	Belgium	+ 2' 03"
10	Martin van der Borgh (NED)	Netherlands	+ 2' 22"

== Stage 2 ==
27 June 1960 - Brussels to Dunkirk, 206 km (128.0 mi)

Stage 2 result

Rank	Rider	Team	Time
1	René Privat (FRA)	France	5h 12' 08"
2	Jean Graczyk (FRA)	France	s.t.
3	Tom Simpson (GBR)	Great Britain	s.t.
4	Aldo Bolzan (LUX)	Switzerland-Luxembourg	s.t.
5	Jean Milesi (FRA)	France – East/South-East	s.t.
6	Raymond Mastrotto (FRA)	France	s.t.
7	Rolf Graf (SUI)	Switerland-Luxembourg	+ 24"
8	Jean Anastasi (FRA)	France – East/South-East	+ 35"
9	René Strehler (SUI)	Switzerland-Luxembourg	+ 38"
10	Manfred Donike (FRG)	Germany	+ 39"

General classification after stage 2

Rank	Rider	Team	Time
1	Gastone Nencini (ITA)	Italy	8h 40' 51"
2	Tom Simpson (GBR)	Great Britain	+ 22"
3	Henry Anglade (FRA)	France	+ 31"
4	Wim van Est (NED)	Netherlands	+ 51"
5	Jan Adriaensens (BEL)	Belgium	+ 1' 24"
6	Roger Rivière (FRA)	France	+ 1' 32"
7	Jef Planckaert (BEL)	Belgium	+ 1' 55"
8	Jos Hoevenaers (BEL)	Belgium	+ 2' 03"
9	Martin van der Borgh (NED)	Netherlands	+ 2' 22"
10	Joseph Groussard (FRA)	France – West	+ 2' 42"

== Stage 3 ==
28 June 1960 - Dunkirk to Dieppe, 209 km (130 mi)

Stage 3 result

Rank	Rider	Team	Time
1	Nino Defilippis (ITA)	Italy	5h 01' 35"
2	Robert Cazala (FRA)	France	s.t.
3	Joseph Groussard (FRA)	France – West	s.t.
4	Bernard Viot (FRA)	France – Paris-North	+ 3"
5	Fernand Picot (FRA)	France – West	+ 7"
6	Hans Jaroszewicz (FRG)	Germany	+ 3' 06"
7	André Darrigade (FRA)	France	+ 3' 07"
8	Jo de Roo (NED)	Netherlands	s.t.
9	Pierino Baffi (ITA)	Italy	s.t.
10	Alfredo Sabbadin (ITA)	Italy	s.t.

General classification after stage 3

Rank	Rider	Team	Time
1	Joseph Groussard (FRA)	France – West	13h 45' 08"
2	Gastone Nencini (ITA)	Italy	+ 25"
3	Tom Simpson (GBR)	Great Britain	+ 47"
4	Henry Anglade (FRA)	France	+ 56"
5	Wim van Est (NED)	Netherlands	+ 1' 16"
6	Jan Adriaensens (BEL)	Belgium	+ 1' 49"
7	Roger Rivière (FRA)	France	+ 1' 57"
8	Jef Planckaert (BEL)	Belgium	+ 2' 20"
9	Martin van der Borgh (NED)	Netherlands	+ 2' 47"
10	Arnaldo Pambianco (ITA)	Italy	+ 3' 33"

== Stage 4 ==
29 June 1960 - Dieppe to Caen, 211 km (131 mi)

Stage 4 result

Rank	Rider	Team	Time
1	Jean Graczyk (FRA)	France	5h 14' 42"
2	Henry Anglade (FRA)	France	s.t.
3	Ercole Baldini (ITA)	Italy	s.t.
4	Yvo Molenaers (BEL)	Belgium	s.t.
5	Wim van Est (NED)	Netherlands	s.t.
6	Eddy Pauwels (BEL)	Belgium	s.t.
7	André Darrigade (FRA)	France	+ 6' 19"
8	Hans Jaroszewicz (FRG)	Germany	s.t.
9	Bernard Viot (FRA)	France – Paris-North	s.t.
10	Jo de Roo (NED)	Netherlands	s.t.

General classification after stage 4

Rank	Rider	Team	Time
1	Henry Anglade (FRA)	France	19h 00' 16"
2	Wim van Est (NED)	Netherlands	+ 50"
3	Ercole Baldini (ITA)	Italy	+ 3' 49"
4	Jean Graczyk (FRA)	France	+ 4' 59"
5	Eddy Pauwels (BEL)	Belgium	+ 5' 33"
6	Joseph Groussard (FRA)	France – West	+ 5' 53"
7	Gastone Nencini (ITA)	Italy	+ 6' 18"
8	Tom Simpson (GBR)	Great Britain	+ 6' 40"
9	Jan Adriaensens (BEL)	Belgium	+ 7' 42"
10	Roger Rivière (FRA)	France	+ 7' 50"

== Stage 5 ==
30 June 1960 - Caen to Saint-Malo, 189 km (117 mi)

Stage 5 result

Rank	Rider	Team	Time
1	André Darrigade (FRA)	France	4h 21' 31"
2	Jean Graczyk (FRA)	France	s.t.
3	Jef Planckaert (BEL)	Belgium	s.t.
4	Jo de Roo (NED)	Netherlands	s.t.
5	Camille Le Menn (FRA)	France – Centre-Midi	s.t.
6	Pierre Beuffeuil (FRA)	France – Centre-Midi	s.t.
7	Nino Defilippis (ITA)	Italy	+ 29"
8	Pierre Ruby (FRA)	France – Centre-Midi	s.t.
9	Jean Gainche (FRA)	France – West	s.t.
10	Félix Lebuhotel (FRA)	France – West	s.t.

General classification after stage 5

Rank	Rider	Team	Time
1	Henry Anglade (FRA)	France	23h 25' 22"
2	Wim van Est (NED)	Netherlands	+ 50"
3	Jean Graczyk (FRA)	France	+ 54"
4	Joseph Groussard (FRA)	France – West	+ 2' 47"
5	Tom Simpson (GBR)	Great Britain	+ 3' 34"
6	Ercole Baldini (ITA)	Italy	+ 3' 49"
7	Jan Adriaensens (BEL)	Belgium	+ 4' 36"
8	Jef Planckaert (BEL)	Belgium	+ 4' 38"
9	Eddy Pauwels (BEL)	Belgium	+ 5' 33"
10	Martin van der Borgh (NED)	Netherlands	+ 5' 34"

== Stage 6 ==
1 July 1960 - Saint-Malo to Lorient, 191 km (119 mi)

Stage 6 result

Rank	Rider	Team	Time
1	Roger Rivière (FRA)	France	4h 20' 10"
2	Gastone Nencini (ITA)	Italy	s.t.
3	Jan Adriaensens (BEL)	Belgium	s.t.
4	Hans Junkermann (FRG)	Germany	s.t.
5	René Strehler (SUI)	Switzerland-Luxembourg	+ 12' 52"
6	Fernando Manzaneque (ESP)	Spain	s.t.
7	Dino Bruni (Italy)	Italy	+ 14' 40"
8	Jean Graczyk (FRA)	France	s.t.
9	Martin Van Geneugden (BEL)	Belgium	s.t.
10	Bernard Viot (FRA)	France – Paris-North	s.t.

General classification after stage 6

Rank	Rider	Team	Time
1	Jan Adriaensens (BEL)	Belgium	27h 50' 08"
2	Gastone Nencini (ITA)	Italy	+ 1' 12"
3	Roger Rivière (FRA)	France	+ 2' 14"
4	Hans Junkermann (FRG)	Germany	+ 6' 00"
5	Henry Anglade (FRA)	France	+ 10' 04"
6	Wim van Est (NED)	Netherlands	+ 10' 54"
7	Jean Graczyk (FRA)	France	+ 10' 58"
8	Joseph Groussard (FRA)	France – West	+ 12' 51"
9	Tom Simpson (GBR)	Great Britain	+ 13' 38"
10	Ercole Baldini (ITA)	Italy	+ 13' 53"

== Stage 7 ==
2 July 1960 - Lorient to Angers, 244 km (152 mi)

Stage 7 result

Rank	Rider	Team	Time
1	Graziano Battistini (ITA)	Italy	6h 00' 24"
2	André Darrigade (FRA)	France	+ 4"
3	Dino Bruni (Italy)	Italy	s.t.
4	Jean Graczyk (FRA)	France	s.t.
5	Jo de Roo (NED)	Netherlands	s.t.
6	Nino Defilippis (ITA)	Italy	s.t.
7	Albertus Geldermans (NED)	Netherlands	s.t.
8	Pierre Beuffeuil (FRA)	France – Centre-Midi	s.t.
9	Joseph Groussard (FRA)	France – West	s.t.
10	Michel Van Aerde (BEL)	Belgium	s.t.

General classification after stage 7

Rank	Rider	Team	Time
1	Jan Adriaensens (BEL)	Belgium	33h 54' 17"
2	Gastone Nencini (ITA)	Italy	+ 1' 12"
3	Roger Rivière (FRA)	France	+ 2' 14"
4	Hans Junkermann (FRG)	Germany	+ 6' 00"
5	Jean Graczyk (FRA)	France	+ 7' 17"
6	Joseph Groussard (FRA)	France – West	+ 9' 10"
7	Henry Anglade (FRA)	France	+ 10' 04"
8	Wim van Est (NED)	Netherlands	+ 10' 54"
9	Jef Planckaert (BEL)	Belgium	+ 11' 01"
10	André Darrigade (FRA)	France	+ 12' 24"

== Stage 8 ==
3 July 1960 - Angers to Limoges, 240 km (150 mi)

Stage 8 result

Rank	Rider	Team	Time
1	Nino Defilippis (ITA)	Italy	5h 50' 59"
2	Graziano Battistini (ITA)	Italy	s.t.
3	Arnaldo Pambianco (ITA)	Italy	+ 11"
4	Bernard Viot (FRA)	France – Paris-North	s.t.
5	Pierre Everaert (FRA)	France	s.t.
6	Jean Milesi (FRA)	France – East/South-East	s.t.
7	François Mahé (FRA)	France	s.t.
8	Manuel Rohrbach (FRA)	France – Centre-Midi	s.t.
9	Raymond Mastrotto (FRA)	France	s.t.
10	Robert Cazala (FRA)	France	+ 3' 58"

General classification after stage 8

Rank	Rider	Team	Time
1	Jan Adriaensens (BEL)	Belgium	39h 54' 26"
2	Gastone Nencini (ITA)	Italy	+ 1' 12"
3	Roger Rivière (FRA)	France	+ 2' 14"
4	Jean Milesi (FRA)	France – East/South-East	+ 5' 09"
5	Jef Planckaert (BEL)	Belgium	+ 5' 49"
6	Hans Junkermann (FRG)	Germany	+ 6' 00"
7	André Darrigade (FRA)	France	+ 7' 12"
8	Jean Graczyk (FRA)	France	+ 7' 17"
9	Graziano Battistini (ITA)	Italy	+ 8' 09"
10	Manuel Rohrbach (FRA)	France – Centre-Midi	+ 8' 51"

== Stage 9 ==
4 July 1960 - Limoges to Bordeaux, 225 km (140 mi)

Stage 9 result

Rank	Rider	Team	Time
1	Martin Van Geneugden (BEL)	Belgium	5h 38' 35"
2	Jean Graczyk (FRA)	France	s.t.
3	Pierre Beuffeuil (FRA)	France – Centre-Midi	s.t.
4	Martin van der Borgh (NED)	Netherlands	+ 4' 08"
5	Antonio Suárez (ESP)	Spain	+ 4' 25"
6	Coen Niesten (NED)	Netherlands	+ 4' 29"
7	André Darrigade (FRA)	France	+ 4' 32"
8	Hans Jaroszewicz (FRG)	Germany	s.t.
9	Manfred Donike (FRG)	Germany	s.t.
10	Jean Gainche (FRA)	France – West	s.t.

General classification after stage 9

Rank	Rider	Team	Time
1	Jan Adriaensens (BEL)	Belgium	45h 37' 33"
2	Gastone Nencini (ITA)	Italy	+ 1' 12"
3	Roger Rivière (FRA)	France	+ 2' 14"
4	Jean Graczyk (FRA)	France	+ 2' 15"
5	Pierre Beuffeuil (FRA)	France – Centre-Midi	+ 4' 23"
6	Jean Milesi (FRA)	France – East/South-East	+ 5' 09"
7	Jef Planckaert (BEL)	Belgium	+ 5' 49"
8	Hans Junkermann (FRG)	Germany	+ 6' 00"
9	André Darrigade (FRA)	France	+ 7' 12"
10	Graziano Battistini (ITA)	Italy	+ 8' 09"

== Stage 10 ==
5 July 1960 - Mont-de-Marsan to Pau, 228 km (142 mi)

Stage 10 result

Rank	Rider	Team	Time
1	Roger Rivière (FRA)	France	6h 38' 48"
2	Gastone Nencini (ITA)	Italy	s.t.
3	Graziano Battistini (ITA)	Italy	s.t.
4	Fernando Manzaneque (ESP)	Spain	s.t.
5	Louis Rostollan (FRA)	France	s.t.
6	Albertus Geldermans (NED)	Netherlands	+ 1' 56"
7	Imerio Massignan (ITA)	Italy	+ 1' 58"
8	Édouard Delberghe (FRA)	France	+ 2' 01"
9	Coen Niesten (NED)	Netherlands	s.t.
10	Piet Damen (NED)	Netherlands	s.t.

General classification after stage 10

Rank	Rider	Team	Time
1	Gastone Nencini (ITA)	Italy	52h 17' 03"
2	Roger Rivière (FRA)	France	+ 32"
3	Jan Adriaensens (BEL)	Belgium	+ 1' 19"
4	Jef Planckaert (BEL)	Belgium	+ 7' 08"
5	Hans Junkermann (FRG)	Germany	+ 7' 19"
6	Graziano Battistini (ITA)	Italy	+ 7' 27"
7	Manuel Rohrbach (FRA)	France – Centre-Midi	+ 10' 10"
8	Henry Anglade (FRA)	France	+ 11' 23"
9	Jean Graczyk (FRA)	France	+ 11' 41"
10	Arnaldo Pambianco (ITA)	Italy	+ 11' 50"
