= 1960 Tour de France, Stage 11 to Stage 21 =

Cycling race stages

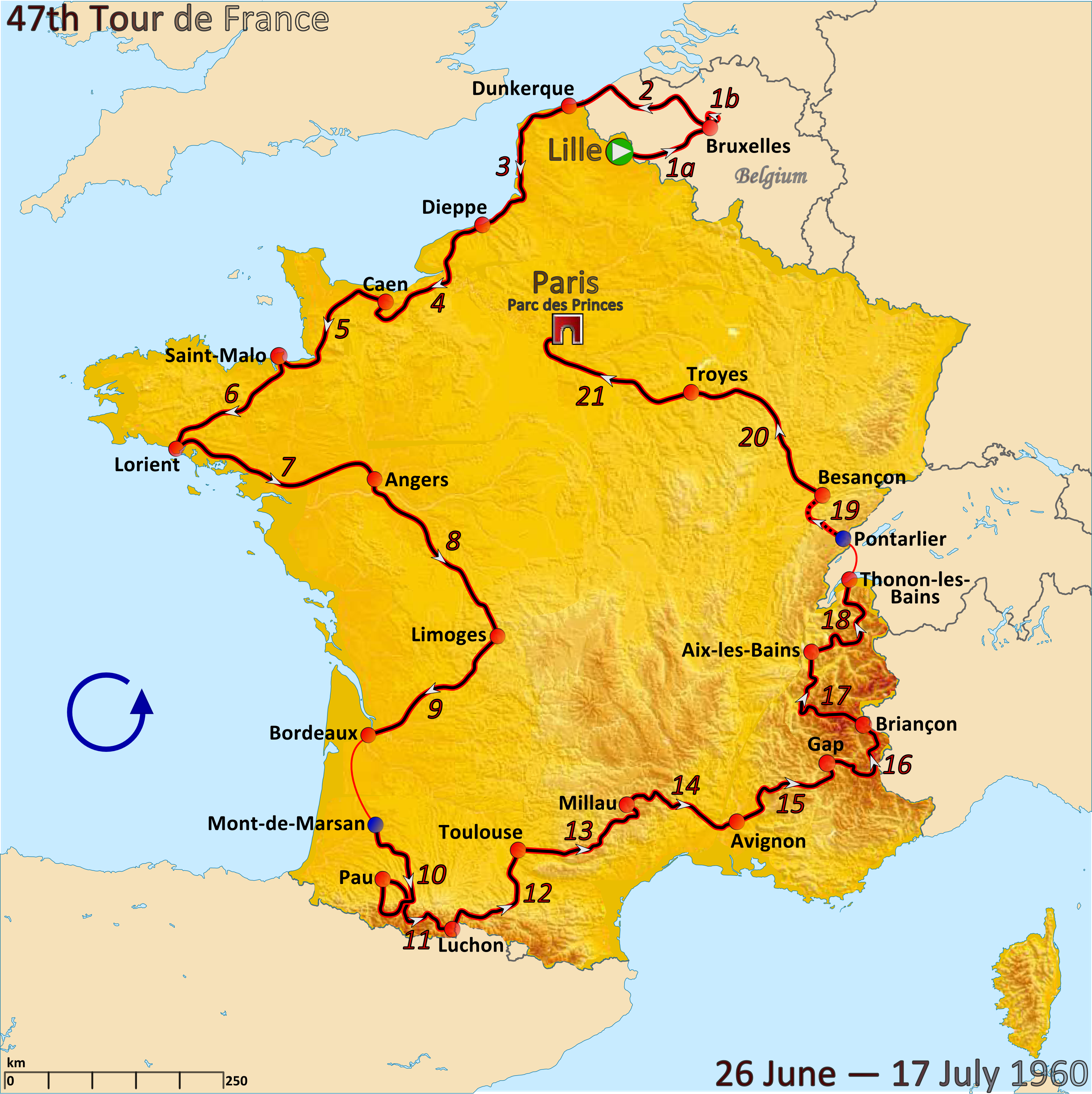
Route of the 1960 Tour de France

The 1960 Tour de France was the 47th edition of Tour de France, one of cycling's Grand Tours. The Tour began in Lille with a flat stage to Brussels on 26 June and Stage 11 occurred on 6 July with a mountainous stage from Pau. The race finished in Paris on 17 July.

== Stage 11 ==
6 July 1960 - Pau to Luchon, 161 km (100.0 mi)

Stage 11 result

Rank	Rider	Team	Time
1	Kurt Gimmi (SUI)	Switzerland-Luxembourg	5h 04' 10"
2	Arnaldo Pambianco (ITA)	Italy	+ 1' 51"
3	Édouard Delberghe (FRA)	France	+ 2' 26"
4	Gastone Nencini (ITA)	Italy	+ 2' 27"
5	Martin van der Borgh (NED)	Netherlands	+ 3' 13"
6	Graziano Battistini (ITA)	Italy	+ 3' 33"
7	Hans Junkermann (FRG)	Germany	s.t.
8	Jan Adriaensens (BEL)	Belgium	s.t.
9	Manuel Rohrbach (FRA)	France – Centre-Midi	s.t.
10	Jef Planckaert (BEL)	Belgium	s.t.

General classification after stage 11

Rank	Rider	Team	Time
1	Gastone Nencini (ITA)	Italy	57h 23' 40"
2	Roger Rivière (FRA)	France	+ 1' 38"
3	Jan Adriaensens (BEL)	Belgium	+ 2' 25"
4	Jef Planckaert (BEL)	Belgium	+ 8' 14"
5	Hans Junkermann (FRG)	Germany	+ 8' 25"
6	Graziano Battistini (ITA)	Italy	+ 8' 33"
7	Arnaldo Pambianco (ITA)	Italy	+ 10' 44"
8	Manuel Rohrbach (FRA)	France – Centre-Midi	+ 11' 16"
9	Henry Anglade (FRA)	France	+ 12' 29"
10	François Mahé (FRA)	France	+ 14' 23"

== Stage 12 ==
7 July 1960 - Luchon to Toulouse, 176 km (109.4 mi)

Stage 12 result

Rank	Rider	Team	Time
1	Jean Graczyk (FRA)	France	4h 37' 52"
2	Michel Van Aerde (BEL)	Belgium	s.t.
3	Nino Defilippis (ITA)	Italy	s.t.
4	Albertus Geldermans (NED)	Netherlands	s.t.
5	Dino Bruni (Italy)	Italy	s.t.
6	Gastone Nencini (ITA)	Italy	s.t.
7	André Darrigade (FRA)	France	s.t.
8	Piet Damen (NED)	Netherlands	s.t.
9	Jef Planckaert (BEL)	Belgium	s.t.
10	Rolf Graf (SUI)	Switzerland-Luxembourg	s.t.

General classification after stage 12

Rank	Rider	Team	Time
1	Gastone Nencini (ITA)	Italy	62h 01' 32"
2	Roger Rivière (FRA)	France	+ 1' 38"
3	Jan Adriaensens (BEL)	Belgium	+ 2' 25"
4	Jef Planckaert (BEL)	Belgium	+ 8' 14"
5	Hans Junkermann (FRG)	Germany	+ 8' 25"
6	Graziano Battistini (ITA)	Italy	+ 8' 33"
7	Arnaldo Pambianco (ITA)	Italy	+ 10' 44"
8	Manuel Rohrbach (FRA)	France – Centre-Midi	+ 11' 16"
9	Henry Anglade (FRA)	France	+ 12' 29"
10	François Mahé (FRA)	France	+ 14' 23"

== Stage 13 ==
8 July 1960 - Toulouse to Millau, 224 km (139 mi)

Stage 13 result

Rank	Rider	Team	Time
1	Louis Proost (BEL)	Belgium	5h 58' 31"
2	Pierre Everaert (FRA)	France	s.t.
3	Roberto Falaschi (ITA)	Italy	s.t.
4	Robert Cazala (FRA)	France	s.t.
5	Fernando Manzaneque (ESP)	Spain	s.t.
6	Graziano Battistini (ITA)	Italy	+ 13"
7	Jean Graczyk (FRA)	France	+ 2' 26"
8	André Darrigade (FRA)	France	+ 2' 46"
9	Albertus Geldermans (NED)	Netherlands	s.t.
10	Michel Van Aerde (BEL)	Belgium	s.t.

General classification after stage 13

Rank	Rider	Team	Time
1	Gastone Nencini (ITA)	Italy	68h 02' 49"
2	Roger Rivière (FRA)	France	+ 1' 38"
3	Jan Adriaensens (BEL)	Belgium	+ 2' 25"
4	Graziano Battistini (ITA)	Italy	+ 6' 00"
5	Jef Planckaert (BEL)	Belgium	+ 8' 14"
6	Hans Junkermann (FRG)	Germany	+ 8' 25"
7	Arnaldo Pambianco (ITA)	Italy	+ 10' 44"
8	Manuel Rohrbach (FRA)	France – Centre-Midi	+ 11' 16"
9	Henry Anglade (FRA)	France	+ 12' 29"
10	François Mahé (FRA)	France	+ 14' 23"

== Rest Day ==
9 July 1960 - Millau

== Stage 14 ==
10 July 1960 - Millau to Avignon, 217 km (135 mi)

Stage 14 result

Rank	Rider	Team	Time
1	Martin Van Geneugden (BEL)	Belgium	5h 50' 35"
2	André Darrigade (FRA)	France	s.t.
3	Jean Graczyk (FRA)	France	s.t.
4	Bernard Viot (FRA)	France – Paris-North	s.t.
5	Gastone Nencini (ITA)	Italy	s.t.
6	Fernand Picot (FRA)	France – West	s.t.
7	Albertus Geldermans (NED)	Netherlands	s.t.
8	Jef Planckaert (BEL)	Belgium	s.t.
9	Pierre Beuffeuil (FRA)	France – Centre-Midi	s.t.
10	Brian Robinson (GBR)	Great Britain	s.t.

General classification after stage 14

Rank	Rider	Team	Time
1	Gastone Nencini (ITA)	Italy	68h 02' 49"
2	Jan Adriaensens (BEL)	Belgium	+ 2' 25"
3	Graziano Battistini (ITA)	Italy	+ 6' 00"
4	Jef Planckaert (BEL)	Belgium	+ 8' 14"
5	Hans Junkermann (FRG)	Germany	+ 8' 25"
6	Arnaldo Pambianco (ITA)	Italy	+ 10' 44"
7	Manuel Rohrbach (FRA)	France – Centre-Midi	+ 11' 16"
8	Henry Anglade (FRA)	France	+ 12' 29"
9	François Mahé (FRA)	France	+ 14' 23"
10	Raymond Mastrotto (FRA)	France	+ 15' 07"

== Stage 15 ==
11 July 1960 - Avignon to Gap, 187 km (116 mi)

Stage 15 result

Rank	Rider	Team	Time
1	Michel Van Aerde (BEL)	Belgium	5h 15' 15"
2	Martin van der Borgh (NED)	Netherlands	s.t.
3	Tom Simpson (GBR)	Great Britain	+ 4"
4	Louis Rostollan (FRA)	France	+ 5"
5	Bernard Viot (FRA)	France – Paris-North	+ 24"
6	Albertus Geldermans (NED)	Netherlands	+ 1' 42"
7	André Darrigade (FRA)	France	+ 1' 44"
8	Pierre Beuffeuil (FRA)	France – Centre-Midi	s.t.
9	Piet Damen (NED)	Netherlands	s.t.
10	Vittorio Casatti (ITA)	Italy	s.t.

General classification after stage 15

Rank	Rider	Team	Time
1	Gastone Nencini (ITA)	Italy	79h 10' 23"
2	Jan Adriaensens (BEL)	Belgium	+ 2' 25"
3	Graziano Battistini (ITA)	Italy	+ 6' 00"
4	Jef Planckaert (BEL)	Belgium	+ 8' 14"
5	Hans Junkermann (FRG)	Germany	+ 8' 25"
6	Manuel Rohrbach (FRA)	France – Centre-Midi	+ 11' 16"
7	Arnaldo Pambianco (ITA)	Italy	+ 12' 08"
8	Henry Anglade (FRA)	France	+ 12' 29"
9	François Mahé (FRA)	France	+ 14' 23"
10	Raymond Mastrotto (FRA)	France	+ 15' 07"

== Stage 16 ==
12 July 1960 - Gap to Briançon, 172 km (107 mi)

Route:

Stage 16 result

Rank	Rider	Team	Time
1	Graziano Battistini (ITA)	Italy	5h 29' 09"
2	Imerio Massignan (ITA)	Italy	+ 1"
3	Jef Planckaert (BEL)	Belgium	+ 26"
4	Manuel Rohrbach (FRA)	France – Centre-Midi	+ 27"
5	Hans Junkermann (FRG)	Germany	s.t.
6	Gastone Nencini (ITA)	Italy	s.t.
7	Arnaldo Pambianco (ITA)	Italy	s.t.
8	Édouard Delberghe (FRA)	France	+ 1' 27"
9	Jan Adriaensens (BEL)	Belgium	s.t.
10	René Pavard (FRA)	France	+ 1' 31"

General classification after stage 16

Rank	Rider	Team	Time
1	Gastone Nencini (ITA)	Italy	84h 39' 59"
2	Jan Adriaensens (BEL)	Belgium	+ 3' 25"
3	Graziano Battistini (ITA)	Italy	+ 4' 33"
4	Jef Planckaert (BEL)	Belgium	+ 8' 13"
5	Hans Junkermann (FRG)	Germany	+ 8' 25"
6	Manuel Rohrbach (FRA)	France – Centre-Midi	+ 11' 16"
7	Arnaldo Pambianco (ITA)	Italy	+ 12' 08"
8	Henry Anglade (FRA)	France	+ 15' 35"
9	Imerio Massignan (ITA)	Italy	+ 16' 40"
10	Raymond Mastrotto (FRA)	France	+ 17' 10"

== Stage 17 ==
13 July 1960 - Briançon to Aix-les-Bains, 229 km (142 mi)

Stage 17 result

Rank	Rider	Team	Time
1	Jean Graczyk (FRA)	France	7h 30' 20"
2	Graziano Battistini (ITA)	Italy	s.t.
3	Joseph Wasko (FRA)	France – Paris-North	s.t.
4	Kurt Gimmi (SUI)	Switzerland-Luxembourg	s.t.
5	Gastone Nencini (ITA)	Italy	s.t.
6	Imerio Massignan (ITA)	Italy	s.t.
7	Hans Junkermann (FRG)	Germany	s.t.
8	Carmelo Morales Erostarbe (ESP)	Spain	s.t.
9	Henry Anglade (FRA)	France	s.t.
10	Raymond Mastrotto (FRA)	France	s.t.

General classification after stage 17

Rank	Rider	Team	Time
1	Gastone Nencini (ITA)	Italy	92h 10' 19"
2	Graziano Battistini (ITA)	Italy	+ 4' 03"
3	Jan Adriaensens (BEL)	Belgium	+ 5' 47"
4	Hans Junkermann (FRG)	Germany	+ 8' 25"
5	Jef Planckaert (BEL)	Belgium	+ 11' 13"
6	Manuel Rohrbach (FRA)	France – Centre-Midi	+ 14' 16"
7	Arnaldo Pambianco (ITA)	Italy	+ 14' 30"
8	Henry Anglade (FRA)	France	+ 15' 35"
9	Imerio Massignan (ITA)	Italy	+ 16' 40"
10	Raymond Mastrotto (FRA)	France	+ 17' 10"

== Stage 18 ==
14 July 1960 - Aix-les-Bains to Thonon-les-Bains, 215 km (134 mi)

Route:

Stage 18 result

Rank	Rider	Team	Time
1	Fernando Manzaneque (ESP)	Spain	6h 29' 10"
2	Jean Graczyk (FRA)	France	+ 12' 57"
3	Félix Lebuhotel (FRA)	France – West	s.t.
4	Dino Bruni (Italy)	Italy	s.t.
5	René Strehler (SUI)	Switzerland-Luxembourg	s.t.
6	Pierre Ruby (FRA)	France – Centre-Midi	s.t.
7	Jaap Kersten (NED)	Netherlands	s.t.
8	Piet van Est (NED)	Netherlands	s.t.
9	Martin van der Borgh (NED)	Netherlands	s.t.
10	Pierre Everaert (FRA)	France	s.t.

General classification after stage 18

Rank	Rider	Team	Time
1	Gastone Nencini (ITA)	Italy	98h 52' 26"
2	Graziano Battistini (ITA)	Italy	+ 4' 03"
3	Jan Adriaensens (BEL)	Belgium	+ 5' 47"
4	Hans Junkermann (FRG)	Germany	+ 8' 25"
5	Jef Planckaert (BEL)	Belgium	+ 11' 13"
6	Manuel Rohrbach (FRA)	France – Centre-Midi	+ 14' 16"
7	Arnaldo Pambianco (ITA)	Italy	+ 14' 30"
8	Henry Anglade (FRA)	France	+ 15' 35"
9	Imerio Massignan (ITA)	Italy	+ 16' 40"
10	Raymond Mastrotto (FRA)	France	+ 17' 10"

== Stage 19 ==
15 July 1960 - Pontarlier to Besançon, 83 km (52 mi) (individual time trial)

Stage 19 result

Rank	Rider	Team	Time
1	Rolf Graf (SUI)	Switzerland-Luxembourg	1h 59' 28"
2	Raymond Mastrotto (FRA)	France	+ 2' 23"
3	Gastone Nencini (ITA)	Italy	+ 2' 51"
4	Jesús Loroño (ESP)	Spain	+ 3' 44"
5	Graziano Battistini (ITA)	Italy	+ 3' 50"
6	Ercole Baldini (ITA)	Italy	+ 4' 00"
7	Antonio Suárez (ESP)	Spain	+ 4' 05"
8	Camille Le Menn (FRA)	France – Centre-Midi	+ 4' 36"
9	Albertus Geldermans (NED)	Netherlands	+ 4' 42"
10	Jef Planckaert (BEL)	Belgium	+ 4' 43"

General classification after stage 19

Rank	Rider	Team	Time
1	Gastone Nencini (ITA)	Italy	100h 54' 45"
2	Graziano Battistini (ITA)	Italy	+ 5' 02"
3	Jan Adriaensens (BEL)	Belgium	+ 10' 04"
4	Hans Junkermann (FRG)	Germany	+ 11' 21"
5	Jef Planckaert (BEL)	Belgium	+ 13' 05"
6	Raymond Mastrotto (FRA)	France	+ 16' 12"
7	Arnaldo Pambianco (ITA)	Italy	+ 17' 58"
8	Henry Anglade (FRA)	France	+ 19' 17"
9	Manuel Rohrbach (FRA)	France – Centre-Midi	+ 20' 02"
10	Imerio Massignan (ITA)	Italy	+ 23' 28"

== Stage 20 ==
16 July 1960 - Besançon to Troyes, 229 km (142 mi)

Stage 20 result

Rank	Rider	Team	Time
1	Pierre Beuffeuil (FRA)	France – Centre-Midi	5h 52' 25"
2	Félix Lebuhotel (FRA)	France – West	+ 49"
3	Dino Bruni (Italy)	Italy	+ 50"
4	Jean Graczyk (FRA)	France	s.t.
5	Jaap Kersten (NED)	Netherlands	s.t.
6	Yvo Molenaers (BEL)	Belgium	s.t.
7	Rolf Graf (SUI)	Switzerland-Luxembourg	s.t.
8	Wim van Est (NED)	Netherlands	s.t.
9	Antonio Suárez (ESP)	Spain	s.t.
10	Pierre Ruby (FRA)	France – Centre-Midi	s.t.

General classification after stage 20

Rank	Rider	Team	Time
1	Gastone Nencini (ITA)	Italy	106h 49' 12"
2	Graziano Battistini (ITA)	Italy	+ 5' 02"
3	Jan Adriaensens (BEL)	Belgium	+ 10' 24"
4	Hans Junkermann (FRG)	Germany	+ 11' 21"
5	Jef Planckaert (BEL)	Belgium	+ 13' 05"
6	Raymond Mastrotto (FRA)	France	+ 16' 12"
7	Arnaldo Pambianco (ITA)	Italy	+ 17' 58"
8	Henry Anglade (FRA)	France	+ 19' 17"
9	Manuel Rohrbach (FRA)	France – Centre-Midi	+ 20' 02"
10	Imerio Massignan (ITA)	Italy	+ 23' 28"

== Stage 21 ==
17 July 1960 - Troyes to Paris, 200 km (120 mi)

Stage 21 result

Rank	Rider	Team	Time
1	Jean Graczyk (FRA)	France	5h 19' 30"
2	Dino Bruni (Italy)	Italy	s.t.
3	Bernard Viot (FRA)	France – Paris-North	s.t.
4	Michel Van Aerde (BEL)	Belgium	s.t.
5	Wim van Est (NED)	Netherlands	s.t.
6	Piet van Est (NED)	Netherlands	s.t.
7	Pierre Everaert (FRA)	France	s.t.
8	Jaap Kersten (NED)	Netherlands	s.t.
9	Jean Gainche (FRA)	France – West	s.t.
10	Camille Le Menn (FRA)	France – Centre-Midi	s.t.

General classification after stage 21

Rank	Rider	Team	Time
1	Gastone Nencini (ITA)	Italy	112h 08' 42"
2	Graziano Battistini (ITA)	Italy	+ 5' 02"
3	Jan Adriaensens (BEL)	Belgium	+ 10' 24"
4	Hans Junkermann (FRG)	Germany	+ 11' 21"
5	Jef Planckaert (BEL)	Belgium	+ 13' 02"
6	Raymond Mastrotto (FRA)	France	+ 16' 12"
7	Arnaldo Pambianco (ITA)	Italy	+ 17' 58"
8	Henry Anglade (FRA)	France	+ 19' 17"
9	Manuel Rohrbach (FRA)	France – Centre-Midi	+ 20' 02"
10	Imerio Massignan (ITA)	Italy	+ 23' 28"
