= 1960 Tour de France =

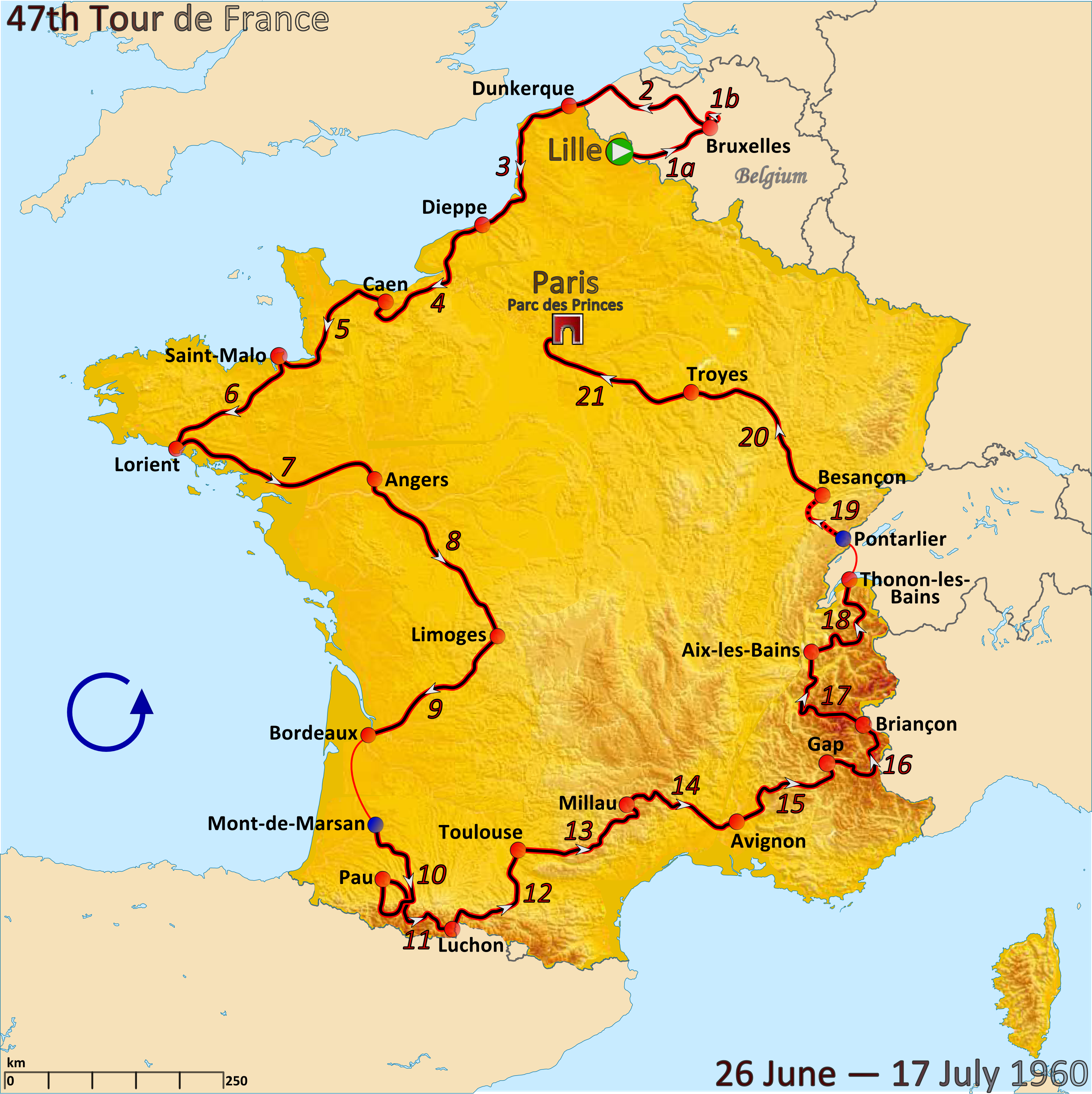
- Route of the 1960 Tour de France followed counterlockwise, starting in Lille and finishing in Paris

Race details
- Dates: 26 June – 17 July 1960
- Stages: 21, including one split stages
- Distance: 4,173 km (2,593 mi)
- Winning time: 112h 08' 42"

Results
Jersey awarded to the overall winner	Winner	Gastone Nencini (ITA)	(Italy)
	Second	Graziano Battistini (ITA)	(Italy)
	Third	Jan Adriaensens (BEL)	(Belgium)
Jersey awarded to the points classification winner	Points	Jean Graczyk (FRA)	(France)
	Mountains	Imerio Massignan (ITA)	(Italy)
	Combativity	Jean Graczyk (FRA)	(France)
	Team	France	

The 1960 Tour de France was the 47th edition of the Tour de France, one of cycling's Grand Tours. It took place between 26 June and 17 July, with 21 stages covering a distance of 4,173 km (2,593 mi). The race featured 128 riders, of which 81 finished, and was won by the Italian Gastone Nencini.

Because Jacques Anquetil was absent after winning the 1960 Giro d'Italia, Roger Rivière became the main favourite. Halfway the race, Rivière was in second place behind Nencini, and with his specialty the time trial remaining, he was still favourite for the victory. When Rivière had a career-ending crash in the fourteenth stage, this changed, and Nencini won the Tour easily.

== Teams ==
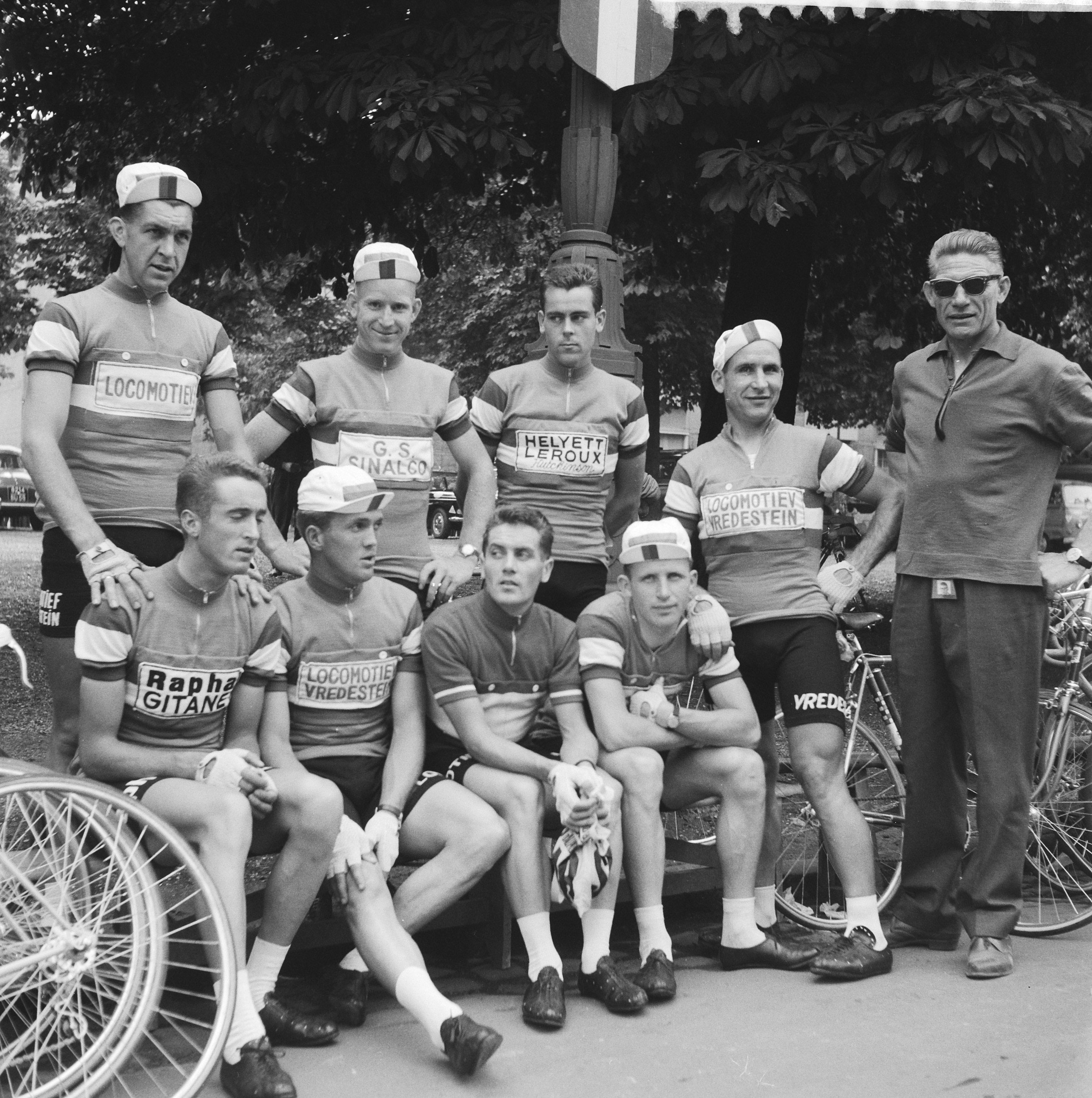
The Dutch team of 1960 Tour

The 1960 Tour de France was run in the national team format. The four most important cycling nations of the time, Spain, Belgium, France and Italy, each sent a national team with fourteen cyclists. There were also five smaller national teams: a combined Luxembourg/Swiss team, a Dutch team, a West German team, a British team, and a team of Internationals cyclists, all with eight cyclists. Finally, there were five regional teams, also of eight cyclists each. Altogether, 128 cyclists started the race. The West German team, that had been away from the Tour since 1938, was allowed to join again.

The teams entering the race were:

- Spain
- Belgium
- France
- Italy
- Switzerland/Luxembourg
- Netherlands
- West Germany
- Internationals
- Great Britain
- West
- East/South-East
- Paris/North
- Centre-Midi

== Pre-race favourites ==
Jacques Anquetil, the winner of the 1957 Tour de France, had won the 1960 Giro d'Italia earlier that year. Anquetil was tired, and skipped the Tour. This made Roger Rivière the French team leader, and the big favourite for the Tour victory.

== Route and stages ==
The 1960 Tour de France started on 26 June in Mulhouse, and had one rest day, in Millau. In previous years, the location of the stage finish and the next stage start had always been close together. In 1960, this changed, when cyclists had to take the train to get from Bordeaux to Mont de Marsan after the ninth stage. The highest point of elevation in the race was 2,360 m (7,740 ft) at the summit of the Col d'Izoard mountain pass on stage 16.

Stage characteristics and winners
Stage	Date	Course	Distance	Type	Winner
1a	26 June	Lille to Brussels (Belgium)	108 km (67 mi)	Plain stage	Julien Schepens (BEL)
1b	26 June	Brussels (Belgium)	27.8 km (17.3 mi)	Individual time trial	Roger Rivière (FRA)
2	27 June	Brussels (Belgium) to Dunkirk	206 km (128 mi)	Plain stage	René Privat (FRA)
3	28 June	Dunkirk to Dieppe	209 km (130 mi)	Plain stage	Nino Defilippis (ITA)
4	29 June	Dieppe to Caen	211 km (131 mi)	Plain stage	Jean Graczyk (FRA)
5	30 June	Caen to Saint-Malo	189 km (117 mi)	Plain stage	André Darrigade (FRA)
6	1 July	Saint-Malo to Lorient	191 km (119 mi)	Plain stage	Roger Rivière (FRA)
7	2 July	Lorient to Angers	244 km (152 mi)	Plain stage	Graziano Battistini (ITA)
8	3 July	Angers to Limoges	240 km (150 mi)	Plain stage	Nino Defilippis (ITA)
9	4 July	Limoges to Bordeaux	225 km (140 mi)	Plain stage	Martin van Geneugden (BEL)
10	5 July	Mont-de-Marsan to Pau	228 km (142 mi)	Stage with mountain(s)	Roger Rivière (FRA)
11	6 July	Pau to Luchon	161 km (100 mi)	Stage with mountain(s)	Kurt Gimmi (SUI)
12	7 July	Luchon to Toulouse	176 km (109 mi)	Stage with mountain(s)	Jean Graczyk (FRA)
13	8 July	Toulouse to Millau	224 km (139 mi)	Plain stage	Louis Proost (BEL)
	9 July	Millau		Rest day	
14	10 July	Millau to Avignon	217 km (135 mi)	Stage with mountain(s)	Martin van Geneugden (BEL)
15	11 July	Avignon to Gap	187 km (116 mi)	Stage with mountain(s)	Michel Van Aerde (BEL)
16	12 July	Gap to Briançon	172 km (107 mi)	Stage with mountain(s)	Graziano Battistini (ITA)
17	13 July	Briançon to Aix-les-Bains	229 km (142 mi)	Stage with mountain(s)	Jean Graczyk (FRA)
18	14 July	Aix-les-Bains to Thonon-les-Bains	215 km (134 mi)	Stage with mountain(s)	Fernando Manzaneque (ESP)
19	15 July	Pontarlier to Besançon	83 km (52 mi)	Individual time trial	Rolf Graf (SUI)
20	16 July	Besançon to Troyes	229 km (142 mi)	Plain stage	Pierre Beuffeuil (FRA)
21	17 July	Troyes to Paris	200 km (120 mi)	Plain stage	Jean Graczyk (FRA)
	Total		4,173 km (2,593 mi)		

== Race overview ==
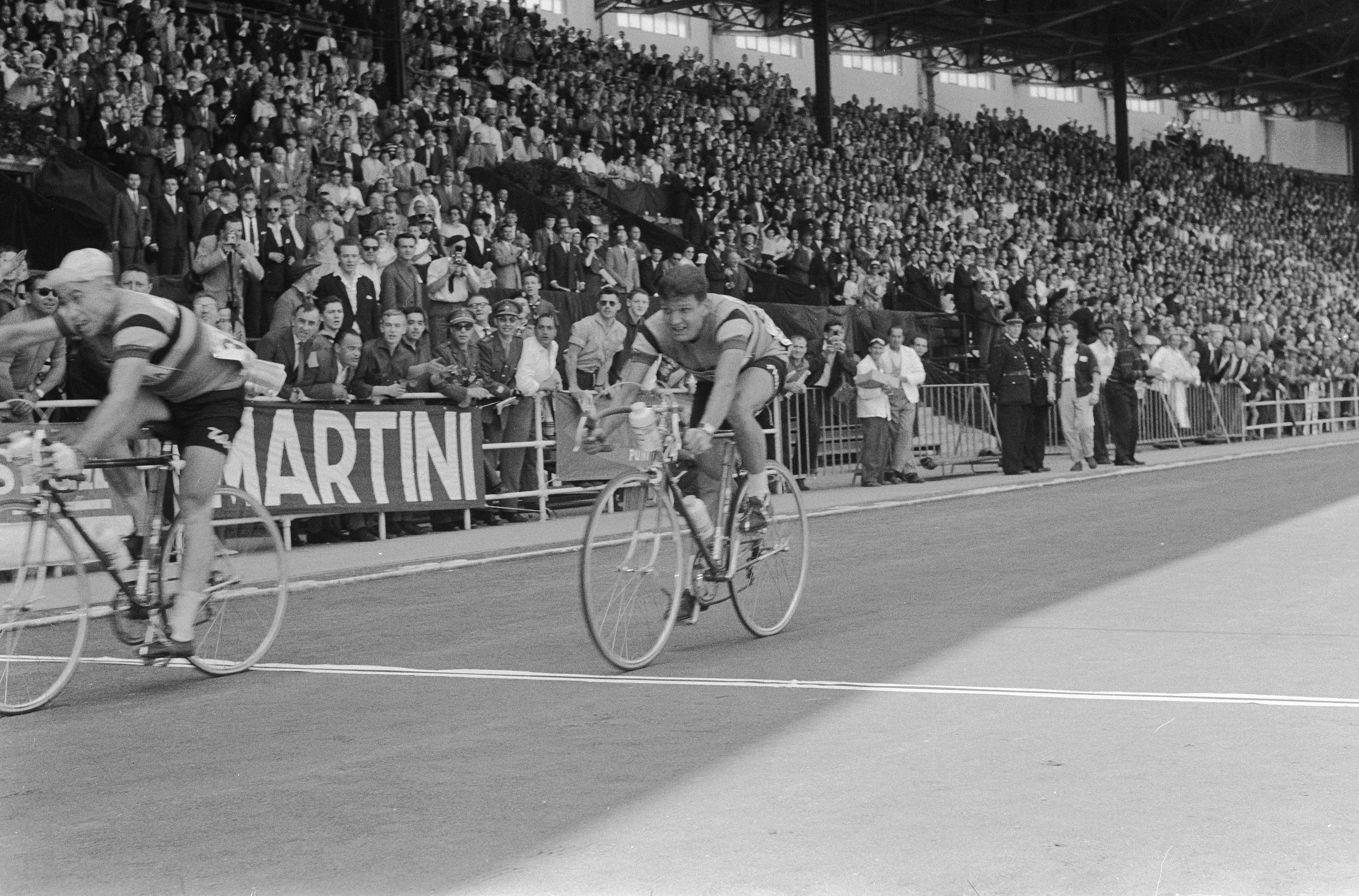
Julien Schepens crossing the finish line ahead of Jacques Marinelli to win stage two at Heysel Stadium in Brussels

The first stage was split in two parts. In the first part, a group of fourteen cyclists cleared from the rest, and won with a margin of over two minutes. In the second part, an individual time trial, Roger Rivière won. The lead in the general classification transferred to Nencini, who had been part of the group of fourteen cyclists. Federico Bahamontes, winner of the 1959 Tour, became ill and left the race in the second stage.

Nencini lost the lead in the third stage to Joseph Groussard. In the fourth stage, a group including Henri Anglade escaped, and Anglade became the new leader. Anglade had already finished in second placed in 1959, and expected to be the team leader now.

In the sixth stage, Rivière attacked. Only Nencini, Hans Junkermann and Jan Adriaensens could follow. Anglade asked his team manager Marcel Bidot to instruct Rivière to stop his attack, because Nencini and Adriaensens were dangerous opponents. Rivière ignored this, and continued. They beat the rest by almost fifteen minutes, and Adriaensens took over the lead in the general classification. After the stage, Anglade said that the French team lost the Tour in that stage. Anglade knew that Rivière would try to stay close to Nencini in the mountains, and warned that Rivière would regret staying close to Nencini downhill.

The first mountains were climbed in the tenth stage. Nencini won time in the descent from the Col d'Aubisque, where Adriaensens could not follow. After the Aubisque, Adriaensens worked together with his teammate Jef Planckaert to win back time, but Nencini was able to stay away from them, and became the new leader, with Rivière in second place, only 32 seconds behind. Nencini gained one minute on Rivière in the eleventh stage, but Rivière knew he had the stronger team. Moreover, Rivière was at that moment the holder of the hour record, and knew he would win back enough time in the time trial in stage 19.

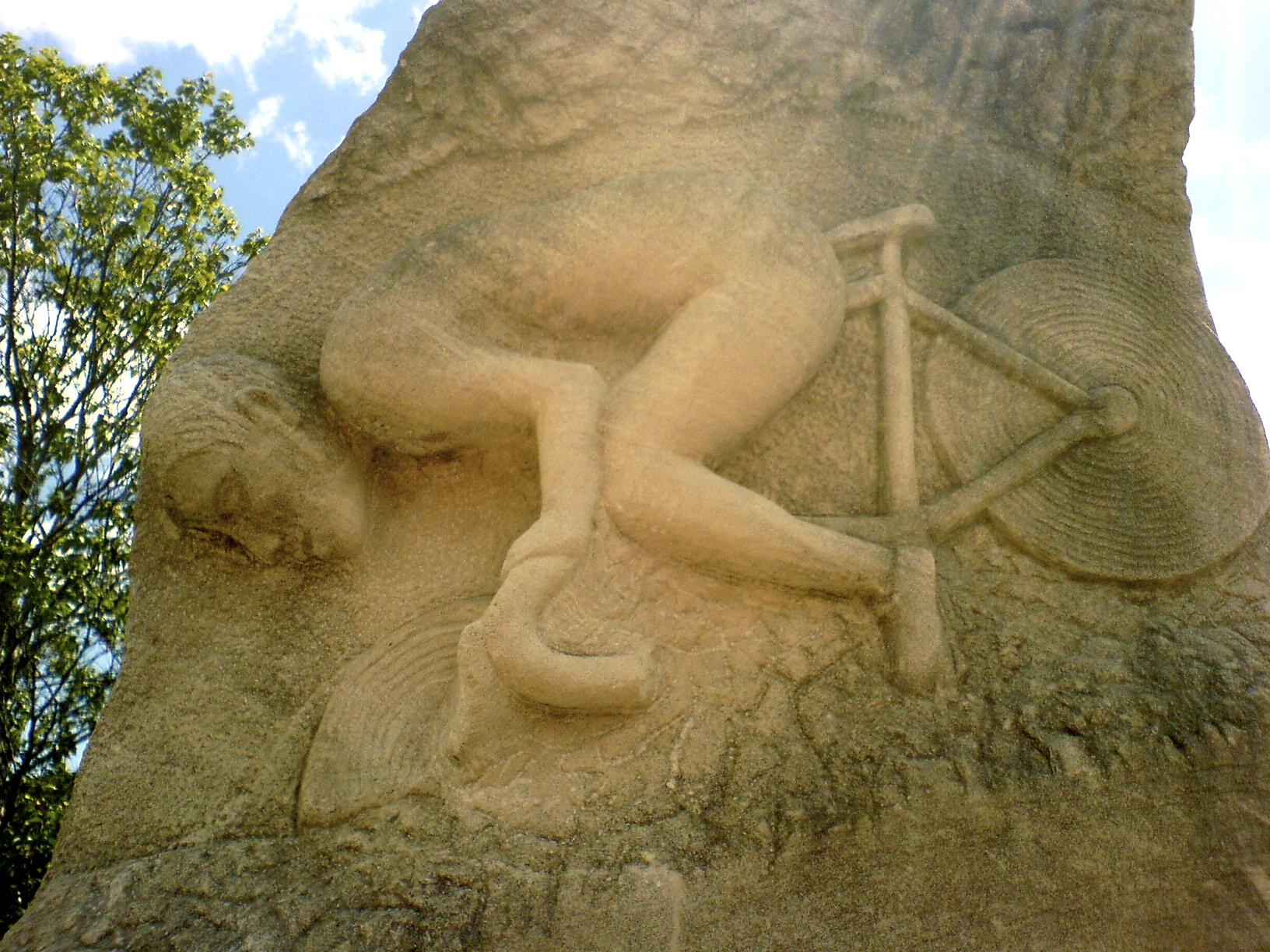
The monument for Roger Rivière, at the location where he fell descending the Col de Perjuret

In the fourteenth stage, descending the Col de Perjuret, Rivière followed Nencini, considered one of the best descenders in the peloton but misjudged a turn and went off a cliff. Rivière broke his back in the fall, and never raced again.

Because of this, Jan Adriaensens climbed to the second place in the general classification, and he now was the main competitor for Nencini. Adriaensens lost time in the Pyrenees, and the Italians were able to put Graziano Battistini in second place. In the last stages, there was no competition for the overall victory, because it was clear that Nencini's advantage was too large. Therefore, all cyclists put their energy to win the remaining stages. For the points classification, Jean Graczyk had built a large lead, but the mountains classification was only clinched by Imerio Massignan in the final mountain stage.

In the twentieth stage, news came that Charles de Gaulle, the president, would be by the route at Colombey-les-deux-Églises, where he lived. The organisers, Jacques Goddet and Félix Lévitan asked the French national champion, Henry Anglade, if the riders would be willing to stop. Anglade agreed and the news was spread through the race. One rider, Pierre Beuffeuil had stopped to repair a tyre and knew nothing of the plan, being three minutes behind the race. When he reached Colombey, he found the race halted in front of him. He decided to pass all the waiting cyclists and continued alone, and won the stage alone on the boulevard Jules-Guesde by 49 seconds. "I voted for de Gaulle", he said.

== Classification leadership and minor prizes ==
There were several classifications in the 1960 Tour de France, two of them awarding jerseys to their leaders. The most important was the general classification; it was calculated by adding for each cyclist he times that he required to finish each stage. If a cyclist had received a time bonus, it was subtracted from this total; all time penalties were added to this total. The cyclist with the least accumulated time was the race leader, identified by the yellow jersey.

Points given in each stage
Position	1	2	3	4	5	6
Points	10	6	4	3	2	1

The points classification was calculated differently than in the years before. The top six cyclists of each stage received points; the winner 10 points, down to 1 point for the 6th cyclist. Because only a few cyclists received points, in the first stages of the Tour the lead was shared by up to 5 cyclists. In stage 4, when Jean Graczyk won the stage, he took the leading, having finished second in the stage 2. Graczyk remained leader for the rest of the race. The leader of the points classification was identified by the green jersey.

The mountains classification was calculated by adding the points given to cyclists for reaching the highest point in a climb first. There was no jersey associated to this classification in 1960.

Finally, the team classification was calculated as the sum of the daily team classifications, and the daily team classification was calculated by adding the times in the stage result of the best three cyclists per team. It was won by the French team. For the smaller teams (made of 8 cyclists), a separate classification was made, here the Dutch team won. The Great Britain team and the Internationals did not finish with three cyclists, so were not included in the team classification.

In addition, there was a combativity award, in which a jury composed of journalists gave points after each stage to the cyclist they considered most combative. The split stages each had a combined winner. At the conclusion of the Tour, Jean Graczyk won the overall super-combativity award, also decided by journalists. The Souvenir Henri Desgrange was given in honour of Tour founder Henri Desgrange to the first rider to pass the summit of the Col du Lautaret on stage 17. This prize was won by Graczyk.

Classification leadership by stage
Stage	Winner	General classification	Points classification	Mountains classification (Note: No jersey was awarded to the leader of the mountains classification until a white jersey with red polka dots was introduced in 1975.)	Team classification	Combativity award	Bad luck award
1a	Julien Schepens	Julien Schepens	Julien Schepens	no award	Belgium	Joseph Groussard	Luis Otaño
1b	Roger Rivière	Gastone Nencini	3 cyclists (Note: Gastone Nencini, Roger Rivière and Julien Schepens had equal points.)	no award	Belgium	Joseph Groussard	Luis Otaño
2	René Privat	Gastone Nencini	4 cyclists (Note: René Privat, Gastone Nencini, Roger Rivière and Julien Schepens had equal points.)	no award	France	Tom Simpson	Spain
3	Nino Defilippis	Joseph Groussard	5 cyclists (Note: Nino Defilippis, René Privat, Gastone Nencini, Roger Rivière and Julien Schepens had equal points.)	no award	France	Joseph Groussard	Jos Hoevenaers
4	Jean Graczyk	Henry Anglade	Jean Graczyk	no award	France	Henry Anglade	Göran Karlsson
5	André Darrigade	Henry Anglade	Jean Graczyk	no award	France	Camille Le Menn	Rudi Altig
6	Roger Rivière	Jan Adriaensens	Jean Graczyk	no award	France	Gastone Nencini	no award
7	Graziano Battistini	Jan Adriaensens	Jean Graczyk	no award	France	Pierre Beuffeuil	Pierino Baffi
8	Nino Defilippis	Jan Adriaensens	Jean Graczyk	no award	France	Jean Milesi	Stéphane Lach
9	Martin van Geneugden	Jan Adriaensens	Jean Graczyk	no award	France	Jean Graczyk	André Foucher
10	Roger Rivière	Gastone Nencini	Jean Graczyk	Graziano Battistini	France	Graziano Battistini	Tom Simpson
11	Kurt Gimmi	Gastone Nencini	Jean Graczyk	Gimmi / Nencini	France	Kurt Gimmi	Imerio Massignan
12	Jean Graczyk	Gastone Nencini	Jean Graczyk	Gimmi / Nencini	France	Jef Planckaert	Harry Reynolds
13	Louis Proost	Gastone Nencini	Jean Graczyk	Gimmi / Nencini	France	Louis Proost	Manuel Busto
14	Martin van Geneugden	Gastone Nencini	Jean Graczyk	Gastone Nencini	France	Jean Graczyk	Roger Rivière
15	Michel Van Aerde	Gastone Nencini	Jean Graczyk	Gimmi / Nencini	France	Tom Simpson	Louis Proost
16	Graziano Battistini	Gastone Nencini	Jean Graczyk	Marcel Rohrbach	France	Imerio Massignan	Brian Robinson
17	Jean Graczyk	Gastone Nencini	Jean Graczyk	Marcel Rohrbach	France	René Marigil	René Marigil
18	Fernando Manzaneque	Gastone Nencini	Jean Graczyk	Imerio Massignan	France	Fernando Manzaneque	Martin Van Geneugden
19	Rolf Graf	Gastone Nencini	Jean Graczyk	Imerio Massignan	France	Camille Le Menn	Victor Sutton
20	Pierre Beuffeuil	Gastone Nencini	Jean Graczyk	Imerio Massignan	France	Pierre Beuffeuil	Jan Adriaensens
21	Jean Graczyk	Gastone Nencini	Jean Graczyk	Imerio Massignan	France	Jean Graczyk	André Darrigade
Final		Gastone Nencini	Jean Graczyk	Imerio Massignan	France	Jean Graczyk	Roger Rivière

== Final standings ==
=== General classification ===
Final general classification (1–10)
Rank	Rider	Team	Time
1	Gastone Nencini (ITA)	Italy	112h 08' 42"
2	Graziano Battistini (ITA)	Italy	+ 5' 02"
3	Jan Adriaensens (BEL)	Belgium	+ 10' 24"
4	Hans Junkermann (FRG)	Germany	+ 11' 21"
5	Jozef Planckaert (BEL)	Belgium	+ 13' 02"
6	Raymond Mastrotto (FRA)	France	+ 16' 12"
7	Arnaldo Pambianco (ITA)	Italy	+ 17' 58"
8	Henry Anglade (FRA)	France	+ 19' 17"
9	Marcel Rohrbach (FRA)	Centre-Midi	+ 20' 02"
10	Imerio Massignan (ITA)	Italy	+ 23' 28"

Final general classification (11–81)
Rank	Rider	Team	Time
11	Fernando Manzaneque (ESP)	Spain	+ 25' 59"
12	Albert Geldermans (NED)	Netherlands	+ 26' 33"
13	Jean Graczyk (FRA)	France	+ 26' 55"
14	François Mahe (FRA)	France	+ 32' 36"
15	Louis Rostollan (FRA)	France	+ 34' 18"
16	André Darrigade (FRA)	France	+ 34' 23"
17	Antonio Suárez (ESP)	Spain	+ 39' 15"
18	Edouard Delberghe (FRA)	France	+ 44' 25"
19	René Pavard (FRA)	France	+ 48' 13"
20	Carmelo Morales (ESP)	Spain	+ 50' 44"
21	Jesús Loroño (ESP)	Spain	+ 52' 10"
22	Kurt Gimmi (SUI)	Switzerland/Luxembourg	+ 54' 40"
23	Stéphan Lach (FRA)	Paris/North	+ 55' 02"
24	Michel Van Aerde (BEL)	Belgium	+ 56' 51"
25	Eddy Pauwels (BEL)	Belgium	+ 59' 05"
26	Brian Robinson (GBR)	Great Britain	+ 59' 52"
27	Piet Damen (NED)	Netherlands	+ 1h 00' 21"
28	Piet van Est (NED)	Netherlands	+ 1h 02' 48"
29	Tom Simpson (GBR)	Great Britain	+ 1h 09' 01"
30	Michel Vermeulin (FRA)	Paris/North	+ 1h 11' 42"
31	Pierre Beuffeuil (FRA)	Centre-Midi	+ 1h 12' 02"
32	Pierre Everaert (FRA)	France	+ 1h 17' 13"
33	Ercole Baldini (ITA)	Italy	+ 1h 21' 06"
34	Martin van den Borgh (NED)	Netherlands	+ 1h 25' 18"
35	Jean Dotto (FRA)	France	+ 1h 25' 28"
36	Jean Gainche (FRA)	West	+ 1h 30' 31"
37	René Strehler (SUI)	Switzerland/Luxembourg	+ 1h 32' 09"
38	Joseph Wasko (FRA)	Paris/North	+ 1h 33' 34"
39	Wim van Est (NED)	Netherlands	+ 1h 40' 10"
40	Félix Lebuhotel (FRA)	West	+ 1h 46' 58"
41	Alfredo Sabbadin (ITA)	Italy	+ 1h 48' 47"
42	Luis Otaño (ESP)	Spain	+ 1h 49' 55"
43	André Messelis (BEL)	Belgium	+ 1h 53' 10"
44	Bernard Viot (FRA)	Paris/North	+ 1h 53' 37"
45	Jaap Kersten (NED)	Netherlands	+ 1h 54' 16"
46	Fernand Picot (FRA)	West	+ 1h 55' 56"
47	André Le Dissez (FRA)	Paris/North	+ 1h 57' 13"
48	Raymond Hoorelbeke (FRA)	Paris/North	+ 1h 58' 22"
49	Roberto Falaschi (ITA)	Italy	+ 2h 00' 07"
50	Marcel Queheille (FRA)	Centre-Midi	+ 2h 00' 37"
51	Lothar Friedrich (FRG)	West Germany	+ 2h 01' 45"
52	Joseph Groussard (FRA)	West	+ 2h 01' 49"
53	Armand Desmet (BEL)	Belgium	+ 2h 02' 05"
54	Aldo Bolzan (ITA)	Switzerland/Luxembourg	+ 2h 02' 09"
55	Jean Milesi (FRA)	East/South-East	+ 2h 02' 40"
56	Emil Reinecke (FRG)	West Germany	+ 2h 04' 36"
57	Vittorio Casatti (ITA)	Italy	+ 2h 05' 38"
58	Max Bleneau (FRA)	West	+ 2h 18' 57"
59	Antonin Rolland (FRA)	East/South-East	+ 2h 21' 09"
60	Tino Sabbadini (FRA)	Centre-Midi	+ 2h 24' 46"
61	Édouard Bihouée (FRA)	West	+ 2h 31' 13"
62	René Marigil (ESP)	Spain	+ 2h 35' 51"
63	Pierre Ruby (FRA)	Centre-Midi	+ 2h 37' 09"
64	Ivo Molenaers (BEL)	Belgium	+ 2h 39' 31"
65	Alves Barbosa (POR)	Internationals	+ 2h 39' 55"
66	Camille Le Menn (FRA)	Centre-Midi	+ 2h 40' 52"
67	Nino Defilippis (ITA)	Italy	+ 2h 42' 10"
68	Pierino Baffi (ITA)	Italy	+ 2h 44' 39"
69	Miguel Pacheco (ESP)	Spain	+ 2h 46' 29"
70	Rolf Graf (SUI)	Switzerland/Luxembourg	+ 2h 49' 58"
71	Gianni Ferlenghi (ITA)	Italy	+ 2h 51' 46"
72	Dino Bruni (ITA)	Italy	+ 2h 52' 51"
73	Francis Pipelin (FRA)	West	+ 2h 54' 08"
74	Louis Bisilliat (FRA)	East/South-East	+ 3h 02' 47"
75	Manuel Busto (FRA)	Centre-Midi	+ 3h 04' 34"
76	Nello Fabbri (ITA)	Italy	+ 3h 06' 57"
77	Pierre Morel (FRA)	East/South-East	+ 3h 10' 25"
78	Fernando Brandolini (ITA)	Italy	+ 3h 12' 59"
79	Bernard Gauthier (FRA)	East/South-East	+ 3h 36' 05"
80	Hans Schleuniger (SUI)	Switzerland/Luxembourg	+ 4h 48' 02"
81	José Berrendero (ESP)	Spain	+ 4h 58' 59"

=== Points classification ===
Final points classification (1–10)
Rank	Rider	Team	Points
1	Jean Graczyk (FRA)	France	74
2	Graziano Battistini (ITA)	Italy	40
3	Gastone Nencini (ITA)	Italy	35
4	Nino Defilippis (ITA)	Italy	25
5	André Darrigade (FRA)	France	22
6	Dino Bruni (ITA)	Italy	19
6	Michel Van Aerde (BEL)	Belgium	19
8	Fernando Manzaneque (ESP)	Spain	16
9	Pierre Beuffeuil (FRA)	Centre-Midi	15
9	Bernard Viot (BEL)	Paris/North	15

=== Mountains classification ===
Final mountains classification (1–10)
Rank	Rider	Team	Points
1	Imerio Massignan (ITA)	Italy	56
2	Marcel Rohrbach (FRA)	Centre-Midi	52
3	Graziano Battistini (ITA)	Italy	44
4	Kurt Gimmi (SUI)	Switzerland	36
4	Gastone Nencini (ITA)	Italy	36
6	Fernando Manzaneque (ESP)	Spain	28
7	Martin van der Borgh (NED)	Netherlands	22
8	René Marigil (ESP)	Spain	21
9	Jef Planckaert (BEL)	Belgium	20
10	Arnaldo Pambianco (ITA)	Italy	18

=== Team classification ===
Final team classification
Rank	Team	Big/small	Time
1	France	Big	335h 43' 43"
2	Italy	Big	+ 13' 36"
3	Belgium	Big	+ 1h 03' 01"
4	Spain	Big	+ 1h 51' 55"
5	Netherlands	Small	+ 2h 01' 56"
6	Paris/North	Small	+ 2h 57' 41"
7	Centre-Midi	Small	+ 3h 01' 01"
8	West Germany	Small	+ 3h 52' 52"
9	West	Small	+ 4h 08' 36"
10	Switzerland/Luxembourg	Small	+ 4h 31' 03"
11	East/South-East	Small	+ 6h 17' 02"

=== Super-combativity award ===
Super-combativity award (1–4)
Rank	Rider	Team	Points
1	Jean Graczyk (FRA)	France	363
2	Graziano Battistini (ITA)	Italy	161
3	Jean Milesi (FRA)	East/South-East	156
4	Pierre Beuffeuil (FRA)	Centre-Midi	50

== Aftermath ==
Rivière survived the crash, but his career as a professional cyclist was over. The drug palfium was found in his pockets, and it was thought that it had so numbed Riviere's fingers so that he couldn't feel the brake levers. Nencini had his bouquet of flowers given to Rivière.

== Bibliography ==
- Augendre, Jacques (2016). Guide historique [Historical guide] (PDF) (in French). Paris: Amaury Sport Organisation. Archived (PDF) from the original on 17 August 2016.
- Dauncey, Hugh; Hare, Geoff (2003). The Tour de France, 1903–2003: A Century of Sporting Structures, Meanings and Values. London: Frank Cass & Co. ISBN 978-0-203-50241-9.
- McGann, Bill; McGann, Carol (2006). The Story of the Tour de France: 1903–1964. Vol. 1. Indianapolis: Dog Ear Publishing. ISBN 978-1-59858-180-5.
- Nauright, John; Parrish, Charles (2012). Sports Around the World: History, Culture, and Practice. Vol. 2. Santa Barbara, California: ABC-CLIO. ISBN 978-1-59884-300-2.
- van den Akker, Pieter (2018). Tour de France Rules and Statistics: 1903–2018. Self-published. ISBN 978-1-79398-080-9.
