= Hans Jaroszewicz =

German cyclist (1935–2003)

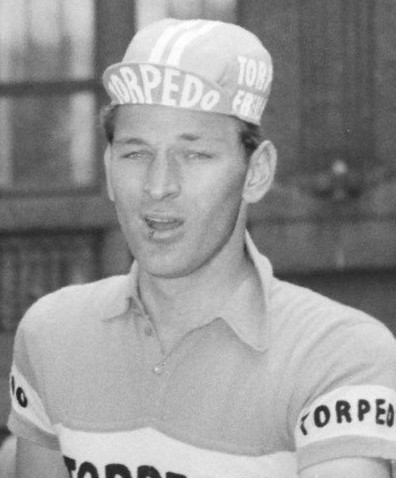
- Hans Jaroszewicz (1960)

Personal information
- Born: 4 January 1935 Berlin, Germany
- Died: 22 June 2003 (aged 68) Triberg, Germany

Cycling career
- Sport: Cycling
- Role: Rider

Hans Jaroszewicz, nicknamed Jaro, (4 January 1935 – 22 June 2003) was a German professional road and track racing cyclist active in the 1950a and early 1960s. He rode in the 1960 and 1961 Tour de France.

== Career ==
Jaroszewicz started his career as an amateur. As an amateur he became about others German national champion in the individual pursuit in 1958 ahead of Otto Altweck; finishing second behind him in 1959. On the late 1950s he had also multiple medals at the national championships in the team pursuit.

He won among others in 1960 a stage in the Ronde van Nederland winning of Jo de Haan and Bas Maliepaard. He also won the stage race Grosse-Mueckepreiss in Krefeld in 1960. During the 1960 Tour de France, he became after stage six a main contender for the general classification.

He was involved in multiple severe crashes. During the 1961 Tour de France he was involved in a serious crash and was airlifted by a trauma helicopter. In November 1961 during the Six Days of Frankfurt he fell together with Dieter Gieseler. They crashed into Piet van der Heyden who later died in hospital.

As track cyclist he competed in many Six Days races. He rode together with among Otto Altweck in 1959, and in 1962 with Horst Oldenburg at the Six Days of Berlin and with Guenter Ziegler at the Six Days of Cologne.

His daughter Stephanie is married to former professional cyclist Jens Voigt.
