= Julien Schepens =

Belgian cyclist

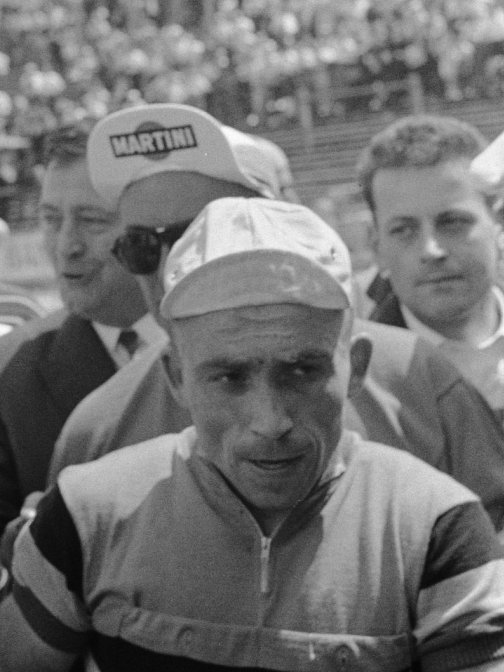
- Schepens at the 1960 Tour de France

Personal information
- Full name: Julien Schepens
- Born: 19 December 1935 Anzegem, Belgium
- Died: 16 August 2006 (aged 70) Nokere, Belgium

Cycling career
- Sport: Cycling
- Discipline: Road
- Role: Rider

Major wins
- 1 stage 1960 Tour de France

Julien Schepens (19 December 1935 – 16 August 2006) was a Belgian professional road bicycle racer. He won a stage in the 1960 Tour de France and also wore the yellow jersey for one day after his stage win. Other career highlights include stage wins in Paris–Nice and Four Days of Dunkirk as well as winning the Grand Prix de Denain in 1962.

== Major results ==
1953
Belgium National novice road race Championship
1954
Belgium National amateur road race Championship
1956
Kortemark
Omloop Leiedal
1956
Anzegem
Belgium National independents road race Championship
Ruiselede
1957
Beernem
1960
Bankprijs Roeselare
Omloop der drie Proviniciën
Mandel-Leie-Schelde
Tour de France:

Winner stage 1A
Wearing yellow jersey for one day

1962
Grand Prix de Denain
Eizer Overijse
