= Vittorio Casatti =

Italian cyclist

Personal information
- Born: 8 May 1938 (age 88) Bergamo, Italy

Cycling career
- Sport: Cycling
- Role: Rider

Vittorio Casatti (born 8 May 1938) is an Italian former professional racing cyclist. He rode in the 1960 Tour de France.
