= René Pavard =

French cyclist (1934–2012)

Personal information
- Born: 3 October 1934 Paris, France
- Died: 16 June 2012 (aged 77) Le Vaudoué, France

Cycling career
- Sport: Cycling
- Role: Rider

René Daniel Pavard (3 October 1934 – 16 June 2012) was a French professional racing cyclist. He rode in the 1959 and 1960 Tour de France. Pavard died in Le Vaudoué on 16 June 2012, at the age of 77.
