= Pierre Beuffeuil =

French cyclist

Personal information
- Full name: Pierre Beuffeuil
- Born: October 30, 1934 (age 91) L'Éguille, France

Cycling career
- Sport: Cycling
- Discipline: Road
- Role: Rider

Professional teams
- 1956–1964: Mercier–BP–Hutchinson
- 1965: Ford France–Gitane
- 1966: Kamomé–Dilecta
- 1967: Tigra–Grammont

Major wins
- 2 stages Tour de France

Pierre Beuffeuil (L'Éguille, France, 30 October 1934) is a former French professional road bicycle racer. He won a stage of the Tour de France after the rest of the field had stopped to greet Charles de Gaulle, the president.

== Tour de France ==
Pierre Beuffeuil was riding the Tour de France in 1960 for the regional Centre-Midi team when news came that Charles de Gaulle, the president, would be by the route at Colombey-les-deux-Églises, where he lived. The organisers, Jacques Goddet and Félix Lévitan asked the national champion, Henry Anglade, if the riders would be willing to stop. Anglade agreed and the news was spread through the race.

Beuffeuil, however, had stopped to repair a tyre and knew nothing of the plan. He was three minutes behind the race. He reached Colombey convinced he would still be behind the race when it finished in Troyes, then found the race halted in front of him. He pressed on alone, now leading rather than following, and won the stage alone on the boulevard Jules-Guesde by 49 seconds.

"I voted for de Gaulle", he said.

Beuffeuil won the stage from Montluçon to Orléans in 1966 after a break of 204 km. He came third in the Four Days of Dunkirk in 1961 and again in 1966.

== Major results ==
1956
Circuit d'Aquitaine
Ontron
Vergt
1959
Auzances
Périgueux
1960
Bourcefranc
Peyrelevade
Tour de France:

Winner stage 20

1961
Quilan
1962
Circuit des genêts verts
Guéret
Maël-Pestivien
1965
Chaniers
Saint-Just
1966
Saint-Tropez
Tour de France:

Winner stage 21

1967
Querrien
Valence-sur-Baise
