= Joseph Groussard =

French cyclist

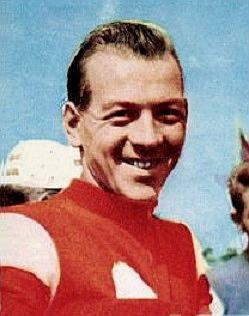
- Joseph Groussard (1966)

Personal information
- Full name: Joseph Groussard
- Nickname: Le coq de Fourgères
- Born: 2 March 1934 (age 92) La Chapelle-Janson, France

Cycling career
- Sport: Cycling
- Current team: Retired
- Discipline: Road
- Role: Rider

Major wins
- Grand Prix du Midi Libre (1961); Critérium International (1962); Milan–San Remo (1963)

Joseph Groussard (born 2 March 1934 in La Chapelle-Janson, Brittany, France) is a former French professional road bicycle racer. Groussard was professional from 1954 to 1968. He rode 9 editions of the Tour de France where he won one stage in the 1959 Tour de France and wore the yellow jersey as leader of the general classification for one day in 1960 Tour de France. Other victories include two wins in Paris–Camembert, stage wins in Paris–Nice, wins in Critérium International and Four Days of Dunkirk and the 1963 edition of Milan–San Remo. In 1965, Groussard became the Lanterne rouge (last finishing rider) in the 1965 Tour de France.

Joseph Groussard is the brother of cyclist Georges Groussard.

== Major results ==
1957
Locmalo
Paris–Camembert
1958
Fougères
1959
GP Monaco
Plumeliau
Genoa–Nice
Tour de France:

Winner stage 22

1960
Circuit de l'Indre
Paris–Camembert
Tour de France:

Wearing yellow jersey for one day

Pontivy
1961
Brignolles
Etoile du Léon
Issoire
Grand Prix du Midi Libre
Saint-Georges de Chesné
Grand Prix du Parisien
1962
Critérium International
GP du Locle
Saint-Claud
Four Days of Dunkirk
Oradour-sur-Glane
Quilan
1963
Milan–San Remo
1964
Auxerre
Châteaugiron
Fougères
Lorient
Miniac-Morvan
Saint-Brieuc
1965
Bordeaux-Saintes
Loctudy
Montmorillon
Pontivy
Saint-Georges de Chesné
1966
Saint-Georges de Chesné
1968
Laval
