= Jean Milesi =

French cyclist

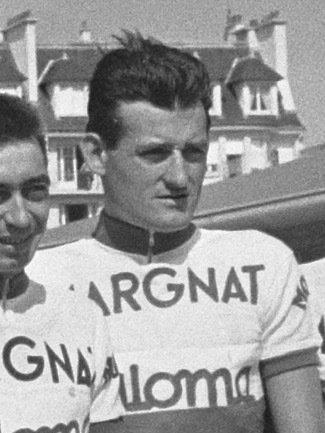
- Milesi at the 1964 Tour de France

Personal information
- Born: 24 June 1935 (age 91) Digne-les-Bains, France

Cycling career
- Sport: Cycling
- Role: Rider

Jean Milesi (born 24 June 1935) is a French former professional racing cyclist. He rode in seven editions of the Tour de France.
