= Roger Rivière =

French cyclist

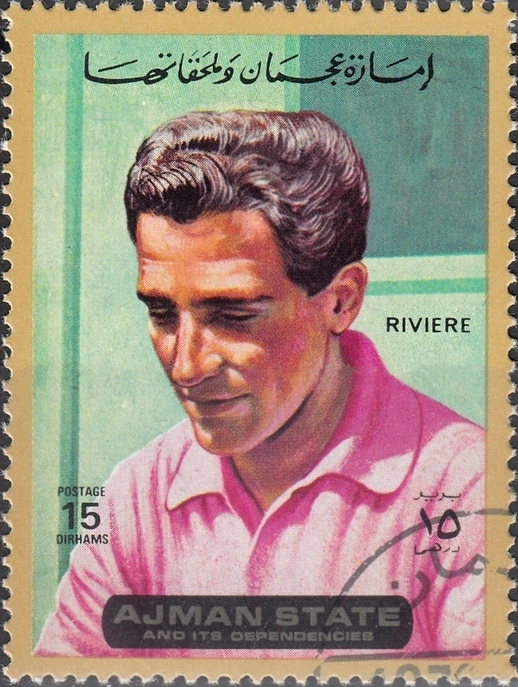
- Rivière on a 1972 UAE stamp

Personal information
- Full name: Roger Rivière
- Born: 23 February 1936 Saint-Étienne, France
- Died: 1 April 1976 (aged 40) Saint-Galmier, France

Cycling career
- Sport: Cycling
- Discipline: Road
- Role: Rider

Major wins
- Grand Tours Tour de France 5 individual stages (1959, 1960) Vuelta a España 2 individual stages (1959) 2 TTT stages (1959)

Roger Rivière (French pronunciation: [ʁɔʒe ʁivjɛʁ]; 23 February 1936 – 1 April 1976) was a French track and road bicycle racer. He raced as a professional from 1957 to 1960.

Rivière, a time trialist, all-around talent on the road, and a three-time world pursuit champion on the track, lost his career to injury. He was considered to have a chance of winning the 1960 Tour de France but crashed on the Col de Perjuret descent of Mont Aigoual in the Massif Central while following leader Gastone Nencini. Rivière hit a guard-block on the edge of the road, falling 20 meters into a ravine. He landed in brush, breaking two vertebrae. The injury permanently disabled Riviére, confining him to a wheelchair and ending his career.

== Early career ==
Rivière started as a track rider, at the old velodrome in St-Étienne. At 19 he beat Jacques Anquetil for the national pursuit championship at the Parc des Princes in Paris. He turned professional in 1957, when he beat Albert Bouvet to win the world pursuit championship at Rocourt, Belgium.

== Hour record ==
On the advice of his team manager, Raphaël Géminiani, and his agent, Daniel Dousset, Rivière attempted Ercole Baldini's hour record on 18 September 1957 at the Vigorelli track in Milan. He was still in national service in the army at Joinville, near Paris, although in a battalion which allowed the country's top athletes to train at public expense. He rode a 7.28m gear and took the record with 46 km 923m.

He won the world pursuit championship again in 1958, at the Parc des Princes, beating Leandro Faggin in the final with 5m 59s, the first time the title had been won in less than six minutes. He said he would attack the hour again, on 23 September. He rode 53×15 (7.48 m), higher than that usually used by sprinters. He punctured but started again and became the first rider to exceed 47 km/h. Pierre Chany wrote:

When the Frenchman arrived at the stadium, on the stroke of 4.30pm, making his way through the Jeeps of the police which gave a real feeling of something special happening, 12,000 people had already taken their place in the stadium. On the track, Renée Vissac was busy beating the women's record. The Stéphanois watched her not without some amusement, exchanged small talk, then went to his cabin, while his entourage measured the strength of the wind: matches blew out and the smoke from cigarettes stretched out horizontally. After a long moment, Rivière reappeared. He was wearing a helmet covered in nylon, varnished shoes and a world champion's jersey made of silk. He rode a few laps of the track behind a scooter and then stopped.

Rivière thought the draught blowing through the stadium too strong and wanted to return to his hotel. At 6pm he agreed with Dousset and his soigneur, Roger Provost, to start the ride.

René de Latour wrote in Sporting Cyclist:

One lap of the Vigorelli track is 397 metres. The bell was to ring every 30.8 seconds. If Rivière was on the [finish] line, it meant that he was riding at Baldini's pace. But right from the first kilometre, Rivière forgot all the warnings. He was going like mad, and the man with the bell whose jobs it was to signal his position each time the bell rang had to run as much as 30 yards a lap.

On finishing, he asked journalists whether he was talking coherently and not still giddy from going round and round the track. His record lasted nine years.

== Tour de France crash ==
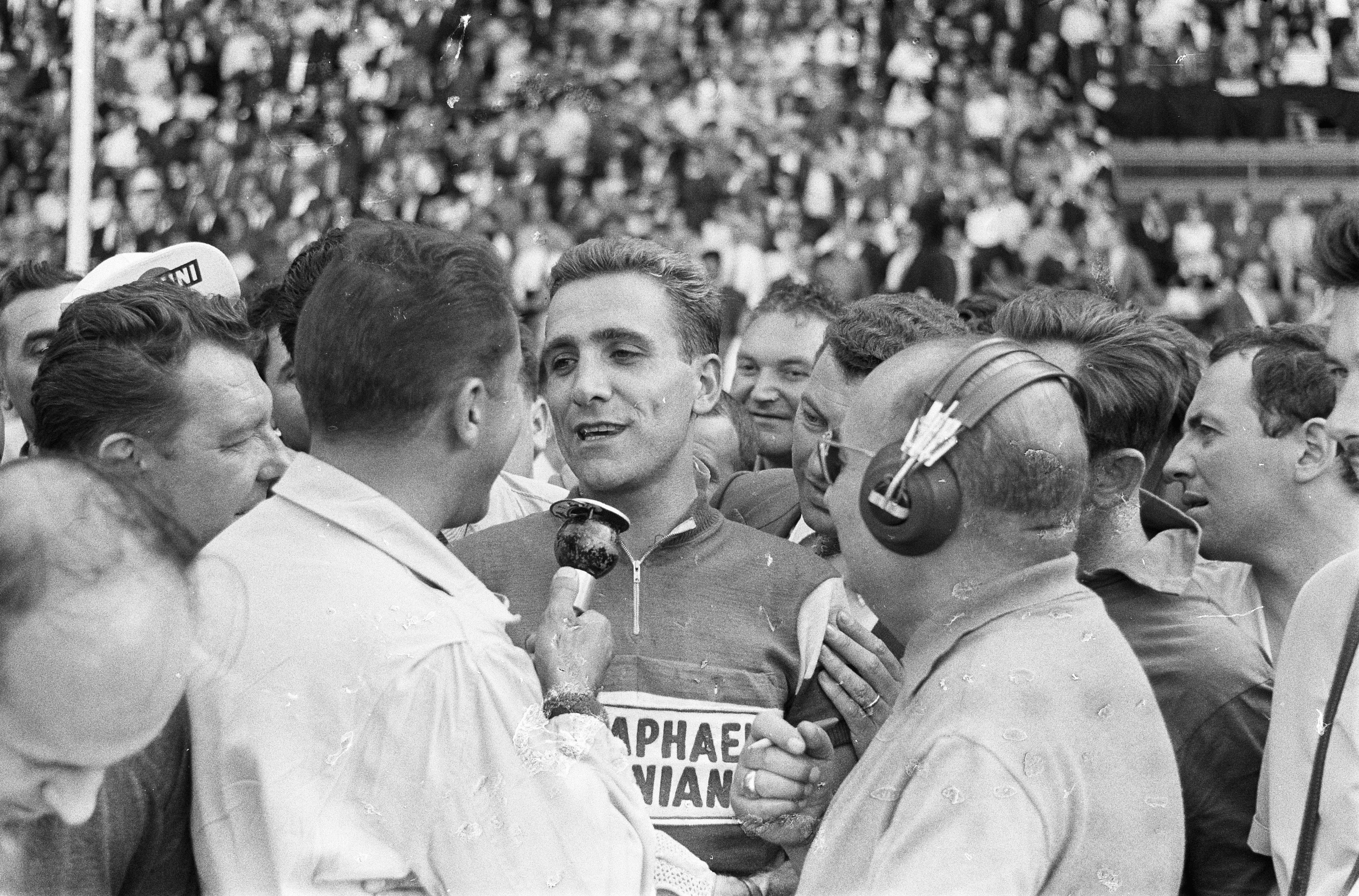
Rivière giving an interview during the 1960 Tour de France

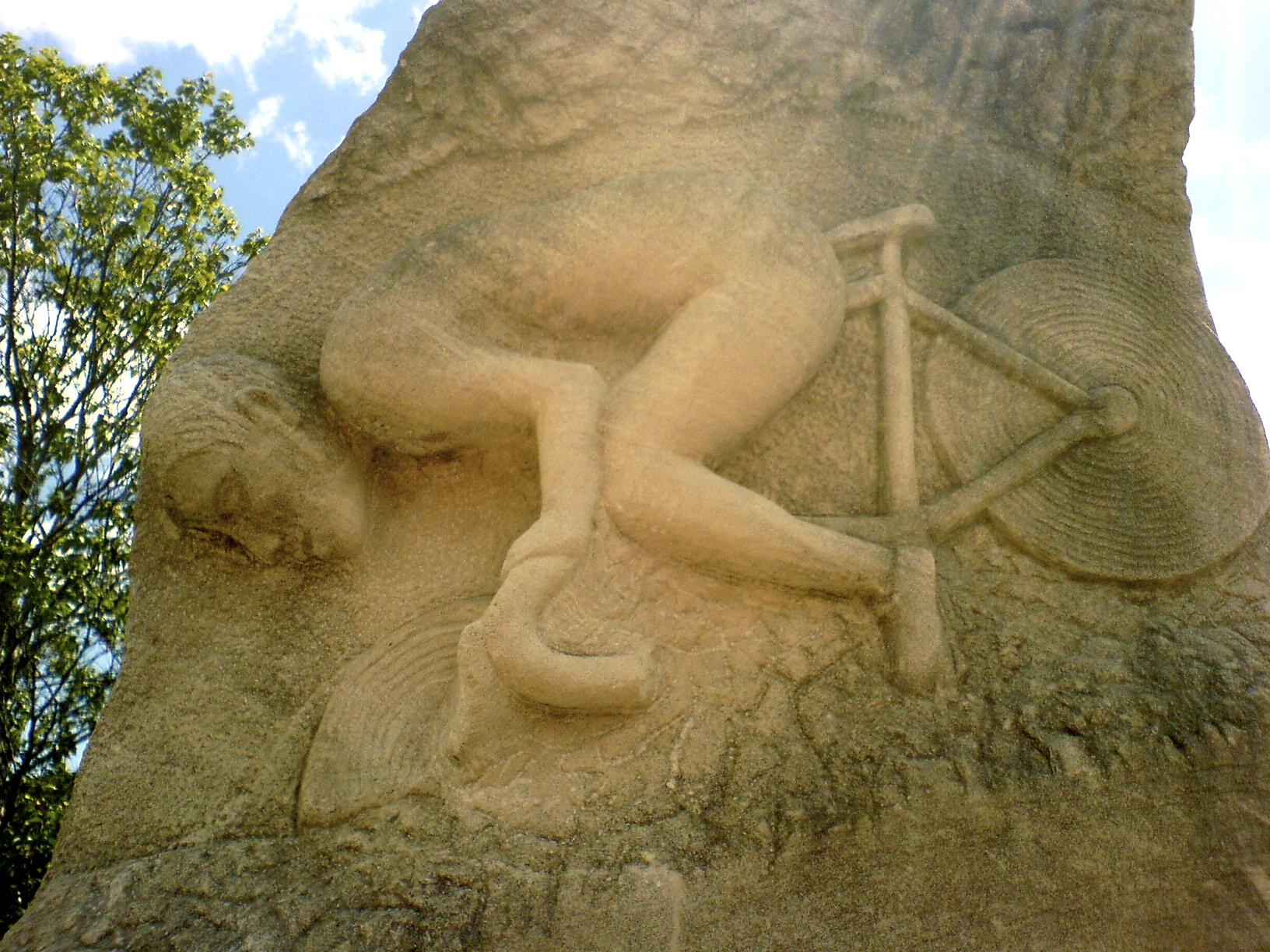
A monument records where Rivière fell.

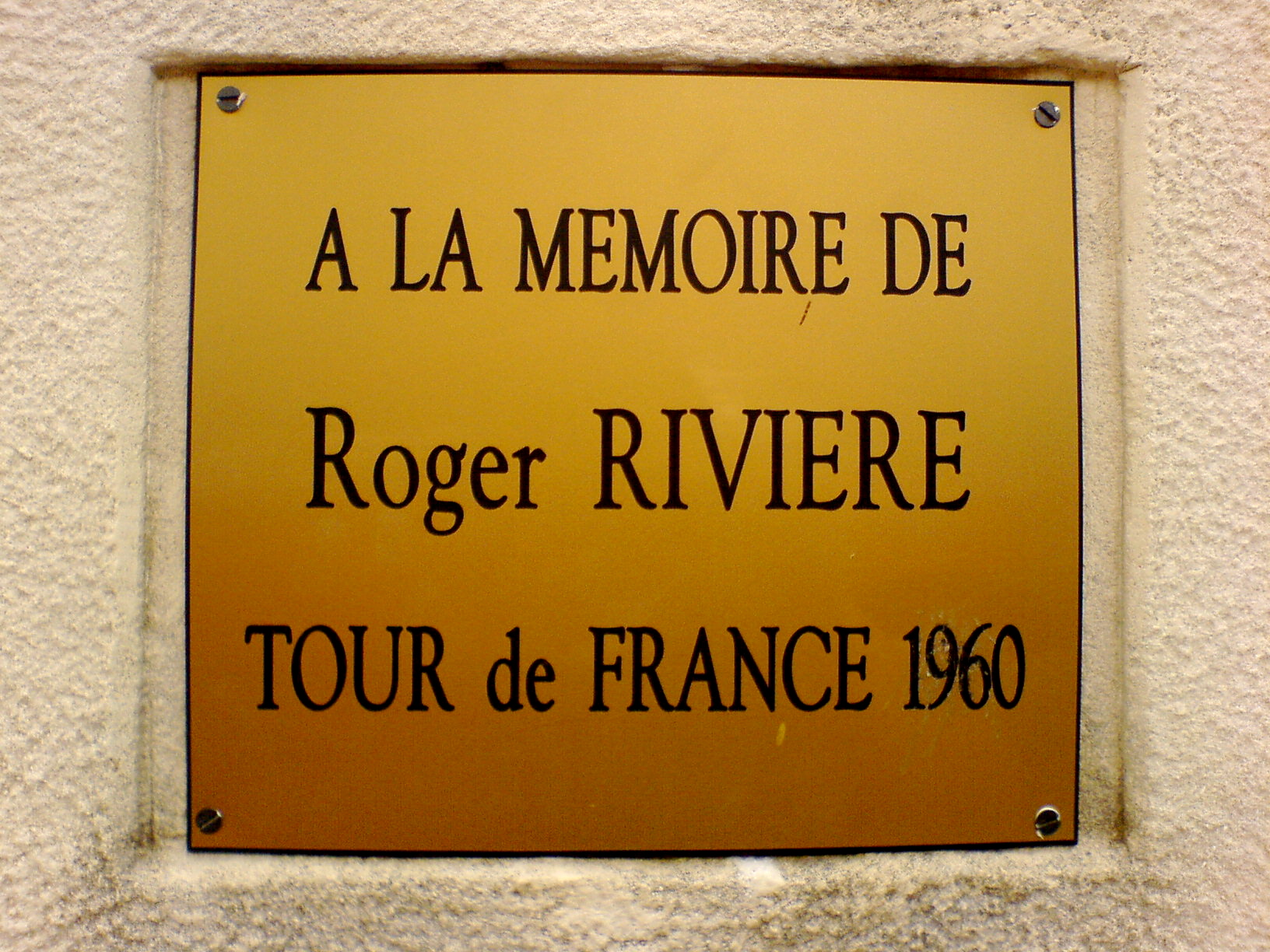

Rivière was one of 14 riding for France in 1960. It was his second participation and he had become one of the favourites. But his talent made him careless with training and what he ate. Rivière had a personal war with another French rider, Henry Anglade. Rivière won the opening time trial but Anglade had the yellow jersey of leadership by day six. Rivière took his revenge, even though they were in the same team, by attacking 112 km from the finish at Lorient. He beat Anglade by 14 minutes. Only a German, Hans Junkermann, Jean Adriaenssens of Belgium, and Gastone Nencini of Italy could stay with him. Rivière won the stage and Nencini the overall lead.

The Tour took the Perjuret on 10 July 1960 on a stage from Millau to Avignon. It had never previously been that way. Rivière followed Nencini wherever he went. He had only to hold him until the final time-trial and beat him by 1m 38s to win the Tour. On the zig-zags of the col de Perjuret, Nencini passed fourth with Rivière behind him. Nencini was known as the fastest descender in the world, famous for his dangerous and risky trajectories, and Rivière tried to follow him. He hit a low wall soon after the start of the descent and fell over it, rolling down the slope. A team-mate, Louis Rostollan, raised his hand to call the team manager, Marcel Bidot. He, journalists and officials found Rostollan peering into the ravine. Rivière's bike was nearby, its forks pushed back and its frame twisted. Rivière had broken his back. A helicopter took him to hospital in Montpellier.

Antoine Blondin wrote:

On a bend, we saw a rider, the tall Rostollan, making demented gestures and running back up the hill and shouting 'Roger has fallen! Roger has fallen!' It was impossible to stop on the gravelled toboggan on which we'd embarked. Nobody had seen Rivière disappear. For five minutes, we thought he had been vaporised, purely and simply crossed off the map of the world, of which the immense and chaotic landscape around us gave the scale. Well, he was lying 20 or so metres below with a broken spine that forbade him the slightest gesture, the least call. His head was resting on a bed of rocks, his eyes open to the mountainous (rugueuse) countryside that surrounded him.

When we managed to stop in the hamlet of Vanels to collect our breath, we still didn't know exactly what had happened, but anxiety showed on the faces of all who passed us. One by one, face after face, the event was written there... Finally, Radio Tour announced: 'Roger Rivière has been the victim of a serious accident'... The helicopter, which couldn't land on the steep slope where Rivière had ended up after his fall, turned above us in the way that vultures circle.

Doctors found pain-killers in Rivière's pockets and more in his body. Rivière nevertheless blamed his mechanic, saying his brakes were faulty. "I pulled them on but they didn't work." The brakes were examined and found to be faultless. He then said there was oil on his rims. He withdrew the accusation in face of criticism. He later sold the story of his drug use to a newspaper, admitting he had taken Palfium during the climb of the Perjuret, a painkiller that could have affected his reflexes and judgment. In 1961, Miroir du Cyclisme republished an article originally written for Libre Santé by Rivière's friend and dietician, Clarisse Brobecker. She confirmed the theory that Rivière was so numbed by painkillers that he either hadn't attempted to pull on the brakes or had been unable to.

Rivière admitted taking amphetamines and solucamphor during his hour record in 1958 – including tablets during the attempt. He said he had an injection of solucamphor and amphetamine before the start and swallowed several amphetamine tablets.

== Retirement and death ==
Rivière never regained full use of his limbs. He lived the rest of his life in a wheelchair, considered an 80 per cent invalid. He opened a restaurant in Saint-Etienne called 'Le Vigorelli', after the Velodromo Vigorelli track in Milan where he twice set the world hour record. It failed and he opened a garage, and finally a holiday camp in the Rhone Valley. Those too failed. "Rivière, who succeeded at the impossible, found the possible more difficult," said the writer, Olivier Dazat.

Rivière died of throat cancer at 40.

== Major results ==
1956
1st Tour d'Europe
1959
1st Mont Faron, 1st GP Alger (with Gérard Saint and Raphaël Géminiani)
2nd Grand Prix des Nations
3rd Critérium du Dauphiné Libéré
4th Overall Tour de France

1st Stages 6 (ITT) & 21 (ITT)

6th Overall Vuelta a España

1st Stages 1a (TTT), 13 (TTT), 14 (ITT) & 16

1960
1st GP Alger (with Rudi Altig)
Tour de France:

1st Stages 1b (ITT), 6 & 10
Rivière crashed on the 14th stage descending from Col de Perjuret (Route D996 – Meyrueis en Florac)

== Major track victories and records ==
1957
World Pursuit Championship
France national pursuit championship
World hour record (46.923km)
World 10 km record (12'31.8")
1958
World Pursuit Championship
World Hour Record (47.346km, unbroken until October 1967)
World 10 km record (12'22.8")
World 20 km record (twice: 25'15"; 24'50.6")
1959
World Pursuit Championship

== Signature bicycles ==
Gitane, Rivière's last sponsor, manufactured a Roger Rivière signature series of bicycles in the 1970s. The production of the Rivière line coincided with the 20th century "bike boom".

== See also ==
- List of doping cases in cycling

Records
Preceded by Ercole Baldini	UCI hour record (46.923 km); 18 September 1957 – 23 September 1959	Succeeded by himself
Preceded by himself	UCI hour record (47.347 km); 23 September 1959 – 30 October 1967	Succeeded by Ferdi Bracke
