= Graziano Battistini =

Italian cyclist (1936–1994)

Personal information
- Full name: Graziano Battistini
- Born: 12 May 1936 Fosdinovo, Italy
- Died: 22 January 1994 (aged 57) Arcola, Italy

Cycling career
- Sport: Cycling
- Discipline: Road
- Role: Rider

Major wins
- 2 stages Tour de France; 2 stages Giro d'Italia

Graziano Battistini (12 May 1936 – 22 January 1994) was an Italian professional road bicycle racer. In 1960, Battistini won two stages in the Tour de France, and finished in second place in the general classification. Battistini was the first rider to win the Cima Coppi, a prize honoring the late Fausto Coppi, by being the first rider to the summit of the Passo dello Stelvio in the 1965 Giro d'Italia.

== Major results ==
1958
1st Coppa Mobilio ITT
1959
5th GP Quarrata
7th Overall Giro d'Italia
1960
Coppa Sabatini
GP Saice
Tour de France:

Winner stages 7 and 16
2nd place overall classification

1962
Giro d'Italia:

Winner stage 2
Leading general classification for four days
8th place overall classification

1963
Giro d'Italia:

9th place overall classification

1965
Giro d'Italia:

Winner stage 20
