= Gastone Nencini =

Italian cyclist

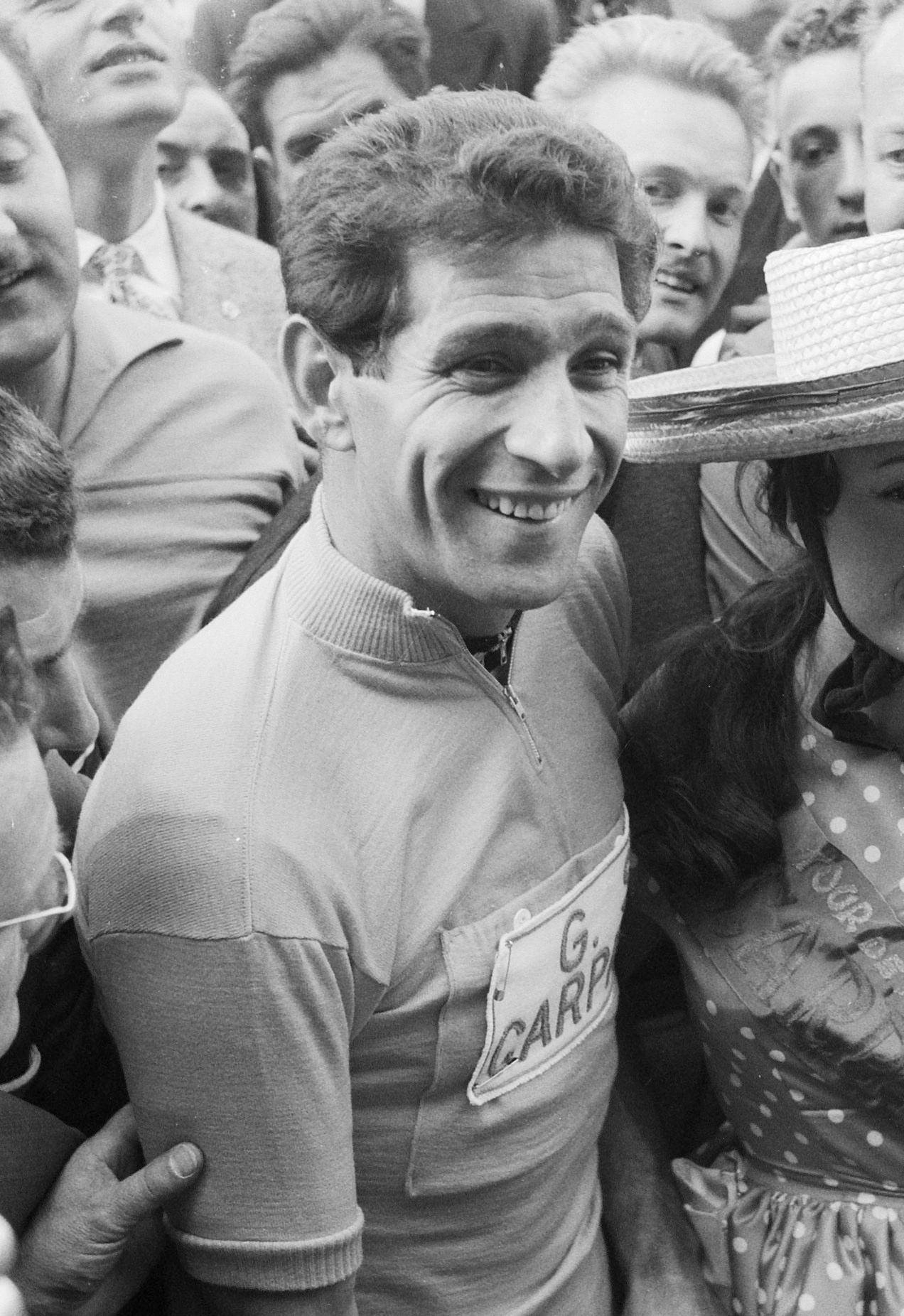
- Nencini at the 1960 Tour de France

Personal information
- Full name: Gastone Nencini
- Nicknames: Il Leone del Mugello; Faccia di fatica (Fatigue-face)
- Born: 1 March 1930 Barberino di Mugello, Italy
- Died: 1 February 1980 (aged 49) Florence, Italy

Cycling career
- Sport: Cycling
- Discipline: Road
- Role: Rider

Professional teams
- 1953–1954: Legnano–Pirelli
- 1955–1958: Leo–Chlorodont
- 1959–1960: Carpano
- 1961–1962: Ignis
- 1963–1965: Springoil–Fuchs

Major wins
- Grand Tours Tour de France General classification (1960) Mountains classification (1957) 4 individual stages (1956, 1957, 1958) Giro d'Italia General classification (1957) Mountains classification (1955) 7 individual stages (1955, 1958, 1959, 1960) 1 TTT stage (1956)
Medal record
Men's road bicycle racing
Representing Italy
World Championships
Silver medal – second place	1953 Lugano	Amateur's Road Race

Gastone Nencini (Italian pronunciation: [ɡaˈstoːne nenˈtʃiːni]; 1 March 1930 – 1 February 1980) was an Italian road racing cyclist who won the 1960 Tour de France and the 1957 Giro d'Italia.

Nicknamed Il Leone del Mugello, "The Lion of Mugello" (from his birthplace Barberino di Mugello, near Florence), Nencini was a powerful all-rounder, particularly strong in the mountains.

He was an amateur painter and a chain smoker. He was a gifted descender. "The only reason to follow Nencini downhill would be if you had a death wish", said the French rider Raphaël Géminiani. It was in trying to follow Nencini down a mountain on Stage 14 of the 1960 Tour de France that Roger Rivière missed a bend, crashed over a wall and broke his spine.

== Downhill race ==
Nencini's downhill race with Henry Anglade has become part of the legend of cycling. They met at a col in the Dolomites during the Giro d'Italia. The weather was bad, and a snowstorm had forced 57 riders to abandon that day. Anglade said:

I couldn't tolerate the idea that Nencini was the best descender of the peloton. I said to him, call the blackboard man, we'll do the descent together and whoever comes second pays for the aperitifs this evening. So he called the ardoisier and asked him to follow us. The road was of compressed earth. We attacked the drop flat out. I let Nencini take the lead so that I could see how he negotiated the bends before attacking him. In the end I dropped as though I was alone. At the bottom, I had taken 32 seconds out of him, written on the blackboard. I was really tickled. I had beaten Nencini. The next time I saw him was that evening in the hotel I was staying at. He had just bought me an apéritif!

== Memory ==
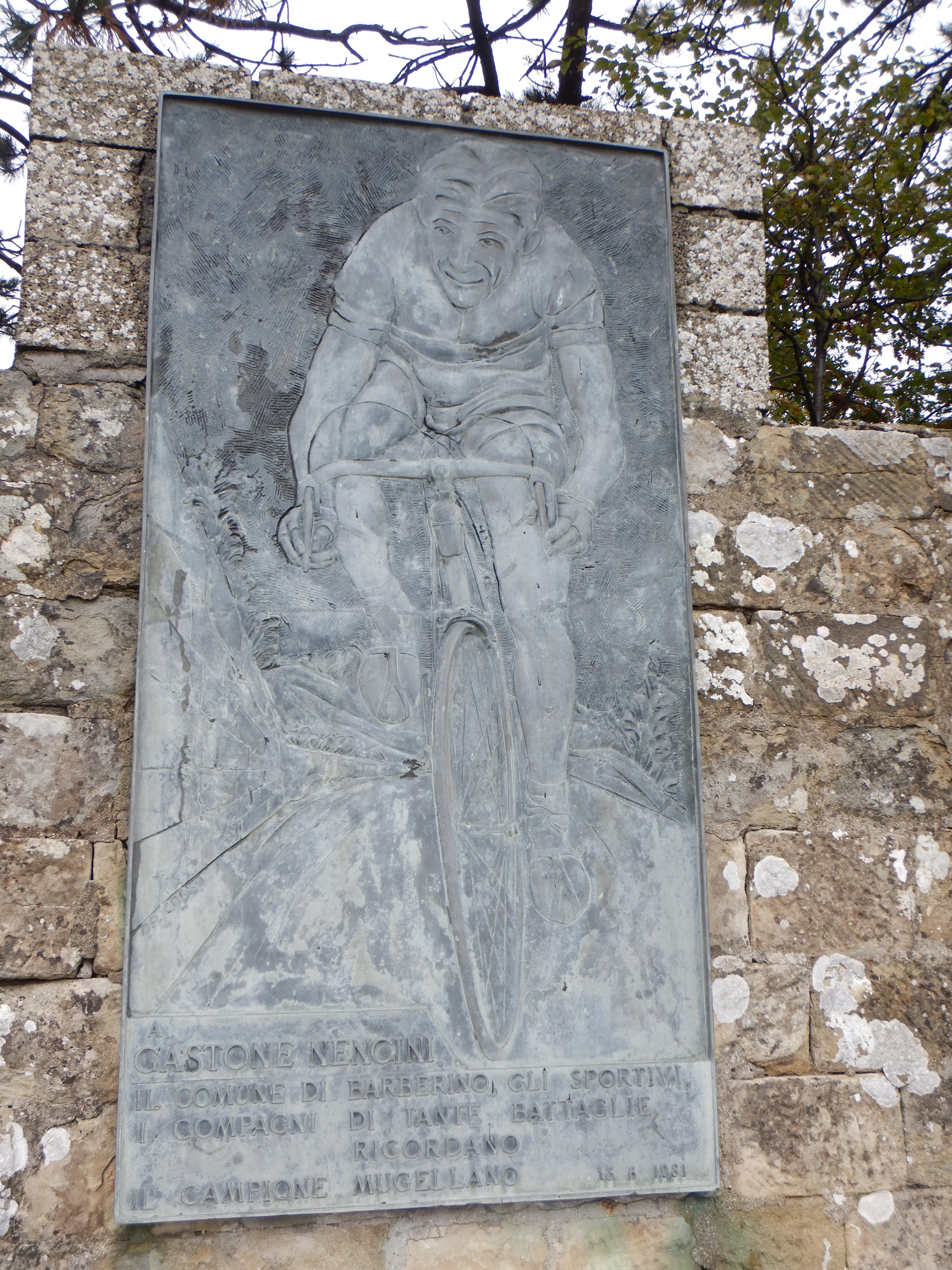
Monument at Futa pass

At the Futa pass, on the mountains over his native Barberino di Mugello, a monument is placed to his memory: a big bronze bas-relief portrait of him racing and the inscription saying: "A Gastone Nencini. Il comune di Barberino, gli sportivi, i compagni di tante battaglie ricordano il campione mugellano" (translated from Italian: "To Gastone Nencini. The administration of Barberino, the sportsmen, the comrades of many battles remember the Mugello-born champion").

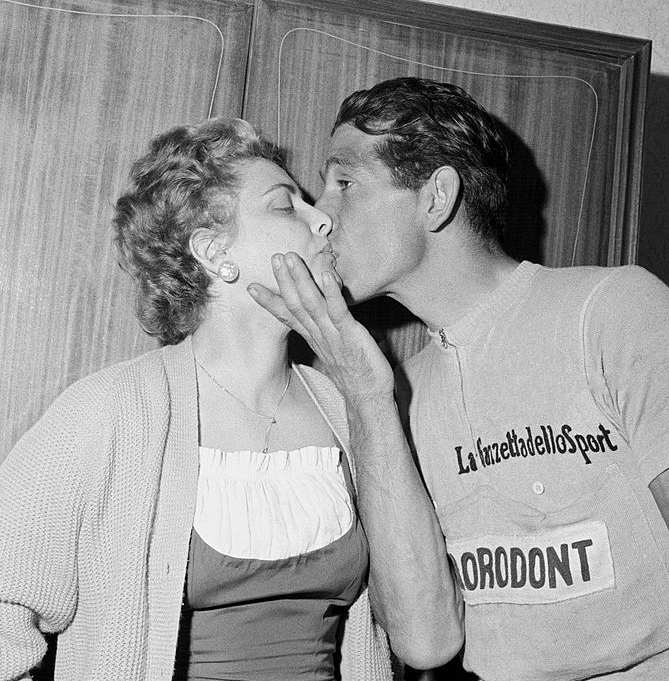
Gastone Nencini with wife Bianca, wearing the pink jersey from the Giro d'Italia 1957

== Major results ==
1953
2nd Road race, UCI World Amateur Championships
1954
4th GP di Prato
5th Giro dell'Emilia
1955
3rd Overall Giro d'Italia

1st Mountains classification
1st Stages 9 & 12
Held after Stages 15–19

4th Road race, UCI Road World Championships
1956
1st Tre Valli Varesine
1st Stage 22 Tour de France
1st Stage 2b (TTT) Giro d'Italia
3rd Giro di Campania
7th Giro della Provincia di Reggio Calabria
1957
1st Overall Giro d'Italia
1st Giro della Provincia di Reggio Calabria
3rd Giro di Campania
3rd Giro del Lazio
4th Road race, National Road Championships
6th Overall Tour de France

1st Mountains classification
1st Stages 10 & 18

6th Tour of Flanders
9th Overall Vuelta a España
1958
5th Overall Tour de France

1st Stage 19

5th Overall Giro d'Italia

1st Stages 10 & 18

5th Giro della Provincia di Reggio Calabria
8th GP di Prato
1959
2nd Overall Gran Premio Ciclomotoristico

1st Stage 6

3rd Overall Giro di Sardegna
6th Overall Paris–Nice
9th Giro di Toscana
10th Overall Giro d'Italia

1st Stage 9

1960
1st Overall Tour de France

Held after Stages 1b–3

2nd Overall Giro d'Italia

1st Stages 5 & 10

2nd Giro di Campania
2nd Giro della Provincia di Reggio Calabria
3rd Milano–Torino
5th Overall Giro di Sardegna
5th Giro di Toscana
8th Road race, National Road Championships
8th Giro del Lazio
9th GP di Prato
10th Giro della Romagna
1961
2nd Trofeo Matteotti
3rd Overall Tre Giorni del Sud
7th Giro dell'Emilia
8th Tre Valli Varesine
8th Road race, UCI Road World Championships
1962
2nd Giro dell'Appennino
5th Overall Giro di Sardegna
8th Sassari-Cagliari
1963
5th Giro di Campania
7th GP di Prato
10th Giro della Provincia di Reggio Calabria
1964
2nd Züri-Metzgete
3rd Overall Tour de Romandie
8th Giro della Provincia di Reggio Calabria
1965
7th Grand Prix de Cannes

=== General classification results timeline ===
Grand Tour general classification results
Grand Tour	1953	1954	1955	1956	1957	1958	1959	1960	1961	1962	1963	1964	1965
Vuelta a España	Not held		18	—	9	DNF	—	—	—	—	—	—	—
Giro d'Italia	—	16	3	DNF	1	5	10	2	—	13	DNF	—	—
Tour de France	—	—	—	22	6	5	—	1	—	DNF	—	—	—

Legend
—	Did not compete
DNF	Did not finish

== See also ==
- List of doping cases in cycling
