= Raymond Mastrotto =

French cyclist

Personal information
- Full name: Raymond Mastrotto
- Born: 1 November 1934 Auch, France
- Died: 11 March 1984 (aged 49) Labatut, France

Cycling career
- Sport: Cycling
- Discipline: Road
- Role: Rider

Major wins
- Critérium du Dauphiné Libéré (1962)

Raymond Mastrotto (Auch, 1 November 1934 — Labatut, 11 March 1984) was a French professional road bicycle racer. In 1962, Mastrotto won the Critérium du Dauphiné Libéré. At the end of his career, in 1967, he also won a stage of the 1967 Tour de France. In 1968, Mastrotto had to end his career after he was hit by a motorist during a training.

== Major results ==
1960
Circuit des cols Pyrénéens
Tour de France:

6th place overall classification

1961
Villard de Lans
1962
Critérium du Dauphiné Libéré
1963
Sauvignes
1966
Boucles du Bas-Limousin
1967
Tour de France:

Winner stage 17
