= Camille Le Menn =

French cyclist

Personal information
- Born: 23 February 1934 (age 92) Brest, France

Cycling career
- Sport: Cycling
- Role: Rider

Camille Le Menn (born 23 February 1934) is a French former professional racing cyclist. He rode in four editions of the Tour de France.
