= Martin van der Borgh =

Dutch cyclist (1934–2018)

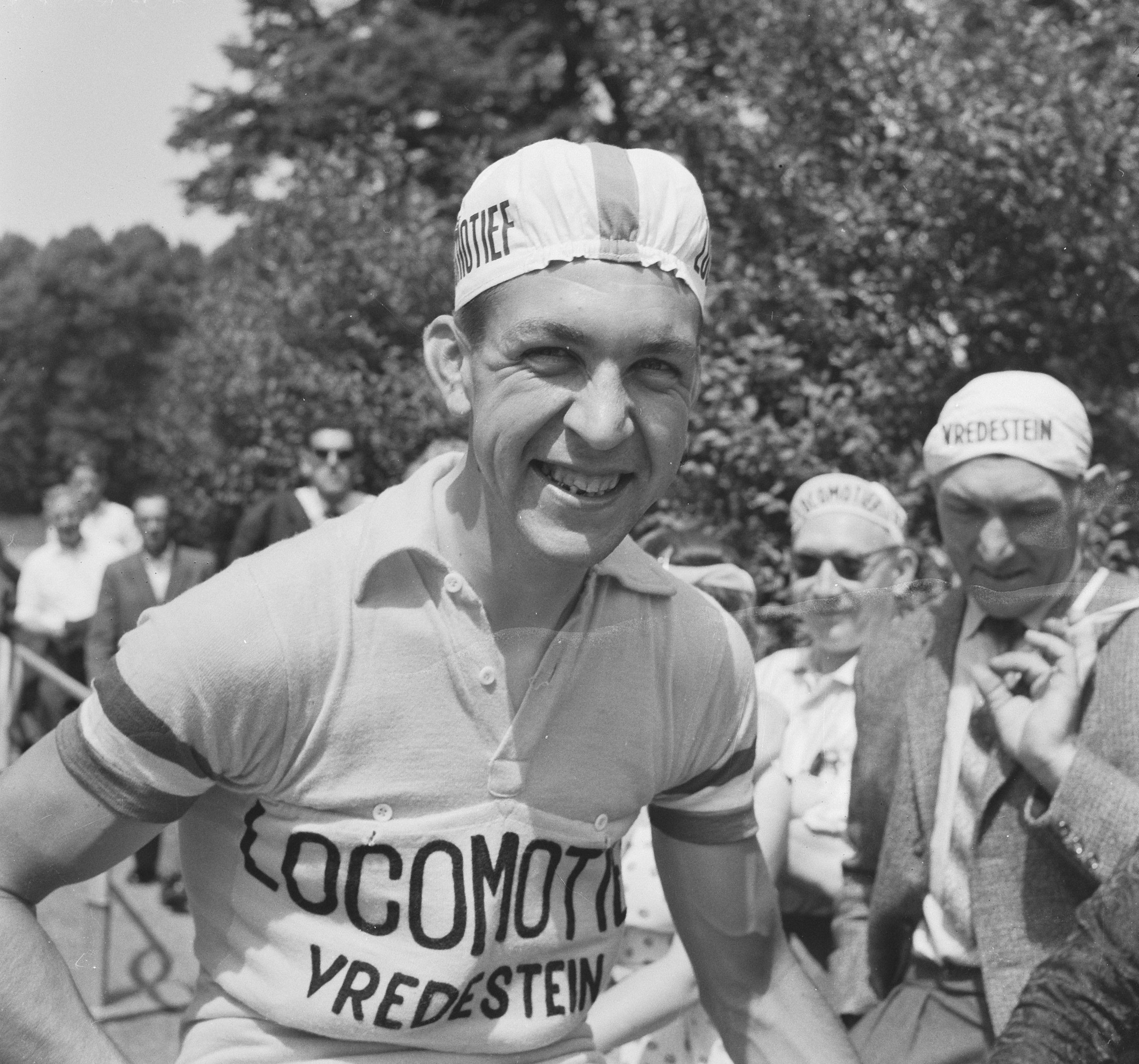
- Martin van der Borgh in 1959

Personal information
- Born: 28 October 1934 Koningsbosch, the Netherlands
- Died: 12 February 2018 (aged 83) Brunssum, the Netherlands

Sport
- Sport: Cycling
Medal record
Representing the Netherlands
UCI Road World Championships
Bronze medal – third place	1954 Sollingen	Road race

Martin van der Borgh (28 October 1934 – 12 February 2018) was a Dutch cyclist who was active between 1954 and 1964. He won the Ronde van Limburg (1954), Tour du Nord (1961) and individual stages of the Tour de France (1960) and Tour de Luxembourg (1958, 1963). He also won the bronze medal in the road race at the 1954 UCI Road World Championships.

He was born in Koningsbosch and died, aged 83, in Brunssum.
