= Bernard Viot =

French cyclist (1937–2022)

Personal information
- Born: 9 August 1937 Apremont, Oise, France
- Died: 27 November 2022 (aged 85)

Cycling career
- Sport: Cycling
- Role: Rider

Bernard Viot (French: [bɛʁnaʁ vjo]; 9 August 1937 – 27 November 2022) was a French professional racing cyclist. He rode in three editions of the Tour de France.

Viot died on 27 November 2022, at the age of 85.
