= Henry Anglade =

French cyclist (1933–2022)

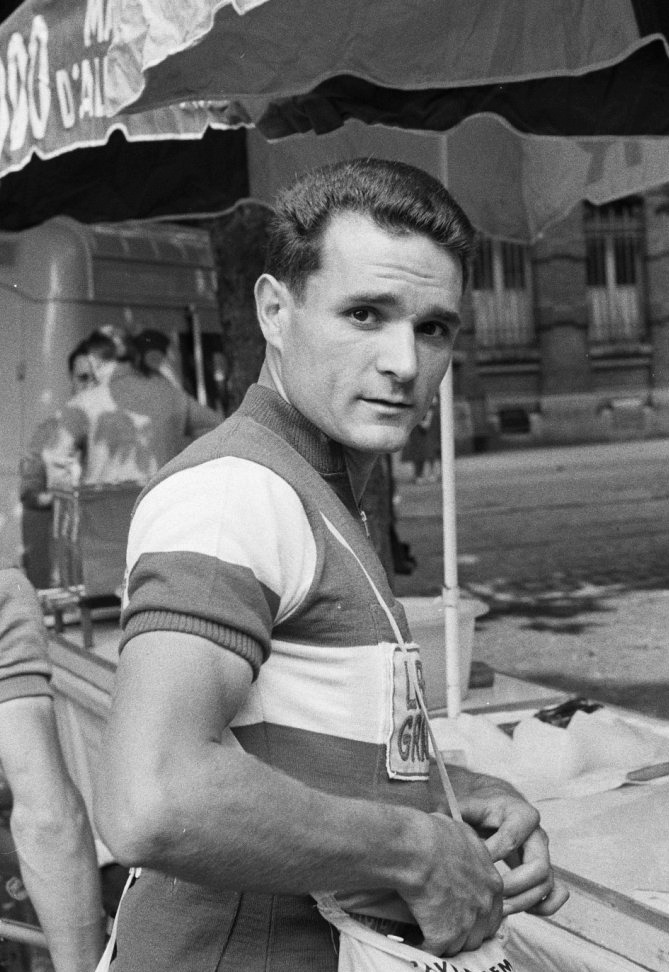
- Anglade in 1960

Personal information
- Full name: Henry Anglade
- Nickname: Napoléon
- Born: 6 July 1933 Thionville, France
- Died: 10 November 2022 (aged 89) Lyon, France

Cycling career
- Sport: Cycling
- Discipline: Road
- Role: Rider
- Rider type: Allround

Amateur team
- –: Vélo Club du Griffon

Professional teams
- 1956: Alcyon–Dunlop
- 1957–1962: Hutchinson–D'Alessandro
- 1963–1966: Pelforth–Sauvage–Lejeune
- 1967: Mercier–BP–Hutchinson

Managerial team
- 1976–1978: Lejeune–BP

Major wins
- French National Road Race Champion (2x); Dauphiné Libéré; 1 stage, Tour de France (1959)

Henry Anglade (6 July 1933 – 10 November 2022) was a French cyclist. In 1959 he was closest to winning the Tour de France, when he won a stage and finished second, 4:01 behind Federico Bahamontes. In 1960 he wore the yellow jersey for two days while finishing 8th overall. He placed in the top five of the Tour on two additional occasions in 1964 and 1965.

== Origins ==
Henry Anglade was born in Thionville, in the Lorraine region of France close to the German border, the son of a soldier. His family moved south to Lyon at the start of the Second World War. There he went to school with a boy called André Camus who went cycling on Sundays and on Thursday afternoons. Anglade turned down his invitation to join him. It was his father who suggested that he should go, offering him the heavy family bicycle "that weighed at least 25kg". He joined Camus and his friends and found they couldn't keep up. One suggested he should try racing and he joined the Vélo Club du Griffon, the oldest club in Lyon. That was when he bought himself a Longoni sports bike and tried racing.

Anglade worked with an engineering company until he could support himself from racing.

== Professional racing ==
Anglade turned professional in 1957. In 1959, he won the Dauphiné Libéré, a mountainous stage race over a week; then the national road championship. He came second in the Tour de Suisse and then in the Tour de France, behind Federico Bahamontes but in front of Jacques Anquetil and Roger Rivière. In that Tour, Anglade – riding for the regional Centre-Midi team – was the victim of the tactics of Anquetil, Rivière and others in the French national team. They preferred to see Bahamontes take the Tour de France rather than Anglade, who was unpopular among French riders and, had he won the Tour de France, would have earned more than Anquetil and Rivière in the post-Tour criteriums that were then an important part of riders' incomes. Bahamontes was both Spanish and a poor rider in round-the-houses races and so of little threat. On top of that, Anquetil, Rivière and many other French stars were represented by Daniel Dousset, one of the two agents who divided French cycling, whereas Anglade was represented by the other, Roger Piel. That was why Anglade had been left out of the national team to ride for a regional one.

At the stage finish in Grenoble, Dousset was there to meet Fausto Coppi, who was Bahamontes' sponsor, and the riders in the national team whom he represented. Émile Besson wrote in L'Humanité: "Dousset offered contracts for criteriums by the shovel load for after the Tour of Spain. Anglade's head, second in Paris, had fallen." Fans worked out what was going on and Anquetil was whistled and jeered as he entered the Parc des Princes on the last day. Anglade said: "I've got no regrets about it. Racing is like that. And anyway I make it a principle to live without regrets."

Anglade was not the strongest of riders but made up for what he lacked with a good tactical sense. He was an eloquent speaker and popular with journalists. Riders, however, disliked him for what they perceived as his bossiness and gave him the nickname Napoleon, which referred as well to his smallness.

Anglade joined the Pelforth-Sauvage-Lejeune in 1963 and finished the next year's Tour de France in fourth place, behind Anquetil, Raymond Poulidor and Bahamontes. He also came fourth in the 1965 race, behind Felice Gimondi, Poulidor and Gianni Motta.

Anglade's health disturbed his 1966 season and he spent his last season, 1967, as a team rider for Raymond Poulidor. He rode in ten editions of the Tour de France and finished all but his last. His places in the general classification were always in the top 20 aside from his first Tour where he finished 28th, but thereafter he finished 17th, 2nd, 8th, 18th, 12th, 11th, 4th and 4th.

=== 1959 national championship ===
The 1959 national championship used the car racing circuit at Montlhéry. Anglade was in a leading group with five laps left. Louison Bobet was leading the chase. The commissaires had got as far as clearing following cars out of the way so that the chasers could regain the leaders. Anglade dropped to the back of his group, had something to eat, and set off alone when Bobet and the others were nearly on them. The others hesitated and the chasers eased up when the two groups came together. Anglade was convinced he'd won and eased up with 100m left to raise his hands in victory.

"He thought he'd won," said a report, "and sat up to salute the crowd. L'impudent! He had barely crossed the line when he was passed by Jean Forestier and René Privat, who had also broken away and were sprinting for second place."

=== 1965 national championship ===
The Pelforth team met the night before the championship at a hotel near the circuit. The manager, Maurice de Muer, said: "Anyone intending to be champion of France, raise a hand." Four put up their hands, including Georges Groussard and Anglade. Anglade said: "Right, that's three too many. You three who fancy the jersey, I consider you adversaries. As for the rest of you with no particular ambitions, ride for me because I'm going to be French champion."

Another Pelforth rider, Hubert Ferrer, broke away alone for 170 km. He was caught 30 km from the line. The peloton was tired from chasing and repeated attacks. Raymond Delisle went away when Ferrer was caught. Anglade caught him, the two stayed together for a while and then Anglade went away alone with five laps to go. He said:

I knew that behind me, Jacques Anquetil and Raymond Poulidor would be neutralising each other, so I decided to keep the peloton at a minute. I realised quickly that I had a friend in the announcer. I could hear the loudspeakers perfectly right round the course and when he said '55 seconds', I accelerated. When I heard '1m 5s', I eased back a bit to recover. It worked so well that I crossed the line a minute and five seconds ahead of Poulidor and Anquetil.

=== General de Gaulle ===
Anglade was in the French national jersey when the race stopped unexpectedly at Colombey-les-deux-Églises to greet Charles de Gaulle, the president, in his village. Anglade said:

I had stopped to relieve myself. I was just coming back up through the following cars when Jacques Goddet called me to say that the General was on the course. He asked me 'Could you imagine stopping?', a strange question to ask me, Napoleon, given that I used to get fined if I put a foot down on the road. I said we could stop but provided there was no penalty. I went up to the front of the race to warn the leaders, Nencini, Adriaenssens. In the wood of La Boisserie [de Gaulle's estate] the bodyguards were already across the road, and so we all stopped. The general came down the slope, he greeted me first and then Nencini, telling him he was going to win, and then he went back and we set off again. I often wondered why he had spoken to me first and then later I got the answer. The General was vising Lyon and I was one of those invited. The chef du protocole introduced me and the General said 'One does not introduce Henry Anglade'. I asked him why and he said 'You were wearing our flag and I owed it to you' [je vous devais bien ça].

It was the first time the Tour had stopped during a stage.

=== Downhill race ===
Anglade's downhill race with Gastone Nencini has become part of the legend of cycling. Anglade was a proud rider and Nencini one of the fastest down hills. "The only reason to follow Nencini down mountains is if you have a death wish," was how Raphaël Géminiani put it. It was in trying to follow Nencini down a mountain that Roger Rivière missed a bend, crashed over a wall and broke his spine.

Anglade and Nencini met at a col in the Dolomites during the Giro d'Italia. The weather was bad and a snowstorm had forced 57 riders to abandon that day. Anglade said:

I couldn't tolerate the idea that Nencini was the best descender of the peloton. I said to him, call the blackboard man, we'll do the descent together and whoever comes second pays for the aperitifs this evening. So he called the ardoisier and asked him to follow us. The road was of compressed earth. We attacked the drop flat out. I let Nencini take the lead so that I could see how he negotiated the bends before attacking him. In the end I dropped as though I was alone. At the bottom, I had taken 32 seconds out of him, written on the blackboard. I was really tickled. I had beaten Nencini. The next time I saw him was that evening in the hotel I was staying at. He had just bought me an apéritif!

=== Doping ===
Anglade raced at a time when riders made much of their income in the criterium races, for which they were paid start money as well as prizes, that followed the Tour de France. In 1967, in the concern about doping that followed the death of Tom Simpson in the Tour four months earlier, Anglade said: "I've driven 4,000km in three days, I've ridden 400km of race with only six hours in bed. Do you think I could have done that contenting myself with drinking lemonade?"

== Retirement ==
Anglade crashed in a criterium at Montélimar in 1966 and broke his spine. He said:

I was mixing it with Raymond Poulidor [on s'amusait à se tirer la bourre avec Poulidor]. I was in front and he was trying to join me. We were approaching a bend and I stepped on the gas and unfortunately my pedal touched the road. I flew off the bike: fractured vertebral column. I was at the end of my contract with Pelforth and it wasn't being renewed. Antonin Magne, the manager of Mercier, going through Roger Piel, my agent, opened the door for me. For me it was a real pleasure. But I never really came back to my old level. So I wrote a letter of resignation, explaining that I didn't deserve to be paid to be a racer. Magne phoned me: he'd never seen such a thing. The book of my career closed.

Anglade left cycling on 13 September to work for the Olympia-Werke typewriter company with one of his cousins. He wanted no more to do with cycling until, in 1975, the Lejeune brothers who ran a bike factory in Paris and sponsored a team invited him to join. He managed Lejeune-BP in three Tours de France, where he managed Roy Schuiten, Ferdinand Bracke and Lucien Van Impe. He said the team lacked leaders and wasn't a success.

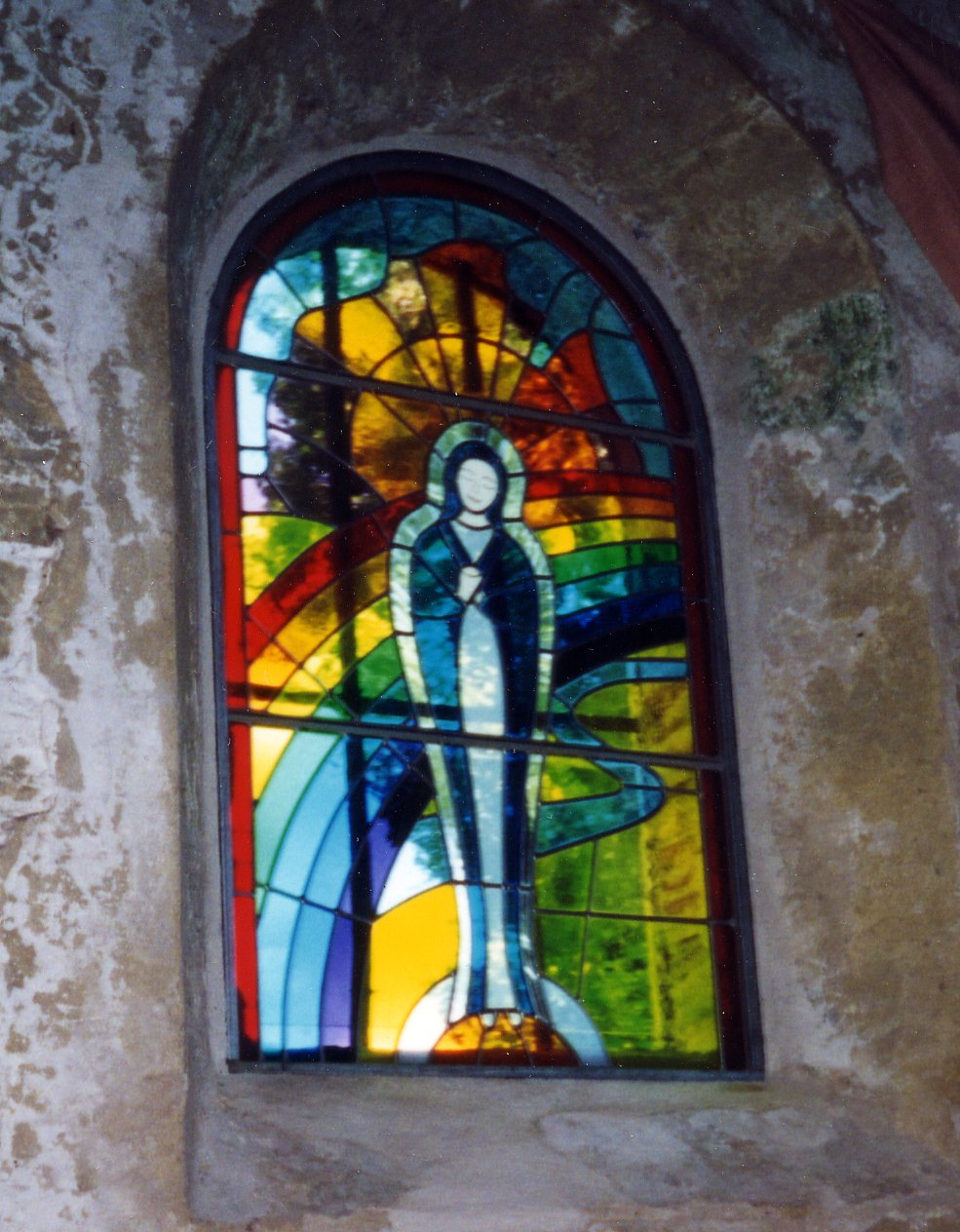
Stained-glass window at the Notre Dame des Cyclistes

Anglade learned how to make stained-glass windows and designed and created those in the cyclists' chapel, Notre Dame des Cyclistes at Labastide-d'Armagnac in the Landes. He said:

Ever since I was really tiny, I have always admired stained-glass windows. When I was a choir boy, I couldn't follow the Mass because I was in ecstasy in front of a window. Somehow I had it in my skin. Five years ago I went to a demonstration of how the windows were made and I flipped. I signed on for more. I made a window of the Virgin, which I gave to Father Massié for the 40th anniversary of the Notre Dame des Cyclistes at La Bastide d'Armagnac. I was really proud and happy.

The professional cyclist's habit of endorsing commercial products never left him. In 2008, he endorsed the brand of hearing aid that he wore.

== Major results ==
1957
Annemasse-Bellegarde-Annemasse
Tour de Champagne 4th stage
1958
Tour de Loire 1st stage
1959
France national road cycling champion
Tour de France:

Winner stage 13
2nd place overall classification

Dauphiné Libéré
Circuit Drôme-Ardèche
1960
Tour de France:

Wearing yellow jersey for two days
8th place overall classification

1961
Tour de l'Aude: Stages 1 and 2
Bern-Genève: Final classification, stages 1 and 2
Prix des Sables-d'Olonne
1962
Tour de Romandie: stage 2
1963
Tour du Var
1964
Prix de Vayrac.
Tour de France:

4th place overall classification

1965
France national road cycling champion
Tour de France:

4th place overall classification

Grand Prix du Parisien
1966
Tour de l'Hérault
