= René Strehler =

Swiss cyclist (born 1934)

Personal information
- Full name: René Strehler
- Born: 13 April 1934 (age 92) Switzerland

Cycling career
- Sport: Cycling
- Disciplines: Road, track
- Role: Rider

Major wins
- Tour de Romandie (1955)
Medal record
Representing Switzerland
Men's track cycling
Silver medal – second place	1955 Milan	Professional Pursuit

René Strehler (born 13 April 1934 in Affoltern am Albis) is a Swiss former professional racing cyclist. He was the Swiss National Road Race champion in 1960.

== Major results ==
1953
1st, National Track Championship, Amateur Pursuit
1st, National Road Championships, Amateurs

1954
1st, National Track Championship, Amateur Pursuit

1955
1st, Stage 6, Tour de Suisse
2nd, Pursuit, UCI Track Cycling World Championships
1st, Overall, Tour de Romandie

1st, Stage 1
3rd, Stage 2
1st, Stage 3a

1956
Tour de Suisse

1st, Stage 1
1st, Stage 3
1st, Stage 8

3rd, Overall, Tour de Romandie

2nd, Stage 1
1st, Stage 2
3rd, Stage 3b
2nd, Stage 4

1960
1st, Bern-Genève
1st, National Road Championships
3rd, Overall, Tour de Suisse

2nd, Stage 4

1st, Berner Rundfahrt
