= List of teams and cyclists in the 1962 Tour de France =

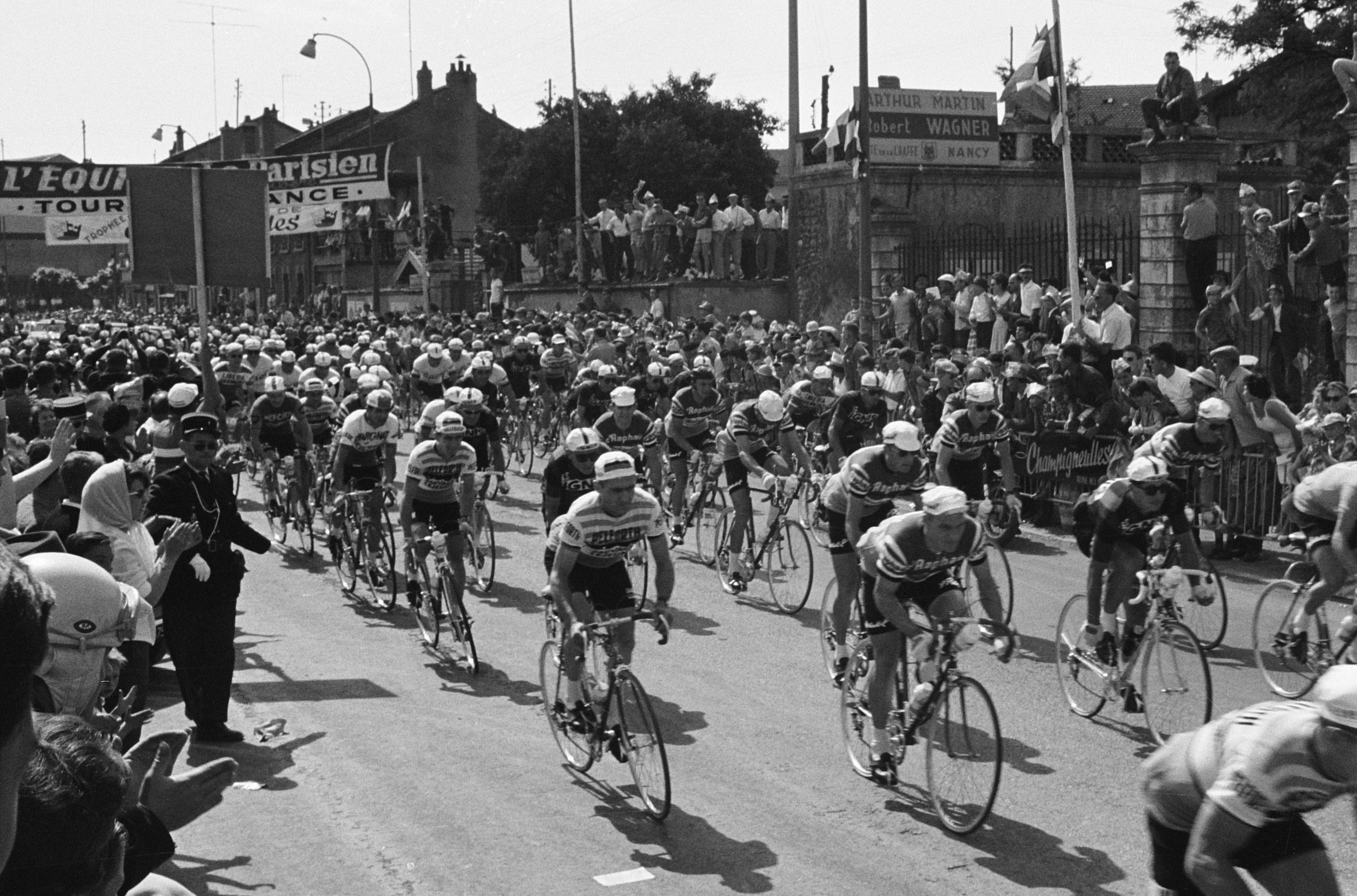
The peloton (main group) at the start of the 1962 Tour de France in Nancy

The 1962 Tour de France was the 49th edition of the Tour de France, one of cycling's Grand Tours. The three-week 4,274-kilometre (2,656 mi) race of 22 stages, including two split stages, started in Nancy on 24 June and finished at the Parc des Princes in Paris on 15 July.

From 1930 to 1961, the Tour de France was contested by national teams, but in 1962 commercially sponsored international trade teams returned. (Note: The Tour's director, founder of the race Henri Desgrange, who had always wanted the race to be won on individual strength, changed it from commercially sponsored international trade teams to individuals for the 1929 race. Alcyon–Dunlop rider Maurice De Waele won the race although he was unwell, and Desgrange believed he was illegally helped by his teammates so changed it to national teams for the 1930 Tour, conceding that he could not keep team tactics out of the race, but could prevent commercial team tactics.) From the late-1950s to 1962, the Tour had seen the absence of top riders who had bowed to pressure from their teams' extra-sportif (non-cycling industry) sponsors to ride other races that better suited their brands. This, and a demand for wider advertising from a declining bicycle industry, led to the reintroduction of the trade team format. In early February 1962, 22 teams submitted applications for the race, with the final list of 15 announced at the end of the month. The Spanish-based Kas was the first choice reserve team.

Each of the 15 teams consisted of 10 cyclists (150 total), an increase from the 1961 Tour, which had 11 teams of 12 cyclists (132 total). Each team was required to have a dominant nationality; at least six cyclists should have the same nationality, or only two nationalities should be present. For the first time, French cyclists were outnumbered; the largest number of riders from a nation came from Italy (52), with the next largest coming from France (50) and Belgium (28). Riders represented a further six nations, all European. Of the start list of 150, (Note: The leader of the Legnano–Pirelli team, Graziano Battistini, was listed on the start list, but he withdrew from the Tour before stage one and was not replaced. Although he was cleared to race by the Tour's doctor, Pierre Dumas, Battistini thought he was suffering from azotemia. His team manager, Eberardo Pavesi, allowed him to make his own decision.) 66 were riding the Tour de France for the first time. The total number of riders that finished the race was 94, a record high to that point. The average age of riders in the race was 27.5 years, ranging from the 21-year-old Tiziano Galvanin (Legnano–Pirelli) to the 40-year-old Pino Cerami (Peugeot–BP–Dunlop). The Legnano–Pirelli cyclists had the youngest average age while Margnat–Paloma–D'Alessandro cyclists had the oldest. The presentation of the teams – where the members of each team's roster are introduced in front of the media and local dignitaries – took place outside the Place de la Carrière in Nancy before the start of the opening stage held in the city.

Rudi Altig of Saint-Raphaël–Helyett–Hutchinson was the first rider to wear the general classification's yellow jersey after winning the first stage. Altig lost it the following day to André Darrigade of Gitane–Leroux–Dunlop–R. Geminiani, who won stage 2a, before regaining it after winning stage three. The race lead was taken by Altig's teammate Albertus Geldermans after stage six. He held it for two stages, before Darrigade took it back for the next two. Flandria–Faema–Clément rider Willy Schroeders then led the race from the end of stage nine to the end of eleven, at which point Schroeder's teammate Rik Van Looy, a major pre-race favourite, abandoned the race with an injury. The following day, British rider Tom Simpson of Gitane–Leroux became the first from outside mainland Europe to wear the yellow jersey. He lost it after stage thirteen's individual time trial in the Pyrenees to Flandria's Jef Planckaert, who then held it for seven stages, which included the Alps. Jacques Anquetil of Saint-Raphaël won the individual time trial of stage twenty to put himself into the yellow jersey, which he held until the conclusion of the race; he defended his title, winning his third Tour de France. Planckaert finished second in the general classification, 4 min and 59 s in arrears, with Mercier–BP–Hutchinson rider Raymond Poulidor third, over ten minutes behind Anquetil. Altig won the points classification and Margnat's Federico Bahamontes won the mountains classification. Saint-Raphaël won the team classification. The overall awards for most combative and unluckiest were given to Eddy Pauwels of Wiel's–Groene Leeuw and Van Looy respectively. Altig and Philco's Emile Daems won the most stages, with three each.

== Teams ==
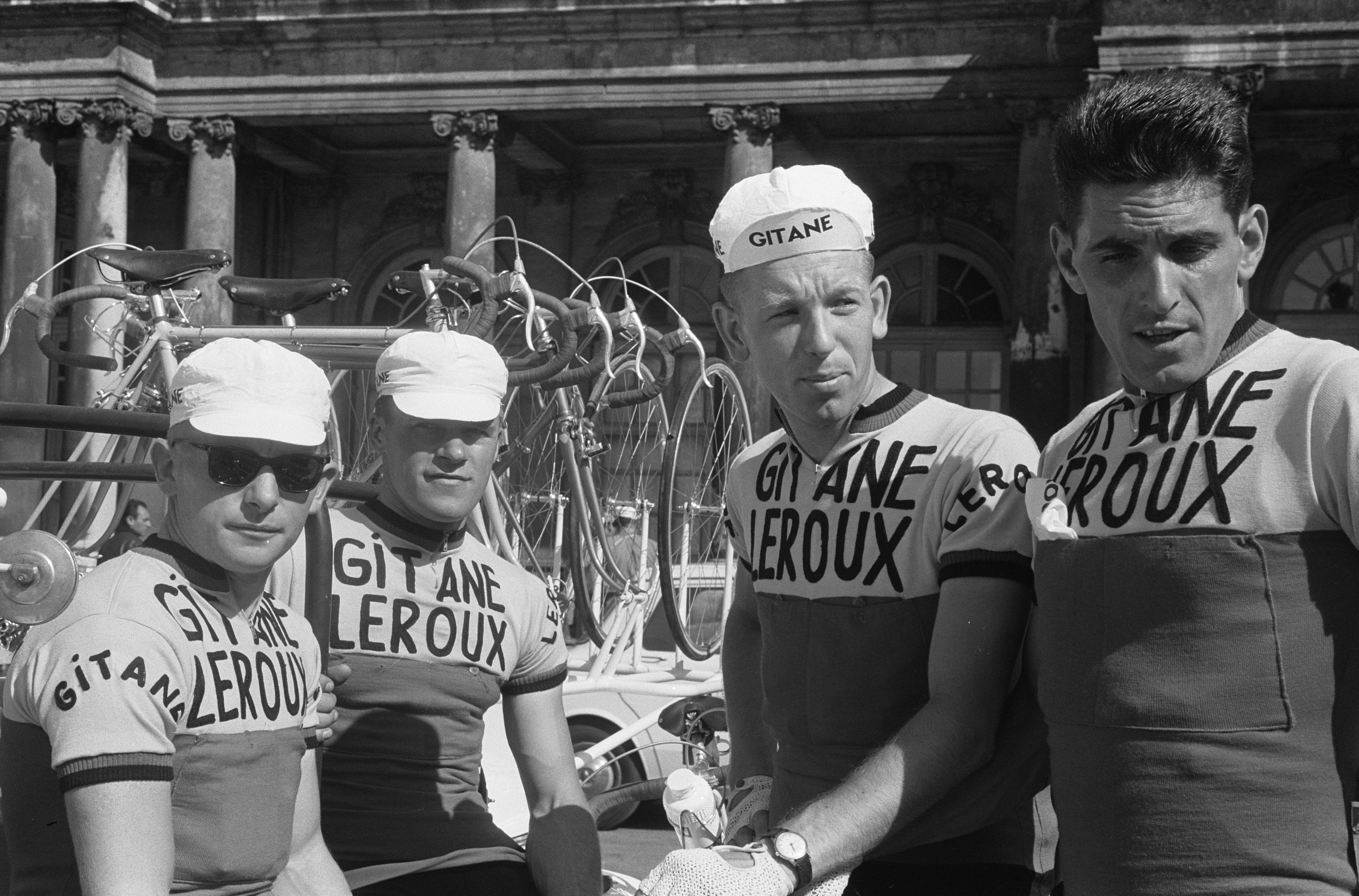
Gitane–Leroux–Dunlop–R. Geminiani riders Gérard Thiélin, Anatole Novak, Bas Maliepaard and Jean Forestier, before the first stage

Majority of French cyclists

- Saint-Raphaël–Helyett–Hutchinson (riders)
- Liberia–Grammont–Wolber (riders)
- Pelforth–Sauvage–Lejeune (riders)
- Gitane–Leroux–Dunlop–R. Geminiani (riders)
- Margnat–Paloma–D'Alessandro (riders)
- Peugeot–BP–Dunlop (riders)
- Mercier–BP–Hutchinson (riders)

Majority of Italian cyclists

- Ignis–Moschettieri (riders)
- Ghigi (riders)
- Gazzola–Fiorelli–Hutchinson (riders)
- Carpano (riders)
- Legnano–Pirelli (riders)
- Philco (riders)

Majority of Belgian cyclists

- Wiel's–Groene Leeuw (riders)
- Flandria–Faema–Clément (riders)

== Cyclists ==
Legend
No.	Starting number worn by the rider during the Tour
Pos.	Position in the general classification
Time	Deficit to the winner of the general classification
*	Denotes the winner of the general classification
†	Denotes the winner of the points classification
‡	Denotes the winner of the mountains classification
DNS	Denotes a rider who did not start a stage, followed by the stage before which he withdrew
DNF	Denotes a rider who did not finish a stage, followed by the stage in which he withdrew
HD	Denotes a rider who finished outside the time limit, followed by the stage in which he did so
Age correct as of 24 June 1962, the date on which the Tour began

=== By starting number ===
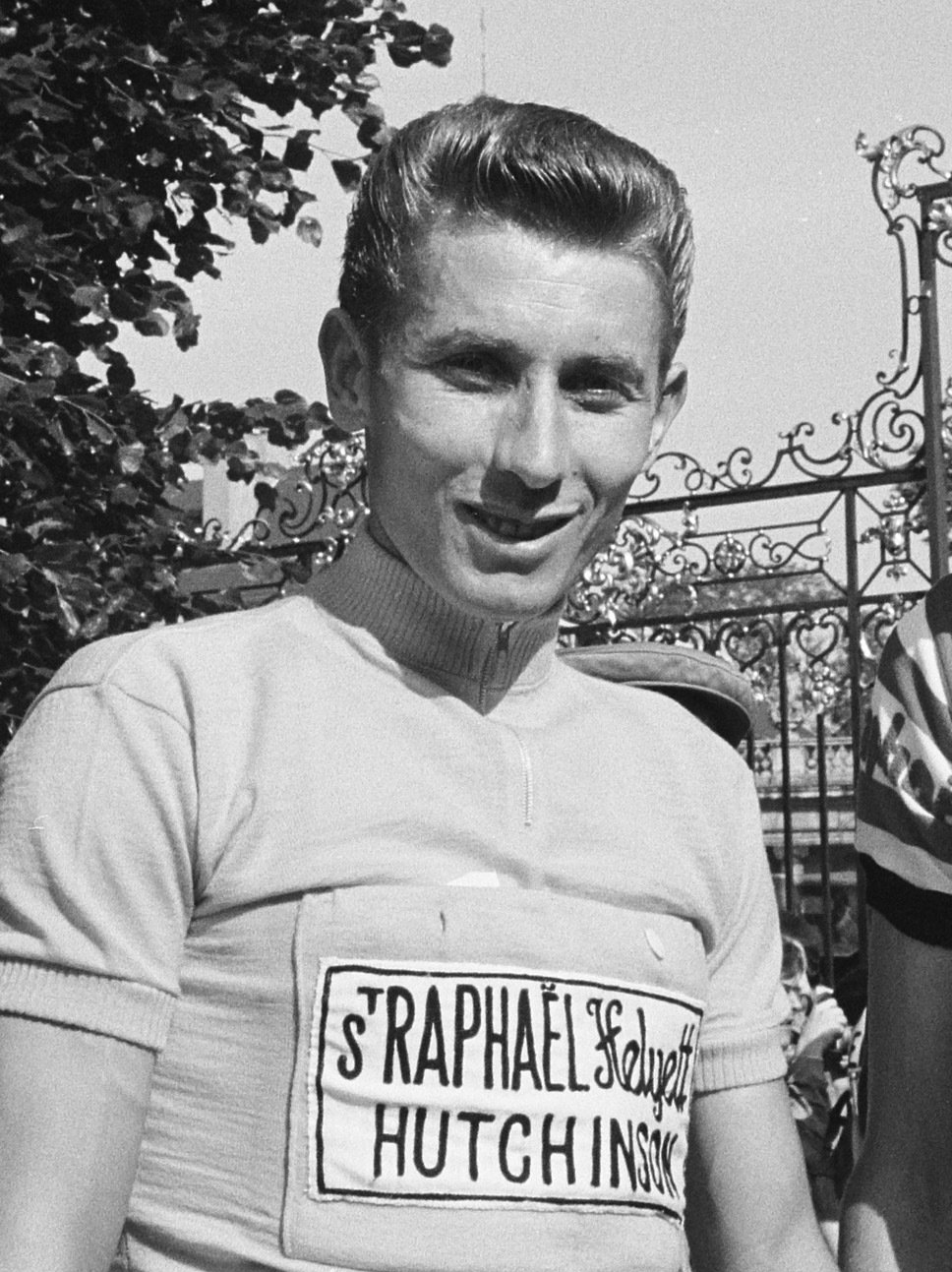
Saint-Raphaël–Helyett–Hutchinson rider Jacques Anquetil (pictured on stage one) won the general classification.

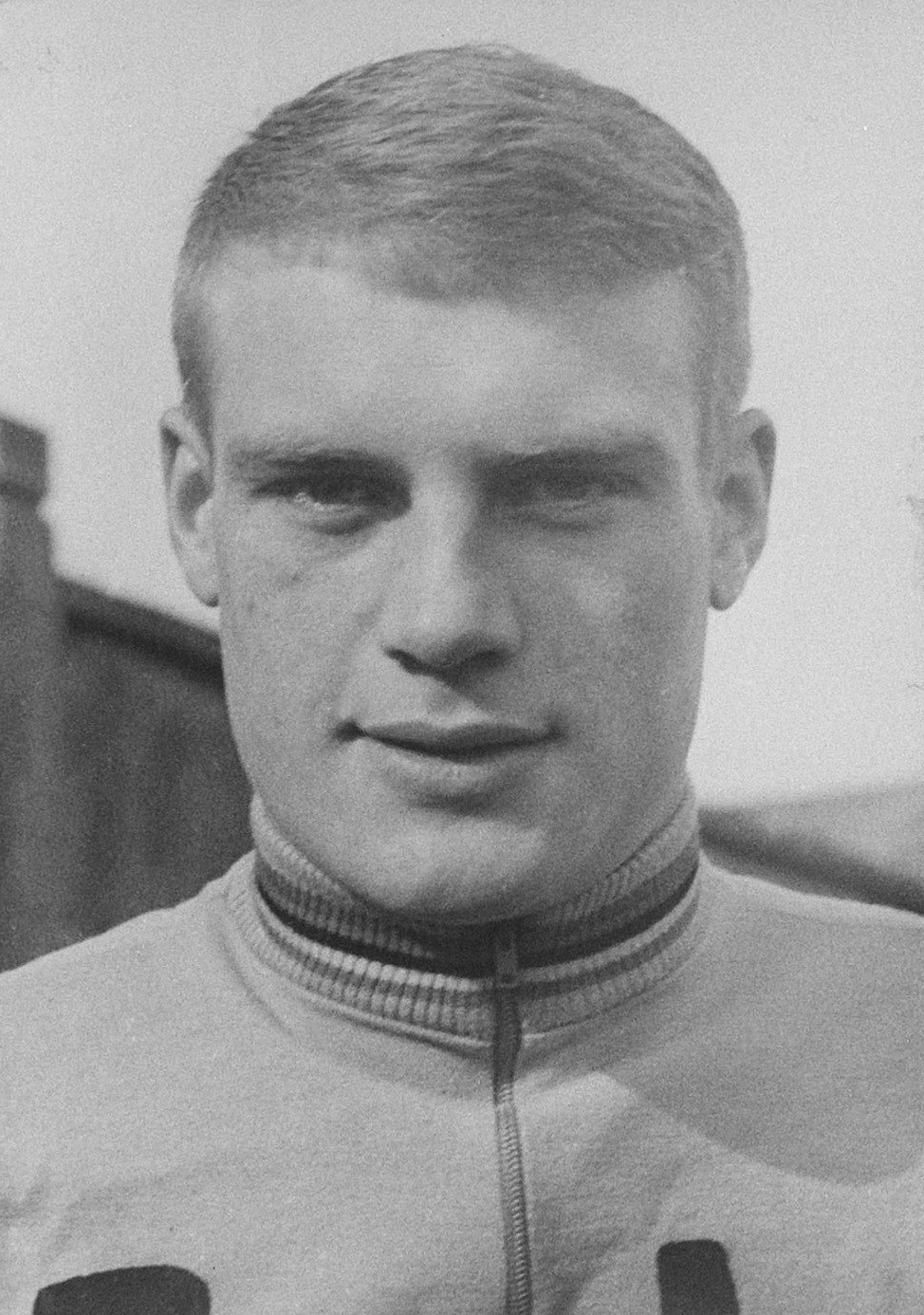
Saint-Raphaël–Helyett–Hutchinson rider Rudi Altig (pictured at the 1962 Tour) won the points classification.

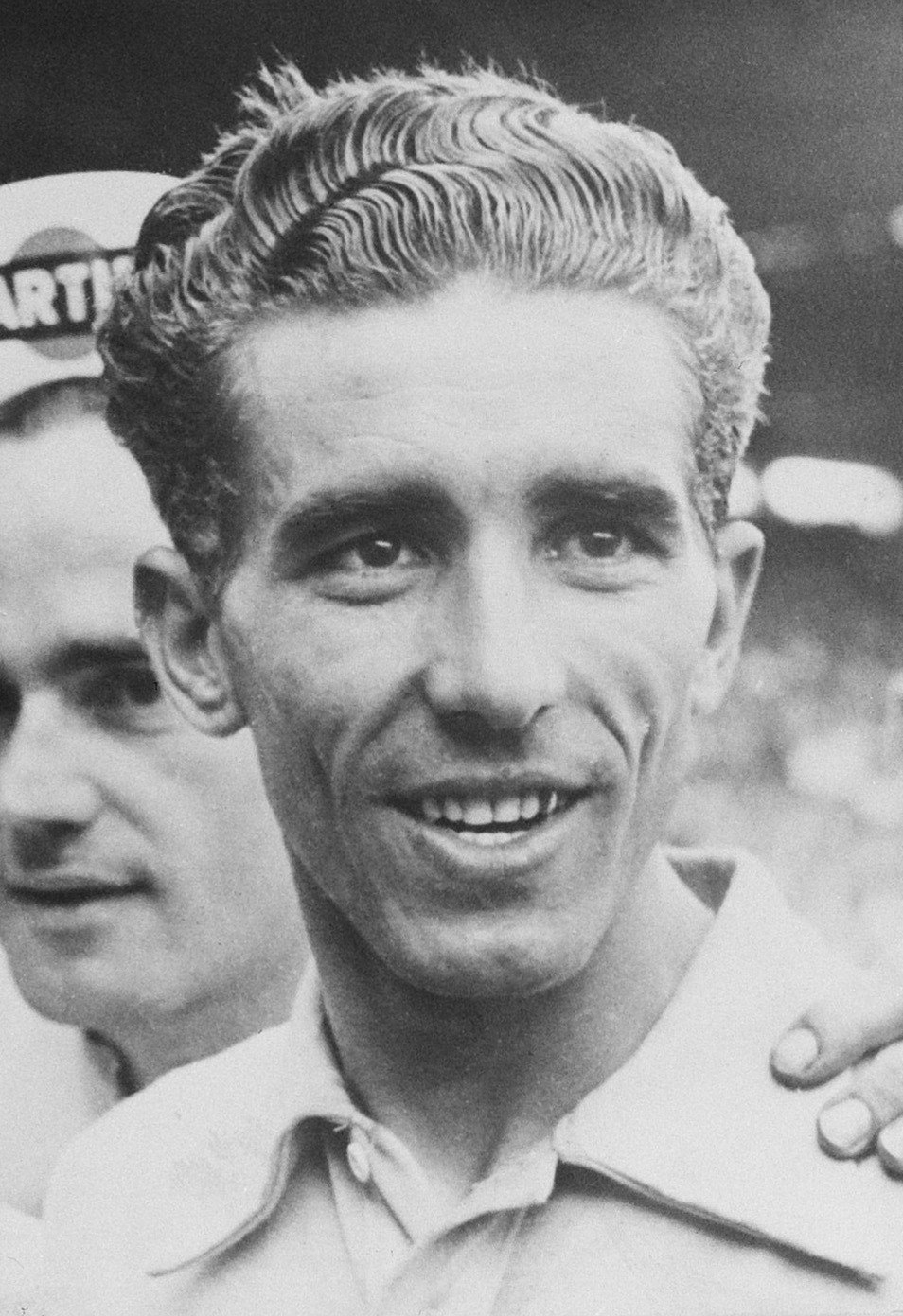
Margnat–Paloma–D'Alessandro rider Federico Bahamontes (pictured at the 1962 Tour) won the mountains classification.

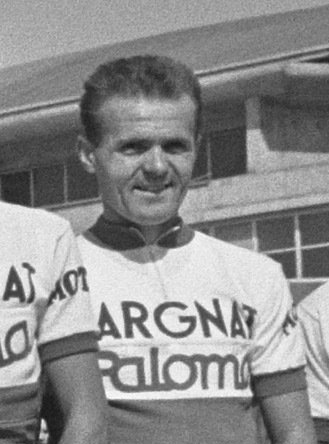
Wiel's–Groene Leeuw rider Eddy Pauwels (pictured at the 1964 Tour) won the super-combativity award.

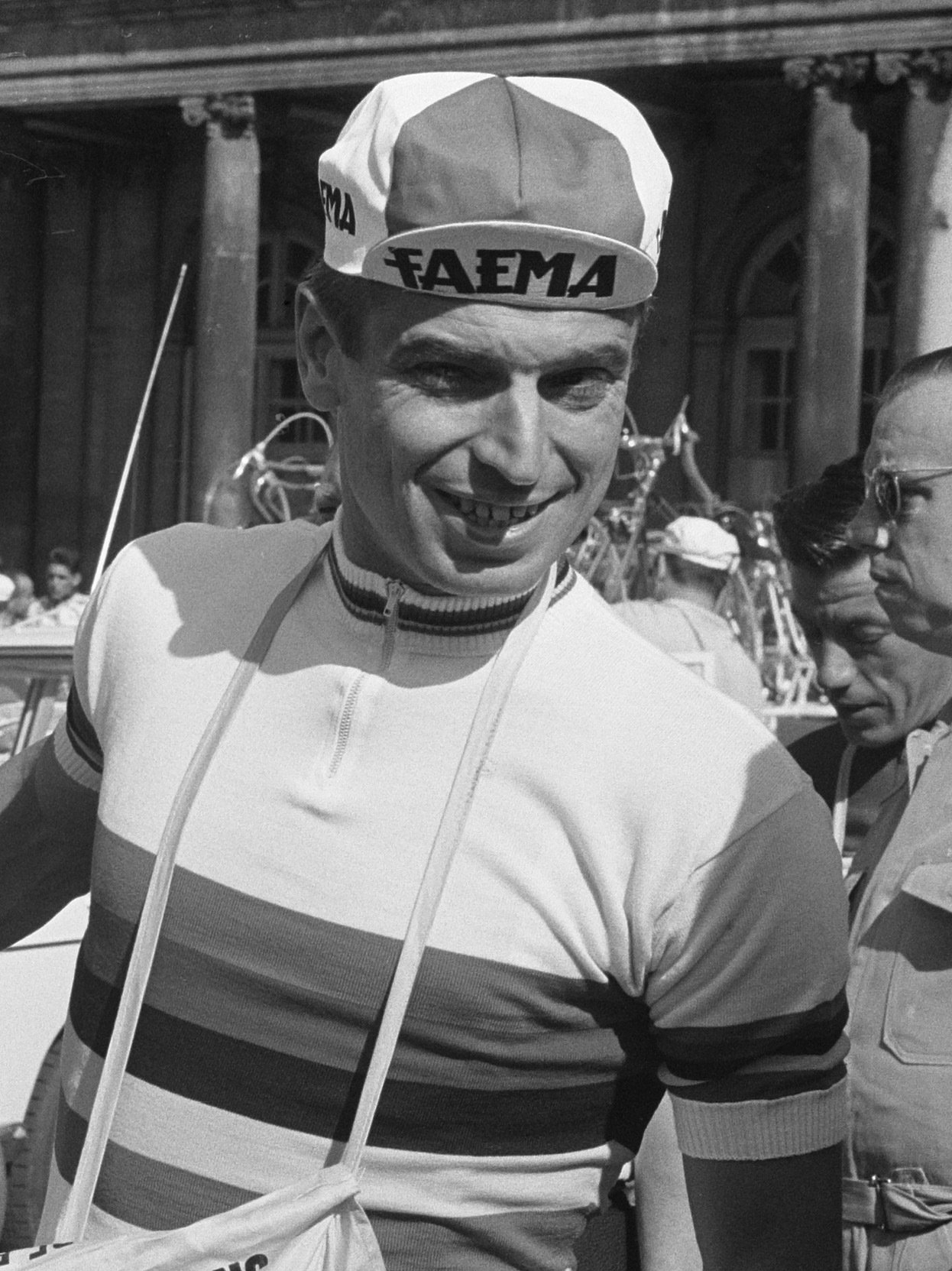
Flandria–Faema–Clément rider Rik Van Looy (pictured on stage one) won the super-bad luck award.

No.	Name	Nationality	Team	Age	Pos.	Time	Refs
1	Jacques Anquetil*	France	Saint-Raphaël–Helyett–Hutchinson	28	1	114h 31' 54"	
2	Rudi Altig†	West Germany	Saint-Raphaël–Helyett–Hutchinson	25	31	+ 1h 18' 14"	
3	Jean-Claude Annaert	France	Saint-Raphaël–Helyett–Hutchinson	26	68	+ 2h 30' 44"	
4	Pierre Everaert	France	Saint-Raphaël–Helyett–Hutchinson	28	56	+ 2h 04' 36"	
5	Albertus Geldermans	Netherlands	Saint-Raphaël–Helyett–Hutchinson	27	5	+ 14' 05"	
6	Jean Graczyk	France	Saint-Raphaël–Helyett–Hutchinson	29	38	+ 1h 38' 50"	
7	Jean Le Lan	France	Saint-Raphaël–Helyett–Hutchinson	24	92	+ 3h 45' 02"	
8	Louis Rostollan	France	Saint-Raphaël–Helyett–Hutchinson	26	24	+ 1h 03' 02"	
9	Jean Stablinski	France	Saint-Raphaël–Helyett–Hutchinson	30	30	+ 1h 14' 06"	
10	Michel Stolker	Netherlands	Saint-Raphaël–Helyett–Hutchinson	28	33	+ 1h 21' 19"	
11	Alberto Assirelli	Italy	Ignis–Moschettieri	25	DNS-14	—	
12	Ercole Baldini	Italy	Ignis–Moschettieri	29	8	+ 19' 00"	
13	Rino Benedetti	Italy	Ignis–Moschettieri	33	63	+ 2h 24' 28"	
14	Carlo Guarguaglini	Italy	Ignis–Moschettieri	29	93	+ 4h 08' 09"	
15	Augusto Marcaletti	Italy	Ignis–Moschettieri	27	94	+ 4h 29' 28"	
16	Italo Mazzacurati	Italy	Ignis–Moschettieri	30	82	+ 2h 58' 28"	
17	Gastone Nencini	Italy	Ignis–Moschettieri	32	DNS-14	—	
18	Arnaldo Pambianco	Italy	Ignis–Moschettieri	26	25	+ 1h 06' 10"	
19	Giuseppe Tonucci	Italy	Ignis–Moschettieri	24	88	+ 3h 42' 59"	
20	Giuseppe Zorzi	Italy	Ignis–Moschettieri	24	DNF-6	—	
21	Pierino Baffi	Italy	Ghigi	31	61	+ 2h 19' 16"	
22	Guido Boni	Italy	Ghigi	28	48	+ 1h 56' 00"	
23	Catullo Ciacci	Italy	Ghigi	28	DNF-9	—	
24	Franco Magnani	Italy	Ghigi	24	83	+ 3h 04' 53"	
25	Mario Minieri	Italy	Ghigi	24	75	+ 2h 39' 56"	
26	Diego Ronchini	Italy	Ghigi	26	DNF-17	—	
27	Luigi Sarti	Italy	Ghigi	27	86	+ 3h 31' 51"	
28	Angelino Soler	Spain	Ghigi	22	DNF-5	—	
29	Antonio Suárez	Spain	Ghigi	30	DNF-18	—	
30	Mario Zanchi	Italy	Ghigi	23	HD-7	—	
31	Henry Anglade	France	Liberia–Grammont–Wolber	28	12	+ 26' 33"	
32	Arthur Decabooter	Belgium	Liberia–Grammont–Wolber	25	DNF-14	—	
33	Joseph Carrara	France	Liberia–Grammont–Wolber	24	DNF-12	—	
34	Édouard Delberghe	France	Liberia–Grammont–Wolber	26	37	+ 1h 33' 23"	
35	Jean Dotto	France	Liberia–Grammont–Wolber	34	58	+ 2h 12' 32"	
36	André Foucher	France	Liberia–Grammont–Wolber	28	54	+ 2h 01' 43"	
37	Jaak De Boever	Belgium	Liberia–Grammont–Wolber	24	77	+ 2h 44' 06"	
38	Jean Milesi	France	Liberia–Grammont–Wolber	27	60	+ 2h 15' 52"	
39	Marc Huiart	France	Liberia–Grammont–Wolber	25	85	+ 3h 30' 26"	
40	Jean Selic	France	Liberia–Grammont–Wolber	27	89	+ 3h 43' 43"	
41	Dino Bruni	Italy	Gazzola–Fiorelli–Hutchinson	30	90	+ 3h 43' 52"	
42	Aurelio Cestari	Italy	Gazzola–Fiorelli–Hutchinson	28	41	+ 1h 41' 16"	
43	Marcel Ernzer	Luxembourg	Gazzola–Fiorelli–Hutchinson	36	DNF-12	—	
44	Charly Gaul	Luxembourg	Gazzola–Fiorelli–Hutchinson	29	9	+ 19' 11"	
45	Oreste Magni	Italy	Gazzola–Fiorelli–Hutchinson	26	WD-3	—	
46	Bruno Martinato	Italy	Gazzola–Fiorelli–Hutchinson	26	53	+ 2h 01' 07"	
47	Luigi Mele	Italy	Gazzola–Fiorelli–Hutchinson	24	DNF-1	—	
48	Alessandro Rimessi	Italy	Gazzola–Fiorelli–Hutchinson	24	DNF-14	—	
49	Attilio Moresi	Switzerland	Gazzola–Fiorelli–Hutchinson	28	DNF-1	—	
50	Alfredo Sabbadin	Italy	Gazzola–Fiorelli–Hutchinson	26	73	+ 2h 37' 16"	
51	Dick Enthoven	Netherlands	Pelforth–Sauvage–Lejeune	25	DNF-18	—	
52	Joseph Groussard	France	Pelforth–Sauvage–Lejeune	28	57	+ 2h 11' 26"	
53	Georges Groussard	France	Pelforth–Sauvage–Lejeune	25	72	+ 2h 34' 09"	
54	René Fournier	France	Pelforth–Sauvage–Lejeune	29	DNF-7	—	
55	Jean-Claude Lefebvre	France	Pelforth–Sauvage–Lejeune	29	HD-16	—	
56	François Mahé	France	Pelforth–Sauvage–Lejeune	31	20	+ 45' 36"	
57	Claude Mattio	France	Pelforth–Sauvage–Lejeune	26	DNF-19	—	
58	Francesco Miele	Italy	Pelforth–Sauvage–Lejeune	24	HD-7	—	
59	Alan Ramsbottom	Great Britain	Pelforth–Sauvage–Lejeune	26	45	+ 1h 50' 19"	
60	Michel Vermeulin	France	Pelforth–Sauvage–Lejeune	27	DNF-2a	—	
61	Carlo Azzini	Italy	Carpano	26	42	+ 1h 41' 22"	
62	Antonio Bailetti	Italy	Carpano	24	80	+ 2h 56' 35"	
63	Germano Barale	Italy	Carpano	26	46	+ 1h 52' 15"	
64	Hilaire Couvreur	Belgium	Carpano	37	74	+ 2h 38' 10"	
65	Nino Defilippis	Italy	Carpano	30	DNF-2a	—	
66	Gilbert Desmet	Belgium	Carpano	31	4	+ 13' 01"	
67	Arnaldo Di Maria	Italy	Carpano	26	DNS-8a	—	
68	Giancarlo Gentina	Italy	Carpano	23	DNF-18	—	
69	Giuseppe Sartore	Italy	Carpano	25	71	+ 2h 33' 33"	
70	Michel Van Aerde	Belgium	Carpano	28	DNF-14	—	
71	André Darrigade	France	Gitane–Leroux–Dunlop–R. Geminiani	33	21	+ 47' 50"	
72	Jean Forestier	France	Gitane–Leroux–Dunlop–R. Geminiani	31	36	+ 1h 31' 51"	
73	Guy Ignolin	France	Gitane–Leroux–Dunlop–R. Geminiani	25	78	+ 2h 45' 35"	
74	Jean-Claude Lebaube	France	Gitane–Leroux–Dunlop–R. Geminiani	24	11	+ 23' 36"	
75	Bas Maliepaard	Netherlands	Gitane–Leroux–Dunlop–R. Geminiani	24	47	+ 1h 55' 54"	
76	Raymond Mastrotto	France	Gitane–Leroux–Dunlop–R. Geminiani	27	29	+ 1h 12' 24"	
77	Anatole Novak	France	Gitane–Leroux–Dunlop–R. Geminiani	25	76	+ 2h 41' 13"	
78	Tom Simpson	Great Britain	Gitane–Leroux–Dunlop–R. Geminiani	24	6	+ 17' 09"	
79	Gérard Thiélin	France	Gitane–Leroux–Dunlop–R. Geminiani	27	HD-14	—	
80	Rolf Wolfshohl	West Germany	Gitane–Leroux–Dunlop–R. Geminiani	23	15	+ 35' 23"	
81	Jean-Baptiste Claes	Belgium	Wiel's–Groene Leeuw	25	52	+ 2h 00' 41"	
82	Frans De Mulder	Belgium	Wiel's–Groene Leeuw	24	DNF-14	—	
83	Gilbert De Smet	Belgium	Wiel's–Groene Leeuw	26	DNF-14	—	
84	Daniel Doom	Belgium	Wiel's–Groene Leeuw	27	40	+ 1h 40' 13"	
85	Robert De Middeleir	Belgium	Wiel's–Groene Leeuw	23	HD-14	—	
86	Hans Junkermann	West Germany	Wiel's–Groene Leeuw	28	DNF-14	—	
87	André Messelis	Belgium	Wiel's–Groene Leeuw	29	39	+ 1h 39' 08"	
88	Eddy Pauwels	Belgium	Wiel's–Groene Leeuw	27	10	+ 23' 04"	
89	Dieter Puschel	West Germany	Wiel's–Groene Leeuw	23	28	+ 1h 11' 12"	
90	Willy Vannitsen	Belgium	Wiel's–Groene Leeuw	27	70	+ 2h 33' 13"	
91	Federico Bahamontes‡	Spain	Margnat–Paloma–D'Alessandro	33	14	+ 34' 16"	
92	François Goasduff	France	Margnat–Paloma–D'Alessandro	27	DNF-4	—	
93	Albert Bouvet	France	Margnat–Paloma–D'Alessandro	32	DNF-12	—	
94	Juan Campillo	Spain	Margnat–Paloma–D'Alessandro	31	27	+ 1h 10' 34"	
95	Robert Ducard	France	Margnat–Paloma–D'Alessandro	30	HD-14	—	
96	Raymond Elena	France	Margnat–Paloma–D'Alessandro	30	HD-14	—	
97	Joseph Novales	France	Margnat–Paloma–D'Alessandro	24	DNF-6	—	
98	Luis Otaño	Spain	Margnat–Paloma–D'Alessandro	28	23	+ 53' 02"	
99	Joseph Thomin	France	Margnat–Paloma–D'Alessandro	30	DNF-15	—	
100	Joseph Velly	France	Margnat–Paloma–D'Alessandro	24	DNF-11	—	
101	Jaime Alomar	Spain	Peugeot–BP–Dunlop	24	DNF-19	—	
102	Manuel Busto	France	Peugeot–BP–Dunlop	29	67	+ 2h 27' 06"	
103	Pino Cerami	Belgium	Peugeot–BP–Dunlop	40	81	+ 2h 57' 32"	
104	Henri Duez	France	Peugeot–BP–Dunlop	24	DNF-5	—	
105	Stéphane Lach	France	Peugeot–BP–Dunlop	28	65	+ 2h 24' 57"	
106	Fernand Picot	France	Peugeot–BP–Dunlop	32	55	+ 2h 03' 24"	
107	Marcel Rohrbach	France	Peugeot–BP–Dunlop	29	HD-12	—	
108	Pierre Ruby	France	Peugeot–BP–Dunlop	29	HD-12	—	
109	Bernard Viot	France	Peugeot–BP–Dunlop	24	79	+ 2h 47' 17"	
110	Frans Schoubben	Belgium	Peugeot–BP–Dunlop	28	DNF-6	—	
111	Graziano Battistini	Italy	Legnano–Pirelli	26	DNS-1	—	
112	Giovanni Bettinelli	Italy	Legnano–Pirelli	27	87	+ 3h 40' 08"	
113	Sandro Cervellini	Italy	Legnano–Pirelli	21	DNF-12	—	
114	Emilio Ciolli	Italy	Legnano–Pirelli	29	91	+ 3h 44' 41"	
115	Giuseppe Dante	Italy	Legnano–Pirelli	31	66	+ 2h 25' 11"	
116	Renzo Fontona	Italy	Legnano–Pirelli	22	35	+ 1h 29' 33"	
117	Tiziano Galvanin	Italy	Legnano–Pirelli	21	DNF-12	—	
118	Giancarlo Manzoni	Italy	Legnano–Pirelli	23	49	+ 1h 59' 13"	
119	Imerio Massignan	Italy	Legnano–Pirelli	25	7	+ 17' 50"	
120	Fedele Rubagotti	Italy	Legnano–Pirelli	22	DNF-9	—	
121	Vittorio Adorni	Italy	Philco	24	HD-7	—	
122	Carlo Brugnami	Italy	Philco	23	59	+ 2h 13' 46"	
123	Guido Carlesi	Italy	Philco	25	19	+ 43' 29"	
124	Vittorio Chiarini	Italy	Philco	25	DNF-7	—	
125	Ottavio Cogliati	Italy	Philco	23	DNF-7	—	
126	Emile Daems	Belgium	Philco	24	13	+ 27' 17"	
127	Roberto Falaschi	Italy	Philco	31	84	+ 3h 04' 59"	
128	Jos Hoevenaers	Belgium	Philco	29	18	+ 42' 25"	
129	Nello Velucchi	Italy	Philco	26	HD-7	—	
130	Giorgio Zancanaro	Italy	Philco	22	64	+ 2h 24' 43"	
131	Roger Baens	Belgium	Flandria–Faema–Clément	28	43	+ 1h 43' 18"	
132	Armand Desmet	Belgium	Flandria–Faema–Clément	31	16	+ 39' 10"	
133	Marcel Ongenae	Belgium	Flandria–Faema–Clément	27	51	+ 2h 00' 06"	
134	Jef Planckaert	Belgium	Flandria–Faema–Clément	28	2	+ 4' 59"	
135	Willy Schroeders	Belgium	Flandria–Faema–Clément	29	DNF-14	—	
136	Edgard Sorgeloos	Belgium	Flandria–Faema–Clément	31	62	+ 2h 20' 58"	
137	Rik Van Looy	Belgium	Flandria–Faema–Clément	28	DNF-11	—	
138	Guillaume Van Tongerloo	Belgium	Flandria–Faema–Clément	28	44	+ 1h 47' 19"	
139	Piet van Est	Netherlands	Flandria–Faema–Clément	27	26	+ 1h 07' 14"	
140	Huub Zilverberg	Netherlands	Flandria–Faema–Clément	23	HD-12	—	
141	René Abadie	France	Mercier–BP–Hutchinson	26	HD-7	—	
142	Pierre Beuffeuil	France	Mercier–BP–Hutchinson	27	50	+ 1h 59' 53"	
143	Édouard Bihouée	France	Mercier–BP–Hutchinson	26	69	+ 2h 31' 01"	
144	Robert Cazala	France	Mercier–BP–Hutchinson	28	22	+ 54' 44"	
145	Hubert Ferrer	France	Mercier–BP–Hutchinson	25	HD-14	—	
146	Jean Gainche	France	Mercier–BP–Hutchinson	29	32	+ 1h 21' 18"	
147	Frans Melckenbeeck	Belgium	Mercier–BP–Hutchinson	21	HD-12	—	
148	Raymond Poulidor	France	Mercier–BP–Hutchinson	26	3	+ 10' 24"	
149	Willy Vanden Berghen	Belgium	Mercier–BP–Hutchinson	22	34	+ 1h 22' 51"	
150	Victor Van Schil	France	Mercier–BP–Hutchinson	30	17	+ 42' 01"	

=== By team ===
Saint-Raphaël–Helyett–Hutchinson
No.	Rider	Pos.
1	Jacques Anquetil (FRA)*	1
2	Rudi Altig (FRG)†	31
3	Jean-Claude Annaert (FRA)	68
4	Pierre Everaert (FRA)	56
5	Albertus Geldermans (NED)	5
6	Jean Graczyk (FRA)	38
7	Jean Le Lan (FRA)	85
8	Louis Rostollan (FRA)	24
9	Jean Stablinski (FRA)	30
10	Michel Stolker (NED)	33
Directeur sportif: Raphaël Géminiani

Ignis–Moschettieri
No.	Rider	Pos.
11	Alberto Assirelli (ITA)	DNS-14
12	Ercole Baldini (ITA)	8
13	Rino Benedetti (ITA)	63
14	Carlo Guarguaglini (ITA)	93
15	Augusto Marcaletti (ITA)	94
16	Italo Mazzacurati (ITA)	82
17	Gastone Nencini (ITA)	DNS-14
18	Arnaldo Pambianco (ITA)	25
19	Giuseppe Tonucci (ITA)	89
20	Giuseppe Zorzi (ITA)	DNF-6
Directeur sportif: Giovanni Proietti

Ghigi
No.	Rider	Pos.
21	Pierino Baffi (ITA)	61
22	Guido Boni (ITA)	48
23	Catullo Ciacci (ITA)	DNF-9
24	Franco Magnani (ITA)	83
25	Mario Minieri (ITA)	75
26	Diego Ronchini (ITA)	DNF-17
27	Luigi Sarti (ITA)	87
28	Angelino Soler (ESP)	DNF-5
29	Antonio Suárez (ESP)	DNF-18
30	Mario Zanchi (ITA)	HD-7
Directeur sportif: Luciano Pezzi

Liberia–Grammont–Wolber
No.	Rider	Pos.
31	Henry Anglade (FRA)	12
32	Arthur Decabooter (BEL)	DNF-14
33	Joseph Carrara (FRA)	DNF-12
34	Édouard Delberghe (FRA)	37
35	Jean Dotto (FRA)	58
36	André Foucher (FRA)	54
37	Jaak De Boever (BEL)	77
38	Jean Milesi (FRA)	60
39	Marc Huiart (FRA)	86
40	Jean Selic (FRA)	90
Directeur sportif: Bernard Gauthier

Gazzola–Fiorelli–Hutchinson
No.	Rider	Pos.
41	Dino Bruni (ITA)	91
42	Aurelio Cestari (ITA)	41
43	Marcel Ernzer (LUX)	DNF-12
44	Charly Gaul (LUX)	9
45	Oreste Magni (ITA)	DNF-3
46	Bruno Martinato (ITA)	53
47	Luigi Mele (ITA)	DNF-1
48	Alessandro Primessi (ITA)	DNF-14
49	Attilio Moresi (SUI)	DNF-1
50	Alfredo Sabbadin (ITA)	73
Directeur sportif: Pino Villa

Pelforth–Sauvage–Lejeune
No.	Rider	Pos.
51	Dick Enthoven (NED)	DNF-18
52	Joseph Groussard (FRA)	57
53	Georges Groussard (FRA)	72
54	René Fournier (FRA)	DNF-7
55	Jean-Claude Lefebvre (FRA)	HD-16
56	François Mahé (FRA)	20
57	Claude Mattio (FRA)	DNF-19
58	Francesco Miele (ITA)	HD-7
59	Alan Ramsbottom (GBR)	45
60	Michel Vermeulin (FRA)	DNF-2a
Directeur sportif: Maurice De Muer

Carpano
No.	Rider	Pos.
61	Carlo Azzini (ITA)	42
62	Antonio Bailetti (ITA)	80
63	Germano Barale (ITA)	46
64	Hilaire Couvreur (BEL)	74
65	Nino Defilippis (ITA)	DNF-2a
66	Gilbert Desmet (BEL)	4
67	Arnaldo Di Maria (ITA)	DNS-8a
68	Giancarlo Gentina (ITA)	DNF-18
69	Giuseppe Sartore (ITA)	71
70	Michel Van Aerde (BEL)	DNF-14
Directeur sportif: Désiré Keteleer/Ettore Milano

Gitane–Leroux–Dunlop–R. Geminiani
No.	Rider	Pos.
71	André Darrigade (FRA)	21
72	Jean Forestier (FRA)	36
73	Guy Ignolin (FRA)	78
74	Jean-Claude Lebaube (FRA)	11
75	Bas Maliepaard (NED)	47
76	Raymond Mastrotto (FRA)	29
77	Anatole Novak (FRA)	76
78	Tom Simpson (GBR)	6
79	Gérard Thiélin (FRA)	HD-14
80	Rolf Wolfshohl (FRG)	15
Directeur sportif: Raymond Louviot

Wiel's–Groene Leeuw
No.	Rider	Pos.
81	Jean-Baptiste Claes (BEL)	52
82	Frans De Mulder (BEL)	DNF-14
83	Gilbert De Smet (BEL)	DNF-14
84	Daniel Doom (BEL)	40
85	Robert De Middeleir (BEL)	HD-14
86	Hans Junkermann (FRG)	DNF-14
87	André Messelis (BEL)	39
88	Eddy Pauwels (BEL)	10
89	Dieter Puschel (FRG)	28
90	Willy Vannitsen (BEL)	70
Directeur sportif: Albert de Kimpe

Margnat–Paloma–D'Alessandro
No.	Rider	Pos.
91	Federico Bahamontes (ESP)‡	14
92	François Goasduff (FRA)	DNF-4
93	Albert Bouvet (FRA)	DNF-12
94	Juan Campillo (ESP)	27
95	Robert Ducard (FRA)	HD-14
96	Raymond Elena (FRA)	HD-14
97	Joseph Novales (FRA)	DNF-6
98	Luis Otaño (ESP)	23
99	Joseph Thomin (FRA)	DNF-15
100	Joseph Velly (FRA)	DNF-11
Directeur sportif: Raoul Rémy

Peugeot–BP–Dunlop
No.	Rider	Pos.
101	Jaime Alomar (ESP)	DNF-19
102	Manuel Busto (FRA)	67
103	Pino Cerami (BEL)	81
104	Henri Duez (FRA)	DNF-5
105	Stéphane Lach (FRA)	65
106	Fernand Picot (FRA)	55
107	Marcel Rohrbach (FRA)	HD-12
108	Pierre Ruby (FRA)	HD-12
109	Bernard Viot (FRA)	79
110	Frans Schoubben (BEL)	DNF-6
Directeur sportif: Gaston Plaud

Legnano–Pirelli
No.	Rider	Pos.
111	Graziano Battistini (ITA)	DNS-1
112	Giovanni Bettinelli (ITA)	88
113	Sandro Cervellini (ITA)	DNF-12
114	Emilio Ciolli (ITA)	92
115	Peppino Dante (ITA)	66
116	Renzo Fontona (ITA)	35
117	Tiziano Galvanin (ITA)	DNF-12
118	Giancarlo Manzoni (ITA)	48
119	Imerio Massignan (ITA)	7
120	Fedele Rubagotti (ITA)	DNF-9
Directeur sportif: Eberardo Pavesi

Philco
No.	Rider	Pos.
121	Vittorio Adorni (ITA)	HD-7
122	Carlo Brugnami (ITA)	59
123	Guido Carlesi (ITA)	19
124	Vittorio Chiarini (ITA)	DNF-7
125	Ottavio Cogliati (ITA)	DNF-7
126	Emile Daems (BEL)	13
127	Roberto Falaschi (ITA)	84
128	Jos Hoevenaers (BEL)	18
129	Nello Velucchi (ITA)	HD-7
130	Giorgio Zancanaro (ITA)	64
Directeur sportif: Luigi Sardi

Flandria–Faema–Clément
No.	Rider	Pos.
131	Roger Baens (BEL)	43
132	Armand Desmet (BEL)	16
133	Marcel Ongenae (BEL)	51
134	Jef Planckaert (BEL)	2
135	Willy Schroeders (BEL)	DNF-14
136	Edgard Sorgeloos (BEL)	62
137	Rik Van Looy (BEL)	DNF-11
138	Guillaume Van Tongerloo (BEL)	44
139	Piet van Est (NED)	26
140	Huub Zilverberg (NED)	HD-12
Directeur sportif: Guillaume Driessens

Mercier–BP–Hutchinson
No.	Rider	Pos.
141	René Abadie (FRA)	HD-7
142	Pierre Beuffeuil (FRA)	50
143	Édouard Bihouée (FRA)	69
144	Robert Cazala (FRA)	22
145	Hubert Ferrer (FRA)	HD-14
146	Jean Gainche (FRA)	32
147	Frans Melckenbeeck (BEL)	HD-12
148	Raymond Poulidor (FRA)	3
149	Willy Vanden Berghen (BEL)	34
150	Victor Van Schil (FRA)	17
Directeur sportif: Antonin Magne

=== By nationality ===
Country	No. of riders	Finishers	Stage wins
Belgium	28	18	7 (Willy Vanden Berghen, Emile Daems ×2, Willy Vannitsen ×3, Eddy Pauwels)
France	50	32	7 (André Darrigade, Robert Cazala ×2, Jean Stablinski, Raymond Poulidor, Jacques Anquetil ×2)
West Germany	3	3	3 (Rudi Altig ×3)
Great Britain	2	2	
Italy	52	31	4 (Mario Minieri, Antonio Bailetti, Dino Bruni, Rino Benedetti)
Luxembourg	2	1	
Netherlands	6	4	1 (Huub Zilverberg)
Spain	6	3	1 (Federico Bahamontes)
Switzerland	1	0	
Total	150	94	23 (Note: The team time trial on stage 2b, won by Flandria–Faema–Clément, is not counted in this total.)

== Bibliography ==
- Augendre, Jacques (2016). Guide historique [Historical guide] (PDF) (in French). Paris: Amaury Sport Organisation. Archived (PDF) from the original on 17 August 2016.
- Clifford, Peter (1965). The Tour de France. London: Stanley Paul.
- Dauncey, Hugh; Hare, Geoff (2003). The Tour de France, 1903–2003: A Century of Sporting Structures, Meanings and Values. London: Frank Cass & Co. ISBN 978-0-203-50241-9.
- Dauncey, Hugh (2012). French Cycling: A Social and Cultural History. Contemporary French and Francophone Cultures. Vol. 23. Liverpool University Press. ISBN 978-1-84631-835-1.
- Hanold, Maylon (2012). World Sports: A Reference Handbook. Santa Barbara, CA: ABC-CLIO. ISBN 978-1-59884-779-6.
- McGann, Bill; McGann, Carol (2006). The Story of the Tour de France: 1903–1964. Vol. 1. Indianapolis, IN: Dog Ear Publishing. ISBN 978-1-59858-180-5.
- Nelsson, Richard (2012). The Tour de France ... to the Bitter End. London: Guardian Books. ISBN 978-0-85265-336-4.
- Reed, Eric (2015). Selling the Yellow Jersey: The Tour de France in the Global Era. Oakland, CA: University of Chicago Press. ISBN 978-0-226-20667-7.
- Wilcockson, John (2007). The 2007 Tour de France. Boulder, CO: VeloPress. ISBN 978-1-934030-10-3.
