= 1962 Tour de France, Stage 1 to Stage 10 =

Cycling race stages

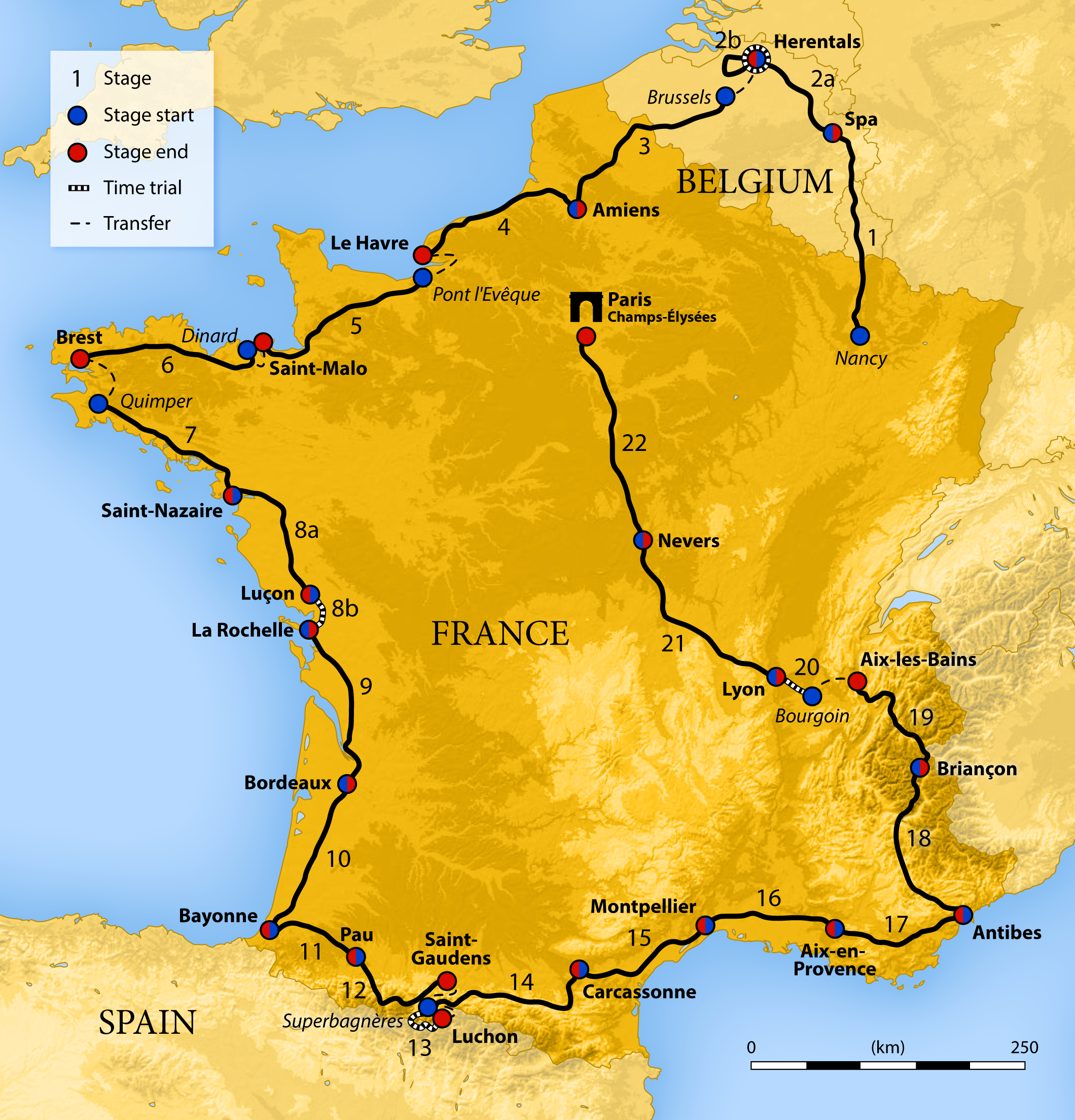
Route of the 1962 Tour de France; followed counterclockwise, starting in Nancy and finishing in Paris

The 1962 Tour de France was the 49th edition of the Tour de France, one of cycling's Grand Tours. It took place between from 24 June and 15 July, with 22 stages covering a distance of 4,274 km (2,656 mi). After more than 30 years, the Tour was again contested by trade teams. Frenchman Jacques Anquetil defended his title, winning his third Tour de France.

== Classification standings ==
Legend (Note: Jerseys appearing in the table on the left of the page indicate those worn by the cyclist during the particular stage, while those appearing in the table on the right of the page indicate those awarded to the cyclist after the stage.)
A yellow jersey	Denotes the leader of the general classification	A green jersey	Denotes the leader of the points classification

== Stage 1 ==
24 June 1962 — Nancy to Spa (Belgium), 253 km (157 mi)

Stage 1 result
Rank	Rider	Team	Time
1	Rudi Altig (FRG)	Saint-Raphaël–Helyett–Hutchinson	6h 36' 33"
2	André Darrigade (FRA)	Gitane–Leroux–Dunlop–R. Geminiani	+ 0"
3	Rik Van Looy (BEL)	Flandria–Faema–Clément	+ 0"
4	Jos Hoevenaers (BEL)	Philco	+ 0"
5	Guido Carlesi (ITA)	Philco	+ 0"
6	Gilbert Desmet (BEL)	Carpano	+ 0"
7	Piet van Est (NED)	Flandria–Faema–Clément	+ 0"
8	Luis Otaño (ESP)	Philco	+ 0"
9	Tom Simpson (GBR)	Gitane–Leroux–Dunlop–R. Geminiani	+ 0"
10	Hans Junkermann (BEL)	Wiel's–Groene Leeuw	+ 0"

General classification after stage 1
Rank	Rider	Team	Time
1	Rudi Altig (FRG)	Saint-Raphaël–Helyett–Hutchinson	6h 35' 33"
2	André Darrigade (FRA)	Gitane–Leroux–Dunlop–R. Geminiani	+ 30"
3	Rik Van Looy (BEL)	Flandria–Faema–Clément	+ 1' 00"
4	Jos Hoevenaers (BEL)	Philco	+ 1' 00"
5	Guido Carlesi (ITA)	Philco	+ 1' 00"
6	Gilbert Desmet (BEL)	Carpano	+ 1' 00"
7	Piet van Est (NED)	Flandria–Faema–Clément	+ 1' 00"
8	Luis Otaño (ESP)	Philco	+ 1' 00"
9	Tom Simpson (GBR)	Gitane–Leroux–Dunlop–R. Geminiani	+ 1' 00"
10	Hans Junkermann (FRG)	Wiel's–Groene Leeuw	+ 1' 00"

== Stage 2a ==
25 June 1962 — Spa (Belgium) to Herentals (Belgium), 147 km (91 mi)

Stage 2a result
Rank	Rider	Team	Time
1	André Darrigade (FRA)	Gitane–Leroux–Dunlop–R. Geminiani	3h 40' 48"
2	Frans Melckenbeeck (FRA)	Mercier–BP–Hutchinson	+ 0"
3	Willy Vannitsen (BEL)	Wiel's–Groene Leeuw	+ 0"
4	Rik Van Looy (BEL)	Flandria–Faema–Clément	+ 0"
5	Joseph Groussard (FRA)	Pelforth–Sauvage–Lejeune	+ 0"
6	Bas Maliepaard (NED)	Gitane–Leroux–Dunlop–R. Geminiani	+ 0"
7	Giuseppe Zorzi (ITA)	Ignis–Moschettieri	+ 0"
8	Piet van Est (NED)	Flandria–Faema–Clément	+ 0"
9	Frans De Mulder (BEL)	Wiel's–Groene Leeuw	+ 0"
10	Frans Schoubben (BEL)	Peugeot–BP–Dunlop	+ 0"

General classification after stage 2a
Rank	Rider	Team	Time
1	André Darrigade (FRA)	Gitane–Leroux–Dunlop–R. Geminiani	10h 15' 51"
2	Rudi Altig (FRG)	Saint-Raphaël–Helyett–Hutchinson	+ 30"
3	Jacques Anquetil (FRA)	Saint-Raphaël–Helyett–Hutchinson	+ 1' 30"
4	Albertus Geldermans (NED)	Saint-Raphaël–Helyett–Hutchinson	+ 1' 30"
5	Michel Stolker (NED)	Saint-Raphaël–Helyett–Hutchinson	+ 1' 30"
6	Ercole Baldini (ITA)	Ignis–Moschettieri	+ 1' 30"
7	Gastone Nencini (ITA)	Ignis–Moschettieri	+ 1' 30"
8	Diego Ronchini (ITA)	Ghigi	+ 1' 30"
9	Antonio Suárez (ESP)	Ghigi	+ 1' 30"
10	Henry Anglade (FRA)	Liberia–Grammont–Wolber	+ 1' 30"

== Stage 2b ==
25 June 1962 — Herentals (Belgium), 23 km (14 mi) (TTT)

Stage 2b result
Rank	Team	Time
1	Flandria–Faema–Clément	1h 27' 03"
2	Gitane–Leroux–Dunlop–R. Geminiani	+ 1' 15"
3	Saint-Raphaël–Helyett–Hutchinson	+ 1' 33"
4	Wiel's–Groene Leeuw	+ 1' 42"
5	Ghigi	+ 2' 06"
6	Philco	+ 2' 42"
7	Ignis–Moschettieri	+ 3' 03"
8	Margnat–Paloma–D'Alessandro	+ 3' 36"
9	Carpano	+ 4' 39"
10	Pelforth–Sauvage–Lejeune	+ 4' 57"

General classification after stage 2b
Rank	Rider	Team	Time
1	André Darrigade (FRA)	Gitane–Leroux–Dunlop–R. Geminiani	10h 45' 17"
2	Rudi Altig (FRG)	Saint-Raphaël–Helyett–Hutchinson	+ 36"
3	Rik Van Looy (BEL)	Flandria–Faema–Clément	+ 1' 05"
4	Piet van Est (NED)	Flandria–Faema–Clément	+ 1' 05"
5	Jef Planckaert (BEL)	Flandria–Faema–Clément	+ 1' 05"
6	Armand Desmet (BEL)	Flandria–Faema–Clément	+ 1' 50"
7	Tom Simpson (GBR)	Gitane–Leroux–Dunlop–R. Geminiani	+ 1' 30"
8	Jacques Anquetil (FRA)	Saint-Raphaël–Helyett–Hutchinson	+ 1' 36"
9	Michel Stolker (NED)	Saint-Raphaël–Helyett–Hutchinson	+ 1' 36"
10	Albertus Geldermans (NED)	Saint-Raphaël–Helyett–Hutchinson	+ 1' 36"

== Stage 3 ==
26 June 1962 — Brussels to Amiens, 210 km (130 mi)

Stage 3 result
Rank	Rider	Team	Time
1	Rudi Altig (FRG)	Saint-Raphaël–Helyett–Hutchinson	5h 32' 20"
2	Joseph Groussard (FRA)	Pelforth–Sauvage–Lejeune	+ 0"
3	Willy Vannitsen (BEL)	Wiel's–Groene Leeuw	+ 0"
4	Emile Daems (BEL)	Philco	+ 0"
5	André Darrigade (FRA)	Gitane–Leroux–Dunlop–R. Geminiani	+ 0"
6	Jean Graczyk (FRA)	Saint-Raphaël–Helyett–Hutchinson	+ 0"
7	Michel Van Aerde (BEL)	Carpano	+ 0"
8	Jean Gainche (FRA)	Mercier–BP–Hutchinson	+ 0"
9	Guido Carlesi (ITA)	Philco	+ 0"
10	Rik Van Looy (BEL)	Flandria–Faema–Clément	+ 0"

General classification after stage 3
Rank	Rider	Team	Time
1	Rudi Altig (FRG)	Saint-Raphaël–Helyett–Hutchinson	16h 17' 13"
2	André Darrigade (FRA)	Gitane–Leroux–Dunlop–R. Geminiani	+ 24"
3	Rik Van Looy (BEL)	Flandria–Faema–Clément	+ 1' 29"
4	Jef Planckaert (BEL)	Flandria–Faema–Clément	+ 1' 29"
5	Tom Simpson (GBR)	Gitane–Leroux–Dunlop–R. Geminiani	+ 1' 54"
6	Albertus Geldermans (NED)	Saint-Raphaël–Helyett–Hutchinson	+ 2' 00"
7	Jacques Anquetil (FRA)	Saint-Raphaël–Helyett–Hutchinson	+ 2' 00"
8	Michel Stolker (NED)	Saint-Raphaël–Helyett–Hutchinson	+ 2' 00"
9	Hans Junkermann (FRG)	Wiel's–Groene Leeuw	+ 2' 03"
10	Antonio Suárez (ESP)	Ghigi	+ 2' 11"

== Stage 4 ==
27 June 1962 — Amiens to Le Havre, 196.5 km (122.1 mi)

Stage 4 result
Rank	Rider	Team	Time
1	Willy Vanden Berghen (BEL)	Mercier–BP–Hutchinson	4h 51' 17"
2	Dino Bruni (ITA)	Gazzola–Fiorelli–Hutchinson	+ 0"
3	Rolf Wolfshohl (FRG)	Gitane–Leroux–Dunlop–R. Geminiani	+ 0"
4	Giancarlo Manzoni (ITA)	Legnano–Pirelli	+ 0"
5	Jean-Claude Lebaube (FRA)	Gitane–Leroux–Dunlop–R. Geminiani	+ 0"
6	Rudi Altig (FRG)	Saint-Raphaël–Helyett–Hutchinson	+ 2' 15"
7	Frans Melckenbeeck (FRA)	Mercier–BP–Hutchinson	+ 2' 15"
8	Tiziano Galvanin (ITA)	Legnano–Pirelli	+ 2' 15"
9	Arthur Decabooter (BEL)	Liberia–Grammont–Wolber	+ 2' 15"
10	Jean Graczyk (FRA)	Saint-Raphaël–Helyett–Hutchinson	+ 2' 15"

General classification after stage 4
Rank	Rider	Team	Time
1	Rudi Altig (FRG)	Saint-Raphaël–Helyett–Hutchinson	21h 10' 45"
2	André Darrigade (FRA)	Gitane–Leroux–Dunlop–R. Geminiani	+ 35"
3	Rik Van Looy (BEL)	Flandria–Faema–Clément	+ 1' 29"
4	Jef Planckaert (BEL)	Flandria–Faema–Clément	+ 1' 29"
5	Tom Simpson (GBR)	Gitane–Leroux–Dunlop–R. Geminiani	+ 1' 54"
6	Albertus Geldermans (NED)	Saint-Raphaël–Helyett–Hutchinson	+ 2' 00"
7	Jacques Anquetil (FRA)	Saint-Raphaël–Helyett–Hutchinson	+ 2' 00"
8	Michel Stolker (NED)	Saint-Raphaël–Helyett–Hutchinson	+ 2' 00"
9	Hans Junkermann (FRG)	Wiel's–Groene Leeuw	+ 2' 03"
10	Antonio Suárez (ESP)	Ghigi	+ 2' 11"

== Stage 5 ==
28 June 1962 — Pont l'Evêque to Saint-Malo, 215 km (134 mi)

Stage 5 result
Rank	Rider	Team	Time
1	Emile Daems (BEL)	Philco	5h 21' 48"
2	Jean Graczyk (FRA)	Saint-Raphaël–Helyett–Hutchinson	+ 2"
3	Giancarlo Manzoni (ITA)	Ignis–Moschettieri	+ 2"
4	Arthur Decabooter (BEL)	Liberia–Grammont–Wolber	+ 2"
5	Michel Van Aerde (BEL)	Carpano	+ 2"
6	Rik Van Looy (BEL)	Flandria–Faema–Clément	+ 2"
7	Jean Gainche (FRA)	Mercier–BP–Hutchinson	+ 2"
8	Bas Maliepaard (NED)	Gitane–Leroux–Dunlop–R. Geminiani	+ 2"
9	Joseph Velly (FRA)	Margnat–Paloma–D'Alessandro	+ 2"
10	Rudi Altig (FRG)	Saint-Raphaël–Helyett–Hutchinson	+ 2"

General classification after stage 5
Rank	Rider	Team	Time
1	Rudi Altig (FRG)	Saint-Raphaël–Helyett–Hutchinson	26h 32' 00"
2	André Darrigade (FRA)	Gitane–Leroux–Dunlop–R. Geminiani	+ 35"
3	Emile Daems (BEL)	Philco	+ 1' 21"
4	Rik Van Looy (BEL)	Flandria–Faema–Clément	+ 1' 29"
5	Jef Planckaert (BEL)	Flandria–Faema–Clément	+ 1' 29"
6	Tom Simpson (GBR)	Gitane–Leroux–Dunlop–R. Geminiani	+ 1' 54"
7	Albertus Geldermans (NED)	Saint-Raphaël–Helyett–Hutchinson	+ 2' 00"
8	Jacques Anquetil (FRA)	Saint-Raphaël–Helyett–Hutchinson	+ 2' 00"
9	Michel Stolker (NED)	Saint-Raphaël–Helyett–Hutchinson	+ 2' 00"
10	Hans Junkermann (FRG)	Wiel's–Groene Leeuw	+ 2' 03"

== Stage 6 ==
29 June 1962 — Dinard to Brest, 235.5 km (146.3 mi)

Stage 6 result
Rank	Rider	Team	Time
1	Robert Cazala (FRA)	Mercier–BP–Hutchinson	5h 41' 21"
2	Willy Vanden Berghen (BEL)	Mercier–BP–Hutchinson	+ 0"
3	Daniel Doom (BEL)	Wiel's–Groene Leeuw	+ 0"
4	Rolf Wolfshohl (FRG)	Gitane–Leroux–Dunlop–R. Geminiani	+ 0"
5	Albertus Geldermans (NED)	Saint-Raphaël–Helyett–Hutchinson	+ 0"
6	Guy Ignolin (FRA)	Gitane–Leroux–Dunlop–R. Geminiani	+ 0"
7	Francesco Miele (ITA)	Pelforth–Sauvage–Lejeune	+ 0"
8	Willy Schroeders (BEL)	Flandria–Faema–Clément	+ 0"
9	Édouard Bihouée (FRA)	Mercier–BP–Hutchinson	+ 0"
10	Jos Hoevenaers (BEL)	Philco	+ 0"

General classification after stage 6
Rank	Rider	Team	Time
1	Albertus Geldermans (NED)	Saint-Raphaël–Helyett–Hutchinson	32h 15' 56"
2	Jos Hoevenaers (BEL)	Philco	+ 23"
3	Rudi Altig (FRG)	Saint-Raphaël–Helyett–Hutchinson	+ 3' 14"
4	André Darrigade (FRA)	Gitane–Leroux–Dunlop–R. Geminiani	+ 3' 49"
5	Emile Daems (BEL)	Philco	+ 4' 35"
6	Rik Van Looy (BEL)	Flandria–Faema–Clément	+ 4' 43"
7	Jef Planckaert (BEL)	Flandria–Faema–Clément	+ 4' 43"
8	Tom Simpson (GBR)	Gitane–Leroux–Dunlop–R. Geminiani	+ 5' 08"
9	Jacques Anquetil (FRA)	Saint-Raphaël–Helyett–Hutchinson	+ 5' 14"
10	Michel Stolker (NED)	Saint-Raphaël–Helyett–Hutchinson	+ 5' 14"

== Stage 7 ==
30 June 1962 — Quimper to Saint-Nazaire, 201 km (125 mi)

Stage 7 result
Rank	Rider	Team	Time
1	Huub Zilverberg (NED)	Flandria–Faema–Clément	4h 30' 55"
2	Bas Maliepaard (NED)	Gitane–Leroux–Dunlop–R. Geminiani	+ 0"
3	Pierino Baffi (ITA)	Ghigi	+ 5"
4	Jean-Baptiste Claes (BEL)	Wiel's–Groene Leeuw	+ 5"
5	Piet van Est (NED)	Flandria–Faema–Clément	+ 5"
6	Jef Planckaert (BEL)	Flandria–Faema–Clément	+ 5"
7	Joseph Thomin (FRA)	Margnat–Paloma–D'Alessandro	+ 5"
8	Fedele Rubagotti (ITA)	Legnano–Pirelli	+ 5"
9	Imerio Massignan (ITA)	Legnano–Pirelli	+ 5"
10	Italo Mazzacurati (ITA)	Ignis–Moschettieri	+ 5"

General classification after stage 7
Rank	Rider	Team	Time
1	Albertus Geldermans (NED)	Saint-Raphaël–Helyett–Hutchinson	36h 48' 37"
2	Jos Hoevenaers (BEL)	Philco	+ 23"
3	André Darrigade (FRA)	Gitane–Leroux–Dunlop–R. Geminiani	+ 2' 22"
4	Jef Planckaert (BEL)	Flandria–Faema–Clément	+ 3' 02"
5	Rudi Altig (FRG)	Saint-Raphaël–Helyett–Hutchinson	+ 3' 07"
6	Hans Junkermann (FRG)	Wiel's–Groene Leeuw	+ 3' 50"
7	Piet van Est (NED)	Flandria–Faema–Clément	+ 3' 54"
8	Emile Daems (BEL)	Philco	+ 4' 35"
9	Rik Van Looy (BEL)	Flandria–Faema–Clément	+ 4' 43"
10	Tom Simpson (GBR)	Gitane–Leroux–Dunlop–R. Geminiani	+ 5' 08"

== Stage 8a ==
1 July 1962 — Saint-Nazaire to Luçon, 155 km (96 mi)

Stage 8a result
Rank	Rider	Team	Time
1	Mario Minieri (ITA)	Ghigi	3h 29' 01"
2	Rino Benedetti (ITA)	Ignis–Moschettieri	+ 0"
3	Jean Graczyk (FRA)	Saint-Raphaël–Helyett–Hutchinson	+ 0"
4	Bas Maliepaard (NED)	Gitane–Leroux–Dunlop–R. Geminiani	+ 0"
5	Dino Bruni (ITA)	Gazzola–Fiorelli–Hutchinson	+ 0"
6	André Darrigade (FRA)	Gitane–Leroux–Dunlop–R. Geminiani	+ 0"
7	Edgard Sorgeloos (BEL)	Flandria–Faema–Clément	+ 0"
8	Bernard Viot (FRA)	Peugeot–BP–Dunlop	+ 0"
9	Michel Van Aerde (BEL)	Carpano	+ 0"
10	Pino Cerami (BEL)	Peugeot–BP–Dunlop	+ 0"

General classification after stage 8a
Rank	Rider	Team	Time
1	André Darrigade (FRA)	Gitane–Leroux–Dunlop–R. Geminiani	40h 20' 00"
2	Tom Simpson (GBR)	Gitane–Leroux–Dunlop–R. Geminiani	+ 2' 46"
3	Luis Otaño (ESP)	Philco	+ 3' 40"
4	Albertus Geldermans (NED)	Saint-Raphaël–Helyett–Hutchinson	+ 3' 41"
5	Gilbert Desmet (BEL)	Carpano	+ 3' 54"
6	Willy Schroeders (BEL)	Flandria–Faema–Clément	+ 4' 00"
7	Jos Hoevenaers (BEL)	Philco	+ 4' 04"
8	Henry Anglade (FRA)	Liberia–Grammont–Wolber	+ 4' 07"
9	Jean Stablinski (FRA)	Saint-Raphaël–Helyett–Hutchinson	+ 4' 40"
10	Michel Van Aerde (BEL)	Carpano	+ 5' 42"

== Stage 8b ==
1 July 1962 — Luçon to La Rochelle, 43 km (27 mi) (ITT)

Stage 8b result
Rank	Rider	Team	Time
1	Jacques Anquetil (FRA)	Saint-Raphaël–Helyett–Hutchinson	54' 04"
2	Ercole Baldini (ITA)	Ignis–Moschettieri	+ 22"
3	Rudi Altig (FRG)	Saint-Raphaël–Helyett–Hutchinson	+ 46"
4	Jef Planckaert (BEL)	Flandria–Faema–Clément	+ 1' 07"
5	Antonio Suárez (ESP)	Ghigi	+ 1' 25"
6	Guido Carlesi (ITA)	Philco	+ 1' 41"
7	Willy Vanden Berghen (BEL)	Mercier–BP–Hutchinson	+ 1' 49"
8	Albertus Geldermans (NED)	Saint-Raphaël–Helyett–Hutchinson	+ 1' 54"
9	Diego Ronchini (ITA)	Ghigi	+ 1' 55"
10	Antonio Bailetti (ITA)	Carpano	+ 1' 58"

General classification after stage 8b
Rank	Rider	Team	Time
1	André Darrigade (FRA)	Gitane–Leroux–Dunlop–R. Geminiani	41h 18in 18"
2	Tom Simpson (GBR)	Gitane–Leroux–Dunlop–R. Geminiani	+ 51"
3	Albertus Geldermans (NED)	Saint-Raphaël–Helyett–Hutchinson	+ 1' 21"
4	Gilbert Desmet (BEL)	Carpano	+ 1' 59"
5	Henry Anglade (FRA)	Liberia–Grammont–Wolber	+ 2' 00"
6	Luis Otaño (ESP)	Philco	+ 2' 16"
7	Rudi Altig (FRG)	Saint-Raphaël–Helyett–Hutchinson	+ 3' 20"
8	Jean Stablinski (FRA)	Saint-Raphaël–Helyett–Hutchinson	+ 3' 21"
9	Jos Hoevenaers (BEL)	Philco	+ 3' 35"
10	Jef Planckaert (BEL)	Flandria–Faema–Clément	+ 3' 36"

== Stage 9 ==
2 July 1962 — La Rochelle to Bordeaux, 214 km (133 mi)

Stage 9 result
Rank	Rider	Team	Time
1	Antonio Bailetti (ITA)	Carpano	5h 11' 17"
2	Jean Graczyk (FRA)	Saint-Raphaël–Helyett–Hutchinson	+ 0"
3	Franco Magnani (ITA)	Ghigi	+ 0"
4	Huub Zilverberg (NED)	Flandria–Faema–Clément	+ 0"
5	Willy Schroeders (BEL)	Flandria–Faema–Clément	+ 0"
6	Frans Melckenbeeck (FRA)	Mercier–BP–Hutchinson	+ 0"
7	Jean-Baptiste Claes (BEL)	Wiel's–Groene Leeuw	+ 0"
8	Édouard Delberghe (FRA)	Liberia–Grammont–Wolber	+ 0"
9	Alan Ramsbottom (GBR)	Pelforth–Sauvage–Lejeune	+ 0"
10	Jean Milesi (FRA)	Liberia–Grammont–Wolber	+ 0"

General classification after stage 9
Rank	Rider	Team	Time
1	Willy Schroeders (BEL)	Flandria–Faema–Clément	46h 33' 41"
2	André Darrigade (FRA)	Gitane–Leroux–Dunlop–R. Geminiani	+ 45"
3	Tom Simpson (GBR)	Gitane–Leroux–Dunlop–R. Geminiani	+ 1' 36"
4	Albertus Geldermans (NED)	Saint-Raphaël–Helyett–Hutchinson	+ 2' 06"
5	Gilbert Desmet (BEL)	Carpano	+ 2' 44"
6	Henry Anglade (FRA)	Liberia–Grammont–Wolber	+ 2' 45"
7	Luis Otaño (ESP)	Philco	+ 3' 01"
8	Rudi Altig (FRG)	Saint-Raphaël–Helyett–Hutchinson	+ 4' 05"
9	Jean Stablinski (FRA)	Saint-Raphaël–Helyett–Hutchinson	+ 4' 06"
10	Jos Hoevenaers (BEL)	Philco	+ 4' 20"

== Stage 10 ==
3 July 1962 — Bordeaux to Bayonne, 184.5 km (114.6 mi)

Stage 10 result
Rank	Rider	Team	Time
1	Willy Vannitsen (BEL)	Wiel's–Groene Leeuw	4h 54' 2"
2	Giancarlo Manzoni (ITA)	Ignis–Moschettieri	+ 0"
3	Rudi Altig (FRG)	Saint-Raphaël–Helyett–Hutchinson	+ 0"
4	Bernard Viot (FRA)	Peugeot–BP–Dunlop	+ 0"
5	Jean Graczyk (FRA)	Saint-Raphaël–Helyett–Hutchinson	+ 0"
6	Giancarlo Gentina (ITA)	Carpano	+ 0"
7	Rik Van Looy (BEL)	Flandria–Faema–Clément	+ 0"
8	Michel Van Aerde (BEL)	Carpano	+ 0"
9	Gilbert Desmet (BEL)	Carpano	+ 0"
10	Arthur Decabooter (BEL)	Liberia–Grammont–Wolber	+ 0"

General classification after stage 10
Rank	Rider	Team	Time
1	Willy Schroeders (BEL)	Flandria–Faema–Clément	51h 27' 43"
2	André Darrigade (FRA)	Gitane–Leroux–Dunlop–R. Geminiani	+ 45"
3	Tom Simpson (GBR)	Gitane–Leroux–Dunlop–R. Geminiani	+ 1' 36"
4	Albertus Geldermans (NED)	Saint-Raphaël–Helyett–Hutchinson	+ 2' 06"
5	Gilbert Desmet (BEL)	Carpano	+ 2' 44"
6	Henry Anglade (FRA)	Liberia–Grammont–Wolber	+ 2' 45"
7	Luis Otaño (ESP)	Philco	+ 3' 01"
8	Rudi Altig (FRG)	Saint-Raphaël–Helyett–Hutchinson	+ 4' 05"
9	Jean Stablinski (FRA)	Saint-Raphaël–Helyett–Hutchinson	+ 4' 06"
10	Jef Planckaert (BEL)	Flandria–Faema–Clément	+ 4' 21"
