= 1962 Tour de France, Stage 11 to Stage 22 =

Cycling race stages

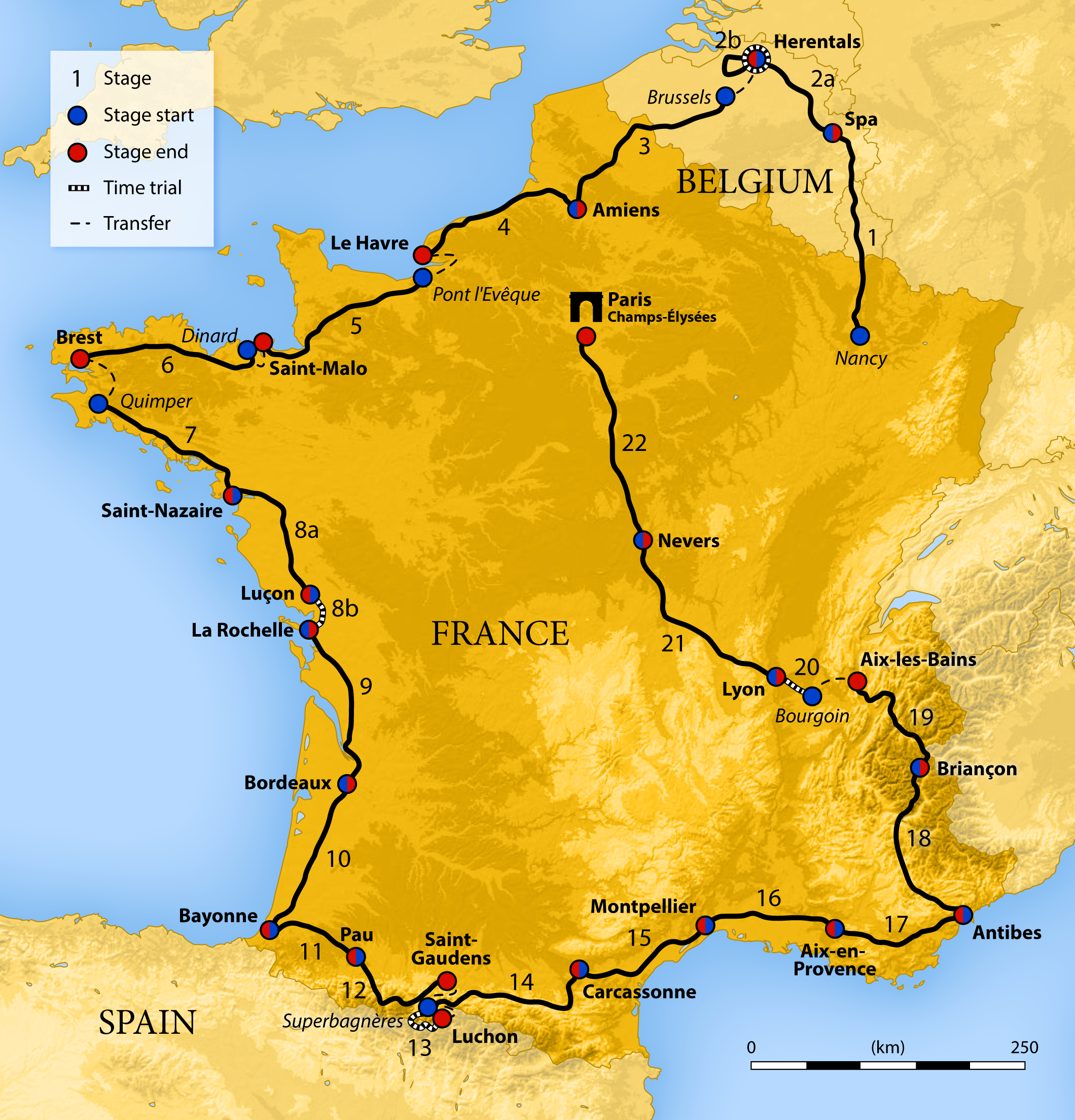
Route of the 1962 Tour de France; followed counterclockwise, starting in Nancy and finishing in Paris

The 1962 Tour de France was the 49th edition of the Tour de France, one of cycling's Grand Tours. It took place between from 24 June and 15 July, with 22 stages covering a distance of 4,274 km (2,656 mi). After more than 30 years, the Tour was again contested by trade teams. Frenchman Jacques Anquetil defended his title, winning his third Tour de France.

== Classification standings ==
Legend (Note: Jerseys appearing in the table on the left of the page indicate those worn by the cyclist during the particular stage, while those appearing in the table on the right of the page indicate those awarded to the cyclist after the stage.)
A yellow jersey	Denotes the leader of the general classification	A green jersey	Denotes the leader of the points classification

== Stage 11 ==
4 July 1962 — Bayonne to Pau, 155.5 km (96.6 mi)

Stage 11 result
Rank	Rider	Team	Time
1	Eddy Pauwels (BEL)	Wiel's–Groene Leeuw	3h 54' 36"
2	Arthur Decabooter (BEL)	Liberia–Grammont–Wolber	+ 4' 20"
3	Mario Minieri (ITA)	Ghigi	+ 4' 22"
4	Victor Van Schil (FRA)	Mercier–BP–Hutchinson	+ 4' 24"
5	Emile Daems (BEL)	Philco	+ 4' 26"
6	Jean Graczyk (FRA)	Saint-Raphaël–Helyett–Hutchinson	+ 4' 26"
7	Marcel Ongenae (BEL)	Flandria–Faema–Clément	+ 4' 26"
8	Bernard Viot (FRA)	Peugeot–BP–Dunlop	+ 4' 26"
9	Joseph Groussard (FRA)	Pelforth–Sauvage–Lejeune	+ 4' 26"
10	Giancarlo Manzoni (ITA)	Ignis–Moschettieri	+ 4' 26"

General classification after stage 11
Rank	Rider	Team	Time
1	Willy Schroeders (BEL)	Flandria–Faema–Clément	55h 26' 45"
2	André Darrigade (FRA)	Gitane–Leroux–Dunlop–R. Geminiani	+ 45"
3	Tom Simpson (GBR)	Gitane–Leroux–Dunlop–R. Geminiani	+ 1' 36"
4	Albertus Geldermans (NED)	Saint-Raphaël–Helyett–Hutchinson	+ 2' 06"
5	Gilbert Desmet (BEL)	Carpano	+ 2' 44"
6	Henry Anglade (FRA)	Liberia–Grammont–Wolber	+ 2' 45"
7	Luis Otaño (ESP)	Philco	+ 3' 01"
8	Rudi Altig (FRG)	Saint-Raphaël–Helyett–Hutchinson	+ 4' 05"
9	Jean Stablinski (FRA)	Saint-Raphaël–Helyett–Hutchinson	+ 4' 06"
10	Jef Planckaert (BEL)	Flandria–Faema–Clément	+ 4' 21"

== Stage 12 ==
5 July 1962 — Pau to Saint-Gaudens, 207.5 km (128.9 mi)

Stage result
Rank	Rider	Team	Time
1	Robert Cazala (FRA)	Mercier–BP–Hutchinson	5h 59' 27"
2	Guido Carlesi (ITA)	Philco	+ 0"
3	Gilbert Desmet (BEL)	Carpano	+ 0"
4	Jacques Anquetil (FRA)	Saint-Raphaël–Helyett–Hutchinson	+ 0"
5	Eddy Pauwels (BEL)	Wiel's–Groene Leeuw	+ 0"
6	Armand Desmet (BEL)	Flandria–Faema–Clément	+ 0"
7	Imerio Massignan (ITA)	Legnano–Pirelli	+ 0"
8	Federico Bahamontes (ESP)	Margnat–Paloma–D'Alessandro	+ 0"
9	Albertus Geldermans (NED)	Saint-Raphaël–Helyett–Hutchinson	+ 0"
10	Victor Van Schil (BEL)	Mercier–BP–Hutchinson	+ 0"

General classification after stage 12
Rank	Rider	Team	Time
1	Tom Simpson (GBR)	Gitane–Leroux–Dunlop–R. Geminiani	61h 27' 48"
2	Albertus Geldermans (NED)	Saint-Raphaël–Helyett–Hutchinson	+ 30"
3	Gilbert Desmet (BEL)	Carpano	+ 1' 08"
4	Luis Otaño (ESP)	Philco	+ 1' 25"
5	Jef Planckaert (BEL)	Flandria–Faema–Clément	+ 2' 45"
6	Jacques Anquetil (FRA)	Saint-Raphaël–Helyett–Hutchinson	+ 3' 20"
7	Jos Hoevenaers (BEL)	Philco	+ 3' 32"
8	Hans Junkermann (BEL)	Wiel's–Groene Leeuw	+ 5' 14"
9	Guido Carlesi (ITA)	Philco	+ 5' 35"
10	Antonio Suárez (ESP)	Ghigi	+ 5' 35"

== Stage 13 ==
6 July 1962 — Luchon to Superbagnères, 18.5 km (11.5 mi) (ITT)

Stage 13 result
Rank	Rider	Team	Time
1	Federico Bahamontes (ESP)	Margnat–Paloma–D'Alessandro	47' 23"
2	Jef Planckaert (BEL)	Flandria–Faema–Clément	+ 1' 25"
3	Jacques Anquetil (FRA)	Saint-Raphaël–Helyett–Hutchinson	+ 1' 28"
4	Charly Gaul (LUX)	Gazzola–Fiorelli–Hutchinson	+ 1' 29"
5	Hans Junkermann (BEL)	Wiel's–Groene Leeuw	+ 2' 31"
6	Rolf Wolfshohl (FRG)	Gitane–Leroux–Dunlop–R. Geminiani	+ 2' 23"
7	Raymond Poulidor (FRA)	Mercier–BP–Hutchinson	+ 3' 03"
8	Willy Vanden Berghen (BEL)	Mercier–BP–Hutchinson	+ 3' 13"
9	Jean-Claude Lebaube (FRA)	Gitane–Leroux–Dunlop–R. Geminiani	+ 3' 19"
10	Gilbert Desmet (BEL)	Carpano	+ 3' 32"

General classification after stage 13
Rank	Rider	Team	Time
1	Jef Planckaert (BEL)	Flandria–Faema–Clément	62h 18' 51"
2	Gilbert Desmet (BEL)	Carpano	+ 50"
3	Albertus Geldermans (NED)	Saint-Raphaël–Helyett–Hutchinson	+ 1' 05"
4	Jacques Anquetil (FRA)	Saint-Raphaël–Helyett–Hutchinson	+ 1' 08"
5	Luis Otaño (ESP)	Philco	+ 2' 00"
6	Tom Simpson (GBR)	Gitane–Leroux–Dunlop–R. Geminiani	+ 2' 00"
7	Hans Junkermann (BEL)	Wiel's–Groene Leeuw	+ 4' 5"
8	Jos Hoevenaers (BEL)	Philco	+ 6' 33"
9	Antonio Suárez (ESP)	Ghigi	+ 7' 28"
10	Imerio Massignan (ITA)	Legnano–Pirelli	+ 7' 52"

== Stage 14 ==
7 July 1962 — Luchon to Carcassonne, 215 km (134 mi)

Stage 14 result
Rank	Rider	Team	Time
1	Jean Stablinski (FRA)	Saint-Raphaël–Helyett–Hutchinson	6h 1' 50"
2	Rudi Altig (FRG)	Saint-Raphaël–Helyett–Hutchinson	+ 12"
3	Emile Daems (BEL)	Philco	+ 12"
4	Giancarlo Manzoni (ITA)	Ignis–Moschettieri	+ 12"
5	André Darrigade (FRA)	Gitane–Leroux–Dunlop–R. Geminiani	+ 12"
6	Jean Graczyk (FRA)	Saint-Raphaël–Helyett–Hutchinson	+ 12"
7	Marcel Ongenae (BEL)	Flandria–Faema–Clément	+ 12"
8	Willy Vanden Berghen (BEL)	Mercier–BP–Hutchinson	+ 12"
9	Eddy Pauwels (BEL)	Wiel's–Groene Leeuw	+ 12"
10	Rolf Wolfshohl (FRG)	Gitane–Leroux–Dunlop–R. Geminiani	+ 12"

General classification after stage 14
Rank	Rider	Team	Time
1	Jef Planckaert (BEL)	Flandria–Faema–Clément	68h 21' 25"
2	Gilbert Desmet (BEL)	Carpano	+ 50"
3	Albertus Geldermans (NED)	Saint-Raphaël–Helyett–Hutchinson	+ 1' 05"
4	Jacques Anquetil (FRA)	Saint-Raphaël–Helyett–Hutchinson	+ 1' 08"
5	Tom Simpson (GBR)	Gitane–Leroux–Dunlop–R. Geminiani	+ 2' 00"
6	Antonio Suárez (ESP)	Ghigi	+ 7' 28"
7	Imerio Massignan (ITA)	Legnano–Pirelli	+ 7' 52"
8	Jean-Claude Lebaube (FRA)	Gitane–Leroux–Dunlop–R. Geminiani	+ 7' 57"
9	Guido Carlesi (ITA)	Philco	+ 8' 57"
10	Charly Gaul (LUX)	Gazzola–Fiorelli–Hutchinson	+ 9' 27"

== Stage 15 ==
8 July 1962 — Carcassonne to Montpellier, 196.5 km (122.1 mi)

Stage 15 result
Rank	Rider	Team	Time
1	Willy Vannitsen (BEL)	Wiel's–Groene Leeuw	5h 12' 44"
2	Rudi Altig (FRG)	Saint-Raphaël–Helyett–Hutchinson	+ 0"
3	Rino Benedetti (ITA)	Ignis–Moschettieri	+ 0"
4	André Darrigade (FRA)	Gitane–Leroux–Dunlop–R. Geminiani	+ 0"
5	Robert Cazala (FRA)	Mercier–BP–Hutchinson	+ 0"
6	Jean Graczyk (FRA)	Saint-Raphaël–Helyett–Hutchinson	+ 0"
7	Giancarlo Gentina (ITA)	Carpano	+ 0"
8	Gilbert Desmet (BEL)	Carpano	+ 0"
9	Piet van Est (NED)	Flandria–Faema–Clément	+ 0"
10	Bernard Viot (FRA)	Peugeot–BP–Dunlop	+ 0"

General classification after stage 15
Rank	Rider	Team	Time
1	Jef Planckaert (BEL)	Flandria–Faema–Clément	73h 34' 09"
2	Gilbert Desmet (BEL)	Carpano	+ 50"
3	Albertus Geldermans (NED)	Saint-Raphaël–Helyett–Hutchinson	+ 1' 05"
4	Jacques Anquetil (FRA)	Saint-Raphaël–Helyett–Hutchinson	+ 1' 08"
5	Tom Simpson (GBR)	Gitane–Leroux–Dunlop–R. Geminiani	+ 2' 00"
6	Antonio Suárez (ESP)	Ghigi	+ 7' 28"
7	Imerio Massignan (ITA)	Legnano–Pirelli	+ 7' 52"
8	Jean-Claude Lebaube (FRA)	Gitane–Leroux–Dunlop–R. Geminiani	+ 7' 57"
9	Guido Carlesi (ITA)	Philco	+ 8' 57"
10	Charly Gaul (LUX)	Gazzola–Fiorelli–Hutchinson	+ 9' 27"

== Stage 16 ==
9 July 1962 — Montpellier to Aix-en-Provence, 185 km (115 mi)

Stage 16 result
Rank	Rider	Team	Time
1	Emile Daems (BEL)	Philco	4h 33' 13"
2	Antonio Bailetti (ITA)	Carpano	+ 3' 02"
3	Bas Maliepaard (NED)	Gitane–Leroux–Dunlop–R. Geminiani	+ 7' 57"
4	Pierino Baffi (ITA)	Ghigi	+ 7' 57"
5	Giancarlo Gentina (ITA)	Carpano	+ 7' 57"
6	Giuseppe Sartore (ITA)	Carpano	+ 7' 57"
7	Jaak De Boever (BEL)	Liberia–Grammont–Wolber	+ 7' 57"
8	Claude Mattio (FRA)	Pelforth–Sauvage–Lejeune	+ 7' 57"
9	Jean Le Lan (FRA)	Saint-Raphaël–Helyett–Hutchinson	+ 7' 57"
10	Rudi Altig (FRG)	Saint-Raphaël–Helyett–Hutchinson	+ 9' 19"

General classification after stage 16
Rank	Rider	Team	Time
1	Jef Planckaert (BEL)	Flandria–Faema–Clément	78h 16' 41"
2	Gilbert Desmet (BEL)	Carpano	+ 50"
3	Jacques Anquetil (FRA)	Saint-Raphaël–Helyett–Hutchinson	+ 1' 08"
4	Albertus Geldermans (NED)	Saint-Raphaël–Helyett–Hutchinson	+ 1' 35"
5	Tom Simpson (GBR)	Gitane–Leroux–Dunlop–R. Geminiani	+ 2' 00"
6	Antonio Suárez (ESP)	Ghigi	+ 7' 28"
7	Imerio Massignan (ITA)	Legnano–Pirelli	+ 7' 52"
8	Jean-Claude Lebaube (FRA)	Gitane–Leroux–Dunlop–R. Geminiani	+ 7' 57"
9	Guido Carlesi (ITA)	Philco	+ 8' 57"
10	Charly Gaul (LUX)	Gazzola–Fiorelli–Hutchinson	+ 9' 27"

== Stage 17 ==
10 July 1962 — Aix-en-Provence to Antibes, 201 km (125 mi)

Stage 17 result
Rank	Rider	Team	Time
1	Rudi Altig (FRG)	Saint-Raphaël–Helyett–Hutchinson	5h 27' 36"
2	Jos Hoevenaers (BEL)	Philco	+ 0"
3	Édouard Bihouée (FRA)	Mercier–BP–Hutchinson	+ 0"
4	Édouard Delberghe (FRA)	Liberia–Grammont–Wolber	+ 0"
5	André Darrigade (FRA)	Gitane–Leroux–Dunlop–R. Geminiani	+ 6' 11"
6	Rolf Wolfshohl (FRG)	Gitane–Leroux–Dunlop–R. Geminiani	+ 6' 11"
7	Giancarlo Manzoni (ITA)	Ignis–Moschettieri	+ 6' 11"
8	Robert Cazala (FRA)	Mercier–BP–Hutchinson	+ 6' 11"
9	Bernard Viot (FRA)	Peugeot–BP–Dunlop	+ 6' 11"
10	Gilbert Desmet (BEL)	Carpano	+ 6' 11"

General classification after stage 17
Rank	Rider	Team	Time
1	Jef Planckaert (BEL)	Flandria–Faema–Clément	83h 50' 28"
2	Gilbert Desmet (BEL)	Carpano	+ 50"
3	Jacques Anquetil (FRA)	Saint-Raphaël–Helyett–Hutchinson	+ 1' 08"
4	Albertus Geldermans (NED)	Saint-Raphaël–Helyett–Hutchinson	+ 1' 35"
5	Tom Simpson (GBR)	Gitane–Leroux–Dunlop–R. Geminiani	+ 2' 00"
6	Antonio Suárez (ESP)	Ghigi	+ 7' 28"
7	Imerio Massignan (ITA)	Legnano–Pirelli	+ 7' 52"
8	Jean-Claude Lebaube (FRA)	Gitane–Leroux–Dunlop–R. Geminiani	+ 7' 57"
9	Guido Carlesi (ITA)	Philco	+ 8' 57"
10	Charly Gaul (LUX)	Gazzola–Fiorelli–Hutchinson	+ 9' 27"

== Stage 18 ==
11 July 1962 — Antibes to Briançon, 241.5 km (150.1 mi)

Stage 18 result
Rank	Rider	Team	Time
1	Emile Daems (BEL)	Philco	9h 20' 6"
2	Imerio Massignan (ITA)	Legnano–Pirelli	+ 1"
3	Raymond Poulidor (FRA)	Mercier–BP–Hutchinson	+ 3"
4	Jacques Anquetil (FRA)	Saint-Raphaël–Helyett–Hutchinson	+ 3"
5	Charly Gaul (LUX)	Gazzola–Fiorelli–Hutchinson	+ 3"
6	Jef Planckaert (BEL)	Flandria–Faema–Clément	+ 3"
7	Federico Bahamontes (ESP)	Margnat–Paloma–D'Alessandro	+ 5"
8	Armand Desmet (BEL)	Flandria–Faema–Clément	+ 16"
9	Tom Simpson (GBR)	Gitane–Leroux–Dunlop–R. Geminiani	+ 1' 19"
10	Eddy Pauwels (BEL)	Wiel's–Groene Leeuw	+ 1' 33"

General classification after stage 18
Rank	Rider	Team	Time
1	Jef Planckaert (BEL)	Flandria–Faema–Clément	93h 10' 37"
2	Jacques Anquetil (FRA)	Saint-Raphaël–Helyett–Hutchinson	+ 1' 08"
3	Tom Simpson (GBR)	Gitane–Leroux–Dunlop–R. Geminiani	+ 3' 16"
4	Gilbert Desmet (BEL)	Carpano	+ 3' 39"
5	Imerio Massignan (ITA)	Legnano–Pirelli	+ 7' 20"
6	Albertus Geldermans (NED)	Saint-Raphaël–Helyett–Hutchinson	+ 7' 23"
7	Jean-Claude Lebaube (FRA)	Gitane–Leroux–Dunlop–R. Geminiani	+ 9' 27"
8	Charly Gaul (LUX)	Gazzola–Fiorelli–Hutchinson	+ 9' 27"
9	Raymond Poulidor (FRA)	Mercier–BP–Hutchinson	+ 9' 59"
10	Eddy Pauwels (BEL)	Wiel's–Groene Leeuw	+ 11' 45"

== Stage 19 ==
12 July 1962 — Briançon to Aix-les-Bains, 204.5 km (127.1 mi)

Stage 19 result
Rank	Rider	Team	Time
1	Raymond Poulidor (FRA)	Mercier–BP–Hutchinson	6h 25' 32"
2	Henry Anglade (FRA)	Liberia–Grammont–Wolber	+ 02' 30"
3	Federico Bahamontes (ESP)	Margnat–Paloma–D'Alessandro	+ 02' 30"
4	André Darrigade (FRA)	Gitane–Leroux–Dunlop–R. Geminiani	+ 3' 16"
5	Emile Daems (BEL)	Philco	+ 3' 16"
6	Jean Gainche (FRA)	Mercier–BP–Hutchinson	+ 3' 16"
7	Renzo Fontona (ITA)	Legnano–Pirelli	+ 3' 16"
8	Imerio Massignan (ITA)	Legnano–Pirelli	+ 3' 16"
9	Armand Desmet (BEL)	Flandria–Faema–Clément	+ 3' 16"
10	Piet van Est (NED)	Flandria–Faema–Clément	+ 3' 16"

General classification after stage 19
Rank	Rider	Team	Time
1	Jef Planckaert (BEL)	Flandria–Faema–Clément	99h 39' 25"
2	Jacques Anquetil (FRA)	Saint-Raphaël–Helyett–Hutchinson	+ 1' 08"
3	Raymond Poulidor (FRA)	Mercier–BP–Hutchinson	+ 5' 43"
4	Gilbert Desmet (BEL)	Carpano	+ 7' 15"
5	Albertus Geldermans (NED)	Saint-Raphaël–Helyett–Hutchinson	+ 7' 23"
6	Tom Simpson (GBR)	Gitane–Leroux–Dunlop–R. Geminiani	+ 7' 30"
7	Imerio Massignan (ITA)	Legnano–Pirelli	+ 7' 50"
8	Charly Gaul (LUX)	Gazzola–Fiorelli–Hutchinson	+ 9' 27"
9	Eddy Pauwels (BEL)	Wiel's–Groene Leeuw	+ 12' 15"
10	Jean-Claude Lebaube (FRA)	Gitane–Leroux–Dunlop–R. Geminiani	+ 14' 37"

== Stage 20 ==
13 July 1962 — Bourgoin to Lyon, 68 km (42 mi) (ITT)

Stage 20 result
Rank	Rider	Team	Time
1	Jacques Anquetil (FRA)	Saint-Raphaël–Helyett–Hutchinson	1h 33' 35"
2	Ercole Baldini (ITA)	Ignis–Moschettieri	+ 2' 59"
3	Raymond Poulidor (FRA)	Mercier–BP–Hutchinson	+ 5' 01"
4	Jef Planckaert (BEL)	Flandria–Faema–Clément	+ 5' 19"
5	Gilbert Desmet (BEL)	Carpano	+ 6' 06"
6	Henry Anglade (FRA)	Liberia–Grammont–Wolber	+ 6' 15"
7	Albertus Geldermans (NED)	Saint-Raphaël–Helyett–Hutchinson	+ 6' 49"
8	Victor Van Schil (FRA)	Mercier–BP–Hutchinson	+ 7' 31"
9	Emile Daems (BEL)	Philco	+ 8' 06"
10	Antonio Bailetti (ITA)	Carpano	+ 8' 00"

General classification after stage 20
Rank	Rider	Team	Time
1	Jacques Anquetil (FRA)	Saint-Raphaël–Helyett–Hutchinson	101h 13' 08"
2	Jef Planckaert (BEL)	Flandria–Faema–Clément	+ 05' 11"
3	Raymond Poulidor (FRA)	Mercier–BP–Hutchinson	+ 10' 36"
4	Gilbert Desmet (BEL)	Carpano	+ 13' 13"
5	Albertus Geldermans (NED)	Saint-Raphaël–Helyett–Hutchinson	+ 14' 04"
6	Tom Simpson (GBR)	Gitane–Leroux–Dunlop–R. Geminiani	+ 17' 21"
7	Imerio Massignan (ITA)	Legnano–Pirelli	+ 18' 02"
8	Charly Gaul (LUX)	Gazzola–Fiorelli–Hutchinson	+ 18' 02"
9	Ercole Baldini (ITA)	Ignis–Moschettieri	+ 19' 00"
10	Eddy Pauwels (BEL)	Wiel's–Groene Leeuw	+ 23' 04"

== Stage 21 ==
14 July 1962 — Lyon to Nevers, 232 km (144 mi)

Stage 21 result
Rank	Rider	Team	Time
1	Dino Bruni (ITA)	Gazzola–Fiorelli–Hutchinson	6h 27' 02"
2	Joseph Groussard (FRA)	Pelforth–Sauvage–Lejeune	+ 0"
3	Jean Graczyk (FRA)	Saint-Raphaël–Helyett–Hutchinson	+ 0"
4	Arnaldo Pambianco (ITA)	Ignis–Moschettieri	+ 0"
5	Giuseppe Tonucci (ITA)	Ignis–Moschettieri	+ 0"
6	Luigi Sarti (ITA)	Ghigi	+ 0"
7	Jean Stablinski (FRA)	Saint-Raphaël–Helyett–Hutchinson	+ 0"
8	Raymond Poulidor (FRA)	Mercier–BP–Hutchinson	+ 0"
9	Daniel Doom (BEL)	Wiel's–Groene Leeuw	+ 0"
10	Guillaume Van Tongerloo (BEL)	Flandria–Faema–Clément	+ 0"

General classification after stage 21
Rank	Rider	Team	Time
1	Jacques Anquetil (FRA)	Saint-Raphaël–Helyett–Hutchinson	107h 40' 22"
2	Jef Planckaert (BEL)	Flandria–Faema–Clément	+ 4' 59"
3	Raymond Poulidor (FRA)	Mercier–BP–Hutchinson	+ 10' 24"
4	Gilbert Desmet (BEL)	Carpano	+ 13' 01"
5	Albertus Geldermans (NED)	Saint-Raphaël–Helyett–Hutchinson	+ 14' 04"
6	Tom Simpson (GBR)	Gitane–Leroux–Dunlop–R. Geminiani	+ 17' 09"
7	Imerio Massignan (ITA)	Legnano–Pirelli	+ 17' 50"
8	Charly Gaul (LUX)	Gazzola–Fiorelli–Hutchinson	+ 18' 02"
9	Ercole Baldini (ITA)	Ignis–Moschettieri	+ 19'
10	Eddy Pauwels (BEL)	Wiel's–Groene Leeuw	+ 23' 04"

== Stage 22 ==
15 July 1962 — Nevers to Paris, 271 km (168 mi)

Stage 22 result
Rank	Rider	Team	Time
1	Rino Benedetti (ITA)	Ignis–Moschettieri	6h 50' 40"
2	Marcel Ongenae (BEL)	Flandria–Faema–Clément	+ 0"
3	Pierre Beuffeuil (FRA)	Mercier–BP–Hutchinson	+ 0"
4	Piet van Est (NED)	Flandria–Faema–Clément	+ 0"
5	Pierino Baffi (ITA)	Ghigi	+ 0"
6	Joseph Groussard (FRA)	Pelforth–Sauvage–Lejeune	+ 0"
7	Antonio Bailetti (ITA)	Carpano	+ 0"
8	Giorgio Zancanaro (ITA)	Philco	+ 0"
9	Edgard Sorgeloos (BEL)	Flandria–Faema–Clément	+ 0"
10	Jean Graczyk (FRA)	Saint-Raphaël–Helyett–Hutchinson	+ 0"

Final general classification (1–10)
Rank	Rider	Team	Time
1	Jacques Anquetil (FRA)	Saint-Raphaël–Helyett–Hutchinson	114h 31' 54"
2	Jef Planckaert (BEL)	Flandria–Faema–Clément	+ 4' 59"
3	Raymond Poulidor (FRA)	Mercier–BP–Hutchinson	+ 10' 24"
4	Gilbert Desmet (BEL)	Carpano	+ 13' 01"
5	Albertus Geldermans (NED)	Saint-Raphaël–Helyett–Hutchinson	+ 14' 05"
6	Tom Simpson (GBR)	Gitane–Leroux–Dunlop–R. Geminiani	+ 17' 09"
7	Imerio Massignan (ITA)	Legnano–Pirelli	+ 17' 50"
8	Ercole Baldini (ITA)	Ignis–Moschettieri	+ 19' 00"
9	Charly Gaul (LUX)	Gazzola–Fiorelli–Hutchinson	+ 19' 11"
10	Eddy Pauwels (BEL)	Wiel's–Groene Leeuw	+ 23' 04"
