= Arnaldo Di Maria =

Italian cyclist

Personal information
- Born: 3 December 1935
- Died: 16 February 2011 (aged 75)

Cycling career
- Sport: Cycling
- Role: Rider

Arnaldo Di Maria (3 December 1935 – 16 February 2011) was an Italian racing cyclist. He rode in the 1962 Tour de France.
