= Luigi Mele =

Italian cyclist (1937–2023)

Personal information
- Born: 11 September 1937 Calvi Risorta, Italy
- Died: 14 April 2023 (aged 85) Calvi Risorta, Italy

Cycling career
- Sport: Cycling
- Discipline: Road
- Role: Rider

Professional teams
- 1960: Carpano
- 1961–1964: Gazzola–Fiorelli
- 1966: Queen Anne

Luigi Mele (11 September 1937 – 14 April 2023) was an Italian racing cyclist. He rode in the 1962 Tour de France as well as in three editions of the Giro d'Italia.

Mele died in Calvi Risorta on 14 April 2023, at the age of 85.

== Major results ==
1962
1st Stage 6 Tour de Suisse
2nd Gran Premio Industria e Commercio di Prato
8th Coppa Placci
1963
3rd GP Alghero
1964
5th Coppa Placci
