= Emilio Ciolli =

Italian cyclist

Personal information
- Born: 27 January 1933
- Died: 23 December 2012 (aged 79)

Cycling career
- Sport: Cycling
- Role: Rider

Emilio Ciolli (27 January 1933 – 23 December 2012) was an Italian racing cyclist. He rode in the 1962 Tour de France.
