= Alessandro Rimessi =

Italian cyclist

Personal information
- Born: 4 August 1937 (age 89)

Cycling career
- Sport: Cycling
- Role: Rider

Alessandro Rimessi (born 4 August 1937) is an Italian racing cyclist. He rode in the 1962 Tour de France.
