= Sandro Cervellini =

Italian cyclist

Personal information
- Born: 24 August 1940
- Died: 8 August 2009 (aged 68)

Cycling career
- Sport: Cycling
- Role: Rider

Sandro Cervellini (24 August 1940 – 8 August 2009) was an Italian racing cyclist. He rode in the 1962 Tour de France.
