= René Abadie =

French cyclist

Personal information
- Born: 13 August 1935 Labroquère, France
- Died: 11 July 1996 (aged 60) Bayonne, France

Cycling career
- Sport: Cycling

Professional team
- Mercier

René Jean-Louis Célestin Abadie (13 August 1935 – 11 July 1996) was a French cyclist. He competed in the individual and team road race events at the 1956 Summer Olympics. He participated at 1962 Tour de France in the Mercier Team.
