= Bruno Martinato =

Luxembourgish cyclist

Personal information
- Born: 8 May 1935 (age 91)

Cycling career
- Sport: Cycling
- Role: Rider

Bruno Martinato (born 8 May 1935) is a Luxembourgish racing cyclist. He rode in the 1962 Tour de France.
