= Vittorio Chiarini =

Italian cyclist

Personal information
- Born: 15 February 1937 (age 89)

Cycling career
- Sport: Cycling
- Role: Rider

Vittorio Chiarini (born 15 February 1937) is an Italian racing cyclist. He rode in the 1962 Tour de France.
