= Catullo Ciacci =

Italian cyclist (1934–1996)

Personal information
- Born: 4 May 1934
- Died: 10 June 1996 (aged 62)

Cycling career
- Sport: Cycling
- Role: Rider

Catullo Ciacci (4 May 1934 – 10 June 1996) was an Italian racing cyclist. He rode in the 1962 Tour de France.
