= Giuseppe Sartore =

Italian cyclist

Personal information
- Born: 31 March 1937
- Died: 30 May 1995 (aged 58)

Cycling career
- Sport: Cycling
- Role: Rider

Giuseppe Sartore (31 March 1937 – 30 May 1995) was an Italian racing cyclist. He won stage 19 of the 1962 Giro d'Italia.
