= Italo Mazzacurati =

Italian cyclist

Personal information
- Born: 13 January 1932
- Died: 13 December 2013 (aged 81)

Cycling career
- Sport: Cycling
- Role: Rider

Italo Mazzacurati (13 January 1932 – 13 December 2013) was an Italian racing cyclist. He rode in the 1962 Tour de France.
