= Luigi Sarti =

Italian cyclist

Personal information
- Born: 25 November 1934 (age 91)

Cycling career
- Sport: Cycling
- Role: Rider

Luigi Sarti (born 25 November 1934) is an Italian racing cyclist. He rode in the 1962 Tour de France.
