= Francesco Miele =

Italian cyclist

Personal information
- Born: 27 January 1938
- Died: 22 July 2001 (aged 63)

Cycling career
- Sport: Cycling
- Role: Rider

Francesco Miele (27 January 1938 – 22 July 2001) was an Italian racing cyclist. He rode in the 1962 Tour de France.
