= Giuseppe Zorzi =

Italian cyclist (1938–2019)

Personal information
- Born: 25 March 1938 Bologna, Kingdom of Italy
- Died: 2 April 2019 (aged 81) Cona, Italy

Cycling career
- Sport: Cycling
- Role: Rider

Giuseppe Zorzi (25 March 1938 – 2 April 2019) was an Italian racing cyclist. He rode in the 1962 Tour de France.
