= Tiziano Galvanin =

Italian cyclist (1941–2004)

Personal information
- Born: 5 March 1941
- Died: 7 January 2004 (aged 62)

Cycling career
- Sport: Cycling
- Role: Rider

Tiziano Galvanin (5 March 1941 – 7 January 2004) was an Italian racing cyclist. He rode in the 1962 Tour de France.
