= Jean Le Lan =

French cyclist

Personal information
- Born: 10 January 1937
- Died: 1 January 2017 (aged 79)

Cycling career
- Sport: Cycling
- Role: Rider

Jean Le Lan (10 January 1937 – 1 January 2017) was a French racing cyclist. He rode in the 1962 Tour de France.
