= Fedele Rubagotti =

Italian cyclist

Personal information
- Born: 9 January 1940 (age 86)

Cycling career
- Sport: Cycling
- Role: Rider

Fedele Rubagotti (born 9 January 1940) is an Italian racing cyclist. He rode in the 1962 Tour de France.
