= Franco Magnani =

Italian cyclist

Personal information
- Born: 29 April 1938 (age 88)

Cycling career
- Sport: Cycling
- Role: Rider

Franco Magnani (born 29 April 1938) is an Italian racing cyclist. He won stage 15 of the 1963 Giro d'Italia.
