= Daniel Doom =

Belgian cyclist

- Doom with Flandria–Dr.Mann in 1959

Personal information
- Born: 28 November 1934 Kortemark, Belgium
- Died: 29 February 2020 (aged 85) Kortemark, Belgium

Cycling career
- Sport: Cycling
- Role: Rider

Daniel Doom (28 November 1934 – 29 February 2020) was a Belgian professional racing cyclist. He won the E3 Harelbeke in 1960.
