= Willy Schroeders =

Belgian cyclist

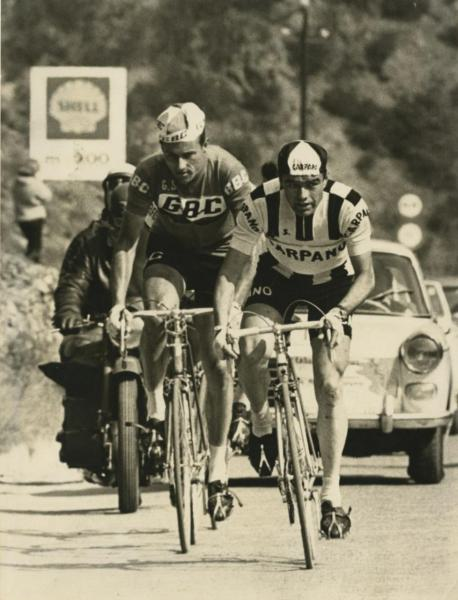
- Milan-Sanremo 1963, Franco Balmamion and Willy Schroeders

Personal information
- Full name: Willy Schroeders
- Born: 9 December 1932 Sint-Agatha-Rode, Huldenberg, Belgium
- Died: 28 October 2017 (aged 84)

Cycling career
- Sport: Cycling
- Discipline: Road
- Role: Rider

Willy Schroeders (9 December 1932 – 28 October 2017) was a Belgian professional road bicycle racer. He was professional from 1955 to 1965. He had 30 professional victories which included three stage wins in the Giro d'Italia as well as wearing the yellow jersey as leader of the general classification in the 1962 Tour de France.

== Palmarès ==
1956
GP du Brabant Wallon
Omloop van Midden-België
Omloop van het Westen
Puurs
Zellik
1957
Den Bosch
Ninove
Grote Prijs Stad Zottegem
Mechelen
Haacht
Sint-Lambrechts-Woluwe
Hoegaarden
1958
Deinze
Machelen
1959
GP des Ardennes
GP du Brabant Wallon
Mechelen
Aalter
1960
Drie Zustersteden
Wavre
Ninove
1961
Sint-Katelijne-Waver
Kumtich
Giro d'Italia:

Winner stages 3 and 19

1962
GP Stad Vilvoorde
Giro d'Italia:

Winner stage 6

Tour de France:

Leading general classification for three stages

1963
Brussel/Berchem - Ingooigem
Kontich
Halle–Ingooigem
