= Willy Vanden Berghen =

Belgian cyclist (1939–2022)

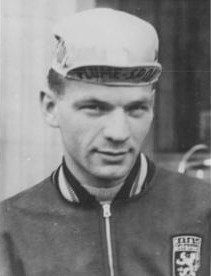
- Vanden Berghen in 1960

Personal information
- Born: 3 July 1939 Vilvoorde, Belgium
- Died: 30 March 2022 (aged 82)
- Height: 1.83 m (6 ft 0 in)
- Weight: 76 kg (168 lb)

Cycling career
- Sport: Cycling
- Discipline: Road
- Role: Rider

Major wins
- 1 stage Tour de France
Medal record
Representing Belgium
Men's road bicycle racing
Olympic Games
Bronze medal – third place	Rome 1960	Road race
World championships
Bronze medal – third place	1960 Sachsenring	Amateur's Road race

Willy Vanden Berghen (3 July 1939 – 30 March 2022) was a Belgian professional road bicycle racer. In 1960 he won two bronze medals in the road race, one at the amateur world championships and the other at the Olympic Games.

== Major results ==
1958
Gent-Staden
1959
Belgium national amateur track pursuit championship
Schaal Sels-Merksem
1960
GP de la Famenne
Heist-op-den-Berg
Ronde van Vlaanderen for amateurs
(bronze) Olympic Road Race
Braine-le-Comte
Waarschoot
1961
Buggenhout
Ronde van Oost-Vlaanderen
Jambes
1962
GP Monaco
Machelen
Sint-Lambrechts-Woluwe
Tour de France:

Winner stage 4

1963
Tienen
Petegem-aan-de-Leie
