= Édouard Bihouée =

French cyclist

Personal information
- Born: 6 April 1936 (age 90) Recquignies, France

Cycling career
- Sport: Cycling
- Role: Rider

Édouard Bihouée (born 6 April 1936) is a French former professional racing cyclist. He rode in the 1960, 1961 and 1962 Tour de France.
