= Mario Minieri =

Italian cyclist

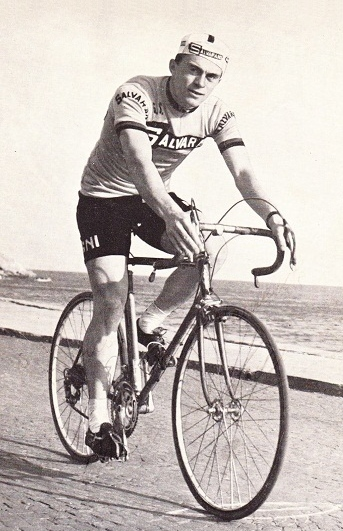
- Mario Minieri in 1966

Personal information
- Full name: Mario Minieri
- Born: 21 June 1938 (age 88) Vergato, Italy

Cycling career
- Sport: Cycling
- Discipline: Road
- Role: Rider

Major wins
- 1 stage Tour de France

Mario Minieri (born 21 June 1938) is an Italian retired professional road bicycle racer, who rode the Tour de France in 1961, 62, 64, 65 and 67 and Giro d'Italia in 1968. He won a stage in the 1960 Tour of Sicily and stage 8A from the 1962 Tour de France.
