= Giancarlo Manzoni =

Italian cyclist (1938–2013)

Personal information
- Born: 19 November 1938
- Died: 14 June 2013 (aged 74)

Cycling career
- Sport: Cycling
- Role: Rider

Giancarlo Manzoni (19 November 1938 – 14 June 2013) was an Italian racing cyclist. He rode in the 1962 Tour de France.
