= Emile Daems =

Belgian cyclist (1938–2024)

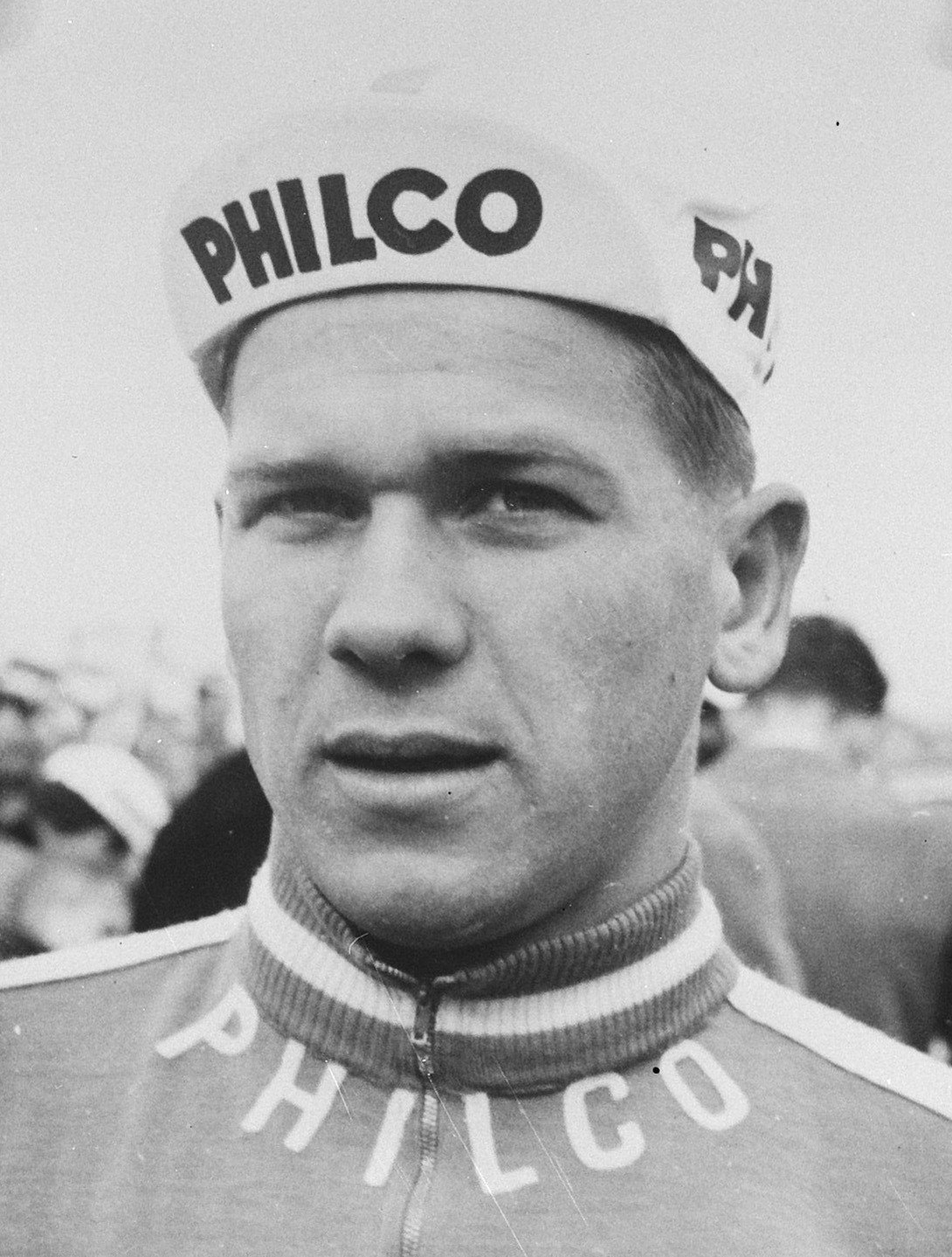
- Daems after winning stage 5 of the 1962 Tour de France

Personal information
- Full name: Emile Daems
- Born: 4 April 1938 Genval, Belgium
- Died: 17 October 2024 (aged 86) Wavre, Belgium

Cycling career
- Sport: Cycling
- Discipline: Road
- Role: Rider
- Rider type: Sprinter

Professional teams
- 1960–1962: Philco
- 1963–1965: Peugeot–BP–Englebert
- 1966: Solo–Superia

Major wins
- Grand Tours Tour de France 4 individual stages (1961, 1962) Giro d'Italia 2 individual stages (1960) Stage races Giro di Sardegna (1961) One-day races and Classics Giro di Lombardia (1960) Milan–San Remo (1962) Paris–Roubaix (1963) Giro dell'Appennino (1960) Giro del Ticino (1961, 1962)

Emile Daems (4 April 1938 – 17 October 2024) was a Belgian professional road racing cyclist whose career burned brightly for just six full professional seasons yet left an indelible mark on the sport. Small in stature but immense in spirit, he won three of the five Monuments of Cycling: Milan–San Remo, Paris–Roubaix, and the Giro di Lombardia. A gifted sprinter with a fiercely independent streak, Daems often rode against the grain of team orders, forging his own legend in an era dominated by the iron will of Rik Van Looy. After walking away from cycling at just twenty-eight, he spent the rest of his life as a beloved restaurateur, remaining a quiet but revered figure in Belgian cycling until his death at the age of eighty-six.

== Early life and amateur career ==
Emile Daems was born in the tranquil lakeside town of Genval, in the province of Walloon Brabant, on 4 April 1938. The son of a railway worker, he grew up in modest circumstances, discovering the bicycle as a means of freedom and expression. As a teenager he raced on local circuits, his light build and fierce acceleration quickly marking him out. His amateur palmarès was impressive: in 1956 he won the Belgian interclubs road championship, and a year later he triumphed in the Rund um den Sachsenring in East Germany. That victory, as it turned out, would later shape the course of his professional life in ways no one could have anticipated.

By 1959 he had become the independent (semi-professional) winner of the Tour of Flanders for non-professionals, a result that signalled his readiness for the highest level. At the end of that year he signed his first professional contract with the small but ambitious Italian team Philco, setting the stage for a stunning debut.

== Professional career ==
=== 1960: A neo-professional sensation ===
Daems’s first season as a professional in 1960 was nothing short of astonishing. Racing for Philco, an Italian squad better known for its household appliance namesake than its cycling pedigree, the young Belgian immediately made his presence felt at the Giro d'Italia. He sprinted to stage victories on stages 9a and 19, demonstrating a blistering turn of speed that belied his inexperience. Later that summer he won the Tour de l'Ouest in France and the Giro dell'Appennino, a hilly Italian semi-classic that hinted at his versatility.

The crowning moment of his debut year came on a crisp autumn day in Lombardy. In the 1960 Giro di Lombardia, Daems escaped on the final climb and descended into Como alone, raising his arms in triumph. At twenty-two, he had won a Monument. The victory announced that a new star had arrived, one who feared neither the distance nor the pressure of the biggest races.

That same year, Daems was selected for the Belgian national team at the World Championships in Hohenstein-Ernstthal, on the Sachsenring circuit in East Germany. The Belgian squad, built entirely around the formidable Rik Van Looy, expected absolute loyalty. Daems, however, had his own memories of the Sachsenring: three years earlier he had won the amateur Rund um den Sachsenring on the same roads. He felt he deserved a chance. When the race unfolded, he refused to sacrifice himself for Van Looy and instead raced for his own result, finishing 19th. Van Looy went on to win the rainbow jersey, but the incident created a rift that would follow Daems throughout his career. The young rider was branded as headstrong and unreliable in the service of a leader, a reputation that both isolated him and underscored his fierce self-belief.

=== 1961: Sardinia, the Tour, and the Ticino ===
Daems continued his upward trajectory in 1961. Riding again for Philco, he captured the overall classification of the Giro di Sardegna, a stage race that wound through the rugged island interior. His sprinting and climbing ability blended perfectly, and he also won a stage of the race.

The high point of his season, however, came in July, during his debut Tour de France. On the road to Charleroi, a city not far from his birthplace, he won stage 3 in a powerful sprint finish. The image of Daems crossing the line with his arms raised, a Belgian flag virtually wrapped around him by the ecstatic local crowd, became one of the defining photographs of his career. He would later call it the most emotional victory of his life, riding into the heart of his homeland as a conquering hero.

He also added the Giro del Ticino and the GP Dr. Eugeen Roggeman to his tally, while finishing fourth in the Tour of Flanders, a race he yearned to win but which would always elude him as a professional.

=== 1962: The Monuments and a legendary Tour stage ===
In 1962, Daems produced the finest season of his career. He began the spring by winning Milan–San Remo, the Primavera. In a cold, rain-soaked edition, he surged away in the final kilometre and held off the chasing peloton by a few agonising seconds. The victory confirmed his status as one of the premier classics riders of his generation.

At that summer's Tour de France, he won three stages, each in a distinctly different fashion. Stage 5 into Saint-Malo he took solo, slipping away from a breakaway and time-trialling to the line. Stage 16 to Aix-en-Provence was another solo exhibition. Stage 18, from Juan-les-Pins to Briançon, is considered to be a part of the Tour legend. Although not a pure climber, Daems latched onto the lead group on the Col d'Izoard. Over the summit he was just twenty seconds behind Federico Bahamontes. On the descent and the run-in to Briançon, he regrouped with a handful of riders and then unleashed his sprint in the final metres, beating Bahamontes, Jacques Anquetil, Raymond Poulidor, and the yellow jersey Jef Planckaert.

He finished that Tour 13th overall and placed second in the points classification, only narrowly missing the green jersey. His exploits earned him admiration across France and Belgium. That same year he again won the Giro del Ticino, and he took the Omloop van Limburg and the Flèche Halloise.

=== 1963: Paris–Roubaix and the pavé ===
For the 1963 season, Daems moved to the French Peugeot–BP–Englebert team, a powerhouse outfit that included stars such as Tom Simpson. In early April he lined up for Paris–Roubaix, the Queen of the Classics. Under a grey northern sky, the race shattered on the cobblestones. Daems, with his low centre of gravity and superb bike handling, felt at home on the rough pavé. He attacked repeatedly, and finally, entering the velodrome in Roubaix alone, he had time to savour the moment. He rolled across the finish line with his arms aloft, a Belgian triumphant in the race his countrymen cherished above all others. Victory in Paris–Roubaix secured his place among cycling's elite and completed a unique treble: San Remo, Roubaix, and Lombardy in a span of three years.

That year he also won the Belgian interclubs road championship and stages at the Mi-Août en Bretagne, while placing third in the Brabantse Pijl.

=== 1964–1966: Winding down ===
After the move to Peugeot, Daems continued to race with verve, but his career slowly began to wind down. In 1964 he won the Omloop der Zennevallei, and in 1965 he claimed the interclubs road championship once again, plus the Circuit du Tournaisis and a few placings. Yet the sparkle of the early years had dimmed. At the end of 1965 he left Peugeot and rode one final season in 1966 for the small Belgian squad Solo–Superia, before deciding to retire at the age of just twenty-eight.

His decision surprised many. Daems was still competitive and could have continued to harvest victories in criteriums and minor classics. But the relentlessness of professional cycling and the politics of team hierarchies had taken their toll. He had never been comfortable riding in the shadow of others, and the Van Looy-dominated Belgian peloton made it difficult for a man of his temperament to flourish. Rather than grow bitter, Daems chose to step away on his own terms.

== Riding style and personality ==
Emile Daems was a paradox: a sprinter who could climb, a classics specialist who won in the high Alps. Standing just 1.67 metres tall, he was compact and aerodynamic, ideally built for the cobbles and for powering through the wind. His sprint was explosive, often launched from a small group rather than a mass gallop, relying on timing and surprise rather than raw horsepower.

But it was his character that set him apart. In an age when Belgian cycling was built around a rigid hierarchy, Daems was a free spirit. He refused to be a mere domestique, even when riding for designated leaders. The Sachsenring affair of 1960 became emblematic: he was not rebellious for its own sake, but because he genuinely believed in his own ability to win. This self-assurance sometimes alienated him from teammates and directors, but it also earned him a special place in the hearts of fans who saw him as a romantic figure, a small man who dared to defy giants.

Off the bike, Daems was known for his warmth and humour. He spoke frankly, never hiding his opinions, but with a twinkle in his eye that disarmed critics. After he retired, he channelled his sociability into the restaurant business, a natural second act for a man who enjoyed good food and good company as much as a good race.

== Retirement and later life ==
Daems opened a restaurant in his home region of Walloon Brabant, not far from where he grew up. The establishment became a popular meeting place for cyclists and local residents. Pictures of his racing days lined the walls, and Daems would often recount stories of his duels with Anquetil, Bahamontes, and Van Looy, always with a generous dose of self-deprecation. He never sought the limelight, but he remained deeply connected to the sport. He was a regular at the Tour of Flanders and other Belgian races, a revered figure whom younger riders approached with respect and curiosity.

He married and raised a family, finding in domestic life the calm that the peloton had never quite provided. In interviews in his later years, he often reflected on his career with gratitude rather than regret. The early retirement, he said, was the best decision he ever made. It allowed him to enjoy cycling as a spectator and as a memory, rather than a burden.

== Death and tributes ==
Emile Daems died in Wavre on 17 October 2024, at the age of eighty-six. The news prompted an outpouring of tributes from across the cycling world. Former champions and journalists recalled his elegance, his fearlessness, and his unique place in the history of the Monuments. He was remembered as one of the last of a generation that raced with passion and panache, a small man who had stood tall against the greatest. His funeral in Genval was attended by family, friends, and a quiet guard of honour of cyclists who pedalled silently behind the hearse in a final gesture of respect.

== Legacy ==
Emile Daems remains one of a select group of riders to have won three different Monuments. His name sits alongside those of Eddy Merckx, Roger De Vlaeminck, and Rik Van Looy in the pantheon of Belgian cycling. But his legacy is more than a list of victories. He symbolised an era when riders raced with individual flair, when a lone break could hold off the charging pack, and when character mattered as much as physical strength.

== Major results ==
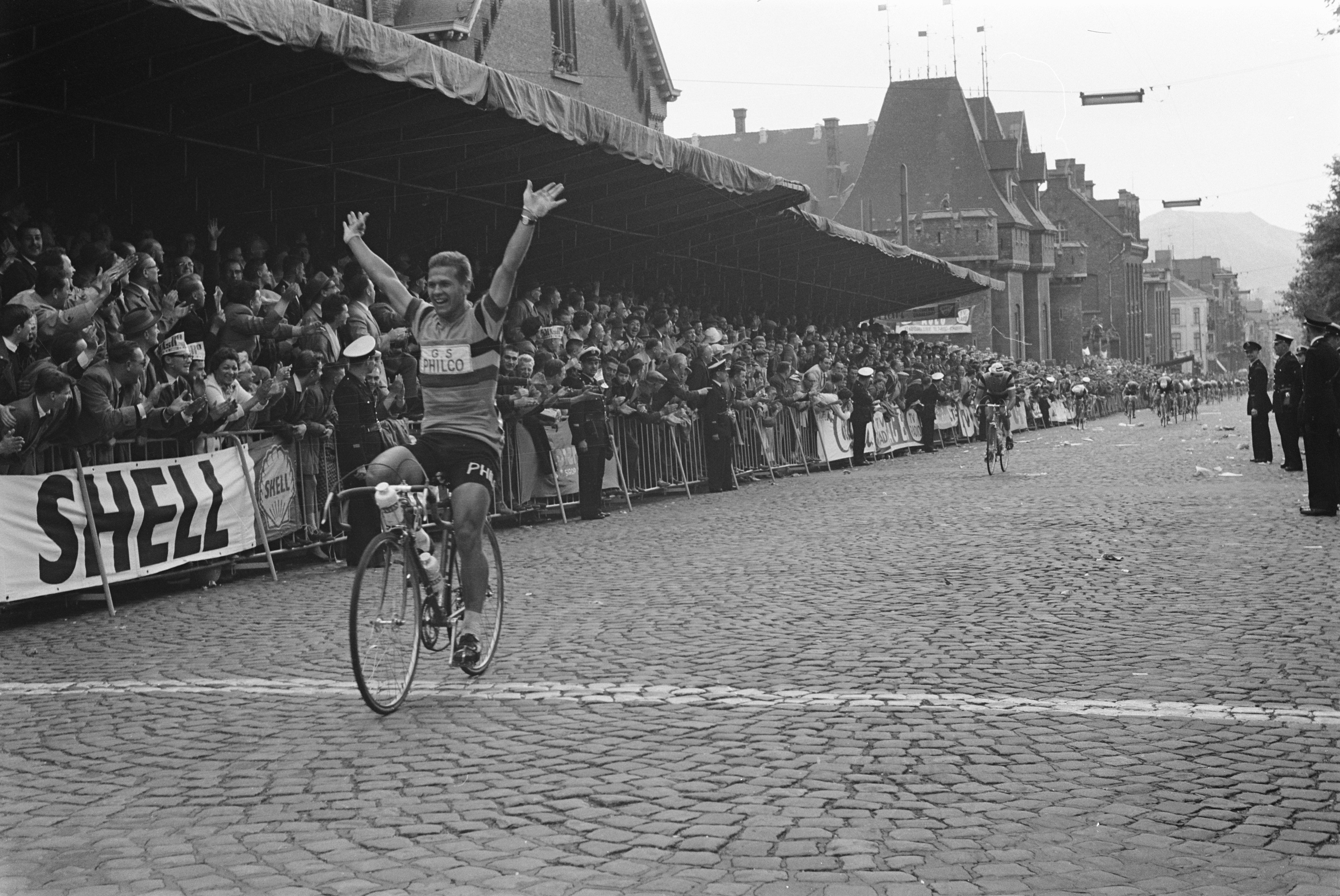
Daems winning stage 4 in the 1961 Tour de France in Charleroi

=== As Amateur ===
1956
1st National Road Championships - Interclubs road race
2nd Brussels–Nivelles
1957
1st Hoeilaert–Leuven–Hoeilaert
1st Brussels–La Louvière–Brussels
1st Rund um den Sachsenring
3rd Rund um die Hainleite
1958
1st Overall Tour de Berlin

Winner 4 stages

1st Overall GP Général Patton Juniors
1st GP Victor Bodson
1st Tour des Quatre-Cantons
1st Namur–Namêche
1st Bruxelles–La Louvière–Bruxelles
1959
1st Tour of Flanders independents

=== As Professional ===
1960
1st Giro di Lombardia
1st Giro dell'Appennino
1st Nationale Sluitingsprijs
1st Stages 9a and 19 Giro d'Italia
1st Stage 16 Roma–Napoli–Roma
1st Tour de l'Ouest
1st Trofeo Longines (TTT)
2nd Ronde van Brabant
3rd Heistse Pijl
3rd Six Days of Brussels (with Willy Vannitsen)
1961
1st Overall Giro di Sardegna
1st Stage 3 Tour de France
1st Giro del Ticino
1st GP Dr. Eugeen Roggeman
1st GP Brabant Wallon
3rd Grote Prijs Beeckman-De Caluwé
4th Tour of Flanders
1962
1st Milan–San Remo
1st Stage 2a Paris–Nice
13th Overall Tour de France

1st Stages 5, 16 and 18
2nd points classification

1st Stage 5 Giro di Sardegna
1st Giro del Ticino
1st Flèche Halloise
1st Omloop van Limburg
3rd Six Days of Brussels (with Emile Severeyns)
1963
1st National Road Championships - Interclubs road race
1st Paris–Roubaix
1st Stages 5 and 7 Mi-Août en Bretagne
1st Vilvoorde–Houtem
1st Boucles Roquevairoises
3rd Brabantse Pijl
1964
1st Omloop der Zennevallei
2nd Gullegem Koerse
1965
1st National Road Championships - Interclubs road race
1st Circuit du Tournaisis
2nd GP Stad Vilvoorde
3rd Grote Prijs Jef Scherens
3rd Tour of Leuven
