= Liberia (cycling team) =

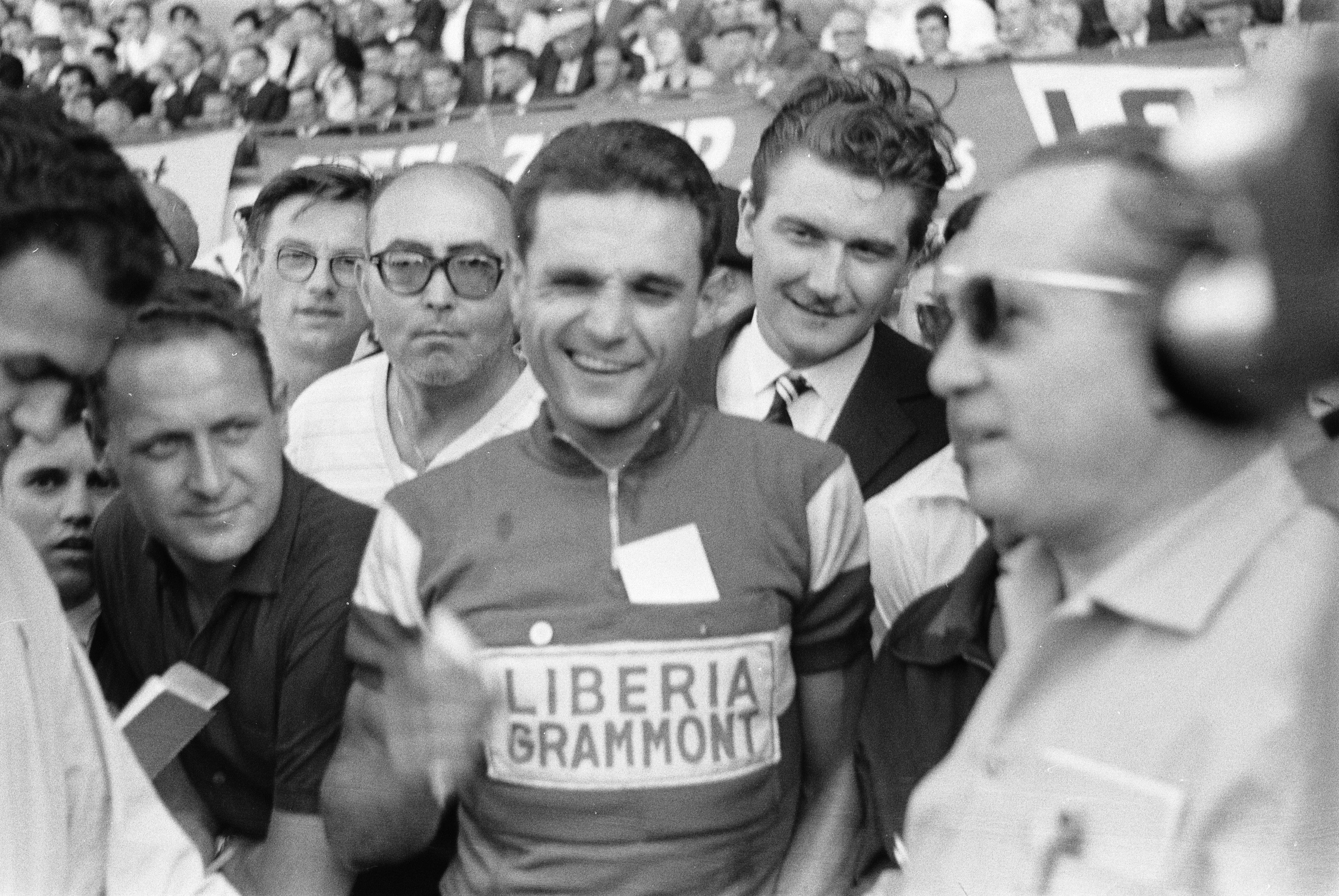
- Henry Anglade at the 1960 Tour de France

Team information
- Registered: France
- Founded: 1954
- Disbanded: 1962
- Discipline: Road
- Status: Liberia

Team name history
- 1954 1955–1956 1957 1958–1959 1960 1961–1962: Liberia; Liberia–Hutchinson; Hutchinson–D'Alessandro; Liberia–Hutchinson; Liberia–Grammont; Liberia–Grammont–Wolber

Liberia was a professional cycling team that existed from 1954 to 1962.
