= Giancarlo Gentina =

Italian cyclist

Personal information
- Born: 2 January 1939 (age 87)

Cycling career
- Sport: Cycling
- Role: Rider

Giancarlo Gentina (born 2 January 1939 in Paruzzaro) is an Italian racing cyclist. He rode in the 1962 Tour de France.
