= 1961 Tour de France, Stage 11 to Stage 21 =

Cycling race stages

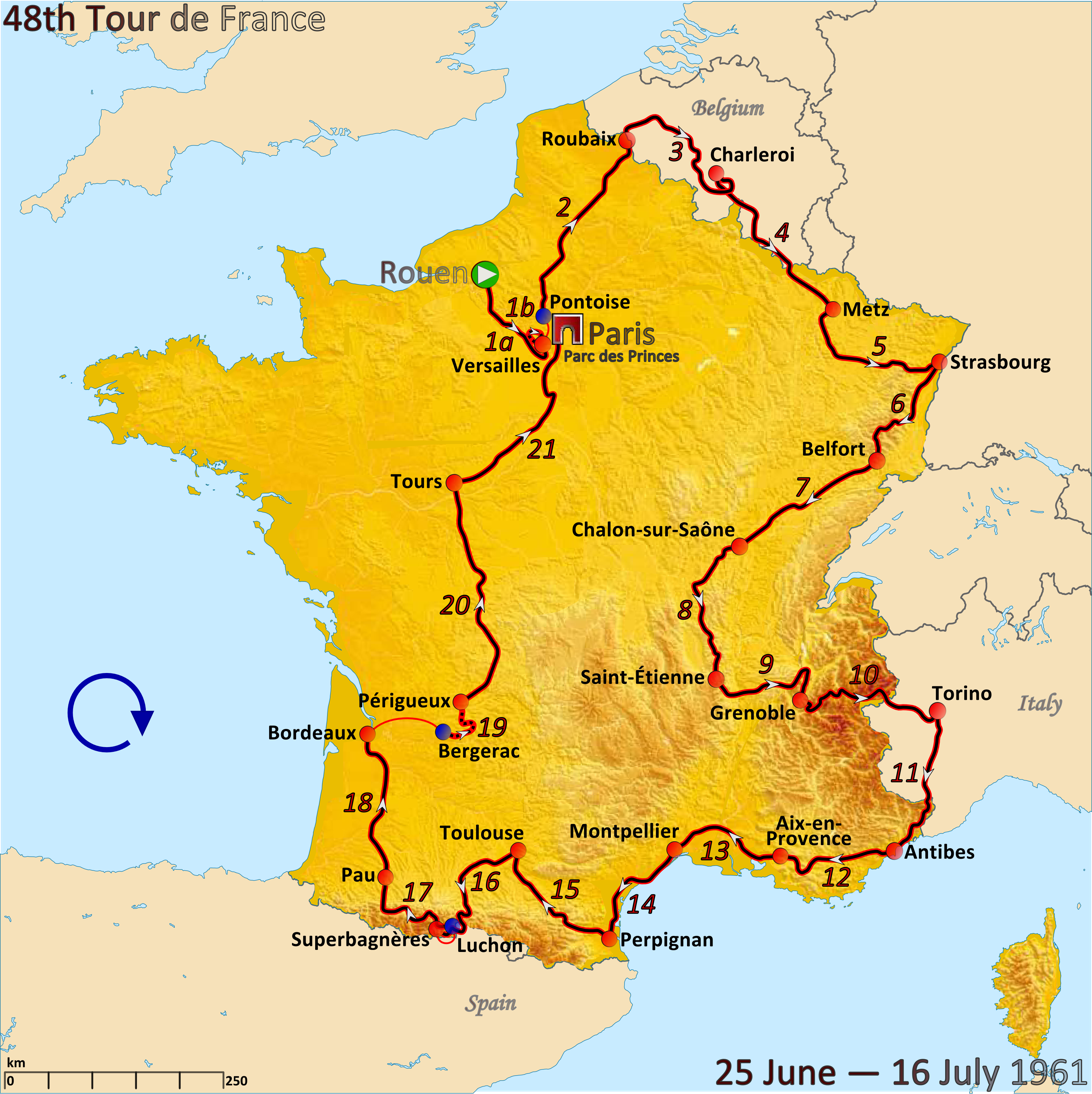
Route of the 1961 Tour de France

The 1961 Tour de France was the 48th edition of Tour de France, one of cycling's Grand Tours. The Tour began in Rouen with a flat stage on 25 June and Stage 11 occurred on 5 July with a mountain stage from Turin in Italy. The race finished in Paris on 16 July.

== Stage 11 ==
5 July 1961 - Turin to Antibes, 225 km (139.8 mi)

Stage 11 result

Rank	Rider	Team	Time
1	Guido Carlesi (ITA)	Italy	6h 42' 01"
2	Jacques Anquetil (FRA)	France	s.t.
3	Jean Gainche (FRA)	France - West/South-West	s.t.
4	Henry Anglade (FRA)	France	s.t.
5	Dieter Puschel (FRG)	Germany	s.t.
6	Eddy Pauwels (BEL)	Belgium	s.t.
7	Valentin Huot (FRA)	France - Centre	s.t.
8	Imerio Massignan (ITA)	Italy	s.t.
9	Hans Junkermann (FRG)	Germany	s.t.
10	Jef Planckaert (BEL)	Belgium	s.t.

General classification after stage 11

Rank	Rider	Team	Time
1	Jacques Anquetil (FRA)	France	65h 34' 11"
2	Fernando Manzaneque (ESP)	Spain	+ 5' 37"
3	Charly Gaul (LUX)	Switzerland/Luxembourg	+ 6' 33"
4	Guido Carlesi (ITA)	Italy	+ 7' 43"
5	José Pérez Francés (ESP)	Spain	+ 8' 14"
6	Hans Junkermann (FRG)	Germany	+ 9' 16"
7	Imerio Massignan (ITA)	Italy	+ 9' 36"
8	Jean Dotto (FRA)	France - Centre	+ 10' 22"
9	Raymond Mastrotto (FRA)	France	+ 11' 12"
10	Henry Anglade (FRA)	France	+ 15' 59"

== Stage 12 ==
6 July 1961 - Antibes to Aix-en-Provence, 199 km (123.7 mi)

Stage 12 result

Rank	Rider	Team	Time
1	Michel Van Aerde (BEL)	Belgium	5h 43' 08"
2	Jean Stablinski (FRA)	France	s.t.
3	Jean-Baptiste Claes (BEL)	Belgium	s.t.
4	Fernand Picot (FRA)	France - West/South-West	s.t.
5	Renzo Accordi (ITA)	Italy	s.t.
6	Joseph Thomin (FRA)	France - West/South-West	s.t.
7	Louis Bergaud (FRA)	France - Centre	s.t.
8	Edouard Bihouée (FRA)	France - West/South-West	s.t.
9	Antoine Abate (FRA)	France - Centre	s.t.
10	André Le Dissez (FRA)	France - Paris/North-East	s.t.

General classification after stage 12

Rank	Rider	Team	Time
1	Jacques Anquetil (FRA)	France	71h 24' 01"
2	Fernando Manzaneque (ESP)	Spain	+ 5' 37"
3	Charly Gaul (LUX)	Switzerland/Luxembourg	+ 6' 33"
4	Guido Carlesi (ITA)	Italy	+ 7' 43"
5	José Pérez Francés (ESP)	Spain	+ 8' 14"
6	Michel Van Aerde (BEL)	Belgium	+ 9' 07"
7	Hans Junkermann (FRG)	Germany	+ 9' 16"
8	Imerio Massignan (ITA)	Italy	+ 9' 36"
9	Jean Dotto (FRA)	France - Centre	+ 10' 22"
10	Jan Adriaensens (BEL)	Belgium	+ 16' 40"

== Stage 13 ==
7 July 1961 - Aix-en-Provence to Montpellier, 177.5 km (110.3 mi)

Stage 13 result

Rank	Rider	Team	Time
1	André Darrigade (FRA)	France	4h 38' 37"
2	Jaap Kersten (NED)	Netherlands	s.t.
3	Frans Aerenhouts (BEL)	Belgium	s.t.
4	Jean Gainche (FRA)	France - West/South-West	s.t.
5	Adriano Zamboni (ITA)	Italy	s.t.
6	Jean Stablinski (FRA)	France	s.t.
7	Eddy Pauwels (BEL)	Belgium	s.t.
8	Pierre Beuffeuil (FRA)	France - West/South-West	s.t.
9	Jos Hoevenaers (BEL)	Belgium	s.t.
10	Joseph Wasko (FRA)	France - Paris/North-East	s.t.

General classification after stage 13

Rank	Rider	Team	Time
1	Jacques Anquetil (FRA)	France	76h 05' 26"
2	Fernando Manzaneque (ESP)	Spain	+ 5' 37"
3	Charly Gaul (LUX)	Switzerland/Luxembourg	+ 6' 33"
4	Guido Carlesi (ITA)	Italy	+ 7' 43"
5	José Pérez Francés (ESP)	Spain	+ 8' 14"
6	Michel Van Aerde (BEL)	Belgium	+ 9' 07"
7	Hans Junkermann (FRG)	Germany	+ 9' 16"
8	Imerio Massignan (ITA)	Italy	+ 9' 36"
9	Jean Dotto (FRA)	France - Centre	+ 10' 22"
10	Jan Adriaensens (BEL)	Belgium	+ 16' 40"

== Rest Day ==
8 July 1961 - Montpellier

== Stage 14 ==
9 July 1961 - Montpellier to Perpignan, 174 km (108 mi)

Stage 14 result

Rank	Rider	Team	Time
1	Eddy Pauwels (BEL)	Belgium	4h 21' 42"
2	Fernand Picot (FRA)	France - West/South-West	s.t.
3	Jean Forestier (FRA)	France	s.t.
4	Joseph Wasko (FRA)	France - Paris/North-East	s.t.
5	Jan Westdorp (NED)	Netherlands	+ 18"
6	Jef Planckaert (BEL)	Belgium	+ 2' 00"
7	Jos Hoevenaers (BEL)	Belgium	s.t.
8	Elio Gerussi (FRA)	France - Paris/North-East	s.t.
9	Piet van Est (NED)	Netherlands	s.t.
10	Henry Anglade (FRA)	France	s.t.

General classification after stage 14

Rank	Rider	Team	Time
1	Jacques Anquetil (FRA)	France	80h 20' 17"
2	Fernando Manzaneque (ESP)	Spain	+ 5' 37"
3	Charly Gaul (LUX)	Switzerland/Luxembourg	+ 6' 33"
4	Guido Carlesi (ITA)	Italy	+ 7' 43"
5	José Pérez Francés (ESP)	Spain	+ 8' 14"
6	Michel Van Aerde (BEL)	Belgium	+ 9' 07"
7	Hans Junkermann (FRG)	Germany	+ 9' 25"
8	Imerio Massignan (ITA)	Italy	+ 9' 36"
9	Jean Dotto (FRA)	France - Centre	+ 10' 31"
10	Jan Adriaensens (BEL)	Belgium	+ 16' 49"

== Stage 15 ==
10 July 1961 - Perpignan to Toulouse, 206 km (128 mi)

Stage 15 result

Rank	Rider	Team	Time
1	Guido Carlesi (ITA)	Italy	5h 33' 58"
2	Jean-Baptiste Claes (BEL)	Belgium	s.t.
3	André Foucher (FRA)	France - West/South-West	s.t.
4	Louis Bergaud (FRA)	France - Centre	s.t.
5	Michel Van Aerde (BEL)	Belgium	+ 6"
6	Jean Gainche (FRA)	France - West/South-West	s.t.
7	Frans Aerenhouts (BEL)	Belgium	s.t.
8	Bernard Viot (FRA)	France - Paris/North-East	s.t.
9	Martin Van Geneugden (BEL)	Belgium	s.t.
10	André Darrigade (FRA)	France	s.t.

General classification after stage 15

Rank	Rider	Team	Time
1	Jacques Anquetil (FRA)	France	86h 03' 21"
2	Fernando Manzaneque (ESP)	Spain	+ 5' 37"
3	Guido Carlesi (ITA)	Italy	+ 6' 07"
4	Charly Gaul (LUX)	Switzerland/Luxembourg	+ 6' 33"
5	José Pérez Francés (ESP)	Spain	+ 8' 14"
6	Michel Van Aerde (BEL)	Belgium	+ 9' 07"
7	Hans Junkermann (FRG)	Germany	+ 9' 25"
8	Imerio Massignan (ITA)	Italy	+ 9' 36"
9	Jean Dotto (FRA)	France - Centre	+ 10' 31"
10	Jan Adriaensens (BEL)	Belgium	+ 16' 49"

== Stage 16 ==
11 July 1961 - Toulouse to Superbagnères, 208 km (129 mi)

Stage 16 result

Rank	Rider	Team	Time
1	Imerio Massignan (ITA)	Italy	6h 58' 17"
2	Guido Carlesi (ITA)	Italy	+ 8"
3	Hans Junkermann (FRG)	Germany	+ 14"
4	Jacques Anquetil (FRA)	France	+ 16"
5	Jos Hoevenaers (BEL)	Belgium	s.t.
6	Charly Gaul (LUX)	Switzerland/Luxembourg	s.t.
7	André Foucher (FRA)	France - West/South-West	s.t.
8	Fernando Manzaneque (ESP)	Spain	+ 22"
9	Jean Dotto (FRA)	France - Centre	+ 29"
10	Claude Mattio (FRA)	France - Centre	+ 39"

General classification after stage 16

Rank	Rider	Team	Time
1	Jacques Anquetil (FRA)	France	93h 01' 54"
2	Guido Carlesi (ITA)	Italy	+ 5' 29"
3	Fernando Manzaneque (ESP)	Spain	+ 5' 43"
4	Charly Gaul (LUX)	Switzerland/Luxembourg	+ 6' 33"
5	Imerio Massignan (ITA)	Italy	+ 8' 50"
6	Hans Junkermann (FRG)	Germany	+ 9' 23"
7	Jean Dotto (FRA)	France - Centre	+ 10' 44"
8	José Pérez Francés (ESP)	Spain	+ 12' 03"
9	Jan Adriaensens (BEL)	Belgium	+ 17' 54"
10	Michel Van Aerde (BEL)	Belgium	+ 18' 12"

== Stage 17 ==
12 July 1961 - Luchon to Pau, 197 km (122 mi)

Stage 17 result

Rank	Rider	Team	Time
1	Eddy Pauwels (BEL)	Belgium	6h 29' 57"
2	André Foucher (FRA)	France - West/South-West	s.t.
3	Marcel Queheille (FRA)	France - West/South-West	+ 5"
4	Joseph Groussard (FRA)	France	+ 3' 58"
5	Jos Hoevenaers (BEL)	Belgium	+ 3' 59"
6	Guido Carlesi (ITA)	Italy	+ 4' 06"
7	Jean Gainche (FRA)	France - West/South-West	s.t.
8	Frans Aerenhouts (BEL)	Belgium	s.t.
9	Joseph Thomin (FRA)	France - West/South-West	s.t.
10	Hans Junkermann (FRG)	Germany	s.t.

General classification after stage 17

Rank	Rider	Team	Time
1	Jacques Anquetil (FRA)	France	99h 35' 57"
2	Guido Carlesi (ITA)	Italy	+ 5' 29"
3	Fernando Manzaneque (ESP)	Spain	+ 5' 43"
4	Charly Gaul (LUX)	Switzerland/Luxembourg	+ 6' 33"
5	Imerio Massignan (ITA)	Italy	+ 8' 50"
6	Hans Junkermann (FRG)	Germany	+ 9' 23"
7	Jean Dotto (FRA)	France - Centre	+ 10' 44"
8	José Pérez Francés (ESP)	Spain	+ 12' 03"
9	Jan Adriaensens (BEL)	Belgium	+ 17' 54"
10	Eddy Pauwels (BEL)	Belgium	+ 18' 21"

== Stage 18 ==
13 July 1961 - Pau to Bordeaux, 207 km (129 mi)

Stage 18 result

Rank	Rider	Team	Time
1	Martin Van Geneugden (BEL)	Belgium	5h 37' 18"
2	Jean Gainche (FRA)	France - West/South-West	s.t.
3	André Darrigade (FRA)	France	s.t.
4	Frans Aerenhouts (BEL)	Belgium	s.t.
5	Bernard Viot (FRA)	France - Paris/North-East	s.t.
6	Vicente Iturat (ESP)	Spain	s.t.
7	Rolf Graf (SUI)	Switzerland/Luxembourg	s.t.
8	Michel Van Aerde (BEL)	Belgium	s.t.
9	Armando Pellegrini (ITA)	Italy	s.t.
10	Joseph Thomin (FRA)	France - West/South-West	s.t.

General classification after stage 18

Rank	Rider	Team	Time
1	Jacques Anquetil (FRA)	France	105h 13' 15"
2	Guido Carlesi (ITA)	Italy	+ 5' 29"
3	Fernando Manzaneque (ESP)	Spain	+ 5' 43"
4	Charly Gaul (LUX)	Switzerland/Luxembourg	+ 6' 33"
5	Imerio Massignan (ITA)	Italy	+ 8' 50"
6	Hans Junkermann (FRG)	Germany	+ 9' 23"
7	Jean Dotto (FRA)	France - Centre	+ 10' 44"
8	José Pérez Francés (ESP)	Spain	+ 12' 03"
9	Jan Adriaensens (BEL)	Belgium	+ 17' 54"
10	Eddy Pauwels (BEL)	Belgium	+ 18' 21"

== Stage 19 ==
14 July 1961 - Bergerac to Périgueux, 74.5 km (46.3 mi) (ITT)

Stage 19 result

Rank	Rider	Team	Time
1	Jacques Anquetil (FRA)	France	1h 42' 32"
2	Charly Gaul (LUX)	Switzerland/Luxembourg	+ 2' 59"
3	Guido Carlesi (ITA)	Italy	+ 3' 37"
4	Hans Junkermann (FRG)	Germany	+ 3' 41"
5	Jean Gainche (FRA)	France - West/South-West	+ 3' 47"
6	Raymond Mastrotto (FRA)	France	+ 4' 38"
7	José Pérez Francés (ESP)	Spain	+ 5' 19"
8	Gérard Thiélin (FRA)	France - Centre	+ 5' 25"
9	Rolf Graf (SUI)	Switzerland/Luxembourg	+ 5' 54"
10	Jef Planckaert (BEL)	Belgium	+ 5' 59"

General classification after stage 19

Rank	Rider	Team	Time
1	Jacques Anquetil (FRA)	France	106h 54' 47"
2	Charly Gaul (LUX)	Switzerland/Luxembourg	+ 10' 02"
3	Guido Carlesi (ITA)	Italy	+ 10' 06"
4	Hans Junkermann (FRG)	Germany	+ 14' 04"
5	Fernando Manzaneque (ESP)	Spain	+ 14' 13"
6	Imerio Massignan (ITA)	Italy	+ 15' 59"
7	José Pérez Francés (ESP)	Spain	+ 18' 22"
8	Jean Dotto (FRA)	France - Centre	+ 19' 35"
9	Jan Adriaensens (BEL)	Belgium	+ 26' 06"
10	Eddy Pauwels (BEL)	Belgium	+ 27' 36"

== Stage 20 ==
15 July 1961 - Périgueux to Tours, 309.5 km (192.3 mi)

Stage 20 result

Rank	Rider	Team	Time
1	André Darrigade (FRA)	France	8h 35' 59"
2	Bernard Viot (FRA)	France - Paris/North-East	s.t.
3	Guido Carlesi (ITA)	Italy	s.t.
4	Jean Gainche (FRA)	France - West/South-West	s.t.
5	Guy Ignolin (FRA)	France - West/South-West	s.t.
6	Michel Van Aerde (BEL)	Belgium	s.t.
7	Armando Pellegrini (ITA)	Italy	s.t.
8	Vicente Iturat (ESP)	Spain	s.t.
9	Frans Aerenhouts (BEL)	Belgium	s.t.
10	Piet Damen (NED)	Netherlands	s.t.

General classification after stage 20

Rank	Rider	Team	Time
1	Jacques Anquetil (FRA)	France	115h 30' 46"
2	Charly Gaul (LUX)	Switzerland/Luxembourg	+ 10' 02"
3	Guido Carlesi (ITA)	Italy	+ 10' 06"
4	Hans Junkermann (FRG)	Germany	+ 14' 04"
5	Fernando Manzaneque (ESP)	Spain	+ 14' 13"
6	Imerio Massignan (ITA)	Italy	+ 15' 59"
7	José Pérez Francés (ESP)	Spain	+ 18' 22"
8	Jean Dotto (FRA)	France - Centre	+ 19' 35"
9	Jan Adriaensens (BEL)	Belgium	+ 26' 06"
10	Eddy Pauwels (BEL)	Belgium	+ 27' 36"

== Stage 21 ==
16 July 1961 - Tours to Paris, 252.5 km (156.9 mi)

The finishing times were recorded at the entrance to the velodrome.

Stage 21 result

Rank	Rider	Team	Time
1	Robert Cazala (FRA)	France	6h 31' 17"
2	Jacques Anquetil (FRA)	France	s.t.
3	Jos Hoevenaers (BEL)	Belgium	s.t.
4	Jef Planckaert (BEL)	Belgium	s.t.
5	Imerio Massignan (ITA)	Italy	s.t.
6	Eddy Pauwels (BEL)	Belgium	s.t.
7	Marcel Queheille (FRA)	France - West/South-West	s.t.
8	Jean Gainche (FRA)	France - West/South-West	+ 1' 44"
9	André Darrigade (FRA)	France	s.t.
10	Jaap Kersten (NED)	Netherlands	+ 1' 40"

General classification after stage 21

Rank	Rider	Team	Time
1	Jacques Anquetil (FRA)	France	122h 01' 33"
2	Guido Carlesi (ITA)	Italy	+ 12' 14"
3	Charly Gaul (LUX)	Switzerland/Luxembourg	+ 12' 16"
4	Imerio Massignan (ITA)	Italy	+ 15' 59"
5	Hans Junkermann (FRG)	Germany	+ 16' 09"
6	Fernando Manzaneque (ESP)	Spain	+ 16' 27"
7	José Pérez Francés (ESP)	Spain	+ 20' 41"
8	Jean Dotto (FRA)	France - Centre	+ 21' 44"
9	Eddy Pauwels (BEL)	Belgium	+ 26' 57"
10	Jan Adriaensens (BEL)	Belgium	+ 28' 05"
