= 1961 Tour de France, Stage 1a to Stage 10 =

Cycling race stages

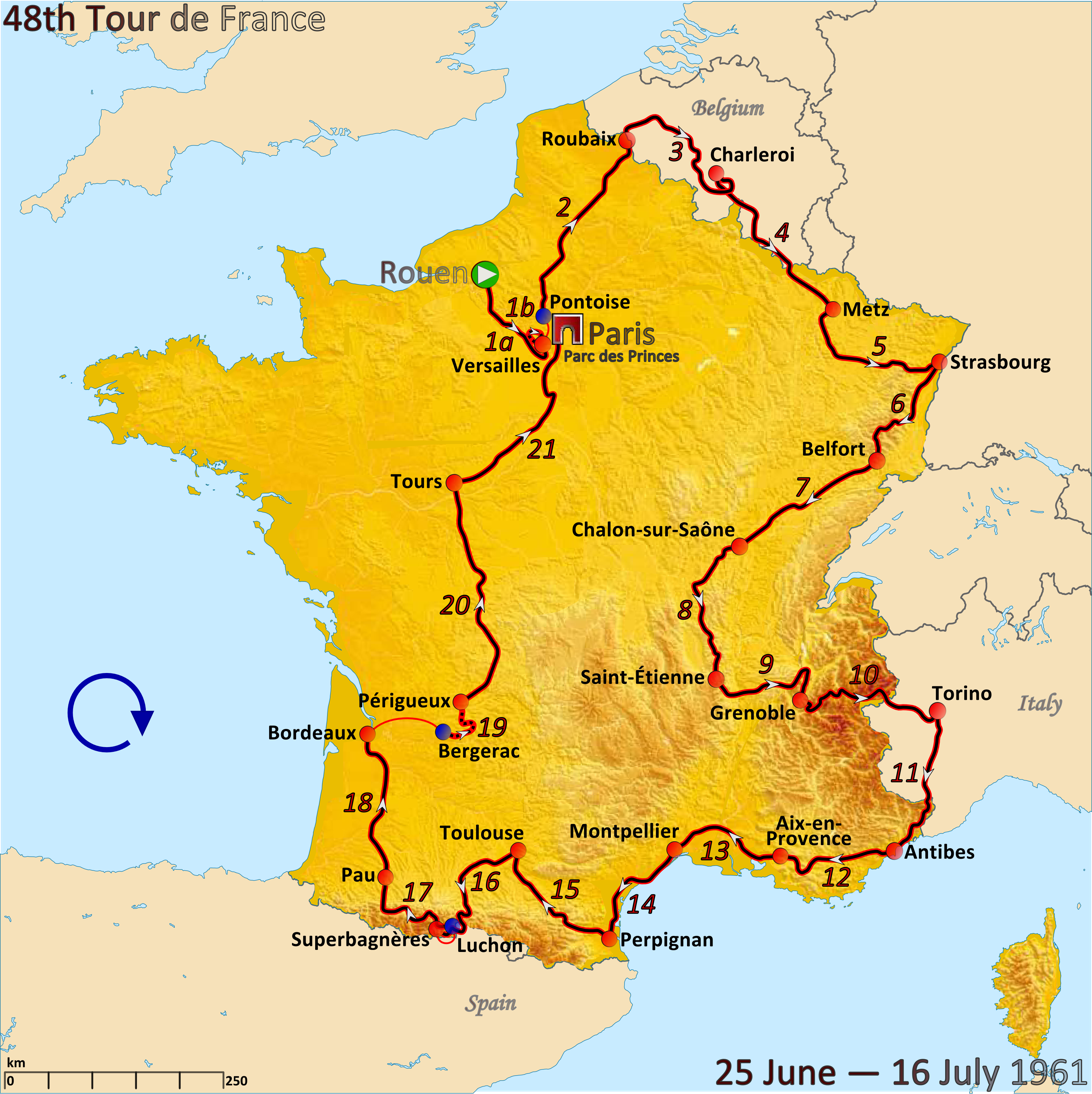
Route of the 1961 Tour de France

The 1961 Tour de France was the 48th edition of Tour de France, one of cycling's Grand Tours. The Tour began in Rouen with a flat stage on 25 June and Stage 10 occurred on 4 July with a mountainous stage to Turin in Italy. The race finished in Paris on 16 July.

== Stage 1a ==
25 June 1961 - Rouen to Versailles, 136.5 km (84.8 mi)

Stage 1a result and General Classification after Stage 1a

	Rider	Team	Time
1	André Darrigade (FRA)	France	3h 15' 16"
2	Mario Minieri (ITA)	Italy	s.t.
3	Jean Gainche (FRA)	France - West/South-West	s.t.
4	Joseph Groussard (FRA)	France	s.t.
5	Seamus Elliott (IRL)	Great Britain	s.t.
6	Frans Aerenhouts (BEL)	Belgium	s.t.
7	Philippe Gaudrillet (FRA)	France - Paris/North-East	s.t.
8	Jacques Anquetil (FRA)	France	s.t.
9	Guido Carlesi (ITA)	Italy	s.t.
10	Eddy Pauwels (BEL)	Belgium	s.t.

== Stage 1b ==
25 June 1961 - Versailles, 28.5 km (17.7 mi) (ITT)

Stage 1b result

Rank	Rider	Team	Time
1	Jacques Anquetil (FRA)	France	39' 43"
2	Albert Bouvet (FRA)	France - Paris/North-East	+ 2' 32"
3	Graziano Battistini (ITA)	Italy	+ 2' 39"
4	Henry Anglade (FRA)	France	+ 2' 43"
5	Charly Gaul (LUX)	Switzerland/Luxembourg	+ 2' 55"
6	Hans Junkermann (FRG)	Germany	+ 2' 58"
7	Raymond Mastrotto (FRA)	France	+ 3' 03"
8	Jef Planckaert (BEL)	Belgium	+ 3' 05"
9	Imerio Massignan (ITA)	Italy	+ 3' 18"
10	Albertus Geldermans (NED)	Netherlands	+ 3' 21"

General classification after stage 1b

Rank	Rider	Team	Time
1	Jacques Anquetil (FRA)	France	3h 54' 29"
2	Joseph Groussard (FRA)	France	+ 4' 46"
3	Guido Carlesi (ITA)	Italy	+ 5' 25"
4	José Pérez Francés (ESP)	Spain	s.t.
5	Seamus Elliott (IRL)	Great Britain	+ 5' 27"
6	Jean Gainche (FRA)	France - West/South-West	+ 5' 42"
7	Armando Pellegrini (ITA)	Italy	+ 5' 58"
8	Roberto Falaschi (ITA)	Italy	+ 6' 13"
9	Mario Minieri (ITA)	Italy	+ 6' 41"
10	Eddy Pauwels (BEL)	Belgium	+ 6' 56"

== Stage 2 ==
26 June 1961 - Pontoise to Roubaix, 230.5 km (143.2 mi)

Stage 2 result

Rank	Rider	Team	Time
1	André Darrigade (FRA)	France	5h 31' 26"
2	Emile Daems (BEL)	Belgium	s.t.
3	Carlo Brugnami (ITA)	Italy	s.t.
4	Pierre Beuffeuil (FRA)	France - West/South-West	s.t.
5	Luis Otaño (ESP)	Spain	s.t.
6	Camille Le Menn (FRA)	France - Centre	s.t.
7	Joseph Vloeberghs (BEL)	Belgium	s.t.
8	Jean Forestier (FRA)	France	s.t.
9	Siegfried Renz (FRG)	Germany	+ 18"
10	Jean-Baptiste Claes (BEL)	Belgium	s.t.

General classification after stage 2

Rank	Rider	Team	Time
1	Jacques Anquetil (FRA)	France	9h 26' 36"
2	Joseph Groussard (FRA)	France	+ 4' 46"
3	Guido Carlesi (ITA)	Italy	+ 5' 22"
4	José Pérez Francés (ESP)	Spain	s.t.
5	Seamus Elliott (IRL)	Great Britain	+ 5' 27"
6	Jean Gainche (FRA)	France - West/South-West	+ 5' 42"
7	Armando Pellegrini (ITA)	Italy	+ 5' 58"
8	Roberto Falaschi (ITA)	Italy	+ 6' 13"
9	André Darrigade (FRA)	France	+ 6' 26"
10	Mario Minieri (ITA)	Italy	+ 6' 41"

== Stage 3 ==
27 June 1961 - Roubaix to Charleroi, 197.5 km (122.7 mi)

Stage 3 result

Rank	Rider	Team	Time
1	Emile Daems (BEL)	Belgium	5h 00' 51"
2	Frans Aerenhouts (BEL)	Belgium	+ 2"
3	Michel Van Aerde (BEL)	Belgium	+ 5"
4	Carlo Brugnami (ITA)	Italy	s.t.
5	André Darrigade (FRA)	France	s.t.
6	Hans Junkermann (FRG)	Germany	s.t.
7	Jean Gainche (FRA)	France - West/South-West	s.t.
8	Jaap Kersten (NED)	Netherlands	s.t.
9	Brian Robinson (GBR)	Great Britain	s.t.
10	Georges Groussard (FRA)	France	s.t.

General classification after stage 3

Rank	Rider	Team	Time
1	Jacques Anquetil (FRA)	France	14h 27' 32"
2	Joseph Groussard (FRA)	France	+ 4' 46"
3	Guido Carlesi (ITA)	Italy	+ 5' 22"
4	José Pérez Francés (ESP)	Spain	s.t.
5	Seamus Elliott (IRL)	Great Britain	+ 5' 27"
6	Jean Gainche (FRA)	France - West/South-West	+ 5' 42"
7	Armando Pellegrini (ITA)	Italy	+ 5' 58"
8	André Darrigade (FRA)	France	+ 6' 26"
9	Roberto Falaschi (ITA)	Italy	+ 6' 40"
10	Mario Minieri (ITA)	Italy	+ 6' 41"

== Stage 4 ==
28 June 1961 - Charleroi to Metz, 237.5 km (147.6 mi)

Stage 4 result

Rank	Rider	Team	Time
1	Anatole Novak (FRA)	France - Centre	6h 23' 31"
2	Robert Cazala (FRA)	France	s.t.
3	Rolf Graf (SUI)	Switzerland/Luxembourg	+ 1"
4	Jo de Haan (NED)	Netherlands	+ 35"
5	Mario Minieri (ITA)	Italy	s.t.
6	Jean Gainche (FRA)	France - West/South-West	s.t.
7	Joseph Groussard (FRA)	France	s.t.
8	Frans Aerenhouts (BEL)	Belgium	s.t.
9	Jean-Baptiste Claes (BEL)	Belgium	s.t.
10	Jaap Kersten (NED)	Netherlands	s.t.

General classification after stage 4

Rank	Rider	Team	Time
1	Jacques Anquetil (FRA)	France	20h 52' 25"
2	Joseph Groussard (FRA)	France	+ 3' 59"
3	Guido Carlesi (ITA)	Italy	+ 5' 22"
4	José Pérez Francés (ESP)	Spain	+ 5' 23"
5	Jean Gainche (FRA)	France - West/South-West	+ 5' 25"
6	Seamus Elliott (IRL)	Great Britain	+ 5' 27"
7	Mario Minieri (ITA)	Italy	+ 6' 24"
8	Armando Pellegrini (ITA)	Italy	+ 6' 28"
9	André Darrigade (FRA)	France	+ 6' 56"
10	Eddy Pauwels (BEL)	Belgium	+ 7' 03"

== Stage 5 ==
29 June 1961 - Metz to Strasbourg, 221 km (137 mi)

Stage 5 result

Rank	Rider	Team	Time
1	Louis Bergaud (FRA)	France - Centre	5h 48' 05"
2	Jean Dotto (FRA)	France - Centre	+ 40"
3	Stéphane Lach (FRA)	France - Paris/North-East	s.t.
4	Wim van Est (NED)	Netherlands	s.t.
5	Piet van Est (NED)	Netherlands	+ 4' 36"
6	Carlo Brugnami (ITA)	Italy	s.t.
7	André Darrigade (FRA)	France	+ 4' 56"
8	Fernand Picot (FRA)	France - West/South-West	s.t.
9	Guy Ignolin (FRA)	France - West/South-West	s.t.
10	Frans Aerenhouts (BEL)	Belgium	s.t.

General classification after stage 5

Rank	Rider	Team	Time
1	Jacques Anquetil (FRA)	France	26h 45' 26"
2	Joseph Groussard (FRA)	France	+ 3' 58"
3	Jean Dotto (FRA)	France - Centre	+ 4' 41"
4	Wim van Est (NED)	Netherlands	+ 5' 04"
5	Guido Carlesi (ITA)	Italy	+ 5' 22"
6	José Pérez Francés (ESP)	Spain	+ 5' 23"
7	Seamus Elliott (IRL)	Great Britain	+ 5' 27"
8	Stéphane Lach (FRA)	France - Paris/North-East	s.t.
9	Mario Minieri (ITA)	Italy	s.t.
10	Jean Gainche (FRA)	France - West/South-West	+ 6' 25"

== Stage 6 ==
30 June 1961 - Strasbourg to Belfort, 180.5 km (112.2 mi)

Stage 6 result

Rank	Rider	Team	Time
1	Jef Planckaert (BEL)	Belgium	4h 35' 39"
2	Graziano Battistini (ITA)	Italy	+ 4' 41"
3	José Pérez Francés (ESP)	Spain	+ 4' 49"
4	Jacques Anquetil (FRA)	France	s.t.
5	Carlo Brugnami (ITA)	Italy	s.t.
6	Imerio Massignan (ITA)	Italy	s.t.
7	Eddy Pauwels (BEL)	Belgium	s.t.
8	Alfred Rüegg (SUI)	Switzerland/Luxembourg	s.t.
9	Hans Junkermann (FRG)	Germany	s.t.
10	Jos Hoevenaers (BEL)	Belgium	s.t.

General classification after stage 6

Rank	Rider	Team	Time
1	Jacques Anquetil (FRA)	France	31h 25' 54"
2	Jean Dotto (FRA)	France - Centre	+ 5' 21"
3	Guido Carlesi (ITA)	Italy	+ 5' 22"
4	José Pérez Francés (ESP)	Spain	+ 5' 23"
5	Seamus Elliott (IRL)	Great Britain	+ 5' 27"
6	Eddy Pauwels (BEL)	Belgium	+ 7' 03"
7	Graziano Battistini (ITA)	Italy	+ 7' 49"
8	Henry Anglade (FRA)	France	+ 8' 01"
9	Carlo Brugnami (ITA)	Italy	+ 8' 10"
10	Charly Gaul (LUX)	Switzerland/Luxembourg	+ 8' 13"

== Stage 7 ==
1 July 1961 - Belfort to Chalon-sur-Saône, 214.5 km (133.3 mi)

Stage 7 result

Rank	Rider	Team	Time
1	Jean Stablinski (FRA)	France	5h 21' 11"
2	Joseph Groussard (FRA)	France	+ 1"
3	Michel Van Aerde (BEL)	Belgium	s.t.
4	Joseph Thomin (FRA)	France - West/South-West	s.t.
5	André Cloarec (FRA)	France - West/South-West	s.t.
6	Bernard Viot (FRA)	France - Paris/North-East	s.t.
7	Antoon van der Steen (NED)	Netherlands	s.t.
8	Adriano Zamboni (ITA)	Italy	s.t.
9	Jean Milesi (FRA)	France - Centre	s.t.
10	Robert Cazala (FRA)	France	s.t.

General classification after stage 7

Rank	Rider	Team	Time
1	Jacques Anquetil (FRA)	France	36h 53' 38"
2	Fernando Manzaneque (ESP)	Spain	+ 4' 37"
3	Jean Dotto (FRA)	France - Centre	+ 5' 21"
4	Guido Carlesi (ITA)	Italy	+ 5' 22"
5	José Pérez Francés (ESP)	Spain	+ 5' 23"
6	Seamus Elliott (IRL)	Great Britain	+ 5' 27"
7	Eddy Pauwels (BEL)	Belgium	+ 7' 03"
8	Graziano Battistini (ITA)	Italy	+ 7' 49"
9	Henry Anglade (FRA)	France	+ 8' 01"
10	Carlo Brugnami (ITA)	Italy	+ 8' 10"

== Stage 8 ==
2 July 1961 - Chalon-sur-Saône to Saint-Étienne, 240.5 km (149.4 mi)

Stage 8 result

Rank	Rider	Team	Time
1	Jean Forestier (FRA)	France	7h 05' 10"
2	Stéphane Lach (FRA)	France - Paris/North-East	+ 2"
3	Pierre Everaert (FRA)	France	+ 3' 39"
4	Adriano Zamboni (ITA)	Italy	+ 3' 43"
5	Jean Gainche (FRA)	France - West/South-West	+ 4' 09"
6	André Darrigade (FRA)	France	+ 4' 10"
7	Joseph Thomin (FRA)	France - West/South-West	s.t.
8	Guido Carlesi (ITA)	Italy	s.t.
9	André Cloarec (FRA)	France - West/South-West	s.t.
10	Mario Minieri (ITA)	Italy	s.t.

General classification after stage 8

Rank	Rider	Team	Time
1	Jacques Anquetil (FRA)	France	44h 02' 58"
2	Fernando Manzaneque (ESP)	Spain	+ 4' 37"
3	Jean Dotto (FRA)	France - Centre	+ 5' 21"
4	Guido Carlesi (ITA)	Italy	+ 5' 22"
5	José Pérez Francés (ESP)	Spain	+ 5' 23"
6	Seamus Elliott (IRL)	Great Britain	+ 5' 27"
7	Eddy Pauwels (BEL)	Belgium	+ 7' 03"
8	Graziano Battistini (ITA)	Italy	+ 7' 55"
9	Stéphane Lach (FRA)	France - Paris/North-East	+ 8' 31"
10	Henry Anglade (FRA)	France	+ 8' 07"

== Stage 9 ==
3 July 1961 - Saint-Étienne to Grenoble, 230 km (140 mi)

Stage 9 result

Rank	Rider	Team	Time
1	Charly Gaul (LUX)	Switzerland/Luxembourg	7h 30' 59"
2	Jacques Anquetil (FRA)	France	+ 1' 40"
3	Imerio Massignan (ITA)	Italy	s.t.
4	Hans Junkermann (FRG)	Germany	s.t.
5	Fernando Manzaneque (ESP)	Spain	s.t.
6	Guido Carlesi (ITA)	Italy	+ 3' 31"
7	José Pérez Francés (ESP)	Spain	s.t.
8	Raymond Mastrotto (FRA)	France	s.t.
9	Jean Gainche (FRA)	France - West/South-West	+ 5' 15"
10	Carlo Brugnami (ITA)	Italy	s.t.

General classification after stage 9

Rank	Rider	Team	Time
1	Jacques Anquetil (FRA)	France	51h 09' 12"
2	Fernando Manzaneque (ESP)	Spain	+ 5' 07"
3	Charly Gaul (LUX)	Switzerland/Luxembourg	+ 6' 03"
4	Guido Carlesi (ITA)	Italy	+ 7' 43"
5	José Pérez Francés (ESP)	Spain	+ 7' 44"
6	Hans Junkermann (FRG)	Germany	+ 8' 46"
7	Imerio Massignan (ITA)	Italy	+ 9' 06"
8	Jean Dotto (FRA)	France - Centre	+ 9' 52"
9	Raymond Mastrotto (FRA)	France	+ 10' 42"
10	Carlo Brugnami (ITA)	Italy	+ 12' 15"

== Stage 10 ==
4 July 1961 - Grenoble to Turin, 250.5 km (155.7 mi)

Stage 10 result

Rank	Rider	Team	Time
1	Guy Ignolin (FRA)	France - West/South-West	7h 30' 59"
2	Emmanuel Busto (FRA)	France - Centre	s.t.
3	Carlo Brugnami (ITA)	Italy	+ 11' 10"
4	André Darrigade (FRA)	France	+ 12' 31"
5	Jean Gainche (FRA)	France - West/South-West	s.t.
6	Bernard Viot (FRA)	France - Paris/North-East	s.t.
7	Frans Aerenhouts (BEL)	Belgium	s.t.
8	Brian Robinson (GBR)	Great Britain	s.t.
9	Imerio Massignan (ITA)	Italy	s.t.
10	Robert Cazala (FRA)	France	s.t.

General classification after stage 10

Rank	Rider	Team	Time
1	Jacques Anquetil (FRA)	France	58h 52' 40"
2	Fernando Manzaneque (ESP)	Spain	+ 5' 07"
3	Charly Gaul (LUX)	Switzerland/Luxembourg	+ 6' 03"
4	Guido Carlesi (ITA)	Italy	+ 7' 43"
5	José Pérez Francés (ESP)	Spain	+ 7' 44"
6	Hans Junkermann (FRG)	Germany	+ 8' 46"
7	Imerio Massignan (ITA)	Italy	+ 9' 06"
8	Jean Dotto (FRA)	France - Centre	+ 9' 52"
9	Raymond Mastrotto (FRA)	France	+ 10' 42"
10	Carlo Brugnami (ITA)	Italy	+ 10' 54"
