= 1961 Brabantse Pijl =

Race details
- Dates: 6 April 1961
- Stages: 1
- Distance: 180 km (111.8 mi)
- Winning time: 4h 44' 05"

Results
	Winner	Pino Cerami (BEL)
	Second	Michel Van Aerde (BEL)
	Third	Willy Schroeders (BEL)

The 1961 Brabantse Pijl was the inaugural edition of the Brabantse Pijl cycle race and was held on 6 April 1961. The race started and finished in Brussels. The race was won by Pino Cerami.

== General classification ==
Final general classification

Rank	Rider	Time
1	Pino Cerami (BEL)	4h 44' 05"
2	Michel Van Aerde (BEL)	+ 55"
3	Willy Schroeders (BEL)	+ 55"
4	Dieter Puschel (DEU)	+ 55"
5	Frans Aerenhouts (BEL)	+ 55"
6	Willy Vanden Berghen (BEL)	+ 1' 50"
7	Roger Baens (BEL)	+ 4' 25"
8	René Vanderveken (BEL)	+ 4' 25"
9	Robert Vanthournout (BEL)	+ 4' 25"
10	Raymond Impanis (BEL)	+ 8' 00"
