= 1962 Giro d'Italia =

Race details
- Dates: 19 May - 9 June 1962
- Stages: 21
- Distance: 4,180 km (2,597 mi)
- Winning time: 123h 06' 03"

Results
Jersey awarded to the overall winner	Winner	Franco Balmamion (ITA)	(Carpano)
	Second	Imerio Massignan (ITA)	(Legnano)
	Third	Nino Defilippis (ITA)	(Carpano)
	Mountains	Angelino Soler (ESP)	(Ghigi)
	Team	Faema	

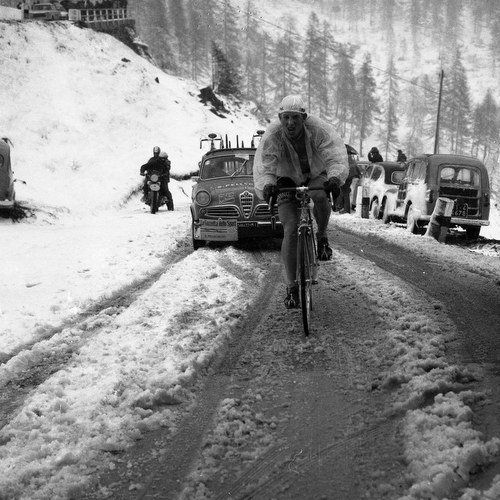
Vincenzo Meco towards win of Stage 14 near Passo Rolle on 2 June 1962

The 1962 Giro d'Italia was the 45th running of the Giro d'Italia, one of cycling's Grand Tour races. The Giro started in Milan, on 19 May, with a 185 km (115.0 mi) stage and concluded back in Milan, on 9 June, with a 160 km (99.4 mi) leg. A total of 130 riders from 13 teams entered the 21-stage race, which was won by Italian Franco Balmamion of the Carpano team. The second and third places were taken by Italian riders Imerio Massignan and Nino Defilippis, respectively.

== Teams ==
A total of 13 teams were invited to participate in the 1962 Giro d'Italia. Each team sent a squad of ten riders, so the Giro began with a peloton of 130 cyclists. Out of the 130 riders that started this edition of the Giro d'Italia, a total of 47 riders made it to the finish in Milan.

The 13 teams that took part in the race were:

- Atala
- Carpano
- Faema
- Ferrys
- Gazzola
- Ghigi
- Legnano
- Liberia
- Molteni
- Moschettieri
- Philco
- San Pellegrino
- Torpado

== Route and stages ==
The race route was revealed on 19 April 1962 by race director Vincenzo Torriani in Rome.

Stage results
Stage	Date	Course	Distance	Type	Winner
1	19 May	Milan to Tabiano Terme	185 km (115 mi)	Plain stage	Dino Liviero (ITA)
2	20 May	Salsomaggiore Terme to Sestri Levante	158 km (98 mi)	Stage with mountain(s)	Graziano Battistini (ITA)
3	21 May	Sestri Levante to Panicagliora (Marliana)	225 km (140 mi)	Stage with mountain(s)	Angelino Soler (ESP)
4	22 May	Montecatini Terme to Perugia	248 km (154 mi)	Plain stage	Antonio Bailetti (ITA)
5	23 May	Perugia to Rieti	258 km (160 mi)	Stage with mountain(s)	Joseph Carrara (FRA)
6	24 May	Rieti to Fiuggi	193 km (120 mi)	Stage with mountain(s)	Willy Schroeders (BEL)
7	25 May	Fiuggi to Montevergine di Mercogliano	224 km (139 mi)	Stage with mountain(s)	Armand Desmet (BEL)
8	26 May	Avellino to Foggia	110 km (68 mi)	Stage with mountain(s)	Huub Zilverberg (NED)
9	27 May	Foggia to Chieti	205 km (127 mi)	Plain stage	Rik Van Looy (BEL)
10	28 May	Chieti to Fano	218 km (135 mi)	Plain stage	Giuseppe Tonucci (ITA)
11	29 May	Fano to Castrocaro Terme	170 km (106 mi)	Stage with mountain(s)	Rik Van Looy (BEL)
12	30 May	Forlì to Lignano Sabbiadoro	298 km (185 mi)	Plain stage	Bruno Mealli (ITA)
13	31 May	Lignano Sabbiadoro to Nevegal	173 km (107 mi)	Stage with mountain(s)	Guido Carlesi (ITA)
	1 June	Rest day			
14	2 June	Belluno to Passo Rolle	160 km (99 mi)	Stage with mountain(s)	Vincenzo Meco (ITA)
15	3 June	Moena to Aprica	215 km (134 mi)	Stage with mountain(s)	Vittorio Adorni (ITA)
16	4 June	Aprica to Pian dei Resinelli	123 km (76 mi)	Stage with mountain(s)	Angelino Soler (ESP)
17	5 June	Lecco to Casale Monferrato	194 km (121 mi)	Plain stage	Armando Pellegrini (ITA)
18	6 June	Casale Monferrato to Frabosa Soprana	232 km (144 mi)	Stage with mountain(s)	Angelino Soler (ESP)
19	7 June	Frabosa Soprana to Saint-Vincent	193 km (120 mi)	Stage with mountain(s)	Giuseppe Sartore (ITA)
20	8 June	Saint-Vincent to Saint-Vincent	238 km (148 mi)	Stage with mountain(s)	Alberto Assirelli (ITA)
21	9 June	Saint-Vincent to Milan	160 km (99 mi)	Plain stage	Guido Carlesi (ITA)
	Total		4,180 km (2,597 mi)		

== Classification leadership ==
One leader's jersey was worn during the 1962 Giro d'Italia: the leader of the general classification – calculated by adding the stage finish times of each rider – wore a pink jersey. This classification is the most important of the race, and its winner is considered as the winner of the Giro.

A secondary classification was the mountains classification. The climbs were ranked in first and second categories. In this ranking, points were won by reaching the summit of a climb ahead of other cyclists. There were three categories of mountains. The first category awarded 50, 30, and 20 points, while the second distributed 40, 30, 20, and 10 points. In 1962, a rider did not need to finish to be eligible for the mountain classification. After Joseph Carrara left the race in stage 6, he was still leading this classification until the stage 13.

Although no jersey was awarded, there was also one classification for the teams, in which the teams were awarded points for their rider's performance during the stages. This classification was named the "Ramazzotti" classification, and points were given for high positions in stages, intermediate sprints and mountain tops, and leading the general classification.

The intermediate sprints from 1961 (called "traguardi tricolori") were repeated. These sprints were used in a new classification, named the Grand Prix d'Italia. For this classification, points were awarded at intermediate sprints but also at some of the mountain passes.

Classification leadership by stage
Stage	Winner	General classification	Mountains classification	Team classification
1	Dino Liviero	Dino Liviero	not awarded	Faema
2	Graziano Battistini	Dino Liviero	not awarded	Faema
3	Angelino Soler	Antonio Suárez	José Pérez Francés	Faema
4	Antonio Bailetti	Antonio Suárez	José Pérez Francés	Faema
5	Joseph Carrara	Antonio Suárez	Joseph Carrara	Faema
6	Willy Schroeders	Vincenzo Meco	Joseph Carrara	Faema
7	Armand Desmet	Armand Desmet	Joseph Carrara	Faema
8	Huub Zilverberg	Armand Desmet	Joseph Carrara	Faema
9	Rik Van Looy	Armand Desmet	Joseph Carrara	Faema
10	Giuseppe Tonucci	Armand Desmet	Joseph Carrara	Faema
11	Rik Van Looy	Armand Desmet	Joseph Carrara	Faema
12	Bruno Meali	Armand Desmet	Joseph Carrara	Faema
13	Guido Carlesi	Armand Desmet	Angelino Soler	Faema
14	Vincenzo Meco	Graziano Battistini	Angelino Soler	Faema
15	Vittorio Adorni	Graziano Battistini	Angelino Soler	Faema
16	Angelino Soler	Graziano Battistini	Angelino Soler	Faema
17	Armando Pellegrini	Franco Balmamion	Angelino Soler	Faema
18	Angelino Soler	Franco Balmamion	Angelino Soler	Faema
19	Giuseppe Sartore	Franco Balmamion	Angelino Soler	Faema
20	Alberto Assirelli	Franco Balmamion	Angelino Soler	Faema
21	Guido Carlesi	Franco Balmamion	Angelino Soler	Faema
Final		Franco Balmamion	Angelino Soler	Faema

== Final standings ==
Legend
Pink jersey	Denotes the winner of the General classification

=== General classification ===
Final general classification (1–10)
Rank	Name	Team	Time
1	Franco Balmamion (ITA)	Carpano	123h 07' 03"
2	Imerio Massignan (ITA)	Legnano	+ 3' 57"
3	Nino Defilippis (ITA)	Carpano	+ 5' 02"
4	Vito Taccone (ITA)	Atala	+ 5' 21"
5	Vittorio Adorni (ITA)	Philco	+ 7' 11"
6	José Pérez Francés (ESP)	Ferrys	+ 7' 29"
7	Ercole Baldini (ITA)	Moschettieri	+ 7' 54"
8	Graziano Battistini (ITA)	Legnano	+ 8' 05"
9	Guido Carlesi (ITA)	Philco	+ 14' 22"
10	Armand Desmet (BEL)	Faema	+ 15' 55"

=== Mountains classification ===
Final mountains classification (1–8)
	Name	Team	Points
1	Angelino Soler (ESP)	Ghigi	260
2	Joseph Carrara (FRA)	Libera	100
3	Vincenzo Meco (ITA)	San Pellegrino	60
4	Armando Pellegrini (ITA)	Molteni	50
4	Nino Defilippis (ITA)	Carpano	50
6	Imerio Massignan (ITA)	Legnano	40
6	Guido Neri (ITA)	Torpado	40
8	José Pérez Francés (ESP)	Ferrys	30
8	Renzo Fontona (ITA)	Legnano	30
8	Luigi Zanchetta (ITA)	Atala	30
8	Vittorio Adorni (ITA)	Philco	30
8	Alberto Assirelli (ITA)	Moschettieri	30

=== Team classification ===
Final team classification (1–10)
	Team	Points
1	Faema	3792
2	Philco	2928
3	Carpano	2714
4	Moschettieri	2681
5	Ghigi	2229
6	Molteni	2227
7	Legnano	2087
8	Torpado	2057
9	Atala	1378
10	San Pellegrino	1452
