= Tonucci =

Tonucci is an Italian surname. Notable people with the surname include:

- Alessandro Tonucci (born 1993), Italian motorcycle racer
- Denis Tonucci (born 1988), Italian footballer
- Giovanni Tonucci (born 1941), Italian titular archbishop
- Giuseppe Tonucci (1938–1988), Italian cyclist

== See also ==
- 8192 Tonucci, a main-belt asteroid
