= 1961 Tour de France =

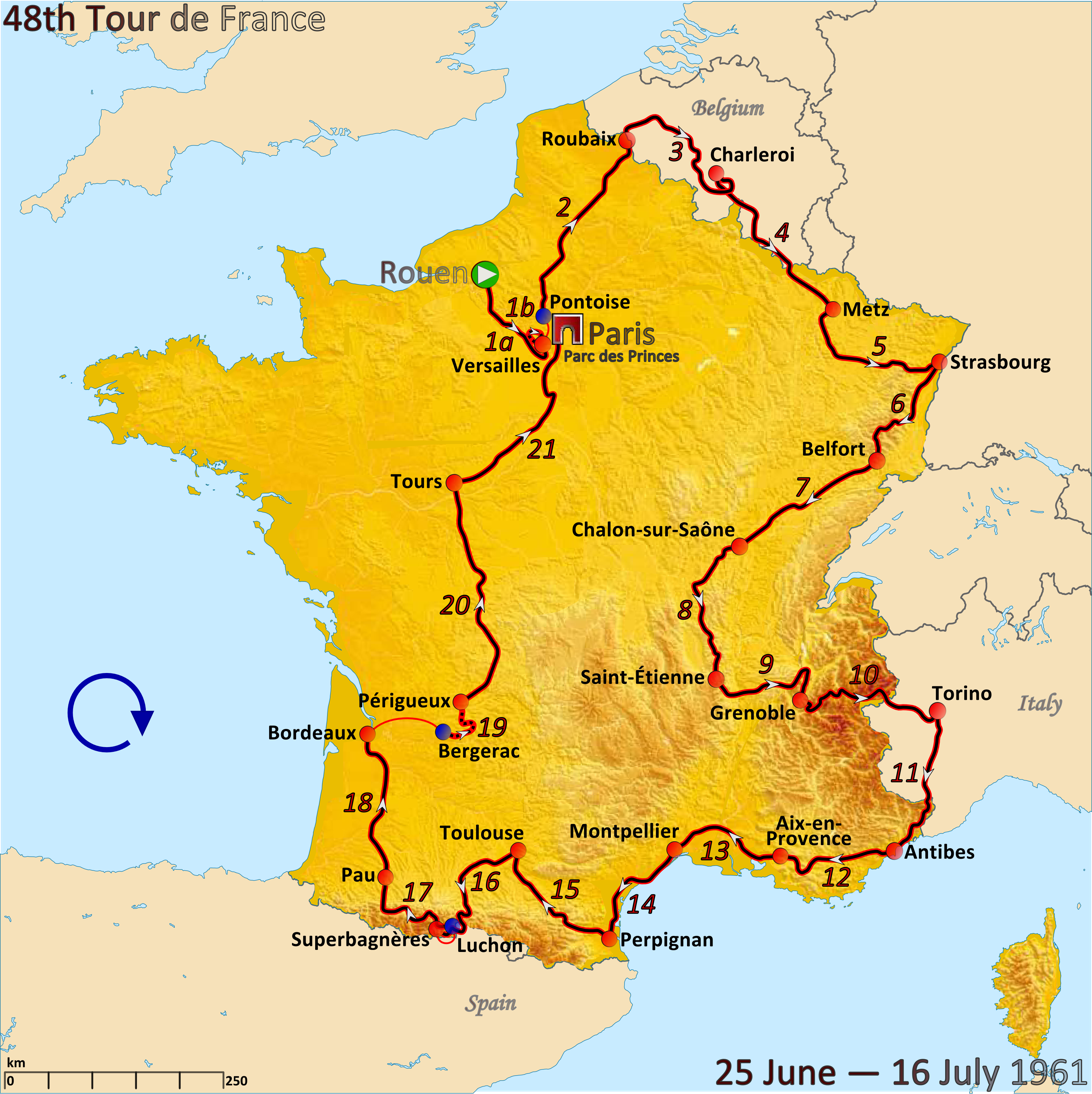
- Route of the 1961 Tour de France followed clockwise, starting in Rouen and finishing in Paris

Race details
- Dates: 25 June – 16 July 1961
- Stages: 21, including one split stage
- Distance: 4,397 km (2,732 mi)
- Winning time: 122h 01' 33"

Results
Jersey awarded to the overall winner	Winner	Jacques Anquetil (FRA)	(France)
	Second	Guido Carlesi (ITA)	(Italy)
	Third	Charly Gaul (LUX)	(Switzerland/Luxembourg)
Jersey awarded to the points classification winner	Points	André Darrigade (FRA)	(France)
	Mountains	Imerio Massignan (ITA)	(Italy)
	Combativity	West/South-West	
	Team	France	

The 1961 Tour de France was the 48th edition of the Tour de France, one of cycling's Grand Tours. It took place between 25 June and 16 July, with 21 stages covering a distance of 4,397 km (2,732 mi). Out of the 132 riders who started the tour, 72 managed to complete the tour's tough course. Throughout the 1961 Tour de France, two of the French national team's riders, André Darrigade and Jacques Anquetil held the yellow jersey for the entirety 21 stages. There was a great deal of excitement between the second and third places, concluding with Guido Carlesi stealing Charly Gaul's second-place position on the last day by two seconds.

== Teams ==
The teams entering the race were:

- Italy
- France
- Belgium
- Spain
- Netherlands
- West Germany
- Switzerland/Luxembourg
- Great Britain
- Paris/North-East
- Centre-Midi
- West/South-West

== Pre-race favourites ==
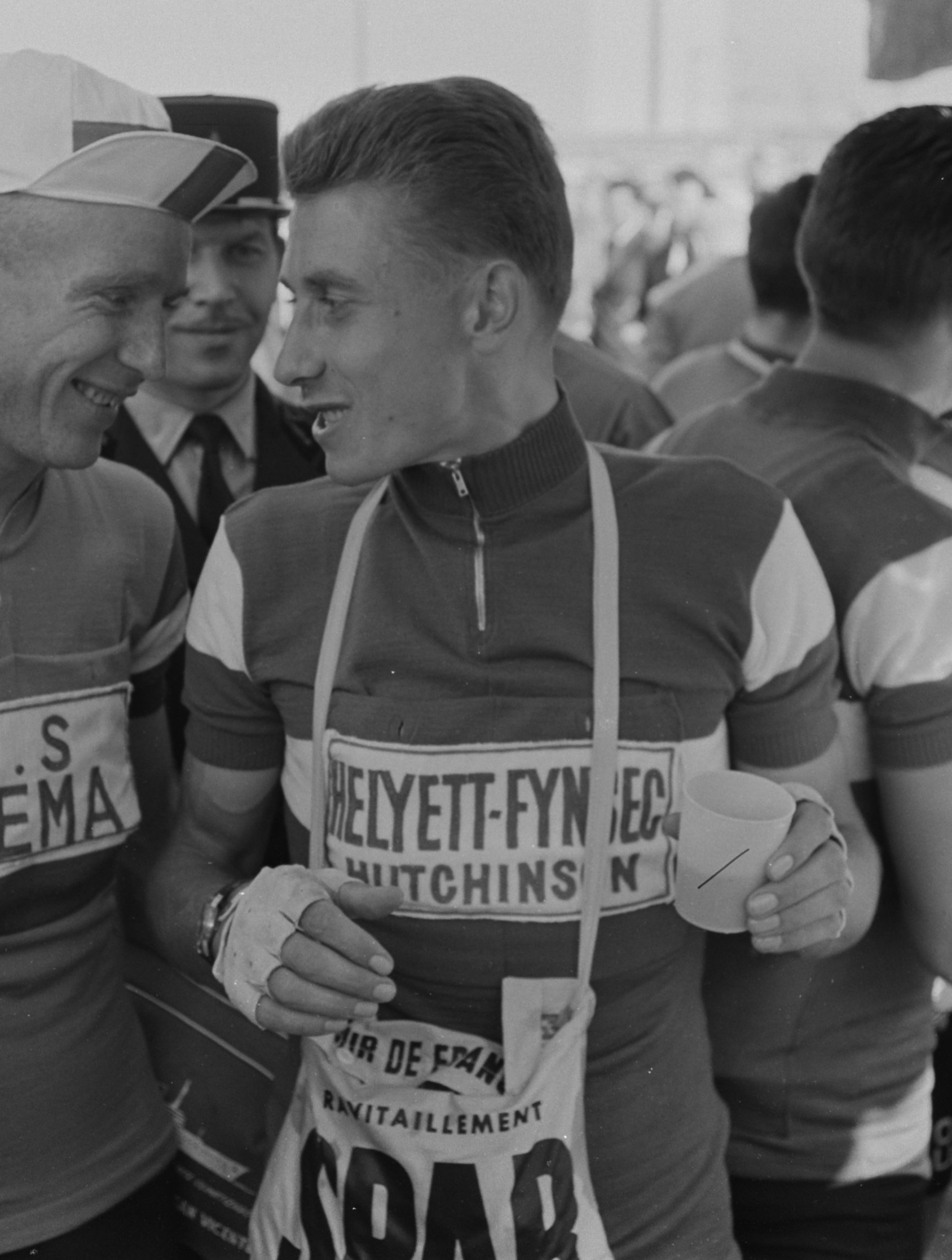
Pre-race favourite Jacques Anquetil (pictured during the Tour)

Since Jacques Anquetil had won the 1957 Tour de France, he was unable to repeat it, due to illness, tiredness and struggle within the French team. For 1961, he asked the team captain Marcel Bidot to make a team that would only ride for him, and Bidot agreed. Anquetil announced before the race that he would take the yellow jersey as leader of the general classification on the first day, and wear it until the end of the race in Paris.

Gastone Nencini, who won the previous edition, did not enter in 1961, but Graziano Battistini, his teammate and runner-up of 1960, started the race as leader of the Italian team. If the French team would again have internal struggles, the Italian team could emerge as the winner.

The Spanish team had two outsiders, José Pérez Francés and Fernando Manzaneque. The last outsider was Charly Gaul, winner of the 1958 Tour de France, who rode in the mixed Luxembourg/Swiss team. He considered his teammates so weak that he did not seek their help, and rode the race on his own. Raymond Poulidor was convinced by his team manager Antonin Magne that it would be better to skip the Tour, because the national team format would undermine his commercial value.

== Route and stages ==
The 1961 Tour de France started on 25 June in Rouen, and had one rest day, in Montpellier. For the first time the finish on top of the Superbagnères was included to the race. The highest point of elevation in the race was 2,115 m (6,939 ft) at the summit of the Col du Tourmalet mountain pass on stage 17.

Stage characteristics and winners
Stage	Date	Course	Distance	Type	Winner
1a	25 June	Rouen to Versailles	136.5 km (84.8 mi)	Plain stage	André Darrigade (FRA)
1b	25 June	Versailles	28.5 km (17.7 mi)	Individual time trial	Jacques Anquetil (FRA)
2	26 June	Pontoise to Roubaix	230.5 km (143.2 mi)	Plain stage	André Darrigade (FRA)
3	27 June	Roubaix to Charleroi (Belgium)	197.5 km (122.7 mi)	Plain stage	Emile Daems (BEL)
4	28 June	Charleroi (Belgium) to Metz	237.5 km (147.6 mi)	Plain stage	Anatole Novak (FRA)
5	29 June	Metz to Strasbourg	221 km (137 mi)	Stage with mountain(s)	Louis Bergaud (FRA)
6	30 June	Strasbourg to Belfort	180.5 km (112.2 mi)	Stage with mountain(s)	Jozef Planckaert (BEL)
7	1 July	Belfort to Chalon-sur-Saône	214.5 km (133.3 mi)	Plain stage	Jean Stablinski (FRA)
8	2 July	Chalon-sur-Saône to Saint-Étienne	240.5 km (149.4 mi)	Stage with mountain(s)	Jean Forestier (FRA)
9	3 July	Saint-Étienne to Grenoble	230 km (140 mi)	Stage with mountain(s)	Charly Gaul (LUX)
10	4 July	Grenoble to Turin (Italy)	250.5 km (155.7 mi)	Stage with mountain(s)	Guy Ignolin (FRA)
11	5 July	Turin (Italy) to Antibes	225 km (140 mi)	Stage with mountain(s)	Guido Carlesi (ITA)
12	6 July	Antibes to Aix-en-Provence	199.0 km (123.7 mi)	Stage with mountain(s)	Michel Van Aerde (BEL)
13	7 July	Aix-en-Provence to Montpellier	177.5 km (110.3 mi)	Plain stage	André Darrigade (FRA)
	8 July	Montpellier		Rest day	
14	9 July	Montpellier to Perpignan	174 km (108 mi)	Plain stage	Eddy Pauwels (BEL)
15	10 July	Perpignan to Toulouse	206 km (128 mi)	Plain stage	Guido Carlesi (ITA)
16	11 July	Toulouse to Superbagnères	208 km (129 mi)	Stage with mountain(s)	Imerio Massignan (ITA)
17	12 July	Luchon to Pau	197 km (122 mi)	Stage with mountain(s)	Eddy Pauwels (BEL)
18	13 July	Pau to Bordeaux	207 km (129 mi)	Plain stage	Martin Van Geneugden (BEL)
19	14 July	Bergerac to Périgueux	74.5 km (46.3 mi)	Individual time trial	Jacques Anquetil (FRA)
20	15 July	Périgueux to Tours	309.5 km (192.3 mi)	Plain stage	André Darrigade (FRA)
21	16 July	Tours to Paris	252.5 km (156.9 mi)	Plain stage	Robert Cazala (FRA)
	Total		4,397 km (2,732 mi)		

== Race overview ==
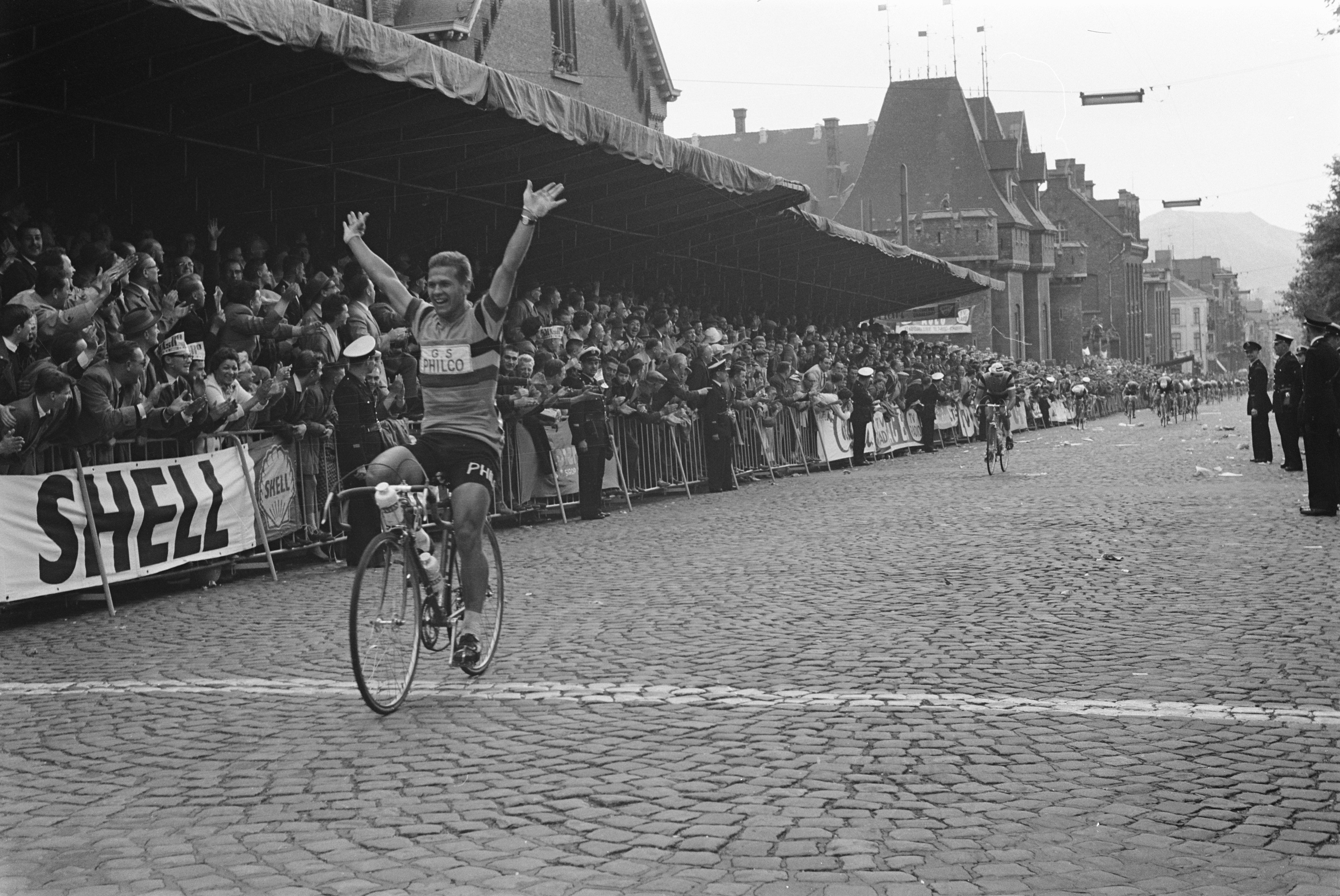
Emile Daems crossing the finish line in Charleroi, Belgium, to win the third stage

André Darrigade won the opening stage, and it became the fifth time that he won the opening stage. Darrigade had been in a small group that broke away, which included Anquetil. Other competitors, such as Gaul and Battistini, already lost more than 5 minutes. After that, there was a time trial, won by Jacques Anquetil. Anquetil became the leader of the race, with his teammate Joseph Groussard in second place, almost five minutes behind him.

The second stage, run in bad weather, featured small roads in Northern France. Several cyclists got into problems, and seven cyclists already had to leave the race; the favourites were not harmed. In the sixth stage, West German Horst Oldenburg fell down on the descent of the Col de la Schlucht, and the Dutch team captain Ab Geldermans ran into him. Geldermans was taken to the Belfort hospital by helicopter, and the Dutch team had lost its captain.

Unlike previous years, the French team continued without fights, and won five of the first eight stages. The ninth stage included four major climbs. On the second climb, Gaul escaped. He crashed on the descent of the third mountain, but managed to stay away and win the stage; Anquetil was not far behind and kept the lead. Anquetil had a five-minutes margin on the second-placed rider, which was Manzaneque. In the eleventh stage, Graziano Battistini was hit by a car, and had to leave the race. This situation had not changed when the sixteenth stage started. It was expected that Gaul, in third place more than six minutes behind, would attack, but this did not happen, because Gaul had been injured in his crash in the previous stage.

The last chance for the opposition to win back time on Anquetil was in the seventeenth stage, but Anquetil stayed close to his direct competitors, and only allowed lower classified riders to escape. The press criticized Anquetil's tactics, saying he was riding passively. In the nineteenth stage, an individual time trial, Gaul was on his way to win back a little time on Anquetil, when he crashed heavily, and could not find his pace again. Anquetil won almost three minutes on Gaul and extended his lead to more than ten minutes.

In the final two stages, Anquetil did not get into problems. His main rival Gaul even lost time in the last stage, and conceded his second place to Guido Carlesi.

== Classification leadership and minor prizes ==
There were several classifications in the 1961 Tour de France, two of them awarding jerseys to their leaders. The most important was the general classification, calculated by adding each cyclist's finishing times on each stage. The cyclist with the least accumulated time was the race leader, identified by the yellow jersey; the winner of this classification is considered the winner of the Tour.

Additionally, there was a points classification. In the points classification, cyclists got points for finishing among the best in a stage finish. The cyclist with the most points lead the classification, and was identified with a green jersey.

There was also a mountains classification. Most stages of the race included one or more categorised climbs, in which points were awarded to the riders that reached the summit first. The climbs were categorised as third-, second- or first-category, with the more difficult climbs rated lower. The cyclist with the most points lead the classification, but was not identified with a jersey.

For the team classification The calculation was different from previous years. Before 1961, the classification was based on time, but in 1961, it was based on points; times of the best three cyclists per team on each stage were added; the team with the lowest time on a stage won the team prize for that stage. The overall team classification was calculated by counting the number of team prizes.

In addition, there was a combativity award, in which a jury composed of journalists gave points after each stage to the cyclist they considered most combative. The split stages each had a combined winner. At the conclusion of the Tour, the entire West/South-West team won the overall super-combativity award, also decided by journalists. The Souvenir Henri Desgrange was given in honour of Tour founder Henri Desgrange to the first rider to pass the summit of the Ballon d'Alsace on stage 6. This prize was won by Jef Planckaert.

Classification leadership by stage
Stage	Winner	General classification	Points classification	Mountains classification (Note: No jersey was awarded to the leader of the mountains classification until a white jersey with red polka dots was introduced in 1975.)	Team classification	Combativity award	Bad luck award
1a	André Darrigade	André Darrigade	André Darrigade	no award	France	Jacques Anquetil	José Pérez Francés
1b	Jacques Anquetil	Jacques Anquetil	Jacques Anquetil	no award	France	Jacques Anquetil	José Pérez Francés
2	André Darrigade	Jacques Anquetil	André Darrigade	no award	France	Pierre Beuffeuil	no award
3	Emile Daems	Jacques Anquetil	André Darrigade	Eddy Pauwels	France	René Vanderveken	Jos Hoevenaers
4	Anatole Novak	Jacques Anquetil	André Darrigade	Eddy Pauwels	France	Bernard Viot	Dieter Puschel
5	Louis Bergaud	Jacques Anquetil	André Darrigade	Louis Bergaud	France	Stéphane Lach	Jos Hoevenaers
6	Jozef Planckaert	Jacques Anquetil	André Darrigade	Eddy Pauwels	France	Jef Planckaert	Albertus Geldermans
7	Jean Stablinski	Jacques Anquetil	André Darrigade	Eddy Pauwels	France	Fernando Manzaneque	René Vanderveken
8	Jean Forestier	Jacques Anquetil	André Darrigade	Eddy Pauwels	France	Stéphane Lach	Joseph Wasko
9	Charly Gaul	Jacques Anquetil	André Darrigade	Charly Gaul	France	Charly Gaul	no award
10	Guy Ignolin	Jacques Anquetil	André Darrigade	Imerio Massignan	France	Guy Ignolin	Netherlands
11	Guido Carlesi	Jacques Anquetil	André Darrigade	Imerio Massignan	France	Guido Carlesi	Graziano Battistini
12	Michel Van Aerde	Jacques Anquetil	André Darrigade	Imerio Massignan	France	Édouard Bihouée	Valentin Huot
13	André Darrigade	Jacques Anquetil	André Darrigade	Imerio Massignan	France	Antoine Abate	Bernard Viot
14	Eddy Pauwels	Jacques Anquetil	André Darrigade	Imerio Massignan	France	Joseph Wasko	Jan Westdorp
15	Guido Carlesi	Jacques Anquetil	André Darrigade	Imerio Massignan	France	Seamus Elliott	Jean Stablinski
16	Imerio Massignan	Jacques Anquetil	André Darrigade	Imerio Massignan	France	Ken Laidlaw	André Le Dissez
17	Eddy Pauwels	Jacques Anquetil	André Darrigade	Imerio Massignan	France	Marcel Queheille	Friedhelm Fischerkeller
18	Martin Van Geneugden	Jacques Anquetil	André Darrigade	Imerio Massignan	France	Joseph Wasko	Guy Ignolin
19	Jacques Anquetil	Jacques Anquetil	Jean Gainche	Imerio Massignan	France	Jean Gainche	Guido Carlesi
20	André Darrigade	Jacques Anquetil	André Darrigade	Imerio Massignan	France	Guy Ignolin	no award
21	Robert Cazala	Jacques Anquetil	André Darrigade	Imerio Massignan	France	Marcel Queheille	Jean Forestier
Final		Jacques Anquetil	André Darrigade	Imerio Massignan	France	West/South-West	Graziano Battistini

== Final standings ==
=== General classification ===
Final general classification (1–10)
Rank	Rider	Team	Time
1	Jacques Anquetil (FRA)	France	122h 01' 33"
2	Guido Carlesi (ITA)	Italy	+12' 14"
3	Charly Gaul (LUX)	Switzerland/Luxembourg	+12' 16"
4	Imerio Massignan (ITA)	Italy	+15' 59"
5	Hans Junkermann (FRG)	West Germany	+16' 09"
6	Fernando Manzaneque (ESP)	Spain	+16' 27"
7	José Pérez Francés (ESP)	Spain	+20' 41"
8	Jean Dotto (FRA)	Centre-Midi	+21' 44"
9	Eddy Pauwels (BEL)	Belgium	+26' 57"
10	Jan Adriaensens (BEL)	Belgium	+28' 05"

Final general classification (11–72)
Rank	Rider	Team	Time
11	Jos Hoevenaers (BEL)	Belgium	+28' 27"
12	Alfred Rüegg (SUI)	Switzerland/Luxembourg	+32' 14"
13	Michel Van Aerde (BEL)	Belgium	+40' 34"
14	Jean Gainche (FRA)	West/South-West	+41' 26"
15	Jozef Planckaert (BEL)	Belgium	+41' 53"
16	Adriano Zamboni (ITA)	Italy	+43' 26"
17	Frans Aerenhouts (BEL)	Belgium	+45' 52"
18	Henry Anglade (FRA)	France	+47' 38"
19	Raymond Mastrotto (FRA)	France	+53' 19"
20	André Foucher (FRA)	West/South-West	+58' 08"
21	Marcel Queheille (FRA)	West/South-West	+58' 42"
22	Claude Mattio (FRA)	Centre-Midi	+58' 42
23	Édouard Bihouée (FRA)	West/South-West	+1h 05' 05"
24	Joseph Wasko (FRA)	Paris/North-East	+1h 06' 28"
25	Joseph Thomin (FRA)	West/South-West	+1h 06' 45"
26	Elio Gerussi (FRA)	Paris/North-East	+1h 07' 33"
27	Fernand Picot (FRA)	West/South-West	+1h 17' 41"
28	Pierre Beuffeuil (FRA)	West/South-West	+1h 19' 15"
29	Stéphan Lach (FRA)	Paris/North-East	+1h 19' 40"
30	Georges Groussard (FRA)	West/South-West	+1h 20' 58"
31	Louis Rostollan (FRA)	France	+1h 23' 12"
32	André Darrigade (FRA)	France	+1h 24' 51"
33	Aldo Bolzan (LUX)	Switzerland/Luxembourg	+1h 26' 05"
34	Jean Milesi (FRA)	Centre-Midi	+1h 26' 39"
35	Jean Forestier (FRA)	France	+1h 28' 11"
36	Jean-Baptiste Claes (BEL)	Belgium	+1h 28' 25"
37	Marcel Ernzer (LUX)	Switzerland/Luxembourg	+1h 31' 57"
38	Luis Otaño (ESP)	Spain	+1h 32' 07"
39	Valentin Huot (FRA)	Centre-Midi	+1h 34' 50"
40	Robert Cazala (FRA)	France	+1h 36' 23"
41	Gérard Thielin (FRA)	Centre-Midi	+1h 38' 47"
42	Jean Stablinski (FRA)	France	+1h 39' 10"
43	Renzo Accordi (ITA)	Italy	+1h 46' 43"
44	Mario Minieri (ITA)	Italy	+1h 47' 49"
45	Joseph Groussard (FRA)	France	+1h 49' 00"
46	Louis Bergaud (FRA)	Centre-Midi	+1h 50' 03"
47	Seamus Elliott (IRL)	Great Britain	+1h 51' 05"
48	Manuel Busto (FRA)	Centre-Midi	+1h 54' 45"
49	Julio San Emeterio (ESP)	Spain	+1h 54' 55"
50	Roberto Falaschi (ITA)	Italy	+2h 00' 22"
51	Piet Damen (NED)	Netherlands	+2h 03' 12"
52	Antoine Abate (FRA)	Centre-Midi	+2h 04' 06"
53	Brian Robinson (GBR)	Great Britain	+2h 04' 23"
54	Dieter Puschel (FRG)	West Germany	+2h 07' 57"
55	Juan Campillo (ESP)	Spain	+2h 09' 46"
56	Armando Pellegrini (ITA)	Italy	+2h 10' 22"
57	Bernard Viot (FRA)	Paris/North-East	+2h 20' 00"
58	Jaap Kersten (NED)	Netherlands	+2h 20' 12"
59	Guy Ignolin (FRA)	West/South-West	+2h 22' 04"
60	Rolf Graf (SUI)	Switzerland/Luxembourg	+2h 24' 13"
61	Martin Van Geneugden (BEL)	Belgium	+2h 26' 24"
62	René Marigil (ESP)	Spain	+2h 29' 09"
63	Fritz Gallati (SUI)	Switzerland/Luxembourg	+2h 30' 04"
64	Antoon Van der Steen (NED)	Netherlands	+2h 31' 35"
65	Ken Laidlaw (GBR)	Great Britain	+2h 45' 47"
66	Jan Westdorp (NED)	Netherlands	+2h 51' 39"
67	Serge Ruchet (SUI)	Switzerland/Luxembourg	+2h 54' 23"
68	Pierre Everaert (FRA)	France	+3h 01' 02"
69	Vicente Iturat (ESP)	Spain	+3h 08' 02"
70	Raymond Hoorelbeke (FRA)	Paris/North-East	+3h 19' 42"
71	Jean-Claude Lefebvre (FRA)	Paris/North-East	+3h 47' 49"
72	André Geneste (FRA)	Paris/North-East	+4h 12' 56"

=== Points classification ===
Final points classification (1–10)
Rank	Rider	Team	Points
1	André Darrigade (FRA)	France	174
2	Jean Gainche (FRA)	West/South-West	169
3	Guido Carlesi (ITA)	Italy	148
4	Jacques Anquetil (FRA)	France	146
5	Frans Aerenhouts (BEL)	Belgium	118
6	Michel Van Aerde (BEL)	Belgium	97
7	Eddy Pauwels (BEL)	Belgium	95
8	Imerio Massignan (ITA)	Italy	92
9	Hans Junkermann (FRG)	West Germany	82
10	Jozef Planckaert (BEL)	Belgium	74

=== Mountains classification ===
Final mountains classification (1–10)
Rank	Rider	Team	Points
1	Imerio Massignan (ITA)	Italy	95
2	Charly Gaul (LUX)	Switzerland/Luxembourg	61
3	Hans Junkermann (FRG)	West Germany	48
4	Marcel Queheille (FRA)	West/South-West	46
5	Eddy Pauwels (BEL)	Belgium	29
6	Manuel Busto (FRA)	Centre-Midi	28
7	Guy Ignolin (FRA)	West/South-West	26
7	Jacques Anquetil (FRA)	France	26
9	Jef Planckaert (BEL)	Belgium	19
10	Jean Dotto (FRA)	Centre-Midi	17
10	André Foucher (FRA)	West/South-West	17

=== Team classification ===
Final team classification
Rank	Team	1sts	2nds	3rds
1	France	10	2	1
2	Belgium	5	5	3
3	Italy	3	4	6
4	West/South-West	3	3	2
5	Centre-Midi	1	4	—
6	Paris/North-East	—	2	3
7	Netherlands	—	1	2
8	Switzerland/Luxembourg	—	1	1
9	Spain	—	—	2
10	West Germany	—	—	2
11	Great Britain	—	—	—

== Aftermath ==
As Anquetil had led the race after every stage, there was not much competitiveness, which organiser Jacques Goddet termed a "fiasco". After the race, the system with national teams was abandoned, and it was announced that the 1962 Tour de France would be run with sponsored teams.

== Bibliography ==
- Augendre, Jacques (2016). "Guide historique" [Historical guide] (PDF). Tour de France (in French). Paris: Amaury Sport Organisation. Archived (PDF) from the original on 17 August 2016.
- Dauncey, Hugh; Hare, Geoff (2003). The Tour de France, 1903-2003: A Century of Sporting Structures, Meanings and Values. Routledge. ISBN 0-7146-5362-4.
- McGann, Bill; McGann, Carol (2006). The Story of the Tour de France: 1903–1964. Vol. 1. Indianapolis: Dog Ear Publishing. ISBN 978-1-59858-180-5.
- Nauright, John; Parrish, Charles (2012). Sports Around the World: History, Culture, and Practice. Vol. 2. Santa Barbara, California: ABCCLIO. ISBN 978-1-59884-300-2.
- van den Akker, Pieter (2018). Tour de France Rules and Statistics: 1903–2018. Self-published. ISBN 978-1-79398-080-9.
