= Superbagnères =

Ski resort in Haute-Garonne, France

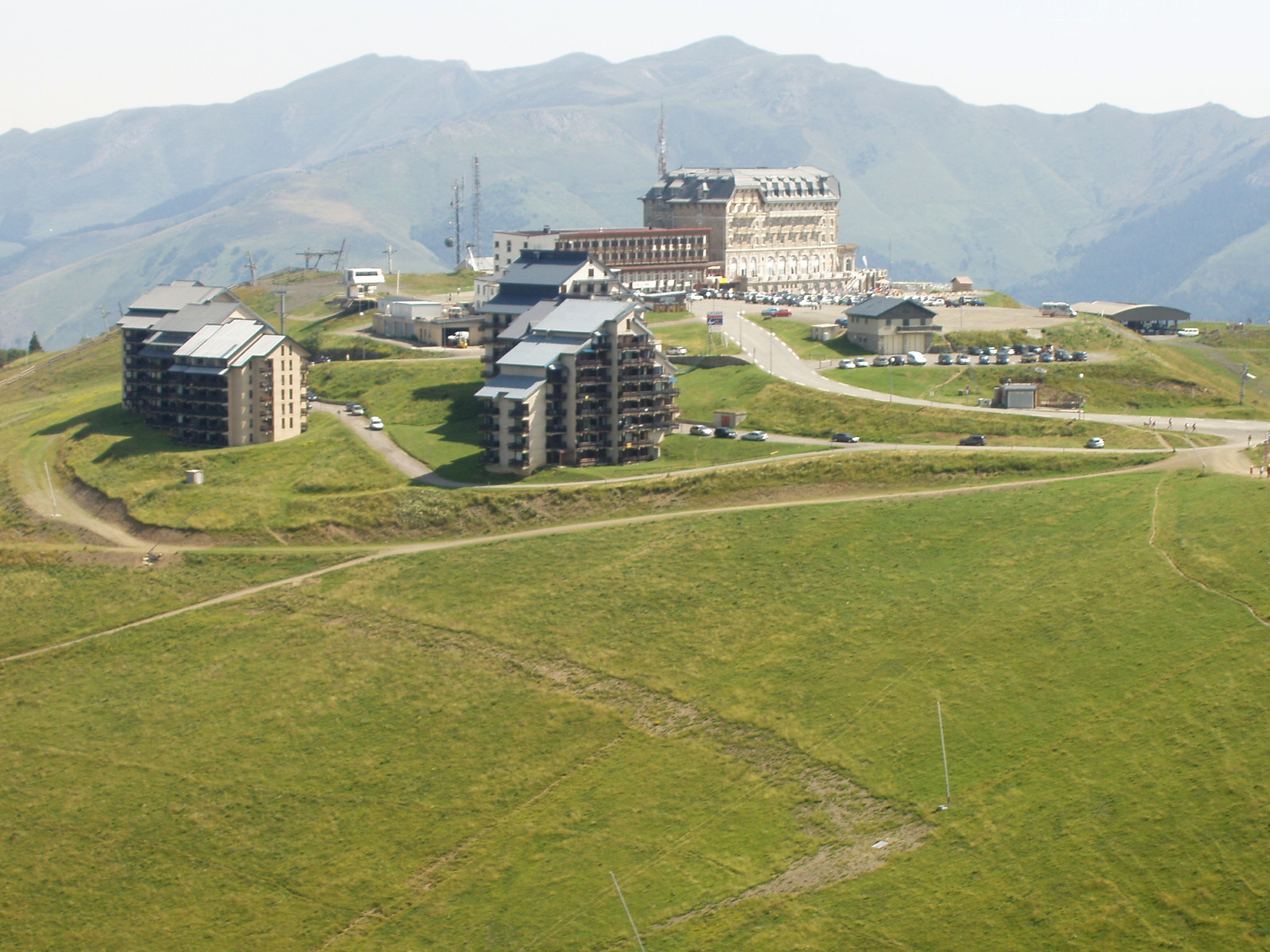
- Luchon-Superbagnères ski resort

- Location within France Location within Occitanie Location within Pyrenees
- Location: Saint-Aventin
- Nearest city: Tarbes
- Coordinates: 42°46′4.8″N 0°34′37.2″E
- Top elevation: 2,256 m (7,402 ft)
- Base elevation: 1,775 m (5,823 ft)
- Trails: 30
- Total length: 32 km (20 mi)
- Lift system: 14
- Website: www.luchon.com

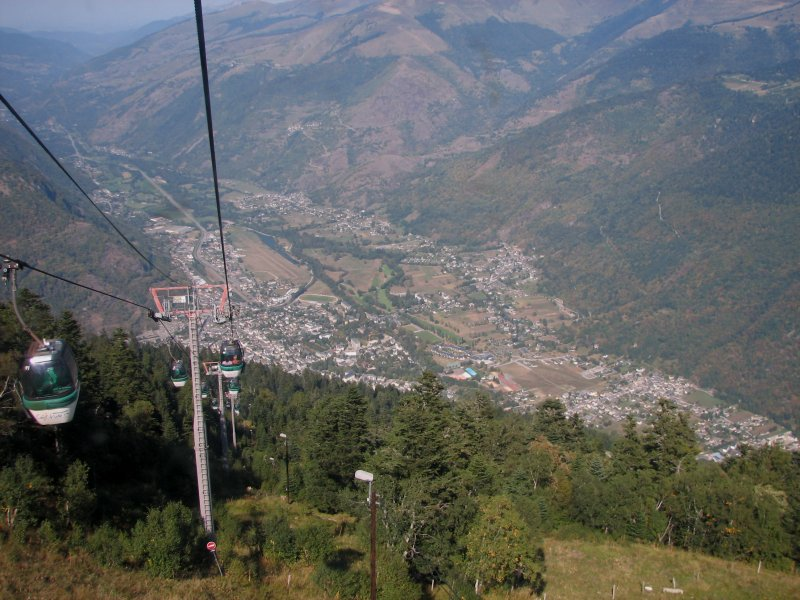
Luchon from the ski cabin.

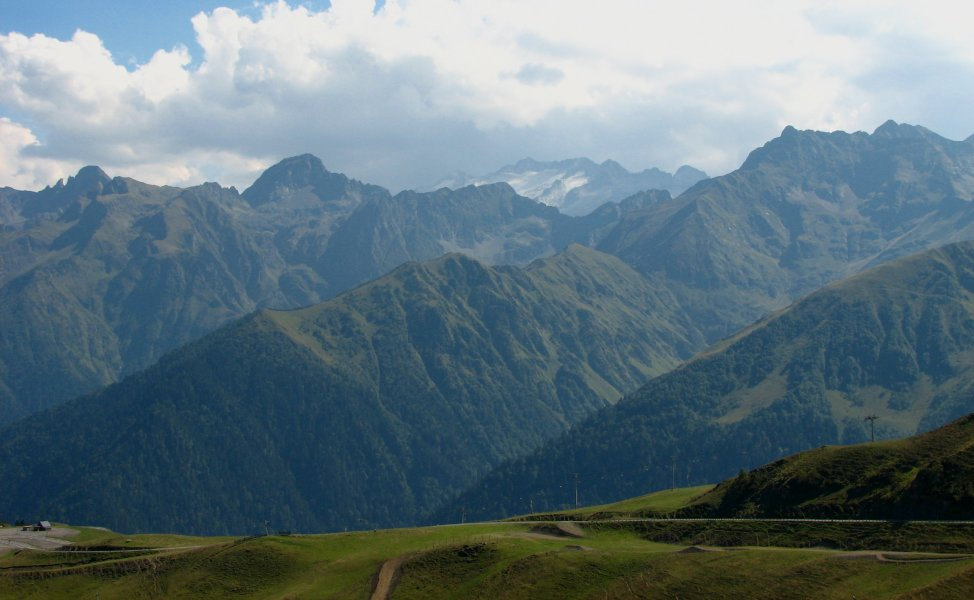
Ski slopes in the summer. The most distant mountain in the image is the Aneto, the highest mountain in the Pyrenees.

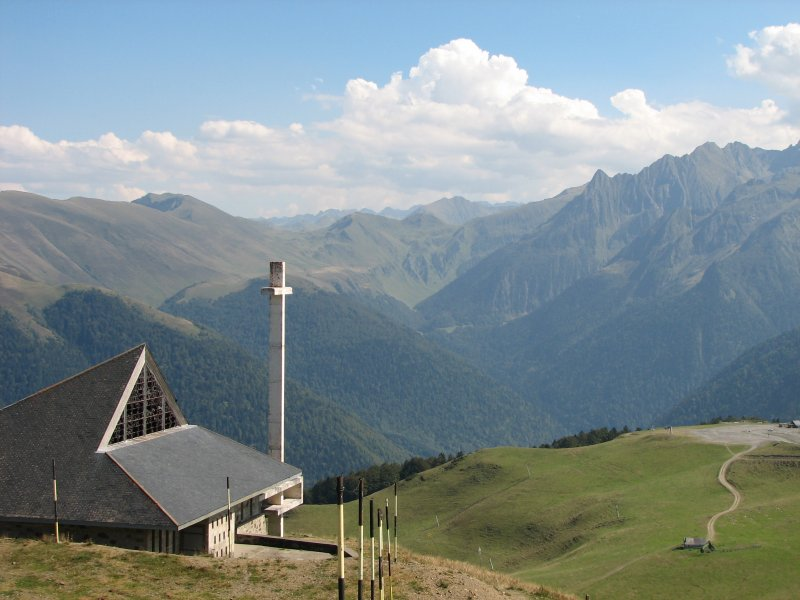
Superbagnères Chapel.

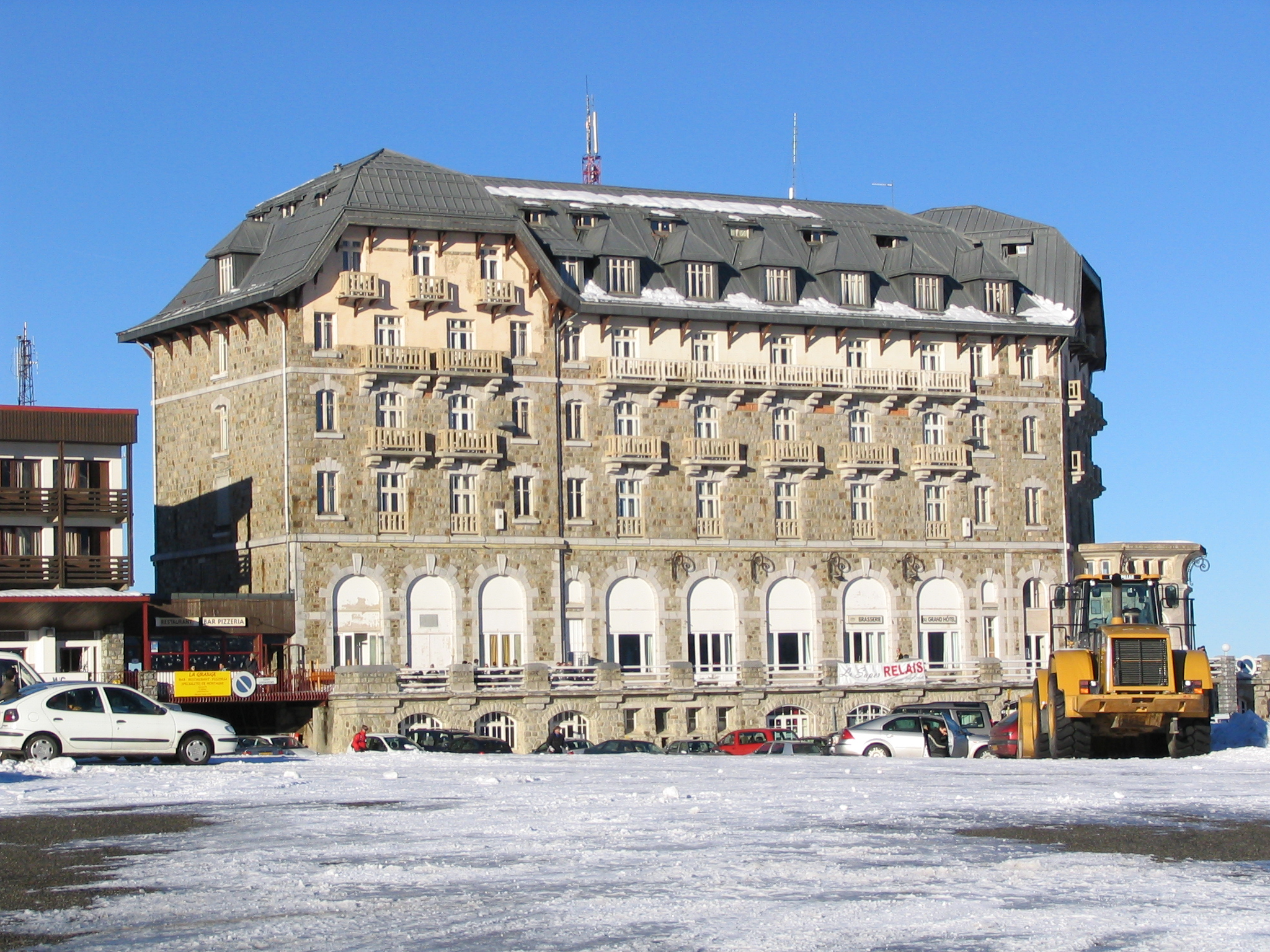
The Grand Hôtel at Superbagnères.

Superbagnères (French pronunciation: [sypɛʁbaɲɛʁ]) is a ski resort above the town of Bagnères-de-Luchon in the French department of Haute-Garonne in the Midi-Pyrénées region.

== Overview ==
The resort offers alpine ski slopes and cross-country skiing from 1440 to 2260 m. The resort was opened early in the twentieth century. Historically it was connected to the town by a rack railway, but today it is connected with a gondola lift. Each cabin holds up to four people and takes about ten minutes to reach the summit, running in the summer as well as the winter. It's not possible to ski back down to Luchon, except in times of exceptional snow for talented locals who know the woods.

== Details of climb ==
From Bagnères-de-Luchon the climb to the ski-station is 18.5 km at an average gradient of 6.3%, with the summit being at 1800 m above sea-level. There are several short stretches in excess of 10%.

== Tour de France ==
As of 2025, the Tour de France has had stage finishes at Superbagnères seven times, most recently in 2025.

Year	Stage	Start of stage	Distance (km)	Category of climb	Stage winner	Yellow jersey
2025	14	Pau	183	HC	Thymen Arensman (NED)	Tadej Pogačar (SLO)
1989	10	Cauterets	136	1	Robert Millar (GBR)	Laurent Fignon (FRA)
1986	13	Pau	186	HC	Greg LeMond (USA)	Bernard Hinault (FRA)
1979	2	Bagnères-de-Luchon	23.87 (ITT)	1	Bernard Hinault (FRA)	Bernard Hinault (FRA)
1971	15	Bagnères-de-Luchon	19.6	1	José Manuel Fuente (ESP)	Eddy Merckx (BEL)
1962	13	Bagnères-de-Luchon	18.25 (ITT)	1	Federico Bahamontes (ESP)	Joseph Planckaert (BEL)
1961	16	Toulouse	208	1	Imerio Massignan (ITA)	Jacques Anquetil (FRA)
