= Vincenzo Meco =

Italian cyclist

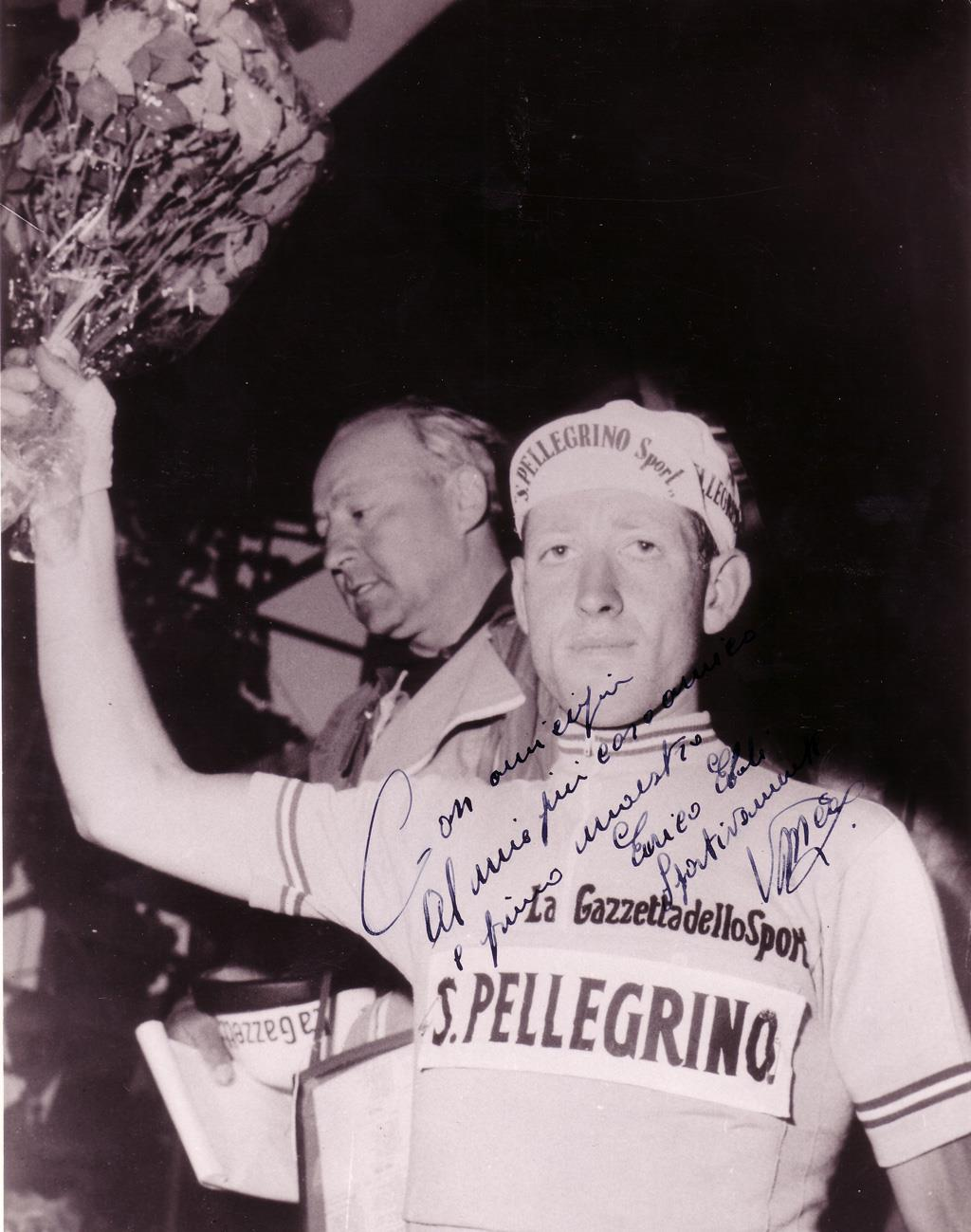
- Winner of Stage 14 of the 1962 Giro d'Italia on 2 June 1962

Personal information
- Born: 1 October 1940 (age 86)

Cycling career
- Sport: Cycling
- Role: Rider

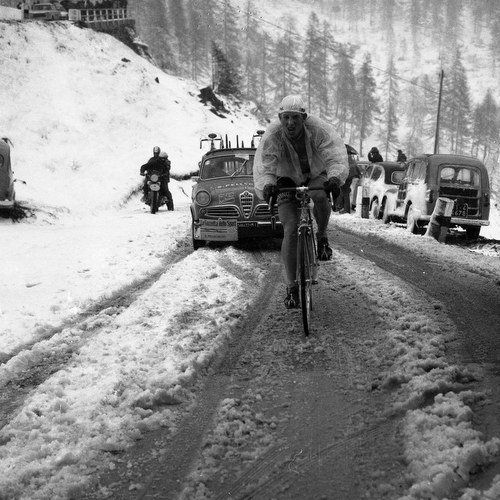
Vincenzo Meco at Passo Rolle towards win of Stage 14 of the 1962 Giro d'Italia on 2 June 1962

Vincenzo Meco (born 1 October 1940) is an Italian racing cyclist. He won stage 14 of the 1962 Giro d'Italia.
