= Joseph Wasko =

French cyclist (1931–2026)

Personal information
- Born: 28 November 1931 Vineuil-Saint-Firmin, France
- Died: 13 July 2026 (aged 94) Labruyère, Oise, France

Cycling career
- Sport: Cycling
- Role: Rider

Joseph Wasko (28 November 1931 – 13 July 2026) was a French professional racing cyclist. He rode in the 1960 and 1961 Tour de France. Wasko died in Labruyère, Oise on 13 July 2026, at the age of 94.
