= Alberto Assirelli =

Italian cyclist

Personal information
- Born: 31 August 1936 Forlì, Italy
- Died: 1 April 2017 (aged 80) Forlì, Italy

Cycling career
- Sport: Cycling
- Role: Rider

Major wins
- Grand Tours Tour de France 1 individual stage (1962)

Alberto Assirelli (31 August 1936 – 1 April 2017) was an Italian racing cyclist. He won stage 20 of the 1962 Giro d'Italia.
