= André Cloarec =

French cyclist

Personal information
- Born: 31 July 1937
- Died: 18 December 1998 (aged 61)

Cycling career
- Sport: Cycling
- Role: Rider

André Cloarec (31 July 1937 – 18 December 1998) was a French racing cyclist. He rode in the 1961 Tour de France.
