= Dino Liviero =

Italian cyclist (1938–1970)

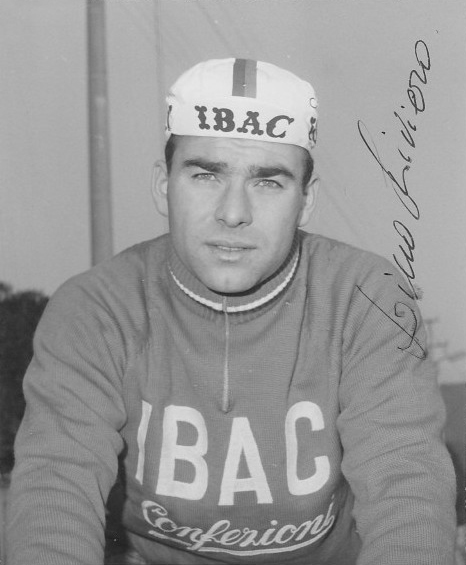
- Liviero in 1964

Personal information
- Full name: Dino Liviero
- Born: 30 May 1938 Castelfranco Veneto, Italy
- Died: 6 May 1970 (aged 31) Vedelago, Italy

Cycling career
- Sport: Cycling
- Discipline: Road
- Role: Rider

Professional teams
- 1959–1962: Torpado
- 1963: Lygie
- 1964: IBAC

Major wins
- Giro d'Italia, 1 stage; Giro di Campania (1960); GP Cemab (1962)

Dino Liviero (30 May 1938 – 6 May 1970) was an Italian road racing cyclist. Born in Castelfranco Veneto, he won a Giro di Campania (1960) and a stage in Roma–Napoli–Roma (1960), plus a stage in the 1962 Giro d'Italia. In 1955 he won Coppa Città di San Daniele.
