= Elio Gerussi =

Italian cyclist

Personal information
- Born: 20 July 1935 Marly, France
- Died: 17 May 1988 (aged 52) Rouvignies, France

Cycling career
- Sport: Cycling
- Role: Rider

Elio Gerussi (20 July 1935 – 17 May 1988) was an Italian racing cyclist. He rode in the 1961 Tour de France.
