= Renzo Accordi =

Italian cyclist (1930–2005)

Personal information
- Born: 23 September 1930 Gazzo Veronese, Kingdom of Italy
- Died: 25 January 2005 (aged 74) Cuveglio, Italy

Cycling career
- Sport: Cycling
- Role: Rider

Renzo Accordi (23 August 1930 – 25 January 2005) was an Italian racing cyclist. He rode in the 1961 Tour de France.
