= Anatole Novak =

French cyclist (1937–2022)

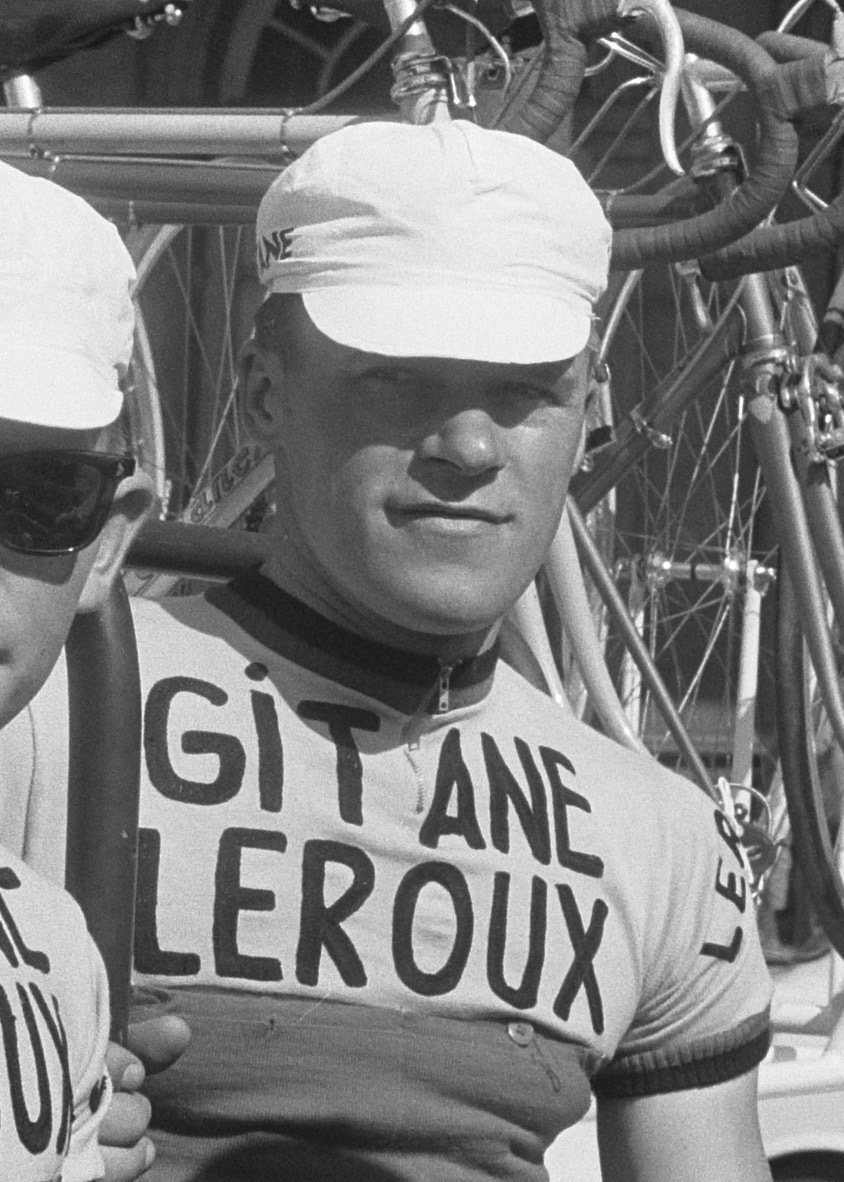
- Novak at the 1962 Tour de France

Personal information
- Full name: Anatole Novak
- Nickname: Le géant de la Mure
- Born: 12 February 1937 La Mure, France
- Died: 5 January 2022 (aged 84) Pierre-Châtel, France

Cycling career
- Sport: Cycling
- Discipline: Road
- Role: Rider

Major wins
- Grand Tours Tour de France 1 individual stage (1961)

Anatole Novak (12 February 1937 – 5 January 2022) was a French professional road bicycle racer.

== Career ==
Novak won a stage in the 1961 Tour de France, and was the Lanterne rouge (last finishing cyclist) in the 1964 Tour de France.

== Personal life and death ==
Novak died in Pierre-Châtel on 5 January 2022, at the age of 84.

== Major results ==
1956
France National Road Championship (Independents)
1959
Saint-Brieuc
1961
GP Vincennes
Riom
Tour de France:

Winner stage 4

Grand Prix du Parisien
1962
Gap
1964
Ambert
1965
Tour de l'Herault
1966
Saint-Vallier
Paris–Luxembourg
1967
Boucles des Hauts de Seine
1969
Toury
Sévignac
1970
Vuelta a España:

Winner stage 10
