= René Vanderveken =

Belgian cyclist

Personal information
- Born: 27 June 1937 (age 89)

Cycling career
- Sport: Cycling
- Role: Rider

René Vanderveken (born 27 June 1937) is a Belgian racing cyclist. He rode in the 1961 Tour de France.
