= Antoon van der Steen =

Dutch cyclist (1936–2019)

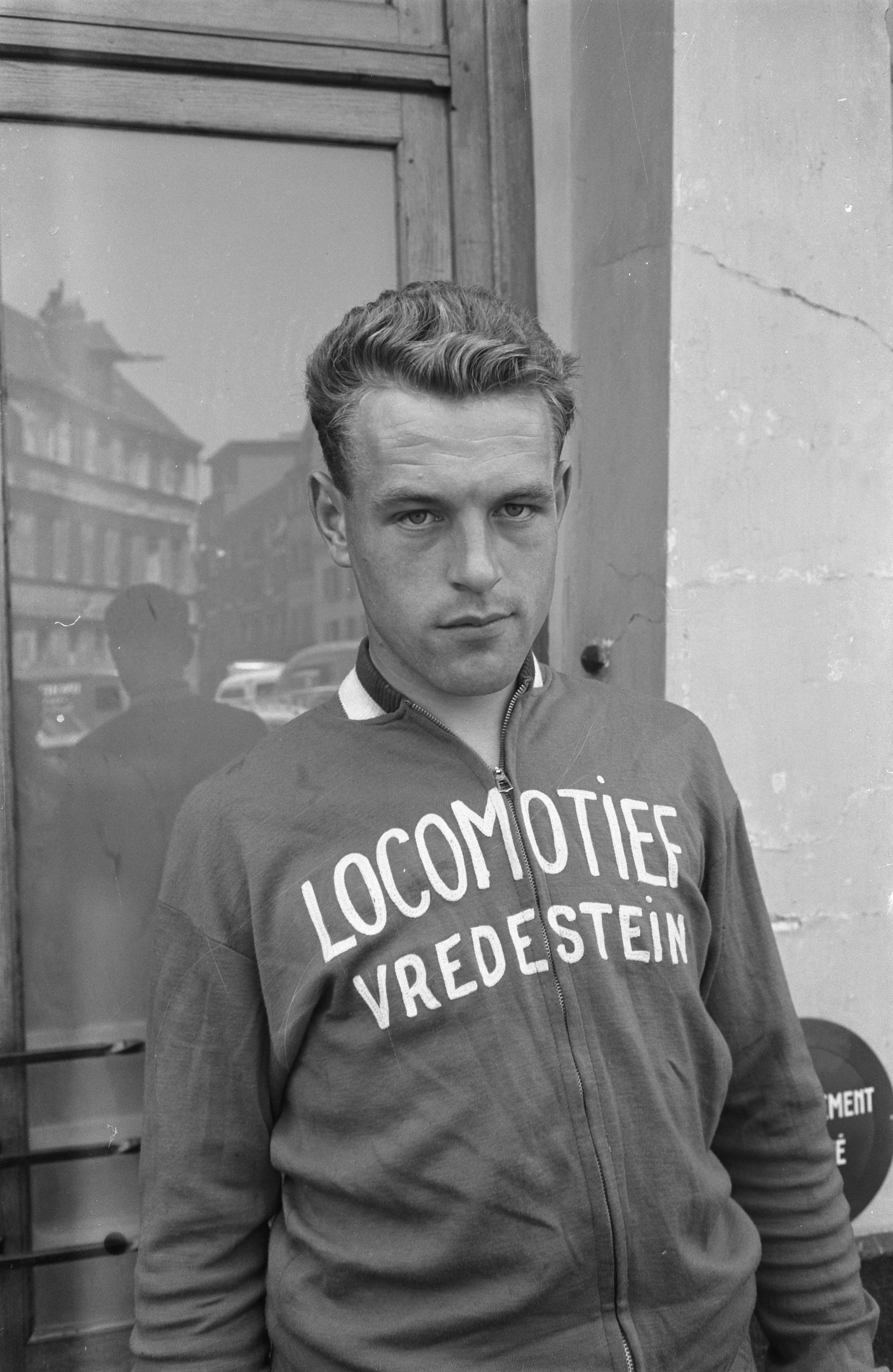

Personal information
- Born: 19 January 1936 Etten-Leur, Netherlands
- Died: 31 October 2019 (aged 83) Etten-Leur, Netherlands

Cycling career
- Sport: Cycling
- Discipline: Road
- Role: Rider

Professional team
- 1959–1962: Locomotief–Vredestein

Antoon van der Steen (19 January 1936 – 31 October 2019) was a Dutch racing cyclist. He rode in the 1961 Tour de France.

== Major results ==
1958
2nd Ronde van Overijssel
1959
3rd Overall Olympia's Tour
1960
1st Stage 2 Tour de Luxembourg
3rd Road race, National Road Championships
3rd Circuit des XI Villes
4th Overall Ronde van Nederland
4th GP Fichtel & Sachs
5th Overall Deutschland Tour
8th Gent–Wevelgem
1961
1st Stage 5a Ronde van Nederland
