= Labruyère, Oise =

Labruyère
- Commune
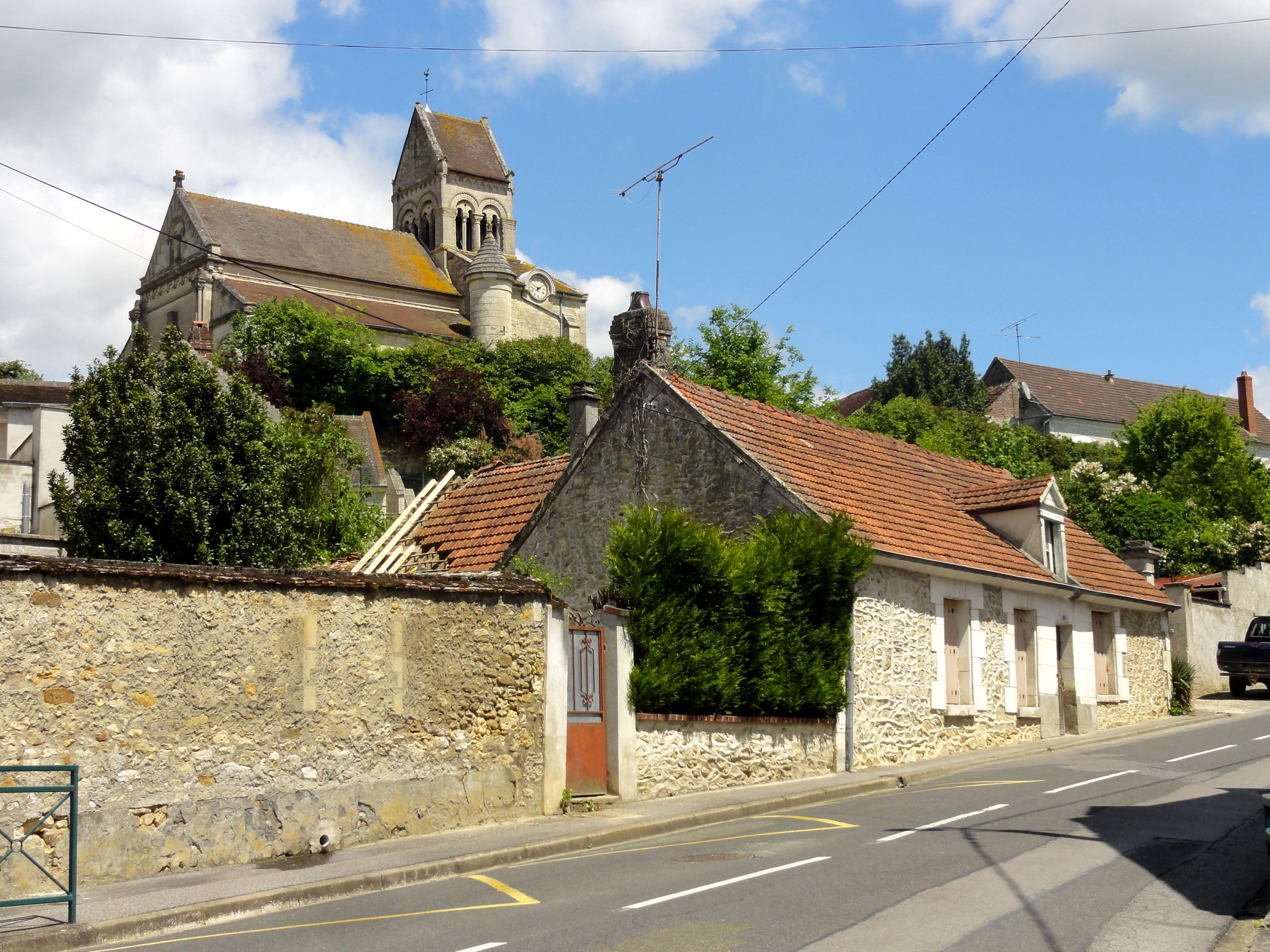
- The church and surroundings in Labruyère
- Location of Labruyère
- Location within France Location within Hauts-de-France
- Coordinates: 49°21′07″N 2°30′37″E
- Country: France
- Region: Hauts-de-France
- Department: Oise
- Arrondissement: Clermont
- Canton: Clermont
- Intercommunality: Liancourtois

Government
  - Mayor (2020–2026): Jean-François Croisille
- Area^{1}: 2.41 km^{2} (0.93 sq mi)
- Elevation: 185 m (607 ft)
- Highest elevation: 161 m (528 ft)
- Lowest elevation: 31 m (102 ft)
- Population (2023): 687
  - Density: 285/km^{2} (738/sq mi)
- Time zone: UTC+01:00 (CET)
  - Summer (DST): UTC+02:00 (CEST)
- INSEE/Postal code: 60332 /60140
- ^{1} French Land Register data, which excludes lakes, ponds, glaciers > 1 km^{2} (0.386 sq mi or 247 acres) and river estuaries.

Labruyère (French pronunciation: [labʁɥijɛʁ]) is a commune in the Oise department in northern France.

== See also ==
- Communes of the Oise department
