= Antoine Abate =

Italian cyclist (born 1938)

Personal information
- Born: 22 August 1938 (age 88) San Martino Valle Caudina, Kingdom of Italy

Cycling career
- Sport: Cycling
- Role: Rider

Antoine Abate (born 22 August 1938) is an Italian racing cyclist. He rode in the 1961 Tour de France.
