= Stéphane Lach =

French cyclist

Personal information
- Born: 10 June 1933 (age 93) Soissons, France

Cycling career
- Sport: Cycling
- Role: Rider

Stéphane Lach (born 10 June 1933) is a French former professional racing cyclist. He rode in four editions of the Tour de France.
