= Guido Carlesi =

Italian cyclist (1936–2024)

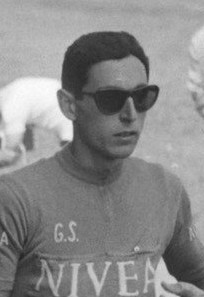
- Carlesi in 1956

Personal information
- Full name: Guido Carlesi
- Nickname: Coppino (the small Coppi)
- Born: 17 November 1936 Vicarello di Collesalvetti, Italy
- Died: 2 October 2024 (aged 87) Pisa, Italy

Cycling career
- Sport: Cycling
- Discipline: Road
- Role: Rider

Major wins
- 2nd place 1961 Tour de France

Guido Carlesi (7 November 1936 – 2 October 2024) was an Italian professional road bicycle racer. He was nicknamed Coppino because of his physical resemblance to Fausto Coppi.

== Life and career ==
Born in Vicarello di Collesalvetti, the son of a blacksmith and a housewife, Carlesi grew up in Titignano, Cascina, and at a young age, he started working as a carpenter. An amateur cyclist, he was noticed by Fiorenzo Magni in a local race, and in 1956 became professional with Magni's team Nivea-Fuchs; the same year he won the Giro delle Alpi Apuane. He had his breakout in 1958, when he won a stage at the Giro d'Italia and one stage at the Vuelta a España.

During his career, Carlesi won 35 races, including two stages in the Tour de France and seven stages in the Giro d'Italia. In 1961, he finished 2nd in the general classification of the 1961 Tour de France. In 1965, he moved to the Filotex team, in which he served as a domestique of Franco Bitossi.

After his retirement, Carlesi managed a furniture fabric company together with his sons Luca and Marco. He died in Pisa on 2 October 2024 at the age of 87.

== Major results ==
1956
Tour des Alpes Apuanes
1958
Cotignola
Giro d'Italia:

Winner stage 13

1959
Giro d'Italia:

8th place overall classification

1st Coppa Collecchio
1960
Giro della Provincia di Reggio Calabria
Modena
Trofeo Longines (with Silvano Ciampi, Emile Daems, Rolf Graf, and Alfredo Sabbadin)
Giro d'Italia:

6th place overall classification

1961
Baasrode
Bort-les-Orgues
GP Saint-Raphael
Tour de France:

Winner stages 11 and 15
2nd place overall classification

Giro d'Italia:

5th place overall classification

1962
Firenze
Giro di Toscana
Jeumont
Sassari - Cagliari
Giro d'Italia:

Winner stages 13 and 21
9th place overall classification

1963
Genève
GP Cemab
Giro d'Italia:

Winner stages 4 and 20
8th place overall classification

1965
Giro d'Italia:

Winner stages 2 and 11
