= Jean-Baptiste Claes =

Belgian cyclist

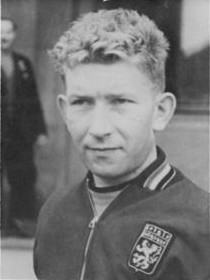

Personal information
- Born: 9 February 1937 (age 89)

Cycling career
- Sport: Cycling
- Role: Rider

Jean-Baptiste Claes (born 9 February 1937) is a Belgian racing cyclist. He rode in the 1961 Tour de France.
