= Giuseppe Tonucci =

Italian cyclist

Personal information
- Born: 9 March 1938 Fano, Italy
- Died: 11 October 1988 (aged 50) Pesaro, Italy

Cycling career
- Sport: Cycling

Giuseppe Tonucci (9 March 1938 – 11 October 1988) was an Italian cyclist. He competed in the individual road race at the 1960 Summer Olympics.
