= Imerio Massignan =

Italian cyclist (1937–2024)

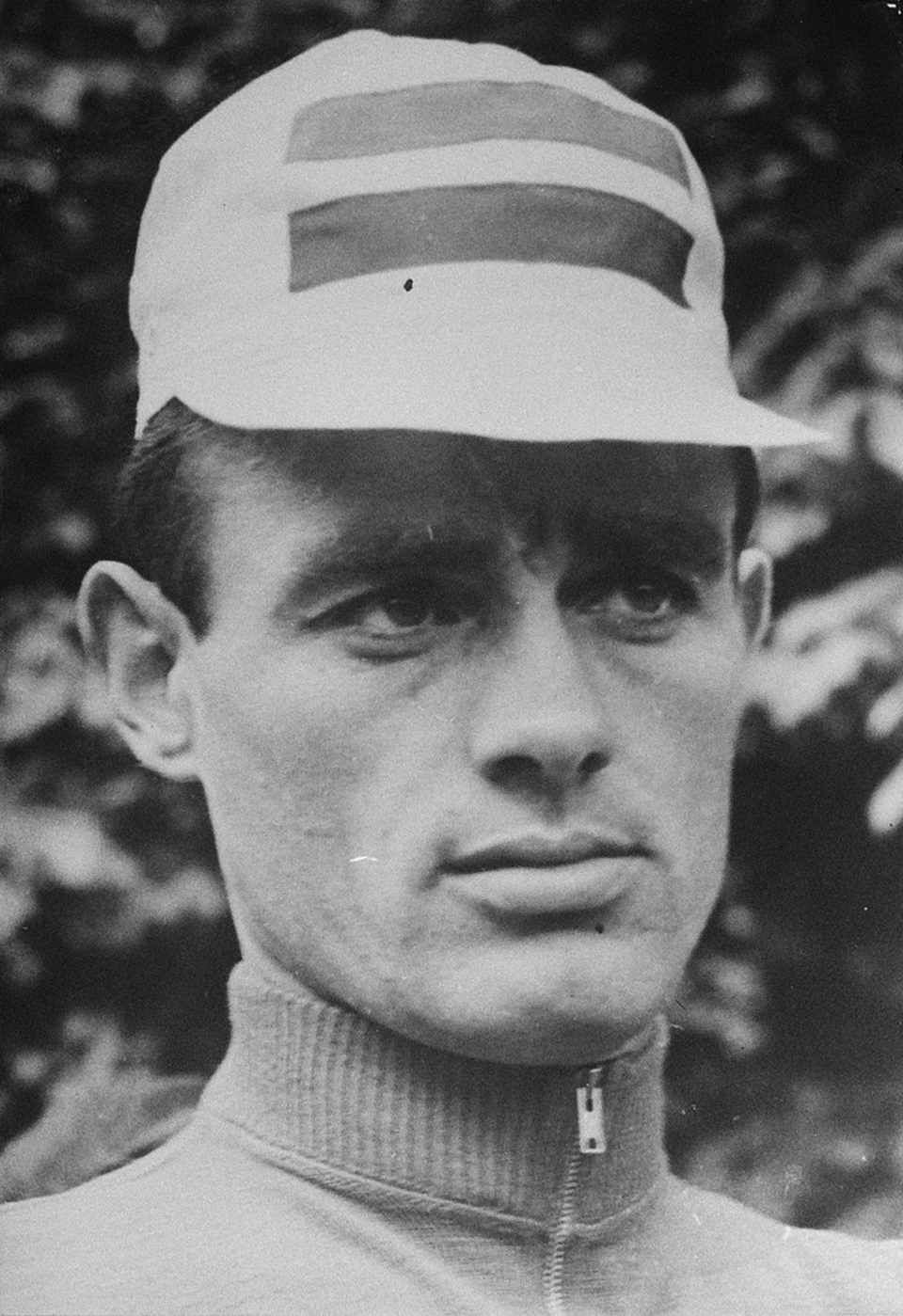
- Massignan in 1962

Personal information
- Full name: Imerio Massignan
- Born: 2 January 1937 Valmarana di Altavilla Vicentina, Italy
- Died: 3 May 2024 (aged 87) Novi Ligure, Italy

Cycling career
- Sport: Cycling
- Discipline: Road
- Role: Rider
- Rider type: Climber

Professional teams
- 1959–1963: Legnano–Pirelli
- 1964: Carpano
- 1965: Ignis
- 1966: Bianchi–Mobylette
- 1967: Salamini–Luxor TV
- 1968: Pepsi–Cola
- 1969–1970: G.B.C.

Major wins
- Grand Tours Tour de France Mountains classification (1960, 1961) 1 individual stage (1961)

Imerio Massignan (2 January 1937 – 3 May 2024) was an Italian professional road cyclist. A pure climber, he debuted as professional in the 1959 Giro d'Italia, finishing 5th overall. This was followed by a series of good placements in the subsequent editions, including a 2nd overall in the 1962 Giro behind Franco Balmamion.

At the Tour de France he won the Mountains classification in 1960 and 1961, when he also finished 4th overall. In the latter season he also obtained a second place in the Giro di Lombardia.

Massignan retired in 1970. He died in Novi Ligure on 3 May 2024, at the age of 87.

== Major results ==
1959
5th Overall Giro d'Italia
1960
4th Road race, UCI Road World Championships
4th Overall Giro d'Italia
8th Giro di Lombardia
10th Overall Tour de France

1st Mountains classification

1961
2nd Giro di Lombardia
3rd Overall Tour de Romandie
3rd GP d'Europe
4th Overall Tour de France

1st Mountains classification
1st Stage 16

4th Giro del Veneto
6th Overall Super Prestige Pernod
1962
2nd Overall Giro d'Italia
4th Coppa Sabatini
5th Giro dell'Appennino
6th Overall Super Prestige Pernod
7th Overall Tour de France
1963
3rd Giro di Toscana
7th Overall Giro d'Italia
1965
2nd Giro di Toscana
3rd Giro delle Tre Provincie
3rd Corsa Coppi
6th Overall Volta a Catalunya

1st Stage 3

9th Overall Giro d'Italia
1966
4th Giro dell'Emilia
