= Michel Van Aerde =

Belgian cyclist (1933–2020)

Personal information
- Full name: Michel Van Aerde
- Born: 2 October 1933 Zonnegem, Belgium
- Died: 11 August 2020 (aged 86) Burst, Belgium

Cycling career
- Sport: Cycling
- Discipline: Road
- Role: Rider

Major wins
- 2 stages Tour de France

Michel Van Aerde (2 October 1933 – 11 August 2020) was a Belgian professional road bicycle racer. Van Aerde became national champion in 1961, and won two stages in the Tour de France, in 1960 and 1961.

Van Aerde was born in Zonnegem, and died on 11 August 2020, aged 86.

== Major results ==
1954
Belgium National Militaries road race Championship
1955
Beveren-Waas
1956
Melsele
Stadsprijs Geraardsbergen
Eke
Schoonaarde
1957
Paris - Valenciennes
Stadsprijs Geraardsbergen
Drielandentrofee
Erpe
1958
Beervelde
Wervik
1959
København
Sint-Lievens-Esse
1960
Tour de France:

Winner stage 15

1961
Omloop der drie Proviniciën
Heule
Erembodegem
(Belgium) Belgian National Road Race Championships
Zonnegem
Tour de France:

Winner stage 12

1963
Burst
1964
Erpe
