= Armando Pellegrini =

Italian cyclist (1933–2023)

Personal information
- Born: 3 June 1933 Bedulita, Italy
- Died: 25 August 2023 (aged 90) Ponteranica, Italy

Cycling career
- Sport: Cycling
- Role: Rider

Armando Pellegrini (3 June 1933 – 25 August 2023) was an Italian track and racing cyclist.

== Life and career ==
Born in Bedulita, Pellegrini turned professional in 1957, and during his career he won several races, including two stages of the Giro d'Italia, in 1959 and in 1962. As a track cyclist, he competed with the national team in the team pursuit specialty. He also competed in the keirin specialty, being a two-time Italian national champion. Pellegrini died on 25 August 2023, at the age of 90.
