= 1966 Tour de France, Stage 1 to Stage 12 =

Cycling race stages

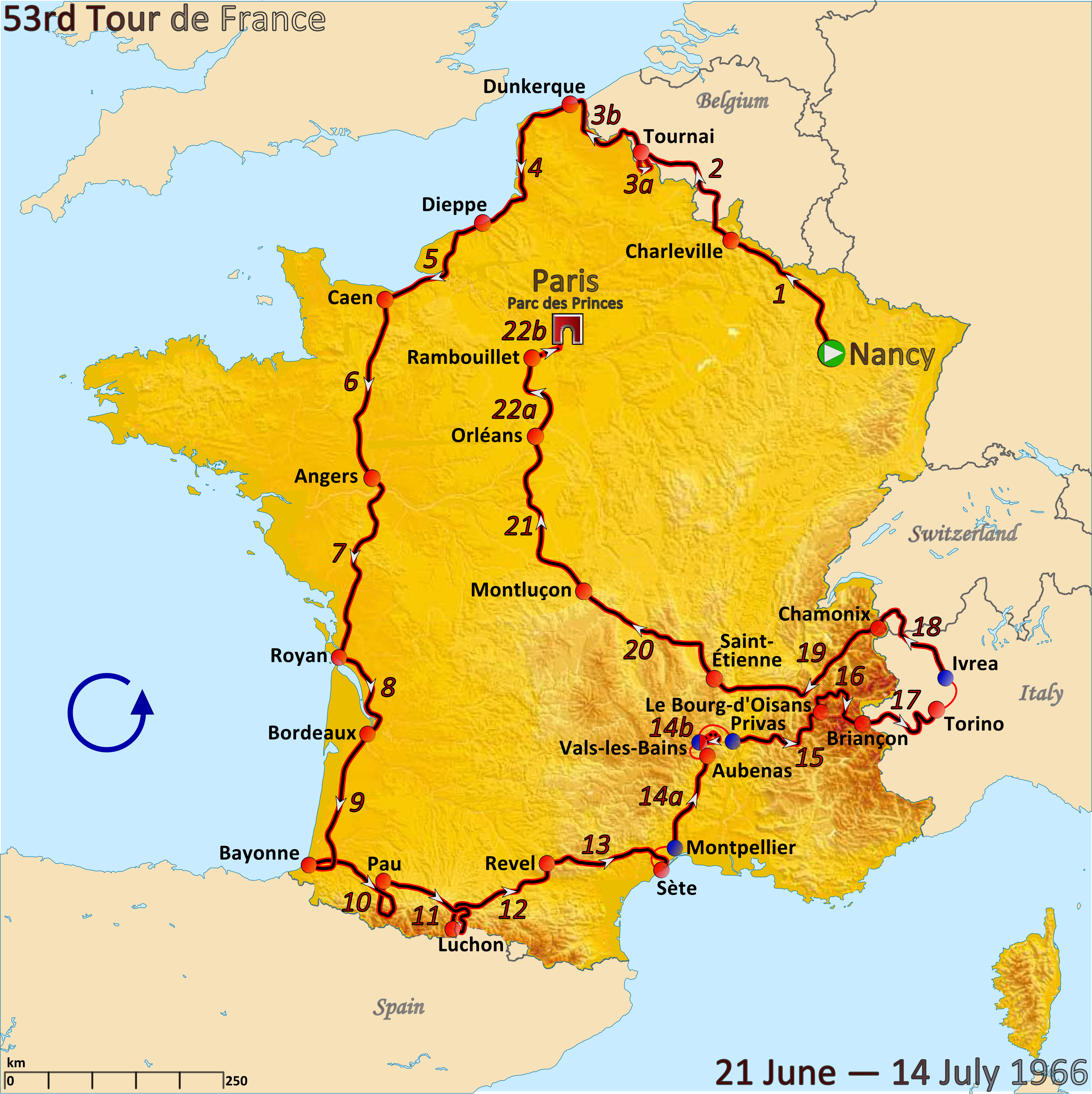
Route of the 1966 Tour de France

The 1966 Tour de France was the 53rd edition of Tour de France, one of cycling's Grand Tours. The Tour began in Nancy with a flat stage on 21 June and Stage 12 occurred on 3 July with a mountainous stage to Revel. The race finished in Paris on 14 July.

== Stage 1 ==
21 June 1966 - Nancy to Charleville, 209 km (129.9 mi)

Stage 1 result and General Classification after Stage 1

| | Rider | Team | Time |
|---|---|---|---|
| 1 | Rudi Altig (FRG) | Molteni | 4h 52' 56" |
| 2 | Willy Planckaert (BEL) | Roméo–Smith's | + 47" |
| 3 | Georges Vandenberghe (BEL) | Roméo–Smith's | s.t. |
| 4 | Rik Van Looy (BEL) | Solo–Superia | s.t. |
| 5 | Jo de Roo (NED) | Televizier–Batavus | s.t. |
| 6 | Guido Reybrouck (BEL) | Roméo–Smith's | s.t. |
| 7 | Georges Van Coningsloo (BEL) | Peugeot–BP–Michelin | s.t. |
| 8 | Gerben Karstens (NED) | Televizier–Batavus | s.t. |
| 9 | Jan Janssen (NED) | Pelforth–Sauvage–Lejeune | s.t. |
| 10 | Herman Van Springel (BEL) | Dr. Mann–Grundig | s.t. |

== Stage 2 ==
22 June 1966 - Charleville to Tournai, 198 km (123.0 mi)

Stage 2 result

| Rank | Rider | Team | Time |
|---|---|---|---|
| 1 | Guido Reybrouck (BEL) | Roméo–Smith's | 4h 46' 21" |
| 2 | Jan Janssen (NED) | Pelforth–Sauvage–Lejeune | s.t. |
| 3 | Edward Sels (BEL) | Solo–Superia | s.t. |
| 4 | Arie den Hartog (NED) | Ford France–Hutchinson | s.t. |
| 5 | Huub Harings (NED) | Televizier–Batavus | s.t. |
| 6 | Tommaso de Pra (ITA) | Molteni | s.t. |
| 7 | Walter Boucquet (BEL) | Dr. Mann–Grundig | + 7" |
| 8 | Frans Brands (BEL) | Roméo–Smith's | + 8" |
| 9 | Willy Planckaert (BEL) | Roméo–Smith's | + 11" |
| 10 | Jos Huysmans (BEL) | Dr. Mann–Grundig | s.t. |

General classification after stage 2

| Rank | Rider | Team | Time |
|---|---|---|---|
| 1 | Rudi Altig (FRG) | Molteni | 9h 39' 28" |
| 2 | Guido Reybrouck (BEL) | Roméo–Smith's | + 36" |
| 3 | Jan Janssen (NED) | Pelforth–Sauvage–Lejeune | s.t. |
| 4 | Edward Sels (BEL) | Solo–Superia | s.t. |
| 5 | Arie den Hartog (NED) | Ford France–Hutchinson | s.t. |
| 6 | Tommaso de Pra (ITA) | Molteni | s.t. |
| 7 | Huub Harings (NED) | Televizier–Batavus | s.t. |
| 8 | Walter Boucquet (BEL) | Dr. Mann–Grundig | + 43" |
| 9 | Frans Brands (BEL) | Roméo–Smith's | + 44" |
| 10 | Willy Planckaert (BEL) | Roméo–Smith's | + 47" |

== Stage 3a ==
23 June 1966 - Tournai, 21 km (13 mi) (TTT)

Stage 3a result

| Rank | Team | Time |
|---|---|---|
| 1 | Televizier–Batavus | 2h 19' 30" |
| 2 | Roméo–Smith's | + 15" |
| 3 | Pelforth–Sauvage–Lejeune | + 21" |
| 4 | Dr. Mann–Grundig | + 1' 45" |
| 5 | Solo–Superia | + 2' 45" |
| 6 | Kas–Kaskol | + 3' 40" |
| 7 | Ford France–Hutchinson | + 3' 55" |
| 8 | Molteni | + 4' 20" |
| 9 | Fagor | + 5' 00" |
| 10 | Mercier–BP–Hutchinson | + 5' 55" |

== Stage 3b ==
23 June 1966 - Tournai to Dunkirk, 131 km (81 mi)

Stage 3b result

| Rank | Rider | Team | Time |
|---|---|---|---|
| 1 | Gerben Karstens (NED) | Televizier–Batavus | 3h 26' 46" |
| 2 | Jozef Boons (BEL) | Dr. Mann–Grundig | s.t. |
| 3 | Willy Planckaert (BEL) | Roméo–Smith's | + 1" |
| 4 | Rik Van Looy (BEL) | Solo–Superia | s.t. |
| 5 | Edward Sels (BEL) | Solo–Superia | s.t. |
| 6 | Georges Vandenberghe (BEL) | Roméo–Smith's | s.t. |
| 7 | Jo de Roo (NED) | Televizier–Batavus | s.t. |
| 8 | Jos Huysmans (BEL) | Dr. Mann–Grundig | s.t. |
| 9 | Henk Nijdam (NED) | Televizier–Batavus | s.t. |
| 10 | Georges Van Coningsloo (BEL) | Peugeot–BP–Michelin | s.t. |

General classification after stage 3b

| Rank | Rider | Team | Time |
|---|---|---|---|
| 1 | Rudi Altig (FRG) | Molteni | 13h 06' 15" |
| 2 | Edward Sels (BEL) | Solo–Superia | + 36" |
| 3 | Guido Reybrouck (BEL) | Roméo–Smith's | s.t. |
| 4 | Jan Janssen (NED) | Pelforth–Sauvage–Lejeune | s.t. |
| 5 | Arie den Hartog (NED) | Ford France–Hutchinson | s.t. |
| 6 | Tommaso de Pra (ITA) | Molteni | s.t. |
| 7 | Huub Harings (NED) | Televizier–Batavus | s.t. |
| 8 | Walter Boucquet (BEL) | Dr. Mann–Grundig | + 43" |
| 9 | Frans Brands (BEL) | Roméo–Smith's | + 44" |
| 10 | Gerben Karstens (NED) | Televizier–Batavus | + 46" |

== Stage 4 ==
24 June 1966 - Dunkirk to Dieppe, 205 km (127 mi)

Stage 4 result

| Rank | Rider | Team | Time |
|---|---|---|---|
| 1 | Willy Planckaert (BEL) | Roméo–Smith's | 5h 58' 45" |
| 2 | Rik Van Looy (BEL) | Solo–Superia | s.t. |
| 3 | Guido Reybrouck (BEL) | Roméo–Smith's | s.t. |
| 4 | Gerben Karstens (NED) | Televizier–Batavus | s.t. |
| 5 | Martin Van Den Bossche (BEL) | Roméo–Smith's | s.t. |
| 6 | Willy Vannitsen (BEL) | Dr. Mann–Grundig | s.t. |
| 7 | Herman Vrancken (BEL) | Dr. Mann–Grundig | s.t. |
| 8 | Jo de Roo (NED) | Televizier–Batavus | s.t. |
| 9 | Jan Janssen (NED) | Pelforth–Sauvage–Lejeune | s.t. |
| 10 | Jos Huysmans (BEL) | Dr. Mann–Grundig | s.t. |

General classification after stage 4

| Rank | Rider | Team | Time |
|---|---|---|---|
| 1 | Rudi Altig (FRG) | Molteni | 19h 05' 00" |
| 2 | Guido Reybrouck (BEL) | Roméo–Smith's | + 36" |
| 3 | Edward Sels (BEL) | Solo–Superia | s.t. |
| 4 | Jan Janssen (NED) | Pelforth–Sauvage–Lejeune | s.t. |
| 5 | Arie den Hartog (NED) | Ford France–Hutchinson | s.t. |
| 6 | Huub Harings (NED) | Televizier–Batavus | s.t. |
| 7 | Tommaso de Pra (ITA) | Molteni | s.t. |
| 8 | Walter Boucquet (BEL) | Dr. Mann–Grundig | + 43" |
| 9 | Frans Brands (BEL) | Roméo–Smith's | + 44" |
| 10 | Gerben Karstens (NED) | Televizier–Batavus | + 46" |

== Stage 5 ==
25 June 1966 - Dieppe to Caen, 178 km (111 mi)

Stage 5 result

| Rank | Rider | Team | Time |
|---|---|---|---|
| 1 | Franco Bitossi (ITA) | Filotex | 4h 55' 50" |
| 2 | Edward Sels (BEL) | Solo–Superia | + 1" |
| 3 | Willy Planckaert (BEL) | Roméo–Smith's | s.t. |
| 4 | Guido Reybrouck (BEL) | Roméo–Smith's | s.t. |
| 5 | Gerben Karstens (NED) | Televizier–Batavus | s.t. |
| 6 | Rik Van Looy (BEL) | Solo–Superia | s.t. |
| 7 | Georges Vandenberghe (BEL) | Roméo–Smith's | s.t. |
| 8 | Jan Janssen (NED) | Pelforth–Sauvage–Lejeune | s.t. |
| 9 | Georges Van Coningsloo (BEL) | Peugeot–BP–Michelin | s.t. |
| 10 | Jos Huysmans (BEL) | Dr. Mann–Grundig | s.t. |

General classification after stage 5

| Rank | Rider | Team | Time |
|---|---|---|---|
| 1 | Rudi Altig (FRG) | Molteni | 24h 00' 51" |
| 2 | Guido Reybrouck (BEL) | Roméo–Smith's | + 36" |
| 3 | Edward Sels (BEL) | Solo–Superia | s.t. |
| 4 | Jan Janssen (NED) | Pelforth–Sauvage–Lejeune | s.t. |
| 5 | Arie den Hartog (NED) | Ford France–Hutchinson | s.t. |
| 6 | Huub Harings (NED) | Televizier–Batavus | s.t. |
| 7 | Tommaso de Pra (ITA) | Molteni | s.t. |
| 8 | Frans Brands (BEL) | Roméo–Smith's | + 44" |
| 9 | Gerben Karstens (NED) | Televizier–Batavus | + 46" |
| 10 | Willy Planckaert (BEL) | Roméo–Smith's | + 47" |

== Stage 6 ==
26 June 1966 - Caen to Angers, 217 km (135 mi)

Stage 6 result

| Rank | Rider | Team | Time |
|---|---|---|---|
| 1 | Edward Sels (BEL) | Solo–Superia | 5h 21' 43" |
| 2 | Rik Van Looy (BEL) | Solo–Superia | s.t. |
| 3 | Jos Huysmans (BEL) | Dr. Mann–Grundig | s.t. |
| 4 | Walter Boucquet (BEL) | Dr. Mann–Grundig | s.t. |
| 5 | Jos van der Vleuten (NED) | Televizier–Batavus | s.t. |
| 6 | Jan Janssen (NED) | Pelforth–Sauvage–Lejeune | s.t. |
| 7 | Huub Zilverberg (NED) | Televizier–Batavus | s.t. |
| 8 | Herman Vrancken (BEL) | Dr. Mann–Grundig | s.t. |
| 9 | Gerben Karstens (NED) | Televizier–Batavus | s.t. |
| 10 | Georges Vandenberghe (BEL) | Roméo–Smith's | s.t. |

General classification after stage 6

| Rank | Rider | Team | Time |
|---|---|---|---|
| 1 | Rudi Altig (FRG) | Molteni | 29h 22' 34" |
| 2 | Edward Sels (BEL) | Solo–Superia | + 36" |
| 3 | Guido Reybrouck (BEL) | Roméo–Smith's | s.t. |
| 4 | Jan Janssen (NED) | Pelforth–Sauvage–Lejeune | s.t. |
| 5 | Huub Harings (NED) | Televizier–Batavus | s.t. |
| 6 | Arie den Hartog (NED) | Ford France–Hutchinson | s.t. |
| 7 | Tommaso de Pra (ITA) | Molteni | s.t. |
| 8 | Frans Brands (BEL) | Roméo–Smith's | + 44" |
| 9 | Gerben Karstens (NED) | Televizier–Batavus | + 46" |
| 10 | Willy Planckaert (BEL) | Roméo–Smith's | + 47" |

== Stage 7 ==
27 June 1966 - Angers to Royan, 252 km (157 mi)

Stage 7 result

| Rank | Rider | Team | Time |
|---|---|---|---|
| 1 | Albert Van Vlierberghe (BEL) | Roméo–Smith's | 7h 11' 21" |
| 2 | Walter Boucquet (BEL) | Dr. Mann–Grundig | s.t. |
| 3 | Jos van der Vleuten (NED) | Televizier–Batavus | s.t. |
| 4 | Rudi Altig (FRG) | Molteni | s.t. |
| 5 | Willy Planckaert (BEL) | Roméo–Smith's | + 16" |
| 6 | Gerben Karstens (NED) | Televizier–Batavus | s.t. |
| 7 | Rik Van Looy (BEL) | Solo–Superia | s.t. |
| 8 | Edward Sels (BEL) | Solo–Superia | s.t. |
| 9 | Guido Neri (ITA) | Molteni | s.t. |
| 10 | Roger Swerts (BEL) | Mercier–BP–Hutchinson | s.t. |

General classification after stage 7

| Rank | Rider | Team | Time |
|---|---|---|---|
| 1 | Rudi Altig (FRG) | Molteni | 36h 33' 55" |
| 2 | Albert Van Vlierberghe (BEL) | Roméo–Smith's | + 47" |
| 3 | Edward Sels (BEL) | Solo–Superia | + 52" |
| 4 | Guido Reybrouck (BEL) | Roméo–Smith's | s.t. |
| 5 | Jan Janssen (NED) | Pelforth–Sauvage–Lejeune | s.t. |
| 6 | Huub Harings (NED) | Televizier–Batavus | s.t. |
| 7 | Arie den Hartog (NED) | Ford France–Hutchinson | s.t. |
| 8 | Tommaso de Pra (ITA) | Molteni | s.t. |
| 9 | Frans Brands (BEL) | Roméo–Smith's | + 1' 00" |
| 10 | Gerben Karstens (NED) | Televizier–Batavus | + 1' 02" |

== Stage 8 ==
28 June 1966 - Royan to Bordeaux, 138 km (86 mi)

Stage 8 result

| Rank | Rider | Team | Time |
|---|---|---|---|
| 1 | Willy Planckaert (BEL) | Roméo–Smith's | 2h 58' 26" |
| 2 | Gerben Karstens (NED) | Televizier–Batavus | s.t. |
| 3 | Jan Janssen (NED) | Pelforth–Sauvage–Lejeune | s.t. |
| 4 | Rik Van Looy (BEL) | Solo–Superia | s.t. |
| 5 | Edward Sels (BEL) | Solo–Superia | s.t. |
| 6 | Jo de Roo (NED) | Televizier–Batavus | s.t. |
| 7 | Guido Reybrouck (BEL) | Roméo–Smith's | s.t. |
| 8 | Michel Grain (FRA) | Ford France–Hutchinson | s.t. |
| 9 | Henk Nijdam (NED) | Televizier–Batavus | s.t. |
| 10 | Maurice Benet (FRA) | Kamomé–Dilecta–Dunlop | s.t. |

General classification after stage 8

| Rank | Rider | Team | Time |
|---|---|---|---|
| 1 | Rudi Altig (FRG) | Molteni | 39h 32' 21" |
| 2 | Albert Van Vlierberghe (BEL) | Roméo–Smith's | + 47" |
| 3 | Edward Sels (BEL) | Solo–Superia | + 52" |
| 4 | Guido Reybrouck (BEL) | Roméo–Smith's | s.t. |
| 5 | Jan Janssen (NED) | Pelforth–Sauvage–Lejeune | s.t. |
| 6 | Huub Harings (NED) | Televizier–Batavus | s.t. |
| 7 | Arie den Hartog (NED) | Ford France–Hutchinson | s.t. |
| 8 | Tommaso de Pra (ITA) | Molteni | s.t. |
| 9 | Frans Brands (BEL) | Roméo–Smith's | + 1' 00" |
| 10 | Gerben Karstens (NED) | Televizier–Batavus | + 1' 02" |

== Stage 9 ==
29 June 1966 - Bordeaux to Bayonne, 201 km (125 mi)

Stage 9 result

| Rank | Rider | Team | Time |
|---|---|---|---|
| 1 | Gerben Karstens (NED) | Televizier–Batavus | 5h 15' 58" |
| 2 | Willy Planckaert (BEL) | Roméo–Smith's | s.t. |
| 3 | Jan Janssen (NED) | Pelforth–Sauvage–Lejeune | s.t. |
| 4 | Rik Van Looy (BEL) | Solo–Superia | s.t. |
| 5 | Edward Sels (BEL) | Solo–Superia | s.t. |
| 6 | Michel Grain (FRA) | Ford France–Hutchinson | s.t. |
| 7 | Guido Reybrouck (BEL) | Roméo–Smith's | s.t. |
| 8 | Georges Vandenberghe (BEL) | Roméo–Smith's | s.t. |
| 9 | Johny Schleck (LUX) | Pelforth–Sauvage–Lejeune | s.t. |
| 10 | Pierre Beuffeuil (FRA) | Kamomé–Dilecta–Dunlop | s.t. |

General classification after stage 9

| Rank | Rider | Team | Time |
|---|---|---|---|
| 1 | Rudi Altig (FRG) | Molteni | 44h 48' 19" |
| 2 | Albert Van Vlierberghe (BEL) | Roméo–Smith's | + 47" |
| 3 | Edward Sels (BEL) | Solo–Superia | + 52" |
| 4 | Guido Reybrouck (BEL) | Roméo–Smith's | s.t. |
| 5 | Jan Janssen (NED) | Pelforth–Sauvage–Lejeune | s.t. |
| 6 | Huub Harings (NED) | Televizier–Batavus | s.t. |
| 7 | Tommaso de Pra (ITA) | Molteni | s.t. |
| 8 | Arie den Hartog (NED) | Ford France–Hutchinson | s.t. |
| 9 | Frans Brands (BEL) | Roméo–Smith's | + 1' 00" |
| 10 | Gerben Karstens (NED) | Televizier–Batavus | + 1' 02" |

== Stage 10 ==
30 June 1966 - Bayonne to Pau, 234 km (145 mi)

Stage 10 result

| Rank | Rider | Team | Time |
|---|---|---|---|
| 1 | Tommaso de Pra (ITA) | Molteni | 6h 37' 00" |
| 2 | Willy In ’t Ven (BEL) | Dr. Mann–Grundig | + 1" |
| 3 | Jan Janssen (NED) | Pelforth–Sauvage–Lejeune | + 2' 03" |
| 4 | Domingo Perurena (ESP) | Fagor | s.t. |
| 5 | Cees Haast (NED) | Televizier–Batavus | s.t. |
| 6 | José Antonio Momeñe (ESP) | Kas–Kaskol | s.t. |
| 7 | Jos Huysmans (BEL) | Dr. Mann–Grundig | s.t. |
| 8 | Henri De Wolf (BEL) | Solo–Superia | s.t. |
| 9 | Guido Marcello Mugnaini (ITA) | Filotex | s.t. |
| 10 | Lucien Aimar (FRA) | Ford France–Hutchinson | s.t. |

General classification after stage 10

| Rank | Rider | Team | Time |
|---|---|---|---|
| 1 | Tommaso de Pra (ITA) | Molteni | 51h 26' 11" |
| 2 | Jan Janssen (NED) | Pelforth–Sauvage–Lejeune | + 2' 03" |
| 3 | Jos Huysmans (BEL) | Dr. Mann–Grundig | + 2' 14" |
| 4 | José Antonio Momeñe (ESP) | Kas–Kaskol | s.t. |
| 5 | Jean-Claude Lebaube (FRA) | Kamomé–Dilecta–Dunlop | s.t. |
| 6 | Karl-Heinz Kunde (FRG) | Peugeot–BP–Michelin | s.t. |
| 7 | Lucien Aimar (FRA) | Ford France–Hutchinson | s.t. |
| 8 | Guido De Rosso (ITA) | Molteni | s.t. |
| 9 | Henri De Wolf (BEL) | Solo–Superia | + 2' 59" |
| 10 | Domingo Perurena (ESP) | Fagor | + 3' 21" |

== Stage 11 ==
1 July 1966 - Pau to Luchon, 188 km (117 mi)

Stage 11 result

| Rank | Rider | Team | Time |
|---|---|---|---|
| 1 | Guido Marcello Mugnaini (ITA) | Filotex | 5h 54' 42" |
| 2 | Rudi Altig (FRG) | Molteni | + 48" |
| 3 | Jacques Anquetil (FRA) | Ford France–Hutchinson | s.t. |
| 4 | Jean-Claude Lebaube (FRA) | Kamomé–Dilecta–Dunlop | + 50" |
| 5 | Karl-Heinz Kunde (FRG) | Peugeot–BP–Michelin | s.t. |
| 6 | Luis Pedro Santamarina (ESP) | Fagor | s.t. |
| 7 | Raymond Poulidor (FRA) | Mercier–BP–Hutchinson | s.t. |
| 8 | André Zimmermann (FRA) | Peugeot–BP–Michelin | s.t. |
| 9 | Francisco Gabica (ESP) | Kas–Kaskol | s.t. |
| 10 | Ferdinand Bracke (BEL) | Peugeot–BP–Michelin | s.t. |

General classification after stage 11

| Rank | Rider | Team | Time |
|---|---|---|---|
| 1 | Jean-Claude Lebaube (FRA) | Kamomé–Dilecta–Dunlop | 57h 23' 57" |
| 2 | Karl-Heinz Kunde (FRG) | Peugeot–BP–Michelin | s.t. |
| 3 | Guido Marcello Mugnaini (ITA) | Filotex | + 17" |
| 4 | Jan Janssen (NED) | Pelforth–Sauvage–Lejeune | + 1' 06" |
| 5 | Lucien Aimar (FRA) | Ford France–Hutchinson | + 1' 56" |
| 6 | Raymond Delisle (FRA) | Peugeot–BP–Michelin | + 2' 24" |
| 7 | Guido De Rosso (ITA) | Molteni | + 2' 34" |
| 8 | José Antonio Momeñe (ESP) | Kas–Kaskol | + 3' 28" |
| 9 | Tommaso de Pra (ITA) | Molteni | + 3' 54" |
| 10 | Domingo Perurena (ESP) | Fagor | + 4' 35" |

== Rest Day 1 ==
2 July 1966 - Luchon

== Stage 12 ==
3 July 1966 - Luchon to Revel, 219 km (136 mi)

Stage 12 result

| Rank | Rider | Team | Time |
|---|---|---|---|
| 1 | Rudi Altig (FRG) | Molteni | 6h 32' 15" |
| 2 | Tom Simpson (GBR) | Peugeot–BP–Michelin | + 1" |
| 3 | Jozef Spruyt (BEL) | Mercier–BP–Hutchinson | + 2" |
| 4 | Michel Grain (FRA) | Ford France–Hutchinson | + 4" |
| 5 | Edward Sels (BEL) | Solo–Superia | + 5" |
| 6 | Jan Janssen (NED) | Pelforth–Sauvage–Lejeune | s.t. |
| 7 | Armand Desmet (BEL) | Solo–Superia | s.t. |
| 8 | Georges Vandenberghe (BEL) | Roméo–Smith's | s.t. |
| 9 | Gerben Karstens (NED) | Televizier–Batavus | s.t. |
| 10 | Jos Huysmans (BEL) | Dr. Mann–Grundig | s.t. |

General classification after stage 12

| Rank | Rider | Team | Time |
|---|---|---|---|
| 1 | Karl-Heinz Kunde (FRG) | Peugeot–BP–Michelin | 63h 56' 17" |
| 2 | Jean-Claude Lebaube (FRA) | Kamomé–Dilecta–Dunlop | + 27" |
| 3 | Guido Marcello Mugnaini (ITA) | Filotex | + 44" |
| 4 | Jan Janssen (NED) | Pelforth–Sauvage–Lejeune | + 1' 06" |
| 5 | Lucien Aimar (FRA) | Ford France–Hutchinson | + 1' 56" |
| 6 | Raymond Delisle (FRA) | Peugeot–BP–Michelin | + 2' 24" |
| 7 | Guido De Rosso (ITA) | Molteni | + 2' 34" |
| 8 | José Antonio Momeñe (ESP) | Kas–Kaskol | + 3' 28" |
| 9 | Tommaso de Pra (ITA) | Molteni | + 3' 54" |
| 10 | Cees Haast (NED) | Televizier–Batavus | + 4' 35" |
