= 1966 Tour de France, Stage 13 to Stage 22b =

Cycling race stages

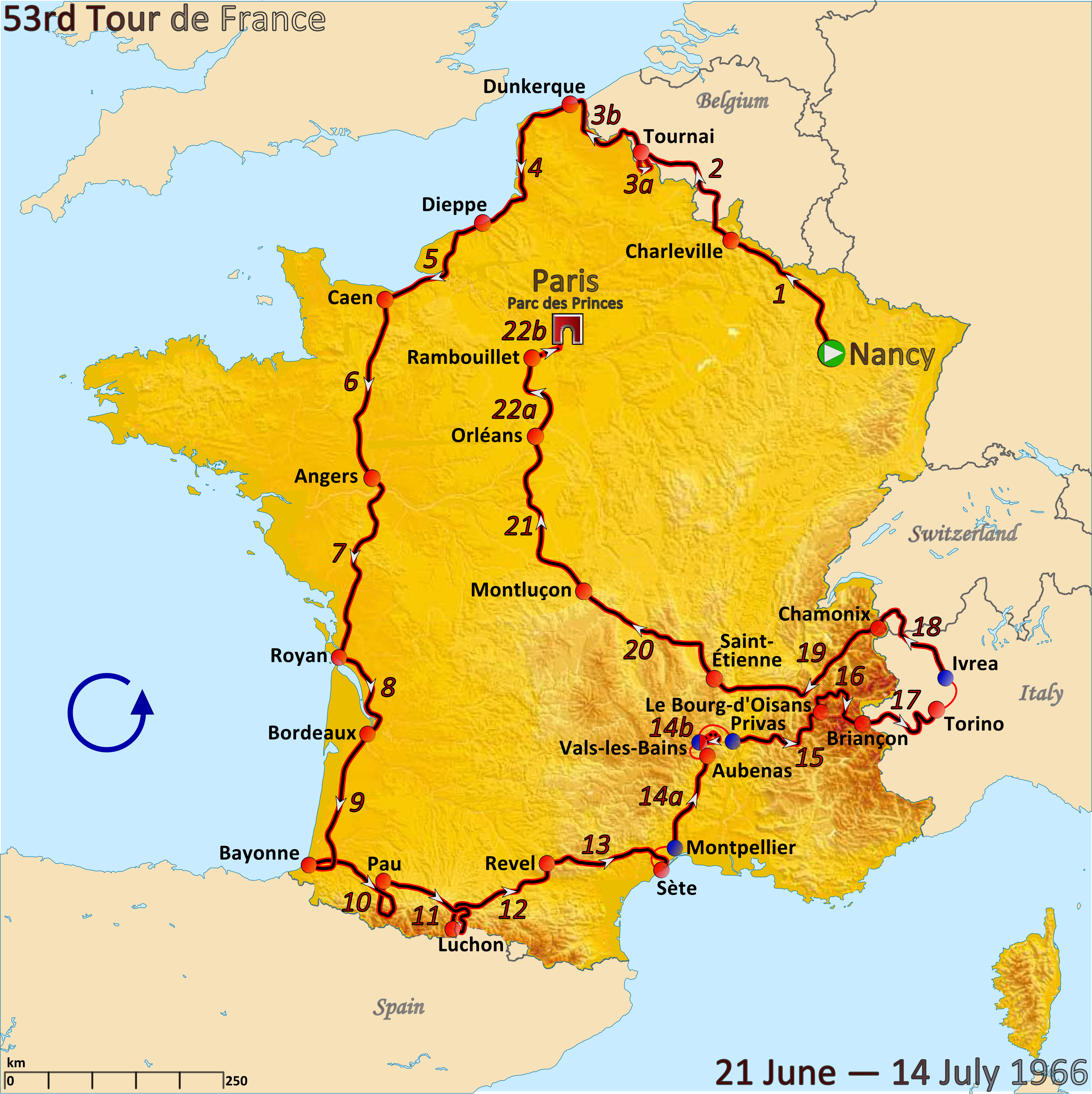
Route of the 1966 Tour de France

The 1966 Tour de France was the 53rd edition of Tour de France, one of cycling's Grand Tours. The Tour began in Nancy with a flat stage on 21 June and Stage 13 occurred on 4 July with a flat stage from Revel. The race finished in Paris on 14 July.

== Stage 13 ==
4 July 1966 - Revel to Sète, 191 km (118.7 mi)

Stage 13 result

Rank	Rider	Team	Time
1	Georges Vandenberghe (BEL)	Roméo–Smith's	5h 46' 20"
2	Tom Simpson (GBR)	Peugeot–BP–Michelin	s.t.
3	Guido De Rosso (ITA)	Molteni	s.t.
4	Willy Planckaert (BEL)	Roméo–Smith's	+ 19"
5	Georges Van Coningsloo (BEL)	Peugeot–BP–Michelin	s.t.
6	Guido Reybrouck (BEL)	Roméo–Smith's	s.t.
7	Edward Sels (BEL)	Solo–Superia	s.t.
8	Maurice Benet (FRA)	Kamomé–Dilecta–Dunlop	s.t.
9	Henk Nijdam (NED)	Televizier–Batavus	s.t.
10	Gerben Karstens (NED)	Televizier–Batavus	s.t.

General classification after stage 13

Rank	Rider	Team	Time
1	Karl-Heinz Kunde (FRG)	Peugeot–BP–Michelin	69h 42' 56"
2	Jean-Claude Lebaube (FRA)	Kamomé–Dilecta–Dunlop	+ 27"
3	Guido Marcello Mugnaini (ITA)	Filotex	+ 44"
4	Jan Janssen (NED)	Pelforth–Sauvage–Lejeune	+ 1' 06"
5	Lucien Aimar (FRA)	Ford France–Hutchinson	+ 1' 56"
6	Guido De Rosso (ITA)	Molteni	+ 2' 15"
7	Raymond Delisle (FRA)	Peugeot–BP–Michelin	+ 2' 24"
8	José Antonio Momeñe (ESP)	Kas–Kaskol	+ 3' 28"
9	Tommaso de Pra (ITA)	Molteni	+ 3' 54"
10	Cees Haast (NED)	Televizier–Batavus	+ 4' 35"

== Stage 14a ==
5 July 1966 - Montpellier to Aubenas, 144 km (89 mi)

Stage 14a result

Rank	Rider	Team	Time
1	Jo de Roo (NED)	Televizier–Batavus	3h 23' 54"
2	Lucien Aimar (FRA)	Ford France–Hutchinson	+ 4"
3	Maurice Benet (FRA)	Kamomé–Dilecta–Dunlop	s.t.
4	Jozef Spruyt (BEL)	Mercier–BP–Hutchinson	+ 7"
5	Guido Carlesi (ITA)	Filotex	s.t.
6	Arie den Hartog (NED)	Ford France–Hutchinson	s.t.
7	Henri De Wolf (BEL)	Solo–Superia	+ 15"
8	Georges Groussard (FRA)	Pelforth–Sauvage–Lejeune	s.t.
9	Ferdinand Bracke (BEL)	Peugeot–BP–Michelin	+ 18"
10	Willy Monty (BEL)	Pelforth–Sauvage–Lejeune	+ 22"

General classification after stage 14a

Rank	Rider	Team	Time
1	Karl-Heinz Kunde (FRG)	Peugeot–BP–Michelin	73h 07' 14"
2	Jean-Claude Lebaube (FRA)	Kamomé–Dilecta–Dunlop	+ 27"
3	Guido Marcello Mugnaini (ITA)	Filotex	+ 44"
4	Jan Janssen (NED)	Pelforth–Sauvage–Lejeune	+ 1' 06"
5	Lucien Aimar (FRA)	Ford France–Hutchinson	+ 1' 36"
6	Guido De Rosso (ITA)	Molteni	+ 2' 15"
7	Raymond Delisle (FRA)	Peugeot–BP–Michelin	+ 2' 24"
8	José Antonio Momeñe (ESP)	Kas–Kaskol	+ 3' 28"
9	Tommaso de Pra (ITA)	Molteni	+ 3' 54"
10	Cees Haast (NED)	Televizier–Batavus	+ 4' 35"

== Stage 14b ==
5 July 1966 - Vals-les-Bains, 20 km (12 mi) (ITT)

Stage 14b result

Rank	Rider	Team	Time
1	Raymond Poulidor (FRA)	Mercier–BP–Hutchinson	28' 26"
2	Jacques Anquetil (FRA)	Ford France–Hutchinson	+ 7"
3	Rudi Altig (FRG)	Molteni	+ 29"
4	Rolf Wolfshohl (FRG)	Mercier–BP–Hutchinson	+ 33"
5	Tom Simpson (GBR)	Peugeot–BP–Michelin	+ 40"
6	José María Errandonea (ESP)	Fagor	s.t.
7	Gerben Karstens (NED)	Televizier–Batavus	s.t.
8	Antonio Gómez del Moral (ESP)	Kas–Kaskol	+ 46"
9	Lucien Aimar (FRA)	Ford France–Hutchinson	+ 47"
10	Francisco Gabica (ESP)	Kas–Kaskol	+ 49"

General classification after stage 14b

Rank	Rider	Team	Time
1	Karl-Heinz Kunde (FRG)	Peugeot–BP–Michelin	73h 37' 11"
2	Jan Janssen (NED)	Pelforth–Sauvage–Lejeune	+ 32"
3	Lucien Aimar (FRA)	Ford France–Hutchinson	+ 52"
4	Guido Marcello Mugnaini (ITA)	Filotex	+ 1' 16"
5	Jean-Claude Lebaube (FRA)	Kamomé–Dilecta–Dunlop	+ 1' 28"
6	Guido De Rosso (ITA)	Molteni	+ 2' 30"
7	Raymond Delisle (FRA)	Peugeot–BP–Michelin	+ 2' 46"
8	José Antonio Momeñe (ESP)	Kas–Kaskol	+ 3' 07"
9	Tommaso de Pra (ITA)	Molteni	+ 4' 33"
10	Cees Haast (NED)	Televizier–Batavus	+ 4' 37"

== Stage 15 ==
6 July 1966 - Privas to Le Bourg-d'Oisans, 203 km (126 mi)

Stage 15 result

Rank	Rider	Team	Time
1	Luis Otaño (ESP)	Fagor	5h 46' 20"
2	Joaquim Galera (ESP)	Kas–Kaskol	+ 2' 34"
3	Julio Jiménez (ESP)	Ford France–Hutchinson	s.t.
4	Roger Pingeon (FRA)	Peugeot–BP–Michelin	+ 2' 39"
5	Guido Reybrouck (BEL)	Roméo–Smith's	+ 2' 54"
6	Edward Sels (BEL)	Solo–Superia	+ 3' 15"
7	Francisco Gabica (ESP)	Kas–Kaskol	+ 3' 22"
8	Raymond Poulidor (FRA)	Mercier–BP–Hutchinson	s.t.
9	Valentín Uriona (ESP)	Kas–Kaskol	+ 3' 24"
10	Jan Janssen (NED)	Pelforth–Sauvage–Lejeune	+ 3' 53"

General classification after stage 15

Rank	Rider	Team	Time
1	Karl-Heinz Kunde (FRG)	Peugeot–BP–Michelin	79h 27' 55"
2	Jan Janssen (NED)	Pelforth–Sauvage–Lejeune	+ 31"
3	Lucien Aimar (FRA)	Ford France–Hutchinson	+ 58"
4	Guido Marcello Mugnaini (ITA)	Filotex	+ 2' 19"
5	Jean-Claude Lebaube (FRA)	Kamomé–Dilecta–Dunlop	+ 2' 31"
6	José Antonio Momeñe (ESP)	Kas–Kaskol	+ 3' 13"
7	Guido De Rosso (ITA)	Molteni	+ 3' 33"
8	Raymond Delisle (FRA)	Peugeot–BP–Michelin	+ 3' 49"
9	Cees Haast (NED)	Televizier–Batavus	+ 4' 52"
10	Raymond Poulidor (FRA)	Mercier–BP–Hutchinson	+ 5' 12"

== Stage 16 ==
7 July 1966 - Le Bourg-d'Oisans to Briançon, 148 km (92 mi)

Stage 16 result

Rank	Rider	Team	Time
1	Julio Jiménez (ESP)	Ford France–Hutchinson	4h 41' 59"
2	Jacques Anquetil (FRA)	Ford France–Hutchinson	+ 2' 25"
3	Raymond Poulidor (FRA)	Mercier–BP–Hutchinson	s.t.
4	Jos Huysmans (BEL)	Dr. Mann–Grundig	+ 2' 27"
5	Herman Van Springel (BEL)	Dr. Mann–Grundig	+ 3' 11"
6	Joaquim Galera (ESP)	Kas–Kaskol	+ 3' 28"
7	Willy Planckaert (BEL)	Roméo–Smith's	+ 3' 31"
8	Roger Pingeon (FRA)	Peugeot–BP–Michelin	s.t.
9	Lucien Aimar (FRA)	Ford France–Hutchinson	s.t.
10	Jan Janssen (NED)	Pelforth–Sauvage–Lejeune	s.t.

General classification after stage 16

Rank	Rider	Team	Time
1	Jan Janssen (NED)	Pelforth–Sauvage–Lejeune	84h 13' 55"
2	Lucien Aimar (FRA)	Ford France–Hutchinson	+ 27"
3	Guido Marcello Mugnaini (ITA)	Filotex	+ 1' 48"
4	José Antonio Momeñe (ESP)	Kas–Kaskol	+ 2' 42"
5	Karl-Heinz Kunde (FRG)	Peugeot–BP–Michelin	+ 3' 15"
6	Raymond Poulidor (FRA)	Mercier–BP–Hutchinson	+ 3' 36"
7	Jacques Anquetil (FRA)	Ford France–Hutchinson	+ 4' 44"
8	Francisco Gabica (ESP)	Kas–Kaskol	+ 5' 30"
9	Roger Pingeon (FRA)	Peugeot–BP–Michelin	+ 7' 28"
10	Martin Van Den Bossche (BEL)	Roméo–Smith's	+ 7' 32"

== Stage 17 ==
8 July 1966 - Briançon to Turin, 160 km (99 mi)

Stage 17 result

Rank	Rider	Team	Time
1	Franco Bitossi (ITA)	Filotex	4h 03' 00"
2	Antonio Gómez del Moral (ESP)	Kas–Kaskol	s.t.
3	Giuseppe Fezzardi (ITA)	Molteni	s.t.
4	Rolf Wolfshohl (FRG)	Mercier–BP–Hutchinson	s.t.
5	Herman Van Springel (BEL)	Dr. Mann–Grundig	+ 7"
6	Frans Brands (BEL)	Roméo–Smith's	+ 1' 40"
7	Domingo Perurena (ESP)	Fagor	s.t.
8	Lucien Aimar (FRA)	Ford France–Hutchinson	s.t.
9	Willy Planckaert (BEL)	Roméo–Smith's	+ 3' 42"
10	Henk Nijdam (NED)	Televizier–Batavus	s.t.

General classification after stage 17

Rank	Rider	Team	Time
1	Lucien Aimar (FRA)	Ford France–Hutchinson	88h 19' 02"
2	Jan Janssen (NED)	Pelforth–Sauvage–Lejeune	+ 1' 35"
3	Guido Marcello Mugnaini (ITA)	Filotex	+ 3' 23"
4	José Antonio Momeñe (ESP)	Kas–Kaskol	+ 4' 17"
5	Karl-Heinz Kunde (FRG)	Peugeot–BP–Michelin	+ 4' 50"
6	Raymond Poulidor (FRA)	Mercier–BP–Hutchinson	+ 5' 11"
7	Herman Van Springel (BEL)	Dr. Mann–Grundig	+ 6' 11"
8	Jacques Anquetil (FRA)	Ford France–Hutchinson	+ 6' 19"
9	Francisco Gabica (ESP)	Kas–Kaskol	+ 7' 05"
10	Roger Pingeon (FRA)	Peugeot–BP–Michelin	+ 9' 03"

== Rest Day 2 ==
9 July 1966 - Turin

== Stage 18 ==
10 July 1966 - Ivrea to Chamonix, 188 km (117 mi)

Stage 18 result

Rank	Rider	Team	Time
1	Edy Schütz (LUX)	Roméo–Smith's	5h 55' 46"
2	Raymond Poulidor (FRA)	Mercier–BP–Hutchinson	+ 1"
3	Jan Janssen (NED)	Pelforth–Sauvage–Lejeune	+ 50"
4	Herman Van Springel (BEL)	Dr. Mann–Grundig	s.t.
5	Martin Van Den Bossche (BEL)	Roméo–Smith's	s.t.
6	Jos Huysmans (BEL)	Dr. Mann–Grundig	s.t.
7	Jacques Anquetil (FRA)	Ford France–Hutchinson	s.t.
8	José Antonio Momeñe (ESP)	Kas–Kaskol	s.t.
9	Aurelio González (ESP)	Kas–Kaskol	s.t.
10	Lucien Aimar (FRA)	Ford France–Hutchinson	s.t.

General classification after stage 18

Rank	Rider	Team	Time
1	Lucien Aimar (FRA)	Ford France–Hutchinson	94h 15' 38"
2	Jan Janssen (NED)	Pelforth–Sauvage–Lejeune	+ 1' 35"
3	Guido Marcello Mugnaini (ITA)	Filotex	+ 3' 23"
4	José Antonio Momeñe (ESP)	Kas–Kaskol	+ 4' 17"
5	Raymond Poulidor (FRA)	Mercier–BP–Hutchinson	+ 4' 22"
6	Karl-Heinz Kunde (FRG)	Peugeot–BP–Michelin	+ 4' 50"
7	Herman Van Springel (BEL)	Dr. Mann–Grundig	+ 6' 11"
8	Jacques Anquetil (FRA)	Ford France–Hutchinson	+ 6' 19"
9	Francisco Gabica (ESP)	Kas–Kaskol	+ 7' 05"
10	Roger Pingeon (FRA)	Peugeot–BP–Michelin	+ 9' 03"

== Stage 19 ==
11 July 1966 - Chamonix to Saint-Étienne, 265 km (165 mi)

Stage 19 result

Rank	Rider	Team	Time
1	Ferdinand Bracke (BEL)	Peugeot–BP–Michelin	7h 07' 50"
2	Edy Schütz (LUX)	Roméo–Smith's	+ 51"
3	Esteban Martín (ESP)	Fagor	+ 52"
4	Aurelio González (ESP)	Kas–Kaskol	+ 54"
5	Domingo Perurena (ESP)	Fagor	+ 1' 02"
6	Willy Planckaert (BEL)	Roméo–Smith's	s.t.
7	Herman Van Springel (BEL)	Dr. Mann–Grundig	s.t.
8	Franco Bitossi (ITA)	Filotex	s.t.
9	Willy Monty (BEL)	Pelforth–Sauvage–Lejeune	+ 3' 42"
10	Ginés Garcia (ESP)	Fagor	s.t.

General classification after stage 19

Rank	Rider	Team	Time
1	Lucien Aimar (FRA)	Ford France–Hutchinson	101h 24' 30"
2	Jan Janssen (NED)	Pelforth–Sauvage–Lejeune	+ 1' 35"
3	Guido Marcello Mugnaini (ITA)	Filotex	+ 3' 23"
4	José Antonio Momeñe (ESP)	Kas–Kaskol	+ 4' 17"
5	Raymond Poulidor (FRA)	Mercier–BP–Hutchinson	+ 4' 22"
6	Karl-Heinz Kunde (FRG)	Peugeot–BP–Michelin	+ 4' 50"
7	Herman Van Springel (BEL)	Dr. Mann–Grundig	+ 6' 11"
8	Francisco Gabica (ESP)	Kas–Kaskol	+ 7' 05"
9	Roger Pingeon (FRA)	Peugeot–BP–Michelin	+ 9' 03"
10	Martin Van Den Bossche (BEL)	Roméo–Smith's	+ 9' 07"

== Stage 20 ==
12 July 1966 - Saint-Étienne to Montluçon, 223 km (139 mi)

Stage 20 result

Rank	Rider	Team	Time
1	Henk Nijdam (NED)	Televizier–Batavus	5h 57' 44"
2	Walter Boucquet (BEL)	Dr. Mann–Grundig	+ 1"
3	Ginés Garcia (ESP)	Fagor	+ 2"
4	Valentín Uriona (ESP)	Kas–Kaskol	+ 4"
5	Gerben Karstens (NED)	Televizier–Batavus	+ 53"
6	Willy Planckaert (BEL)	Roméo–Smith's	s.t.
7	Guido Reybrouck (BEL)	Roméo–Smith's	s.t.
8	Herman Van Springel (BEL)	Dr. Mann–Grundig	s.t.
9	Edward Sels (BEL)	Solo–Superia	s.t.
10	Jos Huysmans (BEL)	Dr. Mann–Grundig	s.t.

General classification after stage 20

Rank	Rider	Team	Time
1	Lucien Aimar (FRA)	Ford France–Hutchinson	107h 23' 07"
2	Jan Janssen (NED)	Pelforth–Sauvage–Lejeune	+ 1' 35"
3	Guido Marcello Mugnaini (ITA)	Filotex	+ 3' 23"
4	José Antonio Momeñe (ESP)	Kas–Kaskol	+ 4' 17"
5	Raymond Poulidor (FRA)	Mercier–BP–Hutchinson	+ 4' 22"
6	Karl-Heinz Kunde (FRG)	Peugeot–BP–Michelin	+ 4' 50"
7	Herman Van Springel (BEL)	Dr. Mann–Grundig	+ 6' 11"
8	Francisco Gabica (ESP)	Kas–Kaskol	+ 7' 05"
9	Roger Pingeon (FRA)	Peugeot–BP–Michelin	+ 9' 03"
10	Martin Van Den Bossche (BEL)	Roméo–Smith's	+ 9' 07"

== Stage 21 ==
13 July 1966 - Montluçon to Orléans, 232 km (144 mi)

Stage 21 result

Rank	Rider	Team	Time
1	Pierre Beuffeuil (FRA)	Kamomé–Dilecta–Dunlop	6h 06' 09"
2	Jos van der Vleuten (NED)	Televizier–Batavus	+ 3' 15"
3	Georges Vandenberghe (BEL)	Roméo–Smith's	+ 4' 13"
4	Walter Boucquet (BEL)	Dr. Mann–Grundig	+ 4' 14"
5	Sebastián Elorza (ESP)	Kas–Kaskol	s.t.
6	Yvo Molenaers (BEL)	Roméo–Smith's	s.t.
7	Victor Van Schil (BEL)	Mercier–BP–Hutchinson	s.t.
8	Gerben Karstens (NED)	Televizier–Batavus	+ 4' 18"
9	Edward Sels (BEL)	Solo–Superia	s.t.
10	Willy Planckaert (BEL)	Roméo–Smith's	s.t.

General classification after stage 21

Rank	Rider	Team	Time
1	Lucien Aimar (FRA)	Ford France–Hutchinson	113h 33' 34"
2	Jan Janssen (NED)	Pelforth–Sauvage–Lejeune	+ 1' 35"
3	Guido Marcello Mugnaini (ITA)	Filotex	+ 3' 23"
4	José Antonio Momeñe (ESP)	Kas–Kaskol	+ 4' 17"
5	Raymond Poulidor (FRA)	Mercier–BP–Hutchinson	+ 4' 22"
6	Karl-Heinz Kunde (FRG)	Peugeot–BP–Michelin	+ 4' 50"
7	Herman Van Springel (BEL)	Dr. Mann–Grundig	+ 6' 11"
8	Francisco Gabica (ESP)	Kas–Kaskol	+ 7' 05"
9	Roger Pingeon (FRA)	Peugeot–BP–Michelin	+ 9' 03"
10	Martin Van Den Bossche (BEL)	Roméo–Smith's	+ 9' 07"

== Stage 22a ==
14 July 1966 - Orléans to Rambouillet, 111 km (69 mi)

Stage 22a result

Rank	Rider	Team	Time
1	Edward Sels (BEL)	Solo–Superia	2h 50' 58"
2	Gerben Karstens (NED)	Televizier–Batavus	s.t.
3	Henk Nijdam (NED)	Televizier–Batavus	s.t.
4	Georges Vandenberghe (BEL)	Roméo–Smith's	s.t.
5	Willy Planckaert (BEL)	Roméo–Smith's	s.t.
6	Frans Brands (BEL)	Roméo–Smith's	s.t.
7	Michel Grain (FRA)	Ford France–Hutchinson	s.t.
8	Rik Wouters (NED)	Televizier–Batavus	s.t.
9	Herman Vrancken (BEL)	Dr. Mann–Grundig	s.t.
10	Christian Raymond (FRA)	Peugeot–BP–Michelin	s.t.

General classification after stage 22a

Rank	Rider	Team	Time
1	Lucien Aimar (FRA)	Ford France–Hutchinson	116h 24' 32"
2	Jan Janssen (NED)	Pelforth–Sauvage–Lejeune	+ 1' 35"
3	Guido Marcello Mugnaini (ITA)	Filotex	+ 3' 23"
4	José Antonio Momeñe (ESP)	Kas–Kaskol	+ 4' 17"
5	Raymond Poulidor (FRA)	Mercier–BP–Hutchinson	+ 4' 22"
6	Karl-Heinz Kunde (FRG)	Peugeot–BP–Michelin	+ 4' 50"
7	Herman Van Springel (BEL)	Dr. Mann–Grundig	+ 6' 11"
8	Francisco Gabica (ESP)	Kas–Kaskol	+ 7' 05"
9	Roger Pingeon (FRA)	Peugeot–BP–Michelin	+ 9' 03"
10	Martin Van Den Bossche (BEL)	Roméo–Smith's	+ 9' 07"

== Stage 22b ==
14 July 1966 - Rambouillet to Paris, 51 km (32 mi) (ITT)

Stage 22b result

Rank	Rider	Team	Time
1	Rudi Altig (FRG)	Molteni	1h 06' 48"
2	Ferdinand Bracke (BEL)	Peugeot–BP–Michelin	+ 7"
3	Raymond Poulidor (FRA)	Mercier–BP–Hutchinson	+ 41"
4	Luis Otaño (ESP)	Fagor	+ 1' 29"
5	Gerben Karstens (NED)	Televizier–Batavus	+ 1' 50"
6	José María Errandonea (ESP)	Fagor	+ 2' 14"
7	Domingo Perurena (ESP)	Fagor	s.t.
8	Roger Pingeon (FRA)	Peugeot–BP–Michelin	+ 2' 20"
9	Francisco Gabica (ESP)	Kas–Kaskol	+ 2' 21"
10	Carlos Echeverría (ESP)	Kas–Kaskol	+ 2' 23"

General classification after stage 22b

Rank	Rider	Team	Time
1	Lucien Aimar (FRA)	Ford France–Hutchinson	117h 34' 21"
2	Jan Janssen (NED)	Pelforth–Sauvage–Lejeune	+ 1' 07"
3	Raymond Poulidor (FRA)	Mercier–BP–Hutchinson	+ 2' 02"
4	José Antonio Momeñe (ESP)	Kas–Kaskol	+ 5' 19"
5	Guido Marcello Mugnaini (ITA)	Filotex	+ 5' 27"
6	Herman Van Springel (BEL)	Dr. Mann–Grundig	+ 5' 44"
7	Francisco Gabica (ESP)	Kas–Kaskol	+ 6' 25"
8	Roger Pingeon (FRA)	Peugeot–BP–Michelin	+ 8' 22"
9	Karl-Heinz Kunde (FRG)	Peugeot–BP–Michelin	+ 9' 06"
10	Martin Van Den Bossche (BEL)	Roméo–Smith's	+ 9' 57"
