= 1966 Tour de France =

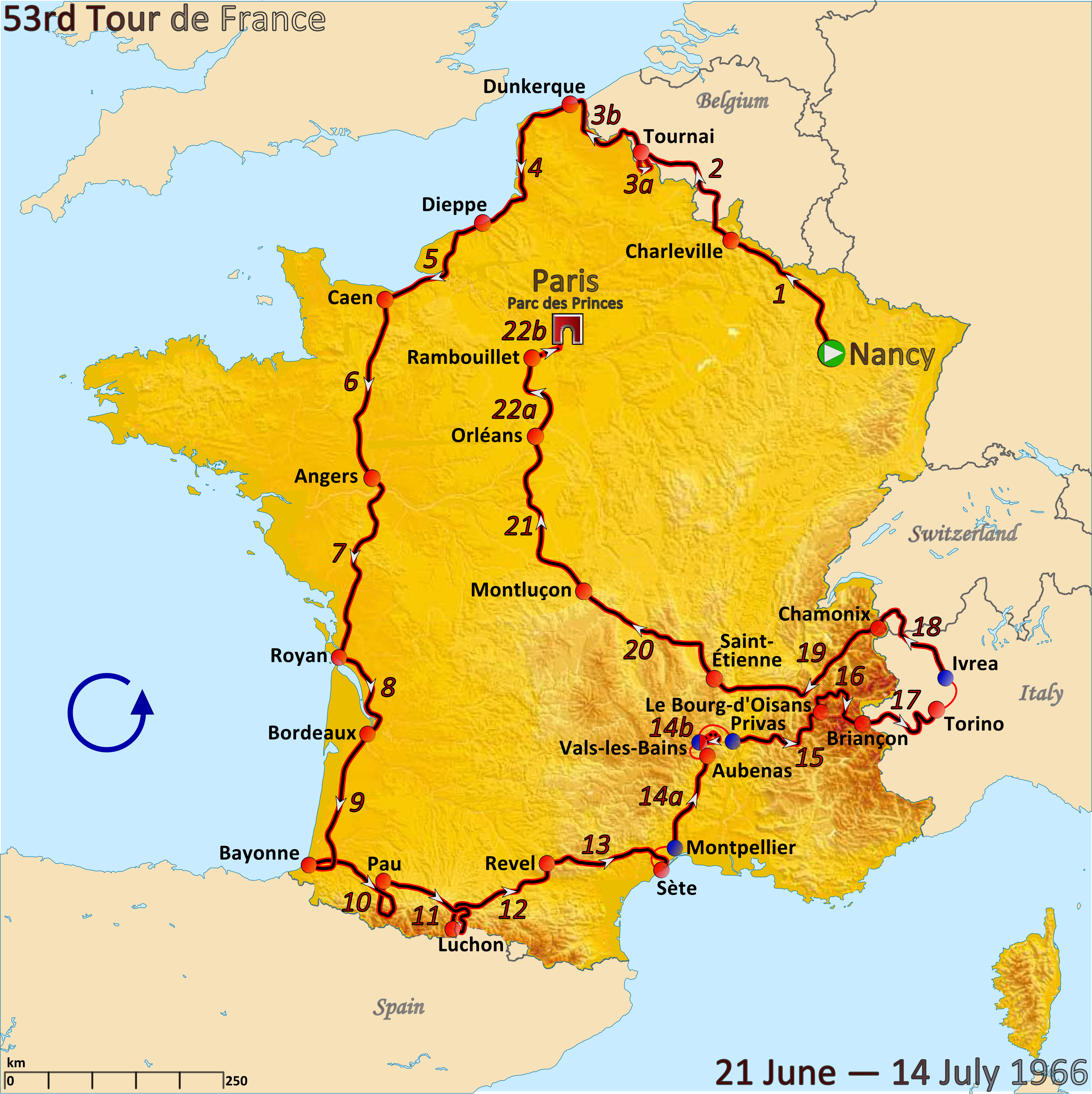
- Route of the 1966 Tour de France

Race details
- Dates: 21 June – 14 July 1966
- Stages: 22, including three split stages
- Distance: 4,329 km (2,690 mi)
- Winning time: 117h 34' 21"

Results
Jersey awarded to the overall winner	Winner	Lucien Aimar (FRA)	(Ford France–Hutchinson)
	Second	Jan Janssen (NED)	(Pelforth–Sauvage–Lejeune)
	Third	Raymond Poulidor (FRA)	(Mercier–BP–Hutchinson)
Jersey awarded to the points classification winner	Points	Willy Planckaert (BEL)	(Roméo–Smith's)
	Mountains	Julio Jiménez (ESP)	(Ford France–Hutchinson)
	Sprints	Guido Neri (ITA)	(Molteni)
	Combativity	Rudi Altig (FRG)	(Molteni)
	Team	Kas–Kaskol	

The 1966 Tour de France was the 53rd edition of the Tour de France, one of cycling's Grand Tours. It took place between 21 June and 14 July, with 22 stages covering a distance of 4,329 km (2,690 mi).

Lucien Aimar was a domestique of 5-time Tour winner Jacques Anquetil. Aimar joined a breakaway in the middle of the tour and ended up on the leader board. Anquetil then began helping Aimar win the Tour, to make sure and deny it to his then-enemy Raymond Poulidor. After stage 18 Aimar's victory was certain barring disaster. Anquetil rode hard that day to ensure it and then quit the race.

The points classification was won by Willy Planckaert, and the mountains classification by Julio Jiménez. The team classification was won by Kas–Kaskol.

During the Tour, word spread that there was going to be a dope test, and many riders left their hotels to avoid the tests. As a protest against the tests, riders staged a strike during stage nine, dismounting and walking their bicycles. Eventually they started riding again, but only after arguing with officials.

== Teams ==
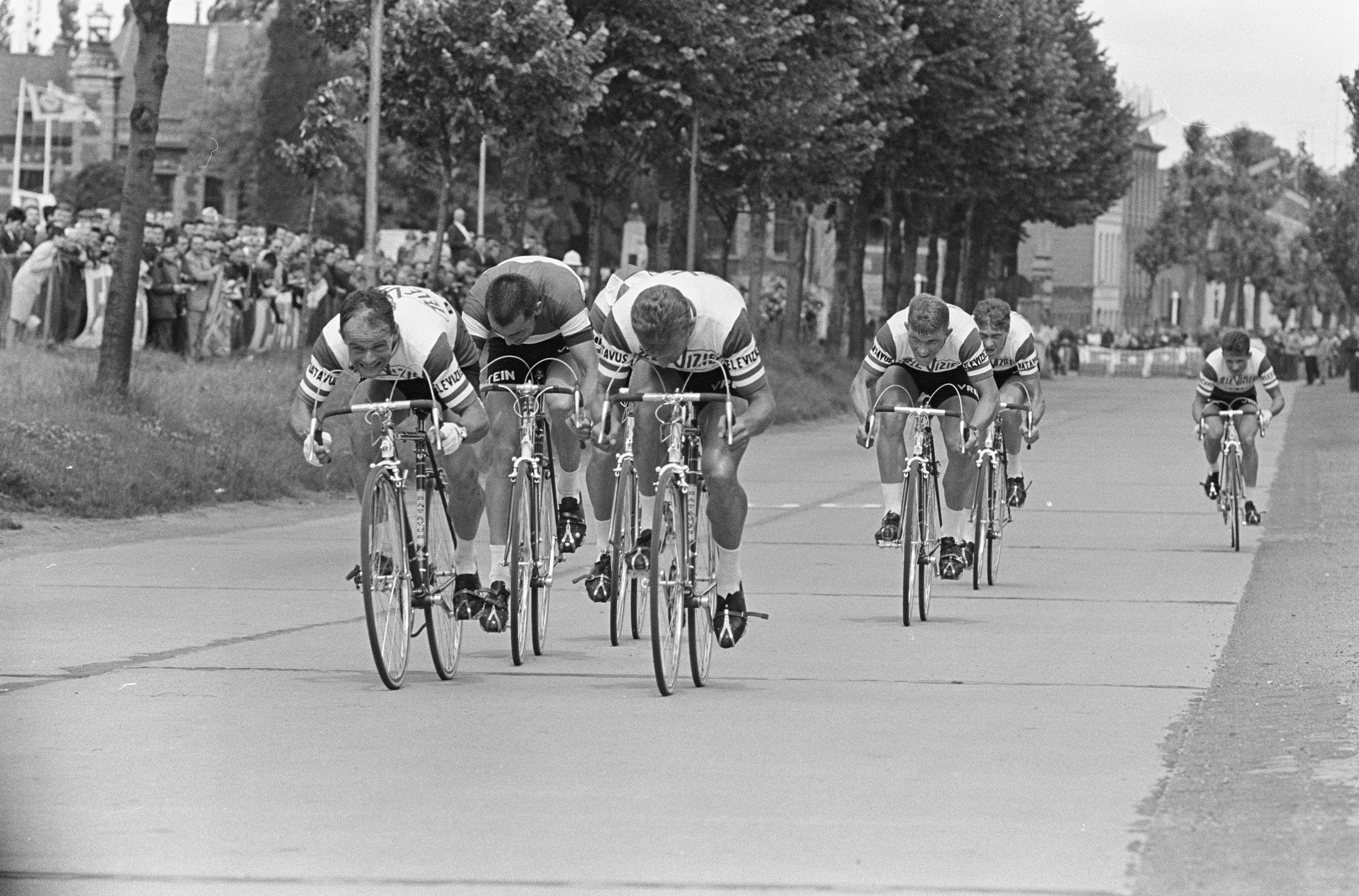
The Televizier–Batavus team during stage three's team time trial in Tournai, Belgium, which they won

As in the years before, the 1966 Tour de France was run with trade teams; each trade team consisted of 10 cyclists, and at least six of them needed to have the same nationality. The Tour organisation had full control over the team selection.

Initially, there would be only two Belgian teams, but one month before the Tour it was decided that three Belgian teams would be fielded, with the Smiths team being the late addition. Shortly after this, a medical test showed Felice Gimondi, winner of the 1965 Tour de France, could not defend his title because he was physically not fit; his Salvarani team then decided not to start at all, so the number of teams was back to thirteen.

The organisers then invited the Italian team Sanson (headed by Italo Zilioli and Franco Balmamion) to replace Salvarani, but at the last moment they refused. Thirteen teams started, for a total of 130 cyclists.

The teams entering the race were:

- Ford France–Hutchinson
- Kamomé–Dilecta–Dunlop
- Mercier–BP–Hutchinson
- Pelforth–Sauvage–Lejeune
- Peugeot–BP–Michelin
- Fagor
- Filotex
- Kas–Kaskol
- Dr. Mann–Grundig
- Molteni
- Roméo–Smith's
- Solo–Superia
- Televizier–Batavus

Because the champion of 1965 (Gimondi) and his team did not start, the number one jersey was given to the Ford France team, because they had the winner of 1964 (Anquetil).

== Route and stages ==
The 1966 Tour de France started on 21 June, and had two rest days, in Luchon and Turin. The highest point of elevation in the race was 2,556 m (8,386 ft) at the summit tunnel of the Col du Galibier mountain pass on stage 16.

Stage characteristics and winners
Stage	Date	Course	Distance	Type	Winner
1	21 June	Nancy to Charleville	209 km (130 mi)	Plain stage	Rudi Altig (FRG)
2	22 June	Charleville to Tournai (Belgium)	198 km (123 mi)	Plain stage	Guido Reybrouck (BEL)
3a	23 June	Tournai (Belgium)	21 km (13 mi)	Team time trial	(Netherlands) Televizier–Batavus
3b	23 June	Tournai to Dunkirk	131 km (81 mi)	Plain stage	Gerben Karstens (NED)
4	24 June	Dunkirk to Dieppe	205 km (127 mi)	Plain stage	Willy Planckaert (BEL)
5	25 June	Dieppe to Caen	178 km (111 mi)	Plain stage	Franco Bitossi (ITA)
6	26 June	Caen to Angers	217 km (135 mi)	Plain stage	Edward Sels (BEL)
7	27 June	Angers to Royan	252 km (157 mi)	Plain stage	Albert Van Vlierberghe (BEL)
8	28 June	Royan to Bordeaux	138 km (86 mi)	Plain stage	Willy Planckaert (BEL)
9	29 June	Bordeaux to Bayonne	201 km (125 mi)	Plain stage	Gerben Karstens (NED)
10	30 June	Bayonne to Pau	234 km (145 mi)	Stage with mountain(s)	Tommaso de Pra (ITA)
11	1 July	Pau to Luchon	188 km (117 mi)	Stage with mountain(s)	Guido Marcello Mugnaini (ITA)
	2 July	Luchon		Rest day	
12	3 July	Luchon to Revel	219 km (136 mi)	Stage with mountain(s)	Rudi Altig (FRG)
13	4 July	Revel to Sète	191 km (119 mi)	Plain stage	Georges Vandenberghe (BEL)
14a	5 July	Montpellier to Aubenas	144 km (89 mi)	Plain stage	Jo de Roo (NED)
14b	5 July	Vals-les-Bains	20 km (12 mi)	Individual time trial	Raymond Poulidor (FRA)
15	6 July	Privas to Le Bourg-d'Oisans	203 km (126 mi)	Stage with mountain(s)	Luís Otano (ESP)
16	7 July	Le Bourg-d'Oisans to Briançon	148 km (92 mi)	Stage with mountain(s)	Julio Jiménez (ESP)
17	8 July	Briançon to Turin (Italy)	160 km (99 mi)	Stage with mountain(s)	Franco Bitossi (ITA)
	9 July	Turin (Italy)		Rest day	
18	10 July	Ivrea (Italy) to Chamonix	188 km (117 mi)	Stage with mountain(s)	Edy Schütz (LUX)
19	11 July	Chamonix to Saint-Étienne	265 km (165 mi)	Stage with mountain(s)	Ferdinand Bracke (BEL)
20	12 July	Saint-Étienne to Montluçon	223 km (139 mi)	Plain stage	Henk Nijdam (NED)
21	13 July	Montluçon to Orléans	232 km (144 mi)	Plain stage	Pierre Beuffeuil (FRA)
22a	14 July	Orléans to Rambouillet	111 km (69 mi)	Plain stage	Edward Sels (BEL)
22b	14 July	Rambouillet to Paris	51 km (32 mi)	Individual time trial	Rudi Altig (FRG)
	Total		4,329 km (2,690 mi)		

The team time trial was decided by the times of the five fastest riders of each time; the outcome had no effect on the individual classifications.

== Race overview ==
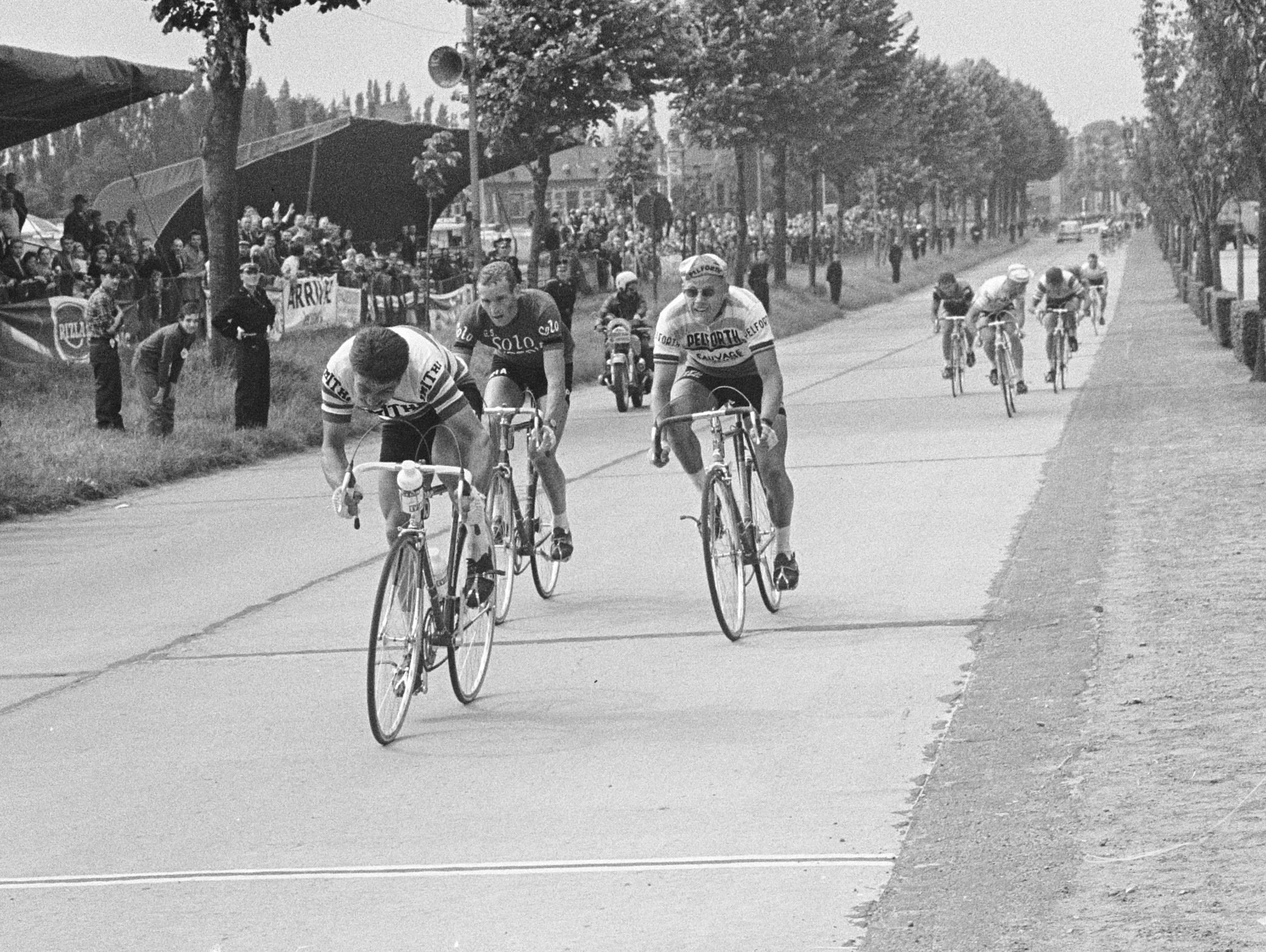
The finish of the stage two in Tournai, Belgium, won by Guido Reybrouck

Rudi Altig won the first stage with a small advantage. In the next stages, no big time differences were made, so Altig was able to defend his lead until the mountains.

The eighth stage broke the record for fastest mass-start stage, held since 1938.

The first mountains were in the tenth stage. A group including Lucien Aimar and Jan Janssen gained time on pre-race favourites Jacques Anquetil and Raymond Poulidor, and Tommaso de Pra won the race and became the new leader. The next stage, Lebaube became the leader, and Kunde took over in the twelfth stage.

In the time trial in the fourteenth stage, Anquetil was defeated by Poulidor. Kunde remained the leader, with Janssen in second place. In the sixteenth stage, Julio Jiménez escaped in the Pyrenées, and he was followed by a group including Janssen, Anquetil and Poulidor, but without Kunde. Jiménez stayed away, but Janssen became the new leader.

Even though the seventeenth stage included two mountain climbs, it was not considered too difficult, because these climbs were located in the first half of the stage. The cyclists made the climbs in one large group, but in the descent, a large group escaped. They were chased by teammates Anquetil and Aimar, and when most of the escapees were caught, Aimar continued on his own, and surprised Janssen by this. Janssen lost time on Aimar, and Aimar became the new leader.

In the eighteenth stage, Janssen wanted to attack, but Aimar and Anquetil stayed close to him. Poulidor, sixth in the general classification, managed to escape, but Anquetil led the chase on him. The next day, Anquetil left the race, sick and no longer able to win himself.

Janssen managed to win back some time on Aimar in the final time trial, but it was not enough, and Aimar became the winner of the Tour. Janssen became the first Dutch cyclist to reach the podium in the general classification in the Tour de France.

== Classification leadership and minor prizes ==
There were several classifications in the 1966 Tour de France, two of them awarding jerseys to their leaders. The most important was the general classification, calculated by adding each cyclist's finishing times on each stage. The cyclist with the least accumulated time was the race leader, identified by the yellow jersey; the winner of this classification is considered the winner of the Tour. Unlike the years before, the 1966 Tour did not use time bonuses for stage winners.

Additionally, there was a points classification. In the points classification, cyclists got points for finishing among the best in a stage finish. The cyclist with the most points led the classification and was identified with a green jersey.

There was also a mountains classification. The organisation had categorised some climbs as either first, second, third, or fourth category; points for this classification were won by the first cyclists that reached the top of these climbs first, with more points available for the higher-categorised climbs. The cyclist with the most points led the classification, but was not identified with a jersey. The Tour organisation had considered to add the rule that to be eligible for the mountains classification, a rider had to be placed high in the general classification. After protests from riders, this rule was changed, such that to win the mountains classification in 1966, a rider had to finish the entire Tour.

The intermediate sprints classification was newly introduced in 1966. Every stage had one intermediate sprint, and the first three riders at each sprint scored points. The intermediate sprints did not give a time bonus for the general classification, nor points for the points classification. There was no special jersey for the leader of this classification.

For the team classification, the times of the best three cyclists per team on each stage were added; the leading team was the team with the lowest total time. The riders in the team that led this classification wore yellow caps.

In addition, there was a combativity award given after each stage to the cyclist considered most combative, although it did not use this name in 1966. The split stages each had a combined winner. The decision was made by a jury composed of journalists who gave "stars". The cyclist with the most "stars" in all stages lead the "star classification". Rudi Altig won this classification. The Souvenir Henri Desgrange was given to the first rider to pass the memorial to Tour founder Henri Desgrange near the summit of the Col du Galibier on stage 16. This prize was won by Julio Jiménez.

Classification leadership by stage
Stage	Winner	General classification	Points classification	Mountains classification (Note: No jersey was awarded to the leader of the mountains classification until a white jersey with red polka dots was introduced in 1975.)	Intermediate sprints classification	Team classification	Combativity		Bad luck award
Stage	Winner	General classification	Points classification	Mountains classification	Intermediate sprints classification	Team classification	Award	Classification	Bad luck award
1	Rudi Altig	Rudi Altig	Rudi Altig	Giacomo Fornoni	Guido Neri	Molteni	Rudi Altig	Rudi Altig	Henk Nijdam
2	Guido Reybrouck	Rudi Altig	Guido Reybrouck	Tommaso de Pra	Guido Neri	Molteni	Tommaso de Pra	Rudi Altig	Julien Delocht
3a	Televizier–Batavus	Rudi Altig	Guido Reybrouck	Tommaso de Pra	Guido Neri	Roméo–Smith's	Gerben Karstens	Rudi Altig	Robert Cazala
3b	Gerben Karstens	Rudi Altig	Willy Planckaert	Domingo Perurena	Jan Boonen	Roméo–Smith's	Gerben Karstens	Rudi Altig	Robert Cazala
4	Willy Planckaert	Rudi Altig	Willy Planckaert	Domingo Perurena	Jan Boonen	Roméo–Smith's	Tom Simpson	Rudi Altig	Henk Nijdam
5	Franco Bitossi	Rudi Altig	Willy Planckaert	Domingo Perurena	Jan Boonen	Roméo–Smith's	Johny Schleck	Rudi Altig	Tom Simpson
6	Edward Sels	Rudi Altig	Willy Planckaert	Domingo Perurena	Jan Boonen	Roméo–Smith's	Aurelio González Puente	Rudi Altig	Joseph Novales
7	Albert Van Vlierberghe	Rudi Altig	Willy Planckaert	Domingo Perurena	Jan Boonen	Roméo–Smith's	Rudi Altig	Rudi Altig	no award
8	Willy Planckaert	Rudi Altig	Willy Planckaert	Domingo Perurena	Jan Boonen	Roméo–Smith's	Rik Van Looy	Rudi Altig	Mariano Díaz
9	Gerben Karstens	Rudi Altig	Willy Planckaert	Domingo Perurena	Jan Boonen	Roméo–Smith's	Henk Nijdam	Rudi Altig	Rolf Wolfshohl
10	Tommaso de Pra	Tommaso de Pra	Willy Planckaert	Tommaso de Pra	Jan Boonen	Molteni	Mariano Díaz	Rudi Altig	Giacomo Fornoni
11	Guido Marcello Mugnaini	Jean-Claude Lebaube	Willy Planckaert	Guido Marcello Mugnaini	Jan Boonen	Kas–Kaskol	Guido Marcello Mugnaini	Rudi Altig	no award
12	Rudi Altig	Karl-Heinz Kunde	Willy Planckaert	Julio Jiménez	Jan Boonen	Kas–Kaskol	Rudi Altig	Rudi Altig	Aurelio González Puente
13	Georges Vandenberghe	Karl-Heinz Kunde	Willy Planckaert	Julio Jiménez	Jan Boonen	Kas–Kaskol	Tom Simpson	Rudi Altig	Rik Van Looy
14a	Jo de Roo	Karl-Heinz Kunde	Willy Planckaert	Julio Jiménez	Jan Boonen	Kas–Kaskol	Ferdinand Bracke	Rudi Altig	Victor Van Schil
14b	Raymond Poulidor	Karl-Heinz Kunde	Willy Planckaert	Julio Jiménez	Jan Boonen	Kas–Kaskol	Ferdinand Bracke	Rudi Altig	Victor Van Schil
15	Luís Otano	Karl-Heinz Kunde	Willy Planckaert	Joaquim Galera	Jan Boonen	Kas–Kaskol	Luis Otaño	Rudi Altig	Willy Planckaert
16	Julio Jiménez	Jan Janssen	Willy Planckaert	Julio Jiménez	Guido Neri	Kas–Kaskol	Julio Jiménez	Rudi Altig	Julien Delocht
17	Franco Bitossi	Lucien Aimar	Willy Planckaert	Julio Jiménez	Guido Neri	Kas–Kaskol	Lucien Aimar	Rudi Altig	Tom Simpson
18	Edy Schütz	Lucien Aimar	Willy Planckaert	Julio Jiménez	Guido Neri	Kas–Kaskol	Raymond Poulidor	Rudi Altig	Guido De Rosso
19	Ferdinand Bracke	Lucien Aimar	Willy Planckaert	Julio Jiménez	Guido Neri	Kas–Kaskol	Ferdinand Bracke	Rudi Altig	Jean-Claude Lebaube
20	Henk Nijdam	Lucien Aimar	Willy Planckaert	Julio Jiménez	Guido Neri	Kas–Kaskol	Multiple riders	Rudi Altig	no award
21	Pierre Beuffeuil	Lucien Aimar	Willy Planckaert	Julio Jiménez	Guido Neri	Kas–Kaskol	Pierre Beuffeuil	Rudi Altig	no award
22a	Edward Sels	Lucien Aimar	Willy Planckaert	Julio Jiménez	Guido Neri	Kas–Kaskol	Multiple riders	Rudi Altig	Jacques Anquetil
22b	Rudi Altig	Lucien Aimar	Willy Planckaert	Julio Jiménez	Guido Neri	Kas–Kaskol	Multiple riders	Rudi Altig	Raymond Poulidor
Final		Lucien Aimar	Willy Planckaert	Julio Jiménez	Guido Neri	Kas–Kaskol	Rudi Altig		Tom Simpson

== Final standings ==
=== General classification ===
Final general classification (1–10)
Rank	Rider	Team	Time
1	Lucien Aimar (FRA)	Ford France–Hutchinson	117h 34' 21"
2	Jan Janssen (NED)	Pelforth–Sauvage–Lejeune	+ 1' 07"
3	Raymond Poulidor (FRA)	Mercier–BP–Hutchinson	+ 2' 02"
4	José Antonio Momeñe (ESP)	Kas–Kaskol	+ 5' 19"
5	Marcello Mugnaini (ITA)	Filotex	+ 5' 27"
6	Herman Van Springel (BEL)	Dr. Mann–Grundig	+ 5' 44"
7	Francisco Gabica (ESP)	Kas–Kaskol	+ 6' 25"
8	Roger Pingeon (FRA)	Peugeot–BP–Michelin	+ 8' 22"
9	Karl-Heinz Kunde (FRG)	Peugeot–BP–Michelin	+ 9' 06"
10	Martin Vandenbossche (BEL)	Roméo–Smith's	+ 9' 57"

Final general classification (11–82)
Rank	Rider	Team	Time
11	Antonio Gómez del Moral (ESP)	Kas–Kaskol	+ 10' 18"
12	Rudi Altig (FRG)	Molteni	+ 11' 18"
13	Julio Jiménez (ESP)	Ford France–Hutchinson	+ 11' 18"
14	Valentín Uriona (ESP)	Kas–Kaskol	+ 11' 59"
15	Joaquim Galera (ESP)	Kas–Kaskol	+ 13' 02"
16	Joseph Huysmans (BEL)	Dr. Mann–Grundig	+ 14' 39"
17	Franco Bitossi (ITA)	Filotex	+ 16' 35"
18	Domingo Perurena (ESP)	Fagor	+ 17' 29"
19	Willy Monty (BEL)	Pelforth–Sauvage–Lejeune	+ 18' 23"
20	Mariano Díaz (ESP)	Fagor	+ 19' 58"
21	Raymond Delisle (FRA)	Peugeot–BP–Michelin	+ 22' 17"
22	Esteban Martín (ESP)	Fagor	+ 22' 59"
23	André Zimmermann (FRA)	Peugeot–BP–Michelin	+ 24' 45"
24	Aurelio González (ESP)	Kas–Kaskol	+ 26' 02"
25	Carlos Echeverría (ESP)	Kas–Kaskol	+ 26' 47"
26	Luis Otaño (ESP)	Fagor	+ 28' 31"
27	Armand Desmet (BEL)	Solo–Superia	+ 28' 42"
28	Ginés García (ESP)	Fagor	+ 30' 11"
29	Luis-Pedro Santamarina (ESP)	Fagor	+ 30' 50"
30	Georges Groussard (FRA)	Pelforth–Sauvage–Lejeune	+ 31' 24"
31	Sebastián Elorza (ESP)	Kas–Kaskol	+ 32' 32"
32	Ferdinand Bracke (BEL)	Peugeot–BP–Michelin	+ 33' 54"
33	Frans Brands (BEL)	Roméo–Smith's	+ 34' 35"
34	Edy Schütz (LUX)	Roméo–Smith's	+ 34' 56"
35	Johny Schleck (LUX)	Pelforth–Sauvage–Lejeune	+ 35' 30"
36	Cees Haast (NED)	Televizier–Batavus	+ 36' 04"
37	Gregorio San Miguel (ESP)	Kas–Kaskol	+ 38' 13"
38	Edward Sels (BEL)	Solo–Superia	+ 39' 50"
39	Rolf Wolfshohl (FRG)	Mercier–BP–Hutchinson	+ 41' 28"
40	Willy Planckaert (BEL)	Roméo–Smith's	+ 42' 12"
41	José-Manuel Lopez Rodriguez (ESP)	Fagor	+ 42' 24"
42	Giuseppe Fezzardi (ITA)	Molteni	+ 44' 44"
43	André Foucher (FRA)	Pelforth–Sauvage–Lejeune	+ 48' 47"
44	Ugo Colombo (ITA)	Filotex	+ 49' 35"
45	Arie den Hartog (NED)	Ford France–Hutchinson	+ 49' 43"
46	Gerben Karstens (NED)	Televizier–Batavus	+ 50' 13"
47	Louis Rostollan (FRA)	Kamomé–Dilecta–Dunlop	+ 50' 17"
48	Jesus Aranzabal (ESP)	Fagor	+ 52' 32"
49	Ramón Mendiburu (ESP)	Fagor	+ 53' 03"
50	Raymond Mastrotto (FRA)	Kamomé–Dilecta–Dunlop	+ 53' 21"
51	Henri Duez (FRA)	Peugeot–BP–Michelin	+ 54' 36"
52	André Messelis (BEL)	Dr. Mann–Grundig	+ 56' 43"
53	Guido Reybrouck (BEL)	Roméo–Smith's	+ 57' 44"
54	Christian Raymond (FRA)	Peugeot–BP–Michelin	+ 59' 53"
55	Maurice Izier (FRA)	Pelforth–Sauvage–Lejeune	+ 1h 00' 00"
56	José-Maria Errandonea (ESP)	Fagor	+ 1h 01' 26"
57	Désiré Letort (FRA)	Peugeot–BP–Michelin	+ 1h 03' 21"
58	Edouard Delberghe (FRA)	Pelforth–Sauvage–Lejeune	+ 1h 05' 54"
59	Maurice Benet (FRA)	Kamomé–Dilecta–Dunlop	+ 1h 06' 26"
60	Georges Vandenberghe (BEL)	Roméo–Smith's	+ 1h 06' 27"
61	Jean Stablinski (FRA)	Ford France–Hutchinson	+ 1h 09' 06"
62	André Darrigade (FRA)	Kamomé–Dilecta–Dunlop	+ 1h 10' 42"
63	Roger Swerts (BEL)	Mercier–BP–Hutchinson	+ 1h 12' 02"
64	Hubertus Zilverberg (NED)	Televizier–Batavus	+ 1h 14' 08"
65	Herman Vrancken (BEL)	Dr. Mann–Grundig	+ 1h 14' 13"
66	Michel Grain (FRA)	Ford France–Hutchinson	+ 1h 16' 36"
67	Jean Monteyne (BEL)	Solo–Superia	+ 1h 16' 54"
68	Rik Wouters (NED)	Televizier–Batavus	+ 1h 23' 13"
69	Albertus Geldermans (NED)	Molteni	+ 1h 25' 23"
70	Walter Boucquet (BEL)	Dr. Mann–Grundig	+ 1h 25' 31"
71	Pierre Beuffeuil (FRA)	Kamomé–Dilecta–Dunlop	+ 1h 25' 39"
72	Victor Van Schil (BEL)	Mercier–BP–Hutchinson	+ 1h 27' 42"
73	Henk Nijdam (NED)	Televizier–Batavus	+ 1h 28' 20"
74	Willy In' t Ven (BEL)	Dr. Mann–Grundig	+ 1h 31'27"
75	Jos van der Vleuten (NED)	Televizier–Batavus	+ 1h 31' 44"
76	Henri Dewolf (BEL)	Solo–Superia	+ 1h 33' 29"
77	Guido Neri (ITA)	Molteni	+ 1h 38' 10"
78	Gilbert Bellone (FRA)	Mercier–BP–Hutchinson	+ 1h 38' 28"
79	Jean Milesi (FRA)	Ford France–Hutchinson	+ 1h 45' 43"
80	Robert Cazala (FRA)	Mercier–BP–Hutchinson	+ 1h 54' 16"
81	Yvo Molenaers (BEL)	Roméo–Smith's	+ 1h 59' 45"
82	Paolo Mannucci (ITA)	Filotex	+ 2h 05' 26"

=== Points classification ===
Final points classification (1–10)
Rank	Rider	Team	Points
1	Willy Planckaert (BEL)	Roméo–Smith's	211
2	Gerben Karstens (NED)	Televizier–Batavus	189
3	Edward Sels (BEL)	Solo–Superia	178
4	Jan Janssen (NED)	Pelforth–Sauvage–Lejeune	144
5	Guido Reybrouck (BEL)	Roméo–Smith's	119
6	Georges Vandenberghe (BEL)	Roméo–Smith's	112
7	Rudi Altig (FRG)	Molteni	101
8	Joseph Huysmans (BEL)	Dr. Mann–Grundig	100
9	Walter Boucquet (BEL)	Dr. Mann–Grundig	82
10	Henk Nijdam (NED)	Televizier–Batavus	71

=== Mountains classification ===
Final mountains classification (1–10)
Rank	Rider	Team	Points
1	Julio Jiménez (ESP)	Ford France–Hutchinson	123
2	Joaquim Galera (ESP)	Kas–Kaskol	98
3	Aurelio González (ESP)	Kas–Kaskol	51
4	Raymond Poulidor (FRA)	Mercier–BP–Hutchinson	49
5	Franco Bitossi (ITA)	Filotex	48
6	Edy Schütz (LUX)	Roméo–Smith's	47
7	Martin Vandenbossche (BEL)	Roméo–Smith's	34
8	Gregorio San Miguel (ESP)	Kas–Kaskol	34
9	Roger Pingeon (FRA)	Peugeot–BP–Michelin	26
10	Mariano Diaz (ESP)	Fagor	25

=== Intermediate sprints classification ===
Final intermediate sprints classification (1–10)
Rank	Rider	Team	Points
1	Guido Neri (ITA)	Molteni	19
2	André Darrigade (FRA)	Kamomé–Dilecta–Dunlop	12
3	Georges Vandenberghe (BEL)	Roméo–Smith's	10
4	Maurice Benet (FRA)	Kamomé–Dilecta–Dunlop	8
5	Herman Vrancken (BEL)	Dr. Mann–Grundig	6
6	Henri Dewolf (BEL)	Solo–Superia	4
7	Rolf Wolfshohl (FRG)	Mercier–BP–Hutchinson	4
8	Pierre Beuffeuil (FRA)	Kamomé–Dilecta–Dunlop	3
9	Robert Cazala (FRA)	Mercier–BP–Hutchinson	3
10	Aurelio González (ESP)	Kas–Kaskol	3

=== Team classification ===
Final team classification
Rank	Team	Time
1	Kas–Kaskol	355h 02' 45"
2	Ford France–Hutchinson	+ 17' 32"
3	Peugeot–BP–Michelin	+ 19' 04"
4	Fagor	+ 26' 30"
5	Pelforth–Sauvage–Lejeune	+ 37' 21"
6	Roméo–Smith's	+ 55' 03"
7	Filotex	+ 58' 35"
8	Dr. Mann–Grundig	+ 58' 54"
9	Molteni	+ 1h 01' 37"
10	Mercier–BP–Hutchinson	+ 1h 12' 09"
11	Televizier–Batavus	+ 1h 38' 37"
12	Solo–Superia	+ 1h 56' 54"
13	Kamomé–Dilecta–Dunlop	+ 2h 13' 04"

=== Combativity classification ===
Final combativity classification (1–10)
Rank	Rider	Team	Points
1	Rudi Altig (FRG)	Molteni	124
2	Raymond Poulidor (FRA)	Mercier–BP–Hutchinson	68
3	Jan Janssen (NED)	Pelforth–Sauvage–Lejeune	55
4	Julio Jiménez (ESP)	Ford France–Hutchinson	55
5	Aurelio González (ESP)	Kas–Kaskol	48
6	Lucien Aimar (FRA)	Ford France–Hutchinson	46
7	Edy Schütz (LUX)	Roméo–Smith's	37
8	André Darrigade (FRA)	Kamomé–Dilecta–Dunlop	36
9	Franco Bitossi (ITA)	Filotex	35
10	Ferdinand Bracke (BEL)	Peugeot–BP–Michelin	35

== Doping ==
In June 1965, the French government enacted a law that made doping in sports illegal. This made knowingly taking doping explicitly not allowed in the Tour de France. Doping tests were for the first time held during the 1966 Tour de France, and were conducted on behalf of the French government, not the Tour organisation. As such, no time penalty was given for a positive result, and riders were not expelled from the race.

The first doping tests of the 1966 Tour were held after the eighth stage, in Bordaux; Raymond Poulidor was amongst the first tested. In the next stage, riders held a protest during the stage against the doping tests.

A second round of doping tests was done after the twelfth stage. In total, 12 doping tests were done, all of them using urine samples. Six riders gave positive results:

- Herman Vanspringel
- Julien Delocht
- Guido Neri
- Gilbert Bellone
- Jean Dupont
- Roger Milliot

Riders received a fine of up to 5000 francs from the French government. Bellone appealed the penalty, on the grounds that it was not proven that he knowingly had taken doping. Judgement was made in 1969, and the appeal was successful: because it is almost impossible to prove that someone takes doping knowingly, the law was thereafter seldomly used.

== Aftermath ==
The Tour of 1966 did not give the battle between Anquetil and Poulidor that spectators had hoped for. The organisation acknowledged that the 1966 Tour had been a failure, and decided that the formula needed to be changed.

The organisation of the Tour de France was not happy with the riders' reactions on the doping controls. The organisation also looked at the success of the 1966 FIFA World Cup, and its success was credited to using national teams, and the mix of professional and amateur athletes. The Tour de France organisation wanted to copy this, and wanted to make the 1967 Tour be a Tour with national teams, partly professional and partly amateur.

The amateur teams should have come from communist countries, but they were not interested. The idea of having national teams was protested against by the trade teams. The trade teams suggested a compromise of "national trade teams": one trade team for each country would be chosen, which could include riders from other teams, using their own shirt sponsors. But this compromise was not used, and the 1967 Tour would be held with national teams; the Tour organisation sent invitations to national associations, who would select riders.

== Bibliography ==
- Amels, Wim (1984). De geschiedenis van de Tour de France 1903–1984 (in Dutch). Valkenswaard, Netherlands: Sport-Express. ISBN 978-90-70763-05-3.
- Augendre, Jacques (2016). Guide historique [Historical guide] (PDF) (in French). Paris: Amaury Sport Organisation. Archived (PDF) from the original on 17 August 2016.
- McGann, Bill; McGann, Carol (2008). The Story of the Tour de France: 1965–2007. Vol. 2. Indianapolis: Dog Ear Publishing. ISBN 978-1-59858-608-4.
- Nauright, John; Parrish, Charles (2012). Sports Around the World: History, Culture, and Practice. Vol. 2. Santa Barbara, California: ABC-CLIO. ISBN 978-1-59884-300-2.
- van den Akker, Pieter (2018). Tour de France Rules and Statistics: 1903–2018. Self-published. ISBN 978-1-79398-080-9.
- van den Akker, Pieter (2023). Tour de France Rules and Statistics: 1903–2023. Self-published. ISBN 979-8859110544.
