= 1967 Vuelta a España, Stage 1a to Stage 9 =

Cycling race stages

The 1967 Vuelta a España was the 22nd edition of the Vuelta a España, one of cycling's Grand Tours. The Vuelta began in Vigo on 27 April, and Stage 9 occurred on 5 May with a stage to Sitges. The race finished in Bilbao on 14 May.

== Stage 1a ==
27 April 1967 - Vigo to O Baixo Miño, 110 km (68.4 mi)

Stage 1a result

Rank	Rider	Team	Time
1	Guido Reybrouck (BEL)	Roméo–Smith's	2h 49' 12"
2	Jean Graczyk (FRA)	Bic–Hutchinson	+ 10"
3	Christian Raymond (FRA)	Peugeot–BP–Michelin	+ 20"
4	Domingo Perurena (ESP)	Fagor	s.t.
5	Henk Nijdam (NED)	Televizier–Batavus	s.t.
6	Johny Schleck (LUX)	Pelforth–Sauvage–Lejeune	s.t.
7	Jean-Pierre Ducasse (FRA)	Pelforth–Sauvage–Lejeune	s.t.
8	Gerben Karstens (NED)	Televizier–Batavus	s.t.
9	Marino Vigna (ITA)	Vittadello	s.t.
10	Michele Dancelli (ITA)	Vittadello	s.t.

== Stage 1b ==
27 April 1967 - Vigo to Vigo, 4.1 km (2.5 mi) (ITT)

Stage 1b result

Rank	Rider	Team	Time
1	Jan Janssen (NED)	Pelforth–Sauvage–Lejeune	4' 46"
2	José María Errandonea (ESP)	Fagor	s.t.
3	Raymond Poulidor (FRA)	Mercier–BP–Hutchinson	+ 18"
4	Antonio Gómez del Moral (ESP)	Kas–Kaskol	+ 19"
5	José Manuel López (ESP)	Fagor	s.t.
6	Francisco Gabica (ESP)	Kas–Kaskol	+ 21"
7	Guido De Rosso (ITA)	Vittadello	s.t.
8	Gerben Karstens (NED)	Televizier–Batavus	+ 22"
9	Bernard Van de Kerckhove (BEL)	Pelforth–Sauvage–Lejeune	+ 23"
10	Jean-Pierre Ducasse (FRA)	Pelforth–Sauvage–Lejeune	+ 24"

General classification after Stage 1b

Rank	Rider	Team	Time
1	Jan Janssen (NED)	Pelforth–Sauvage–Lejeune	2h 54' 18"
2	José María Errandonea (ESP)	Fagor	s.t.
3	Raymond Poulidor (FRA)	Mercier–BP–Hutchinson	+ 18"
4	José Manuel López (ESP)	Fagor	+ 19"
5	Antonio Gómez del Moral (ESP)	Kas–Kaskol	s.t.
6	Guido De Rosso (ITA)	Vittadello	+ 21"
7	Francisco Gabica (ESP)	Kas–Kaskol	s.t.
8	Gerben Karstens (NED)	Televizier–Batavus	+ 22"
9	Bernard Van de Kerckhove (BEL)	Pelforth–Sauvage–Lejeune	+ 23"
10	Jean-Pierre Ducasse (FRA)	Pelforth–Sauvage–Lejeune	+ 24"

== Stage 2 ==
28 April 1967 - Pontevedra to Ourense, 186 km (115.6 mi)

Route:

Stage 2 result

Rank	Rider	Team	Time
1	Domingo Perurena (ESP)	Fagor	5h 19' 36"
2	Michele Dancelli (ITA)	Vittadello	+ 20"
3	Bart Zoet (NED)	Televizier–Batavus	+ 40"
4	Jean-Pierre Ducasse (FRA)	Pelforth–Sauvage–Lejeune	s.t.
5	Wim de Jager (NED)	Roméo–Smith's	s.t.
6	Julien Delocht (BEL)	Pelforth–Sauvage–Lejeune	s.t.
7	Cees Haast (NED)	Televizier–Batavus	s.t.
8	Vicente López Carril (ESP)	Kas–Kaskol	s.t.
9	André Foucher (FRA)	Mercier–BP–Hutchinson	s.t.
10	Gregorio San Miguel (ESP)	Kas–Kaskol	s.t.

General classification after Stage 2

Rank	Rider	Team	Time
1	Domingo Perurena (ESP)	Fagor	8h 14' 27"
2	Michele Dancelli (ITA)	Vittadello	+ 20"
3	José Manuel López (ESP)	Fagor	+ 26"
4	Jean-Pierre Ducasse (FRA)	Pelforth–Sauvage–Lejeune	+ 31"
5	Arie den Hartog (NED)	Bic–Hutchinson	+ 32"
6	Luis Otaño (ESP)	Fagor	+ 33"
7	Gregorio San Miguel (ESP)	Kas–Kaskol	+ 34"
8	Mariano Díaz (ESP)	Fagor	+ 37"
9	Georges Groussard (FRA)	Pelforth–Sauvage–Lejeune	+ 38"
10	Julien Delocht (BEL)	Pelforth–Sauvage–Lejeune	+ 40"

== Stage 3 ==
29 April 1967 - Ourense to Astorga, 230 km (140 mi)

Route:

Stage 3 result

Rank	Rider	Team	Time
1	Ramón Sáez Marzo (ESP)	Ferrys	7h 29' 17"
2	Carlos Echeverria (ESP)	Kas–Kaskol	+ 20"
3	Michele Dancelli (ITA)	Vittadello	+ 40"
4	Michel Jacquemin (BEL)	Roméo–Smith's	s.t.
5	Johny Schleck (LUX)	Pelforth–Sauvage–Lejeune	s.t.
6	Guido Reybrouck (BEL)	Roméo–Smith's	s.t.
7	José Antonio Pontón Ruiz (ESP)	Ferrys	s.t.
8	Jean Dumont (FRA)	Peugeot–BP–Michelin	s.t.
9	Bernard Van de Kerckhove (BEL)	Pelforth–Sauvage–Lejeune	s.t.
10	José Manuel López (ESP)	Fagor	s.t.

General classification after Stage 3

Rank	Rider	Team	Time
1	Domingo Perurena (ESP)	Fagor	15h 44' 24"
2	José Manuel López (ESP)	Fagor	+ 26"
3	Jean-Pierre Ducasse (FRA)	Pelforth–Sauvage–Lejeune	s.t.
4	Arie den Hartog (NED)	Bic–Hutchinson	+ 32"
5	Luis Otaño (ESP)	Fagor	+ 33"
6	Gregorio San Miguel (ESP)	Kas–Kaskol	+ 34"
7	Mariano Díaz (ESP)	Fagor	+ 37"
8	Georges Groussard (FRA)	Pelforth–Sauvage–Lejeune	+ 38"
9	Julien Delocht (BEL)	Pelforth–Sauvage–Lejeune	+ 40"
10	Aurelio González Puente (ESP)	Kas–Kaskol	+ 43"

== Stage 4 ==
30 April 1967 - Astorga to Salamanca, 201 km (125 mi)

Route:

Stage 4 result

Rank	Rider	Team	Time
1	Ramón Sáez Marzo (ESP)	Ferrys	5h 15' 21"
2	Michele Dancelli (ITA)	Vittadello	+ 20"
3	Christian Leduc (FRA)	Bic–Hutchinson	+ 40"
4	Gerben Karstens (NED)	Televizier–Batavus	s.t.
5	Jean Graczyk (FRA)	Bic–Hutchinson	s.t.
6	Guido Reybrouck (BEL)	Roméo–Smith's	s.t.
7	Johny Schleck (LUX)	Pelforth–Sauvage–Lejeune	s.t.
8	Maurice Izier (FRA)	Pelforth–Sauvage–Lejeune	s.t.
9	Marino Vigna (ITA)	Vittadello	s.t.
10	Serge Bolley (FRA)	Bic–Hutchinson	s.t.

General classification after Stage 4

Rank	Rider	Team	Time
1	Michele Dancelli (ITA)	Vittadello	21h 00' 25"
2	Domingo Perurena (ESP)	Fagor	s.t.
3	José Manuel López (ESP)	Fagor	+ 26"
4	Jean-Pierre Ducasse (FRA)	Pelforth–Sauvage–Lejeune	+ 31"
5	Arie den Hartog (NED)	Bic–Hutchinson	+ 32"
6	Luis Otaño (ESP)	Fagor	+ 33"
7	Gregorio San Miguel (ESP)	Kas–Kaskol	+ 34"
8	Mariano Díaz (ESP)	Fagor	+ 37"
9	Georges Groussard (FRA)	Pelforth–Sauvage–Lejeune	+ 38"
10	Julien Delocht (BEL)	Pelforth–Sauvage–Lejeune	+ 40"

== Stage 5 ==
1 May 1967 - Salamanca to Madrid, 201 km (125 mi)

Stage 5 result

Rank	Rider	Team	Time
1	Tom Simpson (GBR)	Peugeot–BP–Michelin	5h 11' 25"
2	José Pérez Francés (ESP)	Kas–Kaskol	+ 1' 02"
3	José Manuel López (ESP)	Fagor	+ 1' 22"
4	Arie den Hartog (NED)	Bic–Hutchinson	s.t.
5	Mariano Díaz (ESP)	Fagor	s.t.
6	Jean-Pierre Ducasse (FRA)	Pelforth–Sauvage–Lejeune	s.t.
7	Jan Janssen (NED)	Pelforth–Sauvage–Lejeune	+ 6' 36"
8	Jan Harings (NED)	Televizier–Batavus	s.t.
9	Gerben Karstens (NED)	Televizier–Batavus	s.t.
10	Domingo Perurena (ESP)	Fagor	s.t.

General classification after Stage 5

Rank	Rider	Team	Time
1	José Manuel López (ESP)	Fagor	26h 13' 36"
2	Jean-Pierre Ducasse (FRA)	Pelforth–Sauvage–Lejeune	+ 7"
3	Arie den Hartog (NED)	Bic–Hutchinson	+ 8"
4	José Pérez Francés (ESP)	Kas–Kaskol	+ 2' 54"
5	Michele Dancelli (ITA)	Vittadello	+ 4' 50"
6	Domingo Perurena (ESP)	Fagor	s.t.
7	Luis Otaño (ESP)	Fagor	+ 5' 23"
8	Gregorio San Miguel (ESP)	Kas–Kaskol	+ 5' 24"
9	Mariano Díaz (ESP)	Fagor	+ 5' 27"
10	Georges Groussard (FRA)	Pelforth–Sauvage–Lejeune	+ 5' 28"

== Stage 6 ==
2 May 1967 - Albacete to Benidorm, 212 km (132 mi)

Route:

Stage 6 result

Rank	Rider	Team	Time
1	Evert Dolman (NED)	Televizier–Batavus	4h 58' 54"
2	Jan Janssen (NED)	Pelforth–Sauvage–Lejeune	+ 20"
3	Luis Otaño (ESP)	Fagor	+ 40"
4	Cees Haast (NED)	Televizier–Batavus	s.t.
5	José Antonio Pontón Ruiz (ESP)	Ferrys	s.t.
6	Ramón Mendiburu Ibarburu (ESP)	Fagor	s.t.
7	Gregorio San Miguel (ESP)	Kas–Kaskol	s.t.
8	Jean-Pierre Ducasse (FRA)	Pelforth–Sauvage–Lejeune	s.t.
9	Aurelio González Puente (ESP)	Kas–Kaskol	s.t.
10	Angelino Soler (ESP)	Karpy	s.t.

General classification after Stage 6

Rank	Rider	Team	Time
1	Jean-Pierre Ducasse (FRA)	Pelforth–Sauvage–Lejeune	31h 13' 17"
2	Luis Otaño (ESP)	Fagor	+ 5' 16"
3	Gregorio San Miguel (ESP)	Kas–Kaskol	+ 5' 17"
4	Aurelio González Puente (ESP)	Kas–Kaskol	+ 5' 26"
5	Cees Haast (NED)	Televizier–Batavus	+ 5' 34"
6	Jan Janssen (NED)	Pelforth–Sauvage–Lejeune	+ 7' 23"
7	José Manuel López (ESP)	Fagor	+ 7' 38"
8	Arie den Hartog (NED)	Bic–Hutchinson	+ 7' 44"
9	Ramón Mendiburu Ibarburu (ESP)	Fagor	+ 8' 23"
10	Angelino Soler (ESP)	Karpy	+ 8' 25"

== Stage 7 ==
3 May 1967 - Benidorm to Valencia, 148 km (92 mi)

Route:

Stage 7 result

Rank	Rider	Team	Time
1	Gerben Karstens (NED)	Televizier–Batavus	3h 15' 50"
2	Tom Simpson (GBR)	Peugeot–BP–Michelin	+ 20"
3	Jan Harings (NED)	Televizier–Batavus	+ 40"
4	Jan Janssen (NED)	Pelforth–Sauvage–Lejeune	s.t.
5	José Pérez Francés (ESP)	Kas–Kaskol	s.t.
6	Ramón Sáez Marzo (ESP)	Ferrys	s.t.
7	Rolf Wolfshohl (FRG)	Bic–Hutchinson	s.t.
8	José Antonio Momeñe (ESP)	Fagor	s.t.
9	Johny Schleck (LUX)	Pelforth–Sauvage–Lejeune	s.t.
10	Cees Haast (NED)	Televizier–Batavus	s.t.

General classification after Stage 7

Rank	Rider	Team	Time
1	Jean-Pierre Ducasse (FRA)	Pelforth–Sauvage–Lejeune	34h 29' 47"
2	Luis Otaño (ESP)	Fagor	+ 5' 16"
3	Cees Haast (NED)	Televizier–Batavus	+ 5' 34"
4	Gregorio San Miguel (ESP)	Kas–Kaskol	+ 5' 57"
5	Aurelio González Puente (ESP)	Kas–Kaskol	+ 6' 06"
6	Jan Janssen (NED)	Pelforth–Sauvage–Lejeune	+ 7' 23"
7	José Manuel López (ESP)	Fagor	+ 7' 38"
8	Arie den Hartog (NED)	Bic–Hutchinson	+ 7' 44"
9	Ramón Mendiburu Ibarburu (ESP)	Fagor	+ 8' 23"
10	Angelino Soler (ESP)	Karpy	+ 8' 25"

== Stage 8 ==
4 May 1967 - Valencia to Vinaròs, 145 km (90 mi)

Route:

Stage 8 result

Rank	Rider	Team	Time
1	Gilbert Bellone (FRA)	Mercier–BP–Hutchinson	3h 17' 25"
2	Ramón Sáez Marzo (ESP)	Ferrys	+ 21"
3	Julien Delocht (BEL)	Pelforth–Sauvage–Lejeune	+ 41"
4	Johny Schleck (LUX)	Pelforth–Sauvage–Lejeune	s.t.
5	Juan Daniel Perera Ruiz (ESP)	Ferrys	+ 43"
6	Henk Nijdam (NED)	Televizier–Batavus	s.t.
7	Jan Janssen (NED)	Pelforth–Sauvage–Lejeune	s.t.
8	Bernard Van de Kerckhove (BEL)	Pelforth–Sauvage–Lejeune	s.t.
9	Marino Vigna (ITA)	Vittadello	s.t.
10	Evert Dolman (NED)	Televizier–Batavus	s.t.

General classification after Stage 8

Rank	Rider	Team	Time
1	Jean-Pierre Ducasse (FRA)	Pelforth–Sauvage–Lejeune	37h 47' 55"
2	Luis Otaño (ESP)	Fagor	+ 5' 16"
3	Cees Haast (NED)	Televizier–Batavus	+ 5' 34"
4	Gregorio San Miguel (ESP)	Kas–Kaskol	+ 5' 57"
5	Aurelio González Puente (ESP)	Kas–Kaskol	+ 6' 06"
6	Jan Janssen (NED)	Pelforth–Sauvage–Lejeune	+ 7' 23"
7	José Manuel López (ESP)	Fagor	+ 7' 38"
8	Arie den Hartog (NED)	Bic–Hutchinson	+ 7' 44"
9	Ramón Mendiburu Ibarburu (ESP)	Fagor	+ 8' 23"
10	Angelino Soler (ESP)	Karpy	+ 8' 25"

== Stage 9 ==
5 May 1967 - Vinaròs to Sitges, 172 km (107 mi)

Route:

Stage 9 result

Rank	Rider	Team	Time
1	Jan Lauwers (BEL)	Roméo–Smith's	4h 03' 41"
2	Henk Nijdam (NED)	Televizier–Batavus	+ 20"
3	Domingo Perurena (ESP)	Fagor	+ 40"
4	Serge Bolley (FRA)	Bic–Hutchinson	s.t.
5	Theo Mertens (BEL)	Peugeot–BP–Michelin	s.t.
6	Gerben Karstens (NED)	Televizier–Batavus	s.t.
7	Jean Graczyk (FRA)	Bic–Hutchinson	s.t.
8	José Pérez Francés (ESP)	Kas–Kaskol	s.t.
9	Ramón Sáez Marzo (ESP)	Ferrys	s.t.
10	Johny Schleck (LUX)	Pelforth–Sauvage–Lejeune	s.t.

General classification after Stage 9

Rank	Rider	Team	Time
1	Jean-Pierre Ducasse (FRA)	Pelforth–Sauvage–Lejeune	41h 52' 16"
2	Luis Otaño (ESP)	Fagor	+ 5' 16"
3	Cees Haast (NED)	Televizier–Batavus	+ 5' 34"
4	Gregorio San Miguel (ESP)	Kas–Kaskol	+ 5' 57"
5	Aurelio González Puente (ESP)	Kas–Kaskol	+ 6' 06"
6	Jan Janssen (NED)	Pelforth–Sauvage–Lejeune	+ 7' 23"
7	José Manuel López (ESP)	Fagor	+ 7' 38"
8	Arie den Hartog (NED)	Bic–Hutchinson	+ 7' 44"
9	Ramón Mendiburu Ibarburu (ESP)	Fagor	+ 8' 23"
10	Angelino Soler (ESP)	Karpy	+ 8' 25"
