= Kessel–Lier =

Belgian cycling race

Kessel-Lier
Race details
- Date: May, June, July, August
- Region: Flanders, Belgium
- English name: Kessel-Lier
- Local name(s): Kessel-Lier (Dutch)
- Discipline: Road
- Competition: Cat. 1.2
- Type: One-day

History
- First edition: 1954
- Editions: 25
- Final edition: 1980
- First winner: André Blomme (BEL)
- Most wins: Frans Aerenhouts (BEL); Joseph Huysmans (BEL) (2 wins)
- Final winner: Hendrik Caethoven (BEL)

Kessel-Lier was a men's cycling race organized for the last time in 1980. The race was run in the Antwerp Province (Belgium) between Kessel and Lier.

The competition's roll of honor includes the successes of Rik Van Looy and Herman Van Springel.

== Winners ==
Year	Winner	Second	Third
1954	(Belgium) André Blomme	(Belgium) Jozef De Feyter	(Belgium) Marcel Ryckaet
1955	(Belgium) Julien Cools	(Belgium) Aloïs De Hertog	(Belgium) Eugène Van Roosbroeck
1956	(Belgium) Alfons Vandenbrande	(Belgium) Maurice Baële	(Belgium) Joseph Mariën
1957	(Belgium) Karel Borgmans	(Belgium) Willy Schroeders	(Belgium) Jan Van Gompel
1958	(Belgium) Jan Zagers	(Belgium) Joseph Theuns	(Belgium) Jan Van Gompel
1959	(Belgium) Jozef Verachtert	(Belgium) Michel Van Aerde	(Belgium) Joseph Janssens
1960	(Belgium) Frans Aerenhouts	(Belgium) Jan Van Gompel	(Belgium) Robert Duerinckx
1961	(Belgium) Frans Aerenhouts	(Belgium) Leopold Schaeken	(Belgium) Lode Troonbeeckx
1962	(Belgium) Rick Luyten	(Belgium) Raymond Vrancken	(Netherlands) Adriaan Biemans
1963	(Belgium) Ludo Janssens	(Belgium) Jan Lauwers	(Belgium) Jan Van Gompel
1964	(Belgium) Joseph Haeseldonckx	(Netherlands) Lex Van Kreuningen	(Belgium) Jean-Baptiste Claes
1965	(Belgium) Lode Troonbeeckx	(Belgium) Jos Dewit	(Belgium) Joseph Haeseldonckx
1966	(Belgium) Joseph Huysmans	(Belgium) Lucien Willekens	(Belgium) Hugo Hellemans
1967	(Belgium) Willy In 't Ven	(Belgium) Jean-Baptiste Claes	(Germany) Peter Glemser
1968	(Belgium) Joseph Spruyt	(Belgium) Julien Stevens	(Belgium) Victor Van Schil
1969	(Belgium) Paul In 't Ven	(Belgium) Jos Deschoenmaecker	(Netherlands) Eddy Beugels
1970	(Belgium) Rik Van Looy	(Belgium) Julien Delocht	(Belgium) Roger Cooreman
1971	(Belgium) Victor Van Schil	(Belgium) Jos Abelshausen	(Colombia) Giovanni Jimenez
1972	(Belgium) Herman Van Springel	(Netherlands) Richard Bukati	(Netherlands) Harry Van Leeuwen
1973	(Belgium) Alfons De Bal	(Belgium) Jos Abelshausen	(Belgium) Victor Van Schil
1974	(Belgium) Joseph Huysmans	(Belgium) Marc Sohet	(Belgium) Victor Van Schil
1975	(Belgium) André Delcroix	(Belgium) Gustaaf Van Roosbroeck	(Belgium) Jozef Jacobs
1976	(Belgium) Frans Mintjens	(Belgium) André Delcroix	(Belgium) Willy Scheers
1977-1978	No race		
1979	(Netherlands) Martin Havik	(Belgium) Leo Van Thielen	(Belgium) René Dillen
1980	(Belgium) Hendrik Caethoven	(Belgium) Emiel Gijssemans	(Belgium) Marc Goossens
