= Julien Delocht =

Belgian cyclist

Personal information
- Born: 21 February 1942 (age 84)

Cycling career
- Sport: Cycling
- Current team: Retired
- Role: Rider

Professional teams
- 1966—1967: Pelforth–Sauvage–Lejeune
- 1968—1970: Faema

Julien Delocht (born 21 February 1942) is a Belgian racing cyclist. He rode in the 1966 Tour de France.

== Major results ==
1965
5th Overall Tour de l'Avenir
7th Brussel-Liege
1966
3rd Overall GP du Midi-Libre
4th GP Orchies
4th Primus Classic
1967
1st Circuit Dunkerque
4th GP Petit Varois
4th GP Cannes
7th Omloop Het Volk
8th Omloop der Zennevallei
1968
1st Circuit de Niel
1st Stage 4 (TTT) Paris–Nice
3rd GP Stad Vilvoorde
9th Polder-Kemper
1969
2nd Omloop het Waasland
4th Grand Prix Cerami
7th Circuit de Niel
8th Flèche Hesbignonne
10th Kessel–Lier
1970
2nd Kessel–Lier
2nd Brussel-Bievene
4th 1. Meiprijs – V. Bruyne
8th Omloop der Zennevallei
8th Tour de Wallonie
10th Omloop van Midden-België

Grand Tour	1966	1967	1968
Vuelta a España	—	65	DNF
Giro d'Italia	Did not Compete		
Tour de France	DNF	—	—

Legend
—	Did not compete
DNF	Did not finish
