= Guido Neri =

Italian cyclist (1939–2026)

Personal information
- Born: 27 January 1939 Cesena
- Died: 30 October 2026 (aged 87)

Cycling career
- Sport: Cycling
- Discipline: Road
- Role: Rider

Professional teams
- 1962: Torpado
- 1963: San Pellegrino–Firte
- 1964–1966: Molteni
- 1967–1969: Max Meyer
- 1970: Scic

Guido Neri (27 January 1939 – 30 October 2026) was an Italian racing cyclist. He rode in two Tours de France and eight Giro d'Italia.

== Career ==
His first and only race victory was the first edition of Trofeo Laigueglia in 1964. During the 1966 Tour de France he won the intermediate sprints classification.

Following his retirement from cycling in 1970 he started a custom bicycle brand which as of 2026 still produces bicycles.

Neri died on 30 October 2026, at the age of 87.

== Major results ==
1960
1st Giro del Casentino
1961
1st Coppa Collecchio
1st Coppa del Mobilio
1962
7th Grand Prix de Forli
7th Coppa Placci
7th Grand Prix Cemab
1963
4th Classica Sarda
8th Züri-Metzgete
1964 (1 Pro win)
1st Trofeo Laigueglia
7th Giro di Campania
9th Giro di Toscana
10th Genoa–Nice
1965
8th Giro della Provincia di Reggio Calabria
8th Grand Prix Cemab
1966
1st Sprints classification Tour de France
9th Züri-Metzgete
10th Trofeo Matteotti
1967
8th Giro della Romagna
1968
3rd Overall Cronostafetta
5th Grand Prix Cemab
1969
6th Gran Piemonte
8th Grand Prix de Forli
1970
7th Classica Sarda

=== Grand Tours general classification results timeline ===
Grand Tour	1962	1963	1964	1965	1966	1967	1968	1969	1970
Vuelta a España	—	—	—	—	—	—	—	37	—
Giro d'Italia	24	47	27	64	—	40	51	45	87
Tour de France	—	—	—	—	77	DNF	—	—	—

Legend
—	Did not compete
DNF	Did not finish
