= Tommaso de Pra =

Italian cyclist

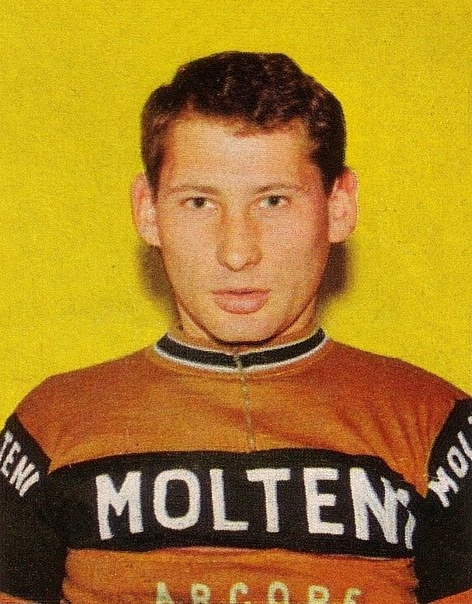

Personal information
- Full name: Tommaso de Pra
- Born: 16 December 1938 (age 87) Mortara, Italy

Cycling career
- Sport: Cycling
- Discipline: Road
- Role: Rider

Major wins
- One stage Tour de France

Tommaso de Pra (born 16 December 1938) is a former Italian professional road bicycle racer. De Pra was professional from 1963 to 1971. He rode the Tour de France twice, won one stage and wore the yellow jersey for one day in 1966. He rode the Tour again in 1971 and during that edition there were Combativity, Elegance and Kindness Awards given after each stage. Following stage 4 he was given the Kindness Award. His other career highlights include stage win in Tirreno–Adriatico, the Vuelta a España and the Tour de Suisse, as well as wins in the Italian semi-classics the Coppa Ugo Agostoni in 1965, the Trofeo Calzani Cabiate and the Circuito degli Assi.

== Major results ==
1965
Coppa Agostoni
1966
Tour de France:

Winner stage 10
Wearing yellow jersey for one day

1967
Trofeo Colzani
1968
Vuelta a España:

Winner stage 3B
