= Ramón Mendiburu =

Spanish cyclist

Personal information
- Born: 12 March 1940 (age 86)

Cycling career
- Sport: Cycling
- Role: Rider

Ramón Mendiburu (born 12 March 1940) is a Spanish racing cyclist. He rode in the 1965 Tour de France.

After his career as a cyclists, Mendiburu became a race organizer. After the disastrous 1982 Vuelta a España, where the winner of the race was disqualified for doping, he managed to get the 1983 Vuelta shown live on Spanish television. This made it more interesting for sponsors, which increased the budget of the organisation and revived the Vuelta.
