= Ford France (cycling team) =

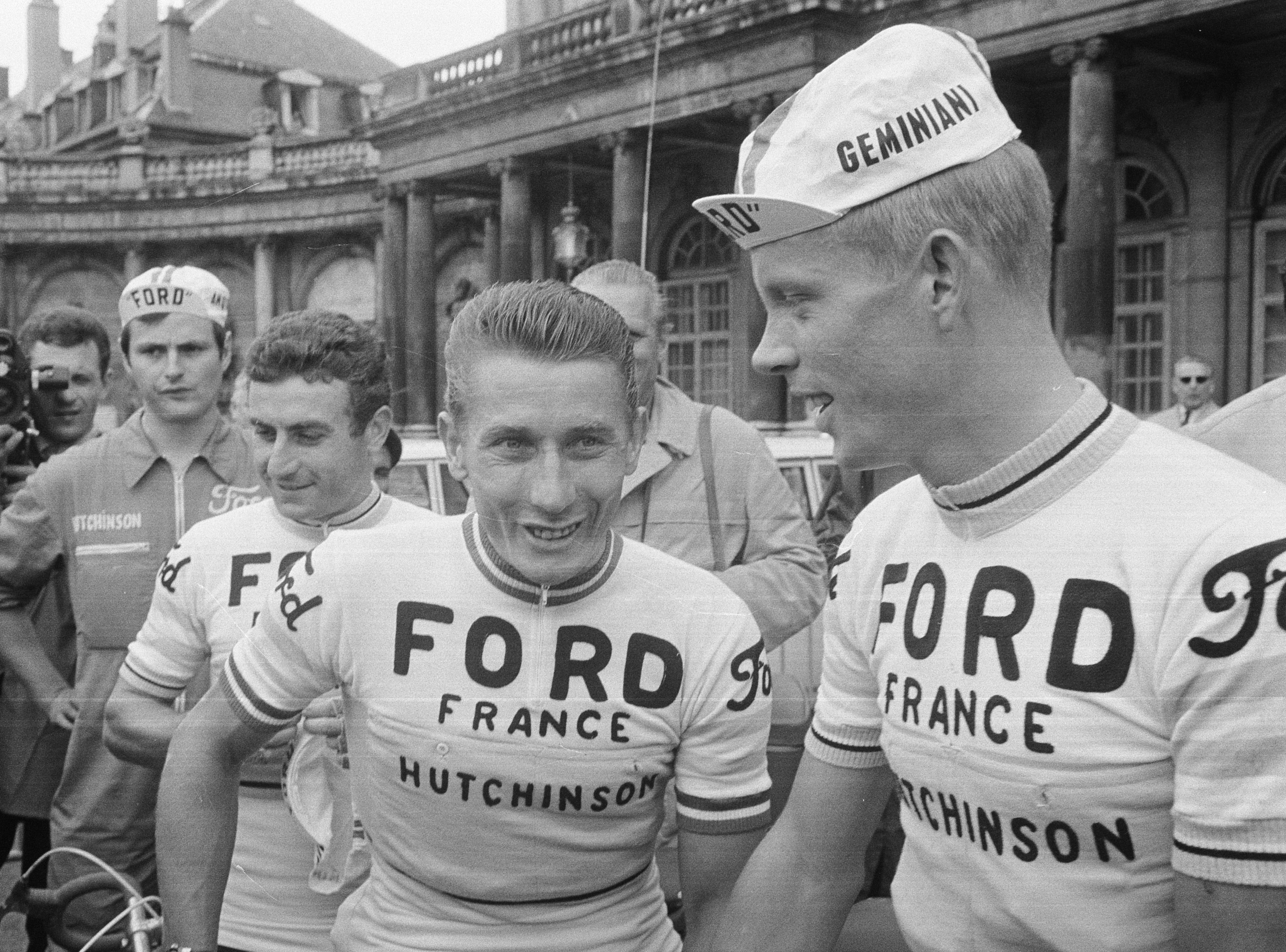
- Ford France–Hutchinson riders Lucien Aimar, Jacques Anquetil and Arie den Hartog at the 1966 Tour de France

Team information
- UCI code: France
- Founded: 1965
- Disbanded: 1966
- Discipline: Road

Team name history
- 1965 1966: Ford France–Gitane; Ford France–Hutchinson

Ford France was a French professional cycling team that existed from 1965 to 1966. The team's main sponsor was Ford France, a subsidiary of the American automaker Ford Motor Company. The team had two different co-sponsors for both seasons, bicycle manufacturer Gitane and tire manufacturer Hutchinson SA, respectively.
