= Maurice Benet =

French cyclist

Personal information
- Born: 5 November 1941 (age 84)

Cycling career
- Sport: Cycling
- Role: Rider

Maurice Benet (born 5 November 1941) is a French racing cyclist. He rode in the 1966 Tour de France.
