= Kamomé–Dilecta =

Team information
- Registered: France
- Founded: 1966
- Disbanded: 1967
- Discipline: Road

Key personnel
- General manager: Louis Caput; Maurice Moucheraud (1967)

Team name history
- 1966 1967: Kamomé–Dilecta–Dunlop; Kamomé–Dilecta–Wobler

Kamomé–Dilecta was a French professional cycling team that existed in 1966 and 1967. It participated in the 1966 Tour de France, with Pierre Beuffeuil winning stage 21.
