= Herman Vrancken =

Belgian cyclist

Personal information
- Born: 28 April 1944 (age 82)

Cycling career
- Sport: Cycling
- Role: Rider

Herman Vrancken (born 28 April 1944) is a Belgian racing cyclist. He rode in the 1966 Tour de France.
