= Walter Boucquet =

Belgian cyclist (1941–2018)

- Boucquet for Dr. Mann-Grundig

Personal information
- Born: 11 May 1941 Meulebeke, Belgium
- Died: 10 February 2018 (aged 76) Ingelmunster, Belgium

Cycling career
- Sport: Cycling
- Discipline: Road
- Role: Rider

Professional teams
- 1962: Dr. Mann–Labo
- 1963–1965: Flandria–Faema
- 1966–1967: Dr. Mann–Grundig
- 1968–1969: Pull Over Centrale–Novy
- 1970: Dr. Mann–Grundig

Major wins
- Grand Tours Giro d'Italia 1 individual stage (1964) Stage races Tour de l'Oise (1968) One-day races and Classics Brussels–Ingooigem (1964) Brussels–Meulebeke (1970) Other Grand Prix des Nations (1964)

Walter Boucquet (11 May 1941 in Meulebeke – 10 February 2018 in Ingelmunster) was a Belgian cyclist.

== Major results ==
1963
1st Stage 3 Tour du Nord
2nd Overall Tour de Picardie (1953-1965)
3rd Grand Prix des Nations
3rd Trofeo Baracchi
3rd Leiedal Koerse
3rd Tielt–Antwerpen–Tielt
1964
1st Stage 12 Giro d'Italia
1st Brussels–Ingooigem
1st Grand Prix des Nations
1st Stage 6 Volta a Portugal
2nd Circuit du Sud-Ouest
1965
1st Tielt–Antwerpen–Tielt
1st GP de Belgique
1st Circuit du Brabant occidental
4th overall Tour de Suisse
1966
1st Stage 2a Four Days of Dunkirk
1st Omloop van het Houtland
1st GP de Belgique
2nd Bruxelles–Verviers
1967
3rd Kuurne–Brussels–Kuurne
1968
1st Overall Tour de l'Oise
1st Omloop van het Houtland
1st GP Roeselare
1st Sint Martens-Lierde
1st Circuit du Brabant occidental
1969
1st Stage 3 Grand Prix du Midi Libre
1970
1st Bruxelles–Meulebeke
3rd Omloop Midden-Vlaanderen
