= Guido Marcello Mugnaini =

Italian cyclist

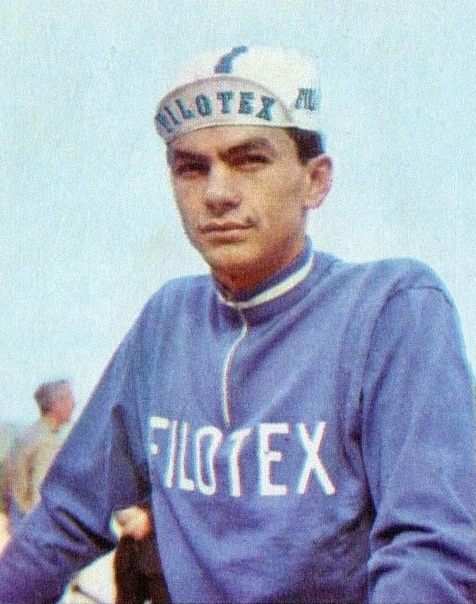
- Mugnaini in 1966

Personal information
- Full name: Guido Marcello Mugnaini
- Born: 12 November 1940 (age 85) Montemignaio, Italy

Cycling career
- Sport: Cycling
- Discipline: Road
- Role: Rider

Major wins
- 1 stage Tour de France

Guido Marcello Mugnaini (born 12 November 1940) is a retired Italian professional road bicycle racer.

== Major results ==
1964
Giro d'Italia:

Winner stage 8
7th place overall classification

1965
Giro d'Italia:

4th place overall classification

1966
Tour de France:

Winner stage 11
5th place overall classification

1967
Giro d'Italia:

Winner stage 21
