= Karl-Heinz Kunde =

German cyclist (1938–2018)

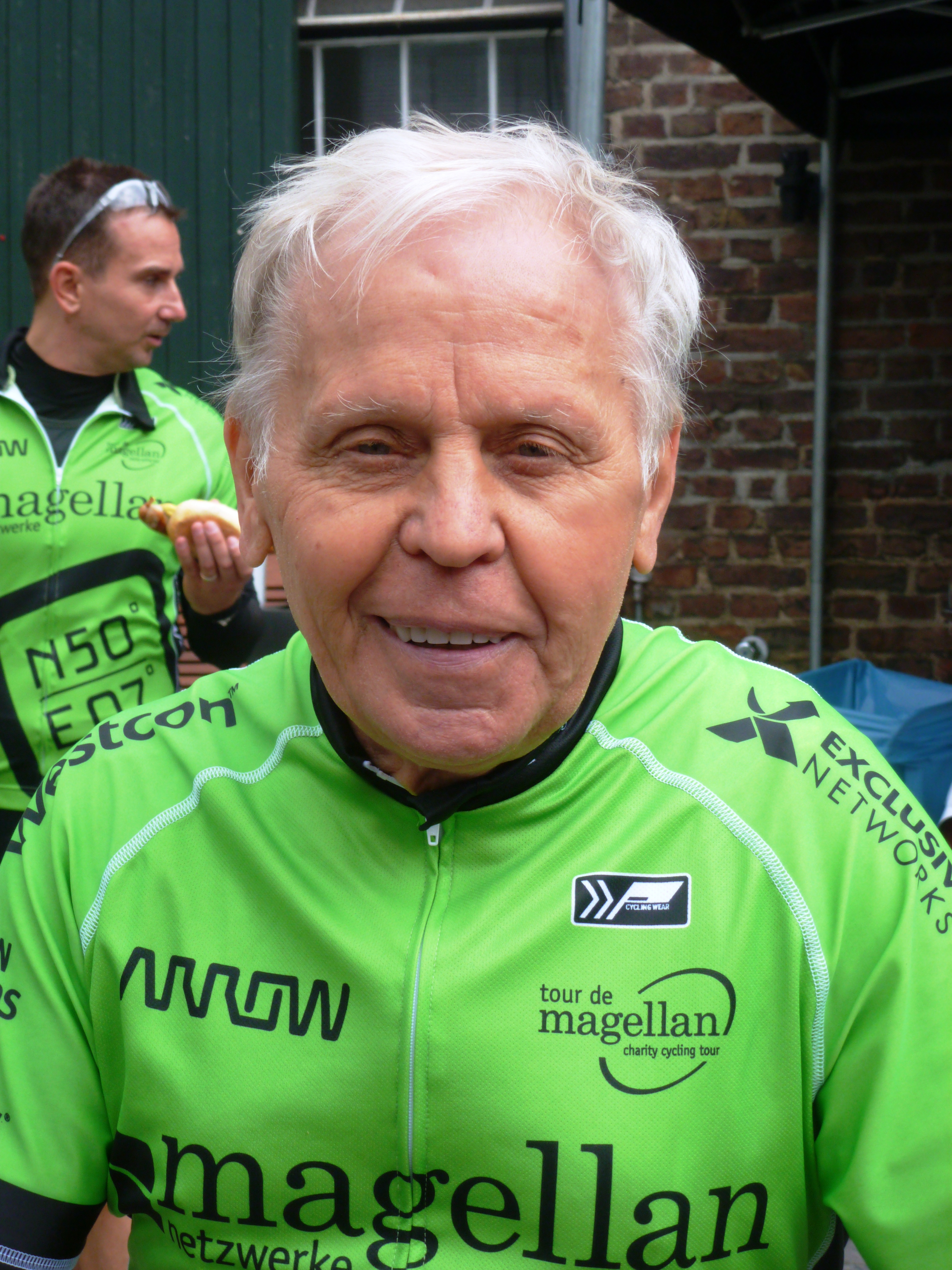
- Kunde in 2014

Personal information
- Full name: Karl-Heinz Kunde
- Born: 6 January 1938 Cologne, Germany
- Died: 15 January 2018 (aged 80)

Cycling career
- Sport: Cycling
- Disciplines: Track and road
- Role: Rider

Major wins
- 5 days yellow jersey

Karl-Heinz Kunde (6 January 1938 – 15 January 2018) was a German racing cyclist.

== Life ==
Born in Cologne, Kunde started his cycling career in 1959 as amateur. In 1962 he became professional. His biggest success was in the 1966 Tour de France, where he wore the yellow jersey for five days. This was even more special considering he received hardly any support from his teammates.

Kunde started 5 times in the Tour de France, but only finished three times, in 1964, 1965 and 1966. Because he was relatively small (1.59 m or 5 ft 3 in, and 50 kg or 110 lb), Kunde was nicknamed Bergfloh and Karl, der Kurze (Karl the short). The French reporters named him Le petit Kunde, and his concurrent Jacques Anquetil named him Mikrobe. Kunde was also a Cyclo-cross-cyclist. In 1973 Kunde ended his cycling career, and started a bicycle shop in Cologne.

== Palmarès ==
1960
Winner 4th stage Tour of Austria
1961
German national road race champion
1963
3rd stage Tour de Luxembourg
1964
Tour de France: 16th place final classification
1965
Tour de France: 11th place
1966
Tour de France: 9th place

== See also ==
- List of doping cases in cycling#1962
