= Willy Planckaert =

Belgian cyclist

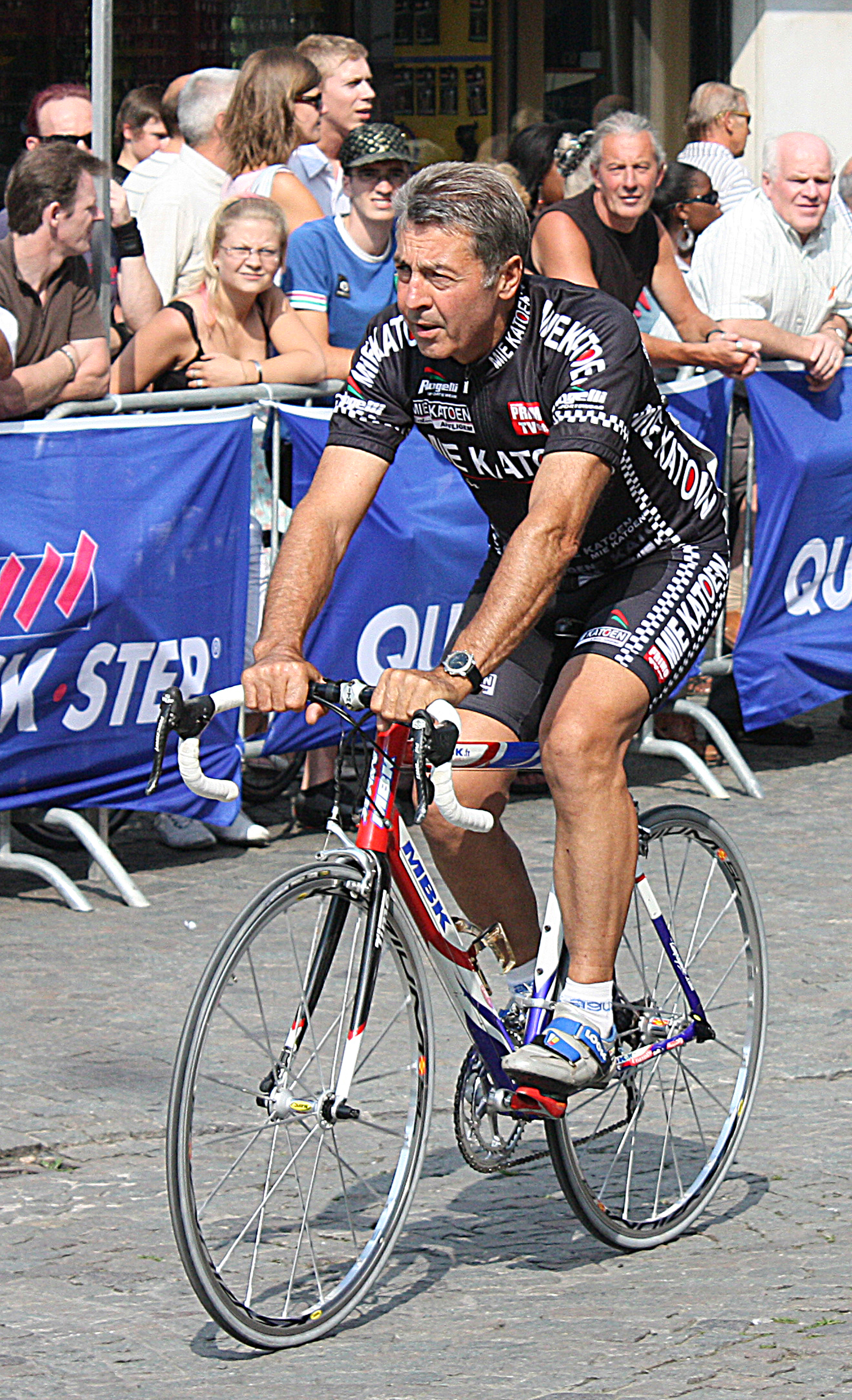
- Planckaert in 2008

Personal information
- Born: 5 April 1944 (age 82) Nevele, Belgium

Cycling career
- Sport: Cycling
- Current team: Retired
- Discipline: Road
- Role: Rider

Major wins
- Points classification, Tour de France (1966); Tour de France, 2 stages Giro d'Italia, 3 stages
Medal record
Representing Belgium
Men's road bicycle racing
World Championships
Silver medal – second place	1964 Sallanches	Amateur's Road Race

Willy Planckaert (born 5 April 1944 in Nevele) is a Belgian former road bicycle racer. His brothers, Eddy and Walter Planckaert, as well as his son Jo Planckaert, are also former professional road bicycle racers.

== Major results ==
1965
1st, Brussels-Charleroi-Brussels
1st, Stage 1, Paris–Luxembourg
1966
Points classification, Tour de France

1st, Stages 4 and 8

1st, Stage 2, Tour de Luxembourg
1967
1st, Grand Prix Pino Cerami
1st, Stages 5, 9 and 22b, Giro d'Italia
1969
1st, Stage 1, Tour de l'Oise
1970
1st, Stage 3b, Tour de Luxembourg
1973
1st, Stage 1, Tour de Luxembourg
1st, Stage 3, Four Days of Dunkirk
1974
1st, Omloop van de Vlaamse Scheldeboorden
1st, Omloop van het Houtland
1st, Stage 4, Tour de Pologne
1976
1st, Dwars door Vlaanderen
1st, Stage 1a, Critérium du Dauphiné Libéré
1st, Stage 5b, Four Days of Dunkirk
1977
1st, Overall, Étoile de Bessèges
1st, Stage 2, Four Days of Dunkirk

== See also ==
- Eddy Planckaert
- Walter Planckaert
- Jo Planckaert
