= Jos Huysmans =

Belgian cyclist

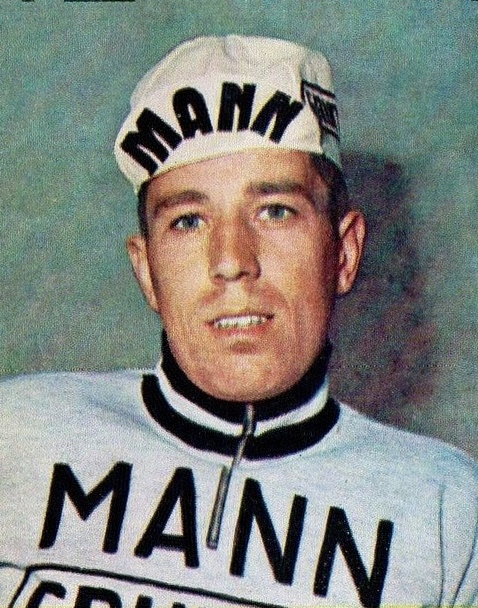
- Huysmans circa 1968

Personal information
- Full name: Jos Huysmans
- Born: 18 December 1941 Beerzel, Belgium
- Died: 10 October 2012 (aged 70)

Cycling career
- Sport: Cycling
- Current team: Retired
- Discipline: Road
- Role: Rider

Professional teams
- 1962–1969: Mann
- 1970: Faema
- 1971–1976: Molteni
- 1977: Fiat France

Jos Huysmans (18 December 1941 – 10 October 2012) was a Belgian professional road bicycle racer.

== Major results ==
1963
1st, Rummen
1964
1st, Bruxelles-Liège
1st, Stage 5a, Four Days of Dunkirk
1st, Stage 4a, Tour of Belgium
1st, Machelen
1965
1st, Brugg
1st, Bulle
2nd, Overall, Tour de Suisse
1st, Stage 1, Tour de Suisse
1st, Tienen
1st, Wetteren
1966
1st, Berlare
1st, De Panne, Criterium
1st, Heusden O-Vlaanderen
1st, Kessel–Lier
1st, Stage 1, Four Days of Dunkirk
3rd, Belgium National Road Championships
1st, Itegem
1967
1st, Stage 2b, Tour of Belgium (Team time trial)
1st, Ath
1st, Koksijde
8th, Overall, Tour de France
1st, Ronse
1st, Rijmenam
1st, Heusden O-Vlaanderen
1968
1st, GP Briek Schotte
1st, Kampioenschap van Vlaanderen
1st, Mandel-Leie-Schelde
1st, Nandrin
1st, Berlaar
1st, Tour du Condroz
Tour de France:

Winner stage 20

1969
1st, Stage 6a, Critérium du Dauphiné Libéré (FRA)
1st, Schaal Sels
1st, Stage 2b, Tour of Belgium (Team time trial)
2nd, Amstel Gold Race
1st, La Flèche Wallonne
1st, Reims-Ivoz-Ramet
1970
1st, Rijmenam
1st, Houtem
1971
1st, Berlaar
1972
1st, Onze-Lieve-Vrouw-Waver
2nd, Paris–Tours
Tour de France:

Winner stage 9

1973
1st, Stadsprijs Geraardsbergen
1st, Ulvenhout
1st, Ronse
1974
1st, Kessel–Lier
1975
1st, Kampioenschap van Vlaanderen
1976
1st, Humbeek
