= Smith's (cycling team) =

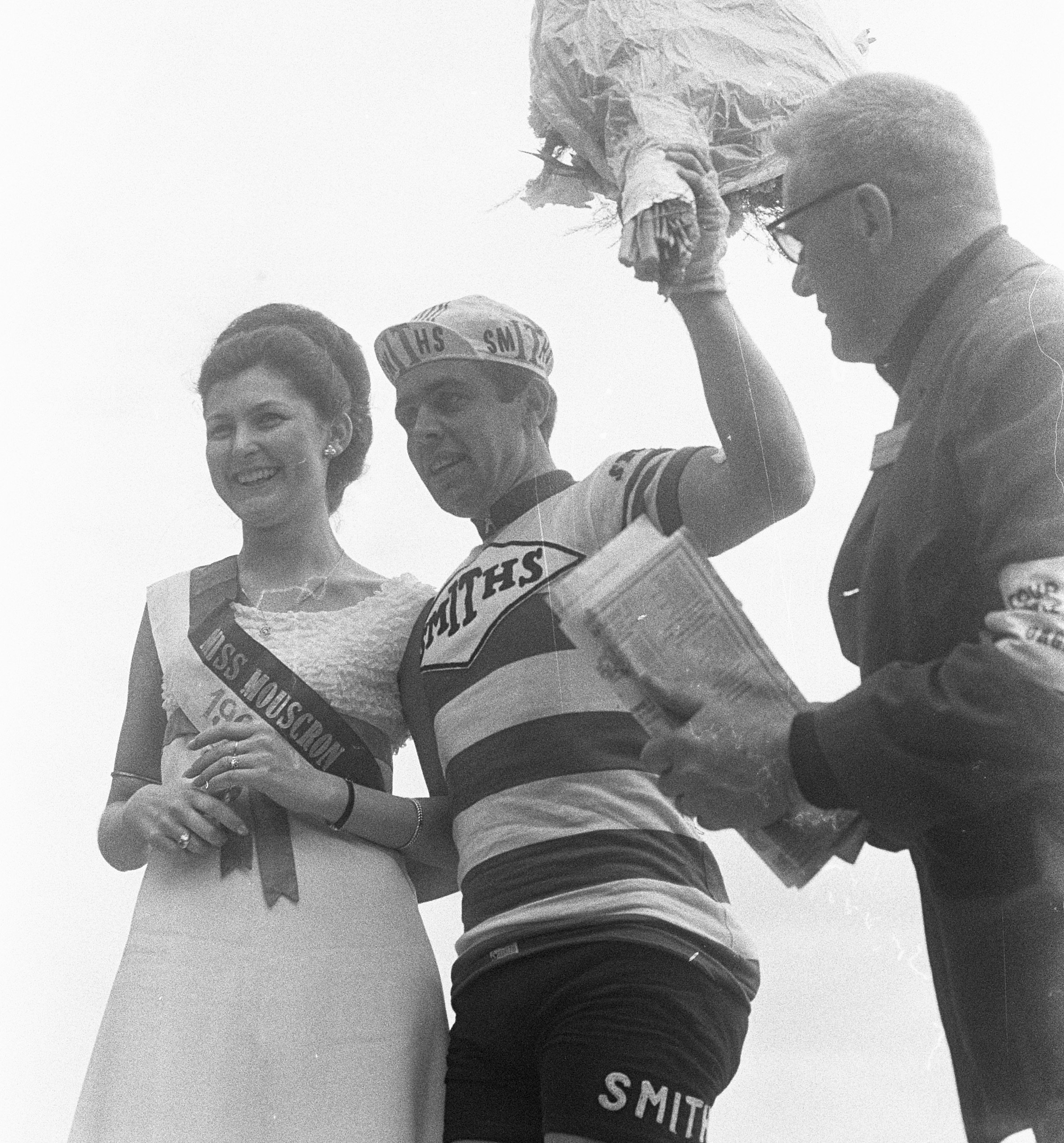
- Guido Reybrouck at the 1968 Tour de France

Team information
- Registered: Belgium
- Founded: 1966
- Disbanded: 1968
- Discipline: Road
- Bicycles: Plume Sport

Team name history
- 1966–1967 1968: Roméo–Smith's; Smith's
Smith's jersey
Jersey

Smith's was a Belgian professional cycling team that existed from 1966 to 1968. Its co-sponsor for the first two seasons and sole sponsor for the final season was the British company Smith's Potato Crisps.
