= Dr. Mann (cycling team) =

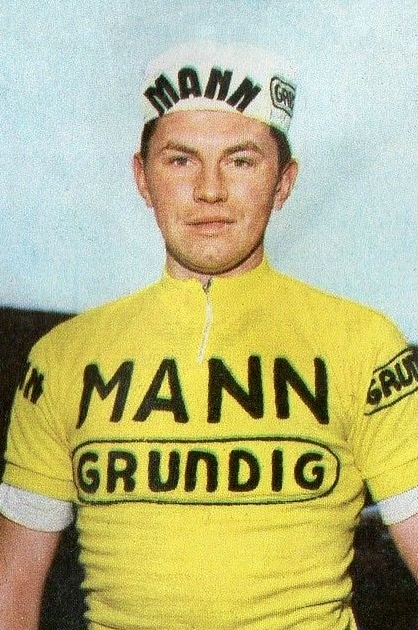
- Daniel Van Ryckeghem c. 1970

Team information
- Registered: Belgium
- Founded: 1960
- Disbanded: 1970
- Discipline: Road

Team name history
- 1960 1961 1962–1964 1965 1966–1970: Dr. Mann–Dossche Sport; Dr. Mann; Dr. Mann–Labo; Dr. Mann; Dr. Mann–Grundig
Dr. Mann jersey
Jersey

Dr. Mann was a Belgian professional cycling team that existed from 1960 to 1970. Its main sponsor was proprietary medicine producer Dr. Mann. Its most notable victory was Herman Van Springel's win of the 1968 Giro di Lombardia.
