= List of teams and cyclists in the 1965 Tour de France =

List of cyclists

The 1965 Tour de France started with 130 cyclists, divided into 13 teams of 10 cyclists:

- Ford France–Gitane–Dunlop
- Margnat–Paloma–Inuri–Dunlop
- Mercier–BP–Hutchinson
- Pelforth–Sauvage–Lejeune–Wolber
- Peugeot–BP–Michelin
- Flandria–Romeo
- Solo–Superia
- Wiel's–Groene Leeuw
- Televizier
- Ferrys
- Kas–Kaskol
- Molteni–Ignis
- Salvarani

The Molteni-Ignis team was a combined team, with 5 cyclists from Molteni and 5 from Ignis.

Jacques Anquetil, who won the previous four Tours de France (1961–1964), did not participate in this tour; this made Raymond Poulidor, who became second in the previous Tour, the main favourite.

== Start list ==
=== By team ===
Ford-France–Gitane–Dunlop
No.	Rider	Pos.
1	Lucien Aimar (FRA)	DNF
2	Arie den Hartog (NED)	DNF
3	Vin Denson (GBR)	87
4	Pierre Everaert (FRA)	DNF
5	Michel Grain (FRA)	83
6	Jean-Claude Lebaube (FRA)	5
7	Cees Lute (NED)	67
8	Pierre Martin (FRA)	DNF
9	Anatole Novak (FRA)	66
10	Louis Rostollan (FRA)	20

Margnat–Paloma–Inuri–Dunlop
No.	Rider	Pos.
11	Jacques Bachelot (FRA)	62
12	Federico Bahamontes (ESP)	DNF
13	Gilbert Bellone (FRA)	DNF
14	André Darrigade (FRA)	93
15	Ginés García (ESP)	27
16	Albertus Geldermans (NED)	DNF
17	Hans Junkermann (FRG)	28
18	François Le Her (FRA)	88
19	Raymond Mastrotto (FRA)	38
20	Jean Milesi (FRA)	94

Mercier–BP–Hutchinson
No.	Rider	Pos.
21	Frans Aerenhouts (BEL)	61
22	Jean-Louis Bodin (FRA)	33
23	Robert Cazala (FRA)	64
24	Georges Chappe (FRA)	DNF
25	Jean Gainche (FRA)	71
26	Jean-Pierre Genet (FRA)	75
27	Raymond Poulidor (FRA)	2
28	Roger Swerts (BEL)	40
29	Victor Van Schil (BEL)	41
30	Rolf Wolfshohl (FRG)	DNF

Pelforth–Sauvage–Lejeune–Wolber
No.	Rider	Pos.
31	Henry Anglade (FRA)	4
32	Hubert Ferrer (FRA)	92
33	André Foucher (FRA)	18
34	Georges Groussard (FRA)	DNF
35	Joseph Groussard (FRA)	96
36	Jan Janssen (NED)	9
37	Jean-Claude Lefebvre (FRA)	82
38	François Mahé (FRA)	43
39	Willy Monty (BEL)	42
40	Johny Schleck (LUX)	52

Peugeot–BP–Michelin
No.	Rider	Pos.
41	Ferdinand Bracke (BEL)	DNF
42	Raymond Delisle (FRA)	DNF
43	Henri Duez (FRA)	14
44	Désiré Letort (FRA)	DNF
45	Michel Nédélec (FRA)	DNF
46	Roger Pingeon (FRA)	12
47	Tom Simpson (GBR)	DNF
48	Angelino Soler (ESP)	22
49	Georges Van Coningsloo (FRA)	DNF
50	André Zimmermann (FRA)	17

Flandria–Romeo
No.	Rider	Pos.
51	Walter Boucquet (BEL)	21
52	Willy Bocklant (BEL)	DNF
53	Frans Brands (BEL)	8
54	Julien Haelterman (BEL)	DNF
55	Yvo Molenaers (BEL)	81
56	Peter Post (NED)	DNF
57	Guido Reybrouck (BEL)	54
58	Georges Vandenberghe (BEL)	39
59	Roland Van De Rijse (BEL)	59
60	Guillaume Van Tongerloo (BEL)	80

Solo–Superia
No.	Rider	Pos.
61	Armand Desmet (BEL)	DNF
62	Noël De Pauw (BEL)	72
63	Henri Dewolf (BEL)	60
64	Jef Planckaert (BEL)	56
65	Edward Sels (BEL)	DNF
66	Edgar Sorgeloos (BEL)	84
67	Julien Stevens (BEL)	DNF
68	Michel Van Aerde (BEL)	35
69	Bernard Van de Kerckhove (BEL)	DNF
70	Rik Van Looy (BEL)	31

Wiel's–Groene Leeuw
No.	Rider	Pos.
71	Benoni Beheyt (BEL)	47
72	Gilbert Desmet (BEL)	16
73	Gilbert De Smet (BEL)	48
74	Gustave De Smet (BEL)	DNF
75	Karl-Heinz Kunde (FRG)	11
76	Eddy Pauwels (BEL)	DNF
77	Dieter Puschel (FRG)	DNF
78	Jozef Timmermann (BEL)	69
79	Auguste Verhaegen (BEL)	45
80	Michael Wright (GBR)	24

Televizier
No.	Rider	Pos.
81	Jo de Haan (NED)	77
82	Johan De Roo (NED)	55
83	Cees Haast (NED)	DNF
84	Huub Harings (NED)	32
85	Gerben Karstens (NED)	57
86	Bas Maliepaard (NED)	51
87	Henk Nijdam (NED)	50
88	Léo van Dongen (NED)	90
89	Cees van Espen (NED)	DNF
90	Rik Wouters (NED)	29

Ferrys
No.	Rider	Pos.
91	Fernando Manzaneque (ESP)	25
92	Antonio Bertrán (ESP)	85
93	Eduardo Castelló (ESP)	44
94	Rogelio Hernández (ESP)	76
95	Esteban Martín (ESP)	65
96	Ramón Mendiburu (ESP)	DNF
97	Luis Otaño (ESP)	30
98	José Pérez Francés (ESP)	6
99	Raúl Rey (ESP)	95
100	Juan García Such (ESP)	DNF

KAS–Kaskol
No.	Rider	Pos.
101	Carlos Echeverría (ESP)	53
102	Sebastián Elorza (ESP)	26
103	Francisco Gabica (ESP)	10
104	Joaquín Galera (ESP)	37
105	Antonio Gómez del Moral (ESP)	DNF
106	Julio Jiménez (ESP)	23
107	José Antonio Momeñe (ESP)	34
108	Juan José Sagarduy (ESP)	46
109	Valentín Uriona (ESP)	13
110	Eusebio Vélez (ESP)	DNF

Molteni/Ignis
No.	Rider	Pos.
111	René Binggeli (SUI)	49
112	Guido De Rosso (ITA)	7
113	Giacomo Fornoni (ITA)	89
114	Giuseppe Fezzardi (ITA)	36
115	Gianni Motta (ITA)	3
116	Ambrogio Colombo (ITA)	78
117	Adriano Durante (ITA)	73
118	Renzo Fontona (ITA)	15
119	Ambrogio Portalupi (ITA)	63
120	Remo Stefanoni (ITA)	74

Salvarani
No.	Rider	Pos.
121	Vittorio Adorni (ITA)	DNF
122	Francis Blanc (SUI)	79
123	Felice Gimondi (ITA)	1
124	Italo Mazzacurati (ITA)	68
125	Mario Minieri (ITA)	91
126	Diego Ronchini (ITA)	86
127	Arnaldo Pambianco (ITA)	19
128	Pietro Partesotti (ITA)	58
129	Gilberto Vendemiati (ITA)	70
130	Roland Zöffel (SUI)	DNF

=== By rider ===
Legend
No.	Starting number worn by the rider during the Tour
Pos.	Position in the general classification
DNF	Denotes a rider who did not finish

No.	Name	Nationality	Team	Pos.	Ref
1	Lucien Aimar	France	Ford-France–Gitane–Dunlop	DNF	
2	Arie den Hartog	Netherlands	Ford-France–Gitane–Dunlop	DNF	
3	Vin Denson	Great Britain	Ford-France–Gitane–Dunlop	87	
4	Pierre Everaert	France	Ford-France–Gitane–Dunlop	DNF	
5	Michel Grain	France	Ford-France–Gitane–Dunlop	83	
6	Jean-Claude Lebaube	France	Ford-France–Gitane–Dunlop	5	
7	Cees Lute	Netherlands	Ford-France–Gitane–Dunlop	67	
8	Pierre Martin	France	Ford-France–Gitane–Dunlop	DNF	
9	Anatole Novak	France	Ford-France–Gitane–Dunlop	66	
10	Louis Rostollan	France	Ford-France–Gitane–Dunlop	20	
11	Jacques Bachelot	France	Margnat–Paloma–Inuri–Dunlop	62	
12	Federico Bahamontes	Spain	Margnat–Paloma–Inuri–Dunlop	DNF	
13	Gilbert Bellone	France	Margnat–Paloma–Inuri–Dunlop	DNF	
14	André Darrigade	France	Margnat–Paloma–Inuri–Dunlop	93	
15	Gines García	Spain	Margnat–Paloma–Inuri–Dunlop	27	
16	Albertus Geldermans	Netherlands	Margnat–Paloma–Inuri–Dunlop	DNF	
17	Hans Junkermann	West Germany	Margnat–Paloma–Inuri–Dunlop	28	
18	François Le Her	France	Margnat–Paloma–Inuri–Dunlop	88	
19	Raymond Mastrotto	France	Margnat–Paloma–Inuri–Dunlop	38	
20	Jean Milesi	France	Margnat–Paloma–Inuri–Dunlop	94	
21	Frans Aerenhouts	Belgium	Mercier–BP–Hutchinson	61	
22	Jean-Louis Bodin	France	Mercier–BP–Hutchinson	33	
23	Robert Cazala	France	Mercier–BP–Hutchinson	64	
24	Georges Chappe	France	Mercier–BP–Hutchinson	DNF	
25	Jean Gainche	France	Mercier–BP–Hutchinson	71	
26	Jean-Pierre Genet	France	Mercier–BP–Hutchinson	75	
27	Raymond Poulidor	France	Mercier–BP–Hutchinson	2	
28	Roger Swerts	Belgium	Mercier–BP–Hutchinson	40	
29	Victor Van Schil	Belgium	Mercier–BP–Hutchinson	41	
30	Rolf Wolfshohl	West Germany	Mercier–BP–Hutchinson	DNF	
31	Henry Anglade	France	Pelforth–Sauvage–Lejeune–Wolber	4	
32	Hubert Ferrer	France	Pelforth–Sauvage–Lejeune–Wolber	92	
33	André Foucher	France	Pelforth–Sauvage–Lejeune–Wolber	18	
34	Georges Groussard	France	Pelforth–Sauvage–Lejeune–Wolber	DNF	
35	Joseph Groussard	France	Pelforth–Sauvage–Lejeune–Wolber	96	
36	Jan Janssen	Netherlands	Pelforth–Sauvage–Lejeune–Wolber	9	
37	Jean-Claude Lefebvre	France	Pelforth–Sauvage–Lejeune–Wolber	82	
38	François Mahé	France	Pelforth–Sauvage–Lejeune–Wolber	43	
39	Willy Monty	Belgium	Pelforth–Sauvage–Lejeune–Wolber	42	
40	Johny Schleck	Luxembourg	Pelforth–Sauvage–Lejeune–Wolber	52	
41	Ferdinand Bracke	Belgium	Peugeot–BP–Michelin	DNF	
42	Raymond Delisle	France	Peugeot–BP–Michelin	DNF	
43	Henri Duez	France	Peugeot–BP–Michelin	14	
44	Désiré Letort	France	Peugeot–BP–Michelin	DNF	
45	Michel Nédélec	France	Peugeot–BP–Michelin	DNF	
46	Roger Pingeon	France	Peugeot–BP–Michelin	12	
47	Tom Simpson	Great Britain	Peugeot–BP–Michelin	DNF	
48	Angelino Soler	Spain	Peugeot–BP–Michelin	22	
49	Georges Van Coningsloo	France	Peugeot–BP–Michelin	DNF	
50	André Zimmermann	France	Peugeot–BP–Michelin	17	
51	Walter Boucquet	Belgium	Flandria–Romeo	21	
52	Willy Bocklant	Belgium	Flandria–Romeo	DNF	
53	Frans Brands	Belgium	Flandria–Romeo	8	
54	Julien Haelterman	Belgium	Flandria–Romeo	DNF	
55	Yvo Molenaers	Belgium	Flandria–Romeo	81	
56	Peter Post	Netherlands	Flandria–Romeo	DNF	
57	Guido Reybrouck	Belgium	Flandria–Romeo	54	
58	Georges Vandenberghe	Belgium	Flandria–Romeo	39	
59	Roland Van De Rijse	Belgium	Flandria–Romeo	59	
60	Guillaume Van Tongerloo	Belgium	Flandria–Romeo	80	
61	Armand Desmet	Belgium	Solo–Superia	DNF	
62	Noël De Pauw	Belgium	Solo–Superia	72	
63	Henri Dewolf	Belgium	Solo–Superia	60	
64	Jef Planckaert	Belgium	Solo–Superia	56	
65	Edward Sels	Belgium	Solo–Superia	DNF	
66	Edgar Sorgeloos	Belgium	Solo–Superia	84	
67	Julien Stevens	Belgium	Solo–Superia	DNF	
68	Michel Van Aerde	Belgium	Solo–Superia	35	
69	Bernard Van de Kerckhove	Belgium	Solo–Superia	DNF	
70	Rik Van Looy	Belgium	Solo–Superia	31	
71	Benoni Beheyt	Belgium	Wiel's–Groene Leeuw	47	
72	Gilbert Desmet	Belgium	Wiel's–Groene Leeuw	16	
73	Gilbert De Smet	Belgium	Wiel's–Groene Leeuw	48	
74	Gustave De Smet	Belgium	Wiel's–Groene Leeuw	DNF	
75	Karl-Heinz Kunde	West Germany	Wiel's–Groene Leeuw	11	
76	Eddy Pauwels	Belgium	Wiel's–Groene Leeuw	DNF	
77	Dieter Puschel	West Germany	Wiel's–Groene Leeuw	DNF	
78	Jozef Timmermann	Belgium	Wiel's–Groene Leeuw	69	
79	Auguste Verhaegen	Belgium	Wiel's–Groene Leeuw	45	
80	Michael Wright	Great Britain	Wiel's–Groene Leeuw	24	
81	Jo de Haan	Netherlands	Televizier	77	
82	Johan De Roo	Netherlands	Televizier	55	
83	Cees Haast	Netherlands	Televizier	DNF	
84	Huub Harings	Netherlands	Televizier	32	
85	Gerben Karstens	Netherlands	Televizier	57	
86	Bas Maliepaard	Netherlands	Televizier	51	
87	Henk Nijdam	Netherlands	Televizier	50	
88	Léo van Dongen	Netherlands	Televizier	90	
89	Cees van Espen	Netherlands	Televizier	DNF	
90	Rik Wouters	Netherlands	Televizier	29	
91	Fernando Manzaneque	Spain	Ferrys	25	
92	Antonio Bertrán	Spain	Ferrys	85	
93	Eduardo Castelló	Spain	Ferrys	44	
94	Rogelio Hernández	Spain	Ferrys	76	
95	Esteban Martín	Spain	Ferrys	65	
96	Ramón Mendiburu	Spain	Ferrys	DNF	
97	Luis Otaño	Spain	Ferrys	30	
98	José Pérez Francés	Spain	Ferrys	6	
99	Raúl Rey	Spain	Ferrys	95	
100	Juan García Such	Spain	Ferrys	DNF	
101	Carlos Echeverría	Spain	KAS–Kaskol	53	
102	Sebastián Elorza	Spain	KAS–Kaskol	26	
103	Francisco Gabica	Spain	KAS–Kaskol	10	
104	Joaquín Galera	Spain	KAS–Kaskol	37	
105	Antonio Gómez del Moral	Spain	KAS–Kaskol	DNF	
106	Julio Jiménez	Spain	KAS–Kaskol	23	
107	José Antonio Momeñe	Spain	KAS–Kaskol	34	
108	Juan José Sagarduy	Spain	KAS–Kaskol	46	
109	Valentín Uriona	Spain	KAS–Kaskol	13	
110	Eusebio Vélez	Spain	KAS–Kaskol	DNF	
111	René Binggeli	Switzerland	Molteni/Ignis	49	
112	Guido De Rosso	Italy	Molteni/Ignis	7	
113	Giacomo Fornoni	Italy	Molteni/Ignis	89	
114	Giuseppe Fezzardi	Italy	Molteni/Ignis	36	
115	Gianni Motta	Italy	Molteni/Ignis	3	
116	Ambrogio Colombo	Italy	Molteni/Ignis	78	
117	Adriano Durante	Italy	Molteni/Ignis	73	
118	Renzo Fontona	Italy	Molteni/Ignis	15	
119	Ambrogio Portalupi	Italy	Molteni/Ignis	63	
120	Remo Stefanoni	Italy	Molteni/Ignis	74	
121	Vittorio Adorni	Italy	Salvarani	DNF	
122	Francis Blanc	Switzerland	Salvarani	79	
123	Felice Gimondi	Italy	Salvarani	1	
124	Italo Mazzacurati	Italy	Salvarani	68	
125	Mario Minieri	Italy	Salvarani	91	
126	Diego Ronchini	Italy	Salvarani	86	
127	Arnaldo Pambianco	Italy	Salvarani	19	
128	Pietro Partesotti	Italy	Salvarani	58	
129	Gilberto Vendemiati	Italy	Salvarani	70	
130	Roland Zöffel	Switzerland	Salvarani	DNF	
