= 1965 Tour de France, Stage 1a to Stage 10 =

Cycling race stages

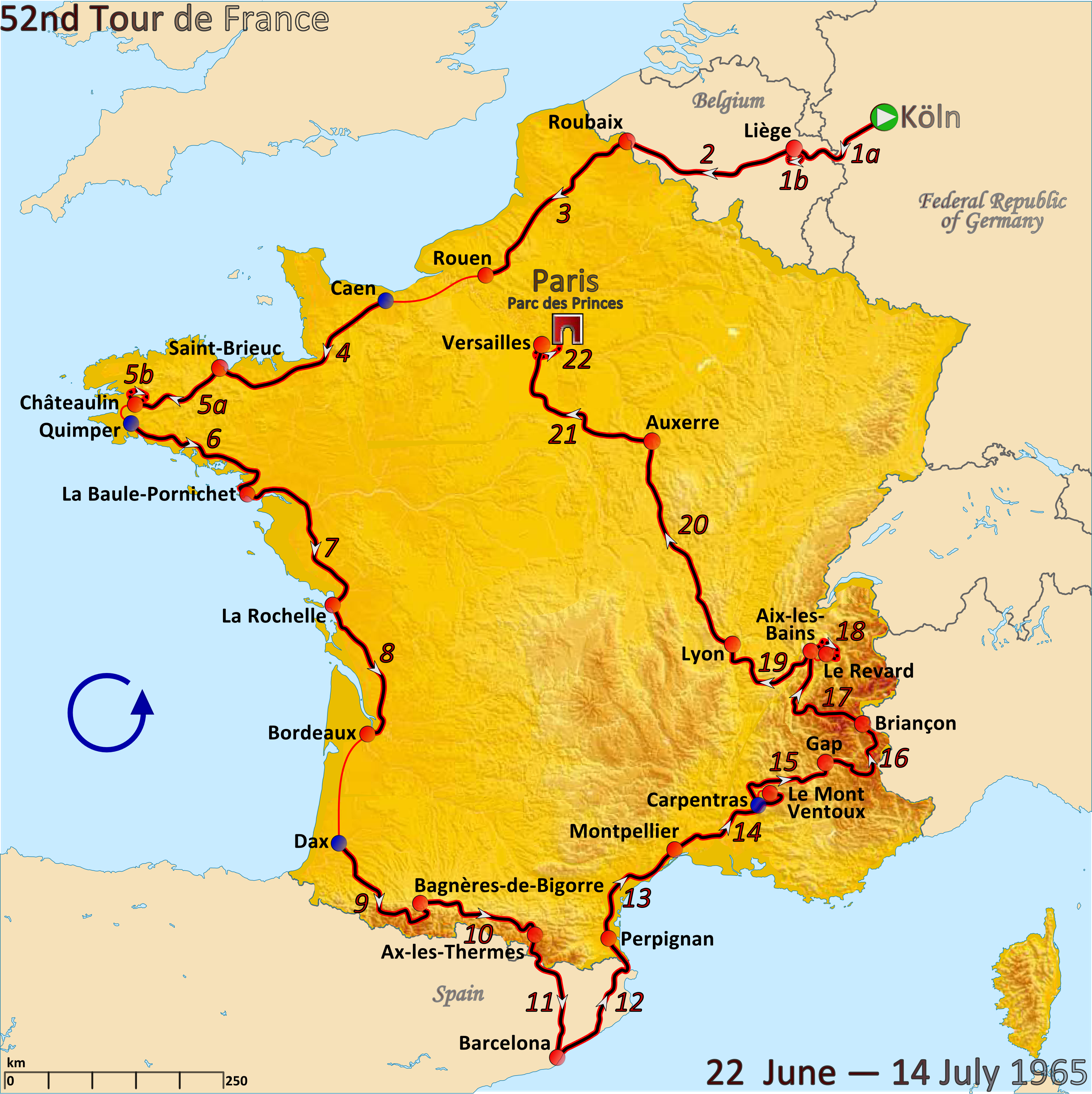
Route of the 1965 Tour de France

The 1965 Tour de France was the 52nd edition of Tour de France, one of cycling's Grand Tours. The Tour began in Cologne with a flat stage on 22 June and Stage 10 occurred on 1 July with a mountainous stage to Ax-les-Thermes. The race finished in Paris on 14 July.

== Stage 1a ==
22 June 1965 - Cologne to Liège, 149 km (92.6 mi)

Stage 1a result and General Classification after Stage 1a

	Rider	Team	Time
1	Rik Van Looy (BEL)	Solo–Superia	4h 06' 49"
2	Georges Vandenberghe (BEL)	Flandria–Romeo	s.t.
3	Edward Sels (BEL)	Solo–Superia	s.t.
4	Johan De Roo (NED)	Televizier	s.t.
5	Bernard Van de Kerckhove (BEL)	Solo–Superia	s.t.
6	Benoni Beheyt (BEL)	Wiel's–Groene Leeuw	s.t.
7	Gianni Motta (ITA)	Molteni	s.t.
8	Julien Haelterman (BEL)	Flandria–Romeo	s.t.
9	Guido Reybrouck (BEL)	Flandria–Romeo	s.t.
10	Jan Janssen (NED)	Pelforth–Sauvage–Lejeune	s.t.

== Stage 1b ==
22 June 1965 - Liège, 22.5 km (14.0 mi) (TTT)

Stage 1b result

Rank	Team	Time
1	Ford France–Gitane	1h 28' 12"
2	Peugeot–BP–Michelin	+ 3"
3	Solo–Superia	+ 18"
4	Pelforth–Sauvage–Lejeune	+ 42"
5	Televizier	+ 57"
6	Salvarani	+ 1' 27"
7	Mercier–BP–Hutchinson	+ 1' 33"
8	Wiel's–Groene Leeuw	+ 2' 12"
9	Margnat–Paloma–Inuri–Dunlop	+ 3' 15"
10	Flandria–Romeo	+ 5' 00"

General classification after stage 1b

Rank	Rider	Team	Time
1	Rik Van Looy (BEL)	Solo–Superia	4h 35' 19"
2	Arie den Hartog (NED)	Ford France–Gitane	+ 54"
3	Lucien Aimar (FRA)	Ford France–Gitane	s.t.
4	Louis Rostollan (FRA)	Ford France–Gitane	s.t.
5	Anatole Novak (FRA)	Ford France–Gitane	s.t.
6	Jean-Claude Lebaube (FRA)	Ford France–Gitane	s.t.
7	Pierre Martin (FRA)	Ford France–Gitane	s.t.
8	Michel Grain (FRA)	Ford France–Gitane	s.t.
9	Pierre Everaert (FRA)	Ford France–Gitane	s.t.
10	Tom Simpson (GBR)	Peugeot–BP–Michelin	+ 55"

== Stage 2 ==
23 June 1965 - Liège to Roubaix, 200.5 km (124.6 mi)

Stage 2 result

Rank	Rider	Team	Time
1	Bernard Van de Kerckhove (BEL)	Solo–Superia	5h 27' 45"
2	Felice Gimondi (ITA)	Salvarani	s.t.
3	Victor Van Schil (BEL)	Mercier–BP–Hutchinson	s.t.
4	Guido Reybrouck (BEL)	Flandria–Romeo	+ 14"
5	Vittorio Adorni (ITA)	Salvarani	s.t.
6	Jan Janssen (NED)	Pelforth–Sauvage–Lejeune	s.t.
7	Julien Stevens (BEL)	Solo–Superia	s.t.
8	Walter Boucquet (BEL)	Flandria–Romeo	s.t.
9	Rik Wouters (NED)	Televizier	s.t.
10	Arie den Hartog (NED)	Ford France–Gitane	s.t.

General classification after stage 2

Rank	Rider	Team	Time
1	Bernard Van de Kerckhove (BEL)	Solo–Superia	10h 03' 04"
2	Felice Gimondi (ITA)	Salvarani	+ 53"
3	Arie den Hartog (NED)	Ford France–Gitane	+ 1' 08"
4	Julien Stevens (BEL)	Solo–Superia	+ 1' 14"
5	Rik Van Looy (BEL)	Solo–Superia	+ 1' 19"
6	Jan Janssen (NED)	Pelforth–Sauvage–Lejeune	+ 1' 22"
7	Cees Haast (NED)	Televizier	+ 1' 27"
8	Vittorio Adorni (ITA)	Salvarani	+ 1' 37"
9	Gilbert Desmet (BEL)	Wiel's–Groene Leeuw	+ 1' 52"
10	Lucien Aimar (FRA)	Ford France–Gitane	+ 2' 13"

== Stage 3 ==
24 June 1965 - Roubaix to Rouen, 240 km (150 mi)

Stage 3 result

Rank	Rider	Team	Time
1	Felice Gimondi (ITA)	Salvarani	7h 06' 18"
2	Michael Wright (GBR)	Wiel's–Groene Leeuw	+ 2"
3	Walter Boucquet (BEL)	Flandria–Romeo	+ 5"
4	Willy Monty (BEL)	Pelforth–Sauvage–Lejeune	s.t.
5	Cees Haast (NED)	Televizier	s.t.
6	André Darrigade (FRA)	Margnat–Paloma–Inuri–Dunlop	s.t.
7	Roger Pingeon (FRA)	Peugeot–BP–Michelin	+ 7"
8	Rogelio Hernández (ESP)	Ferrys	+ 8"
9	Valentín Uriona (ESP)	Kas–Kaskol	+ 9"
10	Ferdinand Bracke (BEL)	Peugeot–BP–Michelin	s.t.

General classification after stage 3

Rank	Rider	Team	Time
1	Felice Gimondi (ITA)	Salvarani	17h 09' 15"
2	Bernard Van de Kerckhove (BEL)	Solo–Superia	+ 39"
3	Cees Haast (NED)	Televizier	+ 1' 39"
4	Arie den Hartog (NED)	Ford France–Gitane	+ 1' 47"
5	Julien Stevens (BEL)	Solo–Superia	+ 1' 53"
6	Rik Van Looy (BEL)	Solo–Superia	+ 1' 58"
7	Jan Janssen (NED)	Pelforth–Sauvage–Lejeune	+ 2' 01"
8	Vittorio Adorni (ITA)	Salvarani	+ 2' 16"
9	Roger Pingeon (FRA)	Peugeot–BP–Michelin	+ 2' 28"
10	Ferdinand Bracke (BEL)	Peugeot–BP–Michelin	+ 2' 30"

== Stage 4 ==
25 June 1965 - Caen to Saint-Brieuc, 227 km (141 mi)

Stage 4 result

Rank	Rider	Team	Time
1	Edgar Sorgeloos (BEL)	Solo–Superia	6h 24' 43"
2	Cees Lute (NED)	Ford France–Gitane	s.t.
3	Willy Monty (BEL)	Pelforth–Sauvage–Lejeune	s.t.
4	Henk Nijdam (NED)	Televizier	s.t.
5	Walter Boucquet (BEL)	Flandria–Romeo	s.t.
6	Tom Simpson (GBR)	Peugeot–BP–Michelin	+ 33"
7	Jan Janssen (NED)	Pelforth–Sauvage–Lejeune	s.t.
8	Guido Reybrouck (BEL)	Flandria–Romeo	s.t.
9	Julien Haelterman (BEL)	Flandria–Romeo	s.t.
10	Benoni Beheyt (BEL)	Wiel's–Groene Leeuw	s.t.

General classification after stage 4

Rank	Rider	Team	Time
1	Felice Gimondi (ITA)	Salvarani	23h 34' 21"
2	Bernard Van de Kerckhove (BEL)	Solo–Superia	+ 39"
3	Edgar Sorgeloos (BEL)	Solo–Superia	+ 1' 25"
4	Cees Haast (NED)	Televizier	+ 1' 39"
5	Arie den Hartog (NED)	Ford France–Gitane	+ 1' 47"
6	Julien Stevens (BEL)	Solo–Superia	+ 1' 53"
7	Rik Van Looy (BEL)	Solo–Superia	+ 1' 58"
8	Jan Janssen (NED)	Pelforth–Sauvage–Lejeune	+ 2' 01"
9	Willy Monty (BEL)	Pelforth–Sauvage–Lejeune	+ 2' 06"
10	Vittorio Adorni (ITA)	Salvarani	+ 2' 16"

== Stage 5a ==
26 June 1965 - Saint-Brieuc to Châteaulin, 147 km (91 mi)

Stage 5a result

Rank	Rider	Team	Time
1	Cees van Espen (NED)	Televizier	3h 35' 39"
2	Léo van Dongen (NED)	Televizier	+ 39"
3	Michel Van Aerde (BEL)	Solo–Superia	+ 50"
4	Frans Brands (BEL)	Flandria–Romeo	s.t.
5	Pierre Everaert (FRA)	Ford France–Gitane	s.t.
6	Henk Nijdam (NED)	Televizier	+ 1' 56"
7	Auguste Verhaegen (BEL)	Wiel's–Groene Leeuw	+ 2' 09"
8	Julien Haelterman (BEL)	Flandria–Romeo	s.t.
9	Johan De Roo (NED)	Televizier	s.t.
10	Gerben Karstens (NED)	Televizier	s.t.

General classification after stage 5a

Rank	Rider	Team	Time
1	Felice Gimondi (ITA)	Salvarani	27h 12' 09"
2	Cees van Espen (NED)	Televizier	+ 23"
3	Bernard Van de Kerckhove (BEL)	Solo–Superia	+ 39"
4	Edgar Sorgeloos (BEL)	Solo–Superia	+ 1' 25"
5	Pierre Everaert (FRA)	Ford France–Gitane	+ 1' 33"
6	Michel Van Aerde (BEL)	Solo–Superia	+ 1' 39"
7	Cees Haast (NED)	Televizier	s.t.
8	Arie den Hartog (NED)	Ford France–Gitane	+ 1' 47"
9	Julien Stevens (BEL)	Solo–Superia	+ 1' 53"
10	Rik Van Looy (BEL)	Solo–Superia	+ 1' 58"

== Stage 5b ==
26 June 1965 - Châteaulin, 26.7 km (16.6 mi) (ITT)

Stage 5b result

Rank	Rider	Team	Time
1	Raymond Poulidor (FRA)	Mercier–BP–Hutchinson	37' 43"
2	Felice Gimondi (ITA)	Salvarani	+ 7"
3	Gianni Motta (ITA)	Molteni	+ 19"
4	Ferdinand Bracke (BEL)	Peugeot–BP–Michelin	+ 24"
5	Vittorio Adorni (ITA)	Salvarani	+ 30"
6	Valentín Uriona (ESP)	Kas–Kaskol	+ 1' 01"
7	Francisco Gabica (ESP)	Kas–Kaskol	+ 1' 15"
8	Jef Planckaert (BEL)	Solo–Superia	+ 1' 17"
9	Antonio Gómez del Moral (ESP)	Kas–Kaskol	+ 1' 20"
10	Guido De Rosso (ITA)	Molteni	+ 1' 22"

General classification after stage 5b

Rank	Rider	Team	Time
1	Felice Gimondi (ITA)	Salvarani	27h 49' 49"
2	Bernard Van de Kerckhove (BEL)	Solo–Superia	+ 2' 20"
3	Vittorio Adorni (ITA)	Salvarani	+ 2' 49"
4	Ferdinand Bracke (BEL)	Peugeot–BP–Michelin	+ 2' 57"
5	Raymond Poulidor (FRA)	Mercier–BP–Hutchinson	+ 3' 06"
6	Cees van Espen (NED)	Televizier	+ 3' 21"
7	Jan Janssen (NED)	Pelforth–Sauvage–Lejeune	+ 3' 29"
8	Arie den Hartog (NED)	Ford France–Gitane	s.t.
9	Julien Stevens (BEL)	Solo–Superia	+ 3' 32"
10	Cees Haast (NED)	Televizier	+ 3' 49"

== Stage 6 ==
27 June 1965 - Quimper to La Baule, 210.5 km (130.8 mi)

The finishing times were recorded at the entry to La Baule velodrome.

Stage 6 result

Rank	Rider	Team	Time
1	Guido Reybrouck (BEL)	Flandria–Romeo	4h 51' 19"
2	Roger Swerts (BEL)	Pelforth–Sauvage–Lejeune	s.t.
3	Johan De Roo (NED)	Televizier	s.t.
4	Adriano Durante (ITA)	Molteni	s.t.
5	Léo van Dongen (NED)	Televizier	s.t.
6	Jan Janssen (NED)	Pelforth–Sauvage–Lejeune	s.t.
7	Julien Haelterman (BEL)	Flandria–Romeo	s.t.
8	Edward Sels (BEL)	Solo–Superia	4h 51' 15"
9	Rik Van Looy (BEL)	Solo–Superia	4h 51' 19"
10	Benoni Beheyt (BEL)	Wiel's–Groene Leeuw	s.t.

General classification after stage 6

Rank	Rider	Team	Time
1	Felice Gimondi (ITA)	Salvarani	32h 41' 08"
2	Bernard Van de Kerckhove (BEL)	Solo–Superia	+ 2' 20"
3	Vittorio Adorni (ITA)	Salvarani	+ 2' 49"
4	Ferdinand Bracke (BEL)	Peugeot–BP–Michelin	+ 2' 57"
5	Raymond Poulidor (FRA)	Mercier–BP–Hutchinson	+ 3' 06"
6	Cees van Espen (NED)	Televizier	+ 3' 21"
7	Jan Janssen (NED)	Pelforth–Sauvage–Lejeune	+ 3' 29"
8	Arie den Hartog (NED)	Ford France–Gitane	s.t.
9	Julien Stevens (BEL)	Solo–Superia	+ 3' 32"
10	Cees Haast (NED)	Televizier	+ 3' 49"

== Stage 7 ==
28 June 1965 - La Baule to La Rochelle, 219 km (136 mi)

Stage 7 result

Rank	Rider	Team	Time
1	Edward Sels (BEL)	Solo–Superia	5h 04' 47"
2	Gustave De Smet (BEL)	Wiel's–Groene Leeuw	s.t.
3	Rolf Wolfshohl (FRG)	Mercier–BP–Hutchinson	s.t.
4	Gilbert Desmet (BEL)	Wiel's–Groene Leeuw	s.t.
5	Cees van Espen (NED)	Televizier	s.t.
6	Luis Otaño (ESP)	Ferrys	s.t.
7	Bernard Van de Kerckhove (BEL)	Solo–Superia	s.t.
8	Jean-Claude Lefebvre (FRA)	Pelforth–Sauvage–Lejeune	s.t.
9	Sebastián Elorza (ESP)	Kas–Kaskol	s.t.
10	Gerben Karstens (NED)	Televizier	+ 2' 43"

General classification after stage 7

Rank	Rider	Team	Time
1	Bernard Van de Kerckhove (BEL)	Solo–Superia	37h 48' 15"
2	Cees van Espen (NED)	Televizier	+ 1' 01"
3	Gilbert Desmet (BEL)	Wiel's–Groene Leeuw	+ 1' 56"
4	Felice Gimondi (ITA)	Salvarani	+ 2' 10"
5	Rolf Wolfshohl (FRG)	Mercier–BP–Hutchinson	+ 3' 04"
6	Luis Otaño (ESP)	Ferrys	+ 4' 58"
7	Vittorio Adorni (ITA)	Salvarani	+ 4' 59"
8	Ferdinand Bracke (BEL)	Peugeot–BP–Michelin	+ 5' 07"
9	Raymond Poulidor (FRA)	Mercier–BP–Hutchinson	+ 5' 16"
10	Gustave De Smet (BEL)	Wiel's–Groene Leeuw	+ 5' 25"

== Stage 8 ==
29 June 1965 - La Rochelle to Bordeaux, 197.5 km (122.7 mi)

The finishing times were recorded at the entry to the Bordeaux velodrome.

Stage 8 result

Rank	Rider	Team	Time
1	Johan De Roo (NED)	Televizier	4h 56' 14"
2	Roger Pingeon (FRA)	Peugeot–BP–Michelin	s.t.
3	Julien Haelterman (BEL)	Flandria–Romeo	+ 54"
4	Jan Janssen (NED)	Pelforth–Sauvage–Lejeune	+ 59"
5	Jo de Haan (NED)	Televizier	s.t.
6	Henk Nijdam (NED)	Televizier	+ 54"
7	Willy Bocklant (BEL)	Flandria–Romeo	+ 59"
8	Benoni Beheyt (BEL)	Wiel's–Groene Leeuw	s.t.
9	Gerben Karstens (NED)	Televizier	s.t.
10	Tom Simpson (GBR)	Peugeot–BP–Michelin	+ 54"

General classification after stage 8

Rank	Rider	Team	Time
1	Bernard Van de Kerckhove (BEL)	Solo–Superia	42h 45' 28"
2	Cees van Espen (NED)	Televizier	+ 1' 01"
3	Gilbert Desmet (BEL)	Wiel's–Groene Leeuw	+ 1' 56"
4	Felice Gimondi (ITA)	Salvarani	+ 2' 05"
5	Rolf Wolfshohl (FRG)	Mercier–BP–Hutchinson	+ 3' 04"
6	Roger Pingeon (FRA)	Peugeot–BP–Michelin	+ 4' 51"
7	Luis Otaño (ESP)	Ferrys	+ 4' 58"
8	Vittorio Adorni (ITA)	Salvarani	+ 4' 59"
9	Ferdinand Bracke (BEL)	Peugeot–BP–Michelin	+ 5' 07"
10	Raymond Poulidor (FRA)	Mercier–BP–Hutchinson	+ 5' 16"

== Stage 9 ==
30 June 1965 - Dax to Bagnères-de-Bigorre, 226.5 km (140.7 mi)

Stage 9 result

Rank	Rider	Team	Time
1	Julio Jiménez (ESP)	Kas–Kaskol	6h 49' 19"
2	André Foucher (FRA)	Pelforth–Sauvage–Lejeune	+ 2' 48"
3	Gianni Motta (ITA)	Molteni	+ 3' 00"
4	André Zimmermann (FRA)	Peugeot–BP–Michelin	s.t.
5	Jean-Claude Lebaube (FRA)	Ford France–Gitane	s.t.
6	Felice Gimondi (ITA)	Salvarani	+ 4' 05"
7	Guido De Rosso (ITA)	Molteni	s.t.
8	Esteban Martín (ESP)	Ferrys	+ 4' 06"
9	Raymond Poulidor (FRA)	Mercier–BP–Hutchinson	s.t.
10	Tom Simpson (GBR)	Peugeot–BP–Michelin	+ 4' 40"

General classification after stage 9

Rank	Rider	Team	Time
1	Felice Gimondi (ITA)	Salvarani	49h 40' 57"
2	Raymond Poulidor (FRA)	Mercier–BP–Hutchinson	+ 3' 12"
3	André Foucher (FRA)	Pelforth–Sauvage–Lejeune	+ 4' 23"
4	Jean-Claude Lebaube (FRA)	Ford France–Gitane	s.t.
5	Gianni Motta (ITA)	Molteni	+ 4' 32"
6	Cees Haast (NED)	Televizier	+ 6' 28"
7	Tom Simpson (GBR)	Peugeot–BP–Michelin	+ 6' 39"
8	Guido De Rosso (ITA)	Molteni	+ 6' 40"
9	Karl-Heinz Kunde (FRG)	Wiel's–Groene Leeuw	+ 6' 55"
10	André Zimmermann (FRA)	Peugeot–BP–Michelin	+ 7' 21"

== Stage 10 ==
1 July 1965 - Bagnères-de-Bigorre to Ax-les-Thermes, 222.5 km (138.3 mi)

Stage 10 result

Rank	Rider	Team	Time
1	Guido Reybrouck (BEL)	Flandria–Romeo	6h 44' 18"
2	Rik Van Looy (BEL)	Solo–Superia	s.t.
3	Auguste Verhaegen (BEL)	Wiel's–Groene Leeuw	+ 3"
4	Arnaldo Pambianco (ITA)	Salvarani	+ 4"
5	Eduardo Castelló (ESP)	Ferrys	+ 1' 00"
6	Cees Haast (NED)	Televizier	+ 1' 11"
7	Fernando Manzaneque (ESP)	Ferrys	+ 1' 12"
8	Juan José Sagarduy (ESP)	Kas–Kaskol	+ 2' 30"
9	Gianni Motta (ITA)	Molteni	s.t.
10	Felice Gimondi (ITA)	Salvarani	s.t.

General classification after stage 10

Rank	Rider	Team	Time
1	Felice Gimondi (ITA)	Salvarani	56h 27' 45"
2	Raymond Poulidor (FRA)	Mercier–BP–Hutchinson	+ 3' 12"
3	André Foucher (FRA)	Pelforth–Sauvage–Lejeune	+ 4' 23"
4	Jean-Claude Lebaube (FRA)	Ford France–Gitane	s.t.
5	Gianni Motta (ITA)	Molteni	+ 4' 32"
6	Cees Haast (NED)	Televizier	+ 5' 09"
7	Rik Van Looy (BEL)	Solo–Superia	+ 5' 41"
8	Tom Simpson (GBR)	Peugeot–BP–Michelin	+ 6' 39"
9	Guido De Rosso (ITA)	Molteni	+ 6' 40"
10	Karl-Heinz Kunde (FRG)	Wiel's–Groene Leeuw	+ 6' 55"
