= 1965 Tour de France, Stage 11 to Stage 22 =

Cycling race stages

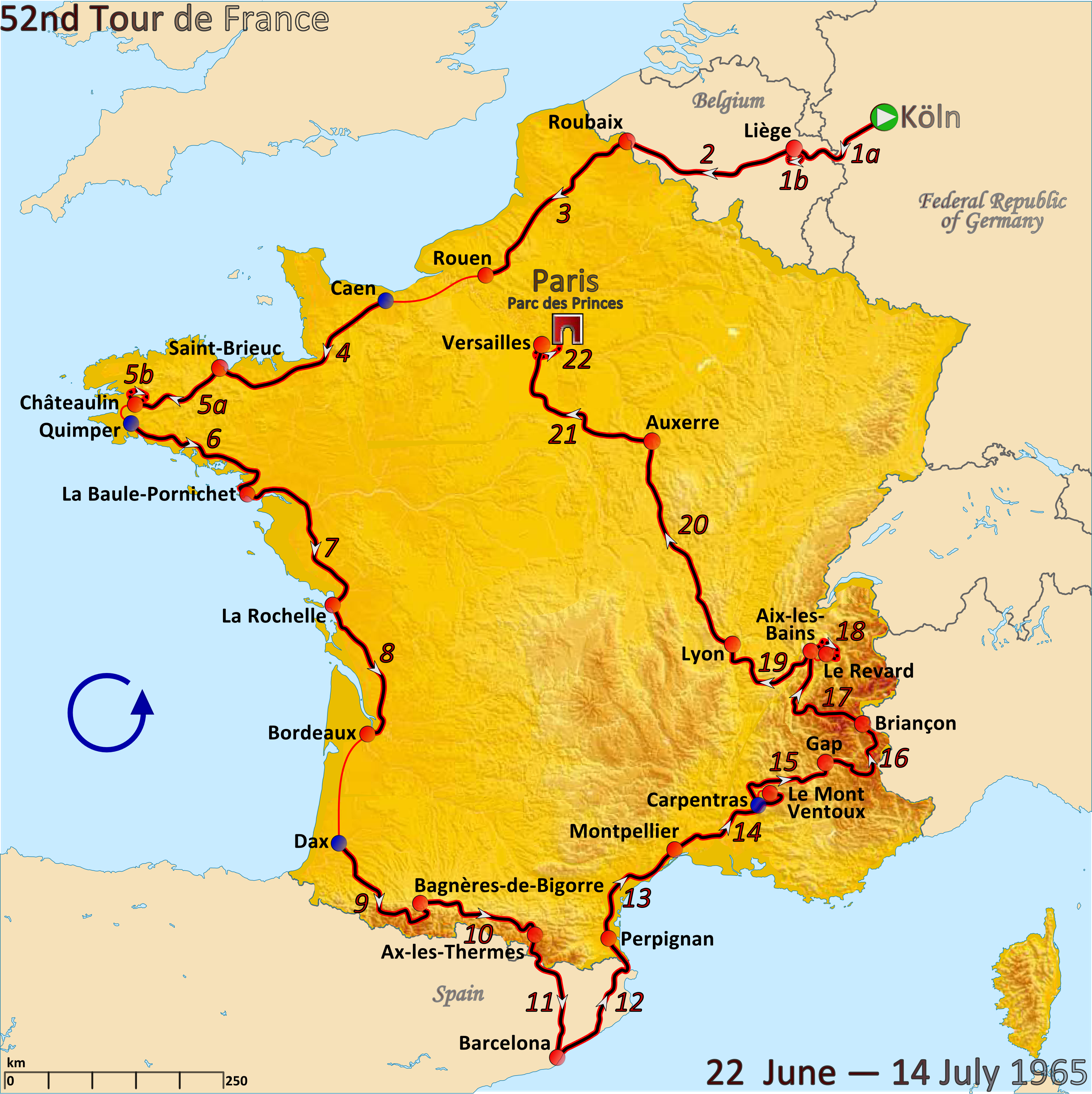
Route of the 1965 Tour de France

The 1965 Tour de France was the 52nd edition of Tour de France, one of cycling's Grand Tours. The Tour began in Cologne with a flat stage on 22 June and Stage 11 occurred on 2 July with a mountainous stage from Ax-les-Thermes. The race finished in Paris on 14 July.

== Stage 11 ==
2 July 1965 - Ax-les-Thermes to Barcelona, 240.5 km (149.4 mi)

Stage 11 result

| Rank | Rider | Team | Time |
|---|---|---|---|
| 1 | José Pérez Francés (ESP) | Ferrys | 6h 55' 59" |
| 2 | Georges Vandenberghe (BEL) | Flandria–Romeo | + 4' 23" |
| 3 | Victor Van Schil (BEL) | Mercier–BP–Hutchinson | + 4' 35" |
| 4 | Joaquín Galera (ESP) | Kas–Kaskol | + 4' 37" |
| 5 | Francisco Gabica (ESP) | Kas–Kaskol | + 4' 45" |
| 6 | Gianni Motta (ITA) | Molteni | s.t. |
| 7 | Rik Van Looy (BEL) | Solo–Superia | s.t. |
| 8 | Jan Janssen (NED) | Pelforth–Sauvage–Lejeune | s.t. |
| 9 | Michel Grain (FRA) | Ford France–Gitane | s.t. |
| 10 | Guido Reybrouck (BEL) | Flandria–Romeo | s.t. |

General classification after stage 11

| Rank | Rider | Team | Time |
|---|---|---|---|
| 1 | Felice Gimondi (ITA) | Salvarani | 63h 28' 32" |
| 2 | Raymond Poulidor (FRA) | Mercier–BP–Hutchinson | + 3' 12" |
| 3 | André Foucher (FRA) | Pelforth–Sauvage–Lejeune | + 4' 23" |
| 4 | Gianni Motta (ITA) | Molteni | + 4' 32" |
| 5 | Jean-Claude Lebaube (FRA) | Ford France–Gitane | + 4' 55" |
| 6 | José Pérez Francés (ESP) | Ferrys | + 5' 14" |
| 7 | Cees Haast (NED) | Televizier | + 5' 41" |
| 8 | Rik Van Looy (BEL) | Solo–Superia | s.t. |
| 9 | Tom Simpson (GBR) | Peugeot–BP–Michelin | + 6' 39" |
| 10 | Guido De Rosso (ITA) | Molteni | + 6' 40" |

== Rest Day ==
3 July 1965 - Barcelona

== Stage 12 ==
4 July 1965 - Barcelona to Perpignan, 219 km (136.1 mi)

Stage 12 result

| Rank | Rider | Team | Time |
|---|---|---|---|
| 1 | Jan Janssen (NED) | Pelforth–Sauvage–Lejeune | 6h 07' 52" |
| 2 | Frans Brands (BEL) | Flandria–Romeo | s.t. |
| 3 | Roger Pingeon (FRA) | Peugeot–BP–Michelin | s.t. |
| 4 | Gilbert Desmet (BEL) | Wiel's–Groene Leeuw | s.t. |
| 5 | Angelino Soler (ESP) | Peugeot–BP–Michelin | s.t. |
| 6 | Carlos Echeverría (ESP) | Kas–Kaskol | s.t. |
| 7 | Valentín Uriona (ESP) | Kas–Kaskol | s.t. |
| 8 | Désiré Letort (FRA) | Peugeot–BP–Michelin | s.t. |
| 9 | Georges Vandenberghe (BEL) | Flandria–Romeo | s.t. |
| 10 | Guido Reybrouck (BEL) | Flandria–Romeo | s.t. |

General classification after stage 12

| Rank | Rider | Team | Time |
|---|---|---|---|
| 1 | Felice Gimondi (ITA) | Salvarani | 69h 36' 56" |
| 2 | Raymond Poulidor (FRA) | Mercier–BP–Hutchinson | + 3' 12" |
| 3 | André Foucher (FRA) | Pelforth–Sauvage–Lejeune | + 4' 23" |
| 4 | Gianni Motta (ITA) | Molteni | + 4' 32" |
| 5 | Jean-Claude Lebaube (FRA) | Ford France–Gitane | + 4' 55" |
| 6 | José Pérez Francés (ESP) | Ferrys | + 5' 14" |
| 7 | Cees Haast (NED) | Televizier | + 5' 41" |
| 8 | Rik Van Looy (BEL) | Solo–Superia | s.t. |
| 9 | Tom Simpson (GBR) | Peugeot–BP–Michelin | + 6' 39" |
| 10 | Guido De Rosso (ITA) | Molteni | + 6' 40" |

== Stage 13 ==
5 July 1965 - Perpignan to Montpellier, 164 km (102 mi)

Stage 13 result

| Rank | Rider | Team | Time |
|---|---|---|---|
| 1 | Adriano Durante (ITA) | Molteni | 4h 04' 34" |
| 2 | Cees Lute (NED) | Ford France–Gitane | s.t. |
| 3 | Michael Wright (GBR) | Wiel's–Groene Leeuw | s.t. |
| 4 | Henri Dewolf (BEL) | Solo–Superia | s.t. |
| 5 | Rik Wouters (NED) | Televizier | s.t. |
| 6 | Gerben Karstens (NED) | Televizier | s.t. |
| 7 | Johny Schleck (LUX) | Pelforth–Sauvage–Lejeune | s.t. |
| 8 | Roger Swerts (BEL) | Pelforth–Sauvage–Lejeune | s.t. |
| 9 | Jean-Claude Lebaube (FRA) | Ford France–Gitane | s.t. |
| 10 | Benoni Beheyt (BEL) | Wiel's–Groene Leeuw | s.t. |

General classification after stage 13

| Rank | Rider | Team | Time |
|---|---|---|---|
| 1 | Felice Gimondi (ITA) | Salvarani | 73h 43' 15" |
| 2 | Jean-Claude Lebaube (FRA) | Ford France–Gitane | + 3' 10" |
| 3 | Raymond Poulidor (FRA) | Mercier–BP–Hutchinson | + 3' 12" |
| 4 | Cees Haast (NED) | Televizier | + 3' 56" |
| 5 | André Foucher (FRA) | Pelforth–Sauvage–Lejeune | + 4' 23" |
| 6 | Gianni Motta (ITA) | Molteni | + 4' 32" |
| 7 | José Pérez Francés (ESP) | Ferrys | + 5' 14" |
| 8 | Rik Van Looy (BEL) | Solo–Superia | + 5' 41" |
| 9 | Tom Simpson (GBR) | Peugeot–BP–Michelin | + 6' 39" |
| 10 | Guido De Rosso (ITA) | Molteni | + 6' 40" |

== Stage 14 ==
6 July 1965 - Montpellier to Mont Ventoux, 173 km (107 mi)

Stage 14 result

| Rank | Rider | Team | Time |
|---|---|---|---|
| 1 | Raymond Poulidor (FRA) | Mercier–BP–Hutchinson | 5h 47' 31" |
| 2 | Julio Jiménez (ESP) | Kas–Kaskol | + 6" |
| 3 | Henry Anglade (FRA) | Pelforth–Sauvage–Lejeune | + 1' 29" |
| 4 | Felice Gimondi (ITA) | Salvarani | + 1' 38" |
| 5 | Joaquín Galera (ESP) | Kas–Kaskol | + 1' 43" |
| 6 | Guido De Rosso (ITA) | Molteni | + 1' 50" |
| 7 | Jean-Claude Lebaube (FRA) | Ford France–Gitane | + 1' 55" |
| 8 | Jan Janssen (NED) | Pelforth–Sauvage–Lejeune | + 2' 13" |
| 9 | Tom Simpson (GBR) | Peugeot–BP–Michelin | s.t. |
| 10 | José Pérez Francés (ESP) | Ferrys | + 3' 14" |

General classification after stage 14

| Rank | Rider | Team | Time |
|---|---|---|---|
| 1 | Felice Gimondi (ITA) | Salvarani | 79h 32' 24" |
| 2 | Raymond Poulidor (FRA) | Mercier–BP–Hutchinson | + 34" |
| 3 | Jean-Claude Lebaube (FRA) | Ford France–Gitane | + 3' 27" |
| 4 | José Pérez Francés (ESP) | Ferrys | + 6' 50" |
| 5 | Guido De Rosso (ITA) | Molteni | + 6' 52" |
| 6 | André Foucher (FRA) | Pelforth–Sauvage–Lejeune | + 6' 58" |
| 7 | Cees Haast (NED) | Televizier | + 7' 06" |
| 8 | Gianni Motta (ITA) | Molteni | + 7' 10" |
| 9 | Tom Simpson (GBR) | Peugeot–BP–Michelin | + 7' 14" |
| 10 | Jan Janssen (NED) | Pelforth–Sauvage–Lejeune | + 7' 35" |

== Stage 15 ==
7 July 1965 - Carpentras to Gap, 167.5 km (104.1 mi)

Stage 15 result

| Rank | Rider | Team | Time |
|---|---|---|---|
| 1 | Giuseppe Fezzardi (ITA) | Molteni | 4h 37' 57" |
| 2 | Gilbert Desmet (BEL) | Wiel's–Groene Leeuw | s.t. |
| 3 | Auguste Verhaegen (BEL) | Wiel's–Groene Leeuw | + 35" |
| 4 | Raymond Mastrotto (FRA) | Margnat–Paloma–Inuri–Dunlop | + 38" |
| 5 | José Antonio Momeñe (ESP) | Kas–Kaskol | + 2' 10" |
| 6 | Léo van Dongen (NED) | Televizier | + 2' 14" |
| 7 | Jan Janssen (NED) | Pelforth–Sauvage–Lejeune | + 3' 16" |
| 8 | Georges Vandenberghe (BEL) | Flandria–Romeo | s.t. |
| 9 | Michael Wright (GBR) | Wiel's–Groene Leeuw | s.t. |
| 10 | Benoni Beheyt (BEL) | Wiel's–Groene Leeuw | s.t. |

General classification after stage 15

| Rank | Rider | Team | Time |
|---|---|---|---|
| 1 | Felice Gimondi (ITA) | Salvarani | 84h 13' 37" |
| 2 | Raymond Poulidor (FRA) | Mercier–BP–Hutchinson | + 34" |
| 3 | Jean-Claude Lebaube (FRA) | Ford France–Gitane | + 3' 27" |
| 4 | José Pérez Francés (ESP) | Ferrys | + 6' 50" |
| 5 | Guido De Rosso (ITA) | Molteni | + 6' 52" |
| 6 | André Foucher (FRA) | Pelforth–Sauvage–Lejeune | + 6' 58" |
| 7 | Cees Haast (NED) | Televizier | + 7' 06" |
| 8 | Gianni Motta (ITA) | Molteni | + 7' 10" |
| 9 | Tom Simpson (GBR) | Peugeot–BP–Michelin | + 7' 14" |
| 10 | Jan Janssen (NED) | Pelforth–Sauvage–Lejeune | + 7' 35" |

== Stage 16 ==
8 July 1965 - Gap to Briançon, 177 km (110 mi)

Stage 16 result

| Rank | Rider | Team | Time |
|---|---|---|---|
| 1 | Joaquín Galera (ESP) | Kas–Kaskol | 5h 46' 32" |
| 2 | Gianni Motta (ITA) | Molteni | + 45" |
| 3 | Felice Gimondi (ITA) | Salvarani | + 1' 01" |
| 4 | Julio Jiménez (ESP) | Kas–Kaskol | + 1' 04" |
| 5 | Frans Brands (BEL) | Flandria–Romeo | + 1' 06" |
| 6 | Cees Haast (NED) | Televizier | s.t. |
| 7 | Raymond Poulidor (FRA) | Mercier–BP–Hutchinson | s.t. |
| 8 | Karl-Heinz Kunde (FRG) | Wiel's–Groene Leeuw | s.t. |
| 9 | Henry Anglade (FRA) | Pelforth–Sauvage–Lejeune | s.t. |
| 10 | Guido De Rosso (ITA) | Molteni | s.t. |

General classification after stage 16

| Rank | Rider | Team | Time |
|---|---|---|---|
| 1 | Felice Gimondi (ITA) | Salvarani | 90h 01' 10" |
| 2 | Raymond Poulidor (FRA) | Mercier–BP–Hutchinson | + 39" |
| 3 | Jean-Claude Lebaube (FRA) | Ford France–Gitane | + 4' 25" |
| 4 | Gianni Motta (ITA) | Molteni | + 6' 24" |
| 5 | Guido De Rosso (ITA) | Molteni | + 6' 57" |
| 6 | Cees Haast (NED) | Televizier | + 7' 11" |
| 7 | José Pérez Francés (ESP) | Ferrys | + 7' 35" |
| 8 | Henry Anglade (FRA) | Pelforth–Sauvage–Lejeune | + 8' 33" |
| 9 | André Foucher (FRA) | Pelforth–Sauvage–Lejeune | + 8' 40" |
| 10 | Jan Janssen (NED) | Pelforth–Sauvage–Lejeune | + 11' 14" |

== Stage 17 ==
9 July 1965 - Briançon to Aix-les-Bains, 193.5 km (120.2 mi)

Stage 17 result

| Rank | Rider | Team | Time |
|---|---|---|---|
| 1 | Julio Jiménez (ESP) | Kas–Kaskol | 5h 43' 13" |
| 2 | Frans Brands (BEL) | Flandria–Romeo | + 1' 39" |
| 3 | Joaquín Galera (ESP) | Kas–Kaskol | + 1' 40" |
| 4 | Gines García (ESP) | Margnat–Paloma–Inuri–Dunlop | + 4' 03" |
| 5 | Karl-Heinz Kunde (FRG) | Wiel's–Groene Leeuw | + 4' 05" |
| 6 | Jan Janssen (NED) | Pelforth–Sauvage–Lejeune | + 4' 45" |
| 7 | Juan José Sagarduy (ESP) | Kas–Kaskol | s.t. |
| 8 | Benoni Beheyt (BEL) | Wiel's–Groene Leeuw | s.t. |
| 9 | Walter Boucquet (BEL) | Flandria–Romeo | s.t. |
| 10 | Guido Reybrouck (BEL) | Flandria–Romeo | s.t. |

General classification after stage 17

| Rank | Rider | Team | Time |
|---|---|---|---|
| 1 | Felice Gimondi (ITA) | Salvarani | 95h 49' 08" |
| 2 | Raymond Poulidor (FRA) | Mercier–BP–Hutchinson | + 39" |
| 3 | Jean-Claude Lebaube (FRA) | Ford France–Gitane | + 4' 25" |
| 4 | Gianni Motta (ITA) | Molteni | + 6' 24" |
| 5 | Guido De Rosso (ITA) | Molteni | + 6' 57" |
| 6 | José Pérez Francés (ESP) | Ferrys | + 7' 35" |
| 7 | Henry Anglade (FRA) | Pelforth–Sauvage–Lejeune | + 8' 33" |
| 8 | André Foucher (FRA) | Pelforth–Sauvage–Lejeune | + 10' 59" |
| 9 | Frans Brands (BEL) | Flandria–Romeo | + 11' 06" |
| 10 | Karl-Heinz Kunde (FRG) | Wiel's–Groene Leeuw | + 11' 08" |

== Stage 18 ==
10 July 1965 - Aix-les-Bains to Le Revard, 26.5 km (16.5 mi) (ITT)

Stage 18 result

| Rank | Rider | Team | Time |
|---|---|---|---|
| 1 | Felice Gimondi (ITA) | Salvarani | 59' 50" |
| 2 | Raymond Poulidor (FRA) | Mercier–BP–Hutchinson | + 23" |
| 3 | Roger Pingeon (FRA) | Peugeot–BP–Michelin | + 1' 40" |
| 4 | Henry Anglade (FRA) | Pelforth–Sauvage–Lejeune | + 1' 46" |
| 5 | Gianni Motta (ITA) | Molteni | + 1' 54" |
| 6 | Francisco Gabica (ESP) | Kas–Kaskol | + 2' 21" |
| 7 | José Pérez Francés (ESP) | Ferrys | + 2' 31" |
| 8 | Victor Van Schil (BEL) | Mercier–BP–Hutchinson | + 2' 56" |
| 9 | Henri Duez (FRA) | Peugeot–BP–Michelin | + 2' 58" |
| 10 | Gines García (ESP) | Margnat–Paloma–Inuri–Dunlop | + 3' 22" |

General classification after stage 18

| Rank | Rider | Team | Time |
|---|---|---|---|
| 1 | Felice Gimondi (ITA) | Salvarani | 96h 48' 38" |
| 2 | Raymond Poulidor (FRA) | Mercier–BP–Hutchinson | + 1' 12" |
| 3 | Gianni Motta (ITA) | Molteni | + 8' 38" |
| 4 | Jean-Claude Lebaube (FRA) | Ford France–Gitane | + 9' 59" |
| 5 | José Pérez Francés (ESP) | Ferrys | + 10' 26" |
| 6 | Henry Anglade (FRA) | Pelforth–Sauvage–Lejeune | + 10' 39" |
| 7 | Guido De Rosso (ITA) | Molteni | + 12' 09" |
| 8 | Karl-Heinz Kunde (FRG) | Wiel's–Groene Leeuw | + 14' 59" |
| 9 | Jan Janssen (NED) | Pelforth–Sauvage–Lejeune | + 15' 01" |
| 10 | Frans Brands (BEL) | Flandria–Romeo | + 15' 22" |

== Stage 19 ==
11 July 1965 - Aix-les-Bains to Lyon, 165 km (103 mi)

Stage 19 result

| Rank | Rider | Team | Time |
|---|---|---|---|
| 1 | Rik Van Looy (BEL) | Solo–Superia | 4h 01' 37" |
| 2 | Bas Maliepaard (NED) | Televizier | s.t. |
| 3 | René Binggeli (SUI) | Molteni | s.t. |
| 4 | Sebastián Elorza (ESP) | Kas–Kaskol | s.t. |
| 5 | Gerben Karstens (NED) | Televizier | + 4' 59" |
| 6 | Benoni Beheyt (BEL) | Wiel's–Groene Leeuw | s.t. |
| 7 | Michael Wright (GBR) | Wiel's–Groene Leeuw | s.t. |
| 8 | Jan Janssen (NED) | Pelforth–Sauvage–Lejeune | s.t. |
| 9 | Guido Reybrouck (BEL) | Flandria–Romeo | s.t. |
| 10 | Henk Nijdam (NED) | Televizier | s.t. |

General classification after stage 19

| Rank | Rider | Team | Time |
|---|---|---|---|
| 1 | Felice Gimondi (ITA) | Salvarani | 100h 55' 14" |
| 2 | Raymond Poulidor (FRA) | Mercier–BP–Hutchinson | + 1' 12" |
| 3 | Gianni Motta (ITA) | Molteni | + 8' 38" |
| 4 | Jean-Claude Lebaube (FRA) | Ford France–Gitane | + 9' 59" |
| 5 | José Pérez Francés (ESP) | Ferrys | + 10' 26" |
| 6 | Henry Anglade (FRA) | Pelforth–Sauvage–Lejeune | + 10' 39" |
| 7 | Guido De Rosso (ITA) | Molteni | + 12' 09" |
| 8 | Karl-Heinz Kunde (FRG) | Wiel's–Groene Leeuw | + 14' 59" |
| 9 | Jan Janssen (NED) | Pelforth–Sauvage–Lejeune | + 15' 01" |
| 10 | Frans Brands (BEL) | Flandria–Romeo | + 15' 22" |

== Stage 20 ==
12 July 1965 - Lyon to Auxerre, 198.5 km (123.3 mi)

Stage 20 result

| Rank | Rider | Team | Time |
|---|---|---|---|
| 1 | Michael Wright (GBR) | Wiel's–Groene Leeuw | 8h 42' 03" |
| 2 | Michel Grain (FRA) | Ford France–Gitane | + 2" |
| 3 | Henk Nijdam (NED) | Televizier | + 18" |
| 4 | Jean Milesi (FRA) | Margnat–Paloma–Inuri–Dunlop | + 24" |
| 5 | Jan Janssen (NED) | Pelforth–Sauvage–Lejeune | + 45" |
| 6 | Guido Reybrouck (BEL) | Flandria–Romeo | s.t. |
| 7 | Benoni Beheyt (BEL) | Wiel's–Groene Leeuw | s.t. |
| 8 | Gerben Karstens (NED) | Televizier | s.t. |
| 9 | Georges Vandenberghe (BEL) | Flandria–Romeo | s.t. |
| 10 | Jacques Bachelot (FRA) | Margnat–Paloma–Inuri–Dunlop | s.t. |

General classification after stage 20

| Rank | Rider | Team | Time |
|---|---|---|---|
| 1 | Felice Gimondi (ITA) | Salvarani | 109h 38' 02" |
| 2 | Raymond Poulidor (FRA) | Mercier–BP–Hutchinson | + 1' 12" |
| 3 | Gianni Motta (ITA) | Molteni | + 8' 38" |
| 4 | Jean-Claude Lebaube (FRA) | Ford France–Gitane | + 9' 59" |
| 5 | José Pérez Francés (ESP) | Ferrys | + 10' 26" |
| 6 | Henry Anglade (FRA) | Pelforth–Sauvage–Lejeune | + 10' 39" |
| 7 | Guido De Rosso (ITA) | Molteni | + 12' 09" |
| 8 | Karl-Heinz Kunde (FRG) | Wiel's–Groene Leeuw | + 14' 59" |
| 9 | Jan Janssen (NED) | Pelforth–Sauvage–Lejeune | + 15' 01" |
| 10 | Frans Brands (BEL) | Flandria–Romeo | + 15' 22" |

== Stage 21 ==
13 July 1965 - Auxerre to Versailles, 225.5 km (140.1 mi)

Stage 21 result

| Rank | Rider | Team | Time |
|---|---|---|---|
| 1 | Gerben Karstens (NED) | Televizier | 6h 12' 42" |
| 2 | Rik Van Looy (BEL) | Solo–Superia | + 45" |
| 3 | Guido Reybrouck (BEL) | Flandria–Romeo | s.t. |
| 4 | Georges Vandenberghe (BEL) | Flandria–Romeo | s.t. |
| 5 | Benoni Beheyt (BEL) | Wiel's–Groene Leeuw | s.t. |
| 6 | Jan Janssen (NED) | Pelforth–Sauvage–Lejeune | s.t. |
| 7 | Michael Wright (GBR) | Wiel's–Groene Leeuw | s.t. |
| 8 | Johan De Roo (NED) | Televizier | s.t. |
| 9 | Henk Nijdam (NED) | Televizier | s.t. |
| 10 | Gilbert Desmet (BEL) | Wiel's–Groene Leeuw | s.t. |

General classification after stage 21

| Rank | Rider | Team | Time |
|---|---|---|---|
| 1 | Felice Gimondi (ITA) | Salvarani | 115h 51' 29" |
| 2 | Raymond Poulidor (FRA) | Mercier–BP–Hutchinson | + 1' 12" |
| 3 | Gianni Motta (ITA) | Molteni | + 8' 38" |
| 4 | Jean-Claude Lebaube (FRA) | Ford France–Gitane | + 9' 59" |
| 5 | José Pérez Francés (ESP) | Ferrys | + 10' 26" |
| 6 | Henry Anglade (FRA) | Pelforth–Sauvage–Lejeune | + 10' 39" |
| 7 | Guido De Rosso (ITA) | Molteni | + 12' 09" |
| 8 | Karl-Heinz Kunde (FRG) | Wiel's–Groene Leeuw | + 14' 59" |
| 9 | Jan Janssen (NED) | Pelforth–Sauvage–Lejeune | + 15' 01" |
| 10 | Frans Brands (BEL) | Flandria–Romeo | + 15' 22" |

== Stage 22 ==
14 July 1965 - Versailles to Paris, 37.8 km (23.5 mi) (ITT)

Stage 22 result

| Rank | Rider | Team | Time |
|---|---|---|---|
| 1 | Felice Gimondi (ITA) | Salvarani | 50' 57" |
| 2 | Gianni Motta (ITA) | Molteni | + 30" |
| 3 | Raymond Poulidor (FRA) | Mercier–BP–Hutchinson | + 1' 08" |
| 4 | Walter Boucquet (BEL) | Flandria–Romeo | + 1' 19" |
| 5 | Henry Anglade (FRA) | Pelforth–Sauvage–Lejeune | + 1' 44" |
| 6 | Frans Brands (BEL) | Flandria–Romeo | + 1' 54" |
| 7 | Diego Ronchini (ITA) | Salvarani | + 1' 58" |
| 8 | Luis Otaño (ESP) | Ferrys | + 2' 03" |
| 9 | Francisco Gabica (ESP) | Kas–Kaskol | + 2' 05" |
| 10 | Roger Pingeon (FRA) | Peugeot–BP–Michelin | + 2' 16" |

General classification after stage 22

| Rank | Rider | Team | Time |
|---|---|---|---|
| 1 | Felice Gimondi (ITA) | Salvarani | 116h 42' 06" |
| 2 | Raymond Poulidor (FRA) | Mercier–BP–Hutchinson | + 2' 40" |
| 3 | Gianni Motta (ITA) | Molteni | + 9' 18" |
| 4 | Henry Anglade (FRA) | Pelforth–Sauvage–Lejeune | + 12' 43" |
| 5 | Jean-Claude Lebaube (FRA) | Ford France–Gitane | + 12' 56" |
| 6 | José Pérez Francés (ESP) | Ferrys | + 13' 15" |
| 7 | Guido De Rosso (ITA) | Molteni | + 14' 48" |
| 8 | Frans Brands (BEL) | Flandria–Romeo | + 17' 36" |
| 9 | Jan Janssen (NED) | Pelforth–Sauvage–Lejeune | + 17' 52" |
| 10 | Francisco Gabica (ESP) | Kas–Kaskol | + 19' 11" |
