= 1965 Tour de France =

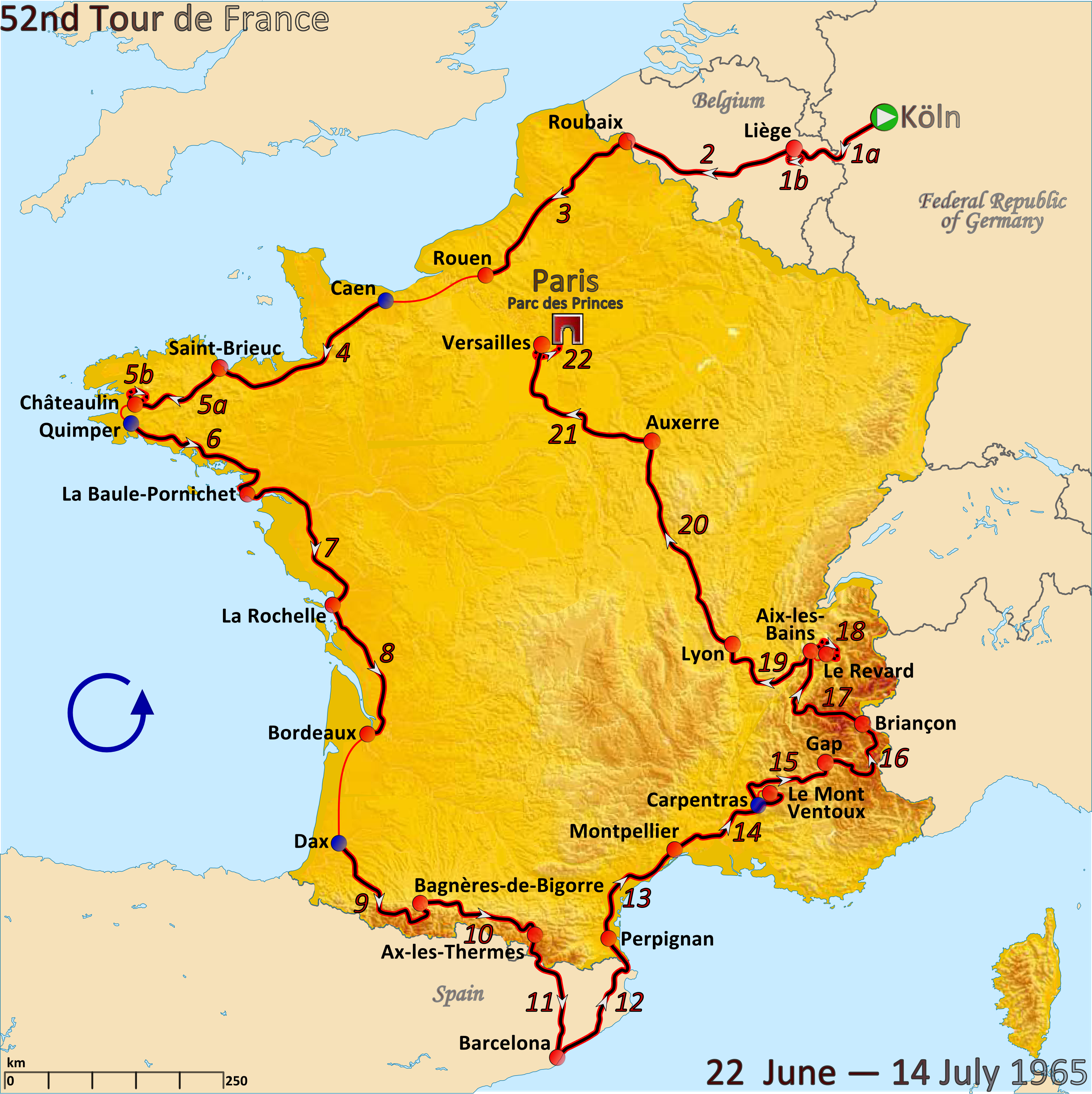
- Route of the 1965 Tour de France

Race details
- Dates: 22 June – 14 July 1965
- Stages: 22, including two split stages
- Distance: 4,188 km (2,602 mi)
- Winning time: 116h 42' 06"

Results
Jersey awarded to the overall winner	Winner	Felice Gimondi (ITA)	(Salvarani)
	Second	Raymond Poulidor (FRA)	(Mercier–BP–Hutchinson)
	Third	Gianni Motta (ITA)	(Molteni–Ignis)
Jersey awarded to the points classification winner	Points	Jan Janssen (NED)	(Pelforth–Sauvage–Lejeune)
	Mountains	Julio Jiménez (ESP)	(Kas–Kaskol)
	Combativity	Felice Gimondi (ITA)	(Salvarani)
	Team	Kas–Kaskol	

The 1965 Tour de France was the 52nd edition of the Tour de France, one of cycling's Grand Tours. It took place between 22 June and 14 July, with 22 stages covering a distance of 4,188 km (2,602 mi). In his first year as a professional, Felice Gimondi, a substitute replacement on the Salvarani team, captured the overall title ahead of Raymond Poulidor, the previous year's second-place finisher.

Gimondi became one of only seven riders, the others being Alberto Contador, Vincenzo Nibali, Chris Froome and five-time Tour winners Jacques Anquetil, Eddy Merckx and Bernard Hinault to have won all three of the major Tours. Besides Gimondi's first tour and win, it was a first for other reasons: the 1965 Tour started in Cologne, Germany (the first time the Tour started in Germany, and only the third time it started outside France), and it was the first time the start ramp was used in time trials.

Jan Janssen, who won the points classification the previous year successfully defended his title; he won another points title in 1967 and the overall title at the 1968 Tour de France.

Julio Jiménez won two stages and his first of three consecutive mountains classification. Jiminez also won the mountains classification at the 1965 Vuelta a España – becoming one of (now) four riders to complete the Tour/Vuelta double by winning both races' mountains competitions in the same year.

== Teams ==
The 1965 Tour started with 130 cyclists, divided into 13 teams of 10 cyclists. Each team had to include at least six cyclists with the same nationality. The Molteni–Ignis team was a combined team, with 5 cyclists from Molteni and 5 from Ignis.

The teams entering the race were:

- Ford France–Gitane
- Margnat–Paloma–Inuri–Dunlop
- Mercier–BP–Hutchinson
- Pelforth–Sauvage–Lejeune
- Peugeot–BP–Michelin
- Flandria–Romeo
- Solo–Superia
- Wiel's–Groene Leeuw
- Televizier
- Ferrys
- Kas–Kaskol
- Molteni–Ignis
- Salvarani

== Pre-race favourites ==
Jacques Anquetil, who won the previous four Tours de France (1961–1964), did not participate in this tour. Cyclists in that time earned most of their income in criteriums, and Anquetil believed that even if he would win a sixth time, he would not get more money in those races.

This made Raymond Poulidor, who finished second in the previous Tour, the main favourite.

Other favourites were Italians Vittorio Adorni and Gianni Motta. Adorni had won the Giro d'Italia earlier that year, helped by his team-mate Felice Gimondi who finished third in his first year as a professional. Originally, Gimondi was not planning to start the 1965 Tour, but was asked to do so after several team-mates were ill.

== Route and stages ==
The 1965 Tour de France started on 22 June, and had one rest day in Barcelona. The highest point of elevation in the race was 2,360 m (7,740 ft) at the summit of the Col d'Izoard mountain pass on stage 16.

Stage characteristics and winners
Stage	Date	Course	Distance	Type	Winner
1a	22 June	Cologne (West Germany) to Liège (Belgium)	149 km (93 mi)	Plain stage	Rik Van Looy (BEL)
1b	22 June	Liège (Belgium)	22.5 km (14.0 mi)	Team time trial	Ford France–Gitane
2	23 June	Liège (Belgium) to Roubaix	200.5 km (124.6 mi)	Plain stage	Bernard Van De Kerkhove (BEL)
3	24 June	Roubaix to Rouen	240 km (150 mi)	Plain stage	Felice Gimondi (ITA)
4	25 June	Caen to Saint-Brieuc	227 km (141 mi)	Plain stage	Edgard Sorgeloos (BEL)
5a	26 June	Saint-Brieuc to Châteaulin	147 km (91 mi)	Plain stage	Cees van Espen (NED)
5b	26 June	Châteaulin	26.7 km (16.6 mi)	Individual time trial	Raymond Poulidor (FRA)
6	27 June	Quimper to La Baule	210.5 km (130.8 mi)	Plain stage	Guido Reybrouck (BEL)
7	28 June	La Baule to La Rochelle	219 km (136 mi)	Plain stage	Edward Sels (BEL)
8	29 June	La Rochelle to Bordeaux	197.5 km (122.7 mi)	Plain stage	Johan de Roo (NED)
9	30 June	Dax to Bagnères-de-Bigorre	226.5 km (140.7 mi)	Stage with mountain(s)	Julio Jiménez (ESP)
10	1 July	Bagnères-de-Bigorre to Ax-les-Thermes	222.5 km (138.3 mi)	Stage with mountain(s)	Guido Reybrouck (BEL)
11	2 July	Ax-les-Thermes to Barcelona (Spain)	240.5 km (149.4 mi)	Stage with mountain(s)	José Pérez Francés (ESP)
	3 July	Barcelona		Rest day	
12	4 July	Barcelona (Spain) to Perpignan	219 km (136 mi)	Plain stage	Jan Janssen (NED)
13	5 July	Perpignan to Montpellier	164 km (102 mi)	Plain stage	Adriano Durante (ITA)
14	6 July	Montpellier to Mont Ventoux	173 km (107 mi)	Stage with mountain(s)	Raymond Poulidor (FRA)
15	7 July	Carpentras to Gap	167.5 km (104.1 mi)	Stage with mountain(s)	Giuseppe Fezzardi (ITA)
16	8 July	Gap to Briançon	177 km (110 mi)	Stage with mountain(s)	Joaquim Galera (ESP)
17	9 July	Briançon to Aix-les-Bains	193.5 km (120.2 mi)	Stage with mountain(s)	Julio Jiménez (ESP)
18	10 July	Aix-les-Bains to Le Revard	26.9 km (16.7 mi)	Mountain time trial	Felice Gimondi (ITA)
19	11 July	Aix-les-Bains to Lyon	165 km (103 mi)	Stage with mountain(s)	Rik Van Looy (BEL)
20	12 July	Lyon to Auxerre	198.5 km (123.3 mi)	Plain stage	Michael Wright (GBR)
21	13 July	Auxerre to Versailles	225.5 km (140.1 mi)	Plain stage	Gerben Karstens (NED)
22	14 July	Versailles to Paris	37.8 km (23.5 mi)	Individual time trial	Felice Gimondi (ITA)
	Total		4,188 km (2,602 mi)		

== Race overview ==
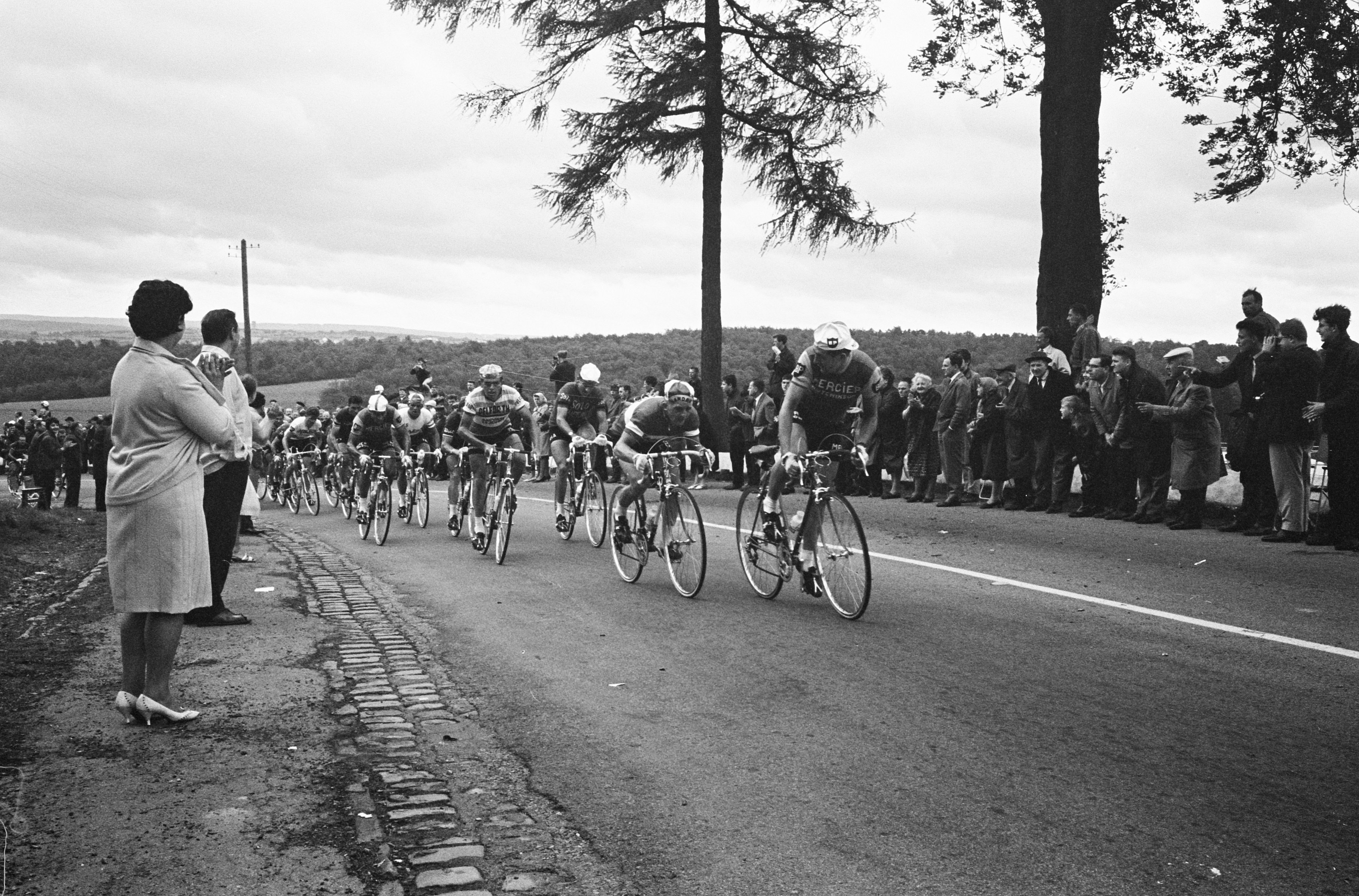
Riders climbing the Côte des Forges during stage one between Rennes and Lisieux

The race started in Germany, and the first stage, ending in Belgium, was won by Belgian Rik Van Looy. On the second stage, run over cobbles, three riders escaped: Bernard Vandekerkhove, Felice Gimondi and Victor Van Schil. Vandekerkhove won the stage, and became the new leader.

On the third stage, there was again a group away, including Gimondi and André Darrigade. Darrigade was one of the best sprinters of that time, so Gimondi knew he would not win if it would end in a sprint. Gimondi therefore escaped with one kilometre to go. Gimondi was able to stay away, and won the stage; it was the first victory in his professional career. Gimondi also took the lead in the general classification, represented by the yellow jersey; this made Gimondi a protected rider in his team because his sponsor wanted to keep the publicity associated with the yellow jersey as long as possible.

The second part of the fifth stage was run as an individual time trial. It was won by Raymond Poulidor, but Gimondi was second, and kept his lead. He had a margin in the general classification of over two minutes on Vandekerkhove, while his team leader Adorni was in third place.

In the seventh stage, Adorni fell. His team-mates, including Gimondi, waited for him and lost some time; because of this, Vandekerkhove took back the lead.

The ninth stage was the first Pyrenean stage, and during that stage eleven riders abandoned because of sickness. This included the leader of the general classification Vandekerkhove, and also Adorni. Rumours about doping that went wrong circulated, but nothing was ever proven. Gimondi became the leader of the general classification again, and because his team leader Adorni had left the race, he also became the undisputed leader of this team.

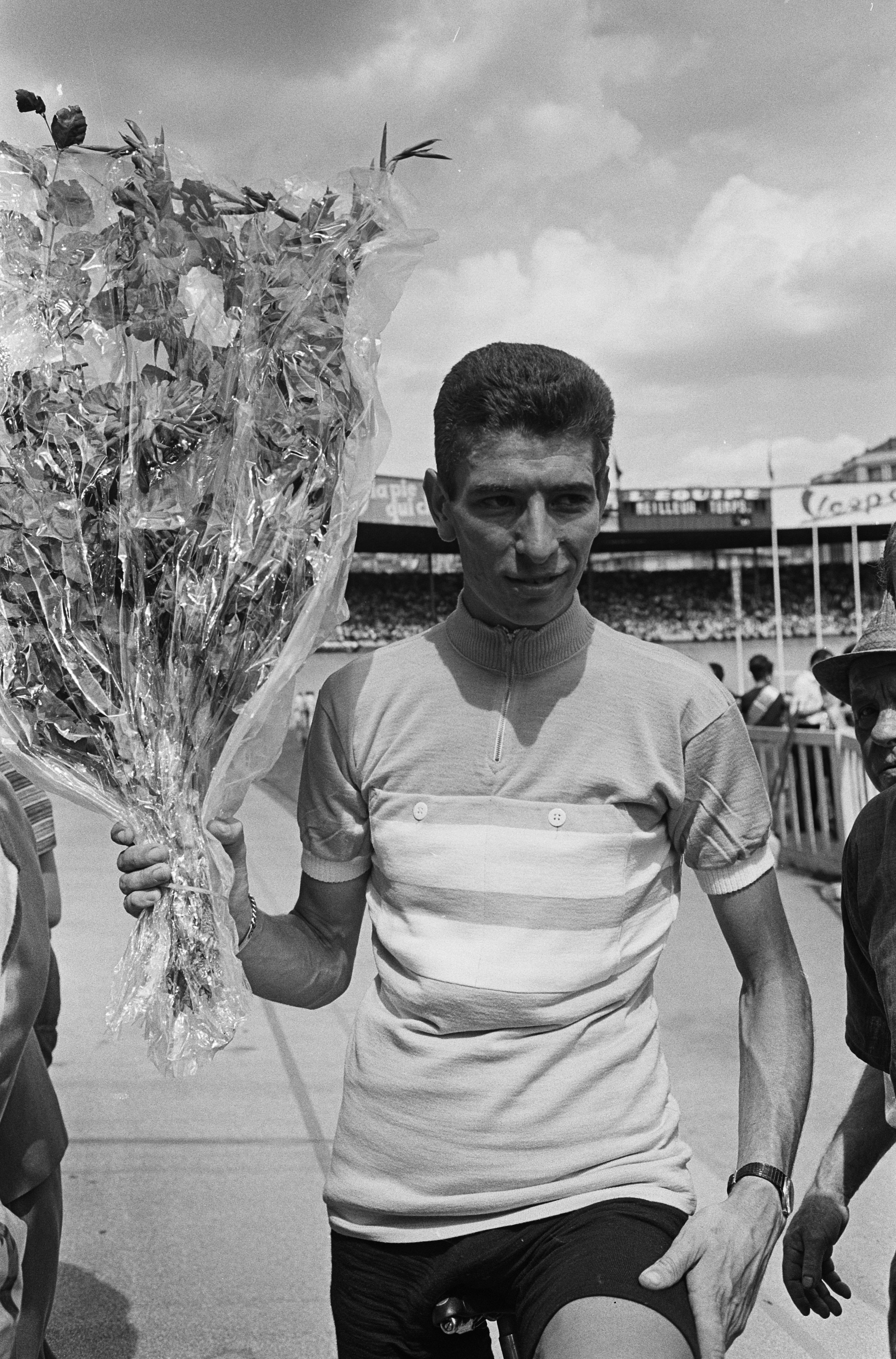
Felice Gimondi, winner of the general classification, pictured after he won the 1964 Tour de l'Avenir – the then semi-professional equivalent of the Tour de France

There were two more days in the Pyrenees, but these gave no big changes in the general classification. After stage eleven, Gimondi was still leading, with Poulidor in second place, more than three minutes behind. Poulidor expected that the inexperienced Gimondi would fail somewhere, and expected fourth-placed Motta to be his biggest rival. Poulidor announced he would attack on Mont Ventoux in stage fourteen.

During that stage, Poulidor showed his strength, and won. He had a big margin over Motta, but Gimondi had stayed surprisingly close, and kept the lead in the general classification with 34 seconds.

In the following Alp stages, Poulidor did not attack; he planned to take the lead in the mountain time trial of stage eighteen. But this was won by Gimondi, who thus increased his lead.

The only chance left for Poulidor to win back time was in the individual time trial that ended the race. Poulidor was a good time trialist, but Gimondi was fastest that day, and won the stage, and thereby the Tour de France.

== Classification leadership and minor prizes ==
There were several classifications in the 1965 Tour de France, two of them awarding jerseys to their leaders. The most important was the general classification, calculated by adding each cyclist's finishing times on each stage. The cyclist with the least accumulated time was the race leader, identified by the yellow jersey; the winner of this classification is considered the winner of the Tour.

Additionally, there was a points classification. In the points classification, cyclists got points for finishing among the best in a stage finish. The cyclist with the most points lead the classification, and was identified with a green jersey.

There was also a mountains classification. The organisation had categorised some climbs as either first, second, third, or fourth-category; points for this classification were won by the first cyclists that reached the top of these climbs first, with more points available for the higher-categorised climbs. The cyclist with the most points lead the classification, but was not identified with a jersey.

For the team classification, the times of the best three cyclists per team on each stage were added; the leading team was the team with the lowest total time. The riders in the team that led this classification wore yellow caps.

In addition, there was a combativity award given after each stage to the cyclist considered most combative. The split stages each had a combined winner. The decision was made by a jury composed of journalists who gave "stars". The cyclist with the most "stars" in all stages lead the "star classification". Felice Gimondi won this classification. The jury gave Cees Haast the prize more most unlucky cyclist, because he lost his sixth place in the general classification after a fall, and the prize for most sympathetic cyclist to Gianni Motta, because he was always in a good mood and did not look for apologies after losing to Gimondi. The Souvenir Henri Desgrange was given in honour of Tour founder Henri Desgrange to the first rider to pass the summit of the Col du Lautaret on stage 17. This prize was won by Francisco Gabica.

Classification leadership by stage
Stage	Winner	General classification	Points classification	Mountains classification (Note: No jersey was awarded to the leader of the mountains classification until a white jersey with red polka dots was introduced in 1975.)	Team classification	Combativity		Bad luck award
Stage	Winner	General classification	Points classification	Mountains classification	Team classification	Award	Classification	Bad luck award
1a	Rik Van Looy	Rik Van Looy	Rik Van Looy	Frans Brands	Solo–Superia	Frans Brands	Frans Brands	Peter Post
1b	Ford France–Gitane	Rik Van Looy	Rik Van Looy	Frans Brands	Solo–Superia	Frans Brands	Frans Brands	Peter Post
2	Bernard Van De Kerkhove	Bernard Van de Kerckhove	Bernard Van de Kerckhove	Frans Brands	Solo–Superia	Felice Gimondi	Felice Gimondi	Edward Sels
3	Felice Gimondi	Felice Gimondi	Bernard Van de Kerckhove	Frans Brands	Solo–Superia	Anatole Novak	Felice Gimondi	Georges Groussard
4	Edgard Sorgeloos	Felice Gimondi	Bernard Van de Kerckhove	Frans Brands	Solo–Superia	Jozef Timmerman	Felice Gimondi	Jozef Timmerman
5a	Cees van Espen	Felice Gimondi	Bernard Van de Kerckhove	Frans Brands	Televizier	Frans Brands	Felice Gimondi	Michel Nédélec
5b	Raymond Poulidor	Felice Gimondi	Bernard Van de Kerckhove	Frans Brands	Solo–Superia	Frans Brands	Felice Gimondi	Michel Nédélec
6	Guido Reybrouck	Felice Gimondi	Guido Reybrouck	Frans Brands	Solo–Superia	Jo de Roo	Frans Brands	no award
7	Edward Sels	Bernard Van de Kerckhove	Guido Reybrouck	Frans Brands	Solo–Superia	Edward Sels	Frans Brands	Désiré Letort
8	Johan de Roo	Bernard Van de Kerckhove	Jo de Roo	Frans Brands	Solo–Superia	Roger Pingeon	Jo de Roo	Guido Reybrouck
9	Julio Jiménez	Felice Gimondi	Felice Gimondi	Julio Jiménez	Peugeot–BP–Michelin	Julio Jiménez	Jo de Roo	André Foucher
10	Guido Reybrouck	Felice Gimondi	Jo de Roo	Julio Jiménez	Peugeot–BP–Michelin	Rik Van Looy	Jo de Roo	Ferdinand Bracke
11	José Pérez Francés	Felice Gimondi	Jo de Roo	Julio Jiménez	Peugeot–BP–Michelin	José Pérez Francés	Felice Gimondi	Georges Van Coningsloo
12	Jan Janssen	Felice Gimondi	Jo de Roo	Julio Jiménez	Peugeot–BP–Michelin	Angelino Soler	Felice Gimondi	Ambrogio Colombo
13	Adriano Durante	Felice Gimondi	Jo de Roo	Julio Jiménez	Peugeot–BP–Michelin	Hubert Ferrer	Frans Brands	Hubert Ferrer
14	Raymond Poulidor	Felice Gimondi	Jan Janssen	Julio Jiménez	Pelforth–Sauvage–Lejeune	Raymond Poulidor	Felice Gimondi	André Foucher
15	Giuseppe Fezzardi	Felice Gimondi	Jan Janssen	Julio Jiménez	Pelforth–Sauvage–Lejeune	José Antonio Momeñe	Felice Gimondi	Rik Van Looy
16	Joaquim Galera	Felice Gimondi	Jan Janssen	Julio Jiménez	Kas–Kaskol	Joaquim Galera	Felice Gimondi	Cees Haast
17	Julio Jiménez	Felice Gimondi	Jan Janssen	Julio Jiménez	Kas–Kaskol	Frans Brands	Felice Gimondi	Cees Haast
18	Felice Gimondi	Felice Gimondi	Jan Janssen	Julio Jiménez	Kas–Kaskol	Felice Gimondi	Felice Gimondi	no award
19	Rik Van Looy	Felice Gimondi	Jan Janssen	Julio Jiménez	Kas–Kaskol	Henry Anglade	Felice Gimondi	Johny Schleck
20	Michael Wright	Felice Gimondi	Jan Janssen	Julio Jiménez	Kas–Kaskol	André Darrigade	Felice Gimondi	Tom Simpson
21	Gerben Karstens	Felice Gimondi	Jan Janssen	Julio Jiménez	Kas–Kaskol	Gerben Karstens	Felice Gimondi	Armand Desmet
22	Felice Gimondi	Felice Gimondi	Jan Janssen	Julio Jiménez	Kas–Kaskol	no award	Felice Gimondi	Henri Duez
Final		Felice Gimondi	Jan Janssen	Julio Jiménez	Kas–Kaskol	Felice Gimondi		Cees Haast

== Final standings ==
=== General classification ===
Final general classification (1–10)
Rank	Rider	Team	Time
1	Felice Gimondi (ITA)	Salvarani	116h 42' 06"
2	Raymond Poulidor (FRA)	Mercier–BP–Hutchinson	+ 2' 40"
3	Gianni Motta (ITA)	Molteni–Ignis	+ 9' 18"
4	Henry Anglade (FRA)	Pelforth–Sauvage–Lejeune	+ 12' 43"
5	Jean-Claude Lebaube (FRA)	Ford France–Gitane	+ 12' 56"
6	José Pérez Francés (ESP)	Ferrys	+ 13' 15"
7	Guido De Rosso (ITA)	Molteni–Ignis	+ 14' 48"
8	Frans Brands (BEL)	Flandria–Romeo	+ 17' 36"
9	Jan Janssen (NED)	Pelforth–Sauvage–Lejeune	+ 17' 52"
10	Francisco Gabica (ESP)	Kas–Kaskol	+ 19' 11"

Final general classification (11–96)
Rank	Rider	Team	Time
11	Karl-Heinz Kunde (FRG)	Wiel's–Groene Leeuw	+ 19' 21"
12	Roger Pingeon (FRA)	Peugeot–BP–Michelin	+ 20' 32"
13	Valentín Uriona (ESP)	Kas–Kaskol	+ 24' 34"
14	Henri Duez (FRA)	Peugeot–BP–Michelin	+ 25' 07"
15	Renzo Fontona (ITA)	Molteni–Ignis	+ 25' 31"
16	Gilbert Desmet 1 (BEL)	Wiel's–Groene Leeuw	+ 28' 04"
17	André Zimmermann (FRA)	Peugeot–BP–Michelin	+ 29' 35"
18	André Foucher (FRA)	Pelforth–Sauvage–Lejeune	+ 29' 53"
19	Arnaldo Pambianco (ITA)	Salvarani	+ 32' 48"
20	Louis Rostollan (FRA)	Ford France–Gitane	+ 34' 51"
21	Walter Boucquet (BEL)	Flandria–Romeo	+ 34' 52"
22	Angelino Soler (ESP)	Peugeot–BP–Michelin	+ 36' 36"
23	Julio Jiménez (ESP)	Kas–Kaskol	+ 36' 45"
24	Michael Wright (GBR)	Wiel's–Groene Leeuw	+ 40' 11"
25	Fernando Manzaneque (ESP)	Ferrys	+ 40' 38"
26	Sebastián Elorza (ESP)	Kas–Kaskol	+ 42' 00"
27	Ginés García (ESP)	Margnat–Paloma–Inuri–Dunlop	+ 43' 23"
28	Hans Junkermann (FRG)	Margnat–Paloma–Inuri–Dunlop	+ 43' 34"
29	Rik Wouters (NED)	Televizier	+ 43' 45"
30	Luis Otaño (ESP)	Ferrys	+ 47' 07"
31	Rik Van Looy (BEL)	Solo–Superia	+ 47' 29"
32	Hubert Harings (NED)	Televizier	+ 47' 30"
33	Jean-Louis Bodin (FRA)	Mercier–BP–Hutchinson	+ 47' 49"
34	José Antonio Momeñe (ESP)	Kas–Kaskol	+ 46' 01"
35	Michel Van Aerde (BEL)	Solo–Superia	+ 49' 16"
36	Giuseppe Fezzardi (ITA)	Molteni–Ignis	+ 50' 05"
37	Joaquin Galera (ESP)	Kas–Kaskol	+ 50' 55"
38	Raymond Mastrotto (FRA)	Margnat–Paloma–Inuri–Dunlop	+ 52' 00"
39	Georges Vandenberghe (BEL)	Flandria–Romeo	+ 52' 54"
40	Roger Swerts (BEL)	Mercier–BP–Hutchinson	+ 53' 10"
41	Victor Van Schil (BEL)	Mercier–BP–Hutchinson	+ 53' 44"
42	Willy Monty (BEL)	Pelforth–Sauvage–Lejeune	+ 54' 12"
43	François Mahé (FRA)	Pelforth–Sauvage–Lejeune	+ 54' 29"
44	Eduardo Castelló (ESP)	Ferrys	+ 54' 49"
45	Auguste Verhaegen (BEL)	Wiel's–Groene Leeuw	+ 56' 11"
46	Juan José Sagarduy (ESP)	Kas–Kaskol	+ 57' 09"
47	Benoni Beheyt (BEL)	Wiel's–Groene Leeuw	+ 57' 52"
48	Gilbert Desmet 2 (BEL)	Wiel's–Groene Leeuw	+ 58' 08"
49	René Binggeli (SUI)	Molteni–Ignis	+ 59' 12"
50	Henk Nijdam (NED)	Televizier	+ 1h 02' 02"
51	Bas Maliepaard (NED)	Televizier	+ 1h 03' 42"
52	Johny Schleck (LUX)	Pelforth–Sauvage–Lejeune	+ 1h 04' 17"
53	Carlos Echeverría (ESP)	Kas–Kaskol	+ 1h 04' 19"
54	Guido Reybrouck (BEL)	Flandria–Romeo	+ 1h 05' 14"
55	Jo de Roo (NED)	Televizier	+ 1h 05' 55"
56	Joseph Planckaert (BEL)	Solo–Superia	+ 1h 08' 36"
57	Gerben Karstens (NED)	Televizier	+ 1h 12' 51"
58	Pietro Partesotti (ITA)	Salvarani	+ 1h 12' 53"
59	Roland Van de Rijse (BEL)	Flandria–Romeo	+ 1h 12' 58"
60	Henri Dewolf (BEL)	Solo–Superia	+ 1h 13' 45"
61	Frans Aerenhouts (BEL)	Mercier–BP–Hutchinson	+ 1h 15' 10"
62	Jacques Bachelot (FRA)	Margnat–Paloma–Inuri–Dunlop	+ 1h 16' 04"
63	Adriano Portaluppi (ITA)	Molteni–Ignis	+ 1h 17' 54"
64	Robert Cazala (FRA)	Mercier–BP–Hutchinson	+ 1h 20' 18"
65	Esteban Martín (ESP)	Ferrys	+ 1h 20' 51"
66	Anatole Novak (FRA)	Ford France–Gitane	+ 1h 22' 08"
67	Cees Lute (NED)	Ford France–Gitane	+ 1h 22' 22"
68	Italo Mazzacurati (ITA)	Salvarani	+ 1h 23' 33"
69	Joseph Timmermann (BEL)	Wiel's–Groene Leeuw	+ 1h 24' 45"
70	Gilberto Vendemmiati (ITA)	Salvarani	+ 1h 25' 45"
71	Jean Gainche (FRA)	Mercier–BP–Hutchinson	+ 1h 27' 06"
72	Noël Depauw (BEL)	Solo–Superia	+ 1h 27' 49"
73	Adriano Durante (ITA)	Molteni–Ignis	+ 1h 28' 05"
74	Remo Stefanoni (ITA)	Molteni–Ignis	+ 1h 28' 11"
75	Jean-Pierre Genet (FRA)	Mercier–BP–Hutchinson	+ 1h 31' 07"
76	Rogelio Hernández (ESP)	Ferrys	+ 1h 31' 39"
77	Jo de Haan (NED)	Televizier	+ 1h 37' 16"
78	Ambrogio Colombo (ITA)	Molteni–Ignis	+ 1h 37' 26"
79	Francis Blanc (SUI)	Salvarani	+ 1h 40' 43"
80	Guillaume Van Tongerloo (BEL)	Flandria–Romeo	+ 1h 41' 28"
81	Yvo Molenaers (BEL)	Flandria–Romeo	+ 1h 41' 42"
82	Jean-Claude Lefebvre (FRA)	Pelforth–Sauvage–Lejeune	+ 1h 43' 26"
83	Michel Grain (FRA)	Ford France–Gitane	+ 1h 43' 26"
84	Edgar Sorgeloos (BEL)	Solo–Superia	+ 1h 43' 51"
85	Antonio Bertrán (ESP)	Ferrys	+ 1h 45' 30"
86	Diego Ronchini (ITA)	Salvarani	+ 1h 46' 32"
87	Vin Denson (GBR)	Ford France–Gitane	+ 1h 46' 36"
88	François Le Her (FRA)	Margnat–Paloma–Inuri–Dunlop	+ 1h 48' 48"
89	Giacomo Fornoni (ITA)	Molteni–Ignis	+ 1h 49' 12"
90	Leo van Dongen (NED)	Televizier	+ 1h 49' 28"
91	Mario Minieri (ITA)	Salvarani	+ 1h 53' 34"
92	Hubert Ferrer (FRA)	Pelforth–Sauvage–Lejeune	+ 2h 03' 47"
93	André Darrigade (FRA)	Margnat–Paloma–Inuri–Dunlop	+ 2h 14' 18"
94	Jean Milesi (FRA)	Margnat–Paloma–Inuri–Dunlop	+ 2h 22' 38"
95	Raúl Rey (ESP)	Ferrys	+ 2h 23' 37"
96	Joseph Groussard (FRA)	Pelforth–Sauvage–Lejeune	+ 2h 37' 38"

=== Points classification ===
Final points classification (1–10)
Rank	Rider	Team	Points
1	Jan Janssen (NED)	Pelforth–Sauvage–Lejeune	144
2	Guido Reybrouck (BEL)	Flandria–Romeo	130
3	Felice Gimondi (ITA)	Salvarani	124
4	Rik Van Looy (BEL)	Solo–Superia	109
5	Michael Wright (GBR)	Wiel's–Groene Leeuw	98
6	Georges Vandenberghe (BEL)	Flandria–Romeo	94
7	Benoni Beheyt (BEL)	Wiel's–Groene Leeuw	85
8	Frans Brands (BEL)	Flandria–Romeo	84
8	Julio Jiménez (ESP)	Kas–Kaskol	84
8	Gianni Motta (ITA)	Molteni–Ignis	84

=== Mountains classification ===
Final mountains classification (1–10)
Rank	Rider	Team	Points
1	Julio Jiménez (ESP)	Kas–Kaskol	133
2	Frans Brands (BEL)	Flandria–Romeo	74
3	Joaquin Galera (ESP)	Kas–Kaskol	68
4	Felice Gimondi (ITA)	Salvarani	55
5	Raymond Poulidor (FRA)	Mercier–BP–Hutchinson	48
6	Henri Anglade (FRA)	Pelforth–Sauvage–Lejeune	47
7	Gianni Motta (ITA)	Molteni–Ignis	45
8	José Pérez Francés (ESP)	Ferrys	43
9	Rik Van Looy (BEL)	Solo–Superia	30
10	Francisco Gabica (ESP)	Kas–Kaskol	25

=== Team classification ===
Final team classification
Rank	Team	Time
1	Kas–Kaskol	349h 29' 19"
2	Pelforth–Sauvage–Lejeune	+ 16' 08"
3	Molteni–Ignis	+ 16' 35"
4	Peugeot–BP–Michelin	+ 21' 36"
5	Wiel's–Groene Leeuw	+ 36' 03"
6	Salvarani	+ 38' 17"
7	Ferrys	+ 46' 51"
8	Mercier–BP–Hutchinson	+ 50' 21"
9	Televizier	+ 54' 51"
10	Ford France–Gitane	+ 1h 03' 52"
11	Flandria–Romeo	+ 1h 10' 43"
12	Solo–Superia	+ 1h 17' 08"
13	Margnat–Paloma–Inuri–Dunlop	+ 1h 31' 09"

=== Combativity classification ===
Final combativity classification (1–3)
Rank	Rider	Team	Points
1	Felice Gimondi (ITA)	Salvarani	80
2	Henri Anglade (FRA)	Pelforth–Sauvage–Lejeune	58
3	Frans Brands (BEL)	Flandria–Romeo	56

== Bibliography ==
- Augendre, Jacques (2016). Guide historique [Historical guide] (PDF) (in French). Paris: Amaury Sport Organisation. Archived (PDF) from the original on 17 August 2016.
- McGann, Bill; McGann, Carol (2008). The Story of the Tour de France: 1965–2007. Vol. 2. Indianapolis: Dog Ear Publishing. ISBN 978-1-59858-608-4.
- Nauright, John; Parrish, Charles (2012). Sports Around the World: History, Culture, and Practice. Vol. 2. Santa Barbara, California: ABC-CLIO. ISBN 978-1-59884-300-2.
- van den Akker, Pieter (2018). Tour de France Rules and Statistics: 1903–2018. Self-published. ISBN 978-1-79398-080-9.
