= Casquette =

Peaked cotton cap worn by racing cyclists

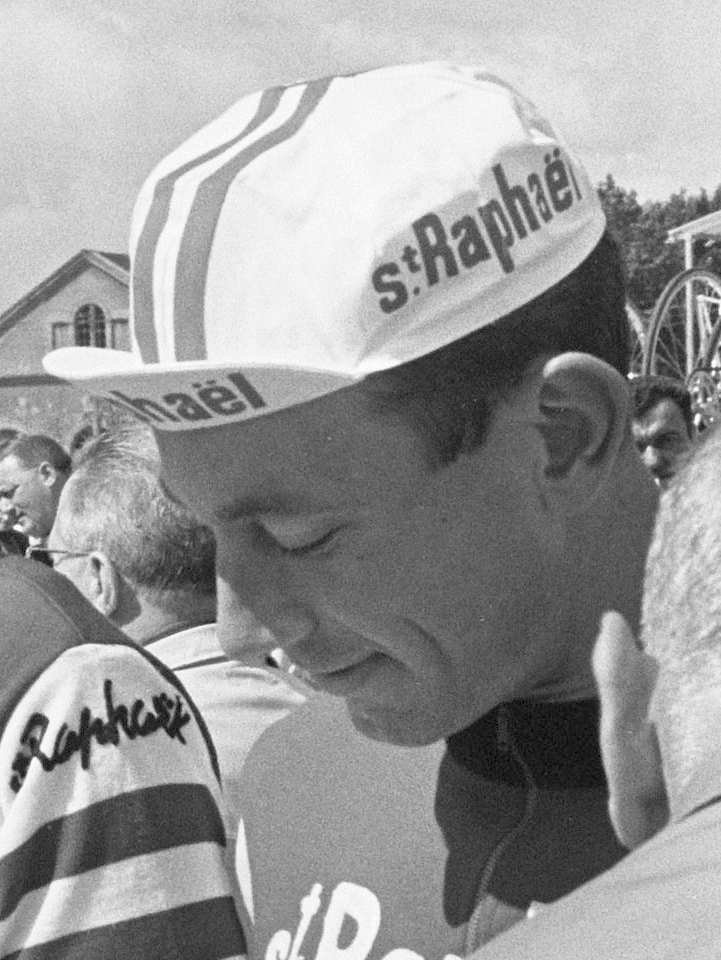
Jean-Claude Lebaube wearing a casquette in 1964

A casquette (from French 'cap') is a peaked cap, traditionally made out of cotton and worn by road cyclists.

The casquette shields the head from strong sun and the peak can also make riding in the rain more comfortable, since drops do not fall directly into the eyes. They are sometimes worn with the peak backwards, not for reasons of fashion but because the peak then protects the neck from sunburn. Some varieties also incorporate a sweatband to help prevent sweat from dripping into the eyes.

contemporary fashionable casquette made from polyester

With the introduction of compulsory cycle helmets for massed-start racing, casquettes have become less common, but most professional race outfits still have them produced in team colours for wearing on the winners' podium, for wearing under a helmet in heavy rain or for sale to the tifosi. They have also become popular as fashion items in some European, American and Australian cities, often with non-cycling-related designs.

== Motorcycle technology ==
The name was also used by Royal Enfield motorcycles in the 1950s, to describe their version of the headlamp nacelle on Triumph motorcycles.

The casquette is still used on the 2009 Royal Enfield Bullet model.

== See also ==
- Glossary of bicycling
- List of hat styles
