= Anketell (disambiguation) =

Anketell may refer to:

== People ==
- Anchetil de Greye, Anglo-Norman knight
- Geoffrey Anketell Studdert Kennedy (1883–1929), Anglican priest and poet
- Anketell Moutray Read (1884–1915), English recipient of the Victoria Cross
- Oliver Anketell (b. 1679 – fl. 1760), Irish politician

== Other ==
- Anketell, Western Australia, suburb of Perth, Western Australia
- Anketell Port in Western Australia, near Cape Lambert

== Other forms and similar names ==
- Anquetil
