= Roland Zöffel =

Swiss cyclist

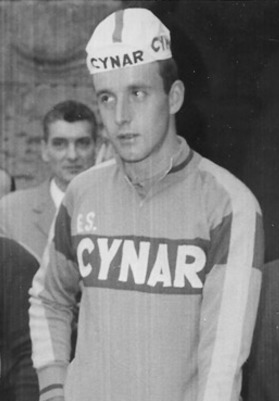
- Zöffel in 1963

Personal information
- Born: 17 August 1938 (age 88) Münster, Germany

Cycling career
- Sport: Cycling
- Current team: Retired
- Disciplines: Road; Track

Professional teams
- 1963–1965: Cynar–Frejus
- 1965: Salvarani
- 1966: Tigra
- 1967: Zimba–Mondia

Roland Zöffel (born 17 August 1938 in St. Margrethen) is a Swiss former cyclist. He competed in the team time trial at the 1960 Summer Olympics. He also rode in the 1965 Tour de France and the 1963 Giro d'Italia.

== Major results ==
=== Road ===
1963
9th Overall Tour de Luxembourg
1964
1st Stage 5a Giro di Sardegna
4th Grand Prix de Belgique
1965
2nd Züri-Metzgete

=== Track ===
1963
1st Individual pursuit, National Track Championships
1964
1st Individual pursuit, National Track Championships
1966
3rd Individual pursuit, National Track Championships
