= Juan García Such =

Spanish cyclist

Personal information
- Born: 31 December 1937
- Died: 16 October 2009 (aged 71)

Cycling career
- Sport: Cycling
- Role: Rider

Juan García Such (31 December 1937 – 16 October 2009) was a Spanish racing cyclist. He rode in the 1965 Tour de France.
