= Pietro Partesotti =

Italian cyclist

Personal information
- Born: 10 April 1941 (age 85) Reggio Emilia

Cycling career
- Sport: Cycling
- Role: Rider

Pietro Partesotti (born 10 April 1941) is an Italian racing cyclist. He rode in the 1965 Tour de France.
