= Julien Haelterman =

Belgian cyclist

Personal information
- Born: 2 May 1940 (age 86)

Cycling career
- Sport: Cycling
- Role: Rider

Julien Haelterman (born 2 May 1940) is a Belgian racing cyclist. He rode in the 1965 Tour de France.
