= Remo Stefanoni =

Italian cyclist

Personal information
- Born: 10 September 1940 (age 86)

Cycling career
- Sport: Cycling
- Role: Rider

Remo Stefanoni (born 10 September 1940) is an Italian racing cyclist. He rode in the 1965 Tour de France.
