= Francis Blanc =

Swiss cyclist

Personal information
- Born: 26 September 1938 (age 88)

Cycling career
- Sport: Cycling
- Role: Rider

Francis Blanc (born 26 September 1938) is a Swiss racing cyclist. He rode in the 1965 Tour de France.
