= François Le Her =

French cyclist

Personal information
- Born: 10 May 1938 (age 88)

Cycling career
- Sport: Cycling
- Role: Rider

François Le Her (born 10 May 1938) is a French racing cyclist. He rode in the 1965 Tour de France.
