= Anquetil =

Anquetil is a Norman surname, former first name, from Old Norse Ásketill, combination of as "god" (see ōs) and ketill "cauldron" (see kettle). Notable people with the surname include:

- Abraham Hyacinthe Anquetil-Duperron (1731–1805), French orientalist, brother of Louis-Pierre
- Emmanuel Anquetil, Mauritian politician
- Jacques Anquetil (1934–1987), French road racing cyclist
- Louis-Pierre Anquetil (1723–1808), French historian
- Grégory Anquetil (born1970), French handball player
- Stéphanie Anquetil, Mauritian politician

== Other forms and similar names ==
- Anketell (disambiguation)
