= Gilberto Vendemiati =

Italian cyclist

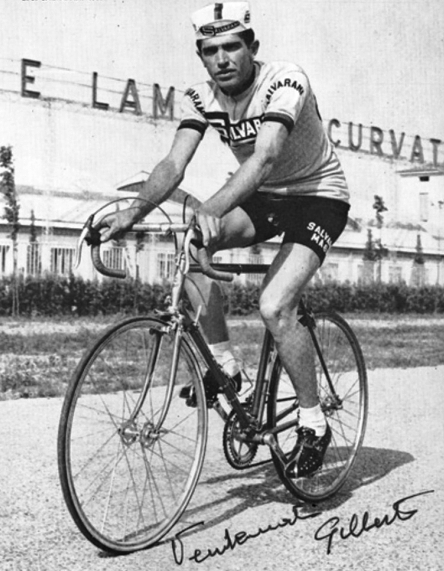

Personal information
- Born: 27 May 1940 (age 86) Ferrara, Italy

Cycling career
- Sport: Cycling
- Current team: Retired
- Discipline: Road
- Role: Rider
- Rider type: Domestique

Professional teams
- 1963–1964: Gazzola
- 1965–1966: Salvarani
- 1967: Max Meyer

Gilberto Vendemiati (born 27 May 1940) is an Italian former professional racing cyclist.

== Career ==
Vendemiati competed as a professional from 1963 to 1967 with the Gazzola, Salvarani and Max Meyer teams, riding primarily as a domestique. He rode in the 1965 Tour de France as well as in three editions of the Giro d'Italia.

As of 2019, Vendemiati still rides his bike for up to 50 to 60 kilometers.

== Major results ==
1961
1st Coppa Lanciotto Ballerini
1st Stage 8 Tour de l'Avenir
1962
1st Overall Giro della Valle d'Aosta

1st Stage 1

1965
8th Giro di Romagna

=== Grand Tour general classification results timeline ===
Grand Tour	1963	1964	1965
Vuelta a España	—	—	—
Giro d'Italia	52	DNF	45
Tour de France	—	—	70
