= Jean-Louis Bodin =

French cyclist (1943–2019)

Personal information
- Born: 23 November 1943
- Died: 3 June 2019 (aged 75)

Cycling career
- Sport: Cycling
- Role: Rider

Jean-Louis Bodin (23 November 1943 – 3 June 2019) was a French racing cyclist. He rode in the 1965 Tour de France.
