= Renneville, Eure =

Renneville
- Commune
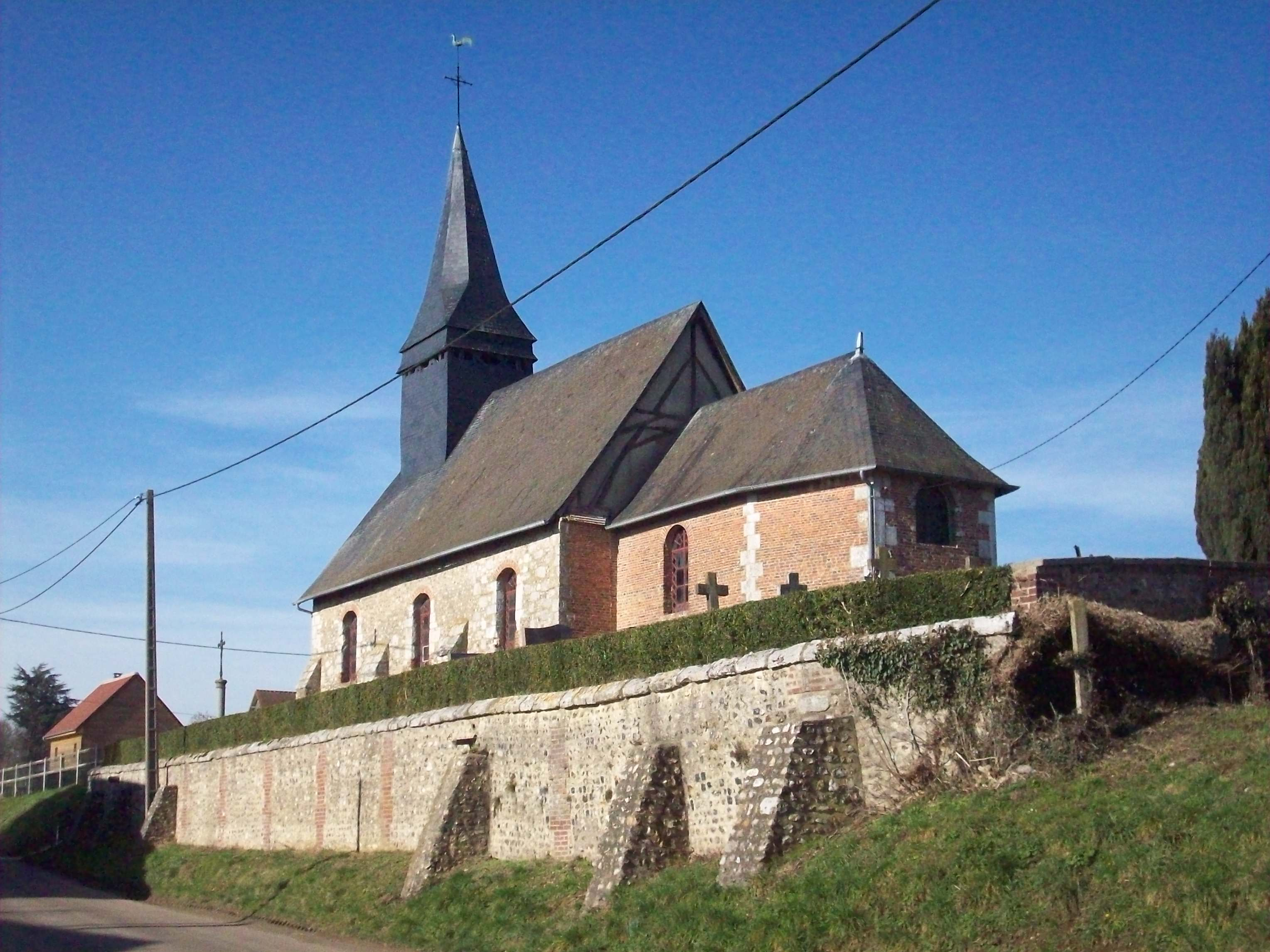
- The church in Renneville
- Location of Renneville
- Location within France Location within Normandy
- Coordinates: 49°24′12″N 1°19′17″E
- Country: France
- Region: Normandy
- Department: Eure
- Arrondissement: Les Andelys
- Canton: Romilly-sur-Andelle

Government
  - Mayor (2020–2026): Gilles Vieillard
- Area^{1}: 6.3 km^{2} (2.4 sq mi)
- Elevation: 143 m (469 ft)
- Highest elevation: 153 m (502 ft)
- Lowest elevation: 78 m (256 ft)
- Population (2023): 208
  - Density: 33/km^{2} (86/sq mi)
- Time zone: UTC+01:00 (CET)
  - Summer (DST): UTC+02:00 (CEST)
- INSEE/Postal code: 27488 /27910
- ^{1} French Land Register data, which excludes lakes, ponds, glaciers > 1 km^{2} (0.386 sq mi or 247 acres) and river estuaries.

Renneville (French pronunciation: [ʁɛnvil]) is a commune in the Eure department in northern France.

== Population ==
Historical population
Year	Pop.	±% p.a.
1968	110	—
1975	117	+0.89%
1982	150	+3.61%
1990	200	+3.66%
1999	201	+0.06%
2007	240	+2.24%
2012	199	−3.68%
2017	197	−0.20%
2023	208	+0.91%
Source: INSEE

== See also ==
- Communes of the Eure department
