= Ambrogio Colombo =

Italian cyclist (1940–2026)

Personal information
- Born: 6 May 1940 San Vittore Olona, Italy
- Died: 25 July 2026 (aged 86) Varese, Italy

Cycling career
- Sport: Cycling
- Role: Rider

Ambrogio Colombo (6 May 1940 – 25 July 2026) was an Italian racing cyclist. He rode in the 1965 Tour de France.

Colombo died in Varese on 25 July 2026, at the age of 86.
