= Jozef Timmerman =

Belgian cyclist (1941–2018)

Personal information
- Born: 30 October 1941
- Died: 10 March 2018 (aged 76)

Cycling career
- Sport: Cycling
- Role: Rider

Jozef Timmerman (30 October 1941 – 10 March 2018) was a Belgian racing cyclist. He rode in the 1964 Tour de France.
