= Bernard Van de Kerckhove =

Belgian cyclist

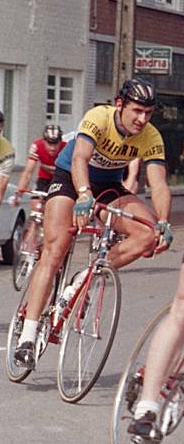

Personal information
- Born: 8 July 1941 Mouscron, Belgium
- Died: 15 September 2015 (aged 74)

Cycling career
- Sport: Cycling
- Current team: Retired
- Discipline: Road
- Role: Rider

Major wins
- Two stages Tour de France

Bernard Van de Kerckhove (8 July 1941 – 15 September 2015) was a Belgian professional road bicycle racer from 1962 to 1971. The highlights of his career were stage win in the 1964 Tour de France, which resulted in him wearing the yellow jersey for two stages. Then again in the 1965 Tour de France he won stage two and wore the jersey for one day. He would reclaim the jersey in this Tour, and wear it for two more days at the beginning of the 2nd week.

== Major results ==
1962
Roeselare
1963
Houthulst
Omloop der Zennevalei
Koksijde
1964
Assebroek
Tour de France:

Winner stage 3A
Wearing yellow jersey for two days

Roeselare
Wingene
1965
Adinkerke
Meerbeke
Omloop der Vlaamse Ardennen
Tour de France:

Winner stage 2
Wearing yellow jersey for three days

Merelbeke
1966
Adinkerke
Stadsprijs Geraardsbergen
1967
Adinkerke
1968
Westouter
Zingem
1969
Koksijde
