= Jacques Bachelot =

French cyclist

Personal information
- Born: 24 January 1938 (age 88)

Cycling career
- Sport: Cycling
- Role: Rider

Jacques Bachelot (born 24 January 1938) is a French racing cyclist. He rode in the 1965 Tour de France.
