= Cees van Espen =

Dutch cyclist

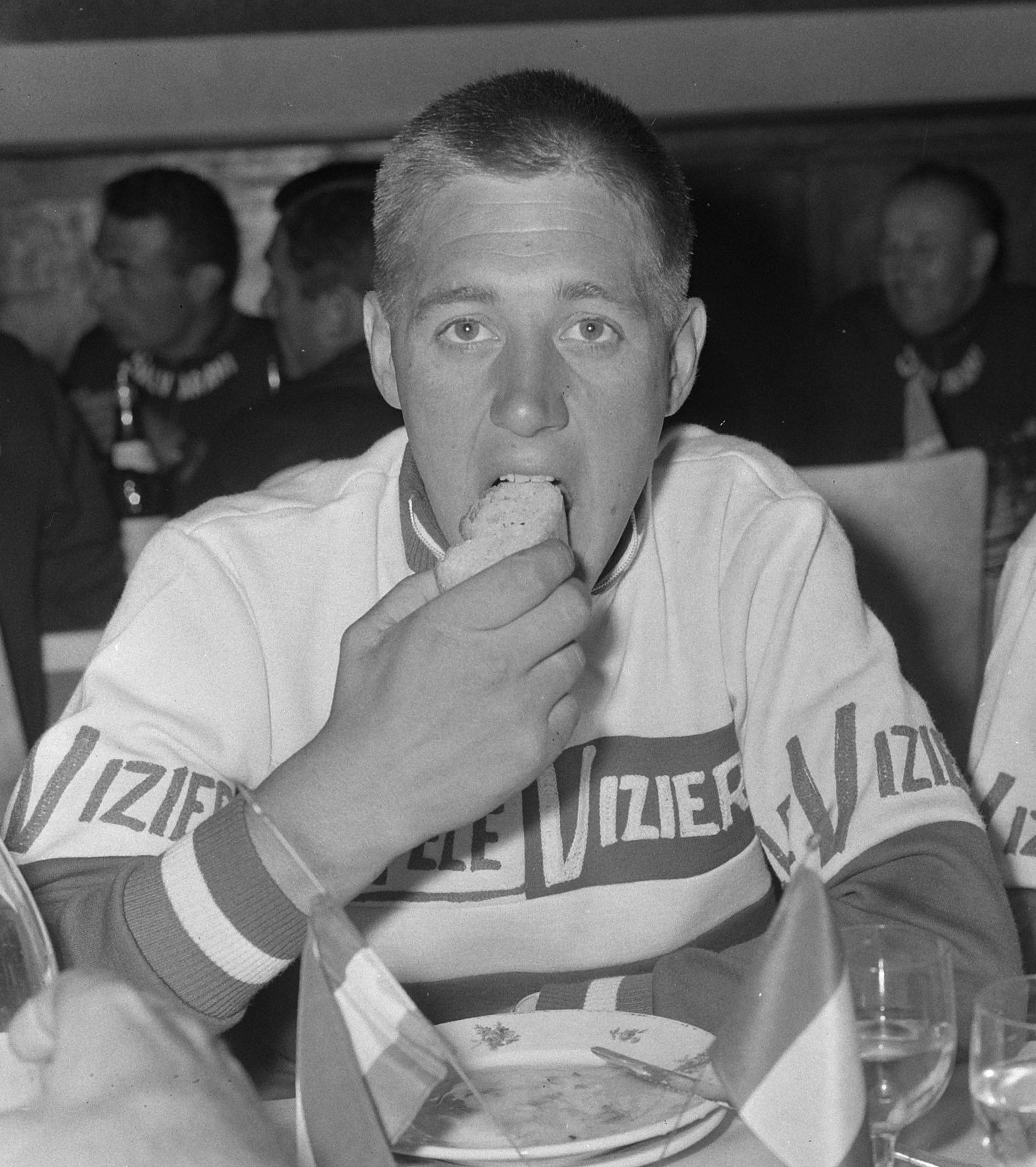
- Cees van Espen at the 1964 Tour de France

Personal information
- Full name: Cees van Espen
- Born: 28 May 1938 (age 88) Arnhem, the Netherlands

Cycling career
- Sport: Cycling
- Discipline: Road
- Role: Rider

Major wins
- 1 stage Tour de France

Cees van Espen (born 28 May 1938) is a retired Dutch road bicycle racer. He rode the Tour de France in 1964 and 1965, and won the fifth stage in 1965.

== Major results ==
1962
Ronde van Twente
1963
Tour de Canada
1964
Ossendrecht
1965
Oldenzaal
Tour de France:

Winner stage 5

Zundert
1966
Putte-Mechelen
