= Michel Nédélec =

French cyclist

Personal information
- Born: 7 March 1940 Plougastel-Daoulas, France
- Died: 3 October 2009 (aged 69)

Cycling career
- Sport: Cycling

Michel Nédélec (French pronunciation: [miʃɛl nedelɛk]; 7 March 1940 – 3 October 2009) was a French cyclist. He competed in the team pursuit at the 1960 Summer Olympics.
