= Joaquín Galera =

Spanish cyclist (1940–2025)

Personal information
- Full name: Joaquín Galera Magdaleno
- Born: 25 March 1940 Baúl, Andalucia, Spain
- Died: 14 April 2025 (aged 85) Armilla, Andalucia

Cycling career
- Sport: Cycling
- Discipline: Road
- Role: Rider
- Rider type: Climber

Major wins
- 1 stage 1965 Tour de France

Joaquín Galera Magdaleno (25 March 1940 – 14 April 2025) was a Spanish professional road bicycle racer. He died on 14 April 2025, at the age of 85. His younger brother Manuel also competed professionally as a cyclist.

== Major results ==
1965
Subida al Naranco
Tour de France:

Winner stage 16

1966
La Reineta
1967
Getxo
1968
Subida Urkiola
