= Frans Brands =

Belgian cyclist (1940–2008)

- Brands in 1966

Personal information
- Full name: Frans Brands
- Born: 31 May 1940 Berendrecht, Belgium
- Died: 9 February 2008 (aged 67) Blankenberge, Belgium

Cycling career
- Sport: Cycling
- Discipline: Road
- Role: Rider

Professional teams
- 1961–1962: Libertas
- 1963–1965: Flandria
- 1964–1965: Flandria–Faema
- 1966–1968: Smith's
- 1969: Faema
- 1970: Geens-Watney
- 1971: Individual
- 1972: Goldor

Major wins
- 1 stage 1963 Tour de France; 1 stage 1965 Giro d'Italia

Frans Brands (31 May 1940 in Berendrecht – 9 February 2008 in Blankenberge) was a Belgian professional road bicycle racer. Brands won a stage in the 1963 Tour de France and in the 1965 Giro d'Italia, and was the winner of the 1967 Tour de Luxembourg.

== Major results ==
1961
Rummen
1963
Tour de France:

Winner stage 18

1964
München - Zürich
Pléneour-Lanver
GP Stad Vilvoorde
Sint-Amandsberg
Omloop Hageland-Zuiderkempen
Zellik
Kapellen
1965
Roosendaal
Giro d'Italia:

Winner stage 8

Stabroek
Sint-Lenaerts
Bilzen
Ossendrecht
Nationale Sluitingsprijs
Tour de France:

8th place overall classification

1966
Omloop van West-Brabant
Polder-Kempen
Visé
Essen
1967
Omloop der drie Proviniciën
De Pinte
Tour de Luxembourg
Auvelais
1968
Nokere Koerse
Herenthout
Oud-Turnhout
Buggenhout
Nationale Sluitingsprijs
1969
Mortsel
Houtem
1970
Belsele - Puivelde
Sint-Kwintens-Lennik
Wilrijk
1971
Antwerpen
