= Henri Duez =

French cyclist (1937–2025)

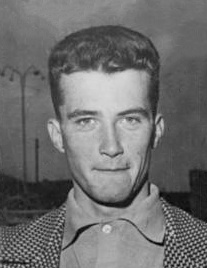
- Duez in 1960

Personal information
- Born: 18 December 1937 La Comté, France
- Died: 6 March 2025 (aged 87) Beuvry, France
- Height: 1.69 m (5 ft 7 in)
- Weight: 64 kg (141 lb)

Sport
- Sport: Cycling

Henri Duez (18 December 1937 – 6 March 2025) was a French cyclist who competed at the 1960 Summer Olympics in the 100 km team time trial and finished in seventh place. He won the Route de France in 1959 and Volta a Catalunya in 1961. In 1965, he won a one-day race in Lubersac and finished 14th in the Tour de France.

Duez died in Beuvry, France on 6 March 2025, at the age of 87.
