= Willy Monty =

Belgian cyclist (1939–2014)

Personal information
- Born: 11 October 1939 Hainaut, Belgium
- Died: 9 November 2014 (aged 75)

Cycling career
- Sport: Cycling

Professional teams
- 1963: Pelforth-Sauvage-Lejeune
- 1963: Peugeot-BP-Englebert
- 1964–1968: Pelforth-Sauvage-Lejeune
- 1969: Peugeot-BP-Michelin
- 1970: Faemino-Faema
- 1971: Watneys-Avia

Willy Monty (11 October 1939 – 9 November 2014) was a Belgian racing cyclist. He competed in the team time trial at the 1960 Summer Olympics. Monty won a stage in the Dauphiné Libéré in 1964 and two stages in the Volta a Catalunya in 1965.
