= Jean-Claude Lebaube =

French cyclist

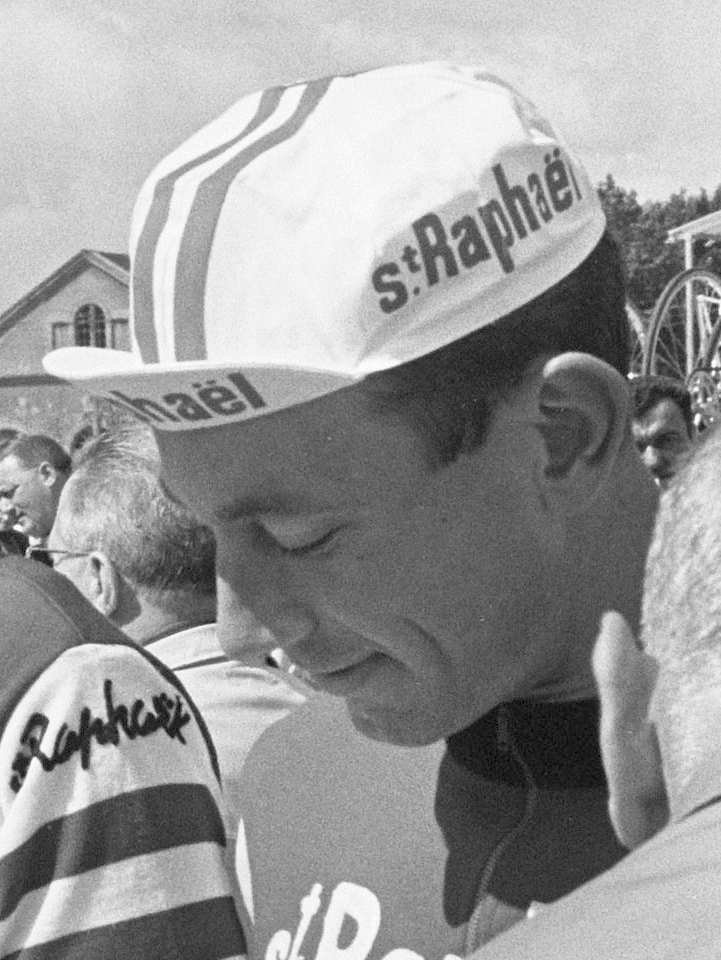

Personal information
- Full name: Jean-Claude Lebaube
- Nickname: Firmin
- Born: 22 July 1937 Renneville, France
- Died: 2 May 1977 (aged 39) Verneuil-sur-Avre, France

Cycling career
- Sport: Cycling
- Discipline: Road
- Role: Rider

Major wins
- Wearing yellow jersey for one day

Jean-Claude Lebaube (22 July 1937 in Renneville, France – 2 May 1977 in Verneuil-sur-Avre, Eure, France) was a French professional road bicycle racer. He was professional from 1961 to 1969 and won 8 victories. He rode in 7 editions of the Tour de France where he wore the yellow jersey as leader of the general classification for one day in 1966. Other career highlights included a stage win in the Dauphiné Libéré and the Tour de Luxembourg.

== Palmarès ==
1961
Tour de Tunesie
1963
Gouesnou
Tour du Sud-Est
Tour de France:

4th place overall classification

1965
Tour de France:

5th place overall classification

1966
Boucles Pertuisiennes
Tour de France:

Wearing yellow jersey for one day
