= Adriano Durante =

Italian cyclist (1940–2009)

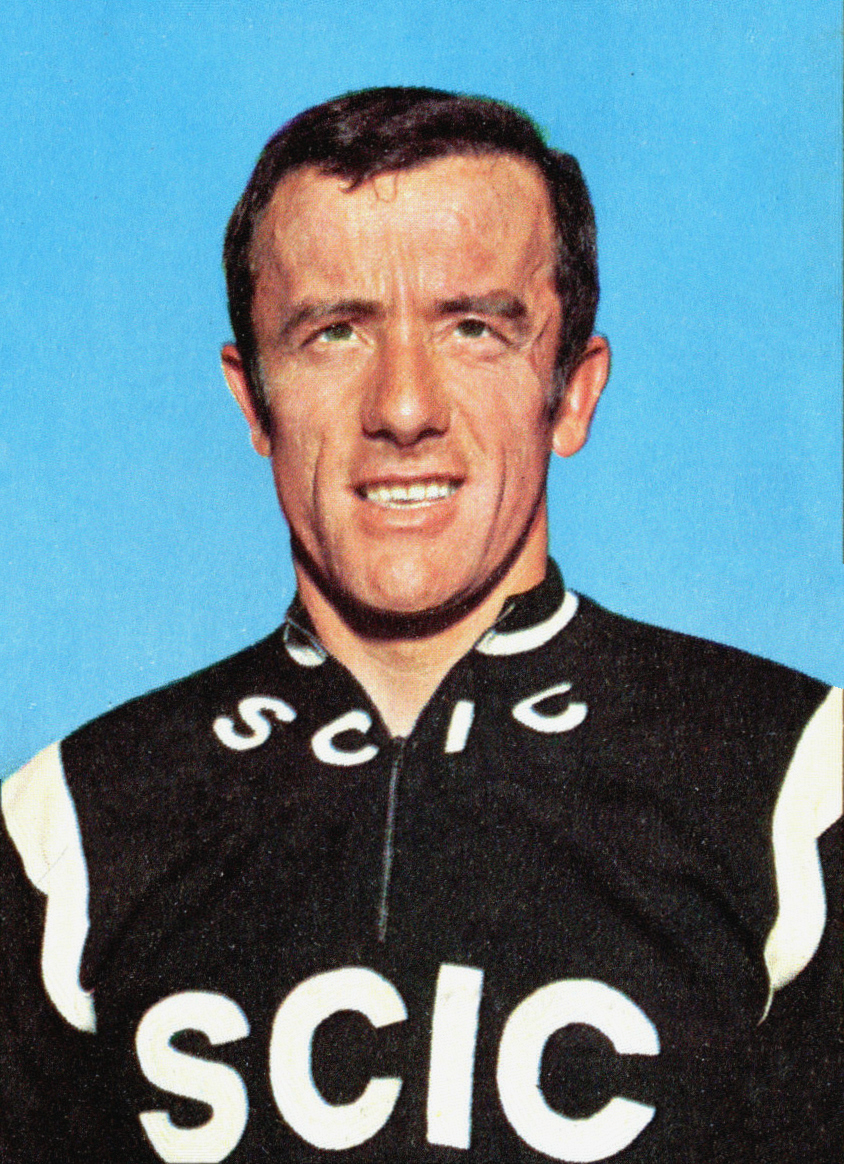
- Adriano Durante in 1969–70

Personal information
- Full name: Adriano Durante
- Born: 24 July 1940 Treviso, Italy
- Died: 23 June 2009 (aged 68) Oderzo, Italy

Cycling career
- Sport: Cycling
- Discipline: Road
- Role: Rider

Major wins
- 3 stages Giro d'Italia; 1 stage Tour de France

Adriano Durante (24 July 1940 – 23 June 2009) was an Italian professional road bicycle racer.

== Major results ==
1963
Giro del Lazio
Giro del Piemonte
Milano–Vignola
Giro di Campania
Giro d'Italia:

Winner stage 8

1964
Giro della Romagna
1965
Col San Martino
Coppa Bernocchi
Giro della Provincia di Reggio Calabria
Giro d'Italia:

Winner stages 4 and 9

Tour de France:

Winner stage 13

1966
Milano–Vignola
1967
Aiello del Friuli
1968
Gran Premio Industria e Commercio di Prato
1970
Milano–Vignola
