= Rogelio Hernández =

Spanish cyclist (1934–2022)

Personal information
- Born: 14 April 1934 Astillero, Spain
- Died: 9 April 2022 (aged 87)

Cycling career
- Sport: Cycling
- Role: Rider

Rogelio Hernández (14 April 1934 – 9 April 2022) was a Spanish racing cyclist. He rode in the 1963 Tour de France. Hernández died on 9 April 2022, at the age of 87.
