= Jean-Claude Lefebvre =

French cyclist

Personal information
- Born: 11 January 1933
- Died: 14 October 2014 (aged 81)

Cycling career
- Sport: Cycling
- Role: Rider

Jean-Claude Lefebvre (11 January 1933 – 14 October 2014) was a French racing cyclist. He rode in the 1959 Tour de France.
