= André Foucher (cyclist) =

French cyclist (1933–2025)

Personal information
- Full name: André Foucher
- Born: 2 October 1933 Cuillé, France
- Died: 4 May 2025 (aged 91)

Cycling career
- Sport: Cycling
- Discipline: Road
- Role: Rider

Major wins
- Grand Prix du Midi Libre (1964, 1965)

André Foucher (2 October 1933 – 4 May 2025) was a French professional road bicycle racer. He died on 4 May 2025, at the age of 91.

== Major results ==
1955
France national military road race champion
1958
France national independent road race champion
1959
GP de l'Equipe
1960
Circuit Cycliste de la Sarthe
Noyal
1962
GP Amitié Puteaux
Perros-Guirec
Puteaux
1963
Châteaugiron
Giron
1964
Grand Prix du Midi Libre
Preslin
Tour de France:

6th place overall classification

1965
Craon
Grand Prix du Midi Libre
Henon
Querrien
1966
Châteaugiron
Saint-Just
1967
Hennebont
1968
Plouëc-du-Trieux
