= Leo van Dongen =

Dutch cyclist

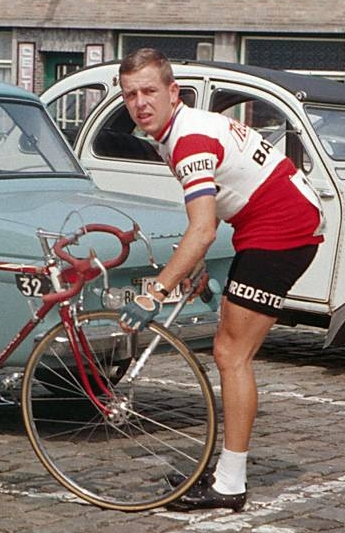
- Leo van Dongen in 1967

Personal information
- Born: 2 January 1942 Made, Netherlands
- Died: 17 June 2011 (aged 69) Oosterhout, Netherlands

Cycling career
- Sport: Cycling
- Role: Rider

Leo van Dongen (2 January 1942 – 17 June 2011) was a Dutch road racing cyclist who competed professionally between 1962 and 1970. He won the Ronde van Overijssel, Ronde van Limburg and Delta Profronde in 1963. He rode the Tour de France in 1964–66 and finished second in two stages in 1965.
