= Rik Wouters (cyclist) =

Dutch cyclist

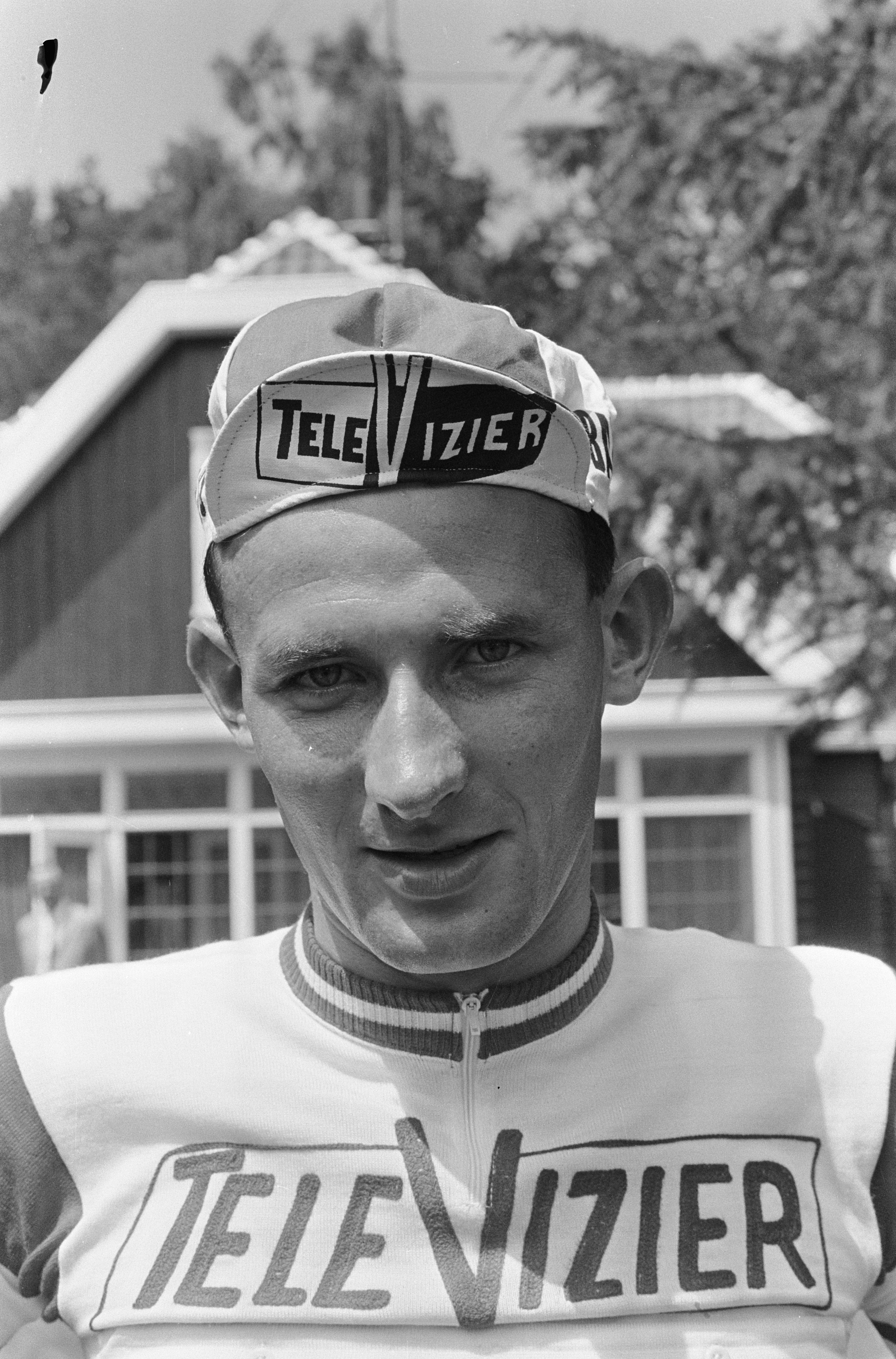
- Rik Wouters

Personal information
- Born: 5 August 1942 (age 84)

Cycling career
- Sport: Cycling
- Role: Rider

Rik Wouters (born 5 August 1942) is a Dutch racing cyclist. He rode in the 1964 Tour de France.
