= August Verhaegen =

Belgian cyclist

Personal information
- Born: 5 August 1941
- Died: 7 September 2012 (aged 71)

Cycling career
- Sport: Cycling
- Role: Rider

August Verhaegen (5 August 1941 – 7 September 2012) was a Belgian racing cyclist. He rode in the 1963 Tour de France.
