= List of teams and cyclists in the 1966 Tour de France =

List of cyclists

The 1966 Tour de France started with 130 cyclists, divided into 13 teams of 10 cyclists:

- Ford France–Hutchinson
- Kamomé–Dilecta–Dunlop
- Mercier–BP–Hutchinson
- Pelforth–Sauvage–Lejeune–Wolber
- Peugeot–BP–Michelin
- Fagor
- Filotex–Fiorelli
- Kas–Kaskol
- Mann–Grundig
- Molteni–Hutchinson
- Smith's
- Solo–Superia
- Televizier–Batavus

Felice Gimondi, winner of the 1965 Tour de France, did not defend his title.

== Start list ==
=== By team ===
Ford France–Hutchinson
| No. | Rider | Pos. |
|---|---|---|
| 1 | Lucien Aimar (FRA) | 1 |
| 2 | Jacques Anquetil (FRA) | DNF |
| 3 | Arie den Hartog (NED) | 45 |
| 4 | Vin Denson (GBR) | DNF |
| 5 | Pierre Everaert (FRA) | DNF |
| 6 | Michel Grain (FRA) | 66 |
| 7 | Julio Jiménez (ESP) | 13 |
| 8 | Jean Milesi (FRA) | 79 |
| 9 | Anatole Novak (FRA) | DNF |
| 10 | Jean Stablinski (FRA) | 61 |

Kamomé–Dilecta–Dunlop
| No. | Rider | Pos. |
|---|---|---|
| 11 | Maurice Benet (FRA) | 59 |
| 12 | Pierre Beuffeuil (FRA) | 71 |
| 13 | André Darrigade (FRA) | 62 |
| 14 | Jean Dupont (FRA) | DNF |
| 15 | Jean-Claude Lebaube (FRA) | DNF |
| 16 | Raymond Lebreton (FRA) | DNF |
| 17 | Alain Le Grèves (FRA) | DNF |
| 18 | Raymond Mastrotto (FRA) | 50 |
| 19 | Joseph Novales (FRA) | DNF |
| 20 | Louis Rostollan (FRA) | 47 |

Mercier–BP–Hutchinson
| No. | Rider | Pos. |
|---|---|---|
| 21 | Gilbert Bellone (FRA) | 78 |
| 22 | Jean-Louis Bodin (FRA) | DNF |
| 23 | Robert Cazala (FRA) | 80 |
| 24 | Jean-Pierre Genet (FRA) | DNF |
| 25 | Henri Guimbard (FRA) | DNF |
| 26 | Raymond Poulidor (FRA) | 3 |
| 27 | Jozef Spruyt (BEL) | DNF |
| 28 | Roger Swerts (BEL) | 63 |
| 29 | Victor Van Schil (BEL) | 72 |
| 30 | Rolf Wolfshohl (FRG) | 39 |

Pelforth–Sauvage–Lejeune–Wolber
| No. | Rider | Pos. |
|---|---|---|
| 31 | Édouard Delberghe (FRA) | 58 |
| 32 | Julien Delocht (BEL) | DNF |
| 33 | André Foucher (FRA) | 43 |
| 34 | Georges Groussard (FRA) | 30 |
| 35 | Maurice Izier (FRA) | 55 |
| 36 | Jan Janssen (NED) | 2 |
| 37 | Jean-Claude Lefebvre (FRA) | DNF |
| 38 | Roger Milliot (FRA) | DNF |
| 39 | Willy Monty (BEL) | 19 |
| 40 | Johny Schleck (LUX) | 35 |

Peugeot–BP–Michelin
| No. | Rider | Pos. |
|---|---|---|
| 41 | Ferdinand Bracke (BEL) | 32 |
| 42 | Raymond Delisle (FRA) | 21 |
| 43 | Henri Duez (FRA) | 51 |
| 44 | Karl-Heinz Kunde (FRG) | 9 |
| 45 | Désiré Letort (FRA) | 57 |
| 46 | Roger Pingeon (FRA) | 8 |
| 47 | Christian Raymond (FRA) | 54 |
| 48 | Tom Simpson (GBR) | DNF |
| 49 | Georges Van Coningsloo (BEL) | DNF |
| 50 | André Zimmermann (FRA) | 23 |

Fagor
| No. | Rider | Pos. |
|---|---|---|
| 51 | Jesús Aranzabal (ESP) | 48 |
| 52 | Mariano Díaz (ESP) | 20 |
| 53 | José María Errandonea (ESP) | 56 |
| 54 | Ginés Garcia (ESP) | 28 |
| 55 | José Manuel López (ESP) | 41 |
| 56 | Esteban Martín (ESP) | 22 |
| 57 | Ramón Mendiburu (ESP) | 49 |
| 58 | Luis Otaño (ESP) | 26 |
| 59 | Domingo Perurena (ESP) | 18 |
| 60 | Luis Pedro Santamarina (ESP) | 29 |

Filotex–Fiorelli
| No. | Rider | Pos. |
|---|---|---|
| 61 | Franco Bitossi (ITA) | 17 |
| 62 | Guido Carlesi (ITA) | DNF |
| 63 | Vittorio Chiarini (ITA) | DNF |
| 64 | Ugo Colombo (ITA) | 44 |
| 65 | Pasquale Fabbri (ITA) | DNF |
| 66 | Guerrando Lenzi (ITA) | DNF |
| 67 | Paolo Mannucci (ITA) | 82 |
| 68 | Guido Marcello Mugnaini (ITA) | 5 |
| 69 | Rollando Picchiotti (ITA) | DNF |
| 70 | Mario Zanchi (ITA) | DNF |

Kas–Kaskol
| No. | Rider | Pos. |
|---|---|---|
| 71 | Carlos Echeverría (ESP) | 25 |
| 72 | Sebastián Elorza (ESP) | 31 |
| 73 | Francisco Gabica (ESP) | 7 |
| 74 | Joaquim Galera (ESP) | 15 |
| 75 | Antonio Gómez del Moral (ESP) | 11 |
| 76 | Aurelio González (ESP) | 24 |
| 77 | José Antonio Momeñe (ESP) | 4 |
| 78 | Gregorio San Miguel (ESP) | 37 |
| 79 | Valentín Uriona (ESP) | 14 |
| 80 | Eusebio Vélez (ESP) | DNF |

Mann–Grundig
| No. | Rider | Pos. |
|---|---|---|
| 81 | Jozef Boons (BEL) | DNF |
| 82 | Walter Boucquet (BEL) | 70 |
| 83 | Jan Boonen (BEL) | DNF |
| 84 | Jan Nolmans (BEL) | DNF |
| 85 | Jos Huysmans (BEL) | 16 |
| 86 | Willy In ’t Ven (BEL) | 74 |
| 87 | André Messelis (BEL) | 52 |
| 88 | Willy Vannitsen (BEL) | DNF |
| 89 | Herman Van Springel (BEL) | 6 |
| 90 | Herman Vrancken (BEL) | 65 |

Molteni–Hutchinson
| No. | Rider | Pos. |
|---|---|---|
| 91 | Rudi Altig (FRG) | 12 |
| 92 | Willi Altig (FRG) | DNF |
| 93 | René Binggeli (SUI) | DNF |
| 94 | Ambrogio Colombo (ITA) | DNF |
| 95 | Tommaso de Pra (ITA) | DNF |
| 96 | Guido De Rosso (ITA) | DNF |
| 97 | Giuseppe Fezzardi (ITA) | 42 |
| 98 | Giacomo Fornoni (ITA) | DNF |
| 99 | Albertus Geldermans (NED) | 69 |
| 100 | Guido Neri (ITA) | 77 |

Smith's
| No. | Rider | Pos. |
|---|---|---|
| 101 | Frans Brands (BEL) | 33 |
| 102 | Joseph Mathy (BEL) | DNF |
| 103 | Yvo Molenaers (BEL) | 81 |
| 104 | Willy Planckaert (BEL) | 40 |
| 105 | Guido Reybrouck (BEL) | 53 |
| 106 | Edy Schütz (LUX) | 34 |
| 107 | Georges Vandenberghe (BEL) | 60 |
| 108 | Martin Van Den Bossche (BEL) | 10 |
| 109 | Willy Van Den Eynde (BEL) | DNF |
| 110 | Albert Van Vlierberghe (BEL) | DNF |

Solo–Superia
| No. | Rider | Pos. |
|---|---|---|
| 111 | Noël De Pauw (BEL) | DNF |
| 112 | Willy Derboven (BEL) | DNF |
| 113 | Armand Desmet (BEL) | 27 |
| 114 | Henri De Wolf (BEL) | 76 |
| 115 | Mathieu Maes (BEL) | DNF |
| 116 | Jean Monteyne (BEL) | 67 |
| 117 | Edward Sels (BEL) | 38 |
| 118 | Edgard Sorgeloos (BEL) | DNF |
| 119 | Julien Stevens (BEL) | DNF |
| 120 | Rik Van Looy (BEL) | DNF |

Televizier–Batavus
| No. | Rider | Pos. |
|---|---|---|
| 121 | Jo de Roo (NED) | DNF |
| 122 | Cees Haast (NED) | 36 |
| 123 | Huub Harings (NED) | DNF |
| 124 | Gerben Karstens (NED) | 46 |
| 125 | Bas Maliepaard (NED) | DNF |
| 126 | Henk Nijdam (NED) | 73 |
| 127 | Jos van der Vleuten (NED) | 75 |
| 128 | Leo van Dongen (NED) | DNF |
| 129 | Rik Wouters (NED) | 68 |
| 130 | Huub Zilverberg (NED) | 64 |

=== By rider ===
Legend
| No. | Starting number worn by the rider during the Tour |
| Pos. | Position in the general classification |
| DNF | Denotes a rider who did not finish |

| No. | Name | Nationality | Team | Pos. | Ref |
|---|---|---|---|---|---|
| 1 | Lucien Aimar | France | Ford France–Hutchinson | 1 | |
| 2 | Jacques Anquetil | France | Ford France–Hutchinson | DNF | |
| 3 | Arie den Hartog | Netherlands | Ford France–Hutchinson | 45 | |
| 4 | Vin Denson | Great Britain | Ford France–Hutchinson | DNF | |
| 5 | Pierre Everaert | France | Ford France–Hutchinson | DNF | |
| 6 | Michel Grain | France | Ford France–Hutchinson | 66 | |
| 7 | Julio Jiménez | Spain | Ford France–Hutchinson | 13 | |
| 8 | Jean Milesi | France | Ford France–Hutchinson | 79 | |
| 9 | Anatole Novak | France | Ford France–Hutchinson | DNF | |
| 10 | Jean Stablinski | France | Ford France–Hutchinson | 61 | |
| 11 | Maurice Benet | France | Kamomé–Dilecta–Dunlop | 59 | |
| 12 | Pierre Beuffeuil | France | Kamomé–Dilecta–Dunlop | 71 | |
| 13 | André Darrigade | France | Kamomé–Dilecta–Dunlop | 62 | |
| 14 | Jean Dupont | France | Kamomé–Dilecta–Dunlop | DNF | |
| 15 | Jean-Claude Lebaube | France | Kamomé–Dilecta–Dunlop | DNF | |
| 16 | Raymond Lebreton | France | Kamomé–Dilecta–Dunlop | DNF | |
| 17 | Alain Le Grèves | France | Kamomé–Dilecta–Dunlop | DNF | |
| 18 | Raymond Mastrotto | France | Kamomé–Dilecta–Dunlop | 50 | |
| 19 | Joseph Novales | France | Kamomé–Dilecta–Dunlop | DNF | |
| 20 | Louis Rostollan | France | Kamomé–Dilecta–Dunlop | 47 | |
| 21 | Gilbert Bellone | France | Mercier–BP–Hutchinson | 78 | |
| 22 | Jean-Louis Bodin | France | Mercier–BP–Hutchinson | DNF | |
| 23 | Robert Cazala | France | Mercier–BP–Hutchinson | 80 | |
| 24 | Jean-Pierre Genet | France | Mercier–BP–Hutchinson | DNF | |
| 25 | Henri Guimbard | France | Mercier–BP–Hutchinson | DNF | |
| 26 | Raymond Poulidor | France | Mercier–BP–Hutchinson | 3 | |
| 27 | Jozef Spruyt | Belgium | Mercier–BP–Hutchinson | DNF | |
| 28 | Roger Swerts | Belgium | Mercier–BP–Hutchinson | 63 | |
| 29 | Victor Van Schil | Belgium | Mercier–BP–Hutchinson | 72 | |
| 30 | Rolf Wolfshohl | West Germany | Mercier–BP–Hutchinson | 39 | |
| 31 | Édouard Delberghe | France | Pelforth–Sauvage–Lejeune–Wolber | 58 | |
| 32 | Julien Delocht | Belgium | Pelforth–Sauvage–Lejeune–Wolber | DNF | |
| 33 | André Foucher | France | Pelforth–Sauvage–Lejeune–Wolber | 43 | |
| 34 | Georges Groussard | France | Pelforth–Sauvage–Lejeune–Wolber | 30 | |
| 35 | Maurice Izier | France | Pelforth–Sauvage–Lejeune–Wolber | 55 | |
| 36 | Jan Janssen | Netherlands | Pelforth–Sauvage–Lejeune–Wolber | 2 | |
| 37 | Jean-Claude Lefebvre | France | Pelforth–Sauvage–Lejeune–Wolber | DNF | |
| 38 | Roger Milliot | France | Pelforth–Sauvage–Lejeune–Wolber | DNF | |
| 39 | Willy Monty | Belgium | Pelforth–Sauvage–Lejeune–Wolber | 19 | |
| 40 | Johny Schleck | Luxembourg | Pelforth–Sauvage–Lejeune–Wolber | 35 | |
| 41 | Ferdinand Bracke | Belgium | Peugeot–BP–Michelin | 32 | |
| 42 | Raymond Delisle | France | Peugeot–BP–Michelin | 21 | |
| 43 | Henri Duez | France | Peugeot–BP–Michelin | 51 | |
| 44 | Karl-Heinz Kunde | West Germany | Peugeot–BP–Michelin | 9 | |
| 45 | Désiré Letort | France | Peugeot–BP–Michelin | 57 | |
| 46 | Roger Pingeon | France | Peugeot–BP–Michelin | 8 | |
| 47 | Christian Raymond | France | Peugeot–BP–Michelin | 54 | |
| 48 | Tom Simpson | Great Britain | Peugeot–BP–Michelin | DNF | |
| 49 | Georges Van Coningsloo | Belgium | Peugeot–BP–Michelin | DNF | |
| 50 | André Zimmermann | France | Peugeot–BP–Michelin | 23 | |
| 51 | Jesús Aranzabal | Spain | Fagor | 48 | |
| 52 | Mariano Díaz | Spain | Fagor | 20 | |
| 53 | José María Errandonea | Spain | Fagor | 56 | |
| 54 | Ginés Garcia | Spain | Fagor | 28 | |
| 55 | José Manuel López | Spain | Fagor | 41 | |
| 56 | Esteban Martín | Spain | Fagor | 22 | |
| 57 | Ramón Mendiburu | Spain | Fagor | 49 | |
| 58 | Luis Otaño | Spain | Fagor | 26 | |
| 59 | Domingo Perurena | Spain | Fagor | 18 | |
| 60 | Luis Pedro Santamarina | Spain | Fagor | 29 | |
| 61 | Franco Bitossi | Italy | Filotex–Fiorelli | 17 | |
| 62 | Guido Carlesi | Italy | Filotex–Fiorelli | DNF | |
| 63 | Vittorio Chiarini | Italy | Filotex–Fiorelli | DNF | |
| 64 | Ugo Colombo | Italy | Filotex–Fiorelli | 44 | |
| 65 | Pasquale Fabbri | Italy | Filotex–Fiorelli | DNF | |
| 66 | Guerrando Lenzi | Italy | Filotex–Fiorelli | DNF | |
| 67 | Paolo Mannucci | Italy | Filotex–Fiorelli | 82 | |
| 68 | Guido Marcello Mugnaini | Italy | Filotex–Fiorelli | 5 | |
| 69 | Rollando Picchiotti | Italy | Filotex–Fiorelli | DNF | |
| 70 | Mario Zanchi | Italy | Filotex–Fiorelli | DNF | |
| 71 | Carlos Echeverría | Spain | Kas–Kaskol | 25 | |
| 72 | Sebastián Elorza | Spain | Kas–Kaskol | 31 | |
| 73 | Francisco Gabica | Spain | Kas–Kaskol | 7 | |
| 74 | Joaquim Galera | Spain | Kas–Kaskol | 15 | |
| 75 | Antonio Gómez del Moral | Spain | Kas–Kaskol | 11 | |
| 76 | Aurelio González | Spain | Kas–Kaskol | 24 | |
| 77 | José Antonio Momeñe | Spain | Kas–Kaskol | 4 | |
| 78 | Gregorio San Miguel | Spain | Kas–Kaskol | 37 | |
| 79 | Valentín Uriona | Spain | Kas–Kaskol | 14 | |
| 80 | Eusebio Vélez | Spain | Kas–Kaskol | DNF | |
| 81 | Jozef Boons | Belgium | Mann–Grundig | DNF | |
| 82 | Walter Boucquet | Belgium | Mann–Grundig | 70 | |
| 83 | Jan Boonen | Belgium | Mann–Grundig | DNF | |
| 84 | Jan Nolmans | Belgium | Mann–Grundig | DNF | |
| 85 | Jos Huysmans | Belgium | Mann–Grundig | 16 | |
| 86 | Willy In ’t Ven | Belgium | Mann–Grundig | 74 | |
| 87 | André Messelis | Belgium | Mann–Grundig | 52 | |
| 88 | Willy Vannitsen | Belgium | Mann–Grundig | DNF | |
| 89 | Herman Van Springel | Belgium | Mann–Grundig | 6 | |
| 90 | Herman Vrancken | Belgium | Mann–Grundig | 65 | |
| 91 | Rudi Altig | West Germany | Molteni–Hutchinson | 12 | |
| 92 | Willi Altig | West Germany | Molteni–Hutchinson | DNF | |
| 93 | René Binggeli | Switzerland | Molteni–Hutchinson | DNF | |
| 94 | Ambrogio Colombo | Italy | Molteni–Hutchinson | DNF | |
| 95 | Tommaso de Pra | Italy | Molteni–Hutchinson | DNF | |
| 96 | Guido De Rosso | Italy | Molteni–Hutchinson | DNF | |
| 97 | Giuseppe Fezzardi | Italy | Molteni–Hutchinson | 42 | |
| 98 | Giacomo Fornoni | Italy | Molteni–Hutchinson | DNF | |
| 99 | Albertus Geldermans | Netherlands | Molteni–Hutchinson | 69 | |
| 100 | Guido Neri | Italy | Molteni–Hutchinson | 77 | |
| 101 | Frans Brands | Belgium | Smith's | 33 | |
| 102 | Joseph Mathy | Belgium | Smith's | DNF | |
| 103 | Yvo Molenaers | Belgium | Smith's | 81 | |
| 104 | Willy Planckaert | Belgium | Smith's | 40 | |
| 105 | Guido Reybrouck | Belgium | Smith's | 53 | |
| 106 | Edy Schütz | Luxembourg | Smith's | 34 | |
| 107 | Georges Vandenberghe | Belgium | Smith's | 60 | |
| 108 | Martin Van Den Bossche | Belgium | Smith's | 10 | |
| 109 | Willy Van den Eynde | Belgium | Smith's | DNF | |
| 110 | Albert Van Vlierberghe | Belgium | Smith's | DNF | |
| 111 | Noël De Pauw | Belgium | Solo–Superia | DNF | |
| 112 | Willy Derboven | Belgium | Solo–Superia | DNF | |
| 113 | Armand Desmet | Belgium | Solo–Superia | 27 | |
| 114 | Henri De Wolf | Belgium | Solo–Superia | 76 | |
| 115 | Mathieu Maes | Belgium | Solo–Superia | DNF | |
| 116 | Jean Monteyne | Belgium | Solo–Superia | 67 | |
| 117 | Edward Sels | Belgium | Solo–Superia | 38 | |
| 118 | Edgard Sorgeloos | Belgium | Solo–Superia | DNF | |
| 119 | Julien Stevens | Belgium | Solo–Superia | DNF | |
| 120 | Rik Van Looy | Belgium | Solo–Superia | DNF | |
| 121 | Jo de Roo | Netherlands | Televizier–Batavus | DNF | |
| 122 | Cees Haast | Netherlands | Televizier–Batavus | 36 | |
| 123 | Huub Harings | Netherlands | Televizier–Batavus | DNF | |
| 124 | Gerben Karstens | Netherlands | Televizier–Batavus | 46 | |
| 125 | Bas Maliepaard | Netherlands | Televizier–Batavus | DNF | |
| 126 | Henk Nijdam | Netherlands | Televizier–Batavus | 73 | |
| 127 | Jos van der Vleuten | Netherlands | Televizier–Batavus | 75 | |
| 128 | Leo van Dongen | Netherlands | Televizier–Batavus | DNF | |
| 129 | Rik Wouters | Netherlands | Televizier–Batavus | 68 | |
| 130 | Huub Zilverberg | Netherlands | Televizier–Batavus | 64 | |
