= Cobbled classics =

Cycling classics held in March and April

The cobbled classics are four cycling classics held in March and April. Cobblestones, like mountainous terrain, are important elements in courses of cycling. Many classic cycle races in northwestern Europe contain cobbled sections. The two Monuments of this race type are the Tour of Flanders and Paris–Roubaix, with over 20 cobbled sectors.

== History ==
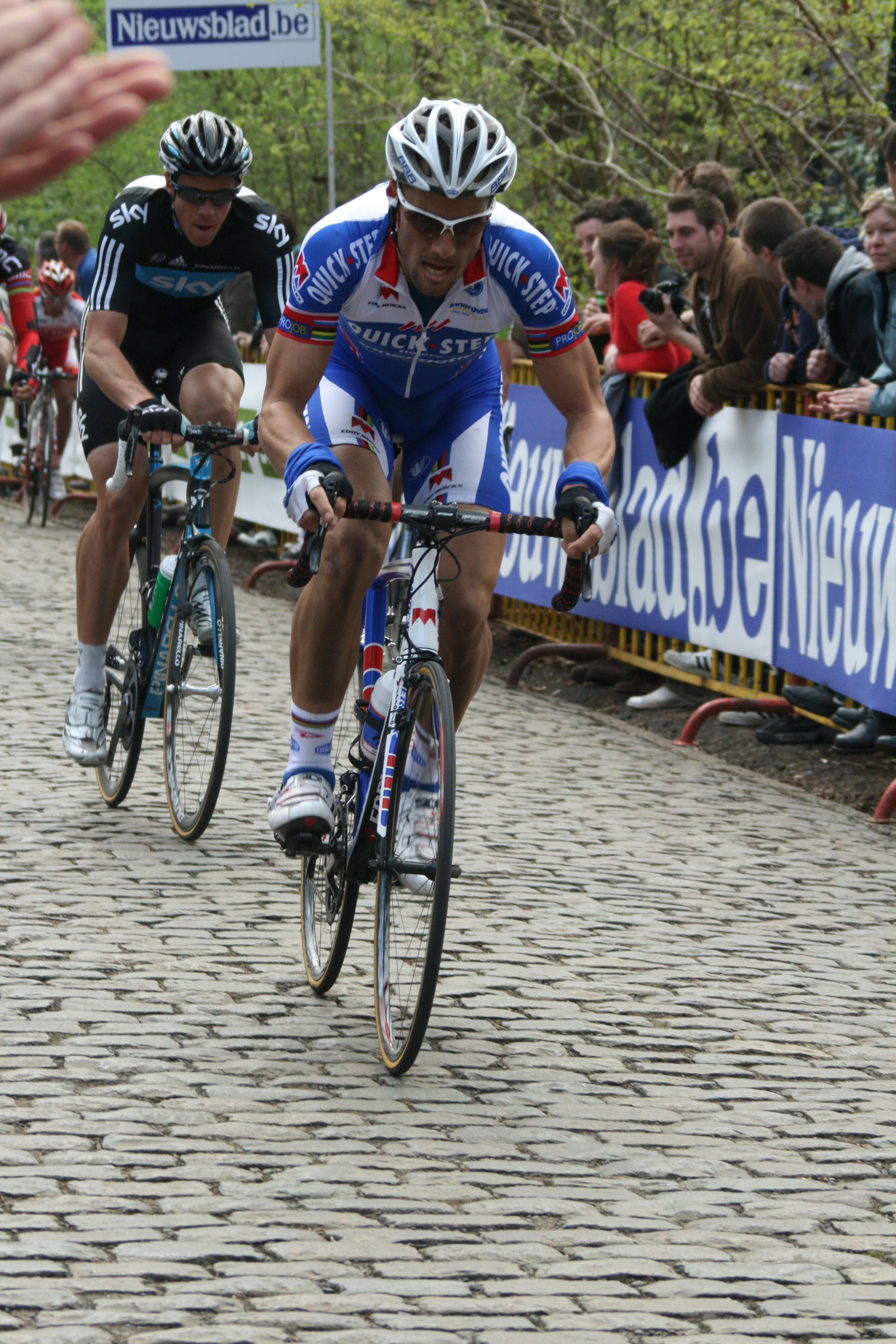
Tom Boonen is the only rider to win all cobbled classics in a single season (2012)

The first race with cobbled sections is Omloop Het Nieuwsblad, which traditionally opens the Belgian classics season, followed the next day by Kuurne–Brussels–Kuurne. Starting in late March, the Flemish Cycling Week (Vlaamse Wielerweek) kicks off the most important period for cobbled cycling classics. Currently it features the Driedaagse van De Panne on Wednesday (formerly a stage race, now a one-day event), the E3 Harelbeke on Friday, and Gent–Wevelgem on Sunday. The following week, Dwars door Vlaanderen keeps the riders busy, concluding with the Monument Tour of Flanders on Sunday. The Scheldeprijs on the following Wednesday prepare the riders for the historical Paris–Roubaix (another Monument), which ends the cobbled classics.

Among the cobbled cycling races, the three most historical are usually held on consecutive Sundays in March and April: Gent–Wevelgem, Tour of Flanders and Paris–Roubaix. Gent–Wevelgem has lost a lot of its historical status due to its relatively easy route. The E3 Harelbeke is considered to be harder and thus better preparation for the Ronde and Roubaix. In 2012, both races received equal status on the UCI World Tour. In 2017, Omloop Het Nieuwsblad (the opening event of the Belgian cycling season, as well as the first race of the year in Northwestern Europe) and Dwars door Vlaanderen became World Tour races.

In 2012, Belgian rider Tom Boonen managed to win all four races in the same season, as the first and only rider to do so.

In the 2010s, some of the races have been joined by equivalent races for women – Gent–Wevelgem for Women, Tour of Flanders for Women and Paris–Roubaix Femmes.

== Winners ==
=== Men's (since 1990) ===
Year	E3 Harelbeke (BEL)	Gent–Wevelgem (BEL)	Tour of Flanders (BEL)	Paris–Roubaix (FRA)
1990	Søren Lilholt (DEN)	Herman Frison (BEL)	Moreno Argentin (ITA)	Eddy Planckaert (BEL)
1991	Olaf Ludwig (GER)	Djamolidine Abdoujaparov (UZB)	Edwig van Hooydonck (BEL)	Marc Madiot (FRA)
1992	Johan Museeuw (BEL) (1/8)	Mario Cipollini (ITA) (1/4)	Jacky Durand (FRA)	Gilbert Duclos-Lassalle (FRA) (1/2)
1993	Mario Cipollini (ITA) (2/4)	Mario Cipollini (ITA) (3/4)	Johan Museeuw (BEL) (2/8)	Gilbert Duclos-Lassalle (FRA) (1/2)
1994	Andrei Tchmil (BEL) (1/4)	Wilfried Peeters (BEL)	Gianni Bugno (ITA)	Andrei Tchmil (BEL) (2/4)
1995	Bart Leysen (BEL)	Lars Michaelsen (DEN)	Johan Museeuw (BEL) (3/8)	Franco Ballerini (ITA) (1/2)
1996	Carlo Bomans (BEL)	Tom Steels (BEL) (1/2)	Michele Bartoli (ITA)	Johan Museeuw (BEL) (4/8)
1997	Hendrik Van Dijck (BEL)	Philippe Gaumont (FRA)	Rolf Sørensen (DEN)	Frédéric Guesdon (FRA)
1998	Johan Museeuw (BEL) (5/8)	Frank Vandenbroucke (BEL)	Johan Museeuw (BEL) (6/8)	Franco Ballerini (ITA) (2/2)
1999	Peter Van Petegem (BEL) (1/4)	Tom Steels (BEL) (2/2)	Peter Van Petegem (BEL) (2/4)	Andrea Tafi (ITA) (1/2)
2000	Sergei Ivanov (RUS)	Geert Van Bondt (BEL)	Andrei Tchmil (BEL) (3/4)	Johan Museeuw (BEL) (7/8)
2001	Andrei Tchmil (BEL) (4/4)	George Hincapie (USA)	Gianluca Bortolami (ITA)	Servais Knaven (NED)
2002	Dario Pieri (ITA)	Mario Cipollini (ITA) (4/4)	Andrea Tafi (ITA) (2/2)	Johan Museeuw (BEL) (8/8)
2003	Steven de Jongh (NED)	Andreas Klier (GER)	Peter Van Petegem (BEL) (3/4)	Peter Van Petegem (BEL) (4/4)
2004	Tom Boonen (BEL) (1/15)	Tom Boonen (BEL) (2/15)	Steffen Wesemann (GER)	Magnus Bäckstedt (SWE)
2005	Tom Boonen (BEL) (3/15)	Nico Mattan (BEL)	Tom Boonen (BEL) (4/15)	Tom Boonen (BEL) (5/15)
2006	Tom Boonen (BEL) (6/15)	Thor Hushovd (NOR)	Tom Boonen (BEL) (7/15)	Fabian Cancellara (SUI) (1/9)
2007	Tom Boonen (BEL) (8/15)	Marcus Burghardt (GER)	Alessandro Ballan (ITA)	Stuart O'Grady (AUS)
2008	Kurt Asle Arvesen (NOR)	Óscar Freire (ESP)	Stijn Devolder (BEL) (1/2)	Tom Boonen (BEL) (9/15)
2009	Filippo Pozzato (ITA)	Edvald Boasson Hagen (NOR)	Stijn Devolder (BEL) (2/2)	Tom Boonen (BEL) (10/15)
2010	Fabian Cancellara (SUI) (2/9)	Bernhard Eisel (AUT)	Fabian Cancellara (SUI) (3/9)	Fabian Cancellara (SUI) (4/9)
2011	Fabian Cancellara (SUI) (5/9)	Tom Boonen (BEL) (11/15)	Nick Nuyens (BEL)	Johan Vansummeren (BEL)
2012	Tom Boonen (BEL) (12/15)	Tom Boonen (BEL) (13/15)	Tom Boonen (BEL) (14/15)	Tom Boonen (BEL) (15/15)
2013	Fabian Cancellara (SUI) (6/9)	Peter Sagan (SVK) (1/6)	Fabian Cancellara (SUI) (7/9)	Fabian Cancellara (SUI) (8/9)
2014	Peter Sagan (SVK) (2/6)	John Degenkolb (GER) (1/2)	Fabian Cancellara (SUI) (9/9)	Niki Terpstra (NED) (1/3)
2015	Geraint Thomas (GBR)	Luca Paolini (ITA)	Alexander Kristoff (NOR) (1/2)	John Degenkolb (GER) (2/2)
2016	Michał Kwiatkowski (POL)	Peter Sagan (SVK) (3/6)	Peter Sagan (SVK) (4/6)	Mathew Hayman (AUS)
2017	Greg Van Avermaet (BEL) (1/3)	Greg Van Avermaet (BEL) (2/3)	Philippe Gilbert (BEL) (1/2)	Greg Van Avermaet (BEL) (3/3)
2018	Niki Terpstra (NED) (2/3)	Peter Sagan (SVK) (5/6)	Niki Terpstra (NED) (3/3)	Peter Sagan (SVK) (6/6)
2019	Zdeněk Štybar (CZE)	Alexander Kristoff (NOR) (2/2)	Alberto Bettiol (ITA)	Philippe Gilbert (BEL) (2/2)
2020	Cancelled due to COVID-19 pandemic	Mads Pedersen (DEN) (1/3)	Mathieu van der Poel (NED) (1/9)	Cancelled due to COVID-19 pandemic
2021	Kasper Asgreen (DEN) (1/2)	Wout van Aert (BEL) (1/4)	Kasper Asgreen (DEN) (2/2)	Sonny Colbrelli (ITA)
2022	Wout van Aert (BEL) (2/4)	Biniam Girmay (ERI)	Mathieu van der Poel (NED) (2/9)	Dylan van Baarle (NED)
2023	Wout van Aert (BEL) (3/4)	Christophe Laporte (FRA)	Tadej Pogačar (SLO) (1/3)	Mathieu van der Poel (NED) (3/9)
2024	Mathieu van der Poel (NED) (4/9)	Mads Pedersen (DEN) (2/3)	Mathieu Van Der Poel (NED) (5/9)	Mathieu Van Der Poel (NED) (6/9)
2025	Mathieu van der Poel (NED) (7/9)	Mads Pedersen (DEN) (3/3)	Tadej Pogačar (SLO) (2/3)	Mathieu van der Poel (NED) (8/9)
2026	Mathieu van der Poel (NED) (9/9)	Jasper Philipsen (BEL)	Tadej Pogačar (SLO) (3/3)	Wout van Aert (BEL) (4/4)
Year	E3 Harelbeke (BEL)	Gent–Wevelgem (BEL)	Tour of Flanders (BEL)	Paris–Roubaix (FRA)

=== Women's (since 2004) ===
Year	Gent–Wevelgem (BEL)	Tour of Flanders for Women (BEL)	Paris–Roubaix Femmes (FRA)
2004	Race not held	Zoulfia Zabirova (RUS)	Race not held
2005	Race not held	Mirjam Melchers-van Poppel (NED) (1/2)	Race not held
2006	Race not held	Mirjam Melchers-van Poppel (NED) (2/2)	Race not held
2007	Race not held	Nicole Cooke (GBR)	Race not held
2008	Race not held	Judith Arndt (GER) (1/2)	Race not held
2009	Race not held	Ina-Yoko Teutenberg (GER)	Race not held
2010	Race not held	Grace Verbeke (BEL)	Race not held
2011	Race not held	Annemiek van Vleuten (NED) (1/2)	Race not held
2012	Lizzie Armitstead (GBR) (1/3)	Judith Arndt (GER) (2/2)	Race not held
2013	Kirsten Wild (NED) (1/2)	Marianne Vos (NED) (2/2)	Race not held
2014	Lauren Hall (USA)	Ellen van Dijk (NED)	Race not held
2015	Floortje Mackaij (NED)	Elisa Longo Borghini (ITA) (1/3)	Race not held
2016	Chantal Blaak (NED) (1/2)	Lizzie Armitstead (GBR) (2/3)	Race not held
2017	Lotta Lepistö (FIN)	Coryn Rivera (USA)	Race not held
2018	Marta Bastianelli (ITA) (1/2)	Anna van der Breggen (NED)	Race not held
2019	Kirsten Wild (NED) (2/2)	Marta Bastianelli (ITA) (2/2)	Race not held
2020	Jolien D'Hoore (BEL)	Chantal van den Broek-Blaak (NED) (2/2)	Cancelled due to COVID-19 pandemic
2021	Marianne Vos (NED) (2/2)	Annemiek van Vleuten (NED) (2/2)	Lizzie Deignan (GBR) (3/3)
2022	Elisa Balsamo (ITA)	Lotte Kopecky (BEL) (1/4)	Elisa Longo Borghini (ITA) (2/3)
2023	Marlen Reusser (SUI)	Lotte Kopecky (BEL) (2/4)	Alison Jackson (CAN)
2024	Lorena Wiebes (NED) (1/3)	Elisa Longo Borghini (ITA) (3/3)	Lotte Kopecky (BEL) (3/4)
2025	Lorena Wiebes (NED) (2/3)	Lotte Kopecky (BEL) (4/4)	Pauline Ferrand-Prévot (FRA)
2026	Lorena Wiebes (NED) (3/3)	Demi Vollering (NED)	Franziska Koch (GER)
Year	Gent–Wevelgem (BEL)	Tour of Flanders for Women (BEL)	Paris–Roubaix Femmes (FRA)

== Statistics ==
- Active cyclists marked in **bold**.

=== Most cobbled classics wins per male rider ===
Rank	Name	Total wins	E3 Harelbeke	Gent–Wevelgem	Tour of Flanders	Paris–Roubaix
1	Tom Boonen (BEL)	15	5 (2004, 2005, 2006, 2007, 2012)	3 (2004, 2011, 2012)	3 (2005, 2006, 2012)	4 (2005, 2008, 2009, 2012)
2	Rik Van Looy (BEL)	12	4 (1964, 1965, 1966, 1969)	3 (1956, 1957, 1962)	2 (1959, 1962)	3 (1961, 1962, 1965)
3	Fabian Cancellara (SUI)	9	3 (2010, 2011, 2013)	0	3 (2010, 2013, 2014)	3 (2006, 2010, 2013)
3	**Mathieu van der Poel** (NED)	9	3 (2024, 2025, 2026)	0	3 (2020, 2022, 2024)	3 (2023, 2024, 2025)
5	Eddy Merckx (BEL)	8	0	3 (1967, (1970, (1973)	2 (1969, 1975)	3 (1968, 1970, 1973)
5	Johan Museeuw (BEL)	8	2 (1992, 1998)	0	3 (1993, 1995, 1998)	3 (1996, 2000, 2002)

=== Most cobbled classics wins per women rider ===
Rank	Name	Total wins	Gent–Wevelgem	Tour of Flanders	Paris–Roubaix
1	**Lotte Kopecky** (BEL)	4	0	3 (2022, 2023, 2025)	1 (2024)
2	**Lizzie Deignan** (GBR)	3	1 (2012)	1 (2016)	1 (2021)
2	**Elisa Longo Borghini** (ITA)	3	0	2 (2015, 2024)	1 (2022)
2	**Lorena Wiebes** (NED)	3	3 (2024, 2025, 2026)	0	0

== See also ==
- Ardennes classics
- Classic cycle races
