= Circuit de la Vallée de la Senne =

Men's cycling race (1962–1976)

Omloop der Zennevallei
Race details
- Date: August 15
- Region: Flemish Brabant, Belgium
- English name: Tour of the Zenne Valley
- Local name(s): Omloop der Zennevallei (in Dutch), Circuit de la Vallée de la Senne (in French)
- Discipline: Road
- Type: One-day race

History
- First edition: 1962
- Editions: 15
- Final edition: 1976
- First winner: Clément Roman (FRA)
- Most wins: Victor Van Schil (BEL); (2 wins)
- Final winner: Ludo Peeters (BEL)

The Tour of the Zenne Valley (Dutch: Omloop der Zennevallei) was a men's road cycling road race that took place annually from 1962 to 1976 around Dworp, in Belgian Flemish Brabant.

The competition's roll of honor includes the successes of Rik Van Looy and Eddy Merckx.

== Winners ==
Year	Winner	Second	Third
1962	(Belgium) Clément Roman	(Belgium) Roger Baens	(Belgium) Marcel Seynaeve
1963	(Belgium) Bernard Van de Kerckhove	(United Kingdom) Michael Wright	(Belgium) Willy Bocklant
1964	(Belgium) Emile Daems	(Belgium) Emiel Verheyden	(Belgium) Willy Van Den Eynde
1965	(Belgium) Martin Van Den Bossche	(Belgium) Jan Nolmans	(Belgium) Willy Van Den Eynde
1966	(Belgium) Willy Van Den Eynde	(Belgium) Georges Delvael	(Belgium) André Chainniaux
1967	(Belgium) Eddy Merckx	(Belgium) Alfons De Bal	(Belgium) Willy Donie
1968	(Belgium) Victor Van Schil	(Belgium) Eddy Merckx	(Belgium) André Gosselin
1969	(Belgium) Rik Van Looy	(Belgium) Roger De Vlaeminck	(Belgium) Erik De Vlaeminck
1970	(Belgium) Joseph Deschoenmaecker	(Belgium) Raphaël Hooyberghs	(Belgium) André Poppe
1971	(Belgium) Maurice Dury	(Belgium) Rik Van Linden	(Belgium) Frans Verbeeck
1972	(Belgium) Georges Pintens	(Belgium) Paul Aerts	(Belgium) Jean-Pierre Berckmans
1973	(Belgium) Jean-Pierre Berckmans	(Belgium) Roger De Vlaeminck	(Belgium) Gérard Hendrickx
1974	(Belgium) Alfons De Bal	(Belgium) André Dierickx	(Belgium) Jean-Pierre Berckmans
1975	(Belgium) Victor Van Schil	(Belgium) Eddy Verstraeten	(Netherlands) Gerben Karstens
1976	(Belgium) Ludo Peeters	(Belgium) Victor Van Schil	(Belgium) Willy In't Ven
