= 1967 Brabantse Pijl =

Race details
- Dates: 27 March 1967
- Stages: 1
- Distance: 196 km (121.8 mi)
- Winning time: 5h 16' 00"

Results
	Winner	Roger Rosiers (BEL)
	Second	Jan Lauwers (BEL)
	Third	Emiel Coppens (BEL)

The 1967 Brabantse Pijl was the seventh edition of the Brabantse Pijl cycle race and was held on 27 March 1967. The race started and finished in Sint-Genesius-Rode. The race was won by Roger Rosiers.

== General classification ==
Final general classification

Rank	Rider	Time
1	Roger Rosiers (BEL)	5h 16' 00"
2	Jan Lauwers (BEL)	+ 1' 10"
3	Emiel Coppens (BEL)	+ 2' 45"
4	Bruno Janssens (BEL)	+ 2' 45"
5	Robert Lelangue (BEL)	+ 3' 40"
6	Flaviano Vicentini (ITA)	+ 4' 00"
7	Jan Nolmans (BEL)	+ 4' 00"
8	Frans Brands (BEL)	+ 4' 00"
9	Willy Monty (BEL)	+ 5' 15"
10	Jean Monteyne (BEL)	+ 9' 27"
