= E3 Saxo Classic =

Belgian one-day road cycling race

Race details
- Date: Late March
- Region: Flanders, Belgium
- Local name: E3 Harelbeke (in Dutch)
- Nickname: The little Tour of Flanders
- Discipline: Road
- Competition: UCI World Tour
- Type: One-day race
- Organiser: Hand in Hand VZW
- Race director: Philippe Vermeeren
- Web site: www.e3saxoclassic.be

History
- First edition: 1958
- Editions: 68 (as of 2026)
- First winner: Armand Desmet (BEL)
- Most wins: Tom Boonen (BEL) (5 wins)
- Most recent: Mathieu van der Poel (NED)

E3 Saxo Classic, previously known as Harelbeke–Antwerp–Harelbeke, E3 Prijs Vlaanderen, E3 Harelbeke, E3 Binckbank Classic and E3 Saxo Bank Classic, is an annual road cycling race in Flanders, Belgium. The race starts and finishes in Harelbeke mainly in the Flemish Ardennes.

First raced in 1958, it is one of the more recently founded one-day classics, but has developed into a prestigious and desirable event. It is on the UCI World Tour calendar, as part of a series of cobbled classics in Belgium and Northern France in March and April.

Belgian Tom Boonen holds the record for number of victories with five wins, trailed by cycling icon Rik Van Looy who won four times.

== Cobbled Classic ==
E3 Harelbeke is held on the last Friday of March and marks the start of the Flemish Cycling Week, starting a fortnight of WorldTour racing on the cobbles and bergs of Flanders. It is the second in the series of cobbled races in Belgium and northern France that take place over a two-week period from the Wednesday after Milan–San Remo until Paris–Roubaix. E3 Harelbeke is the race that resembles the Tour of Flanders the most.

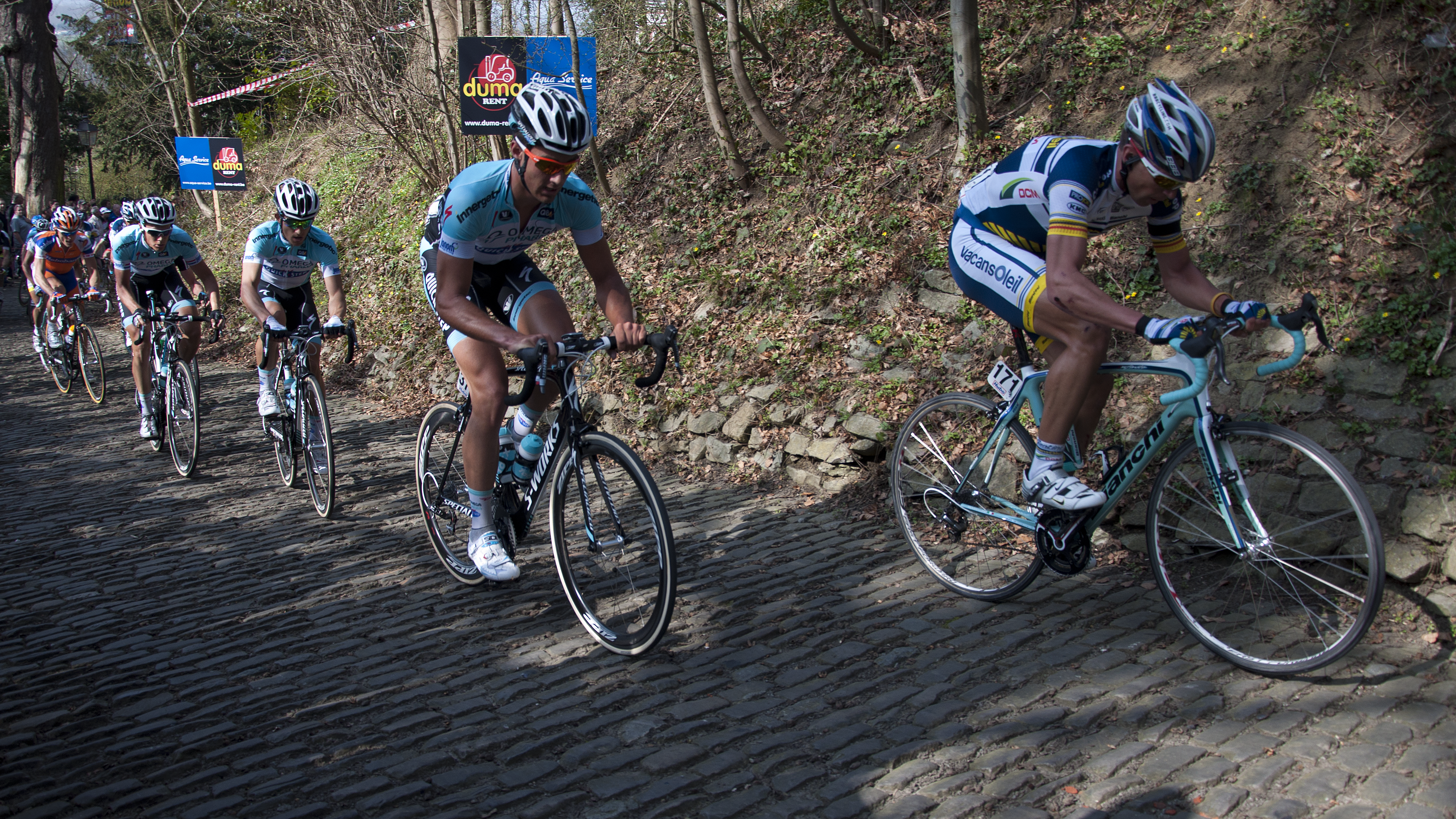
Stijn Devolder and Guillaume Van Keirsbulck climbing the Muur van Geraardsbergen in the 2012 race.

In 2010, UCI made some calendar changes, most notably positioning the Pro Tour race Gent–Wevelgem on the day after E3 Harelbeke, causing a dispute between the two races. In 2012, when the E3 race was upgraded to World Tour status as well, organizers changed the date of their event to Friday to meet the demands of UCI, who requested a day of rest between two arduous World Tour events.

Because of its place on the calendar, the race has built a reputation as the final rehearsal for the more prestigious Tour of Flanders, the Flemish monument race coming nine days after the E3 Harelbeke. With a distance of 200–215 km, the E3 route is shorter than the Tour of Flanders, but addresses many of the same roads and hills of the Flemish Ardennes. With cobbles, steep climbs, winding and narrow roads, and often affected by wind, it offers all race circumstances that characterize Flemish classic races. Favourites for the Tour of Flanders often do well in Harelbeke, eager to win the race and using it as the perfect testing ground. Because of the similarities, Flemish media have dubbed the race The little Tour of Flanders.

== History ==
The E3 Harelbeke was created in 1958. The first editions were raced from Harelbeke to Antwerp and back, hence the event was named Harelbeke-Antwerp-Harelbeke. Belgian cycling icon Rik Van Looy won the race four times in the 1960s. E3 does not refer to a race sponsor; the race was renamed E3-Prijs Harelbeke in the early 1960s, as a reference to the former European route E03, a series of European highways from Lisbon to Stockholm. The Belgian part of the E3 – now called E17 – connected Antwerp and Kortrijk, close to Harelbeke.

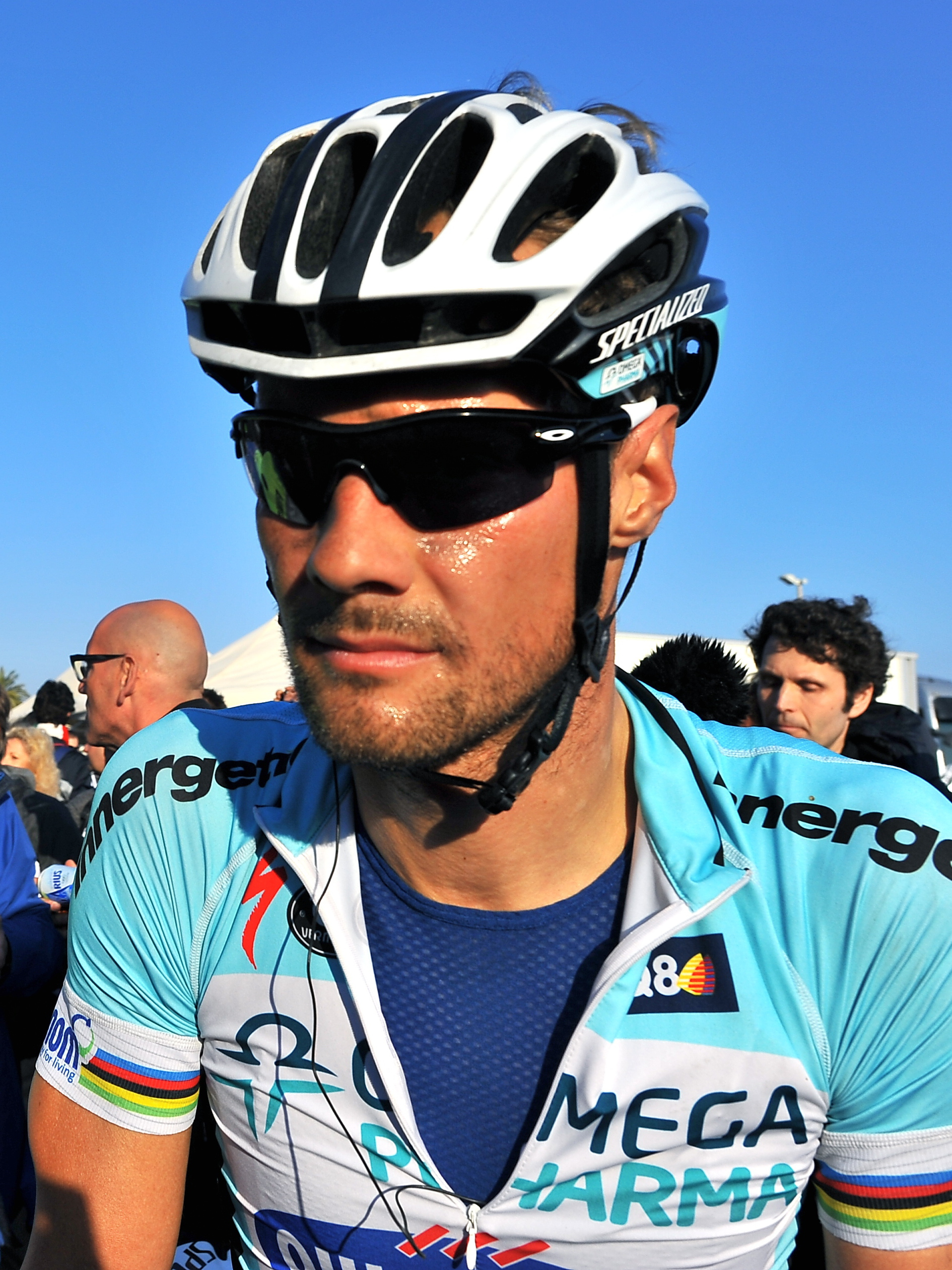
Tom Boonen won a record five times

Although the race is much younger than many other cycling classics in Flanders, it quickly became a desirable entry for specialists of the cobbled races. Many winners on the roll of honour have also won the Tour of Flanders or Paris–Roubaix in their careers. Classics specialist Jan Raas won the race three consecutive times in the early 1980s. In the 1990s Johan Museeuw and Andrei Tchmil won their first important one-day races in Harelbeke, before winning cycling's most prestigious cobbled classics.

Since the first edition until 2011, the race was held on a Saturday in the weekend before the Tour of Flanders, forming a tandem with the Brabantse Pijl on Sunday. From 2005 until 2011 the race was part of the continental UCI Europe Tour, where it was classified as a 1.HC race. Belgian Tom Boonen, claiming four consecutive wins, and Swiss Fabian Cancellara were the main protagonists with some spectacular victories, and the event garnered a lot of prestige on the international calendar.

In 2012 the race was upgraded to World Tour level, cycling's highest level of professional races. Tom Boonen won the edition, setting a record of five victories, and the race was officially named E3 Harelbeke. In 2013 Fabian Cancellara claimed his third win after a long-distance attack on the Oude Kwaremont and a 35 km solo raid to the finish. The race has a reputation as a foremost cobbled classic. The race was rebranded E3 BinckBank Classic for the 2019 edition, following a sponsorship deal. The name change does not have consequences for the route, as the city of Harelbeke continues to host the start and finish of the race.

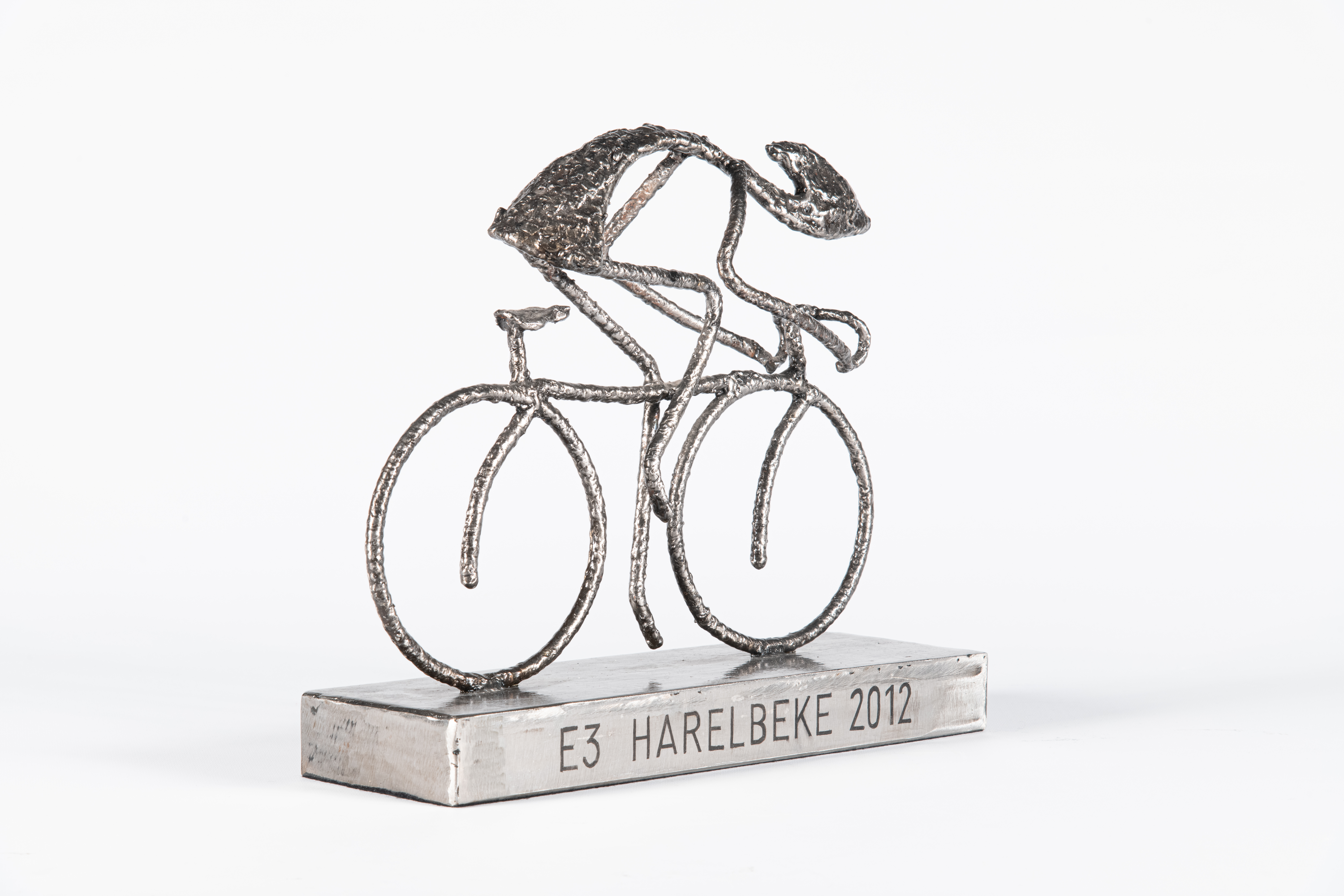
Trophy won by Tom Boonen at 2012 E3 Harelbeke (collection KOERS. Museum of Cycle Racing)

It was raced without interruption from its inception until the COVID-19 pandemic caused the cancellation of the 2020 edition.

A women's edition of the race was first held in 2022 as Leiedal Koerse, alongside a junior men's race rather than the WorldTour race. However, the organisers cancelled the 2024 edition for financial reasons.

== Route ==
Usually a little over 200 kilometres long and always starting and finishing in Harelbeke, the E3 Harelbeke contains anything between 12 and 17 short, sharp, cobbled climbs, mainly in the last 90 kilometres. As usual in Flemish one-day racing, local knowledge can be crucial.

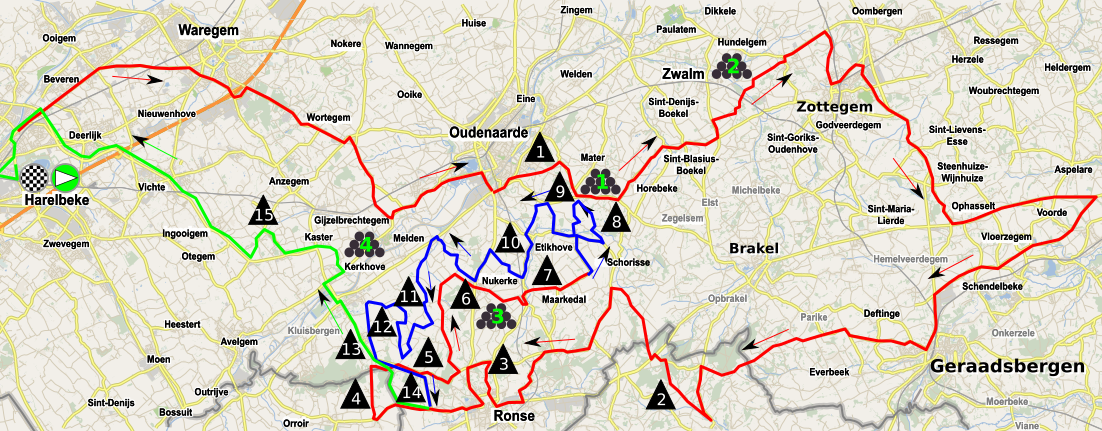
Route of the 2018 edition

The race starts on Harelbeke's Grote Markt and travels east on mainly flat roads towards Oudenaarde and Zottegem. The riders reach the most easterly point in Ninove after 85 km, before returning west via Geraardsbergen, after which the race addresses the bergs and cobbled roads of the Flemish Ardennes in the south of East Flanders. The race unfolds in the hill zone with a succession of short, sharp climbs as the course loops between Ronse and Oudenaarde.

The last climbs in the Flemish Ardennes – Paterberg, Oude Kwaremont and Karnemelkbeekstraat – are notoriously difficult and the sites where the race tends to split apart for good; before the race re-enters West Flanders for a mainly flat run-in to the finish. The Tiegemberg, the last climb of the day, comes at 20 kilometres from the finish in Harelbeke.

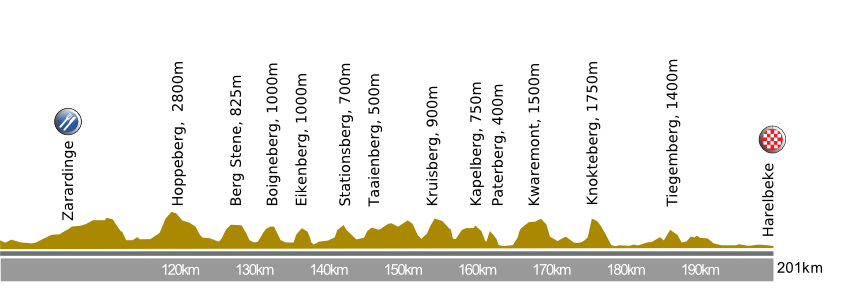
Profile of the 2012 edition

=== Hills and cobbles ===
In 2017 there were 15 categorized hills. The climbs, in order of appearance, are Katteberg, La Houppe, Kruisberg, Côte de Trieu, Hotond, Kortekeer, Taaienberg, Boigneberg, Eikenberg, Stationsberg, Kapelberg, Paterberg, Oude Kwaremont, Karnemelkbeekstraat and Tiegemberg. The Paterberg is a cobbled 300m climb that averages 12.5%, while the Oude Kwaremont is 2200m, of which 1500m cobbled, with a gradient average of 4.2%. In addition to the climbs, there are four flat stretches of cobbled roads.

== Winners ==
Year	Country	Rider	Team
↓ Harelbeke–Antwerp–Harelbeke ↓
1958	Belgium	Armand Desmet	Groene Leeuw–Leopold
1959	Belgium	Norbert Kerckhove	Faema–Guerra
1960	Belgium	Daniel Doom	Wiel's–Flandria
1961	Belgium	Arthur De Cabooter	Groene Leeuw–SAS–Sinalco
1962	Belgium	André Messelis	Wiel's–Groene Leeuw
1963	Belgium	Noël Foré	Faema–Flandria
1964	Belgium	Rik Van Looy	Solo–Superia
1965	Belgium	Rik Van Looy	Solo–Superia
1966	Belgium	Rik Van Looy	Solo–Superia
1967	Belgium	Willy Bocklant	Flandria–De Clerck
1968	Belgium	Jaak De Boever	Smiths
1969	Belgium	Rik Van Looy	Willem II–Gazelle
↓ E3 Prijs Vlaanderen ↓
1970	Belgium	Daniel Van Ryckeghem	Mann–Grundig
1971	Belgium	Roger De Vlaeminck	Flandria–Mars
1972	Belgium	Hubert Hutsebaut	Goldor–IJsboerke
1973	Belgium	Willy In 't Ven	Molteni
1974	Belgium	Herman Van Springel	MIC–Ludo–De Gribaldy
1975	Belgium	Frans Verbeeck	Maes Pils–Watney
1976	Belgium	Walter Planckaert	Maes Pils–Rokado
1977	West Germany	Dietrich Thurau	TI–Raleigh
1978	Belgium	Freddy Maertens	Flandria–Velda–Lano
1979	Netherlands	Jan Raas	TI–Raleigh
1980	Netherlands	Jan Raas	TI–Raleigh
1981	Netherlands	Jan Raas	TI–Raleigh
1982	Belgium	Jan Bogaert	Europ Decor
1983	Belgium	William Tackaert	Splendor–Euroshop
1984	Netherlands	Bert Oosterbosch	Panasonic–Raleigh
1985	Australia	Phil Anderson	Panasonic–Raleigh
1986	Belgium	Eric Vanderaerden	Panasonic–Merckx–Agu
1987	Belgium	Eddy Planckaert	Panasonic–Isostar
1988	Italy	Guido Bontempi	Carrera Jeans–Vagabond
1989	Belgium	Eddy Planckaert	ADR-Coors Light
1990	Denmark	Søren Lilholt	Histor–Sigma
1991	Germany	Olaf Ludwig	Panasonic–Sportlife
1992	Belgium	Johan Museeuw	Lotto–Mavic–MBK
1993	Italy	Mario Cipollini	GB–MG Maglificio
1994	Moldova	Andrei Tchmil	Lotto
1995	Belgium	Bart Leysen	Mapei–GB–Latexco
1996	Belgium	Carlo Bomans	Mapei–GB
1997	Belgium	Hendrik Van Dijck	TVM–Farm Frites
1998	Belgium	Johan Museeuw	Mapei–Bricobi
1999	Belgium	Peter Van Petegem	TVM–Farm Frites
2000	Russia	Sergei Ivanov	Farm Frites
2001	Belgium	Andrei Tchmil	Lotto–Adecco
2002	Italy	Dario Pieri	Alessio
2003	Netherlands	Steven de Jongh	Rabobank
2004	Belgium	Tom Boonen	Quick-Step–Davitamon
2005	Belgium	Tom Boonen	Quick-Step–Innergetic
2006	Belgium	Tom Boonen	Quick-Step–Innergetic
2007	Belgium	Tom Boonen	Quick-Step–Innergetic
2008	Norway	Kurt Asle Arvesen	Team CSC
2009	Italy	Filippo Pozzato	Team Katusha
2010	Switzerland	Fabian Cancellara	Team Saxo Bank
2011	Switzerland	Fabian Cancellara	Leopard Trek
↓ E3 Harelbeke ↓
2012	Belgium	Tom Boonen	Omega Pharma–Quick-Step
2013	Switzerland	Fabian Cancellara	RadioShack–Leopard
2014	Slovakia	Peter Sagan	Cannondale
2015	Great Britain	Geraint Thomas	Team Sky
2016	Poland	Michał Kwiatkowski	Team Sky
2017	Belgium	Greg Van Avermaet	BMC Racing Team
2018	Netherlands	Niki Terpstra	Quick-Step Floors
↓ E3 Binckbank Classic ↓
2019	Czech Republic	Zdeněk Štybar	Deceuninck–Quick-Step
2020	No race due to COVID-19 pandemic		
↓ E3 Saxo Bank Classic ↓
2021	Denmark	Kasper Asgreen	Deceuninck–Quick-Step
2022	Belgium	Wout van Aert	Team Jumbo–Visma
↓ E3 Saxo Classic ↓
2023	Belgium	Wout van Aert	Team Jumbo–Visma
2024	Netherlands	Mathieu van der Poel	Alpecin–Deceuninck
2025	Netherlands	Mathieu van der Poel	Alpecin–Deceuninck
2026	Netherlands	Mathieu van der Poel	Alpecin–Premier Tech

=== Multiple winners ===
Riders in italics are still active.

Wins	Rider	Editions
5	Tom Boonen (BEL)	2004, 2005, 2006, 2007, 2012
4	Rik Van Looy (BEL)	1964, 1965, 1966, 1969
3	Jan Raas (NED)	1979, 1980, 1981
3	Fabian Cancellara (SUI)	2010, 2011, 2013
3	Mathieu van der Poel (NED)	2024, 2025, 2026
2	Eddy Planckaert (BEL)	1987, 1989
2	Johan Museeuw (BEL)	1992, 1998
2	Andrei Tchmil (BEL)	1994, 2001
2	Wout van Aert (BEL)	2022, 2023

=== Wins per country ===
Wins	Country
40	Belgium
9	Netherlands
4	Italy
3	Switzerland
2	Denmark; Germany
1	Australia; Czech Republic; Great Britain; Moldova; Norway; Poland; Russia; Slovakia

== Criticism ==
The race organisers have been criticised in the media for sexism and homophobia. The 2009 and 2011 publicity posters for the event both featured a naked woman riding a bike.

In 2015 a publicity poster for the race caused severe controversy. The poster showed a woman's bare legs from behind, with a cyclist's gloved hand apparently going to pinch the woman's bottom. It was a reference to Peter Sagan's actions after the 2013 Tour of Flanders, when he pinched a podium miss' bottom during the after-race ceremony. The poster was considered "demeaning" and "misogynistic" and was criticized by the Belgian Jury of Advertising Ethics, forcing UCI to issue a statement disapproving the promotional poster and ordering the organisers to withdraw and replace it.

In 2019 organisers were again forced to withdraw a controversial poster. The poster showed two bodypainted women entwined to form the figure of a frog, accompanied by the tagline: "Who shall crown himself prince in Harelbeke?". E3 organisers were roundly criticised again, forcing them to remove the graphics from all of its media. In 2024, organisers tweeted out a homophobic cartoon featuring Wout van Aert, before deleting the cartoon and apologising following criticism in the media.

== Statistics and trivia ==
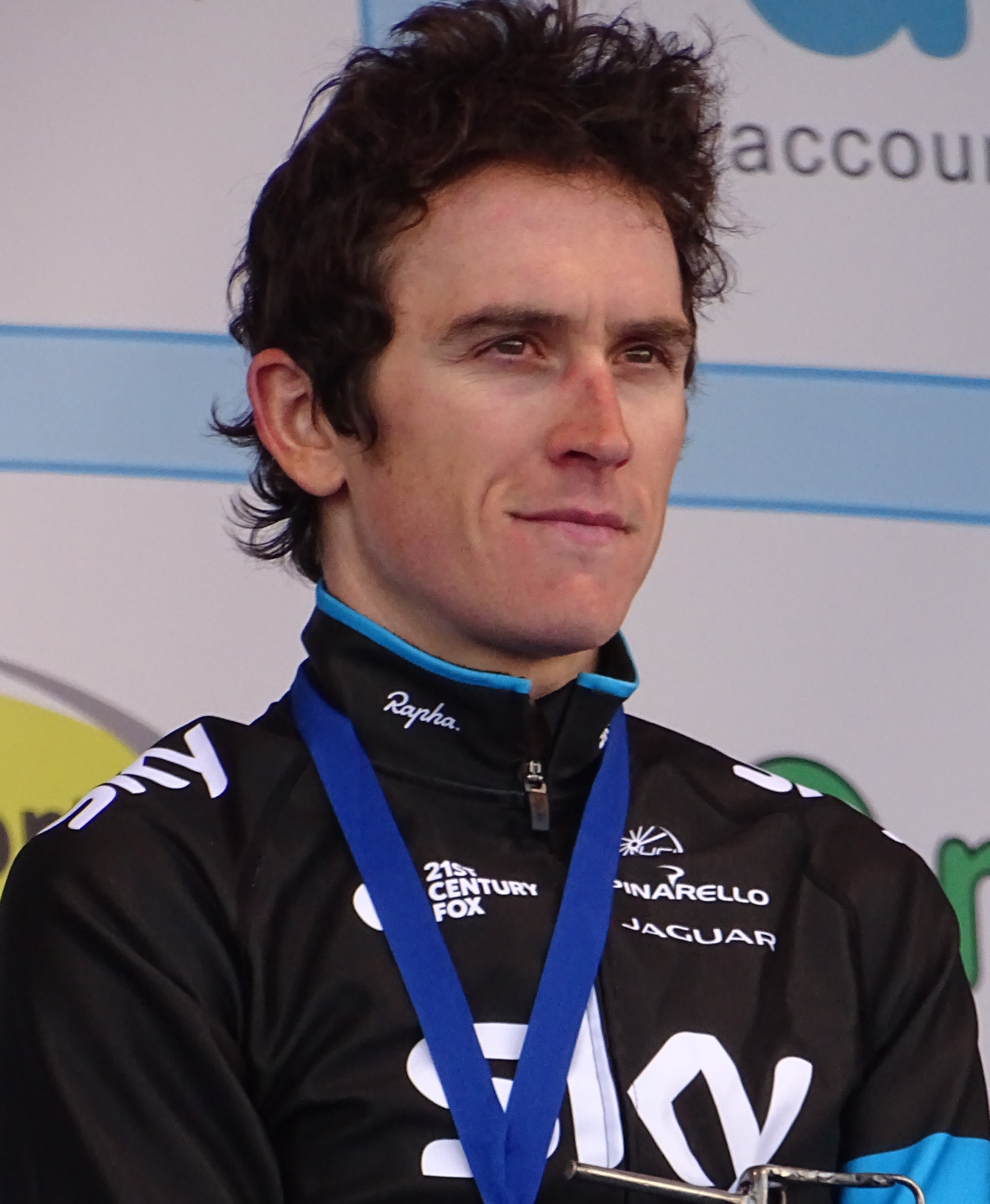
Welsh rider Geraint Thomas won the 2015 event and became the first winner who also won the Tour de France, following his 2018 Tour de France win.

- E3 Harelbeke is the only Flemish one-day cycling event at World Tour level that is not owned and organized by Flanders Classics.
- The fastest edition was the 2003 event, won by Dutchman Steven de Jongh in an average speed of 45.9 km/h.
- 17 riders on the roll of honour, have also won the Tour of Flanders during their careers. In chronological order: Arthur Decabooter, Noël Foré, Rik Van Looy, Roger De Vlaeminck, Walter Planckaert, Jan Raas, Eric Vanderaerden, Eddy Planckaert, Johan Museeuw, Andrei Tchmil, Peter Van Petegem, Tom Boonen, Fabian Cancellara, Peter Sagan, Niki Terpstra, Kasper Asgreen and Mathieu van der Poel. All of them, except Van Looy and Van der Poel, have won E3 Harelbeke before their first or only Tour of Flanders win.
- 10 riders won E3 Harelbeke and the Tour of Flanders in the same year: Noël Foré in 1963, Walter Planckaert in 1976, Jan Raas in 1979, Johan Museeuw in 1998, Peter Van Petegem in 1999, Tom Boonen in 2005, 2006 and 2012, Fabian Cancellara in 2010 and 2013, Niki Terpstra in 2018, Kasper Asgreen in 2021 and Mathieu van der Poel in 2024.
- In 2012 the famed Muur van Geraardsbergen was included in the E3 Harelbeke for the first time. It was organizers' whimsical response to Flanders Classics' decision to exclude the climb from the Tour of Flanders, an action that caused great upheaval among Flanders' tradition-loving cycling aficionado's.
- 9 winners of E3 Harelbeke have also won the world title: Rik Van Looy, Freddy Maertens, Jan Raas, Mario Cipollini, Johan Museeuw, Tom Boonen, Peter Sagan, Michał Kwiatkowski and Mathieu van der Poel. Three of them won the race in the rainbow jersey as ruling world champions: Jan Raas in 1980, Tom Boonen in 2006 and Mathieu van der Poel in 2024.
- Geraint Thomas, winner of the 2015 event, became the first Tour de France winner on the roll of honour, following his overall victory at the 2018 Tour de France. Five-fold Tour de France winner Eddy Merckx finished third in the 1971 race and second in 1972, but failed to win the event.
