= 1979 E3 Prijs Vlaanderen =

1979 E3 Harelbeke
Race details
- Dates: 24 March 1979
- Stages: 1
- Distance: 226 km (140 mi)
- Winning time: 5h 48' 00"

Results
	Winner	Jan Raas (NED)	(TI–Raleigh–McGregor)
	Second	Frank Hoste (BEL)	(Marc Zeep Savon–Superia)
	Third	Michel Pollentier (BEL)	(Splendor–Euro Soap)

The 1979 E3 Harelbeke was the 22nd edition of the E3 Harelbeke cycle race and was held on 24 March 1979. The race started and finished in Harelbeke. The race was won by Jan Raas of the TI–Raleigh team.

== General classification ==
Final general classification

Rank	Rider	Team	Time
1	Jan Raas (NED)	TI–Raleigh–McGregor	5h 48' 00"
2	Frank Hoste (BEL)	Marc Zeep Savon–Superia	+ 2"
3	Michel Pollentier (BEL)	Splendor–Euro Soap	+ 2"
4	Dietrich Thurau (FRG)	IJsboerke–Warncke Eis	+ 1' 57"
5	Henk Lubberding (NED)	TI–Raleigh–McGregor	+ 1' 57"
6	Marc Renier (BEL)	Kas–Campagnolo	+ 4' 13"
7	Jan Aling (NED)	Marc Zeep Savon–Superia	+ 4' 13"
8	Léo Van Thielen (BEL)	Safir–Geuze–Saint-Louis–Ludo	+ 4' 18"
9	Eddy Cael (BEL)	Splendor–Euro Soap	+ 4' 18"
10	Dirk Baert (BEL)	Carlos–Galli–G.B.C.–Castelli	+ 5' 23"
