= 1969 Harelbeke–Antwerp–Harelbeke =

Race details
- Dates: 22 March 1969
- Stages: 1
- Distance: 215 km (134 mi)
- Winning time: 5h 23' 00"

Results
	Winner	Rik Van Looy (BEL)	(Willem II–Gazelle)
	Second	Georges Van Coningsloo (BEL)	(Peugeot–BP–Michelin)
	Third	Willy Vekemans (BEL)	(Goldor–Hertekamp–Gerka)

The 1969 Harelbeke–Antwerp–Harelbeke (Note: The race was known as Harelbeke–Antwerp–Harelbeke (French: Harelbeke–Anvers–Harelbeke) for the first twelve editions. In 1970, the race became known as the E3, after the Belgian road which is now known as the E17.) was the 12th edition of the E3 Harelbeke cycle race and was held on 22 March 1969. The race started and finished in Harelbeke. The race was won by Rik Van Looy of the Willem II–Gazelle team.

== General classification ==
Final general classification

Rank	Rider	Team	Time
1	Rik Van Looy (BEL)	Willem II–Gazelle	5h 23' 00"
2	Georges Van Coningsloo (BEL)	Peugeot–BP–Michelin	+ 25"
3	Willy Vekemans (BEL)	Goldor–Hertekamp–Gerka	+ 25"
4	Willy Monty (BEL)	Peugeot–BP–Michelin	+ 25"
5	Willy In 't Ven (BEL)	Dr. Mann–Grundig	+ 25"
6	Jos van der Vleuten (NED)	Willem II–Gazelle	+ 25"
7	Eddy Merckx (BEL)	Faema	+ 3' 45"
8	Herman Van Springel (BEL)	Dr. Mann–Grundig	+ 3' 45"
9	Barry Hoban (GBR)	Mercier–BP–Hutchinson	+ 3' 45"
10	André Dierickx (BEL)	Peugeot–BP–Michelin	+ 3' 45"
