= 1969 Paris–Tours =

Race details
- Dates: 29 September 1969
- Stages: 1
- Distance: 286 km (177.7 mi)
- Winning time: 6h 38' 43"

Results
	Winner	Herman Van Springel (BEL)
	Second	Frans Verbeeck (BEL)
	Third	Roger Jochmans (BEL)

The 1969 Paris–Tours was the 63rd edition of the Paris–Tours cycle race and was held on 29 September 1969. The race started in Paris and finished in Tours. The race was won by Herman Van Springel.

== General classification ==
Final general classification

Rank	Rider	Time
1	Herman Van Springel (BEL)	6h 38' 43"
2	Frans Verbeeck (BEL)	+ 28"
3	Roger Jochmans (BEL)	+ 28"
4	Georges Claes Jr. (BEL)	+ 28"
5	Fernand Hermie (BEL)	+ 28"
6	Evert Dolman (NED)	+ 28"
7	Georges Van Coningsloo (BEL)	+ 28"
8	Etienne Buysse (BEL)	+ 28"
9	Ronald De Witte (BEL)	+ 28"
10	Willy De Geest (BEL)	+ 28"
