= Goldor (cycling team) =

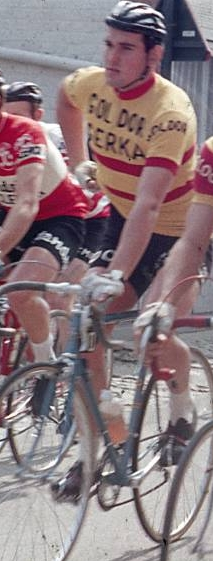
- Willy Vekemans wearing the team's jersey in 1967

Team information
- Registered: Belgium
- Founded: 1965
- Disbanded: 1973
- Discipline: Road

Key personnel
- Team managers: Florent Vanvaerenbergh; Firmin Verhelst; Edgard De Maere

Team name history
- 1965 1966 1967 1968 1969 1970 1971 1972 1973: Goldor–Breda; Goldor–Main d'Or; Goldor–Gerka; Goldor–Gerka–Main d'Or; Goldor–Hertekamp–Gerka; Goldor–Fryns–Elvé; Goldor; Goldor–Ijsboerke; Goldor–Hercka
Goldor jersey
Jersey

Goldor was a Belgian professional cycling team that existed from 1965 to 1973. The team underwent name changes for every year of its existence. The team competed in four editions of the Vuelta a España, taking two stage wins in both the 1969 and 1971 editions. Other notable victories include the 1967 Omloop Het Volk and 1969 Gent–Wevelgem by Willy Vekemans and the 1972 E3 Prijs Vlaanderen by Hubert Hutsebaut.

After folding in 1973, the squad was succeeded by the IJsboerke team, which formed the following year.
