= 1968 Giro di Lombardia =

Race details
- Dates: 12 October 1968
- Stages: 1
- Distance: 266 km (165.3 mi)
- Winning time: 6h 58' 58"

Results
	Winner	Herman Van Springel (BEL)	(Dr. Mann–Grundig)
	Second	Franco Bitossi (ITA)	(Filotex)
	Third	Eddy Merckx (BEL)	(Faema)

The 1968 Giro di Lombardia was the 62nd edition of the Giro di Lombardia cycle race and was held on 12 October 1968. The race started in Milan and finished in Como. The race was won by Herman Van Springel of the Dr. Mann team.

== General classification ==
Final general classification

Rank	Rider	Team	Time
1	Herman Van Springel (BEL)	Dr. Mann–Grundig	6h 58' 58"
2	Franco Bitossi (ITA)	Filotex	+ 15"
3	Eddy Merckx (BEL)	Faema	+ 15"
4	Jan Janssen (NED)	Pelforth–Sauvage–Lejeune	+ 53"
5	Martin Van Den Bossche (BEL)	Molteni	+ 1' 15"
6	Gianni Motta (ITA)	Molteni	+ 1' 50"
7	Felice Gimondi (ITA)	Salvarani	+ 1' 50"
8	Michele Dancelli (ITA)	Pepsi-Cola	+ 1' 50"
9	Jo de Roo (NED)	Willem II–Gazelle	+ 1' 50"
10	Adriano Durante (ITA)	Max Meyer	+ 1' 50"
