= Willy Vekemans =

Belgian cyclist (born 1945)

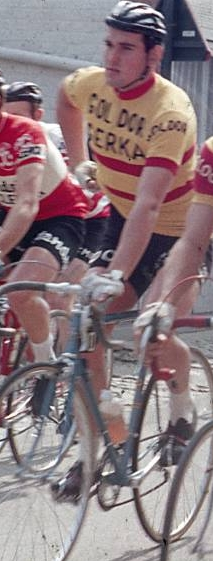
- Willy Vekemans in 1967

Personal information
- Born: 28 April 1945 (age 81) Putte, Belgium

Cycling career
- Sport: Cycling
- Discipline: Road
- Role: Rider

Professional teams
- 1967–1969: Goldor–Gerka
- 1970–1971: Hertekamp–Magniflex
- 1972: Rokado–Colders

Major wins
- One-day races and classics Omloop Het Volk (1967) Gent–Wevelgem (1969) GP du canton d'Argovie (1968)

Willy Vekemans (born 28 April 1945) is a Belgian former professional racing cyclist. He won the Omloop Het Volk in 1967 and Gent–Wevelgem in 1969.

== Major results ==
1967
1st Omloop Het Volk
1968
1st GP du canton d'Argovie
1st Stage 4 Tour of Belgium
2nd GP Stad Vilvoorde
7th Omloop Het Volk
1969
1st Gent–Wevelgem
1st Ronde van Limburg
1st Hoeilaart–Diest–Hoeilaart
1st Stage 4 Tour of Belgium
3rd Paris–Roubaix
3rd Harelbeke–Antwerp–Harelbeke
5th Amstel Gold Race
9th GP du canton d'Argovie
1970
1st Omloop van de Westhoek
1st Stage 2 Tirreno–Adriatico
4th Kuurne–Brussels–Kuurne
9th Overall Tour of Belgium
9th Omloop Het Volk
