= 1965 Harelbeke–Antwerp–Harelbeke =

Race details
- Dates: 27 March 1965
- Stages: 1
- Distance: 215 km (134 mi)
- Winning time: 5h 35' 00"

Results
	Winner	Rik Van Looy (BEL)	(Solo–Superia)
	Second	Georges Van Coningsloo (BEL)	(Peugeot–BP–Michelin)
	Third	René Thyssen (BEL)	(Cynar–Allegro)

The 1965 Harelbeke–Antwerp–Harelbeke (Note: The race was known as Harelbeke–Antwerp–Harelbeke (French: Harelbeke–Anvers–Harelbeke) for the first twelve editions. In 1970, the race became known as the E3, after the Belgian road which is now known as the E17.) was the 8th edition of the E3 Harelbeke cycle race and was held on 27 March 1965. The race started and finished in Harelbeke. The race was won by Rik Van Looy of the Solo–Superia team.

== General classification ==
Final general classification

Rank	Rider	Team	Time
1	Rik Van Looy (BEL)	Solo–Superia	5h 35' 00"
2	Georges Van Coningsloo (BEL)	Peugeot–BP–Michelin	+ 0"
3	René Thyssen (BEL)	Cynar–Allegro	+ 0"
4	André Messelis (BEL)	Dr. Mann	+ 0"
5	Tom Simpson (GBR)	Peugeot–BP–Michelin	+ 45"
6	Theo Verschueren (BEL)	Dr. Mann	+ 45"
7	Georges Vandenberghe (BEL)	Flandria–Romeo	+ 45"
8	Willy Van den Eynde (BEL)	Wiel's–Groene Leeuw	+ 45"
9	Willy Bocklant (BEL)	Flandria–Romeo	+ 45"
10	Jos Hoevenaers (BEL)	Cynar–Allegro	+ 45"
