= 1965 Brabantse Pijl =

Race details
- Dates: 31 March 1965
- Stages: 1
- Distance: 177 km (110.0 mi)
- Winning time: 4h 40' 00"

Results
	Winner	Willy Bocklant (BEL)
	Second	Georges Vanconingsloo (BEL)
	Third	Piet Rentmeester (NED)

The 1965 Brabantse Pijl was the fifth edition of the Brabantse Pijl cycle race and was held on 31 March 1965. The race started and finished in Brussels. The race was won by Willy Bocklant.

== General classification ==
Final general classification

Rank	Rider	Time
1	Willy Bocklant (BEL)	4h 40' 00"
2	Georges Van Coningsloo (BEL)	+ 34"
3	Piet Rentmeester (NED)	+ 34"
4	Robert Lelangue (BEL)	+ 34"
5	Victor Van Schil (BEL)	+ 34"
6	Jos van der Vleuten (NED)	+ 34"
7	Camiel Vyncke (BEL)	+ 34"
8	Alfons Hellemans (BEL)	+ 1' 45"
9	Jean-Baptiste Claes (BEL)	+ 1' 45"
10	Lionel Vandamme (BEL)	+ 1' 45"
