= 1963 Harelbeke–Antwerp–Harelbeke =

Race details
- Dates: 16 March 1963
- Stages: 1
- Distance: 201 km (125 mi)
- Winning time: 5h 14' 00"

Results
	Winner	Noël Foré (BEL)
	Second	Peter Post (NED)
	Third	Jef Planckaert (BEL)

The 1963 Harelbeke–Antwerp–Harelbeke (Note: The race was known as Harelbeke–Antwerp–Harelbeke (French: Harelbeke–Anvers–Harelbeke) for the first twelve editions. In 1970, the race became known as the E3, after the Belgian road which is now known as the E17.) was the sixth edition of the E3 Harelbeke cycle race and was held on 16 March 1963. The race started and finished in Harelbeke. The race was won by Noël Foré.

== General classification ==
Final general classification

Rank	Rider	Time
1	Noël Foré (BEL)	5h 14' 00"
2	Peter Post (NED)	+ 0"
3	Jef Planckaert (BEL)	+ 0"
4	Willy Bocklant (BEL)	+ 0"
5	Julien Gekiere (BEL)	+ 0"
6	Rene Thysen (BEL)	+ 20"
7	Lode Troonbeeckx (BEL)	+ 35"
8	Rik Luyten (BEL)	+ 35"
9	Gabriel Borra (BEL)	+ 35"
10	Georges Volckaert (BEL)	+ 35"
