= Alfons De Bal =

Belgian road cyclist (born 1943)

Personal information
- Born: 30 September 1943 (age 83) Geel, Belgium
- Height: 1.55 m (5 ft 1 in)

Cycling career
- Sport: Cycling
- Current team: Retired
- Discipline: Road
- Role: Rider

Professional teams
- 1963: G.B.C.–Gramaglia
- 1964–1966: Terrot–Leroux
- 1967–1969: Okay Whisky–Diamant–De Torrens
- 1970–1971: Geens–Watney
- 1972: Goldor–IJsboerke
- 1973: Hertekamp
- 1974: MIC–Ludo–de Gribaldy
- 1975: Maes Pils–Watney
- 1976–1979: IJsboerke–Colnago

Alfons De Bal (born 30 September 1943 in Geel) is a Belgian former road cyclist, who competed as a professional from 1963 to 1979. He most notably won the Druivenkoers Overijse in 1967.

== Major results ==
1966
2nd Circuit des Frontières
6th Druivenkoers Overijse
1967
1st Druivenkoers Overijse
2nd Omloop der Zennevallei
3rd De Kustpijl
3rd Grote 1-MeiPrijs
7th Kampioenschap van Vlaanderen
7th Tour du Condroz
1968
2nd Polder-Kempen
3rd Ronde van Limburg
9th Omloop Het Volk
1969
1st GP Stad Vilvoorde
3rd Road race, National Road Championships
5th Omloop van de Vlaamse Scheldeboorden
1970
4th Grote Prijs Jef Scherens
1971
4th Tour du Condroz
5th De Kustpijl
5th Nokere Koerse
5th Circuit des XI Villes
8th Grand Prix de Wallonie
1972
8th Grand Prix Cerami
1973
1st Omloop van het Leiedal
6th Le Samyn
1974
1st Omloop der Zennevallei
1975
6th Ronde van Limburg
1976
1st Omloop Schelde-Durme
4th Overall Tour de Luxembourg

1st Stages 3 & 4

7th Leeuwse Pijl
8th GP du Tournaisis
1977
1st Omloop van de Vlaamse Scheldeboorden
1st Stage 3 Tour de Luxembourg
1st Stages 2 & 4a Grand Prix du Midi Libre
3rd Milano–Torino
6th Ronde van Limburg
1978
1st Omloop van de Vlaamse Scheldeboorden
1st Stage 4 Étoile des Espoirs
3rd GP Union Dortmund
4th Overall Étoile de Bessèges
5th Le Samyn
5th Dwars door België
7th Grote Prijs Jef Scherens
9th Druivenkoers Overijse
1979
6th Omloop van de Vlaamse Scheldeboorden
