= Jan Lauwers =

Belgian cyclist (born 1938)

Personal information
- Born: 5 October 1938 (age 88) Zemst-Bos, Belgium

Cycling career
- Sport: Cycling
- Current team: Retired
- Discipline: Road
- Role: Rider

Professional teams
- 1962: Flandria–Faema–Clément
- 1963: G.B.C.–Gramaglia
- 1964–1965: Flandria–Faema
- 1966–1967: Roméo–Smith's

Jan Lauwers (born 5 October 1938) is a Belgian former road cyclist. Professional from 1962 to 1967, he notably won three stages of the Vuelta a España, Schaal Sels and the GP du canton d'Argovie.

== Major results ==
1962
1st Schaal Sels
1963
1st Stages 4 & 11 Vuelta a España
5th Druivenkoers-Overijse
5th Ronde van Brabant
1964
1st GP du canton d'Argovie
3rd Omloop van de Fruitstreek
4th Ronde van Brabant
1965
2nd GP Union Dortmund
5th GP Stad Vilvoorde
6th Ronde van Limburg
10th GP du canton d'Argovie
1966
1st GP Stad Vilvoorde
2nd GP Victor Standaert
2nd Omloop der Vlaamse Gewesten
6th Elfstedenronde
8th Druivenkoers-Overijse
8th Ronde van Brabant
1967
1st Stage 9 Vuelta a España
2nd Brabantse Pijl
2nd GP Stad Vilvoorde
10th Omloop Het Volk
