= 1966 Gent–Wevelgem =

Race details
- Dates: 23 March 1966
- Stages: 1
- Distance: 252 km (157 mi)
- Winning time: 6h 34' 00"

Results
	Winner	Herman Van Springel (BEL)	(Dr. Mann–Grundig)
	Second	Noël Van Clooster (BEL)	(Dr. Mann–Grundig)
	Third	Palle Lykke (DEN)	(Solo–Superia)

The 1966 Gent–Wevelgem was the 28th edition of the Belgian Gent–Wevelgem cycle race and was held on 23 March 1966. The race started in Ghent and finished in Wevelgem. The race was won by Herman Van Springel of the Dr. Mann team.

== General classification ==
Final general classification

Rank	Rider	Team	Time
1	Herman Van Springel (BEL)	Dr. Mann–Grundig	6h 34' 00"
2	Noël Van Clooster (BEL)	Dr. Mann–Grundig	+ 0"
3	Palle Lykke (DEN)	Solo–Superia	+ 50"
4	Arthur Decabooter (BEL)	Wiel's–Gancia-Groene Leeuw	+ 50"
5	Seamus Elliott (IRL)	Mercier–BP–Hutchinson	+ 1' 02"
6	Walter Godefroot (BEL)	Wiel's–Gancia-Groene Leeuw	+ 1' 02"
7	Jan Janssen (NED)	Pelforth–Sauvage–Lejeune	+ 1' 02"
8	Willy Bocklant (BEL)	Dr. Mann–Grundig	+ 1' 02"
9	Eddy Merckx (BEL)	Peugeot–BP–Michelin	+ 1' 02"
10	Bernard Van de Kerckhove (BEL)	Ford France–Hutchinson	+ 1' 02"
