= 1980 E3 Prijs Vlaanderen =

Race details
- Dates: 22 March 1980
- Stages: 1
- Distance: 226 km (140 mi)
- Winning time: 5h 17' 00"

Results
	Winner	Jan Raas (NED)	(TI–Raleigh–Creda)
	Second	Sean Kelly (IRL)	(Splendor–Admiral)
	Third	Rik Van Linden (BEL)	(DAF Trucks–Lejeune)

The 1980 E3 Prijs Vlaanderen was the 23rd edition of the E3 Prijs Vlaanderen cycle race and was held on 22 March 1980. The race started and finished in Harelbeke. The race was won by Jan Raas of the TI–Raleigh team.

== General classification ==
Final general classification

Rank	Rider	Team	Time
1	Jan Raas (NED)	TI–Raleigh–Creda	5h 17' 00"
2	Sean Kelly (IRL)	Splendor–Admiral	+ 0"
3	Rik Van Linden (BEL)	DAF Trucks–Lejeune	+ 0"
4	Benny Schepmans (BEL)	Safir–Ludo	+ 0"
5	Walter Planckaert (BEL)	Vermeer Thijs–Mini-Flat	+ 0"
6	Johan van der Meer (NED)	HB Alarmsystemen	+ 0"
7	Hennie Stamsnijder (NED)	DAF Trucks–Lejeune	+ 0"
8	Etienne De Wilde (BEL)	Splendor–Admiral	+ 0"
9	Frans Van Looy (BEL)	Vermeer Thijs–Mini-Flat	+ 0"
10	Rudy Pevenage (BEL)	IJsboerke–Warncke Eis	+ 0"
