= 1968 Omloop Het Volk =

Race details
- Dates: 2 March 1968
- Stages: 1
- Distance: 193 km (120 mi)
- Winning time: 4h 47' 30"

Results
	Winner	Herman Van Springel (BEL)
	Second	Rolf Wolfshohl (FRG)
	Third	Bernard Van de Kerckhove (BEL)

The 1968 Omloop Het Volk was the 23rd edition of the Omloop Het Volk cycle race and was held on 2 March 1968. The race started and finished in Ghent. The race was won by Herman Van Springel.

== General classification ==
Final general classification
Rank	Rider	Time
1	Herman Van Springel (BEL)	4h 47' 30"
2	Rolf Wolfshohl (FRG)	+ 4"
3	Bernard Van de Kerckhove (BEL)	+ 4"
4	Walter Godefroot (BEL)	+ 6"
5	Edward Sels (BEL)	+ 6"
6	Daniel Van Ryckeghem (BEL)	+ 6"
7	Willy Vekemans (BEL)	+ 6"
8	Walter Planckaert (BEL)	+ 6"
9	Alfons De Bal (BEL)	+ 6"
10	Willy Bocklant (BEL)	+ 6"
