= 1969 Gent–Wevelgem =

Race details
- Dates: 16 April 1969
- Stages: 1
- Distance: 250 km (160 mi)
- Winning time: 5h 46' 03"

Results
	Winner	Willy Vekemans (BEL)	(Goldor–Hertekamp–Gerka)
	Second	Roger De Vlaeminck (BEL)	(Flandria–De Clerck–Krüger)
	Third	Erik De Vlaeminck (BEL)	(Flandria–De Clerck–Krüger)

The 1969 Gent–Wevelgem was the 31st edition of the Belgian Gent–Wevelgem cycle race and was held on 16 April 1969. The race started in Ghent and finished in Wevelgem. The race was won by Willy Vekemans of the Goldor team.

== General classification ==
Final general classification

Rank	Rider	Team	Time
1	Willy Vekemans (BEL)	Goldor–Hertekamp–Gerka	5h 46' 03"
2	Roger De Vlaeminck (BEL)	Flandria–De Clerck–Krüger	+ 1"
3	Erik De Vlaeminck (BEL)	Flandria–De Clerck–Krüger	+ 1"
4	Eric Leman (BEL)	Flandria–De Clerck–Krüger	+ 1"
5	Antoine Houbrechts (BEL)	Flandria–De Clerck–Krüger	+ 1"
6	Valere Van Sweevelt (BEL)	Faema	+ 15"
7	Harm Ottenbros (NED)	Willem II–Gazelle	+ 15"
8	Daniel Van Ryckeghem (BEL)	Dr. Mann–Grundig	+ 15"
9	Patrick Sercu (BEL)	Faema	+ 15"
10	Rik Van Looy (BEL)	Willem II–Gazelle	+ 15"
