= Omloop van de Grensstreek (Ledegem) =

Belgian cycling race

Race details
- Date: March, May, June
- English name: Circuit of the border region
- Local name(s): Circuit des régions frontières (in French), Omloop van de grensstreek (in Dutch)
- Discipline: Road

History
- First edition: 1969
- Editions: 15
- Final edition: 1983
- First winner: Rik Van Looy (BEL)
- Final winner: Luc Colijn (BEL)

The Circuit of the Border Region was a men's cycling race organized for the last time in 1983. The start and finish place was Ledegem (West Flanders, Belgium)

The competition's roll of honor includes the successes of Rik Van Looy, Patrick Sercu and Roger De Vlaeminck.

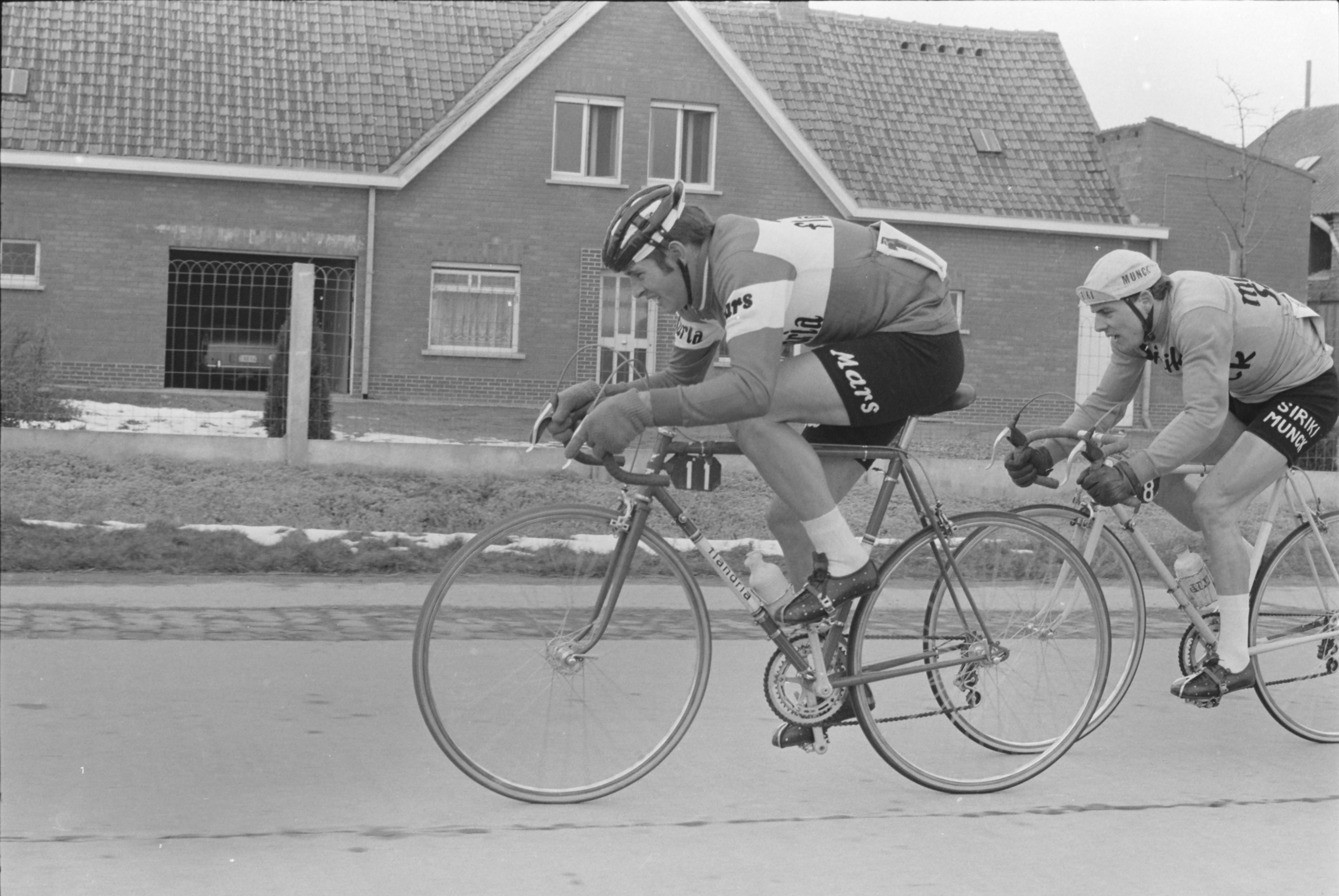
Jean-Pierre Monseré during the Omloop van de Grensstreek in Ledegem, 1970

== Winners ==
Year	Winner	Second	Third
1969	(Belgium) Rik Van Looy	(Belgium) Victor Nuelant	(Belgium) Urbain De Brauwer
1970	(Belgium) Pol Mahieu	(Belgium) Jean-Pierre Monseré	(Netherlands) Joop Zoetemelk
1971	(France) Jacky Mourioux	(Belgium) Herman Vrijders	(Belgium) Maurice Eyers
1972	(Belgium) Ghislain Van Landeghem	(Belgium) Raphaël Van Bruane	(Belgium) Herman Van Springel
1973	(Belgium) Noël Van Clooster	(Belgium) Willy De Geest	(Belgium) Freddy Maertens
1974	(Belgium) Joseph Jacobs	(Netherlands) Tino Tabak	(Netherlands) Piet Van Katwijk
1975	(Belgium) Luc Leman	(Belgium) Gustaaf Van Roosbroeck	(Belgium) Herman Vrijders
1976	(Belgium) Ludo Van Stayen	(Belgium) Freddy Maertens	(Belgium) Walter Nagels
1977	(Belgium) Eric Jacques	(Belgium) Eric Van De Wiele	(Belgium) Etienne Van Der Helst
1978	(Belgium) Patrick Sercu	(Belgium) Johnny De Nul	(Belgium) Dirk Heirweg
1979	(Belgium) Patrick Lefevere	(Belgium) Herman Van Springel	(Belgium) Ferdi Van Den Haute
1980	(Belgium) Joseph Van De Poel	(Belgium) Roger Rosiers	(Belgium) Eric Van De Wiele
1981	(Belgium) Roger De Vlaeminck	(Belgium) Daniel Willems	(Belgium) Alfons De Wolf
1982	(Belgium) Dirk Heirweg	(Netherlands) Hans Langerijs	(Belgium) Patrick Vermeulen
1983	(Belgium) Luc Colijn	(Belgium) Joseph Van De Poel	(Netherlands) Johan Van Der Velde
