= 1978 Dwars door België =

Race details
- Dates: 2 April 1978
- Stages: 1
- Distance: 198 km (123.0 mi)
- Winning time: 4h 55' 00"

Results
	Winner	Jos Schipper (NED)
	Second	Frank Hoste (BEL)
	Third	Guido van Sweevelt (BEL)

The 1978 Dwars door België was the 33rd edition of the Dwars door Vlaanderen cycle race and was held on 2 April 1978. The race started and finished in Waregem. The race was won by Jos Schipper.

== General classification ==
Final general classification

Rank	Rider	Time
1	Jos Schipper (NED)	4h 55' 00"
2	Frank Hoste (BEL)	+ 0"
3	Guido van Sweevelt (BEL)	+ 0"
4	Ferdi Van Den Haute (BEL)	+ 0"
5	Alfons De Bal (BEL)	+ 0"
6	Walter Planckaert (BEL)	+ 0"
7	Dirk Baert (BEL)	+ 0"
8	Walter Godefroot (BEL)	+ 0"
9	Ad Prinsen (NED)	+ 0"
10	Marc Renier (BEL)	+ 0"
