= 1981 E3 Prijs Vlaanderen =

1981 E3 Harelbeke
Race details
- Dates: 28 March 1981
- Stages: 1
- Distance: 226 km (140 mi)
- Winning time: 5h 48' 00"

Results
	Winner	Jan Raas (NED)	(TI–Raleigh–Creda)
	Second	Ludo Delcroix (BEL)	(Capri Sonne–Koga Miyata)
	Third	Alfons De Wolf (BEL)	(Vermeer Thijs)

The 1981 E3 Harelbeke was the 24th edition of the E3 Harelbeke cycle race and was held on 28 March 1981. The race started and finished in Harelbeke. The race was won by Jan Raas of the TI–Raleigh team.

== General classification ==
Final general classification

Rank	Rider	Team	Time
1	Jan Raas (NED)	TI–Raleigh–Creda	5h 48' 00"
2	Ludo Delcroix (BEL)	Capri Sonne–Koga Miyata	+ 0"
3	Alfons De Wolf (BEL)	Vermeer Thijs	+ 1' 10"
4	Roger De Vlaeminck (BEL)	DAF Trucks–Côte d'Or	+ 1' 10"
5	Henk Lubberding (NED)	TI–Raleigh–Creda	+ 1' 10"
6	Jos Schipper (NED)	HB Alarmsystemen	+ 1' 10"
7	Hennie Kuiper (NED)	DAF Trucks–Côte d'Or	+ 1' 10"
8	Eddy Vanhaerens (BEL)	Boule d'Or–Sunair	+ 1' 10"
9	Eddy Planckaert (BEL)	Splendor–Wickes Bouwmarkt–Europ Decor	+ 1' 10"
10	Marc Demeyer (BEL)	Capri Sonne–Koga Miyata	+ 1' 10"
