= 1959 Harelbeke–Antwerp–Harelbeke =

Race details
- Dates: 17 May 1959
- Stages: 1
- Distance: 214 km (133 mi)
- Winning time: 5h 36' 18"

Results
	Winner	Norbert Kerckhove (BEL)
	Second	Jan Zagers (BEL)
	Third	Norbert Vantieghem (BEL)

The 1959 Harelbeke–Antwerp–Harelbeke (Note: The race was known as Harelbeke–Antwerp–Harelbeke (French: Harelbeke–Anvers–Harelbeke) for the first twelve editions. In 1970, the race became known as the E3, after the Belgian road which is now known as the E17.) was the second edition of the E3 Harelbeke cycle race and was held on 17 May 1959. The race started and finished in Harelbeke. The race was won by Norbert Kerckhove.

== General classification ==
Final general classification

Rank	Rider	Time
1	Norbert Kerckhove (BEL)	5h 36' 18"
2	Jan Zagers (BEL)	+ 2' 05"
3	Norbert Vantieghem (BEL)	+ 2' 05"
4	Jef Planckaert (BEL)	+ 2' 05"
5	Joseph Bosmans (BEL)	+ 2' 05"
6	Marcel Ryckaert (BEL)	+ 2' 05"
7	Jan van Gompel (BEL)	+ 2' 05"
8	Piet van den Brekel (NED)	+ 2' 05"
9	Georges Decraeye (BEL)	+ 2' 05"
10	Petrus Oellibrandt (BEL)	+ 2' 05"
