= 1967 Omloop Het Volk =

Race details
- Dates: 4 March 1967
- Stages: 1
- Distance: 203 km (126 mi)
- Winning time: 4h 59' 00"

Results
	Winner	Willy Vekemans (BEL)
	Second	Jozef Spruyt (BEL)
	Third	Edward Sels (BEL)

The 1967 Omloop Het Volk was the 22nd edition of the Omloop Het Volk cycle race and was held on 4 March 1967. The race started and finished in Ghent. The race was won by Willy Vekemans.

== General classification ==
Final general classification
Rank	Rider	Time
1	Willy Vekemans (BEL)	4h 59' 00"
2	Jozef Spruyt (BEL)	+ 0"
3	Edward Sels (BEL)	+ 0"
4	Jan Nolmans (BEL)	+ 0"
5	Bernard Van de Kerckhove (BEL)	+ 0"
6	Michael Wright (GBR)	+ 0"
7	Julien Delocht (BEL)	+ 0"
8	Roland Van De Rijse (BEL)	+ 0"
9	Johny Schleck (LUX)	+ 0"
10	Jan Lauwers (BEL)	+ 0"
