= 1972 E3 Prijs Vlaanderen =

1972 E3 Harelbeke
Race details
- Dates: 25 March 1972
- Stages: 1
- Distance: 226 km (140 mi)
- Winning time: 5h 39' 25"

Results
	Winner	Hubert Hutsebaut (BEL)
	Second	Eddy Merckx (BEL)
	Third	Walter Godefroot (BEL)

The 1972 E3 Harelbeke was the 15th edition of the E3 Harelbeke cycle race and was held on 25 March 1972. The race started and finished in Harelbeke. The race was won by Hubert Hutsebaut.

== General classification ==
Final general classification

Rank	Rider	Time
1	Hubert Hutsebaut (BEL)	5h 39' 25"
2	Eddy Merckx (BEL)	+ 0"
3	Walter Godefroot (BEL)	+ 0"
4	Noël Vantyghem (BEL)	+ 1' 14"
5	Frans Verbeeck (BEL)	+ 1' 14"
6	Ronny Van de Vijver (BEL)	+ 1' 14"
7	André Dierickx (BEL)	+ 1' 14"
8	Roger Rosiers (BEL)	+ 1' 14"
9	Ronald De Witte (BEL)	+ 1' 14"
10	Johan De Muynck (BEL)	+ 1' 14"
