= Carlos (cycling team) =

Belgian professional cycling team

- 1975 jersey

Team information
- Registered: Belgium
- Founded: 1975
- Disbanded: 1979
- Discipline: Road

Team name history
- 1975–1976 1977 1978 1979: Carlos; Carlos–Gipiemme; Carlos–Galli–Alan; Carlos–Galli–G.B.C.–Castelli

Carlos was a Belgian professional cycling team that existed from 1975 to 1979. Its main sponsor was bicycle company Carlos Cycles. The team competed in the 1979 Giro d'Italia, but did not have any wins.
