= Rollando Picchiotti =

Italian cyclist

Personal information
- Born: 22 January 1940 (age 86)

Cycling career
- Sport: Cycling
- Role: Rider

Rollando Picchiotti (born 22 January 1940) is an Italian racing cyclist. He rode in the 1966 Tour de France.
