= 1964 Harelbeke–Antwerp–Harelbeke =

Race details
- Dates: 14 March 1964
- Stages: 1
- Distance: 216 km (134 mi)
- Winning time: 5h 39' 00"

Results
	Winner	Rik Van Looy (BEL)
	Second	Norbert Kerckhove (BEL)
	Third	Edgard Sorgeloos (BEL)

The 1964 Harelbeke–Antwerp–Harelbeke (Note: The race was known as Harelbeke–Antwerp–Harelbeke (French: Harelbeke–Anvers–Harelbeke) for the first twelve editions. In 1970, the race became known as the E3, after the Belgian road which is now known as the E17.) was the seventh edition of the E3 Harelbeke cycle race and was held on 14 March 1964. The race started and finished in Harelbeke. The race was won by Rik Van Looy.

== General classification ==
Final general classification

Rank	Rider	Time
1	Rik Van Looy (BEL)	5h 39' 00"
2	Norbert Kerckhove (BEL)	+ 0"
3	Edgard Sorgeloos (BEL)	+ 0"
4	Willy Schroeders (BEL)	+ 0"
5	Georges Vandenberghe (BEL)	+ 2' 20"
6	André Noyelle (BEL)	+ 2' 20"
7	Roger De Breuker (BEL)	+ 2' 20"
8	Arie den Hartog (NED)	+ 2' 20"
9	Jos Dewit (BEL)	+ 2' 30"
10	Emiel Lambrecht (BEL)	+ 2' 30"
