= Raymond Lebreton =

French cyclist (1941–2022)

Personal information
- Born: 29 August 1941 Vassy, Calvados, France
- Died: 6 August 2022 (aged 80)

Cycling career
- Sport: Cycling
- Discipline: Road
- Role: Rider

Amateur team
- 1964-65: Stella

Professional teams
- 1966: Kamomé–Dilecta
- 1967: Tigra - Enicar

Raymond Lebreton (29 August 1941 – 6 August 2022) was a French racing cyclist. He rode in the 1966 Tour de France, with team Kamomé–Dilecta. His last stage that tour was stage 16, where he finished with another 28 riders outside the time limit.

He died on 6 August 2022, at the age of 80.
