= 1966 Harelbeke–Antwerp–Harelbeke =

Race details
- Dates: 26 March 1966
- Stages: 1
- Distance: 216 km (134 mi)
- Winning time: 5h 59' 00"

Results
	Winner	Rik Van Looy (BEL)
	Second	Willy Bocklant (BEL)
	Third	Jozef Spruyt (BEL)

The 1966 Harelbeke–Antwerp–Harelbeke (Note: The race was known as Harelbeke–Antwerp–Harelbeke (French: Harelbeke–Anvers–Harelbeke) for the first twelve editions. In 1970, the race became known as the E3, after the Belgian road which is now known as the E17.) was the ninth edition of the E3 Harelbeke cycle race and was held on 26 March 1966. The race started and finished in Harelbeke. The race was won by Rik Van Looy.

== General classification ==
Final general classification

Rank	Rider	Time
1	Rik Van Looy (BEL)	5h 59' 00"
2	Willy Bocklant (BEL)	+ 0"
3	Jozef Spruyt (BEL)	+ 0"
4	Roger Swerts (BEL)	+ 0"
5	Robert De Middeleir (BEL)	+ 0"
6	André Planckaert (BEL)	+ 0"
7	Alfons Hermans (BEL)	+ 0"
8	Willy Hoogewijs (BEL)	+ 0"
9	Noël De Pauw (BEL)	+ 0"
10	Armand Desmet (BEL)	+ 35"
