= Guerrando Lenzi =

Italian cyclist

Personal information
- Born: 6 September 1939 Quarrata
- Died: 7 May 2017 (aged 77)

Cycling career
- Sport: Cycling
- Role: Rider

Guerrando Lenzi (6 September 1939 – 9 May 2017) was an Italian racing cyclist. He rode in the 1966 Tour de France.
