= Georges Van Coningsloo =

Belgian cyclist

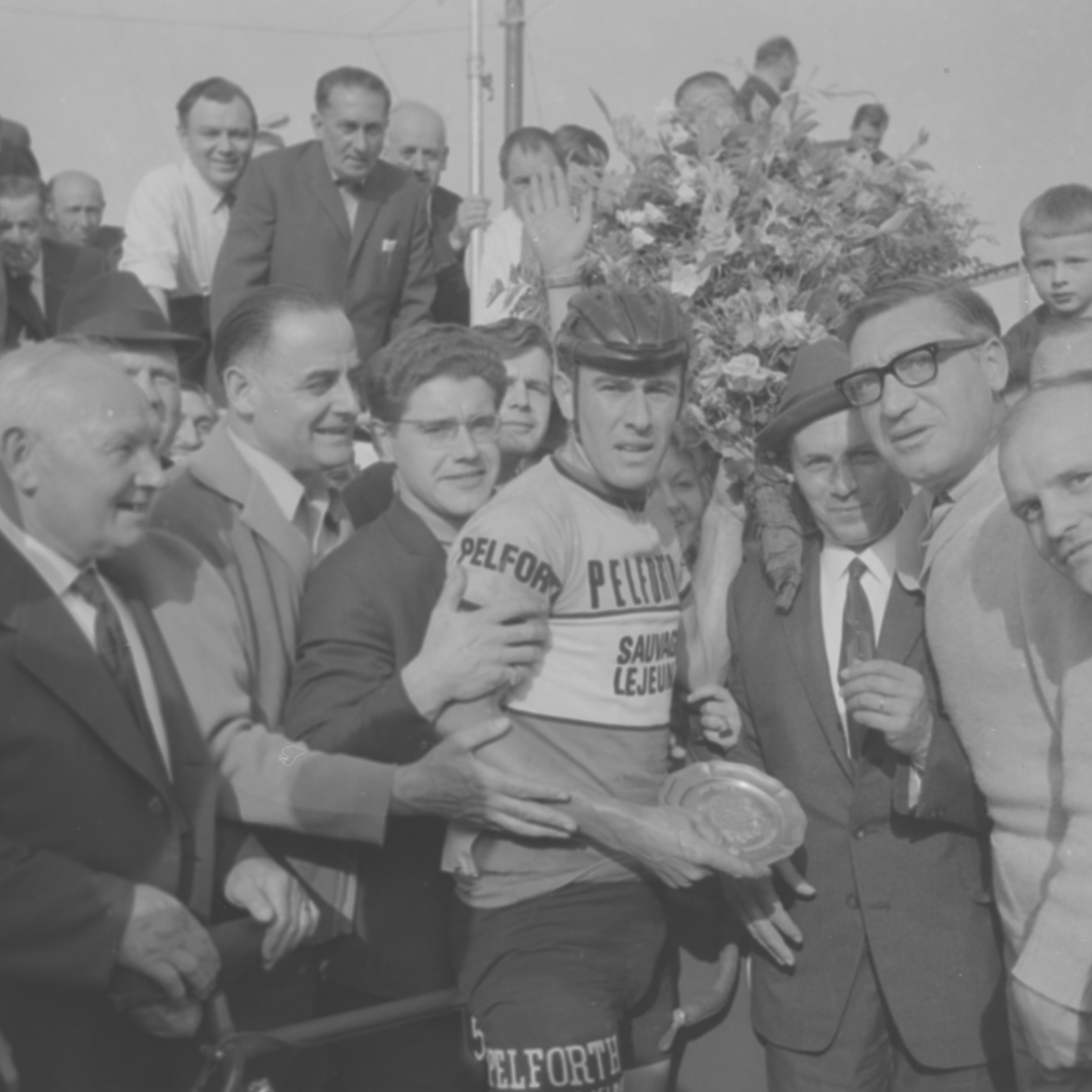
- Van Coningsloo after winning 1967 Gullegem Koerse

Personal information
- Born: 27 October 1940 Wavre, Belgium
- Died: 7 April 2002 (aged 61) Grez-Doiceau, Belgium

Cycling career
- Sport: Cycling
- Discipline: Road
- Role: Rider

Professional teams
- 1963: Solo–Terrot
- 1964–1970: Peugeot–BP–Englebert
- 1971–1972: Molteni
- 1973: Watney–Maes Pils
- 1974: Robot–Gazelle

Georges Van Coningsloo (27 October 1940 – 7 April 2002) was a Belgian racing cyclist.

== Career ==
Van Coningsloo was a professional from 1963 to 1974. In 1967, he won Bordeaux–Paris, after a 370 kilometer breakaway.

He rode in four Grand Tours in his career: three editions of the Tour de France, and the 1970 Vuelta a España, but failed to finish all of the races.

His son Philippe was also a high level cyclist. He died, however, before turning professional, after suffering a heart attack during a race. In his honor, a race called the Memorial Philippe Van Coningsloo is held in July. His other son, Olivier, was also a professional cyclist, who rode for two seasons before ending his career.

== Major results ==
1958
1st Overall Liège–La Gleize
1963
4th La Flèche Wallonne
10th Liège–Bastogne–Liège
1964
1st Paris–Brussels
2nd Liège–Bastogne–Liège
5th Tour of Flanders
5th Milan–San Remo
5th Rund um den Henninger Turm
1965
1st Ronde van Limburg
1st Grand Prix de Fourmies
1st Stage 8 Paris–Nice
1st Stage 7 Critérium du Dauphiné Libéré
1st Stage 1 Tour of Belgium
2nd E3 Prijs Vlaanderen
2nd Brabantse Pijl
3rd Rund um den Henninger Turm
5th La Flèche Wallonne
10th Paris–Roubaix
1966
5th Overall Tour of Belgium
9th La Flèche Wallonne
1967
1st Bordeaux–Paris
2nd Overall Tour de Wallonie
2nd Overall Paris–Luxembourg
3rd Rund um den Henninger Turm
5th Milan–San Remo
1968
4th Overall Tour de l'Oise
1969
1st Stage 2B Tour de l'Oise
2nd E3 Prijs Vlaanderen
4th Bordeaux–Paris
7th Paris–Tours
8th Milan–San Remo
9th Overall Tour de Luxembourg
1970
2nd Ronde van Limburg
1971
1st Grand Prix Pino Cerami
4th Tour of Flanders
6th Brabantse Pijl
1972
1st Flèche Hesbignonne
1973
2nd Flèche Hesbignonne
