= Jan Boonen =

Belgian cyclist

Personal information
- Born: 25 March 1940 (age 86)

Cycling career
- Sport: Cycling
- Role: Rider

Jan Boonen (born 25 March 1940) is a Belgian racing cyclist. He rode in the 1966 Tour de France.
