= Alain Le Grèves =

French cyclist

Personal information
- Born: 12 October 1939
- Died: 20 September 2000 (aged 60)

Cycling career
- Sport: Cycling
- Role: Rider

Alain Le Grèves (12 October 1939 – 20 September 2000) was a French racing cyclist. He rode in the 1966 Tour de France.
