= Henri Guimbard =

French cyclist (1938–2024)

Personal information
- Born: 28 July 1938
- Died: 23 September 2024 (aged 86)

Cycling career
- Sport: Cycling
- Role: Rider

Henri Guimbard (28 July 1938 – 23 September 2024) was a French racing cyclist. He rode in the 1966 Tour de France.

Guimbard died on 23 September 2024, at the age of 86.
