= 2006 E3 Prijs Vlaanderen =

Race details
- Dates: 25 March 2006
- Stages: 1
- Distance: 203 km (126 mi)
- Winning time: 4h 43' 38"

Results
	Winner	Tom Boonen (BEL)	(Quick-Step–Innergetic)
	Second	Alessandro Ballan (ITA)	(Lampre–Fondital)
	Third	Aart Vierhouten (NED)	(Skil–Shimano)

The 2006 E3 Prijs Vlaanderen was the 49th edition of the E3 Harelbeke cycle race and was held on 25 March 2006. The race started and finished in Harelbeke. The race was won by Tom Boonen of the Quick-Step team.

== General classification ==
Final general classification

Rank	Rider	Team	Time
1	Tom Boonen (BEL)	Quick-Step–Innergetic	4h 43' 38"
2	Alessandro Ballan (ITA)	Lampre–Fondital	+ 2"
3	Aart Vierhouten (NED)	Skil–Shimano	+ 1' 32"
4	Bert De Waele (BEL)	Landbouwkrediet–Colnago	+ 1' 32"
5	Leif Hoste (BEL)	Discovery Channel	+ 1' 32"
6	Marcus Ljungqvist (SWE)	Team CSC	+ 1' 42"
7	Luca Paolini (ITA)	Liquigas	+ 1' 42"
8	Roger Hammond (GBR)	Discovery Channel	+ 1' 42"
9	Peter Van Petegem (BEL)	Davitamon–Lotto	+ 1' 42"
10	Baden Cooke (AUS)	Unibet.com	+ 1' 42"
