= Herman Vanspringel =

Belgian cyclist (1943–2022)

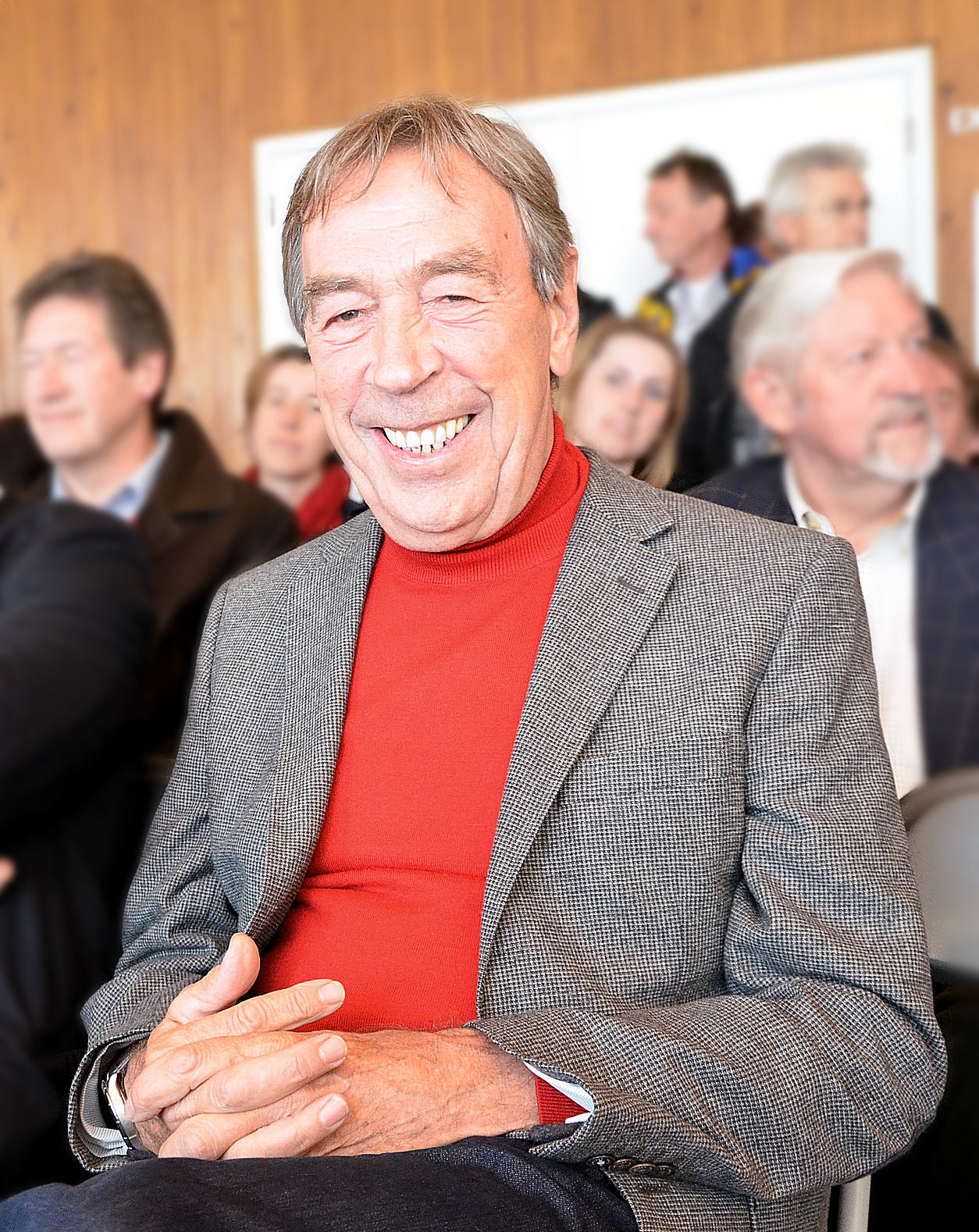
- Vanspringel in 2013

Personal information
- Full name: Herman Vanspringel
- Nickname: Monsieur Bordeaux–Paris
- Born: 14 August 1943 Ranst, Belgium
- Died: 22 August 2022 (aged 79) Grobbendonk, Belgium

Cycling career
- Sport: Cycling
- Discipline: Road
- Role: Rider
- Rider type: Sprinter, Time Trial

Professional teams
- 1965: Dr Mann
- 1966–1970: Mann–Grundig
- 1971–1972: Molteni
- 1973: Rokado
- 1974: MIC–Ludo–De Gribaldy
- 1975–1976: Flandria–Velda
- 1977: IJsboerke–Colnago
- 1978–1979: Marc Zeepcentrale–Superia
- 1980–1981: Safir–Ludo

Major wins
- Grand Tours Tour de France Points classification (1973) 5 individual stages (1967, 1968, 1969, 1971) One-day races and Classics National Road Race Championships (1971) Gent–Wevelgem (1966) Omloop Het Volk (1968) Giro di Lombardia (1968) Paris–Tours (1969) À travers Lausanne (1969) Bordeaux–Paris (1970, 1974, 1975, 1977, 1978, 1980, 1981) Brabantse Pijl (1970, 1974) GP Union Dortmund (1971) Meisterschaft von Zürich (1971) E3 Prijs Vlaanderen (1974) Other Super Prestige Pernod International (1968) Grand Prix des Nations (1969, 1970) Interclubs team time trial (1972)
Medal record
Representing Belgium
Men's road bicycle racing
World Championships
Silver medal – second place	1968 Imola	Elite Men's Road Race

Herman Vanspringel (14 August 1943 – 25 August 2022), also spelled Herman Van Springel, was a Belgian road racing cyclist, from Grobbendonk, in the Flemish Campine or Kempen region. He achieved podium finishes in all three of the grand tours with second place in the 1968 Tour de France and 1971 Giro d'Italia, and third place in the 1970 Vuelta a España. He wore the maillot jaune during four stages of the 1968 Tour de France and for three stages in 1973.

== Career ==
Vanspringel was an accomplished time-trial rider, almost winning the Tour de France in 1968. He was beaten in the last stage by Dutch rider Jan Janssen in a time-trial. This remains as one of the closest races in Tour de France history. In the autumn that year, he won the classic Giro di Lombardia.

He won a record seven editions of the marathon Bordeaux–Paris. He also won the Green Jersey in the 1973 Tour de France without winning a single stage. He finished in 6th place overall that year, the third time in his career he would finish in the top 10 of the Tour de France. He would finish in the top 10 one final time during the 1974 edition. He would win a total of five stages during his ten participations in the Tour.

He was not allowed to ride the 1972 Tour de France due to signing for rival team Rokado for the 1973 season.

Vanspringel cycled through the 1970s and ended his career at the end of the 1981 season. As a professional cyclist, he eventually won 136 road races.

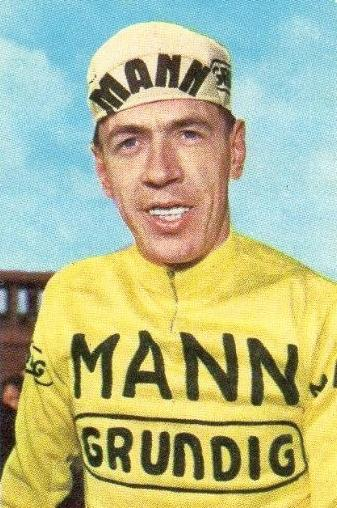
Vanspringel in 1970

Flemish TV-maker and presenter, Mark Uytterhoeven, motivated by the 1968 Tour, founded a Herman Vanspringel fan club.

== Major results ==
1963
3rd Tour de Liège
1964
3rd Brussels-Opwijk
1966
1st Gent–Wevelgem
1st Brussel–Ingooigem
1st Flèche Hesbignonne
1st Grote Prijs Jef Scherens
1st Stage 2 Critérium du Dauphiné Libéré
1st Prix de St. Amands
3rd Milan–San Remo
3rd Circuit des Frontières
6th Overall Tour de France
1967
1st Stages 6 (TTT) & Stage 7 Tour de France
1st Flèche Hesbignonne
2nd Overall Tour of Belgium

1st Stage 2b

2nd Bordeaux–Paris
2nd Grote Prijs Jef Scherens
3rd Antwerpse Havenpijl
1968
1st Super Prestige Pernod International
2nd Road race, UCI Road World Championships
2nd Overall Tour de France

1st Stages 3 (TTT) & 13
Held after stages 3a-3b and 19-22a

1st Giro di Lombardia
1st Omloop Het Volk
1st Omloop van Midden-België
1st Trefle a Quatre Feuilles
2nd Paris–Roubaix
2nd Grand Prix des Nations
2nd Trofeo Baracchi (with Ole Ritter)
2nd Wattrelos–Meulebeke
3rd Rund um den Henninger Turm
3rd Overall Tour de Suisse

1st Stage 1

3rd Overall Tour of Belgium

1st Stage 1

3rd E3 Harelbeke
1969
1st Stages 10 and 21 Tour de France
1st Paris–Tours
1st Stages 4, 7 and 10 Tour de Suisse
1st Grand Prix des Nations
1st Overall À travers Lausanne

1st Stages 1 (TTT) & 2

1st Stage 1 Four Days of Dunkirk
1st Rund um den Henninger-Turm
1st Trofeo Baracchi (with Joaquim Agostinho)
1st G.P de Baden-Baden (with Roger De Vlaeminck)
1st Omloop van Midden-België
1st GP van Malderen
2nd Giro di Lombardia
2nd Wattrelos–Meulebeke
2nd Grand Prix Pino Cerami
3rd Overall Tour of Belgium

1st Stage 2b

3rd Rund um den Henninger Turm
3rd Gran Premio di Lugano
1970
1st Bordeaux–Paris
1st Brabantse Pijl
1st Grand Prix des Nations
1st Schaal Sels
1st Heistse Pijl
1st Omloop Schelde-Durme
1st Omloop van het Zuidwesten
1st Stage 3 Tour of Belgium
2nd Belgian National Road Race Championships
2nd Critérium des As
3rd Overall Vuelta a España
3rd Overall Critérium du Dauphiné Libéré
3rd Trofeo Baracchi with Willy In't Ven
1971
1st National Road race Championships
1st Stages 1 (TTT) & 16b Tour de France
1st Züri-Metzgete
1st Nokere Koerse
1st G.P de Baden-Baden (with Eddy Merckx)
1st GP Union Dortmund
1st Wattrelos–Meulebeke
1st Cronostafetta
1st Maaslandse Pijl
2nd Overall Giro d'Italia
2nd Overall Tour of Belgium

1st Stage 3

2nd Paris–Roubaix
2nd Boucles de l'Aulne
3rd Overall Giro di Sardegna
3rd Gran Premio di Lugano
1972
1st Interclubs TTT, National Road Championships
1st GP Stad Zottegem
1st Cronostafetta
1st Trofee Luc Van Biesen
1st Kessel–Lier
1st Brussels–Biévenne
1st Wezenbeek–Oppem
2nd Brabantse Pijl
2nd Scheldeprijs
2nd Overall Tour de la Nouvelle-France
2nd Leeuwse Pijl
2nd Giro del Mendrisio
2nd Trefle a Quatre Feuilles
3rd Liège–Bastogne–Liège
3rd Tour du Condroz
3rd Subida a Arrate
3rd Omloop der Grensstreek
1973
1st Stage 9 Volta a Catalunya
1st Stage 4 Tour de Suisse
1st Stage 6 (TTT) Paris–Nice
2nd Grand Prix of Aargau Canton
2nd Overall Tour of Belgium

1st Stage 1 (TTT)

2nd Overall Giro di Sardegna
3rd Amstel Gold Race
3rd Brabantse Pijl
3rd Giro di Lombardia
3rd Overall Setmana Catalana de Ciclisme
6th Overall Tour de France

1st points classification
Held after stages 1b-2b

1974
1st Brabantse Pijl
1st E3 Prijs Vlaanderen
1st Boucles de l'Aulne
1st Bordeaux–Paris
1st GP Betekom
3rd Overall Tour de Luxembourg
3rd Grand Prix Impanis-Van Petegem
1975
1st Bordeaux–Paris
1st GP Desselgem
1st Omloop van Oost-Vlaanderen
2nd Critérium des As
3rd Overall Tour de Luxembourg
3rd Omloop van Neeroeteren
1976
1st Nationale Sluitingsprijs
1st Grand Prix de Wallonie
2nd Bordeaux–Paris
2nd Rebecq-Rognon
2nd Omloop der Leievallei
1977
1st Bordeaux–Paris
1st Stage 7 Paris–Nice
1st Stage 2 Three Days of De Panne
2nd Flèche Hesbignonne
2nd Critérium des As
3rd La Flèche Wallonne
1978
1st Bordeaux–Paris
1st Le Samyn
1st Omloop van het Houtland
2nd Gullegem Koerse
2nd Brabantse Pijl
3rd Critérium des As
1979
2nd Overall Tour of Belgium

1st Stage 5

2nd Omloop der Grensstreek
3rd Bordeaux–Paris

1st Stage 4a

3rd GP Stad Zottegem
1980
1st Bordeaux–Paris
2nd Critérium des As
3rd Grand Prix Impanis-Van Petegem
3rd Omloop van Midden-Brabant
1981
1st Bordeaux–Paris
2nd Critérium des As
2nd Nokere Koerse
2nd GP Beeckman

=== Grand Tour general classification results timeline ===
Grand Tour	1966	1967	1968	1969	1970	1971	1972	1973	1974	1975	1976
Vuelta a España	—	—	—	—	3	—	—	11	—	—	29
Giro d'Italia	—	—	—	—	—	2	—	—	—	—	—
Tour de France	6	24	2	18	DNF	14	—	6	10	31	DNF

Legend
—	Did not compete
DNF	Did not finish

== Honours ==
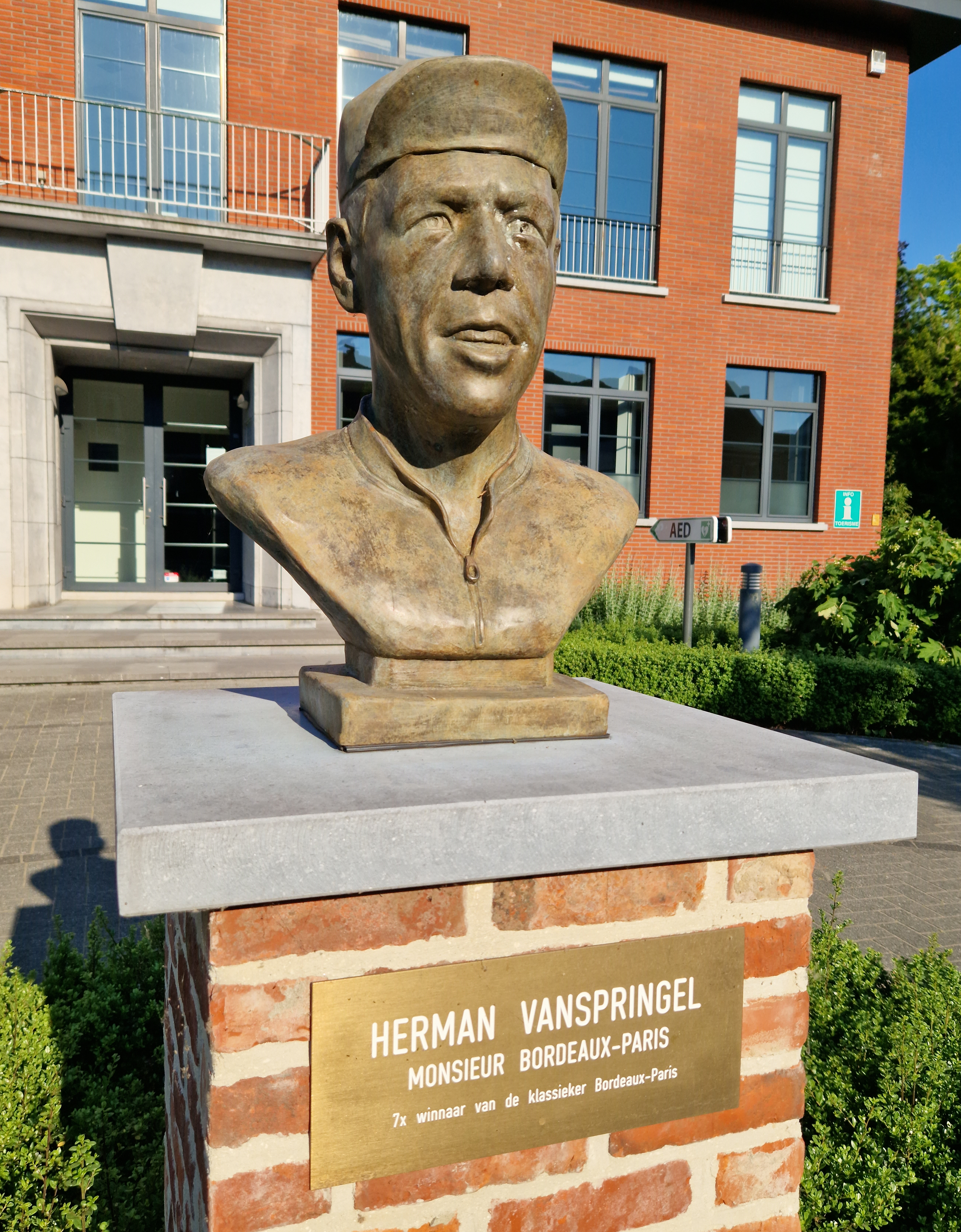
Bust of Herman Vanspringel

- A cycling race, Herman Vanspringels Diamond: From 1988
- Honorary Citizen of Grobbendonk
- Honorary Citizen of Kalmthout
- A bust in Grobbendonk: 2022

== Books ==
- Herman Vanspringel – De Winnende Verliezer (112p, ISBN 978-90-5312-139-9) by Robert Janssens and Tom Willems: 1999
- Herman Vanspringel (48p, ISBN 978-90-74128-33-9) by Noël Truyers: 1999
- Herman Vanspringel 68 (159p, ISBN 978-94-91376-01-6) by Mark Uytterhoeven: 2011
- Herman Vanspringels Diamonds For Ever (207p) by Luc Wuyts and Marc Uytterhoeven: 2020
