= Hubert Hutsebaut =

Belgian cyclist

Personal information
- Born: 24 June 1947 (age 79) Lendelede, Belgium

Cycling career
- Sport: Cycling
- Role: Rider

Hubert Hutsebaut (born 24 June 1947) is a Belgian former professional racing cyclist. He won the E3 Harelbeke in 1972.
