= Willy Van den Eynde =

Belgian cyclist

Personal information
- Born: 20 April 1943 (age 83)

Cycling career
- Sport: Cycling
- Role: Rider

Willy Van den Eynde (born 20 April 1943) is a Belgian racing cyclist. He rode in the 1966 Tour de France.
