= Jan Nolmans =

Belgian cyclist

Personal information
- Born: 12 July 1944 (age 82)

Cycling career
- Sport: Cycling
- Role: Rider

Jan Nolmans (born 12 July 1944) is a Belgian racing cyclist. He rode in the 1966 Tour de France.
