= Prix citron =

French cycling award

The Prix citron (French: [pʁi̥ si̥ːtʁõ]; French: Lemon Prize) is an award given annually by the French Magazine L'Équipe to the Tour de France rider voted least likeable or least co-operative with the press. The Award is a semi-serious rebuke by international cycling journalists to the professionals they cover. It is announced together with the newer Prix orange, given to the rider(s) voted most likeable or most co-operative by journalists.

== Origins ==
At the conclusion of every Tour the prize is announced by France's largest sporting magazine, L'Équipe. Two Lemons and Two Oranges are awarded, to one French and Non-French cyclist apiece. Votes are solicited by the magazine to cycling journalists around the world.

The Tour de France is well-known for its numerous official and semi-official prizes, with the Prix citron falling among the latter. It stands alongside similar tongue-in-cheek prizes like the Lanterne Rouge (awarded to each stage's slowest rider), and the Top Banana (awarded daily by "Rouleur" magazine to an "Unsung rider").

== See also ==
- Maillot jaune
- Maillot vert
- Maillot blanc
- Maillot à pois
- Dossard gris (formerly « Le Dossard rouge »)
- Dossard jaune
- Lanterne rouge
- Souvenir Henri Desgrange
- Gans de tour (Unluckiest Rider)
- Prix Alex Virot (Most Loyal Rider)
- Prix René Dunan (Youngest Rider to Complete the Tour)
