= Col de la Bonette =

Mountain pass in the French Alps

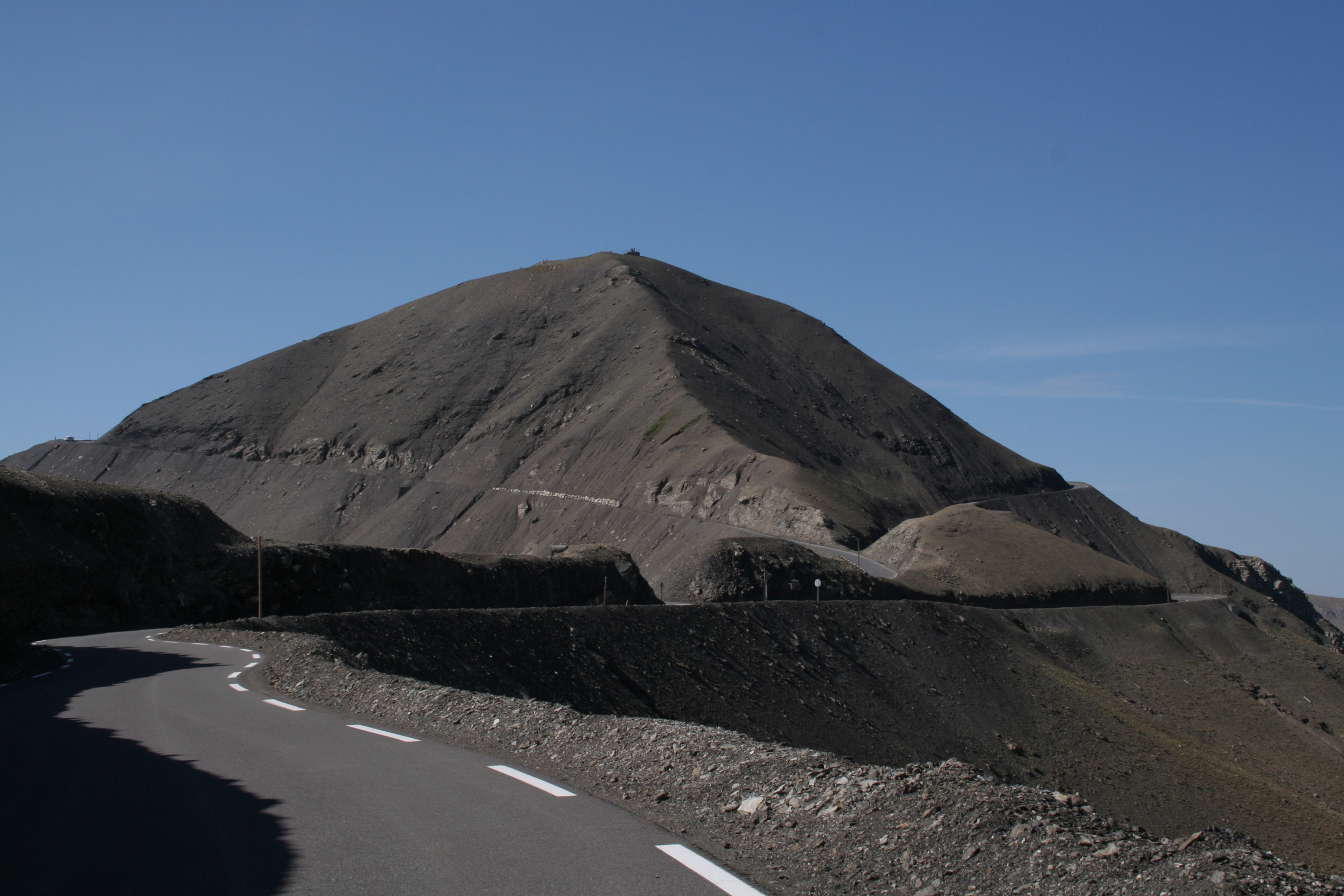
- Cime de la Bonette, viewed from the northern ascent from Jausiers. The Col de la Bonette is marked by the gap in the centre of the picture, while the circle road takes a loop up and around the Cime de la Bonette, before joining the col behind the ridge.

- Location within Alps
- Elevation: 2,715 metres (8,907 ft) or 2,802 metres (9,193 ft) (Cime de la Bonette)
- Traversed by: D64

Location
- Location: Alpes-Maritimes/Alpes-de-Haute-Provence, France
- Range: Alps
- Coordinates: 44°19′37.2″N 06°48′25.2″E

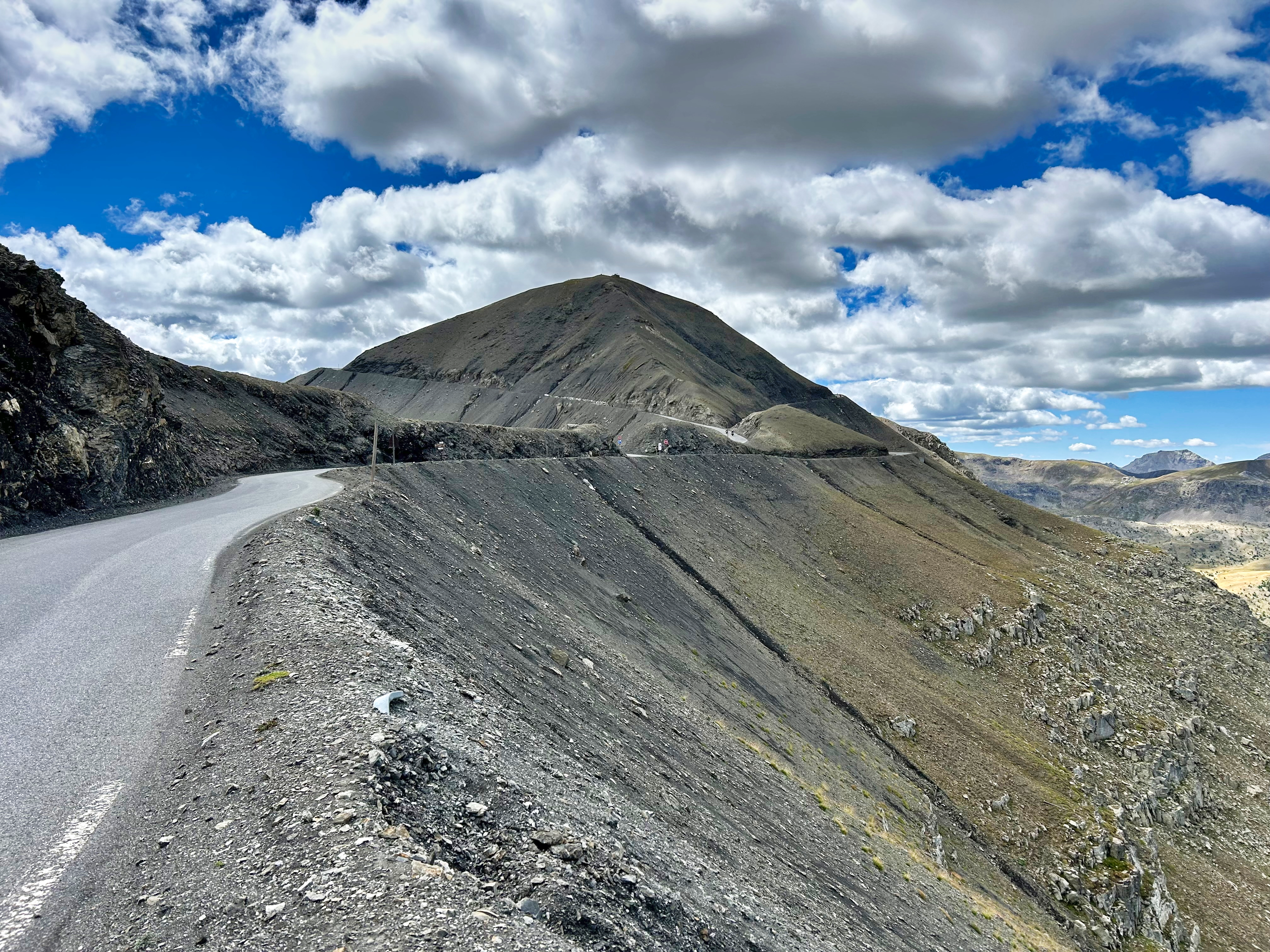
Col de la Bonette

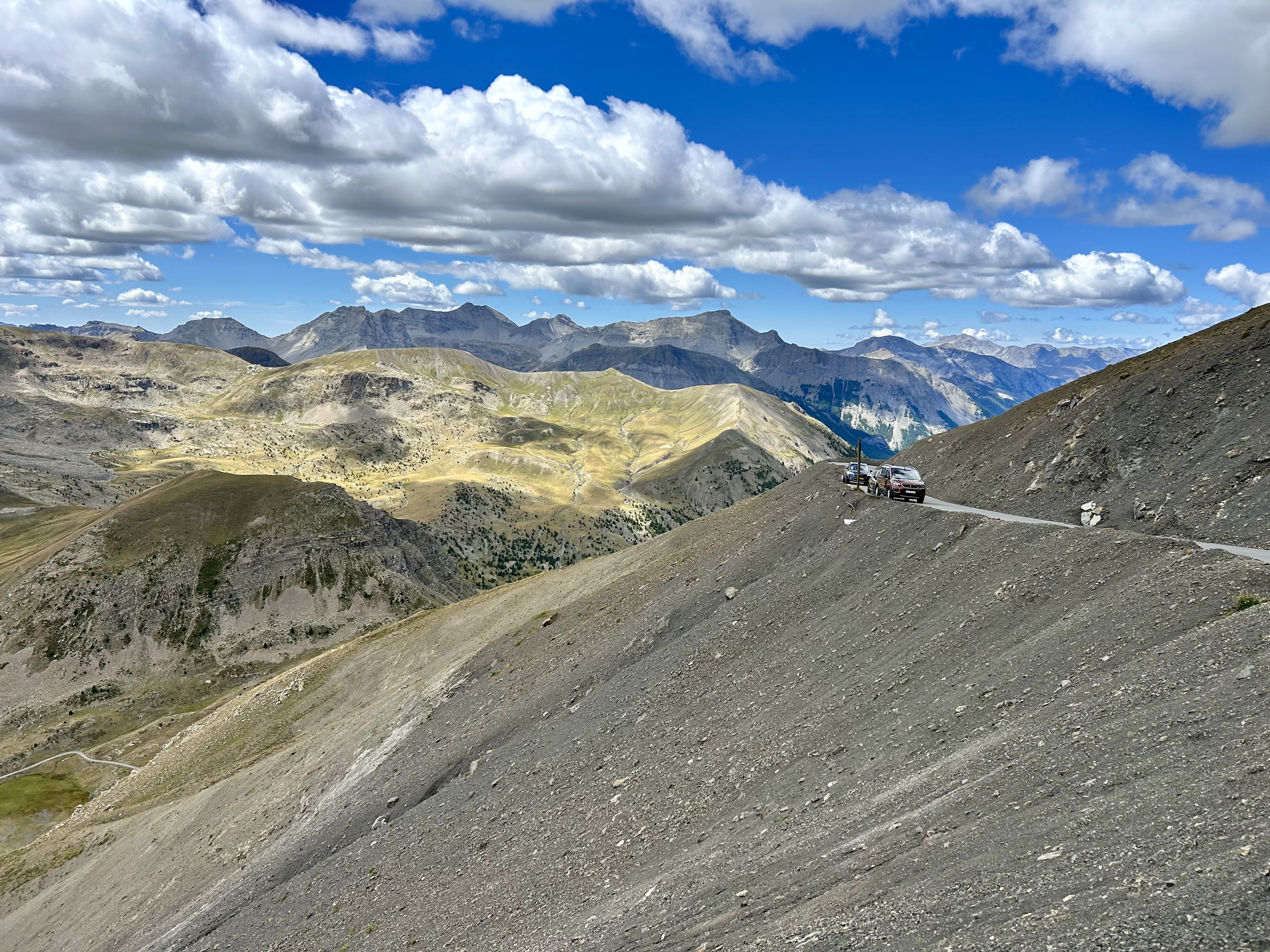
Col de la Cime de la Bonette

Col de la Bonette (el. 2,715 metres (8,907 ft)) is a high mountain pass in the French Alps, near the border with Italy. It is situated within the Mercantour National Park on the border of the departments of Alpes-Maritimes and Alpes-de-Haute-Provence. The road over the col is the eighth highest paved road in the Alps.

== Col de Restefond ==
The passage over the Col de la Bonette is often mistakenly referred to as the Col de Restefond, and in the 2008 Tour de France the summit was referred to as the Cime de la Bonette-Restefond. Stage 16 of the tour approached the summit from Saint-Étienne-de-Tinée (south-east), and after reaching the Col de la Bonette, took a loop round the Cime de la Bonette reaching the summit of 2,802 m (9,193 ft), which is the highest point reached by the Tour de France, before re-passing the Col de la Bonette. On the descent to Jausiers, the actual Col de Restefond was then passed on the right approximately 1 km from the summit.

== "Highest road in Europe" ==
The two kilometre long teardrop shaped loop around the Cime de la Bonette peak (2,860 m (9,380 ft)) from either side of the pass is the highest paved through route in the Alps.

The road around the Cime de la Bonette reaches an altitude of 2,802 m (9,193 ft), but this is not a "pass", but merely a scenic loop. It is, however, the highest asphalted road in France and is the highest through road in Europe.

== Tour de France ==
The pass has featured in the Tour de France five times (1962, 1964, 1993, 2008, and 2024). In 1962 and 1964, the race was led over the summit in both years by Federico Bahamontes, approaching from the south in 1962 and from the north in 1964. Robert Millar led over the summit (from the north) in 1993.

In 2008 John-Lee Augustyn led over the mountain (from the south), before falling on the descent to Jausiers.

=== Appearances in Tour de France ===
| Year | Stage | Category | Start | Finish | Leader at the summit |
|---|---|---|---|---|---|
| 2024 | 19 | HC | Embrun | Isola 2000 | Richard Carapaz (ECU) |
| 2008 | 16 | HC | Cuneo | Jausiers | John-Lee Augustyn (RSA) |
| 1993 | 11 | HC | Serre Chevalier | Isola 2000 | Robert Millar (GBR) |
| 1964 | 9 | 1 | Briançon | Monaco | Federico Bahamontes (ESP) |
| 1962 | 18 | 1 | Juan-les-Pins | Briançon | Federico Bahamontes (ESP) |
