= Jean Selic =

French cyclist

Personal information
- Born: 16 August 1934 (age 92) Sorbiers, France

Cycling career
- Sport: Cycling
- Role: Rider

Jean Selic (born 16 August 1934) is a French racing cyclist. He rode in the 1962 Tour de France.
