= Col de Restefond =

Mountain pass in the French Alps

- Location within Alps
- Elevation: 2,680 m (8,790 ft)
- Traversed by: D64

Third Approach
- Location: Alpes-de-Haute-Provence, France
- Range: Alps
- Coordinates: 44°20′9.6″N 06°48′28.8″E

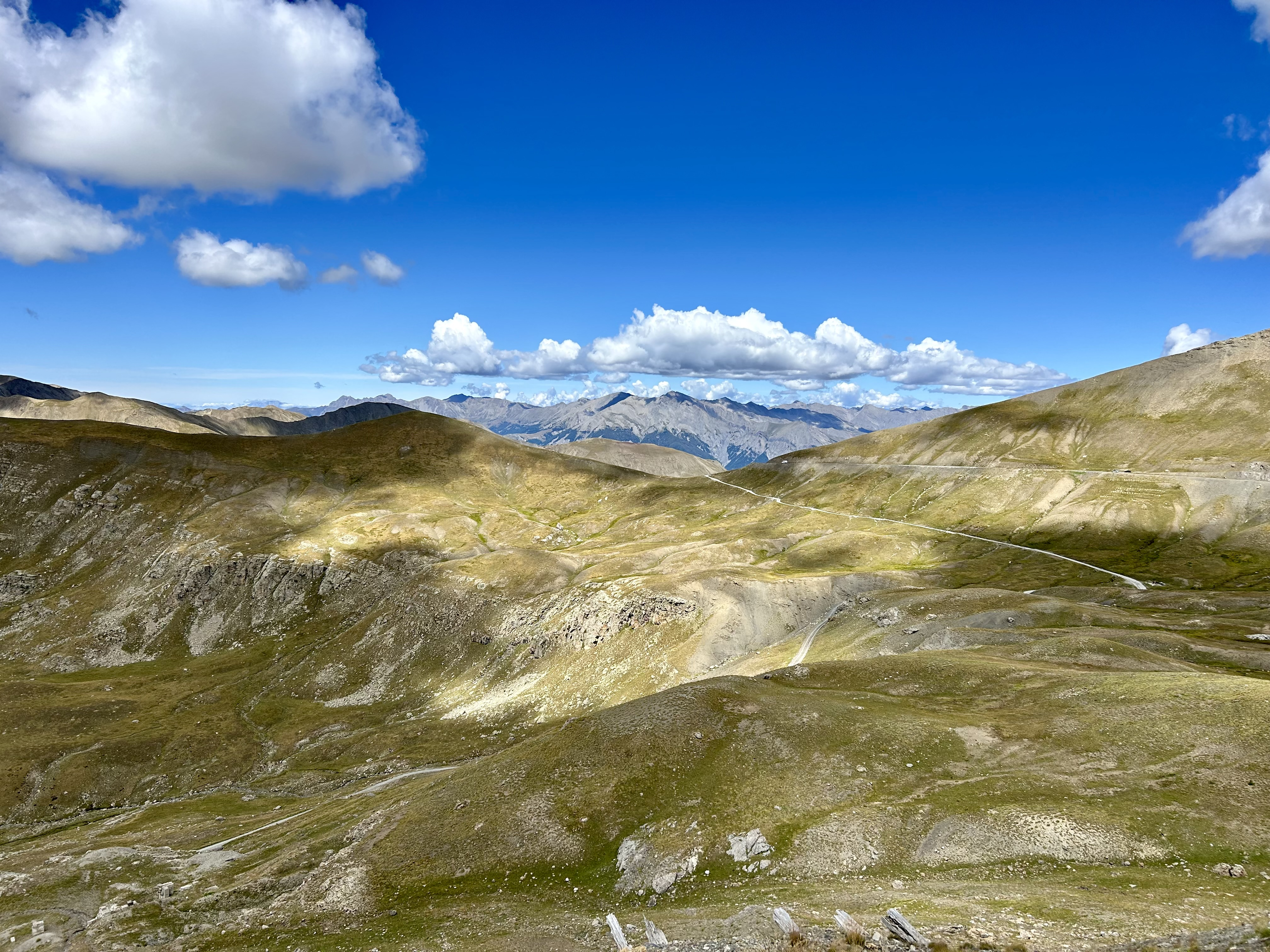
Col de Restefond

Col de Restefond (el. 2,680 metres (8,790 ft)) is a high mountain pass in the French Alps, near the border with Italy. It is situated on the flanks of le Restefonde within the Mercantour National Park in the department of Alpes-de-Haute-Provence.

The actual pass is situated on a gravel track leading off the D64 close to its summit at the Col de la Bonette (2715 m). The passage over the Col de la Bonette is often mistakenly referred to as the Col de Restefond, and in the 2008 Tour de France the summit was referred to as the Cime de la Bonette-Restefond. Stage 16 of the tour approached the summit from Saint-Étienne-de-Tinée (south-east), and after reaching the Col de la Bonette, took a loop round the Cime de la Bonette reaching the summit of 2802 m, which is the highest point reached by the Tour de France, before re-passing the Col de la Bonette. On the descent to Jausiers, the actual Col de Restefond was passed on the right approximately 1 km from the summit.

This pass, like many others in the region, is generally impassable due to ice and snow from November to May.

Close by are various ancient blockhouses, remnants of the Maginot Line's Alpine extension, the Alpine Line. The Ouvrage Col de Restefond consisted of three infantry blocks facing Italy.

== See also ==
- List of highest paved roads in Europe
- List of mountain passes
