= Cime de la Bonette =

Mountain in France

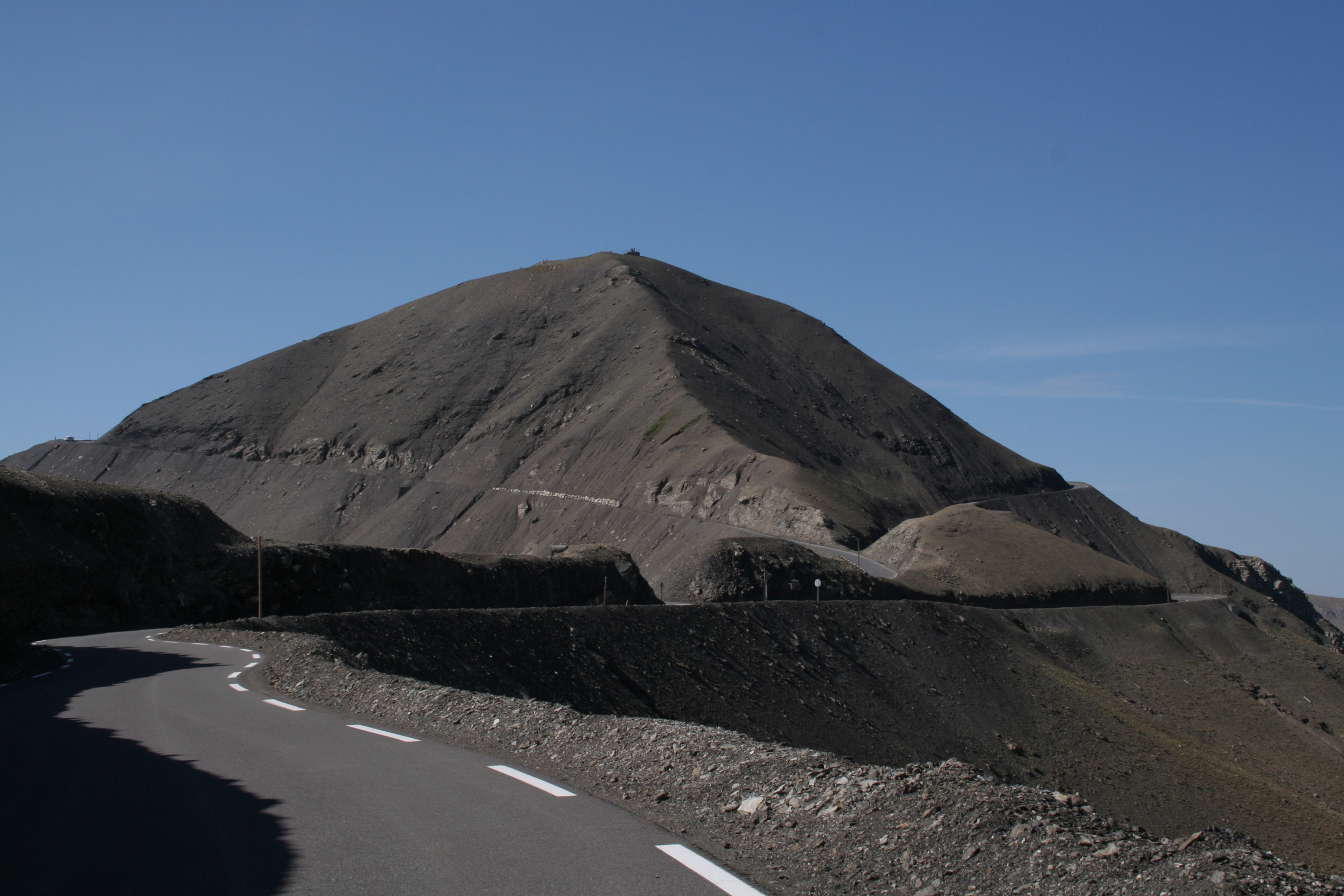
- Cime de la Bonette, viewed from the northern ascent of the Col de la Bonette pass from Jausiers

Highest point
- Elevation: 2,860 m (9,380 ft)
- Prominence: 180 m (590 ft)
- Isolation: 6.01 km (3.73 mi)
- Coordinates: 44°19′18″N 06°48′25″E

Geography
- Location within France
- Location: France
- Parent range: Massif du Mercantour-Argentera

Cime de la Bonette (el. 2,860 metres or 9,383 feet) is a mountain in the French Alps, near the border with Italy. It is situated within the Mercantour National Park on the border of the departments of Alpes-Maritimes and Alpes-de-Haute-Provence, between the Ubaye Valley and the valley of the Tinée River.

"Cime" means "summit" in French.

The summit is surrounded by road from the Col de la Bonette, which reaches 2,802 metres (9,193 ft), and is the second highest paved through route in the Alps. It is also the highest point ever reached by the Tour de France.

== See also ==
- Col de Restefond
- List of highest paved roads in Europe
- List of mountain passes
