= 1964 Tour de France, Stage 12 to Stage 22b =

Cycling race stages

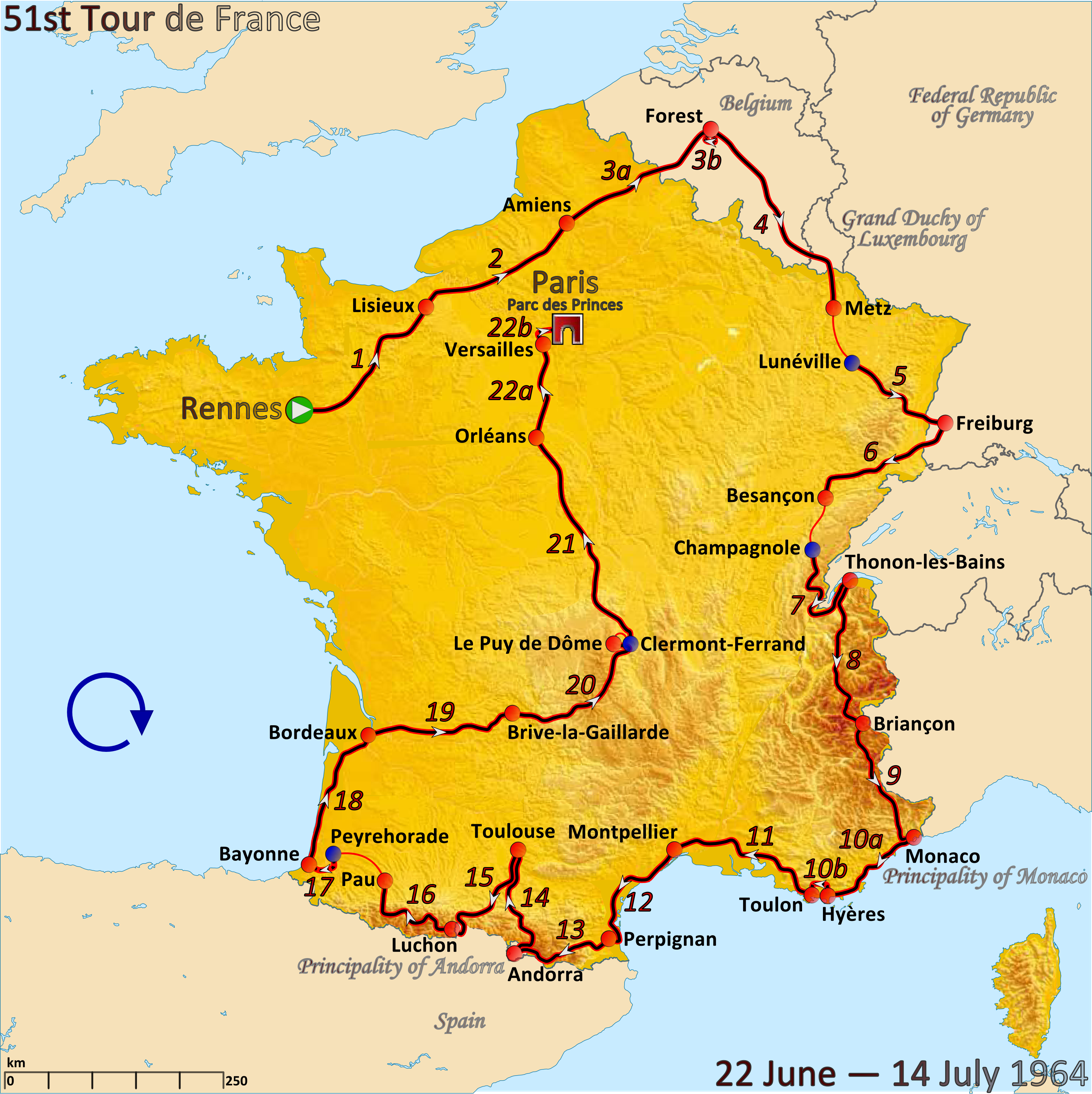
Route of the 1964 Tour de France

The 1964 Tour de France was the 51st edition of Tour de France, one of cycling's Grand Tours. The Tour began in Rennes with a flat stage on 22 June and Stage 12 occurred on 3 July with a flat stage from Montpellier. The race finished in Paris on 14 July.

== Stage 12 ==
3 July 1964 - Montpellier to Perpignan, 174 km (108.1 mi)

Stage 12 result

Rank	Rider	Team	Time
1	Jo de Roo (NED)	Saint-Raphaël–Gitane–Dunlop	4h 44' 20"
2	Guy Epaud (FRA)	Pelforth–Sauvage–Lejeune	+ 1"
3	Henk Nijdam (NED)	Televizier	+ 3"
4	Mario Minieri (ITA)	Salvarani	s.t.
5	Barry Hoban (GBR)	Mercier–BP–Hutchinson	+ 6"
6	Jean Graczyk (FRA)	Margnat–Paloma–Dunlop	s.t.
7	Edward Sels (BEL)	Solo–Superia	s.t.
8	Arthur Decabooter (BEL)	Solo–Superia	s.t.
9	José Segú (ESP)	Margnat–Paloma–Dunlop	s.t.
10	Michael Wright (GBR)	Wiel's–Groene Leeuw	s.t.

General classification after stage 12

Rank	Rider	Team	Time
1	Georges Groussard (FRA)	Pelforth–Sauvage–Lejeune	72h 04' 56"
2	Jacques Anquetil (FRA)	Saint-Raphaël–Gitane–Dunlop	+ 1' 11"
3	Raymond Poulidor (FRA)	Mercier–BP–Hutchinson	+ 1' 42"
4	Federico Bahamontes (ESP)	Margnat–Paloma–Dunlop	+ 3' 04"
5	Henry Anglade (FRA)	Pelforth–Sauvage–Lejeune	+ 3' 05"
6	Rudi Altig (FRG)	Saint-Raphaël–Gitane–Dunlop	+ 4' 00"
7	André Foucher (FRA)	Pelforth–Sauvage–Lejeune	+ 4' 16"
8	Hans Junkermann (FRG)	Wiel's–Groene Leeuw	+ 5' 16"
9	Tom Simpson (GBR)	Peugeot–BP–Englebert	+ 5' 24"
10	Gilbert Desmet (BEL)	Wiel's–Groene Leeuw	+ 5' 58"

== Stage 13 ==
4 July 1964 - Perpignan to Andorra, 170 km (110 mi)

Stage 13 result

Rank	Rider	Team	Time
1	Julio Jiménez (ESP)	Kas–Kaskol	4h 54' 53"
2	Benoni Beheyt (BEL)	Wiel's–Groene Leeuw	+ 8' 52"
3	José Segú (ESP)	Margnat–Paloma–Dunlop	s.t.
4	Raymond Poulidor (FRA)	Mercier–BP–Hutchinson	s.t.
5	Rudi Altig (FRG)	Saint-Raphaël–Gitane–Dunlop	s.t.
6	Gilbert Desmet (BEL)	Wiel's–Groene Leeuw	s.t.
7	André Foucher (FRA)	Pelforth–Sauvage–Lejeune	s.t.
8	Jacques Anquetil (FRA)	Saint-Raphaël–Gitane–Dunlop	s.t.
9	Sebastián Elorza (ESP)	Kas–Kaskol	s.t.
10	Tom Simpson (GBR)	Peugeot–BP–Englebert	s.t.

General classification after stage 13

Rank	Rider	Team	Time
1	Georges Groussard (FRA)	Pelforth–Sauvage–Lejeune	77h 08' 41"
2	Jacques Anquetil (FRA)	Saint-Raphaël–Gitane–Dunlop	+ 1' 11"
3	Raymond Poulidor (FRA)	Mercier–BP–Hutchinson	+ 1' 42"
4	Henry Anglade (FRA)	Pelforth–Sauvage–Lejeune	+ 3' 05"
5	Federico Bahamontes (ESP)	Margnat–Paloma–Dunlop	+ 3' 05"
6	Rudi Altig (FRG)	Saint-Raphaël–Gitane–Dunlop	+ 4' 00"
7	André Foucher (FRA)	Pelforth–Sauvage–Lejeune	+ 4' 16"
8	Julio Jiménez (ESP)	Kas–Kaskol	+ 5' 03"
9	Hans Junkermann (FRG)	Wiel's–Groene Leeuw	+ 5' 16"
10	Tom Simpson (GBR)	Peugeot–BP–Englebert	+ 5' 24"

== Rest Day ==
5 July 1964 - Andorra

== Stage 14 ==
6 July 1964 - Andorra to Toulouse, 186 km (116 mi)

Stage 14 result

Rank	Rider	Team	Time
1	Edward Sels (BEL)	Solo–Superia	4h 36' 56"
2	Gilbert Desmet (BEL)	Wiel's–Groene Leeuw	s.t.
3	Vittorio Adorni (ITA)	Salvarani	s.t.
4	Luis Otaño (ESP)	Ferrys	s.t.
5	Antonio Barrutia (ESP)	Kas–Kaskol	s.t.
6	Arnaldo Pambianco (ITA)	Salvarani	s.t.
7	Sebastián Elorza (ESP)	Kas–Kaskol	s.t.
8	Francisco Gabica (ESP)	Kas–Kaskol	s.t.
9	Willy Monty (BEL)	Pelforth–Sauvage–Lejeune	s.t.
10	Fernando Manzaneque (ESP)	Ferrys	s.t.

General classification after stage 14

Rank	Rider	Team	Time
1	Georges Groussard (FRA)	Pelforth–Sauvage–Lejeune	81h 45' 37"
2	Jacques Anquetil (FRA)	Saint-Raphaël–Gitane–Dunlop	+ 1' 26"
3	Henry Anglade (FRA)	Pelforth–Sauvage–Lejeune	+ 3' 05"
4	Federico Bahamontes (ESP)	Margnat–Paloma–Dunlop	+ 3' 11"
5	André Foucher (FRA)	Pelforth–Sauvage–Lejeune	+ 4' 16"
6	Raymond Poulidor (FRA)	Mercier–BP–Hutchinson	+ 4' 28"
7	Julio Jiménez (ESP)	Kas–Kaskol	+ 5' 03"
8	Hans Junkermann (FRG)	Wiel's–Groene Leeuw	+ 5' 16"
9	Gilbert Desmet (BEL)	Wiel's–Groene Leeuw	+ 5' 28"
10	Rudi Altig (FRG)	Saint-Raphaël–Gitane–Dunlop	+ 6' 36"

== Stage 15 ==
7 July 1964 - Toulouse to Luchon, 203 km (126 mi)

Stage 15 result

Rank	Rider	Team	Time
1	Raymond Poulidor (FRA)	Mercier–BP–Hutchinson	6h 07' 55"
2	Francisco Gabica (ESP)	Kas–Kaskol	+ 1' 09"
3	Gilbert Desmet (BEL)	Wiel's–Groene Leeuw	+ 1' 43"
4	Jan Janssen (NED)	Pelforth–Sauvage–Lejeune	s.t.
5	Henry Anglade (FRA)	Pelforth–Sauvage–Lejeune	s.t.
6	Vittorio Adorni (ITA)	Salvarani	s.t.
7	Hans Junkermann (FRG)	Wiel's–Groene Leeuw	s.t.
8	Jacques Anquetil (FRA)	Saint-Raphaël–Gitane–Dunlop	s.t.
9	Sebastián Elorza (ESP)	Kas–Kaskol	s.t.
10	André Foucher (FRA)	Pelforth–Sauvage–Lejeune	s.t.

General classification after stage 15

Rank	Rider	Team	Time
1	Georges Groussard (FRA)	Pelforth–Sauvage–Lejeune	87h 55' 15"
2	Jacques Anquetil (FRA)	Saint-Raphaël–Gitane–Dunlop	+ 1' 26"
3	Raymond Poulidor (FRA)	Mercier–BP–Hutchinson	+ 1' 35"
4	Henry Anglade (FRA)	Pelforth–Sauvage–Lejeune	+ 3' 05"
5	Federico Bahamontes (ESP)	Margnat–Paloma–Dunlop	+ 3' 29"
6	André Foucher (FRA)	Pelforth–Sauvage–Lejeune	+ 4' 16"
7	Hans Junkermann (FRG)	Wiel's–Groene Leeuw	+ 5' 16"
8	Julio Jiménez (ESP)	Kas–Kaskol	+ 5' 21"
9	Gilbert Desmet (BEL)	Wiel's–Groene Leeuw	+ 5' 28"
10	Tom Simpson (GBR)	Peugeot–BP–Englebert	+ 8' 17"

== Stage 16 ==
8 July 1964 - Luchon to Pau, 197 km (122 mi)

Stage 16 result

Rank	Rider	Team	Time
1	Federico Bahamontes (ESP)	Margnat–Paloma–Dunlop	6h 18' 47"
2	Jan Janssen (NED)	Pelforth–Sauvage–Lejeune	+ 1' 54"
3	Gilbert Desmet (BEL)	Wiel's–Groene Leeuw	+ 1' 43"
4	Hans Junkermann (FRG)	Wiel's–Groene Leeuw	s.t.
5	Francisco Gabica (ESP)	Kas–Kaskol	s.t.
6	Vittorio Adorni (ITA)	Salvarani	s.t.
7	Karl-Heinz Kunde (FRG)	Wiel's–Groene Leeuw	s.t.
8	Jacques Anquetil (FRA)	Saint-Raphaël–Gitane–Dunlop	s.t.
9	Raymond Poulidor (FRA)	Mercier–BP–Hutchinson	s.t.
10	Esteban Martín (ESP)	Margnat–Paloma–Dunlop	s.t.

General classification after stage 16

Rank	Rider	Team	Time
1	Georges Groussard (FRA)	Pelforth–Sauvage–Lejeune	94h 15' 56"
2	Federico Bahamontes (ESP)	Margnat–Paloma–Dunlop	+ 35"
3	Jacques Anquetil (FRA)	Saint-Raphaël–Gitane–Dunlop	+ 1' 26"
4	Raymond Poulidor (FRA)	Mercier–BP–Hutchinson	+ 1' 35"
5	Henry Anglade (FRA)	Pelforth–Sauvage–Lejeune	+ 3' 05"
6	André Foucher (FRA)	Pelforth–Sauvage–Lejeune	+ 4' 16"
7	Hans Junkermann (FRG)	Wiel's–Groene Leeuw	+ 5' 16"
8	Julio Jiménez (ESP)	Kas–Kaskol	+ 5' 21"
9	Gilbert Desmet (BEL)	Wiel's–Groene Leeuw	+ 5' 28"
10	Vittorio Adorni (ITA)	Salvarani	+ 11' 13"

== Stage 17 ==
9 July 1964 - Peyrehorade to Bayonne, 43 km (27 mi) (ITT)

Stage 17 result

Rank	Rider	Team	Time
1	Jacques Anquetil (FRA)	Saint-Raphaël–Gitane–Dunlop	1h 01' 53"
2	Raymond Poulidor (FRA)	Mercier–BP–Hutchinson	+ 37"
3	Rudi Altig (FRG)	Saint-Raphaël–Gitane–Dunlop	+ 1' 19"
4	Henry Anglade (FRA)	Pelforth–Sauvage–Lejeune	+ 2' 02"
5	Vittorio Adorni (ITA)	Salvarani	+ 2' 43"
6	Francisco Gabica (ESP)	Kas–Kaskol	+ 2' 44"
7	Camille Le Menn (FRA)	Peugeot–BP–Englebert	+ 2' 55"
8	Gilbert Desmet (BEL)	Wiel's–Groene Leeuw	+3' 24"
9	Albertus Geldermans (FRA)	Saint-Raphaël–Gitane–Dunlop	+ 3' 41"
10	Barry Hoban (GBR)	Mercier–BP–Hutchinson	+ 3' 51"

General classification after stage 17

Rank	Rider	Team	Time
1	Jacques Anquetil (FRA)	Saint-Raphaël–Gitane–Dunlop	95h 18' 55"
2	Raymond Poulidor (FRA)	Mercier–BP–Hutchinson	+ 56"
3	Federico Bahamontes (ESP)	Margnat–Paloma–Dunlop	+ 3' 31"
4	Henry Anglade (FRA)	Pelforth–Sauvage–Lejeune	+ 4' 01"
5	Georges Groussard (FRA)	Pelforth–Sauvage–Lejeune	+ 4' 53"
6	André Foucher (FRA)	Pelforth–Sauvage–Lejeune	+ 7' 30"
7	Gilbert Desmet (BEL)	Wiel's–Groene Leeuw	+ 7' 46"
8	Hans Junkermann (FRG)	Wiel's–Groene Leeuw	+ 9' 02"
9	Julio Jiménez (ESP)	Kas–Kaskol	+ 11' 10"
10	Vittorio Adorni (ITA)	Salvarani	+ 12' 50"

== Stage 18 ==
10 July 1964 - Bayonne to Bordeaux, 187 km (116 mi)

Finishing times recorded at the entrance to the Bordeaux velodrome.

Stage 18 result

Rank	Rider	Team	Time
1	André Darrigade (FRA)	Margnat–Paloma–Dunlop	5h 05' 12"
2	Barry Hoban (GBR)	Mercier–BP–Hutchinson	s.t.
3	Edward Sels (BEL)	Solo–Superia	s.t.
4	Benoni Beheyt (BEL)	Wiel's–Groene Leeuw	s.t.
5	Michel Van Aerde (BEL)	Solo–Superia	s.t.
6	Jan Janssen (NED)	Pelforth–Sauvage–Lejeune	s.t.
7	Henk Nijdam (NED)	Televizier	s.t.
8	Bruno Fantinato (ITA)	Salvarani	s.t.
9	Edgard Sorgeloos (BEL)	Solo–Superia	s.t.
10	Mario Minieri (ITA)	Salvarani	s.t.

General classification after stage 18

Rank	Rider	Team	Time
1	Jacques Anquetil (FRA)	Saint-Raphaël–Gitane–Dunlop	100h 24' 07"
2	Raymond Poulidor (FRA)	Mercier–BP–Hutchinson	+ 56"
3	Federico Bahamontes (ESP)	Margnat–Paloma–Dunlop	+ 3' 31"
4	Henry Anglade (FRA)	Pelforth–Sauvage–Lejeune	+ 4' 01"
5	Georges Groussard (FRA)	Pelforth–Sauvage–Lejeune	+ 4' 53"
6	André Foucher (FRA)	Pelforth–Sauvage–Lejeune	+ 7' 30"
7	Gilbert Desmet (BEL)	Wiel's–Groene Leeuw	+ 7' 43"
8	Hans Junkermann (FRG)	Wiel's–Groene Leeuw	+ 9' 02"
9	Julio Jiménez (ESP)	Kas–Kaskol	+ 11' 10"
10	Vittorio Adorni (ITA)	Salvarani	+ 12' 50"

== Stage 19 ==
11 July 1964 - Bordeaux to Brive, 215 km (134 mi)

Stage 19 result

Rank	Rider	Team	Time
1	Edward Sels (BEL)	Solo–Superia	5h 50' 30"
2	Mario Minieri (ITA)	Salvarani	+ 1"
3	Frans Aerenhouts (BEL)	Mercier–BP–Hutchinson	+ 2"
4	Henk Nijdam (NED)	Televizier	+ 4"
5	José Segú (ESP)	Margnat–Paloma–Dunlop	s.t.
6	Rudi Altig (FRG)	Saint-Raphaël–Gitane–Dunlop	s.t.
7	Edgard Sorgeloos (BEL)	Solo–Superia	s.t.
8	Gilbert Desmet (BEL)	Wiel's–Groene Leeuw	s.t.
9	Jo de Roo (NED)	Saint-Raphaël–Gitane–Dunlop	s.t.
10	Jean Gainche (FRA)	Mercier–BP–Hutchinson	s.t.

General classification after stage 19

Rank	Rider	Team	Time
1	Jacques Anquetil (FRA)	Saint-Raphaël–Gitane–Dunlop	106h 14' 41"
2	Raymond Poulidor (FRA)	Mercier–BP–Hutchinson	+ 56"
3	Federico Bahamontes (ESP)	Margnat–Paloma–Dunlop	+ 3' 31"
4	Henry Anglade (FRA)	Pelforth–Sauvage–Lejeune	+ 4' 01"
5	Georges Groussard (FRA)	Pelforth–Sauvage–Lejeune	+ 4' 53"
6	André Foucher (FRA)	Pelforth–Sauvage–Lejeune	+ 7' 30"
7	Gilbert Desmet (BEL)	Wiel's–Groene Leeuw	+ 7' 43"
8	Hans Junkermann (FRG)	Wiel's–Groene Leeuw	+ 9' 02"
9	Julio Jiménez (ESP)	Kas–Kaskol	+ 11' 10"
10	Vittorio Adorni (ITA)	Salvarani	+ 12' 50"

== Stage 20 ==
12 July 1964 - Brive to Puy de Dôme, 217 km (135 mi)

Stage 20 result

Rank	Rider	Team	Time
1	Julio Jiménez (ESP)	Kas–Kaskol	7h 09' 33"
2	Federico Bahamontes (ESP)	Margnat–Paloma–Dunlop	+ 11"
3	Raymond Poulidor (FRA)	Mercier–BP–Hutchinson	+ 57"
4	Vittorio Adorni (ITA)	Salvarani	+ 1' 30"
5	Jacques Anquetil (FRA)	Saint-Raphaël–Gitane–Dunlop	+ 1' 39"
6	Henry Anglade (FRA)	Pelforth–Sauvage–Lejeune	+ 1' 59"
7	André Foucher (FRA)	Pelforth–Sauvage–Lejeune	+ 2' 04"
8	Francisco Gabica (ESP)	Kas–Kaskol	+ 2' 32"
9	Fernando Manzaneque (ESP)	Ferrys	+ 2' 46"
10	Jan Janssen (NED)	Pelforth–Sauvage–Lejeune	+ 3' 22"

General classification after stage 20

Rank	Rider	Team	Time
1	Jacques Anquetil (FRA)	Saint-Raphaël–Gitane–Dunlop	113h 25' 53"
2	Raymond Poulidor (FRA)	Mercier–BP–Hutchinson	+ 14"
3	Federico Bahamontes (ESP)	Margnat–Paloma–Dunlop	+ 1' 33"
4	Henry Anglade (FRA)	Pelforth–Sauvage–Lejeune	+ 4' 21"
5	Georges Groussard (FRA)	Pelforth–Sauvage–Lejeune	+ 6' 49"
6	André Foucher (FRA)	Pelforth–Sauvage–Lejeune	+ 7' 55"
7	Julio Jiménez (ESP)	Kas–Kaskol	+ 8' 31"
8	Gilbert Desmet (BEL)	Wiel's–Groene Leeuw	+ 10' 25"
9	Hans Junkermann (FRG)	Wiel's–Groene Leeuw	+ 10' 49"
10	Vittorio Adorni (ITA)	Salvarani	+ 14' 41"

== Stage 21 ==
13 July 1964 - Clermont-Ferrand to Orléans, 311 km (193 mi)

Stage 21 result

Rank	Rider	Team	Time
1	Jean Stablinski (FRA)	Saint-Raphaël–Gitane–Dunlop	9h 29' 33"
2	Battista Babini (ITA)	Salvarani	+ 1"
3	Hubert Ferrer (FRA)	Pelforth–Sauvage–Lejeune	s.t.
4	Joseph Novales (FRA)	Margnat–Paloma–Dunlop	s.t.
5	Gilbert De Smet (BEL)	Wiel's–Groene Leeuw	s.t.
6	Salvador Honrubia (ESP)	Ferrys	s.t.
7	Edward Sels (BEL)	Solo–Superia	+ 9' 37"
8	Jan Janssen (NED)	Pelforth–Sauvage–Lejeune	s.t.
9	Benoni Beheyt (BEL)	Wiel's–Groene Leeuw	s.t.
10	Mario Minieri (ITA)	Salvarani	s.t.

General classification after stage 21

Rank	Rider	Team	Time
1	Jacques Anquetil (FRA)	Saint-Raphaël–Gitane–Dunlop	123h 05' 03"
2	Raymond Poulidor (FRA)	Mercier–BP–Hutchinson	+ 14"
3	Federico Bahamontes (ESP)	Margnat–Paloma–Dunlop	+ 1' 33"
4	Henry Anglade (FRA)	Pelforth–Sauvage–Lejeune	+ 4' 21"
5	Georges Groussard (FRA)	Pelforth–Sauvage–Lejeune	+ 6' 49"
6	André Foucher (FRA)	Pelforth–Sauvage–Lejeune	+ 7' 55"
7	Julio Jiménez (ESP)	Kas–Kaskol	+ 8' 31"
8	Gilbert Desmet (BEL)	Wiel's–Groene Leeuw	+ 10' 25"
9	Hans Junkermann (FRG)	Wiel's–Groene Leeuw	+ 10' 49"
10	Vittorio Adorni (ITA)	Salvarani	+ 12' 41"

== Stage 22a ==
14 July 1964 - Orléans to Versailles, 119 km (74 mi)

Stage 22a result

Rank	Rider	Team	Time
1	Benoni Beheyt (BEL)	Wiel's–Groene Leeuw	3h 25' 24"
2	Edward Sels (BEL)	Solo–Superia	+ 7"
3	Jan Janssen (NED)	Pelforth–Sauvage–Lejeune	s.t.
4	Rudi Altig (FRG)	Saint-Raphaël–Gitane–Dunlop	s.t.
5	Jo de Roo (NED)	Saint-Raphaël–Gitane–Dunlop	s.t.
6	André Darrigade (FRA)	Margnat–Paloma–Dunlop	s.t.
7	Henk Nijdam (NED)	Televizier	s.t.
8	Tom Simpson (GBR)	Peugeot–BP–Englebert	s.t.
9	Gilbert De Smet (BEL)	Wiel's–Groene Leeuw	s.t.
10	Victor Van Schil (BEL)	Mercier–BP–Hutchinson	s.t.

General classification after stage 22a

Rank	Rider	Team	Time
1	Jacques Anquetil (FRA)	Saint-Raphaël–Gitane–Dunlop	126h 32' 54"
2	Raymond Poulidor (FRA)	Mercier–BP–Hutchinson	+ 14"
3	Federico Bahamontes (ESP)	Margnat–Paloma–Dunlop	+ 1' 33"
4	Henry Anglade (FRA)	Pelforth–Sauvage–Lejeune	+ 4' 21"
5	Georges Groussard (FRA)	Pelforth–Sauvage–Lejeune	+ 6' 49"
6	André Foucher (FRA)	Pelforth–Sauvage–Lejeune	+ 7' 55"
7	Julio Jiménez (ESP)	Kas–Kaskol	+ 8' 31"
8	Gilbert Desmet (BEL)	Wiel's–Groene Leeuw	+ 10' 25"
9	Hans Junkermann (FRG)	Wiel's–Groene Leeuw	+ 10' 49"
10	Vittorio Adorni (ITA)	Salvarani	+ 12' 41"

== Stage 22b ==
14 July 1964 - Versailles to Paris, 27 km (17 mi) (ITT)

Stage 22b result

Rank	Rider	Team	Time
1	Jacques Anquetil (FRA)	Saint-Raphaël–Gitane–Dunlop	37' 10"
2	Rudi Altig (FRG)	Saint-Raphaël–Gitane–Dunlop	+ 15"
3	Raymond Poulidor (FRA)	Mercier–BP–Hutchinson	+ 21"
4	Vittorio Adorni (ITA)	Salvarani	+ 1' 18"
5	Gilbert Desmet (BEL)	Wiel's–Groene Leeuw	+ 1' 32"
6	Francisco Gabica (ESP)	Kas–Kaskol	+ 1' 44"
7	Henry Anglade (FRA)	Pelforth–Sauvage–Lejeune	+ 2' 01"
8	Albertus Geldermans (FRA)	Saint-Raphaël–Gitane–Dunlop	+ 2' 06"
9	Camille Le Menn (FRA)	Peugeot–BP–Englebert	+ 2' 15"
10	André Foucher (FRA)	Pelforth–Sauvage–Lejeune	+ 2' 21"

General classification after stage 22b

Rank	Rider	Team	Time
1	Jacques Anquetil (FRA)	Saint-Raphaël–Gitane–Dunlop	127h 09' 44"
2	Raymond Poulidor (FRA)	Mercier–BP–Hutchinson	+ 55"
3	Federico Bahamontes (ESP)	Margnat–Paloma–Dunlop	+ 4' 44"
4	Henry Anglade (FRA)	Pelforth–Sauvage–Lejeune	+ 6' 42"
5	Georges Groussard (FRA)	Pelforth–Sauvage–Lejeune	+ 10' 34"
6	André Foucher (FRA)	Pelforth–Sauvage–Lejeune	+ 10' 36"
7	Julio Jiménez (ESP)	Kas–Kaskol	+ 12' 13"
8	Gilbert Desmet (BEL)	Wiel's–Groene Leeuw	+ 12' 17"
9	Hans Junkermann (FRG)	Wiel's–Groene Leeuw	+ 14' 02"
10	Vittorio Adorni (ITA)	Salvarani	+ 14' 19"
