= 1964 Tour de France, Stage 1 to Stage 11 =

Cycling race stages

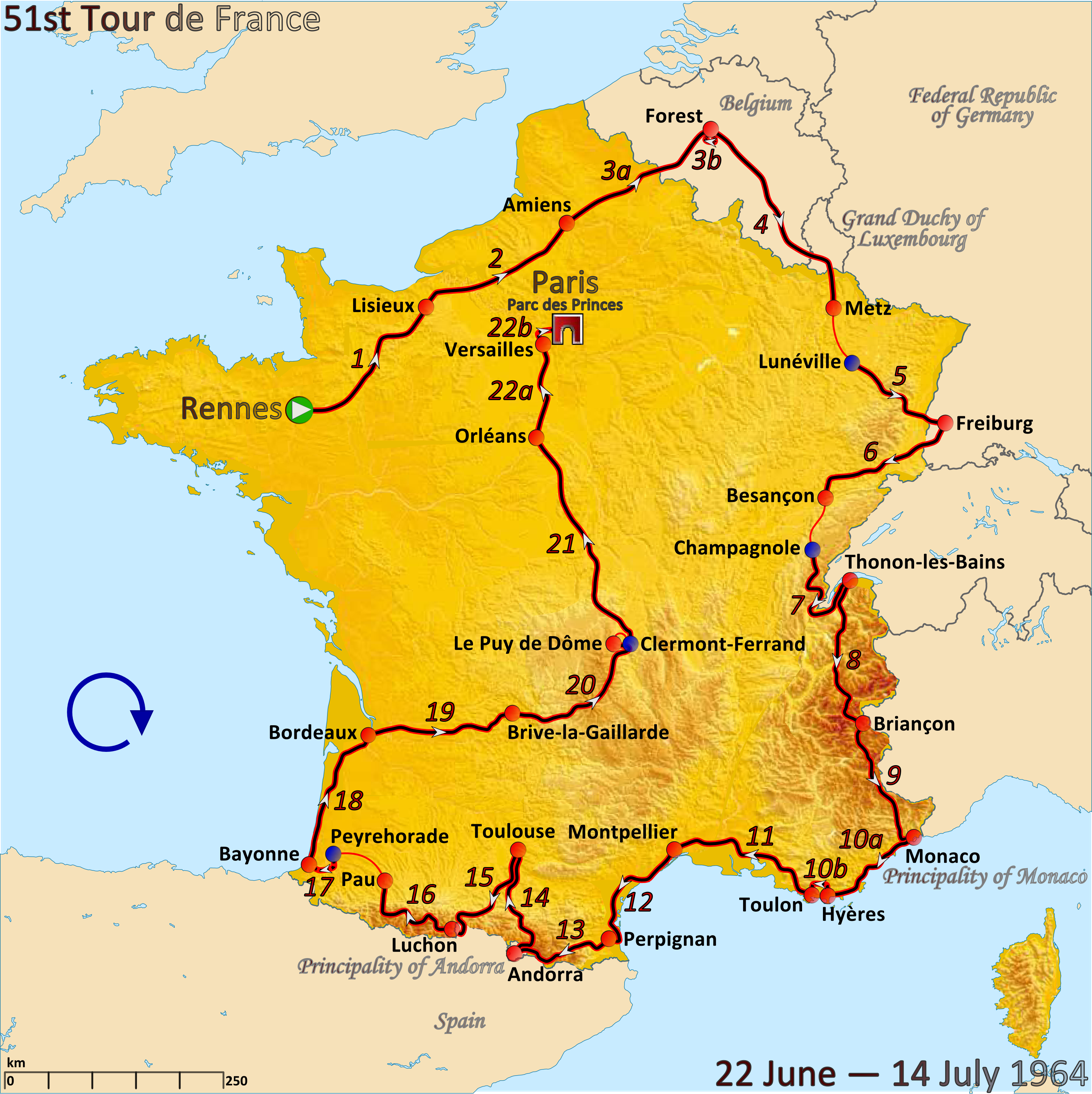
Route of the 1964 Tour de France

The 1964 Tour de France was the 51st edition of Tour de France, one of cycling's Grand Tours. The Tour began in Rennes with a flat stage on 22 June and Stage 11 occurred on 2 July with a flat stage to Montpellier. The race finished in Paris on 14 July.

== Stage 1 ==
22 June 1964 - Rennes to Lisieux, 215 km (133.6 mi)

Stage 1 result and General Classification after Stage 1

	Rider	Team	Time
1	Edward Sels (BEL)	Solo–Superia	5h 14' 57"
2	Michael Wright (GBR)	Wiel's–Groene Leeuw	s.t.
3	Benoni Beheyt (BEL)	Wiel's–Groene Leeuw	s.t.
4	Willy Bocklant (BEL)	Flandria–Romeo	s.t.
5	Rudi Altig (FRG)	Saint-Raphaël–Gitane–Dunlop	s.t.
6	Jo de Roo (NED)	Saint-Raphaël–Gitane–Dunlop	s.t.
7	Jan Janssen (NED)	Pelforth–Sauvage–Lejeune	s.t.
8	Jean Graczyk (FRA)	Margnat–Paloma–Dunlop	s.t.
9	Frans Melckenbeeck (BEL)	Mercier–BP–Hutchinson	s.t.
10	Emile Daems (BEL)	Peugeot–BP–Englebert	s.t.

== Stage 2 ==
23 June 1964 - Lisieux to Amiens, 208 km (129.2 mi)

Stage 2 result

Rank	Rider	Team	Time
1	André Darrigade (FRA)	Margnat–Paloma–Dunlop	5h 07' 47"
2	Jan Janssen (NED)	Pelforth–Sauvage–Lejeune	s.t.
3	Vito Taccone (ITA)	Salvarani	s.t.
4	Willy Bocklant (BEL)	Flandria–Romeo	s.t.
5	Rudi Altig (FRG)	Saint-Raphaël–Gitane–Dunlop	s.t.
6	Frans Melckenbeeck (BEL)	Mercier–BP–Hutchinson	s.t.
7	André van Aert (NED)	Televizier	s.t.
8	Frans Verbeeck (BEL)	Wiel's–Groene Leeuw	s.t.
9	Michael Wright (GBR)	Wiel's–Groene Leeuw	s.t.
10	Gilbert Desmet (BEL)	Wiel's–Groene Leeuw	s.t.

General classification after stage 2

Rank	Rider	Team	Time
1	Edward Sels (BEL)	Solo–Superia	10h 21' 44"
2	André Darrigade (FRA)	Margnat–Paloma–Dunlop	s.t.
3	Jan Janssen (NED)	Pelforth–Sauvage–Lejeune	+ 30"
4	Michael Wright (GBR)	Wiel's–Groene Leeuw	s.t.
5	Willy Bocklant (BEL)	Flandria–Romeo	+ 1' 00"
6	Rudi Altig (FRG)	Saint-Raphaël–Gitane–Dunlop	s.t.
7	Vito Taccone (ITA)	Salvarani	s.t.
8	Benoni Beheyt (BEL)	Wiel's–Groene Leeuw	s.t.
9	Frans Melckenbeeck (BEL)	Mercier–BP–Hutchinson	s.t.
10	Frans Verbeeck (BEL)	Wiel's–Groene Leeuw	s.t.

== Stage 3a ==
24 June 1964 - Amiens to Forest, 197 km (122 mi)

Stage 3a result

Rank	Rider	Team	Time
1	Bernard Van de Kerckhove (BEL)	Solo–Superia	5h 07' 32"
2	Jean Stablinski (FRA)	Saint-Raphaël–Gitane–Dunlop	s.t.
3	Gilbert Desmet (BEL)	Wiel's–Groene Leeuw	+ 3"
4	Jean Anastasi (FRA)	Margnat–Paloma–Dunlop	+ 5"
5	Edward Sels (BEL)	Solo–Superia	+ 19"
6	Willy Bocklant (BEL)	Flandria–Romeo	s.t.
7	Jan Janssen (NED)	Pelforth–Sauvage–Lejeune	s.t.
8	Rudi Altig (FRG)	Saint-Raphaël–Gitane–Dunlop	s.t.
9	Arthur Decabooter (BEL)	Solo–Superia	s.t.
10	Jo de Roo (NED)	Saint-Raphaël–Gitane–Dunlop	s.t.

General classification after stage 3a

Rank	Rider	Team	Time
1	Bernard Van de Kerckhove (BEL)	Solo–Superia	15h 29' 16"
2	Edward Sels (BEL)	Solo–Superia	+ 19"
3	André Darrigade (FRA)	Margnat–Paloma–Dunlop	s.t.
4	Jan Janssen (NED)	Pelforth–Sauvage–Lejeune	+ 49"
5	Michael Wright (GBR)	Wiel's–Groene Leeuw	s.t.
6	Jean Stablinski (FRA)	Saint-Raphaël–Gitane–Dunlop	s.t.
7	Gilbert Desmet (BEL)	Wiel's–Groene Leeuw	+ 1' 03"
8	Benoni Beheyt (BEL)	Wiel's–Groene Leeuw	s.t.
9	Willy Bocklant (BEL)	Flandria–Romeo	+ 1' 19"
10	Rudi Altig (FRG)	Saint-Raphaël–Gitane–Dunlop	s.t.

== Stage 3b ==
24 June 1964 - Forest, 21 km (13 mi) (TTT)

Stage 3b result

Rank	Team	Time
1	Kas–Kaskol	1h 34' 05"
2	Pelforth–Sauvage–Lejeune	+ 8"
3	Wiel's–Groene Leeuw	+ 21"
4	Solo–Superia	+ 43"
5	Ferrys	+ 1' 17"
6	Mercier–BP–Hutchinson	+ 1' 25"
7	Peugeot–BP–Englebert	+ 1' 37"
8	Saint-Raphaël–Gitane–Dunlop	+ 1' 43"
9	Salvarani	+ 2' 41"
10	Margnat–Paloma–Dunlop	+ 3' 49"

General classification after stage 3b

Rank	Rider	Team	Time
1	Bernard Van de Kerckhove (BEL)	Solo–Superia	16h 00' 52"
2	Edward Sels (BEL)	Solo–Superia	+ 19"
3	Jan Janssen (NED)	Pelforth–Sauvage–Lejeune	+ 39"
4	Michael Wright (GBR)	Wiel's–Groene Leeuw	+ 42"
5	Gilbert Desmet (BEL)	Wiel's–Groene Leeuw	+ 55"
6	José Antonio Momeñe (ESP)	Kas–Kaskol	+ 1' 04"
7	Francisco Gabica (ESP)	Kas–Kaskol	s.t.
8	Henry Anglade (FRA)	Pelforth–Sauvage–Lejeune	s.t.
9	Carlos Echeverría (ESP)	Kas–Kaskol	+ 1' 06"
10	François Mahé (FRA)	Pelforth–Sauvage–Lejeune	+ 1' 09"

== Stage 4 ==
25 June 1964 - Forest to Metz, 292 km (181 mi)

Stage 4 result

Rank	Rider	Team	Time
1	Rudi Altig (FRG)	Saint-Raphaël–Gitane–Dunlop	8h 26' 00"
2	Henk Nijdam (NED)	Televizier	s.t.
3	Jan Janssen (NED)	Pelforth–Sauvage–Lejeune	s.t.
4	Armand Desmet (BEL)	Solo–Superia	s.t.
5	Henry Anglade (FRA)	Pelforth–Sauvage–Lejeune	s.t.
6	Fernando Manzaneque (ESP)	Ferrys	+ 4' 02"
7	Edward Sels (BEL)	Solo–Superia	+ 8"
8	André Darrigade (FRA)	Margnat–Paloma–Dunlop	s.t.
9	Frans Verbeeck (BEL)	Wiel's–Groene Leeuw	s.t.
10	Frans Aerenhouts (BEL)	Mercier–BP–Hutchinson	s.t.

General classification after stage 4

Rank	Rider	Team	Time
1	Bernard Van de Kerckhove (BEL)	Solo–Superia	24h 27' 00"
2	Edward Sels (BEL)	Solo–Superia	+ 19"
3	Rudi Altig (FRG)	Saint-Raphaël–Gitane–Dunlop	+ 31"
4	Jan Janssen (NED)	Pelforth–Sauvage–Lejeune	s.t.
5	Michael Wright (GBR)	Wiel's–Groene Leeuw	+ 42"
6	Gilbert Desmet (BEL)	Wiel's–Groene Leeuw	+ 55"
7	Henry Anglade (FRA)	Pelforth–Sauvage–Lejeune	+ 56"
8	José Antonio Momeñe (ESP)	Kas–Kaskol	+ 1' 04"
9	Francisco Gabica (ESP)	Kas–Kaskol	s.t.
10	Carlos Echeverría (ESP)	Kas–Kaskol	+ 1' 06"

== Stage 5 ==
26 June 1964 - Lunéville to Freiburg, 161 km (100 mi)

Stage 5 result

Rank	Rider	Team	Time
1	Willy Derboven (BEL)	Solo–Superia	4h 02' 51"
2	Rudi Altig (FRG)	Saint-Raphaël–Gitane–Dunlop	s.t.
3	Joaquim Galera (ESP)	Kas–Kaskol	s.t.
4	Joseph Groussard (FRA)	Pelforth–Sauvage–Lejeune	s.t.
5	Georges Groussard (FRA)	Pelforth–Sauvage–Lejeune	s.t.
6	Edward Sels (BEL)	Solo–Superia	+ 4' 02"
7	Vito Taccone (ITA)	Salvarani	s.t.
8	Gilbert Desmet (BEL)	Wiel's–Groene Leeuw	s.t.
9	André Darrigade (FRA)	Margnat–Paloma–Dunlop	s.t.
10	Frans Verbeeck (BEL)	Wiel's–Groene Leeuw	s.t.

General classification after stage 5

Rank	Rider	Team	Time
1	Rudi Altig (FRG)	Saint-Raphaël–Gitane–Dunlop	28h 29' 52"
2	Georges Groussard (FRA)	Pelforth–Sauvage–Lejeune	+ 1' 08"
3	Joaquim Galera (ESP)	Kas–Kaskol	+ 1' 29"
4	Joseph Groussard (FRA)	Pelforth–Sauvage–Lejeune	+ 3' 25"
5	Bernard Van de Kerckhove (BEL)	Solo–Superia	+ 4' 01"
6	Edward Sels (BEL)	Solo–Superia	+ 4' 20"
7	Jan Janssen (NED)	Pelforth–Sauvage–Lejeune	+ 4' 32"
8	Michael Wright (GBR)	Wiel's–Groene Leeuw	+ 4' 43"
9	Gilbert Desmet (BEL)	Wiel's–Groene Leeuw	+ 4' 56"
10	Henry Anglade (FRA)	Pelforth–Sauvage–Lejeune	+ 4' 57"

== Stage 6 ==
27 June 1964 - Freiburg to Besançon, 200 km (120 mi)

Stage 6 result

Rank	Rider	Team	Time
1	Henk Nijdam (NED)	Televizier	5h 05' 18"
2	Jo de Haan (NED)	Televizier	+ 11"
3	Jan Janssen (NED)	Pelforth–Sauvage–Lejeune	s.t.
4	Edward Sels (BEL)	Solo–Superia	s.t.
5	Arthur Decabooter (BEL)	Solo–Superia	s.t.
6	Bruno Fantinato (ITA)	Salvarani	s.t.
7	Vito Taccone (ITA)	Salvarani	s.t.
8	Frans Aerenhouts (BEL)	Mercier–BP–Hutchinson	s.t.
9	Benoni Beheyt (BEL)	Wiel's–Groene Leeuw	s.t.
10	Rik Wouters (NED)	Televizier	s.t.

General classification after stage 6

Rank	Rider	Team	Time
1	Rudi Altig (FRG)	Saint-Raphaël–Gitane–Dunlop	33h 35' 21"
2	Georges Groussard (FRA)	Pelforth–Sauvage–Lejeune	+ 1' 08"
3	Joaquim Galera (ESP)	Kas–Kaskol	+ 1' 29"
4	Joseph Groussard (FRA)	Pelforth–Sauvage–Lejeune	+ 3' 25"
5	Bernard Van de Kerckhove (BEL)	Solo–Superia	+ 4' 01"
6	Edward Sels (BEL)	Solo–Superia	+ 4' 20"
7	Jan Janssen (NED)	Pelforth–Sauvage–Lejeune	+ 4' 32"
8	Michael Wright (GBR)	Wiel's–Groene Leeuw	+ 4' 43"
9	Gilbert Desmet (BEL)	Wiel's–Groene Leeuw	+ 4' 56"
10	Henry Anglade (FRA)	Pelforth–Sauvage–Lejeune	+ 4' 57"

== Stage 7 ==
28 June 1964 - Besançon to Thonon-les-Bains, 195 km (121 mi)

Stage 7 result

Rank	Rider	Team	Time
1	Jan Janssen (NED)	Pelforth–Sauvage–Lejeune	5h 02' 14"
2	Willy Bocklant (BEL)	Flandria–Romeo	s.t.
3	Vin Denson (GBR)	Solo–Superia	s.t.
4	Henri Duez (FRA)	Peugeot–BP–Englebert	s.t.
5	Jos Hoevenaers (BEL)	Flandria–Romeo	s.t.
6	Eddy Pauwels (BEL)	Margnat–Paloma–Dunlop	s.t.
7	Arnaldo Pambianco (ITA)	Salvarani	s.t.
8	Raymond Poulidor (FRA)	Mercier–BP–Hutchinson	s.t.
9	Hans Junkermann (FRG)	Wiel's–Groene Leeuw	s.t.
10	Guy Epaud (FRA)	Pelforth–Sauvage–Lejeune	s.t.

General classification after stage 7

Rank	Rider	Team	Time
1	Rudi Altig (FRG)	Saint-Raphaël–Gitane–Dunlop	38h 38' 09"
2	Georges Groussard (FRA)	Pelforth–Sauvage–Lejeune	+ 34"
3	Joaquim Galera (ESP)	Kas–Kaskol	+ 1' 29"
4	Jan Janssen (NED)	Pelforth–Sauvage–Lejeune	+ 2' 58"
5	Bernard Van de Kerckhove (BEL)	Solo–Superia	+ 4' 01"
6	Edward Sels (BEL)	Solo–Superia	+ 4' 20"
7	Sebastián Elorza (ESP)	Kas–Kaskol	+ 4' 37"
8	André Foucher (FRA)	Pelforth–Sauvage–Lejeune	+ 4' 42"
9	Michael Wright (GBR)	Wiel's–Groene Leeuw	+ 4' 43"
10	Gilbert Desmet (BEL)	Wiel's–Groene Leeuw	+ 4' 56"

== Stage 8 ==
29 June 1964 - Thonon-les-Bains to Briançon, 249 km (155 mi)

Stage 8 result

Rank	Rider	Team	Time
1	Federico Bahamontes (ESP)	Margnat–Paloma–Dunlop	7h 20' 52"
2	Raymond Poulidor (FRA)	Mercier–BP–Hutchinson	+ 1' 32"
3	Hans Junkermann (FRG)	Wiel's–Groene Leeuw	+ 1' 33"
4	André Foucher (FRA)	Pelforth–Sauvage–Lejeune	s.t.
5	Henry Anglade (FRA)	Pelforth–Sauvage–Lejeune	s.t.
6	Georges Groussard (FRA)	Pelforth–Sauvage–Lejeune	s.t.
7	Jean-Claude Lebaube (FRA)	Saint-Raphaël–Gitane–Dunlop	+ 1' 36"
8	Jacques Anquetil (FRA)	Saint-Raphaël–Gitane–Dunlop	+ 1' 49"
9	Esteban Martín (ESP)	Margnat–Paloma–Dunlop	+ 2' 18"
10	Tom Simpson (GBR)	Peugeot–BP–Englebert	+ 2' 39"

General classification after stage 8

Rank	Rider	Team	Time
1	Georges Groussard (FRA)	Pelforth–Sauvage–Lejeune	46h 01' 08"
2	Federico Bahamontes (ESP)	Margnat–Paloma–Dunlop	+ 3' 35"
3	Raymond Poulidor (FRA)	Mercier–BP–Hutchinson	+ 4' 07"
4	André Foucher (FRA)	Pelforth–Sauvage–Lejeune	+ 4' 08"
5	Henry Anglade (FRA)	Pelforth–Sauvage–Lejeune	+ 4' 23"
6	Rudi Altig (FRG)	Saint-Raphaël–Gitane–Dunlop	+ 4' 38"
7	Hans Junkermann (FRG)	Wiel's–Groene Leeuw	+ 4' 47"
8	Jacques Anquetil (FRA)	Saint-Raphaël–Gitane–Dunlop	+ 5' 22"
9	Julio Jiménez (ESP)	Kas–Kaskol	+ 6' 03"
10	Tom Simpson (GBR)	Peugeot–BP–Englebert	+ 6' 10"

== Stage 9 ==
30 June 1964 - Briançon to Monaco, 239 km (149 mi)

Stage 9 result

Rank	Rider	Team	Time
1	Jacques Anquetil (FRA)	Saint-Raphaël–Gitane–Dunlop	7h 26' 59"
2	Tom Simpson (GBR)	Peugeot–BP–Englebert	s.t.
3	Gilbert Desmet (BEL)	Wiel's–Groene Leeuw	s.t.
4	André Foucher (FRA)	Pelforth–Sauvage–Lejeune	s.t.
5	Raymond Poulidor (FRA)	Mercier–BP–Hutchinson	s.t.
6	Eddy Pauwels (BEL)	Margnat–Paloma–Dunlop	s.t.
7	Vittorio Adorni (ITA)	Salvarani	s.t.
8	Claude Mattio (FRA)	Margnat–Paloma–Dunlop	s.t.
9	Battista Babini (ITA)	Salvarani	s.t.
10	Georges Groussard (FRA)	Pelforth–Sauvage–Lejeune	s.t.

General classification after stage 9

Rank	Rider	Team	Time
1	Georges Groussard (FRA)	Pelforth–Sauvage–Lejeune	53h 28' 07"
2	Federico Bahamontes (ESP)	Margnat–Paloma–Dunlop	+ 3' 35"
3	Raymond Poulidor (FRA)	Mercier–BP–Hutchinson	+ 4' 07"
4	André Foucher (FRA)	Pelforth–Sauvage–Lejeune	+ 4' 08"
5	Jacques Anquetil (FRA)	Saint-Raphaël–Gitane–Dunlop	+ 4' 22"
6	Henry Anglade (FRA)	Pelforth–Sauvage–Lejeune	+ 4' 23"
7	Hans Junkermann (FRG)	Wiel's–Groene Leeuw	+ 4' 47"
8	Tom Simpson (GBR)	Peugeot–BP–Englebert	+ 5' 40"
9	Jean-Claude Lebaube (FRA)	Saint-Raphaël–Gitane–Dunlop	+ 6' 17"
10	Esteban Martín (ESP)	Margnat–Paloma–Dunlop	+ 6' 53"

== Stage 10a ==
1 July 1964 - Monaco to Hyères, 187 km (116 mi)

Stage 10a result

Rank	Rider	Team	Time
1	Jan Janssen (NED)	Pelforth–Sauvage–Lejeune	5h 30' 58"
2	Rudi Altig (FRG)	Saint-Raphaël–Gitane–Dunlop	s.t.
3	Michael Wright (GBR)	Wiel's–Groene Leeuw	s.t.
4	Gilbert Desmet (BEL)	Wiel's–Groene Leeuw	s.t.
5	Henk Nijdam (NED)	Televizier	s.t.
6	Jean-Pierre Genet (BEL)	Mercier–BP–Hutchinson	s.t.
7	Guillaume Van Tongerloo (BEL)	Flandria–Romeo	+ 4"
8	Edward Sels (BEL)	Solo–Superia	+ 1' 02"
9	Bruno Fantinato (ITA)	Salvarani	s.t.
10	André Darrigade (FRA)	Margnat–Paloma–Dunlop	s.t.

General classification after stage 10a

Rank	Rider	Team	Time
1	Georges Groussard (FRA)	Pelforth–Sauvage–Lejeune	59h 00' 07"
2	Federico Bahamontes (ESP)	Margnat–Paloma–Dunlop	+ 3' 35"
3	Raymond Poulidor (FRA)	Mercier–BP–Hutchinson	+ 4' 07"
4	André Foucher (FRA)	Pelforth–Sauvage–Lejeune	+ 4' 08"
5	Jacques Anquetil (FRA)	Saint-Raphaël–Gitane–Dunlop	+ 4' 22"
6	Henry Anglade (FRA)	Pelforth–Sauvage–Lejeune	+ 4' 23"
7	Hans Junkermann (FRG)	Wiel's–Groene Leeuw	+ 4' 47"
8	Tom Simpson (GBR)	Peugeot–BP–Englebert	+ 5' 40"
9	Rudi Altig (FRG)	Saint-Raphaël–Gitane–Dunlop	+ 6' 09"
10	Jean-Claude Lebaube (FRA)	Saint-Raphaël–Gitane–Dunlop	+ 6' 17"

== Stage 10b ==
1 July 1964 - Hyères to Toulon, 21 km (13 mi) (ITT)

Stage 10b result

Rank	Rider	Team	Time
1	Jacques Anquetil (FRA)	Saint-Raphaël–Gitane–Dunlop	27' 52"
2	Raymond Poulidor (FRA)	Mercier–BP–Hutchinson	+ 36"
3	Rudi Altig (FRG)	Saint-Raphaël–Gitane–Dunlop	+ 54"
4	Ferdinand Bracke (BEL)	Peugeot–BP–Englebert	+ 1' 07"
5	Vittorio Adorni (ITA)	Salvarani	+ 1' 31"
6	Henry Anglade (FRA)	Pelforth–Sauvage–Lejeune	+ 1' 33"
7	Henk Nijdam (NED)	Televizier	+ 1' 36"
8	Francisco Gabica (ESP)	Kas–Kaskol	+ 1' 44"
9	Miguel Pacheco (ESP)	Ferrys	+ 1' 50"
10	Albertus Geldermans (FRA)	Saint-Raphaël–Gitane–Dunlop	+ 1' 57"

General classification after stage 10b

Rank	Rider	Team	Time
1	Georges Groussard (FRA)	Pelforth–Sauvage–Lejeune	59h 30' 50"
2	Jacques Anquetil (FRA)	Saint-Raphaël–Gitane–Dunlop	+ 1' 11"
3	Raymond Poulidor (FRA)	Mercier–BP–Hutchinson	+ 1' 42"
4	Federico Bahamontes (ESP)	Margnat–Paloma–Dunlop	+ 3' 04"
5	Henry Anglade (FRA)	Pelforth–Sauvage–Lejeune	+ 3' 05"
6	Rudi Altig (FRG)	Saint-Raphaël–Gitane–Dunlop	+ 4' 12"
7	André Foucher (FRA)	Pelforth–Sauvage–Lejeune	+ 4' 16"
8	Hans Junkermann (FRG)	Wiel's–Groene Leeuw	+ 5' 16"
9	Tom Simpson (GBR)	Peugeot–BP–Englebert	+ 5' 29"
10	Gilbert Desmet (BEL)	Wiel's–Groene Leeuw	+ 6' 03"

== Stage 11 ==
2 July 1964 - Toulon to Montpellier, 250 km (160 mi)

Stage 11 result

Rank	Rider	Team	Time
1	Edward Sels (BEL)	Solo–Superia	7h 49' 28"
2	Michael Wright (GBR)	Wiel's–Groene Leeuw	s.t.
3	Jan Janssen (NED)	Pelforth–Sauvage–Lejeune	s.t.
4	Jean Graczyk (FRA)	Margnat–Paloma–Dunlop	s.t.
5	Arthur Decabooter (BEL)	Solo–Superia	s.t.
6	Jo de Haan (NED)	Televizier	s.t.
7	Benoni Beheyt (BEL)	Wiel's–Groene Leeuw	s.t.
8	Rudi Altig (FRG)	Saint-Raphaël–Gitane–Dunlop	s.t.
9	Antonio Barrutia (ESP)	Kas–Kaskol	s.t.
10	Vito Taccone (ITA)	Salvarani	s.t.

General classification after stage 11

Rank	Rider	Team	Time
1	Georges Groussard (FRA)	Pelforth–Sauvage–Lejeune	67h 20' 23"
2	Jacques Anquetil (FRA)	Saint-Raphaël–Gitane–Dunlop	+ 1' 11"
3	Raymond Poulidor (FRA)	Mercier–BP–Hutchinson	+ 1' 42"
4	Federico Bahamontes (ESP)	Margnat–Paloma–Dunlop	+ 3' 04"
5	Henry Anglade (FRA)	Pelforth–Sauvage–Lejeune	+ 3' 05"
6	Rudi Altig (FRG)	Saint-Raphaël–Gitane–Dunlop	+ 4' 07"
7	André Foucher (FRA)	Pelforth–Sauvage–Lejeune	+ 4' 16"
8	Hans Junkermann (FRG)	Wiel's–Groene Leeuw	+ 5' 16"
9	Tom Simpson (GBR)	Peugeot–BP–Englebert	+ 5' 24"
10	Gilbert Desmet (BEL)	Wiel's–Groene Leeuw	+ 5' 58"
