= List of teams and cyclists in the 1965 Vuelta a España =

For the 1965 Vuelta a España, the field consisted of 100 riders; 51 finished the race.

== By rider ==
Legend
No.	Starting number worn by the rider during the Vuelta
Pos.	Position in the general classification
DNF	Denotes a rider who did not finish

No.	Name	Nationality	Team	Pos.	Ref
1	Raymond Poulidor	France	Mercier-BP	2	
2	Robert Cazala	France	Mercier-BP	28	
3	Georges Chappe	France	Mercier-BP	36	
4	Barry Hoban	Great Britain	Mercier-BP	47	
5	André Le Dissez	France	Mercier-BP	DNF	
6	Frans Melckenbeeck	Belgium	Mercier-BP	DNF	
7	Robert Poulot	France	Mercier-BP	DNF	
8	Jozef Spruyt	Belgium	Mercier-BP	37	
9	Victor Van Schil	Belgium	Mercier-BP	13	
10	Rolf Wolfshohl	West Germany	Mercier-BP	1	
11	Jaime Alomar	Spain	Ferrys	24	
12	José Bernárdez	Spain	Ferrys	40	
13	Antonio Bertrán	Spain	Ferrys	33	
14	Rogelio Hernández	Spain	Ferrys	29	
15	Esteban Martín	Spain	Ferrys	26	
16	Fernando Manzaneque	Spain	Ferrys	4	
17	Luis Otaño	Spain	Ferrys	14	
18	José Pérez Francés	Spain	Ferrys	DNF	
19	Raúl Rey	Spain	Ferrys	39	
20	Antonio Tous	Spain	Ferrys	38	
21	Willy Derboven	Belgium	Solo–Superia	DNF	
22	Armand Desmet	Belgium	Solo–Superia	25	
23	Henri De Wolf	Belgium	Solo–Superia	46	
24	Roger Baguet	Belgium	Solo–Superia	DNF	
25	Edward Sels	Belgium	Solo–Superia	DNF	
26	Edgard Sorgeloos	Belgium	Solo–Superia	DNF	
27	Jef Planckaert	Belgium	Solo–Superia	19	
28	Michel Van Aerde	Belgium	Solo–Superia	DNF	
29	Noël De Pauw	Belgium	Solo–Superia	DNF	
30	Rik Van Looy	Belgium	Solo–Superia	3	
31	Carlos Echeverría	Spain	Kas	5	
32	Francisco Gabica	Spain	Kas	6	
33	Antonio Gómez del Moral	Spain	Kas	9	
34	Joaquim Galera	Spain	Kas	16	
35	Sebastián Elorza	Spain	Kas	17	
36	Manuel Martín Piñera	Spain	Kas	21	
37	Julio Jiménez	Spain	Kas	34	
38	Valentín Uriona	Spain	Kas	DNF	
39	Antonio Barrutia	Spain	Kas	DNF	
40	Eusebio Vélez	Spain	Kas	DNF	
41	Mário Silva	Portugal	Portugal	DNF	
42	João Pinto	Portugal	Portugal	DNF	
43	João Roque	Portugal	Portugal	DNF	
44	Agostinho Sous	Portugal	Portugal	DNF	
45	Peixoto Alves	Portugal	Portugal	DNF	
46	Francisco Valada	Portugal	Portugal	DNF	
47	Sérgio Páscoa	Portugal	Portugal	DNF	
48	Jorge Corvo	Portugal	Portugal	DNF	
49	Laurentino Mendes	Portugal	Portugal	DNF	
50	Joaquim Leão	Portugal	Portugal	DNF	
51	Lucien Aimar	France	Ford–Gitane	11	
52	Michel Grain	France	Ford–Gitane	20	
53	Guy Ignolin	France	Ford–Gitane	DNF	
54	Jean Jourden	France	Ford–Gitane	DNF	
55	Jean-Claude Lebaube	France	Ford–Gitane	12	
56	Paul Lemeteyer	France	Ford–Gitane	45	
57	Anatole Novak	France	Ford–Gitane	DNF	
58	Jean-Louis Quesne	France	Ford–Gitane	51	
59	Gérard Thiélin	France	Ford–Gitane	DNF	
60	Jean-Claude Wuillemin	France	Ford–Gitane	8	
61	Claude Mattio	France	Tedi Montjuic	DNF	
62	Antonio Karmany	Spain	Tedi Montjuic	DNF	
63	Juan Sánchez Camero	Spain	Tedi Montjuic	DNF	
64	José Segú	Spain	Tedi Montjuic	27	
65	Salvador Rosa	Spain	Tedi Montjuic	DNF	
66	Antonio Suárez	Spain	Tedi Montjuic	30	
67	Nicolás Cayero	Spain	Tedi Montjuic	DNF	
68	José Antonio Artiñano	Spain	Tedi Montjuic	DNF	
69	Jesús Manzaneque	Spain	Tedi Montjuic	43	
70	Antonio Saban	Spain	Tedi Montjuic	48	
71	Rudi Altig	West Germany	Inuri-Margnat	DNF	
72	Willi Altig	West Germany	Inuri-Margnat	DNF	
73	Federico Bahamontes	Spain	Inuri-Margnat	10	
74	Gilbert Bellone	France	Inuri-Margnat	DNF	
75	Antonio Blanco	Spain	Inuri-Margnat	DNF	
76	José Martín Colmenarejo	Spain	Inuri-Margnat	32	
77	Ginés García	Spain	Inuri-Margnat	31	
78	Hans Junkermann	West Germany	Inuri-Margnat	7	
79	Joseph Novales	France	Inuri-Margnat	DNF	
80	Julio Sanz	Spain	Inuri-Margnat	50	
81	Francisco López Muñoz	Spain	Olsa	DNF	
82	José Ramon Goyeneche	Spain	Olsa	49	
83	Jesús Isasi	Spain	Olsa	42	
84	José María Errandonea	Spain	Olsa	DNF	
85	Andrés Incera	Spain	Olsa	44	
86	Gregorio San Miguel	Spain	Olsa	41	
87	José Luis Talamillo	Spain	Olsa	DNF	
88	Jacinto Urrestarazu	Spain	Olsa	DNF	
89	José Urrestarazu	Spain	Olsa	DNF	
90	Ventura Díaz	Spain	Olsa	23	
91	Jozef Timmerman	Belgium	Wiel's–Groene Leeuw	22	
92	Karl-Heinz Kunde	West Germany	Wiel's–Groene Leeuw	DNF	
93	Dieter Puschel	West Germany	Wiel's–Groene Leeuw	DNF	
94	Eddy Pauwels	Belgium	Wiel's–Groene Leeuw	18	
95	Frans Verbeeck	Belgium	Wiel's–Groene Leeuw	15	
96	Etienne Cotman	Belgium	Wiel's–Groene Leeuw	DNF	
97	Alfons Hellemans	Belgium	Wiel's–Groene Leeuw	DNF	
98	Karel Colpaert	Belgium	Wiel's–Groene Leeuw	DNF	
99	Willy Van den Eynde	Belgium	Wiel's–Groene Leeuw	DNF	
100	August Verhaegen	Belgium	Wiel's–Groene Leeuw	35	
