= 1964 Tour de France =

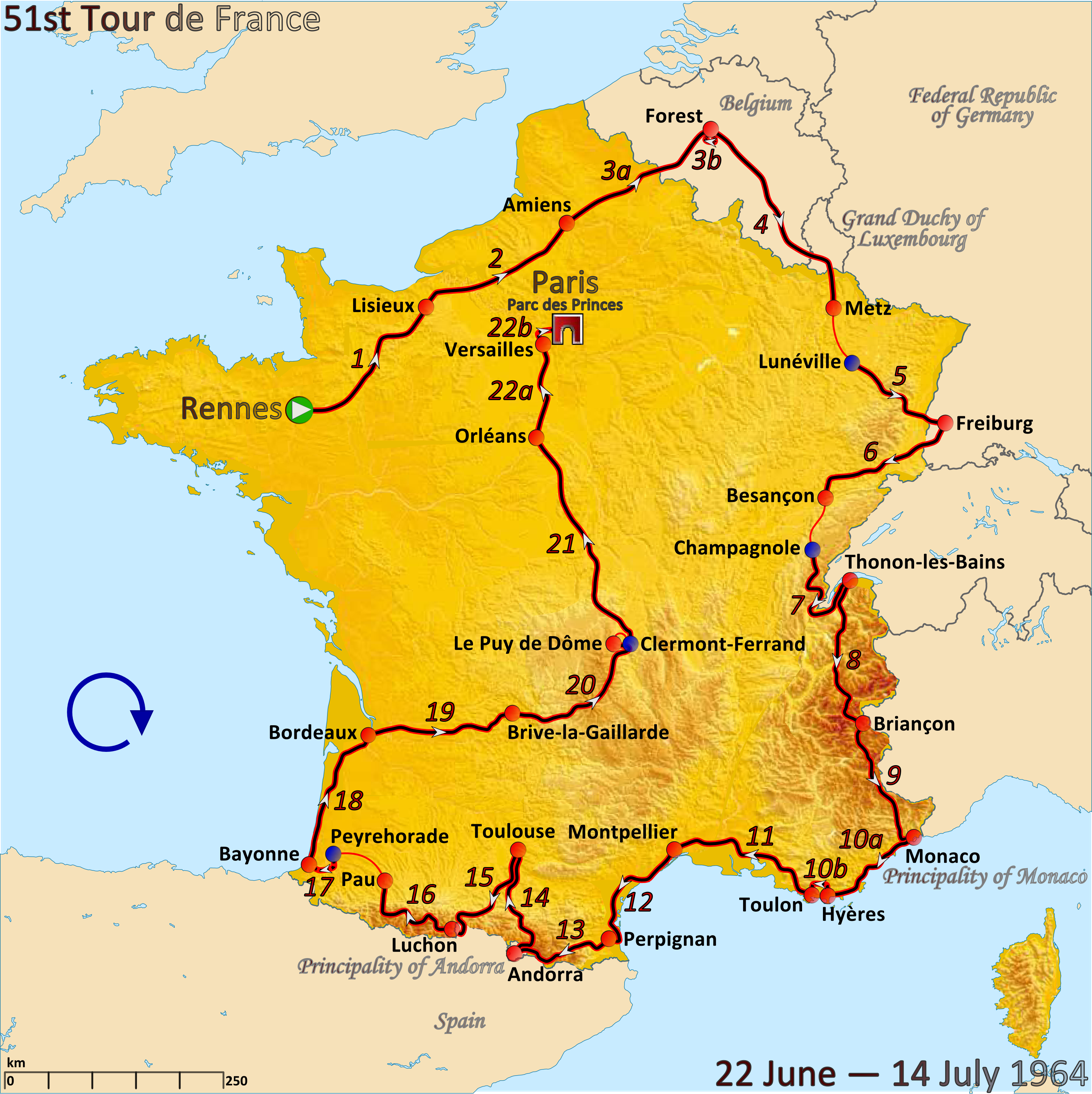
- Route of the 1964 Tour de France

Race details
- Dates: 22 June – 14 July 1964
- Stages: 22, including three split stages
- Distance: 4,504 km (2,799 mi)
- Winning time: 127h 09' 44"

Results
Jersey awarded to the overall winner	Winner	Jacques Anquetil (FRA)	(Saint-Raphaël–Gitane–Dunlop)
	Second	Raymond Poulidor (FRA)	(Mercier–BP–Hutchinson)
	Third	Federico Bahamontes (ESP)	(Margnat–Paloma–Dunlop)
Jersey awarded to the points classification winner	Points	Jan Janssen (NED)	(Pelforth–Sauvage–Lejeune)
	Mountains	Federico Bahamontes (ESP)	(Margnat–Paloma–Dunlop)
	Combativity	Henry Anglade (FRA)	(Pelforth–Sauvage–Lejeune)
	Team	Pelforth–Sauvage–Lejeune	

The 1964 Tour de France was the 51st edition of the Tour de France, one of cycling's Grand Tours. It took place between 22 June and 14 July, with 22 stages covering a distance of 4,504 km (2,799 mi). Stages 3, 10 and 22 were all two-part stages with the first half being a regular stage and the second half being a team or individual time trial. It was the only Tour de France to include a mid-stage climb to the Alpe d'Huez ski resort. The race was eventually won by Jacques Anquetil following an epic shoulder-to-shoulder battle with Raymond Poulidor during stage 20.

== Teams ==
The 1964 Tour started with 132 cyclists, divided into 12 teams of 11 cyclists.

The teams entering the race were:

- Saint-Raphaël–Gitane–Dunlop
- Mercier–BP–Hutchinson
- Peugeot–BP–Englebert
- Pelforth–Sauvage–Lejeune
- Margnat–Paloma–Dunlop
- Wiel's–Groene Leeuw
- Solo–Superia
- Flandria–Romeo
- Ferrys
- Kas–Kaskol
- Salvarani
- Televizier

== Pre-race favourites ==
The main favourite was defending champion Jacques Anquetil. He had won the 1964 Giro d'Italia earlier that year, and was trying to win a Tour-Giro double, which at that moment had only been done by Fausto Coppi.

== Route and stages ==
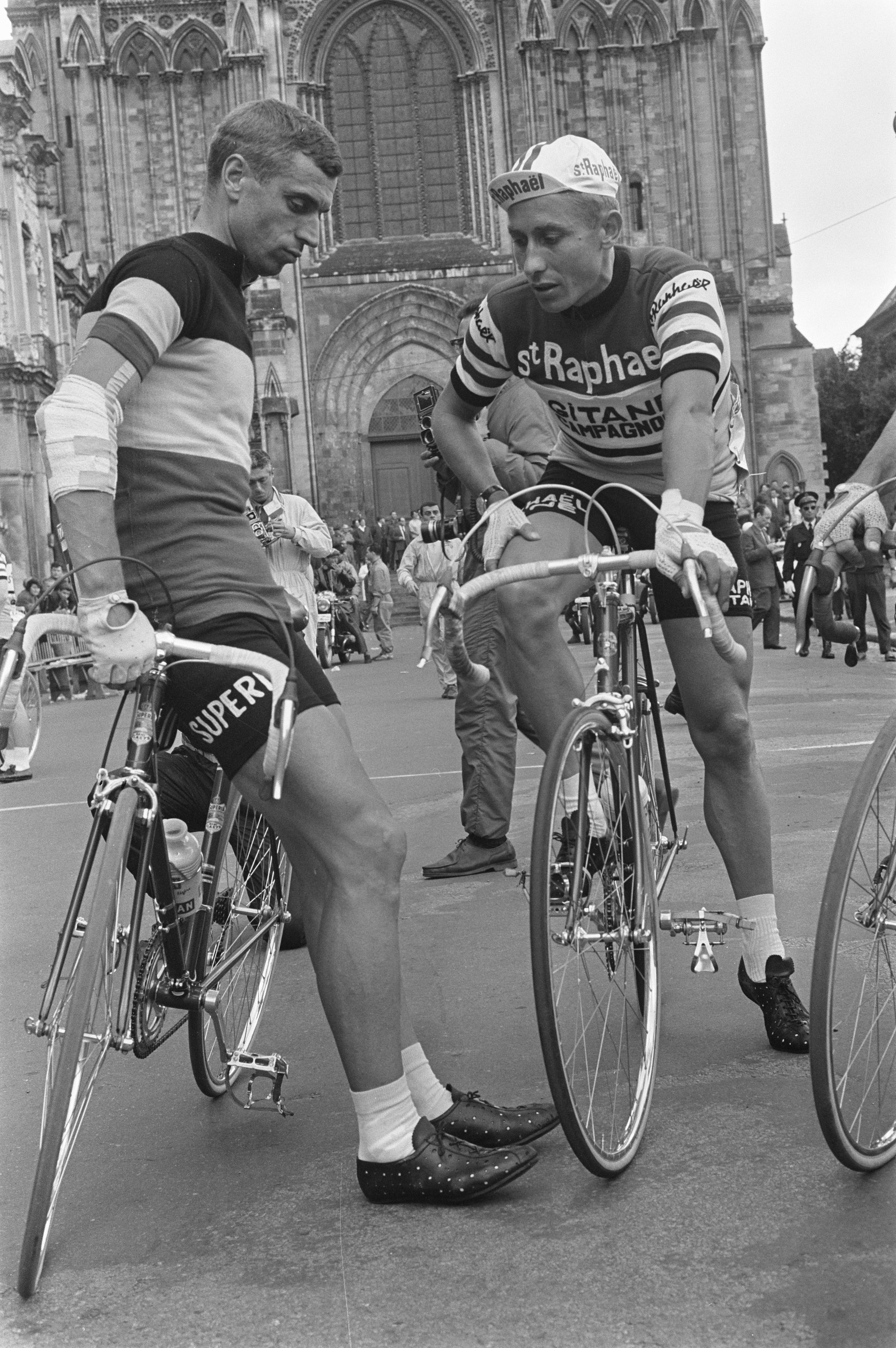
Departure in Lisieux. Rik Van Looy talking to Jacques Anquetil

The 1964 Tour de France started on 22 June, and had one rest day in Andorra. The highest point of elevation in the race was 2,802 m (9,193 ft) at the Cime de la Bonette loop road on stage 9.

Stage characteristics and winners
Stage	Date	Course	Distance	Type	Winner
1	22 June	Rennes to Lisieux	215 km (134 mi)	Plain stage	Edward Sels (BEL)
2	23 June	Lisieux to Amiens	208 km (129 mi)	Plain stage	André Darrigade (FRA)
3a	24 June	Amiens to Forest (Belgium)	197 km (122 mi)	Plain stage	Bernard Vandekerkhove (BEL)
3b	24 June	Forest (Belgium)	21 km (13 mi)	Team time trial	(Spain) Kas–Kaskol
4	25 June	Forest (Belgium) to Metz	292 km (181 mi)	Plain stage	Rudi Altig (FRG)
5	26 June	Lunéville to Freiburg (West Germany)	161 km (100 mi)	Plain stage	Willy Derboven (BEL)
6	27 June	Freiburg (West Germany) to Besançon	200 km (120 mi)	Plain stage	Henk Nijdam (NED)
7	28 June	Besançon to Thonon-les-Bains	195 km (121 mi)	Plain stage	Jan Janssen (NED)
8	29 June	Thonon-les-Bains to Briançon	249 km (155 mi)	Stage with mountain(s)	Federico Bahamontes (ESP)
9	30 June	Briançon to Monaco	239 km (149 mi)	Stage with mountain(s)	Jacques Anquetil (FRA)
10a	1 July	Monaco to Hyères	187 km (116 mi)	Plain stage	Jan Janssen (NED)
10b	1 July	Hyères to Toulon	21 km (13 mi)	Individual time trial	Jacques Anquetil (FRA)
11	2 July	Toulon to Montpellier	250 km (160 mi)	Plain stage	Edward Sels (BEL)
12	3 July	Montpellier to Perpignan	174 km (108 mi)	Plain stage	Jo de Roo (NED)
13	4 July	Perpignan to Andorra	170 km (110 mi)	Stage with mountain(s)	Julio Jiménez (ESP)
	5 July	Andorra		Rest day	
14	6 July	Andorra to Toulouse	186 km (116 mi)	Stage with mountain(s)	Edward Sels (BEL)
15	7 July	Toulouse to Luchon	203 km (126 mi)	Stage with mountain(s)	Raymond Poulidor (FRA)
16	8 July	Luchon to Pau	197 km (122 mi)	Stage with mountain(s)	Federico Bahamontes (ESP)
17	9 July	Peyrehorade to Bayonne	43 km (27 mi)	Individual time trial	Jacques Anquetil (FRA)
18	10 July	Bayonne to Bordeaux	187 km (116 mi)	Plain stage	André Darrigade (FRA)
19	11 July	Bordeaux to Brive	215 km (134 mi)	Plain stage	Edward Sels (BEL)
20	12 July	Brive to Puy de Dôme	217 km (135 mi)	Stage with mountain(s)	Julio Jiménez (ESP)
21	13 July	Clermont-Ferrand to Orléans	311 km (193 mi)	Plain stage	Jean Stablinski (FRA)
22a	14 July	Orléans to Versailles	119 km (74 mi)	Plain stage	Benoni Beheyt (BEL)
22b	14 July	Versailles to Paris	27 km (17 mi)	Individual time trial	Jacques Anquetil (FRA)
	Total		4,504 km (2,799 mi)		

== Race overview ==
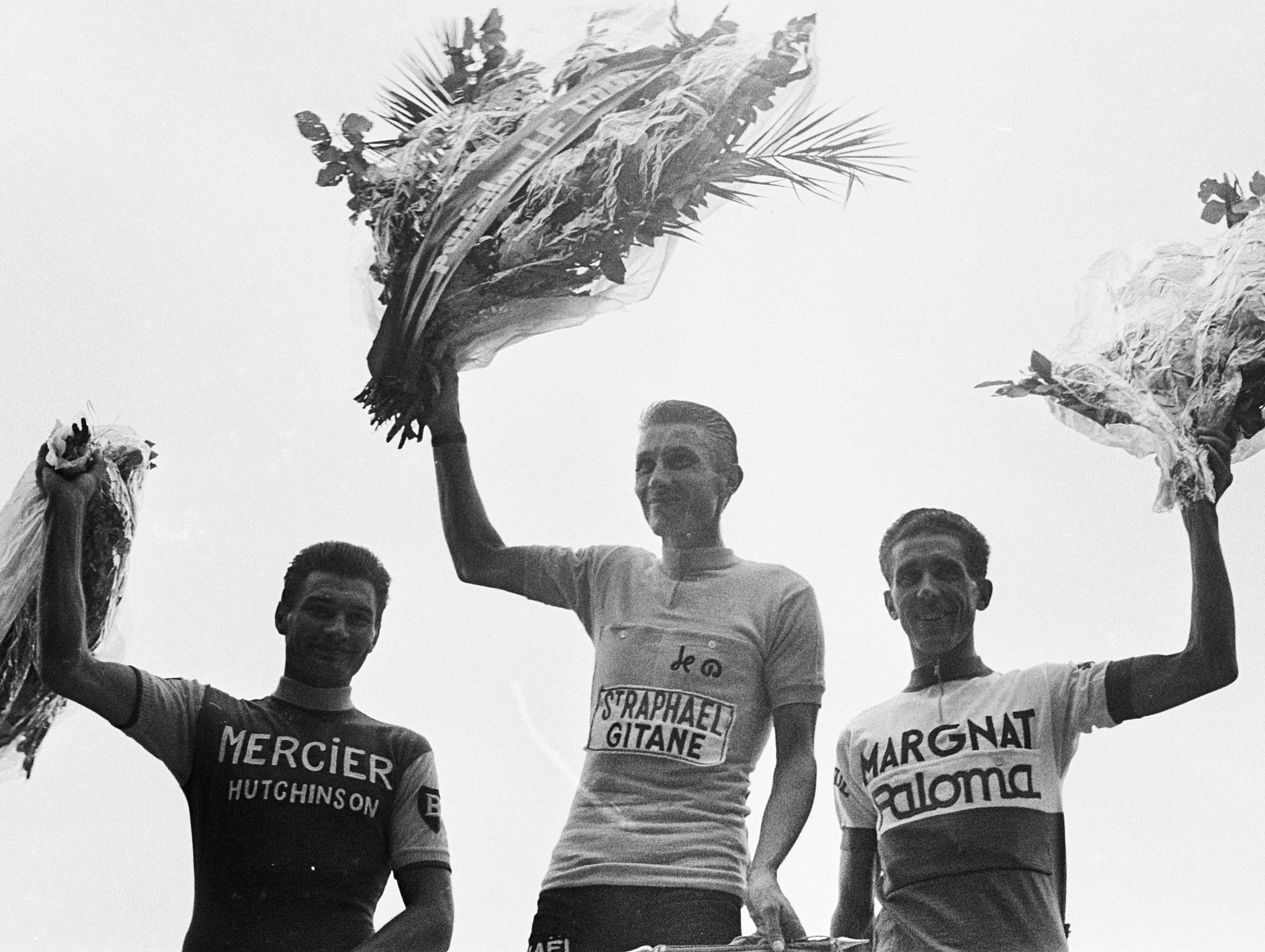
The final podium of the general classification. Left-to-right: Raymond Poulidor, Jacques Anquetil and Federico Bahamontes

Anquetil, who was looking for his fifth Tour victory, was superior in the time trials, of which he won all three. But Raymond Poulidor dominated in the mountains, and Anquetil was close to losing.

The ninth stage finished in Monaco, where the riders would ride one extra lap, crossing the finish line twice. When the first group, including Poulidor and Anquetil, reached the finish line for the first time, Poulidor had forgotten the extra lap, and sprinted in avail for the victory. When the group reached the finish line for the second time, Anquetil won the sprint, and one minute of bonification time.

In the second part of the tenth stage, the time trial, Anquetil won. Poulidor finished in second place, losing 36 seconds, with a flat tire costing him some time.

In the rest day between the thirteenth and the fourteenth stage, Anquetil had joined a lamb barbecue, and in the fourteenth stage he was immediately dropped. His team director gave him a bottle of champagne, which washed away the indigestion, and then Anquetil was able to get back to Poulidor. Poulidor then broke a spoke, the repair cost him some time, even more because a team mechanic, trying to help him gain speed, made him fall.

Poulidor attacked in the fifteenth stage, and stayed away. He won the stage, and in the general classification climbed to third place, nine seconds behind second-placed Anquetil.

Anquetil won the time trial of stage 17, and became the leader; Poulidor was in second place, only 56 seconds behind. In the twentieth stage, Poulidor did not have the right bicycle for the climb, but did not tell it to his team director. Poulidor dropped Anquetil in the climb, but the margin was not big enough for him to take over the lead, and Anquetil remained leader of the race by 14 seconds.

In the final time trial, Anquetil was the favourite, being the specialist. Poulidor rode as fast as he could, and with all other cyclists but Anquetil finished, had the best time. Anquetil was the last rider to ride the time trial, and was five seconds slower at the intermediate time check, which gave Poulidor hope that he could emerge as winner. However, Anquetil was clearly faster in the second part, and won the time trial. Anquetil won the Tour by only 55 seconds, which was at that moment the smallest margin in history.

== Classification leadership and minor prizes ==
There were several classifications in the 1964 Tour de France, two of them awarding jerseys to their leaders. The most important was the general classification, calculated by adding each cyclist's finishing times on each stage. The cyclist with the least accumulated time was the race leader, identified by the yellow jersey; the winner of this classification is considered the winner of the Tour.

Additionally, there was a points classification. In the points classification, cyclists got points for finishing among the best in a stage finish. The cyclist with the most points lead the classification, and was identified with a green jersey.

There was also a mountains classification. The organisation had categorised some climbs as either first, second, third, or fourth-category; points for this classification were won by the first cyclists that reached the top of these climbs first, with more points available for the higher-categorised climbs. The cyclist with the most points lead the classification, but was not identified with a jersey.

For the team classification, the times of the best three cyclists per team on each stage were added; the leading team was the team with the lowest total time. The riders in the team that led this classification wore yellow caps.

In addition, there was a combativity award, in which a jury composed of journalists gave points after certain stages to the cyclist they considered most combative. The split stages each had a combined winner. At the conclusion of the Tour, Henry Anglade won the overall super-combativity award, also decided by journalists. The Souvenir Henri Desgrange was given in honour of Tour founder Henri Desgrange to the first rider to pass a point by his final residence, the "Villa Mia" in Beauvallon, Grimaud, on the French Riviera on stage 10a. This prize was won by André Darrigade.

Classification leadership by stage
Stage	Winner	General classification	Points classification	Mountains classification (Note: No jersey was awarded to the leader of the mountains classification until a white jersey with red polka dots was introduced in 1975.)	Team classification	Combativity award	Bad luck award
1	Edward Sels	Edward Sels	Edward Sels	Raymond Poulidor	Wiel's–Groene Leeuw	Henry Anglade	Rik Van Looy
2	André Darrigade	Edward Sels	Jan Janssen	Robert Poulot	Wiel's–Groene Leeuw	Rik Van Looy	Guy Seyve
3a	Bernard Van de Kerckhove	Bernard Van de Kerckhove	Jan Janssen	Robert Poulot	Solo–Superia	Solo–Superia	Valentín Uriona
3b	Kas–Kaskol	Bernard Van de Kerckhove	Jan Janssen	Robert Poulot	Kas–Kaskol	Solo–Superia	Valentín Uriona
4	Rudi Altig	Bernard Van de Kerckhove	Rudi Altig	Julio Jiménez	Pelforth–Sauvage–Lejeune	no award	Emile Daems
5	Willy Derboven	Rudi Altig	Rudi Altig	Rudi Altig	Pelforth–Sauvage–Lejeune	Joaquim Galera	François Mahé
6	Henk Nijdam	Rudi Altig	Rudi Altig	Rudi Altig	Pelforth–Sauvage–Lejeune	Henk Nijdam	Ferdinand Bracke
7	Jan Janssen	Rudi Altig	Jan Janssen	Julio Jiménez	Pelforth–Sauvage–Lejeune	Guy Epaud	no award
8	Federico Bahamontes	Georges Groussard	Jan Janssen	Julio Jiménez	Pelforth–Sauvage–Lejeune	Federico Bahamontes	Jacques Anquetil
9	Jacques Anquetil	Georges Groussard	Jan Janssen	Federico Bahamontes	Pelforth–Sauvage–Lejeune	Jacques Anquetil	no award
10a	Jan Janssen	Georges Groussard	Jan Janssen	Federico Bahamontes	Pelforth–Sauvage–Lejeune	no award	no award
10b	Jacques Anquetil	Georges Groussard	Jan Janssen	Federico Bahamontes	Pelforth–Sauvage–Lejeune	no award	no award
11	Edward Sels	Georges Groussard	Jan Janssen	Federico Bahamontes	Pelforth–Sauvage–Lejeune	no award	no award
12	Jo de Roo	Georges Groussard	Jan Janssen	Federico Bahamontes	Pelforth–Sauvage–Lejeune	Saint-Raphaël–Gitane–Dunlop	Jos Hoevenaers
13	Julio Jiménez	Georges Groussard	Jan Janssen	Federico Bahamontes	Pelforth–Sauvage–Lejeune	Julio Jiménez	Armand Desmet
14	Edward Sels	Georges Groussard	Rudi Altig	Federico Bahamontes	Pelforth–Sauvage–Lejeune	Henry Anglade	Raymond Poulidor
15	Raymond Poulidor	Georges Groussard	Jan Janssen	Federico Bahamontes	Pelforth–Sauvage–Lejeune	Raymond Poulidor	no award
16	Federico Bahamontes	Georges Groussard	Jan Janssen	Federico Bahamontes	Pelforth–Sauvage–Lejeune	Federico Bahamontes	no award
17	Jacques Anquetil	Jacques Anquetil	Jan Janssen	Federico Bahamontes	Pelforth–Sauvage–Lejeune	no award	Raymond Poulidor
18	André Darrigade	Jacques Anquetil	Jan Janssen	Federico Bahamontes	Pelforth–Sauvage–Lejeune	André Darrigade	no award
19	Edward Sels	Jacques Anquetil	Jan Janssen	Federico Bahamontes	Pelforth–Sauvage–Lejeune	Solo–Superia	Jean Graczyk
20	Julio Jiménez	Jacques Anquetil	Jan Janssen	Federico Bahamontes	Pelforth–Sauvage–Lejeune	Jacques Anquetil	Luis Otaño
21	Jean Stablinski	Jacques Anquetil	Jan Janssen	Federico Bahamontes	Pelforth–Sauvage–Lejeune	Joseph Novales	no award
22a	Benoni Beheyt	Jacques Anquetil	Jan Janssen	Federico Bahamontes	Pelforth–Sauvage–Lejeune	Benoni Beheyt	no award
22b	Jacques Anquetil	Jacques Anquetil	Jan Janssen	Federico Bahamontes	Pelforth–Sauvage–Lejeune	Benoni Beheyt	no award
Final		Jacques Anquetil	Jan Janssen	Federico Bahamontes	Pelforth–Sauvage–Lejeune	Henry Anglade	Rik Van Looy

== Final standings ==
=== General classification ===
Final general classification (1–10)
Rank	Rider	Team	Time
1	Jacques Anquetil (FRA)	Saint-Raphaël–Gitane–Dunlop	127h 09' 44"
2	Raymond Poulidor (FRA)	Mercier–BP–Hutchinson	+ 55"
3	Federico Bahamontes (ESP)	Margnat–Paloma–Dunlop	+ 4' 44"
4	Henry Anglade (FRA)	Pelforth–Sauvage–Lejeune	+ 6' 42"
5	Georges Groussard (FRA)	Pelforth–Sauvage–Lejeune	+ 10' 34"
6	André Foucher (FRA)	Pelforth–Sauvage–Lejeune	+ 10' 36"
7	Julio Jiménez (ESP)	Kas–Kaskol	+ 12' 13"
8	Gilbert Desmet (BEL)	Wiel's–Groene Leeuw	+ 12' 17"
9	Hans Junkermann (FRG)	Wiel's–Groene Leeuw	+ 14' 02"
10	Vittorio Adorni (ITA)	Salvarani	+ 14' 19"

Final general classification (11–81)
Rank	Rider	Team	Time
11	Esteban Martín (ESP)	Margnat–Paloma–Dunlop	+ 25' 11"
12	Fernando Manzaneque (ESP)	Ferrys	+ 32' 09"
13	Francisco Gabica (ESP)	Kas–Kaskol	+ 41' 47"
14	Tom Simpson (GBR)	Peugeot–BP–Englebert	+ 41' 50"
15	Rudi Altig (FRG)	Saint-Raphaël–Gitane–Dunlop	+ 42' 08"
16	Karl-Heinz Kunde (FRG)	Wiel's–Groene Leeuw	+ 42' 16"
17	Joachin Galera (ESP)	Kas–Kaskol	+ 43' 47"
18	Henri Duez (FRA)	Peugeot–BP–Englebert	+ 46' 16"
19	Joseph Novales (FRA)	Margnat–Paloma–Dunlop	+ 48' 49"
20	Eddy Pauwels (BEL)	Margnat–Paloma–Dunlop	+ 50' 02"
21	Arnaldo Pambianco (ITA)	Salvarani	+ 52' 00"
22	Louis Rostollan (FRA)	Saint-Raphaël–Gitane–Dunlop	+ 55' 06"
23	Sebastián Elorza (ESP)	Kas–Kaskol	+ 55' 14"
24	Jan Janssen (NED)	Pelforth–Sauvage–Lejeune	+ 59' 31"
25	Battista Babini (ITA)	Salvarani	+ 1h 05' 24"
26	Rogelio Hernández (ESP)	Ferrys	+ 1h 08' 16"
27	Claude Mattio (FRA)	Margnat–Paloma–Dunlop	+ 1h 13' 45"
28	Raymond Mastrotto (FRA)	Peugeot–BP–Englebert	+ 1h 16' 34"
29	Paul Vermeulen (FRA)	Mercier–BP–Hutchinson	+ 1h 18' 50"
30	Willy Monty (BEL)	Pelforth–Sauvage–Lejeune	+ 1h 23' 26"
31	Jean Gainche (FRA)	Mercier–BP–Hutchinson	+ 1h 28' 20"
32	Victor Van Schil (BEL)	Mercier–BP–Hutchinson	+ 1h 30' 13"
33	Edouard Sels (BEL)	Solo–Superia	+ 1h 31' 35"
34	Guy Epaud (FRA)	Pelforth–Sauvage–Lejeune	+ 1h 33' 12"
35	Jean Stablinski (FRA)	Saint-Raphaël–Gitane–Dunlop	+ 1h 34' 10"
36	André Zimmerman (FRA)	Saint-Raphaël–Gitane–Dunlop	+ 1h 37' 52"
37	Hubertus Zilverberg (NED)	Flandria–Romeo	+ 1h 41' 30"
38	Albertus Geldermans (NED)	Saint-Raphaël–Gitane–Dunlop	+ 1h 46' 24"
39	Cees Haast (NED)	Televizier	+ 1h 47' 44"
40	Gilbert De Smet (BEL)	Wiel's–Groene Leeuw	+ 1h 48' 12"
41	Juan Uribezubia (ESP)	Kas–Kaskol	+ 1h 49' 33"
42	Camille Vyncke (BEL)	Flandria–Romeo	+ 2h 00' 17"
43	Jo de Roo (NED)	Saint-Raphaël–Gitane–Dunlop	+ 2h 00' 23"
44	Luis Otaño (ESP)	Ferrys	+ 2h 01' 11"
45	José Segú (ESP)	Margnat–Paloma–Dunlop	+ 2h 01' 34"
46	Antonio Franchi (ITA)	Salvarani	+ 2h 03' 28"
47	Robert Poulot (FRA)	Mercier–BP–Hutchinson	+ 2h 06' 26"
48	Bruno Fantinato (ITA)	Salvarani	+ 2h 06' 35"
49	Benoni Beheyt (BEL)	Wiel's–Groene Leeuw	+ 2h 08' 07"
50	Italo Mazzacurati (ITA)	Salvarani	+ 2h 08' 08"
51	Edouard Delberghe (BEL)	Pelforth–Sauvage–Lejeune	+ 2h 09' 40"
52	Martín Piñera (ESP)	Kas–Kaskol	+ 2h 11' 03"
53	Guillaume Van Tongerloo (BEL)	Flandria–Romeo	+ 2h 15' 34"
54	Hubert Ferrer (FRA)	Pelforth–Sauvage–Lejeune	+ 2h 15' 59"
55	Antonio Bertrán (ESP)	Ferrys	+ 2h 18' 38"
56	Michael Wright (GBR)	Wiel's–Groene Leeuw	+ 2h 19' 08"
57	Bernard Vandekerkhove (BEL)	Solo–Superia	+ 2h 21' 29"
58	Michel Van Aerde (BEL)	Solo–Superia	+ 2h 21' 57"
59	Robert Cazala (FRA)	Mercier–BP–Hutchinson	+ 2h 24' 21"
60	Jo de Haan (NED)	Televizier	+ 2h 25' 47"
61	Edgard Sorgeloos (BEL)	Solo–Superia	+ 2h 30' 22"
62	Mario Minieri (ITA)	Salvarani	+ 2h 31' 29"
63	Pierre Everaert (FRA)	Saint-Raphaël–Gitane–Dunlop	+ 2h 32' 09"
64	Rik Wauters (NED)	Televizier	+ 2h 34' 06"
65	Barry Hoban (GBR)	Mercier–BP–Hutchinson	+ 2h 38' 48"
66	Hank Nijdam (NED)	Televizier	+ 2h 41' 02"
67	André Darrigade (FRA)	Margnat–Paloma–Dunlop	+ 2h 41' 09"
68	Willy Derboven (BEL)	Solo–Superia	+ 2h 42' 09"
69	Camille Le Menn (FRA)	Peugeot–BP–Englebert	+ 2h 47' 36"
70	Frans Brands (BEL)	Flandria–Romeo	+ 2h 48' 28"
71	François Hamon (FRA)	Peugeot–BP–Englebert	+ 2h 50' 23"
72	Vin Denson (GBR)	Solo–Superia	+ 2h 57' 23"
73	Antonio Barrutia (ESP)	Kas–Kaskol	+ 2h 57' 57"
74	Joseph Groussard (FRA)	Pelforth–Sauvage–Lejeune	+ 2h 59' 28"
75	Frans Aerenhouts (BEL)	Mercier–BP–Hutchinson	+ 3h 03' 06"
76	Jean Graczyk (FRA)	Margnat–Paloma–Dunlop	+ 3h 04' 21"
77	Jean Milesi (FRA)	Margnat–Paloma–Dunlop	+ 3h 07' 07"
78	Jean-Pierre Genet (FRA)	Mercier–BP–Hutchinson	+ 3h 12' 55"
79	Jean-Baptiste Claes (BEL)	Wiel's–Groene Leeuw	+ 3h 12' 57"
80	Salvador Honrubia (ESP)	Ferrys	+ 3h 17' 07"
81	Anatole Novak (FRA)	Saint-Raphaël–Gitane–Dunlop	+ 3h 19' 02"

=== Points classification ===
Final points classification (1–10)
Rank	Rider	Team	Points
1	Jan Janssen (NED)	Pelforth–Sauvage–Lejeune	208
2	Ward Sels (BEL)	Solo–Superia	199
3	Rudi Altig (FRG)	Saint-Raphaël–Gitane–Dunlop	165
4	Gilbert Desmet (BEL)	Wiel's–Groene Leeuw	147
5	Raymond Poulidor (FRA)	Mercier–BP–Hutchinson	133
6	Jacques Anquetil (FRA)	Saint-Raphaël–Gitane–Dunlop	111
7	Benoni Beheyt (BEL)	Wiel's–Groene Leeuw	103
7	Henk Nijdam (NED)	Televizier	103
9	Vittorio Adorni (ITA)	Salvarani	83
10	André Darrigade (FRA)	Margnat–Paloma–Dunlop	79

=== Mountains classification ===
Final mountains classification (1–10)
Rank	Rider	Team	Points
1	Federico Bahamontes (ESP)	Margnat–Paloma–Dunlop	173
2	Julio Jiménez (ESP)	Kas–Kaskol	167
3	Raymond Poulidor (FRA)	Mercier–BP–Hutchinson	89
4	Hans Junkermann (FRG)	Wiel's–Groene Leeuw	47
5	Henri Anglade (FRA)	Pelforth–Sauvage–Lejeune	43
6	Jacques Anquetil (FRA)	Saint-Raphaël–Gitane–Dunlop	34
7	André Foucher (FRA)	Pelforth–Sauvage–Lejeune	33
8	Karl-Heinz Kunde (FRG)	Wiel's–Groene Leeuw	27
9	Vittorio Adorni (ITA)	Salvarani	26
10	Manuel Martín Piñera (ESP)	Kas–Kaskol	23

=== Team classification ===
Final team classification
Rank	Team	Time
1	Pelforth–Sauvage–Lejeune	381h 33' 26"
2	Wiel's–Groene Leeuw	+ 30' 24"
3	Saint-Raphaël–Gitane–Dunlop	+ 30' 49"
4	Margnat–Paloma–Dunlop	+ 53' 09"
5	Kas–Kaskol	+ 1h 07' 44"
6	Salvarani	+ 1h 50' 42"
7	Mercier–BP–Hutchinson	+ 2h 02' 53"
8	Ferrys	+ 2h 11' 22"
9	Peugeot–BP–Englebert	+ 2h 27' 35"
10	Flandria–Romeo	+ 4h 32' 17"
11	Solo–Superia	+ 4h 39' 05"
12	Televizier	+ 5h 35' 10"

== Bibliography ==
- Augendre, Jacques (2016). Guide historique [Historical guide] (PDF) (in French). Paris: Amaury Sport Organisation. Archived (PDF) from the original on 17 August 2016.
- McGann, Bill; McGann, Carol (2006). The Story of the Tour de France: 1903–1964. Vol. 1. Indianapolis: Dog Ear Publishing. ISBN 978-1-59858-180-5.
- Nauright, John; Parrish, Charles (2012). Sports Around the World: History, Culture, and Practice. Vol. 2. Santa Barbara, California: ABC-CLIO. ISBN 978-1-59884-300-2.
- Seray, Jacques [in French]; Lablaine, Jacques (2006). Henri Desgrange, l'homme qui créa le Tour de France [Henri Desgrange, the man who created the Tour de France] (in French). Saint-Malo, France: Editions Cristel. ISBN 978-2-84421-042-5.
- van den Akker, Pieter (2018). Tour de France Rules and Statistics: 1903–2018. Self-published. ISBN 978-1-79398-080-9.
