= 1965 Gent–Wevelgem =

- Official poster of the event

Race details
- Dates: 21 March 1965
- Stages: 1
- Distance: 235 km (146 mi)
- Winning time: 5h 36' 00"

Results
	Winner	Noël De Pauw (BEL)	(Solo–Superia)
	Second	Bernard Van de Kerckhove (BEL)	(Solo–Superia)
	Third	Gustaaf De Smet (BEL)	(Ford France–Gitane)

The 1965 Gent–Wevelgem was the 27th edition of the Belgian Gent–Wevelgem cycle race and was held on 21 March 1965. The race started in Ghent and finished in Wevelgem. The race was won by Noël De Pauw of the Solo–Superia team.

== General classification ==
Final general classification

Rank	Rider	Team	Time
1	Noël De Pauw (BEL)	Solo–Superia	5h 36' 00"
2	Bernard Van de Kerckhove (BEL)	Solo–Superia	+ 37"
3	Gustaaf De Smet (BEL)	Wiel's–Groene Leeuw	+ 1' 31"
4	Seamus Elliott (IRL)	Ford France–Gitane	+ 1' 32"
5	Edward Sels (BEL)	Solo–Superia	+ 1' 35"
6	Willy Vannitsen (BEL)	Ford France–Gitane	+ 1' 35"
7	Carmine Preziosi (ITA)	Pelforth–Sauvage–Lejeune	+ 1' 35"
8	Arthur Decabooter (BEL)	Wiel's–Groene Leeuw	+ 1' 35"
9	Norbert Kerckhove (BEL)	Dr. Mann	+ 1' 35"
10	Michael Wright (GBR)	Wiel's–Groene Leeuw	+ 1' 35"
