= 1964 Critérium du Dauphiné Libéré =

Race details
- Dates: 29 May – 6 June 1964
- Stages: 9
- Distance: 1,889 km (1,174 mi)
- Winning time: 52h 57' 13"

Results
	Winner	Valentín Uriona (ESP)	(Kas–Kaskol)
	Second	Raymond Poulidor (FRA)	(Mercier–BP–Hutchinson)
	Third	Esteban Martín (ESP)	(Margnat–Paloma–Dunlop)
	Points	Arie den Hartog (NED)	(Saint-Raphaël–Gitane–Dunlop)
	Mountains	Esteban Martín (ESP)	(Margnat–Paloma–Dunlop)
	Team	Kas–Kaskol	

The 1964 Critérium du Dauphiné Libéré was the 18th edition of the cycle race and was held from 29 May to 6 June 1964. The race started in Avignon and finished in Grenoble. The race was won by Valentín Uriona of the Kas team.

== General classification ==
Final general classification

Rank	Rider	Team	Time
1	Valentín Uriona (ESP)	Kas–Kaskol	52h 57' 13"
2	Raymond Poulidor (FRA)	Mercier–BP–Hutchinson	+ 1' 58"
3	Esteban Martín (ESP)	Margnat–Paloma–Dunlop	+ 3' 32"
4	Francisco Gabica (ESP)	Kas–Kaskol	+ 4' 03"
5	André Foucher (FRA)	Pelforth–Sauvage–Lejeune	+ 4' 07"
6	Federico Bahamontes (ESP)	Margnat–Paloma–Dunlop	+ 4' 38"
7	Fernando Manzaneque (ESP)	Ferrys	+ 4' 42"
8	Eusebio Vélez (ESP)	Kas–Kaskol	+ 5' 06"
9	Jean-Claude Lebaube (FRA)	Saint-Raphaël–Gitane–Dunlop	+ 5' 16"
10	José Pérez Francés (ESP)	Ferrys	+ 5' 37"
