= 1964 Paris–Nice =

Race details
- Dates: 9–17 March 1964
- Stages: 9
- Distance: 1,525.2 km (947.7 mi)
- Winning time: 41h 56' 28"

Results
Jersey awarded to the overall winner	Winner	Jan Janssen (NED)	(Pelforth–Sauvage–Lejeune)
	Second	Jean-Claude Annaert (FRA)	(Mercier–BP–Hutchinson)
	Third	Jean Forestier (FRA)	(Peugeot–BP–Englebert)

The 1964 Paris–Nice was the 22nd edition of the Paris–Nice cycle race and was held from 9 March to 17 March 1964. The race started in Paris and finished in Nice. The race was won by Jan Janssen of the Pelforth team.

== General classification ==
Final general classification

Rank	Rider	Team	Time
1	Jan Janssen (NED)	Pelforth–Sauvage–Lejeune	41h 56' 28"
2	Jean-Claude Annaert (FRA)	Mercier–BP–Hutchinson	+ 1' 01"
3	Jean Forestier (FRA)	Peugeot–BP–Englebert	+ 2' 58"
4	Jef Planckaert (BEL)	Flandria–Romeo	+ 3' 58"
5	Alan Ramsbottom (GBR)	Pelforth–Sauvage–Lejeune	+ 4' 05"
6	Jacques Anquetil (FRA)	Saint-Raphaël–Gitane–Dunlop	+ 4' 39"
7	François Mahé (FRA)	Pelforth–Sauvage–Lejeune	+ 4' 41"
8	Edward Sels (BEL)	Solo–Superia	+ 4' 55"
9	Jean Milesi (FRA)	Margnat–Paloma–Dunlop	+ 6' 39"
10	Frans Brands (BEL)	Flandria–Romeo	+ 8' 15"
