= 1962 Critérium du Dauphiné Libéré =

Race details
- Dates: 28 May – 3 June 1962
- Stages: 7
- Distance: 1,487 km (924 mi)
- Winning time: 41h 22' 04"

Results
	Winner	Raymond Mastrotto (FRA)	(Gitane–Leroux–Dunlop–R. Geminiani)
	Second	Hans Junkermann (FRG)	(Wiel's–Groene Leeuw)
	Third	Raymond Poulidor (FRA)	(Mercier–BP–Hutchinson)
	Points	Frans De Mulder (BEL)	(Wiel's–Groene Leeuw)
	Mountains	Federico Bahamontes (ESP)	(Margnat–Paloma–D'Alessandro)
	Team	Gitane–Leroux–Dunlop–R. Geminiani	

The 1962 Critérium du Dauphiné Libéré was the 16th edition of the cycle race and was held from 28 May to 3 June 1962. The race started in Chamonix and finished at Grenoble. The race was won by Raymond Mastrotto of the Gitane–Leroux team.

== General classification ==
Final general classification

Rank	Rider	Team	Time
1	Raymond Mastrotto (FRA)	Gitane–Leroux–Dunlop–R. Geminiani	41h 22' 04"
2	Hans Junkermann (FRG)	Wiel's–Groene Leeuw	+ 43"
3	Raymond Poulidor (FRA)	Mercier–BP–Hutchinson	+ 1' 33"
4	Federico Bahamontes (ESP)	Margnat–Paloma–D'Alessandro	+ 9' 05"
5	Jean-Claude Lebaube (FRA)	Gitane–Leroux–Dunlop–R. Geminiani	+ 9' 26"
6	Jean Dotto (FRA)	Liberia–Grammont–Wolber	+ 12' 44"
7	Dick Enthoven (NED)	Pelforth–Sauvage–Lejeune	+ 14' 17"
8	José Bernárdez (ESP)	Faema	+ 14' 29"
9	José Gómez del Moral (ESP)	Faema	+ 16' 00"
10	Juan Campillo (ESP)	Margnat–Paloma–D'Alessandro	+ 16' 00"
