= Hans Junkermann =

Hans Junkermann may refer to:

- Hans Junkermann (cyclist)
- Hans Junkermann (actor)
