= 1965 Paris–Roubaix =

Race details
- Dates: 11 April 1965
- Stages: 1
- Distance: 267.5 km (166.2 mi)
- Winning time: 6h 23' 32"

Results
	Winner	Rik van Looy (BEL)	(Solo–Superia)
	Second	Edward Sels (BEL)	(Solo–Superia)
	Third	Willy Vannitsen (BEL)	(Ford France–Gitane)

The 1965 Paris–Roubaix was the 63rd edition of the Paris–Roubaix cycle race and was held on 11 April 1965. The race started in Compiègne and finished in Roubaix. The race was won by Rik van Looy of the Solo–Superia team. The 267.5 kilometres (166.2 mi) course included 22 kilometres (14 mi) of cobbles.

== General classification ==
Final general classification

Rank	Rider	Team	Time
1	Rik Van Looy (BEL)	Solo–Superia	6h 23' 32"
2	Edward Sels (BEL)	Solo–Superia	+ 1' 05"
3	Willy Vannitsen (BEL)	Ford France–Gitane	+ 1' 11"
4	Victor Van Schil (BEL)	Mercier–BP–Hutchinson	+ 1' 11"
5	Jos Huysmans (BEL)	Dr. Mann	+ 1' 11"
6	Tom Simpson (GBR)	Peugeot–BP–Michelin	+ 1' 11"
7	Vittorio Adorni (ITA)	Salvarani	+ 1' 11"
8	Alfons Hermans (BEL)	Lamot–Libertas	+ 1' 11"
9	Noël Foré (BEL)	Flandria–Romeo	+ 1' 33"
10	Georges Van Coningsloo (BEL)	Peugeot–BP–Michelin	+ 2' 13"
