= Solo–Superia =

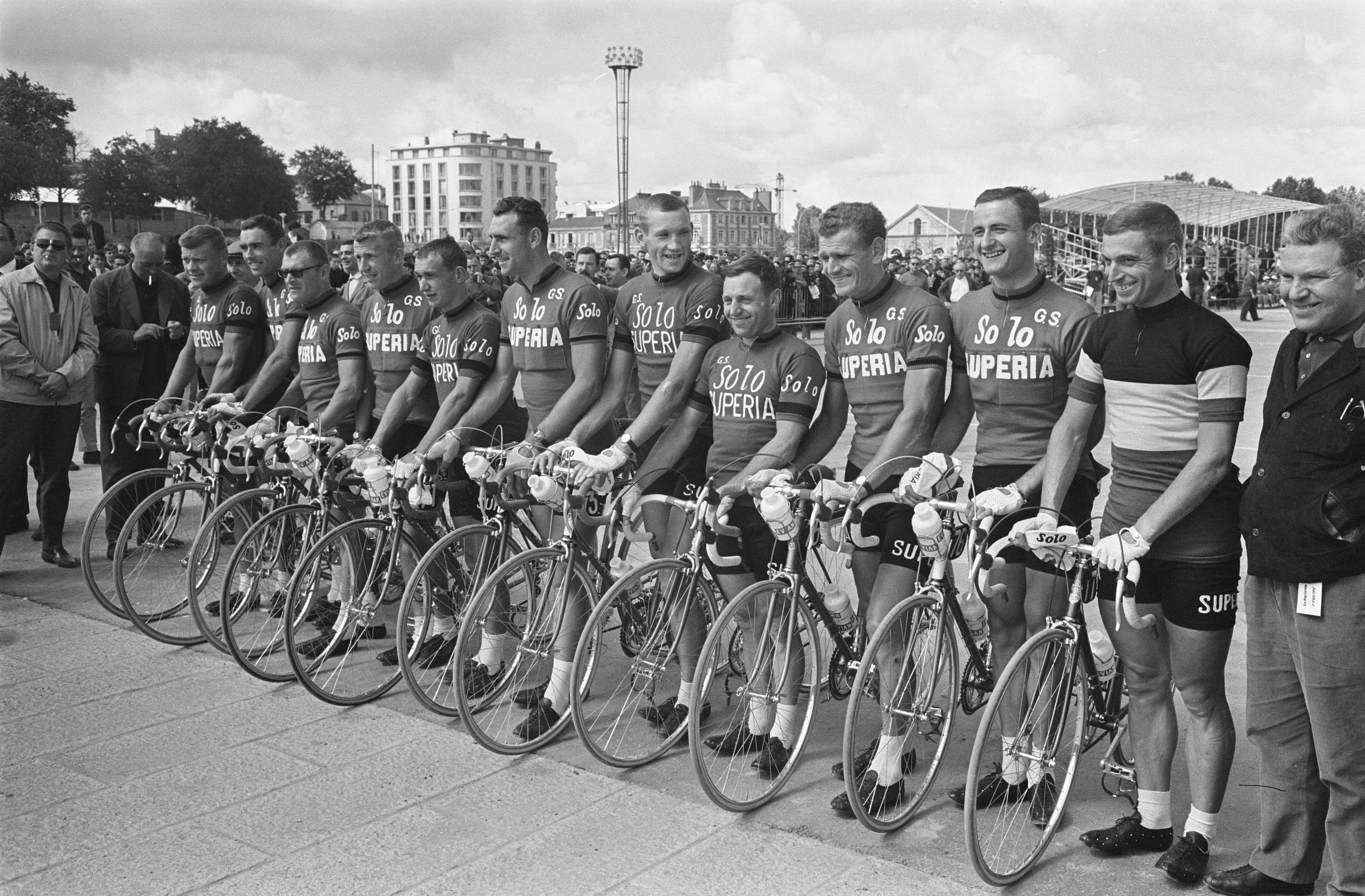
- The Solo–Superia squad of the 1964 Tour de France

Team information
- Registered: Belgium
- Founded: 1961
- Disbanded: 1966
- Discipline: Road

Team name history
- 1961–1962 1963 1964–1966: Solo–Van Steenbergen; Solo–Terrot; Solo–Superia
Solo–Superia jersey
Jersey

Solo–Superia was a Belgian professional cycling team that existed from 1961 to 1966. Its main sponsor was Belgian margarine manufacturer Solo. Its most notable wins were the 1965 Paris–Roubaix with Rik Van Looy and the 1966 Tour of Flanders with Edward Sels.

== Major results ==
=== 1961 – Solo–Van Steenbergen ===
- Elfstedenronde, Rik Van Steenbergen
- Tour de Luxembourg Stage 1, Robert Lelangue
- Druivenkoers Overijse, Ludo Janssens
- Paris–Tours, Joseph Wouters

=== 1962 – Solo–Van Steenbergen ===
- Brabantse Pijl, Ludo Janssens
- Paris–Brussels, Joseph Wouters
- Elfstedenronde, Emile Severeyns
- Peace Race, Stage 9 Roger De Breuker

=== 1963 – Solo–Terrot–Van Steenbergen ===
- Ronde van Limburg, Joseph Wouters
- Paris–Nice, Joseph Wouters
- Brabantse Pijl, Joseph Wouters
- Dwars door België Stage 1, Albert Covens
- Four Days of Dunkirk

Stage 1, Henri De Wolf
Stage 2, Robert Lelangue

- Tour de France Stage 6a & 20, Roger De Breuker
- Druivenkoers Overijse, Henri De Wolf

=== 1964 – Solo–Superia ===
- Kuurne–Brussels–Kuurne, Arthur Decabooter
- Sassari–Cagliari, Edgard Sorgeloos
- Paris–Nice

Stage 1 & 9, Edward Sels
Stage 8a, Bernard Van de Kerckhove

- Harelbeke–Antwerpen–Harelbeke, Rik Van Looy
- Circuit Provençal Stage 4, Henri De Wolf
- Vuelta a España

Stage 1a, Edward Sels
Stage 2, Rik Van Looy
Stage 4a, Armand Desmet
Stage 10, Henri De Wolf

- Critérium du Dauphiné Libéré

Stage 3a, Bernard Van de Kerckhove
Stage 4b, Rik Van Looy

- Tour de Luxembourg Stage 4, Edward Sels
- Tour de France

Stage 1, 11, 14 & 19, Edward Sels
Stage 3a, Bernard Van de Kerckhove
Stage 5, Willy Derboven

- Paris–Luxembourg

Overall & Stage 1, Rik Van Looy
Stage 2, Edward Sels

=== 1965 – Solo–Superia ===
- Sassari–Cagliari, Rik Van Looy
- Omloop Het Volk, Noël De Pauw
- Gent–Wevelgem, Noël De Pauw
- Harelbeke–Antwerpen–Harelbeke, Rik Van Looy
- Elfstedenronde, Rik Van Looy
- Circuit Provençal

Stage 4b, Rik Van Looy
Stage 5, Roger Baguet

- Paris–Roubaix, Rik Van Looy
- Paris–Brussels, Edward Sels
- Vuelta a España

Stage 1, 2, 7, 9, 12, 14, 15 & 17, Rik Van Looy

- Tour de Luxembourg

Stage 2b & 4, Rik Van Looy

- Tour de France

Stage 1a & 19, Rik Van Looy
Stage 2, Bernard Van de Kerckhove
Stage 4, Edgard Sorgeloos
Stage 7, Edward Sels

- Paris–Luxembourg

Stage 2, Bernard Van de Kerckhove
Stage 4, Edward Sels

=== 1966 – Solo–Superia ===
- Paris–Nice Stage 4, Rik Van Looy
- Harelbeke–Antwerpen–Harelbeke, Rik Van Looy
- Tour of Flanders, Edward Sels
- Tour de Luxembourg Stage 3, Rik Van Looy
- Tour de France

Stage 6 & 22a, Edward Sels

- Tour of the Netherlands Stage 2, Rik Van Looy
- Volta a Catalunya, Julien Stevens
