= 1966 Tour of Flanders =

50th Tour of Flanders
Race details
- Dates: 9 April 1966
- Stages: 1
- Distance: 243 km (151.0 mi)
- Winning time: 5h 53' 00"

Results
	Winner	Edward Sels (BEL)	(Solo–Superia)
	Second	Adriano Durante (ITA)	(Salvarani)
	Third	Georges Vandenberghe (BEL)	(Romeo–Smiths)

The 50th Tour of Flanders cycling classic was held on Saturday, 9 April 1966. The race was won by Belgian rider Edward Sels in a sprint before Italian Adriano Durante. 60 of 151 riders finished.

== Route ==
The race started in Ghent and finished in Gentbrugge – covering 243 km. For the first time since the 1940s the Kwaremont climbs was not addressed because of road works. There were six categorized climbs:

- Kluisberg
- Kruisberg
- Edelareberg
- Valkenberg
- Kasteelstraat
- Kloosterstraat (Geraardsbergen)

== Results ==
Result
Rank	Rider	Team	Time
1	Edward Sels (BEL)	Solo–Superia	5h 53' 00"
2	Adriano Durante (ITA)	Salvarani	s.t.
3	Georges Vandenberghe (BEL)	Romeo–Smiths	s.t.
4	Guido Reybroeck (BEL)	Romeo–Smiths	s.t.
5	Willy Planckaert (BEL)	Romeo–Smiths	s.t.
6	Gianni Motta (ITA)	Molteni	s.t.
7	Willy Bocklant (BEL)	Mann–Grundig	s.t.
8	Jan Nolmans (BEL)	Mann–Grundig	s.t.
9	Vittorio Adorni (ITA)	Salvarani	s.t.
10	Felice Gimondi (ITA)	Salvarani	s.t.
