= Salvador Honrubia =

Spanish cyclist (born 1937)

Personal information
- Born: 1 January 1937 (age 89)

Cycling career
- Sport: Cycling
- Role: Rider

Salvador Honrubia (born 1 January 1937) is a Spanish racing cyclist. He rode in the 1964 Tour de France.
