= Robert Poulot =

French cyclist

Personal information
- Born: 5 July 1941 (age 85) Arrens-Marsous, France

Cycling career
- Sport: Cycling
- Role: Rider

Robert Poulot (born 5 July 1941) is a French racing cyclist. He rode in the 1964 Tour de France, earning 47th place overall and performing best in the 9th stage (Monaco), receiving 19th place. Earlier that season, he received 1st place in the Tour des Crombrailles. His professional seasons were 1964, 1965, and 1966.
