= Julio Jiménez (cyclist) =

Spanish cyclist (1934–2022)

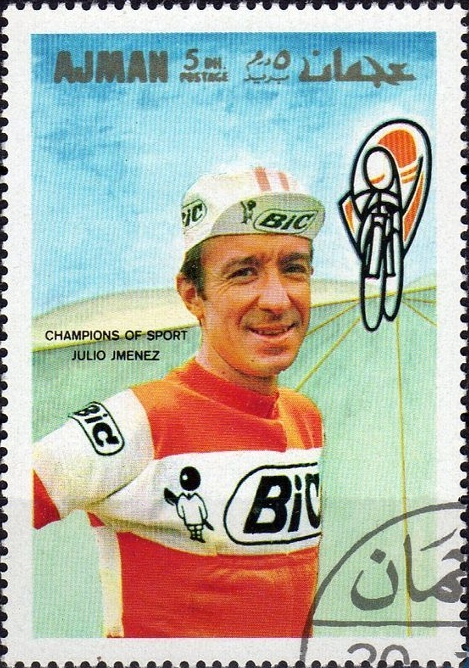
- Jiménez on a 1969 Emirate of Ajman postage stamp

Personal information
- Full name: Julio Jiménez Muñoz
- Nicknames: La pulga de Ávila (The Flea of Ávila); El Relojero de Ávila (The Watchmaker of Ávila)
- Born: 28 October 1934 Ávila, Spain
- Died: 8 June 2022 (aged 87) Ávila, Spain

Cycling career
- Sport: Cycling
- Current team: Retired
- Discipline: Road
- Role: Rider
- Rider type: Climber

Professional teams
- 1960–1961: Catigene
- 1962: Faema
- 1963: Flandria–Faema
- 1964–1965: Kas–Kaskol
- 1966: Ford France–Hutchinson
- 1967–1968: Bic
- 1969: Eliolona

Major wins
- Grand Tours Tour de France Mountains classification (1965, 1966, 1967) 5 individual stages (1964, 1965, 1966) 1 TTT stage (1964) Giro d'Italia 4 individual stage (1966, 1968) Vuelta a España Mountains classification (1963, 1964, 1965) 3 individual stages (1964, 1965) One-day races and Classics National Road Race Championships (1964)

Julio Jiménez Muñoz (28 October 1934 – 8 June 2022) was a Spanish professional road racing cyclist.

== Early life ==
Jiménez's father was an ambulance driver during Spain's Civil War, and later a chauffeur for a general in the Spanish army, who gave Jiménez his first bike as a gift. As an amateur rider, he won a stage at the 1960 Volta a Catalunya, which helped him earn his first professional contract.

== Career ==
Known as a climbing specialist, he won the King of the Mountains title six times at Grand Tours. He won five stages of the Tour de France in his career; stage 20 of the 1964 Tour de France was one of the most famous stages in TDF history due to the battle up the Puy-de-Dôme between Anquetil and Poulidor. This stage was won by Jiménez, who was able to cross the line 0:11 ahead of Spanish climber Federico Bahamontes, 0:57 ahead of Poulidor, 1:30 ahead of Vittorio Adorni and 1:39 ahead of Anquetil. Although beaten by Bahamontes in the Mountains classification at the 1964 Tour, Jiménez would win the Mountains classification at the next three Tours de France, also finishing second overall in 1967.

In 1965, he became one of (now) four riders to complete the Tour/Vuelta double by winning both Tour's mountains competition in the same year. He also wore the leaders jersey at the 1964 Vuelta; and the 1966 and 1968 Giro d'Italia. He retired after the 1969 season, returning to his home town of Avila where he opened a nightclub and restaurant. A short, steep pedestrianised street in Ávila, Cuesta de Julio Jiménez, is named in his honour.

In 2022, Jiménez died after a traffic accident.

== Major results ==
1960
1st Stage 5 Volta a Catalunya
1961
Vuelta a Colombia

1st Stages 6, 8, 9 & 11

1st Stage 1 (ITT) Eibarko Bizikleta
5th Campeonato Vasco Navarro de Montaña
5th GP Ayuntamiento de Bilbao
1962
1st Subida a Urkiola
1st Stage 4 Critérium du Dauphiné Libéré
1st Stage 5 Volta a Catalunya
2nd Subida a Arrate
1963
1st Mountains classification, Vuelta a España
4th GP Ayuntamiento de Bilbao
5th Mont Faron Hill Climb
8th Road race, National Road Championships
9th Trofeo Jaumendreu
1964
1st Road race, National Road Championships
1st Subida a Urkiola
2nd Overall Eibarko Bizikleta

1st Stage 4

5th Overall Vuelta a España

1st Mountains classification
1st Stages 5 & 14

5th GP Ayuntamiento de Bilbao
6th Subida a Arrate
7th Overall Tour de France

1st Stages 3b (TTT), 13 & 20

1965
1st Overall Subida a Arrate

1st Stage 2 (ITT)

1st Subida a Urkiola
Tour de France

1st Mountains classification
1st Stages 9 & 17

Vuelta a España

1st Mountains classification
1st Stage 10b

1966
Tour de France

1st Mountains classification
1st Stage 16

2nd Subida al Naranco
2nd Circuit d'Auvergne
4th Overall Giro d'Italia

1st Stages 2 & 15
Held after Stages 2–12

1967
1st Polymultipliée
1st Stage 3 Tour de Luxembourg
2nd Overall Tour de France

1st Mountains classification

2nd Mont Faron Hill Climb
3rd À travers Lausanne
1968
2nd Overall Vuelta a Mallorca

1st Stage 4a

2nd Overall Polymultipliée
10th Overall Giro d'Italia

1st Stages 9 & 18

=== Grand Tour general classification results timeline ===
Grand Tour	1960	1961	1962	1963	1964	1965	1966	1967	1968	1969
Vuelta a España	—	36	46	23	5	34	—	20	—	—
Giro d'Italia	—	—	—	—	—	—	4	—	10	36
Tour de France	—	—	—	—	7	23	13	2	30	—

Legend
—	Did not compete
DNF	Did not finish
