= GP Ayuntamiento de Bilbao =

Cycling race in Spain

Race details
- Region: Basque Country, Spain
- Discipline: Road race
- Type: Stage race (1943–1955); One-day race (1960–1964)

History
- First edition: 1943
- Editions: 11
- Final edition: 1964
- First winner: Martín Mancisidor (ESP)
- Most wins: No repeat winners
- Final winner: Manuel Martín Piñera (ESP)

The GP Ayuntamiento de Bilbao was a road bicycle race held annually in the Basque Country, Spain from 1945 until 1969. It was held as a stage race from 1943 to 1955 and as a one-day race from 1960 to 1964.

== Winners ==
Year	Winner	Second	Third
1943	(Spain) Martín Mancisidor	(Spain) Julián Berrendero	(Spain) Antonio Destrieux
1944	(Spain) José Gandara	(Spain) Isidro Bejarano	(Spain) Pedro Font
1945–1951	No race		
1952	(Spain) Senén Blanco	(Spain) Adolfo Cruz	(Spain) Andrés Trobat
1953	(Spain) Cosme Barrutia	(Spain) Miguel Bover	(Spain) Emilio Rodríguez
1954	(Spain) Ponciano Arbelaiz	(Spain) Antonio Barrutia	(Spain) Manuel Rodríguez Barros
1955	(Spain) Carmelo Morales	(Spain) Antonio Ferraz	(Spain) Juan Bibiloni
1956–1959	No race		
1960	(Spain) José Segú	(Spain) José Luis Talamillo	(Spain) Aniceto Utset
1961	(Spain) Juan José Sagarduy	(Spain) Jose Bernardez Boluja	(Spain) Federico Bahamontes
1962	(Spain) Eusebio Vélez	(Spain) Antonio Karmany	(Spain) Francisco Gabica
1963	(Spain) Roberto Morales	(Spain) José Antonio Momeñe	(Spain) Ventura Díaz Arrey
1964	(Spain) Manuel Martín Piñera	(Spain) José Antonio Momeñe	(Spain) Sebastián Elorza
