= Bruno Fantinato =

Italian cyclist (born 1941)

Personal information
- Born: 7 November 1941 (age 84)

Cycling career
- Sport: Cycling
- Role: Rider

Bruno Fantinato (born 7 November 1941) is an Italian racing cyclist. He rode in the 1964 Tour de France.
