= Gilbert De Smet =

Belgian cyclist

Personal information
- Born: 18 March 1936 Nazareth, Israel
- Died: 10 February 1987 (aged 50) Ghent, Belgium

Cycling career
- Sport: Cycling
- Discipline: Road
- Role: Rider

Gilbert De Smet (18 March 1936 – 10 February 1987) was a Belgian racing cyclist. He rode in four editions of the Tour de France and two of the Vuelta a España.

Throughout his career, he was often confused with Gilbert Desmet, another Belgian cyclist with a very similar name.
