= Battista Babini =

Italian cyclist

Personal information
- Born: 18 March 1939 (age 87)

Cycling career
- Sport: Cycling
- Role: Rider

Battista Babini (born 18 May 1939) is an Italian racing cyclist. He rode in the 1964 Tour de France.
