= Edward Sels =

Belgian cyclist (born 1941)

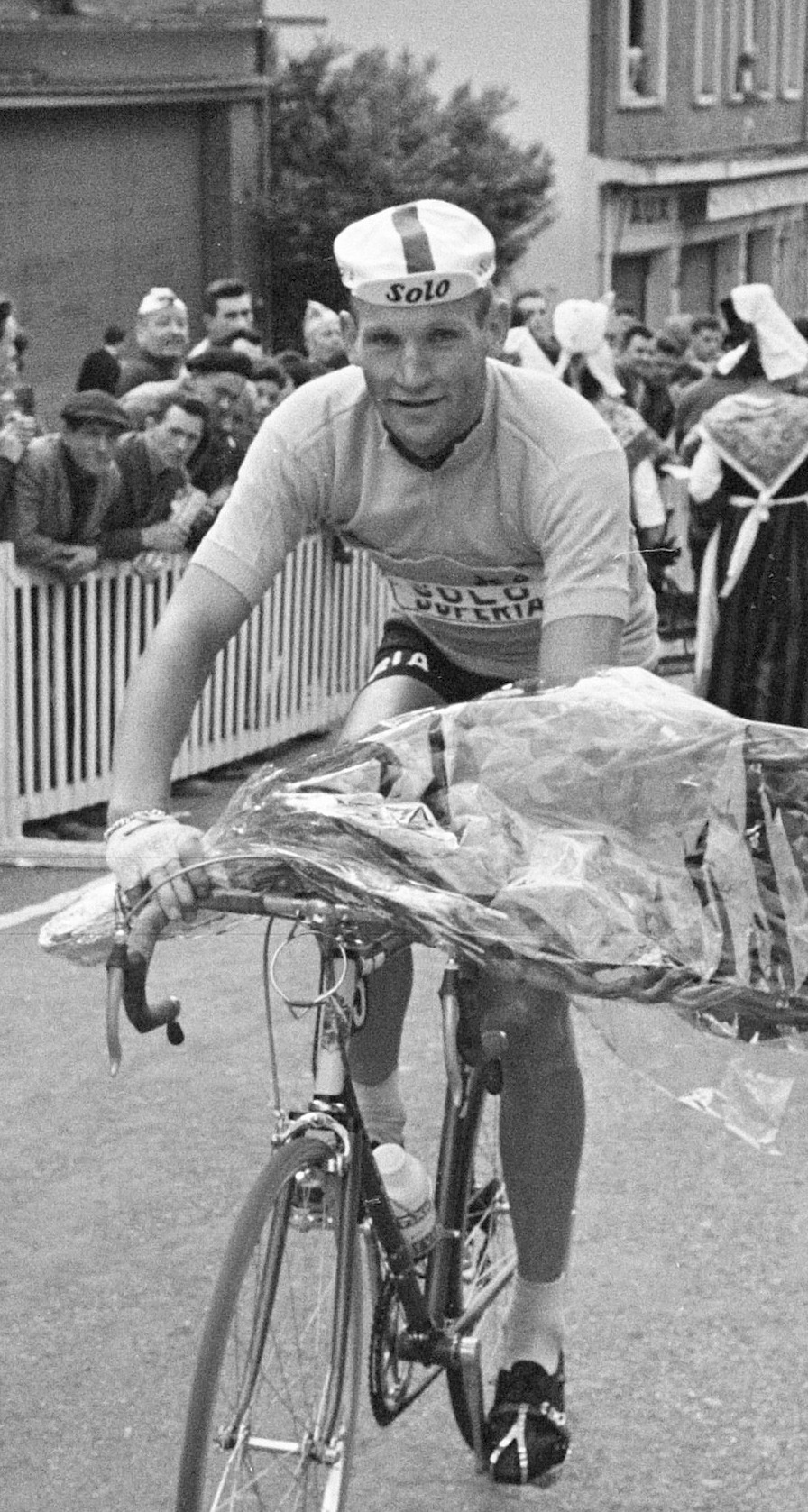
- Sels at the 1964 Tour de France

Personal information
- Full name: Edward Sels
- Nickname: Ward
- Born: 27 August 1941 (age 85) Vorselaar, Belgium

Cycling career
- Sport: Cycling
- Discipline: Road
- Role: Sprinter

Professional teams
- 1963: Libertas
- 1964–66: Solo–Superia
- 1967: Flandria–De Clerck
- 1968–69: Bic
- 1970: Willem II–Gazelle
- 1971: Möbel Märki-Bonanza
- 1971: Bika-Milupa
- 1972: Goldor–Ijsboerke

Major wins
- Grand Tours Tour de France 7 individual stages (1964, 1965, 1966) Giro d'Italia 1 individual stage (1968) Vuelta a España 2 individual stages (1964), (1969) One-day races and Classics National Road Race Championships (1964) Tour of Flanders (1966) Paris–Brussels (1965) Schaal Sels (1966, 1968) Scheldeprijs Vlaanderen (1968)

Edward Sels (born 27 August 1941 at Vorselaar, Belgium) is a former Belgian professional road bicycle racer. He was professional from 1963 to 1972, winning 35 races. He was road champion of Belgium in 1961 (Military) and 1964. He won seven stages in the Tour de France and one in the Giro d'Italia. He wore the yellow jersey for two days in the 1964 Tour de France. His sister, Rosa Sels, was a cyclist too.

== Major results ==
1961
1st Belgian Military Road Champion
1962
1st Ronde van Vlaanderen U23
1st Bruxelles–Zepperen, Sint-Lenaerts
3rd Coupe Marcel Indekeu
1963
1st Bruxelles-Liège (semi-professionals)
1st Courtrai-Gammerages
1st Antoing, Hoogstraten, Machelen, Sint-Lenaerts
1964
1st Road race, National Road Championships
Tour de France

1st stages 1, 11, 14 and 19
Held after Stages 1–2

Vuelta a España

1st stage 1a

8th Overall Paris–Nice

1st stage 1 & 9

1st stage 4 Tour de Luxembourg
1st stage 2 Paris–Luxembourg
1st Heusden Koers
1st Auvelais, Braine-le-Comte, Dendermonde, Herentals, Oostrozebeke, Opwijk, Sint-Lambrechts-Woluwe, Waregem
2nd Omloop van Oost-Vlaanderen
2nd Omloop van Limburg
2nd Critérium des As
2nd GP Dr. Eugeen Roggeman
3rd Omloop van Midden-Vlaanderen
3rd Bruxelles–Meulebeke
4th Tour of Flanders
8th Milan–San Remo
8th Omloop Het Volk
1965
1st Paris–Brussels
Tour de France

1st stage 7

1st stage 2 Giro di Sardegna
1st stage 3 Tour of Belgium
3rd Overall Paris–Luxembourg

1st stage 4

1st Grote Prijs Marcel Kint
1st Ath, Eeklo, Issoire, Lebbeke, Lokeren, Londerzeel, Mol, Saint-Claud, Westerlo, Zwevegem
2nd 1965 Paris–Roubaix
2nd Tour of Flanders
3rd Omloop Leiedal
3rd Super Prestige Pernod
5th 1965 Gent–Wevelgem
1966
Tour of Flanders
1st Schaal Sels
1st GP Roeselare
1st Aalst
1st Herentals
1st Laarne
1st Libramont
Tour de France:

1st stages 6 and 22a

1st Mol, Rumbeke, Sint-Lambrechts-Woluwe, Stabroek
2nd Elfstedenronde
3rd Circuit du Brabant central
1967
1st Road race, National Interclubs Championships
1st Ronde van Limburg
Vuelta a Andalucía

1st stage 1, 3, 4 & 7

1st stage 5 Four Days of Dunkirk
1st Grand Prix of Aargau Canton
1st stage 2a & 5a Grand Prix Sul
1st GP Dr. Eugeen Roggeman
1st Circuit des Frontières
1st Antwerpse pijl, Breendonk, Essen, Garancières-en-Beauce, Kalmthout, Stekene, Tessenderlo, Westerlo
3rd Omloop Het Volk
3rd 1965 Gent–Wevelgem
3rd Grote Prijs Marcel Kint
5th 1965 Paris–Roubaix
10h Bordeaux–Paris
1968
1st stage 4 Giro d'Italia
1st stage 5 Four Days of Dunkirk
1st Scheldeprijs Vlaanderen
1st Schaal Sels
1st Auvelais, Herne, Honselersdijk, Sint-Katelijne-Waver, Sint-Niklaas
2nd Grand Prix de Saint-Tropez
3rd Kuurne–Brussels–Kuurne
3rd Grand Prix de Saint-Raphaël
4th Milan–San Remo
4th 1965 Paris–Roubaix
1969
Vuelta a España:

1st stage 6

3rd Puivelde Koersel
1970
1st Knokke
3rd Omloop van de Fruitstreek
