= Noël De Pauw =

Belgian cyclist

Personal information
- Born: 25 July 1942 Sint-Denijs-Boekel, Belgium
- Died: 13 April 2015 (aged 72) Zaventem, Belgium

Cycling career
- Sport: Cycling
- Role: Rider

Noël De Pauw (25 July 1942 – 13 April 2015) was a Belgian professional racing cyclist. He won the Omloop Het Nieuwsblad in 1965.
