= Esteban Martín =

Spanish cyclist

Personal information
- Born: 1 January 1937
- Died: 25 August 1995 (aged 58)

Cycling career
- Sport: Cycling
- Role: Rider

Esteban Martín (1 January 1937 – 25 August 1995) was a Spanish racing cyclist. He rode in the 1963 Tour de France.
