= Margnat (cycling team) =

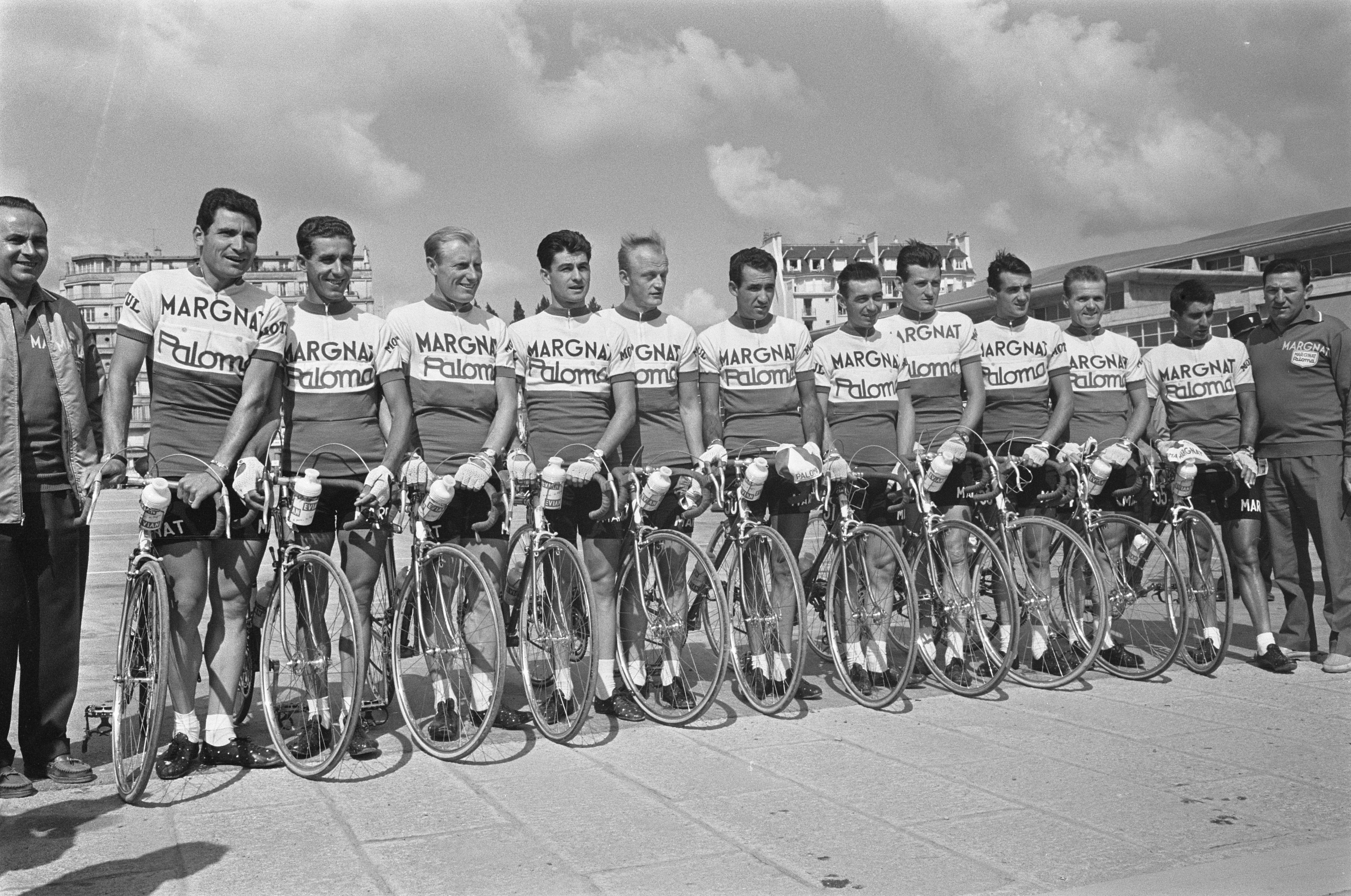
- The Margnat–Paloma–Dunlop squad of the 1964 Tour de France

Team information
- Registered: France
- Founded: 1958
- Disbanded: 1965
- Discipline: Road

Key personnel
- General manager: Raoul Rémy

Team name history
- 1958 1959 1960 1961 1962 1963–1964 1965: Coupry–Margnat; Rochet–Margnat–BP–Dunlop; Coupry–Margnat; Margnat–Rochet–Dunlop; Margnat–Paloma–D'Alessandro; Margnat–Paloma–Dunlop; Margnat–Paloma–Inuri–Dunlop

Margnat was a French professional cycling team that existed from 1958 to 1965. Its main sponsor was French winemaker Margnat. Federico Bahamontes won three successive Tour de France mountains classifications with the team (1962, 1963 and 1964).
