= Hans Junkermann (cyclist) =

German cyclist (1934–2022)

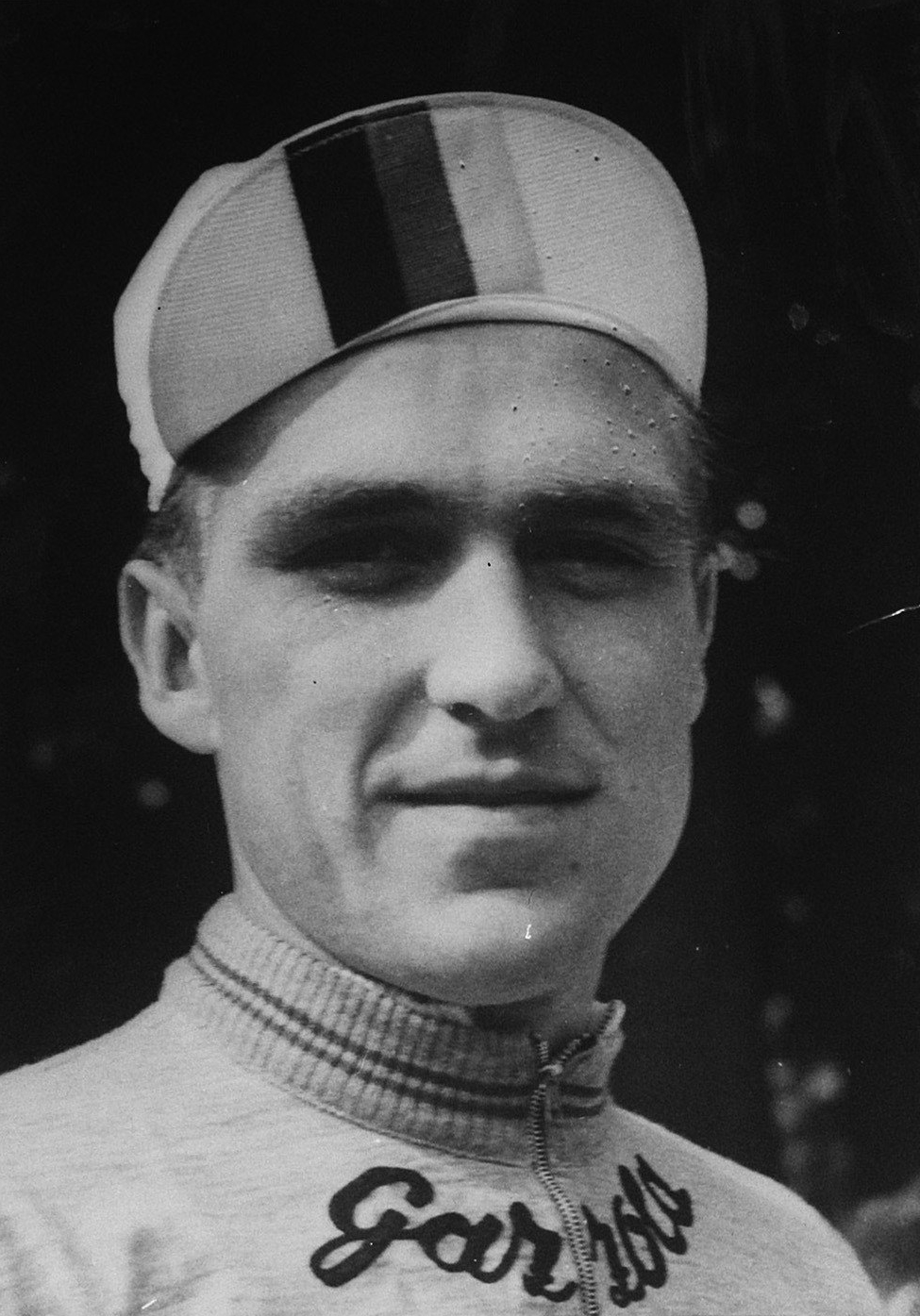
- Junkermann in 1962

Personal information
- Born: 5 June 1934 St. Tönis, Rhine Province, Prussia, Germany
- Died: 11 April 2022 (aged 87) Krefeld, North Rhine-Westphalia, Germany

Cycling career
- Sport: Cycling
- Discipline: Road racing/track racing
- Role: Rider

Hans "Hennes" Junkermann (6 May 1934 – 11 April 2022) was a German professional racing cyclist who won 35 road races in 18 seasons from 1956 to 1973. He won the German National Road Race in 1959, 1960, and 1961.

== Biography ==
Junkermann was born in St. Tönis, near Krefeld, Rhine Province. He excelled in mountainous stage races and hard one-day events. He won nine Six Day races and the European Madison championship in 1965. He rode the Tour de France eight times.

Junkermann showed class as an amateur and was approached twice in 1954 to defect to the GDR and become a paid amateur, but he wanted to stay in West Germany and be a professional. He turned professional in 1955 season for the small Bauer team.

In May 1957 he won Züri-Metzgete, followed by fourth in the Tour de Suisse, the start of his excellent record in the Swiss tour, a hilly stage race. In 1959 he moved to Faema-Molteni under Rik Van Looy, winning the national road championship, a feat he repeated in 1960 and 1961. He won his first Tour de Suisse in 1959 after finishing second the previous year.

Defensive riding and no support from his team stopped him from winning the Tour de France. He came fourth in 1960 and fifth in 1961. He abandoned in 1962, claiming his food was tampered with in Luchon.

Junkermann came second in the 1961 Tour of Germany and sixth in the Giro d'Italia. In 1962 he switched to Wiel's-Groene Leeuw with 1963 world champion Benoni Beheyt of Belgium. Junkermann won the 1962 Tour de Suisse and came third in La Flèche Wallonne. In 1963 he won the Rund um den Henninger Turm in Frankfurt. This was the 29-year-old's last big victory on the road although his career continued for a further ten years. His best results in latter years were 11th in the 1967 Tour de France and 7th in the 1965 Vuelta a España. In 1964 he won six-day races at Essen, Cologne and Frankfurt, riding with specialists Peter Post and Rudi Altig.

After retirement in 1973 Junkermann coached young riders for 25 years, first with the RSV City Neuwied cycling team and between 1984 and 1998 with Olympia Dortmund. At Dortmund, he brought Erik Zabel, Udo Bolts, Rolf Aldag, Kai Hundertmarck and Bernd Groene through the ranks to become professionals.

Junkermann lived in Krefeld and at 70 was still riding several hundred kilometres a week. He died on 11 April 2022, at the age of 87.

== Major results ==
Road

- 1957: Züri-Metzgete
- 1958: Tour de Suisse (one stage)
- 1959: Tour de Suisse (overall and one stage), German RR Champion
- 1960: German RR Champion
- 1961: German RR Champion
- 1962: Tour de Suisse (overall and two stages), Dauphiné Libéré (one stage)
- 1963: Rund um den Henninger Turm

Six Day victories

- 1960: Cologne (with Klaus Bugdahl), Dortmund (with Klaus Bugdahl), Münster (with Fritz Pfenninger)
- 1962: Berlin (with Rudi Altig), Munster (with Rudi Altig)
- 1963: Essen (with Rudi Altig)
- 1964: Essen (with Rudi Altig), Frankfurt (with Rudi Altig), Cologne (with Peter Post)

== See also ==
- List of doping cases in cycling#1962
