= Pelforth–Sauvage–Lejeune =

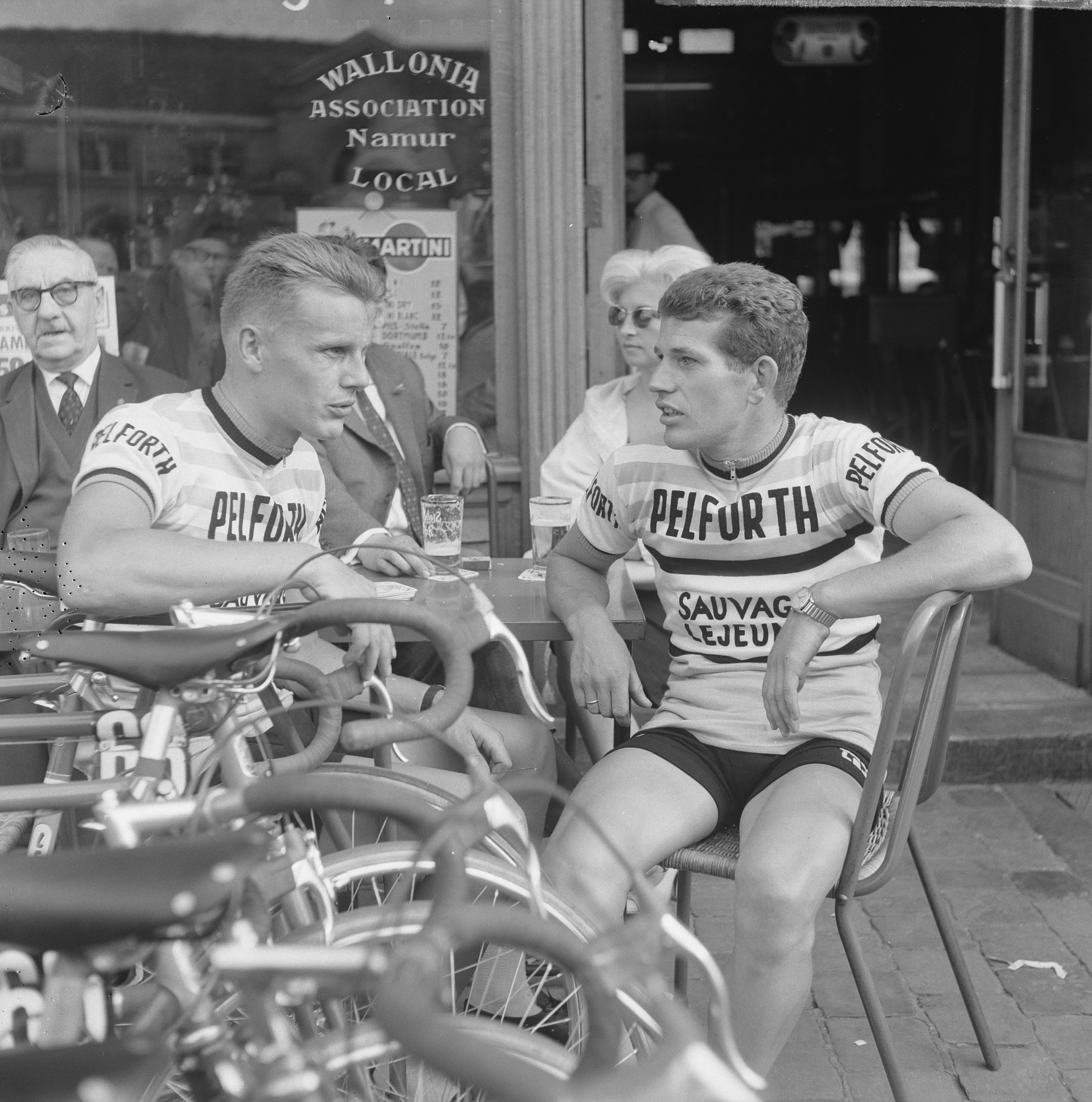
- Pelforth–Sauvage–Lejeune riders Jan Janssen and Dick Enthoven at the 1963 Tour de France

Team information
- Registered: France
- Founded: 1960
- Disbanded: 1968
- Discipline: Road

Team name history
- 1960 1961 1962–1968: Pelforth 43–Carlier; Sauvage–Lejeune–Pelforth 43; Pelforth–Sauvage–Lejeune

Pelforth–Sauvage–Lejeune was a French professional cycling team that existed from 1960 to 1968. Jan Janssen won the 1968 Tour de France with the team.
