= List of teams and cyclists in the 1966 Vuelta a España =

For the 1966 Vuelta a España, the field consisted of 90 riders; 55 finished the race.

== By rider ==
Legend
| No. | Starting number worn by the rider during the Vuelta |
| Pos. | Position in the general classification |
| Time | Deficit to the winner of the general classification |
| DNF | Denotes a rider who did not finish |

| No. | Name | Nationality | Team | Pos. | Time | Ref |
|---|---|---|---|---|---|---|
| 1 | José Bernárdez | Spain | Olimpia | 41 | + 36' 34" | |
| 2 | Jaime Mateu Ramis | Spain | Olimpia | DNF | — | |
| 3 | Jaime Fullana Rossello | Spain | Olimpia | 47 | + 52' 18" | |
| 4 | Miguel Pacheco | Spain | Olimpia | DNF | — | |
| 5 | Ignacio Morata Teruel | Spain | Olimpia | DNF | — | |
| 6 | Antonio Saban Torrego | Spain | Olimpia | 40 | + 35' 34" | |
| 7 | Juan Sánchez Camero | Spain | Olimpia | 35 | + 30' 52" | |
| 8 | Fulgencio Sánchez | Spain | Olimpia | DNF | — | |
| 9 | Jesús Manzaneque | Spain | Olimpia | 32 | + 28' 46" | |
| 10 | José Urrestarazu Munduate | Spain | Olimpia | 44 | + 41' 29" | |
| 11 | Jo de Roo | Netherlands | Televizier-Batavus | DNF | — | |
| 12 | Cees Haast | Netherlands | Televizier-Batavus | 8 | + 3' 55" | |
| 13 | Leo van Dongen | Netherlands | Televizier-Batavus | DNF | — | |
| 14 | Leo Knops | Netherlands | Televizier-Batavus | 29 | + 26' 54" | |
| 15 | Gerben Karstens | Netherlands | Televizier-Batavus | 21 | + 20' 49" | |
| 16 | Bas Maliepaard | Netherlands | Televizier-Batavus | DNF | — | |
| 17 | Henk Nijdam | Netherlands | Televizier-Batavus | 22 | + 21' 14" | |
| 18 | Jos van der Vleuten | Netherlands | Televizier-Batavus | 17 | + 12' 48" | |
| 19 | Rik Wouters | Netherlands | Televizier-Batavus | 24 | + 22' 11" | |
| 20 | Huub Zilverberg | Netherlands | Televizier-Batavus | 26 | + 22' 42" | |
| 21 | José Pérez Francés | Spain | Ferrys | DNF | — | |
| 22 | Eduardo Castelló | Spain | Ferrys | 16 | + 10' 24" | |
| 23 | Angelino Soler | Spain | Ferrys | 9 | + 4' 37" | |
| 24 | José Suria Cutrina | Spain | Ferrys | 33 | + 29' 50" | |
| 25 | Ángel Ibáñez | Spain | Ferrys | DNF | — | |
| 26 | Francisco José Suñé Montragull | Spain | Ferrys | DNF | — | |
| 27 | Ramón Sáez Marzo | Spain | Ferrys | 19 | + 18' 24" | |
| 28 | Antonio Bertrán Panadés | Spain | Ferrys | 36 | + 31' 18" | |
| 29 | Raúl Rey Fomosel | Spain | Ferrys | 38 | + 32' 18" | |
| 30 | Juan García Such | Spain | Ferrys | 48 | + 58' 40" | |
| 31 | Robert De Middeleir | Belgium | Libertas | DNF | — | |
| 32 | Roger De Breuker | Belgium | Libertas | DNF | — | |
| 33 | Achiel Van De Weyer | Belgium | Libertas | DNF | — | |
| 34 | Bruno Sivilotti | Italy | Libertas | DNF | — | |
| 35 | Roger de Wilde | Belgium | Libertas | DNF | — | |
| 36 | Alfons Hermans | Belgium | Libertas | DNF | — | |
| 37 | Norbert Meeuws | Belgium | Libertas | DNF | — | |
| 38 | Bernard De Ville | Belgium | Libertas | DNF | — | |
| 39 | Jerome Kegels | Belgium | Libertas | DNF | — | |
| 40 | Romain Robben | Belgium | Libertas | DNF | — | |
| 41 | José Carlos Cardoso Sousa | Portugal | Oporto | DNF | — | |
| 42 | Joaquim Leão | Portugal | Oporto | 30 | + 26' 57" | |
| 43 | Indalecio De Jesus | Portugal | Oporto | DNF | — | |
| 44 | Mário Silva | Portugal | Oporto | DNF | — | |
| 45 | Alberto Carvalho | Portugal | Oporto | 28 | + 26' 46" | |
| 46 | Cosme De Oliveira | Portugal | Oporto | 54 | + 1h 21' 34" | |
| 47 | Joaquim Freitas | Portugal | Oporto | DNF | — | |
| 48 | Manuel Castro | Portugal | Oporto | DNF | — | |
| 49 | José Pinto | Portugal | Oporto | DNF | — | |
| 50 | João Palma | Portugal | Oporto | DNF | — | |
| 51 | Carlos Echeverría | Spain | Kas | 3 | + 44" | |
| 52 | Francisco Gabica | Spain | Kas | 1 | 78' 53' 55" | |
| 53 | Juan María Uribezubia | Spain | Kas | 20 | + 20' 06" | |
| 54 | Sebastián Elorza | Spain | Kas | 11 | + 5' 56" | |
| 55 | Antonio Gómez del Moral | Spain | Kas | 7 | + 3' 52" | |
| 56 | Manuel Martín Piñera | Spain | Kas | 49 | + 59' 43" | |
| 57 | José Antonio Momeñe | Spain | Kas | 5 | + 2' 25" | |
| 58 | Gregorio San Miguel | Spain | Kas | 13 | + 6' 27" | |
| 59 | Valentín Uriona | Spain | Kas | 6 | + 2' 44" | |
| 60 | Eusebio Vélez | Spain | Kas | 2 | + 39" | |
| 61 | Eddy Pauwels | Belgium | Wiels-Groene-Gancia | DNF | — | |
| 62 | Leon Gevaert | Belgium | Wiels-Groene-Gancia | 52 | + 1h 10' 11" | |
| 63 | Gilbert Desmet | Belgium | Wiels-Groene-Gancia | 31 | + 27' 19" | |
| 64 | Jozef Timmerman | Belgium | Wiels-Groene-Gancia | 34 | + 30' 41" | |
| 65 | Dieter Puschel | West Germany | Wiels-Groene-Gancia | 25 | + 22' 26" | |
| 66 | August Verhaegen | Belgium | Wiels-Groene-Gancia | DNF | — | |
| 67 | Hubert Criel | Belgium | Wiels-Groene-Gancia | 43 | + 40' 17" | |
| 68 | Clément Roman | Belgium | Wiels-Groene-Gancia | 46 | + 48' 39" | |
| 69 | Eric Demunster | Belgium | Wiels-Groene-Gancia | 51 | + 1h 10' 04" | |
| 70 | Artemio Vanughi | Italy | Wiels-Groene-Gancia | 50 | + 1h 03' 12" | |
| 71 | Luis Otaño | Spain | Fagor | 4 | + 2' 17" | |
| 72 | Domingo Perurena | Spain | Fagor | 12 | + 6' 11" | |
| 73 | Jorge Mariné | Spain | Fagor | 27 | + 25' 20" | |
| 74 | Mariano Díaz | Spain | Fagor | 14 | + 7' 37" | |
| 75 | José Manuel López | Spain | Fagor | 15 | + 10' 05" | |
| 76 | Esteban Martín Jiménez | Spain | Fagor | DNF | — | |
| 77 | Jaime Alomar | Spain | Fagor | DNF | — | |
| 78 | José María Errandonea | Spain | Fagor | 10 | + 4' 40" | |
| 79 | Ramón Mendiburu | Spain | Fagor | 37 | + 32' 05" | |
| 80 | Luis Santamarina | Spain | Fagor | 23 | + 22' 08" | |
| 81 | Mario Zanin | Italy | Italy | DNF | — | |
| 82 | Livio Trapè | Italy | Italy | 45 | + 46' 28" | |
| 83 | Aldo Moser | Italy | Italy | 18 | + 16' 43" | |
| 84 | Renato Bongioni | Italy | Italy | 53 | + 1h 16' 40" | |
| 85 | Enzo Pretolani | Italy | Italy | 55 | + 1h 49' 47" | |
| 86 | Vittorio Casati | Italy | Italy | 42 | + 38' 51" | |
| 87 | Mario Drago | Italy | Italy | DNF | — | |
| 88 | Pasquale Fabbri | Italy | Italy | DNF | — | |
| 89 | Danilo Ferrari | Italy | Italy | 39 | + 38' 04" | |
| 90 | Oreste Magni | Italy | Italy | DNF | — | |
