= List of teams and cyclists in the 1967 Vuelta a España =

For the 1967 Vuelta a España, the field consisted of 110 riders; 73 finished the race.

== By rider ==
Legend
No.	Starting number worn by the rider during the Vuelta
Pos.	Position in the general classification
Time	Deficit to the winner of the general classification
DNF	Denotes a rider who did not finish

No.	Name	Nationality	Team	Pos.	Time	Ref
1	Francisco Gabica	Spain	Kas	DNF	—	
2	Antonio Gómez del Moral	Spain	Kas	19	+ 12' 01"	
3	Carlos Echeverria	Spain	Kas	16	+ 9' 16"	
4	José Pérez Francés	Spain	Kas	10	+ 6' 04"	
5	Joaquim Galera	Spain	Kas	DNF	—	
6	Gregorio San Miguel	Spain	Kas	7	+ 4' 19"	
7	Aurelio González Puente	Spain	Kas	3	+ 1' 45"	
8	Vicente López Carril	Spain	Kas	14	+ 8' 09"	
9	José Luis Uribezubia	Spain	Kas	37	+ 25' 36"	
10	Eusebio Vélez	Spain	Kas	17	+ 9' 47"	
11	André Foucher	France	Mercier-BP	48	+ 40' 10"	
12	Raymond Poulidor	France	Mercier-BP	8	+ 4' 20"	
13	Georges Chappe	France	Mercier-BP	56	+ 53' 34"	
14	Barry Hoban	Great Britain	Mercier-BP	DNF	—	
15	Robert Cazala	France	Mercier-BP	73	+ 2h 09' 41"	
16	Francis Campaner	France	Mercier-BP	DNF	—	
17	Eddy Beugels	Netherlands	Mercier-BP	DNF	—	
18	Jozef Spruyt	Belgium	Mercier-BP	52	+ 46' 52"	
19	Hubert Ferrer	France	Mercier-BP	72	+ 2h 06' 15"	
20	Gilbert Bellone	France	Mercier-BP	42	+ 32' 39"	
21	Guido Reybrouck	Belgium	Romeo-Smith's	DNF	—	
22	Gilbert Desmet	Belgium	Romeo-Smith's	DNF	—	
23	Edy Schütz	Luxembourg	Romeo-Smith's	DNF	—	
24	Roland Van De Rijse	Belgium	Romeo-Smith's	61	+ 1h 07' 40"	
25	Cees Lute	Netherlands	Romeo-Smith's	DNF	—	
26	Bas Maliepaard	Netherlands	Romeo-Smith's	30	+ 22' 12"	
27	Willy Van den Eynde	Belgium	Romeo-Smith's	DNF	—	
28	Jan Lauwers	Belgium	Romeo-Smith's	DNF	—	
29	Wim de Jager	Netherlands	Romeo-Smith's	DNF	—	
30	Michel Jacquemin	Belgium	Romeo-Smith's	46	+ 38' 33"	
31	Fernando Manzaneque	Spain	Ferrys	18	+ 11' 14"	
32	Ramón Sáez Marzo	Spain	Ferrys	39	+ 28' 04"	
33	Eduardo Castelló	Spain	Ferrys	38	+ 26' 00"	
34	Ventura Díaz	Spain	Ferrys	43	+ 32' 42"	
35	José Suria Cutrina	Spain	Ferrys	36	+ 25' 21"	
36	Juan Daniel Perera Ruiz	Spain	Ferrys	45	+ 36' 40"	
37	José Antonio Pontón Ruiz	Spain	Ferrys	12	+ 6' 17"	
38	Jesús Manzaneque	Spain	Ferrys	44	+ 32' 49"	
39	Ángel Ibáñez	Spain	Ferrys	41	+ 32' 09"	
40	Salvador Canet García	Spain	Ferrys	47	+ 38' 44"	
41	Jan Janssen	Netherlands	Pelforth–Sauvage–Lejeune	1	76h 38' 04"	
42	Bernard Van de Kerckhove	Belgium	Pelforth–Sauvage–Lejeune	57	+ 54' 52"	
43	Fernand Etter	France	Pelforth–Sauvage–Lejeune	64	+ 1h 12' 19"	
44	Georges Groussard	France	Pelforth–Sauvage–Lejeune	DNF	—	
45	Édouard Delberghe	France	Pelforth–Sauvage–Lejeune	49	+ 40' 55"	
46	Jean-Pierre Ducasse	France	Pelforth–Sauvage–Lejeune	2	+ 1' 43"	
47	Johny Schleck	Luxembourg	Pelforth–Sauvage–Lejeune	40	+ 28' 53"	
48	Julien Delocht	Belgium	Pelforth–Sauvage–Lejeune	65	+ 1h 16' 21"	
49	André Van Espen	Belgium	Pelforth–Sauvage–Lejeune	DNF	—	
50	Maurice Izier	France	Pelforth–Sauvage–Lejeune	55	+ 53' 24"	
51	Evert Dolman	Netherlands	Televizier-Batavus	54	+ 52' 38"	
52	Gerben Karstens	Netherlands	Televizier-Batavus	51	+ 46' 07"	
53	Cees Haast	Netherlands	Televizier-Batavus	5	+ 3' 20"	
54	Henk Nijdam	Netherlands	Televizier-Batavus	59	+ 59' 37"	
55	Jos van der Vleuten	Netherlands	Televizier-Batavus	50	+ 43' 40"	
56	Huub Zilverberg	Netherlands	Televizier-Batavus	28	+ 19' 07"	
57	Leo van Dongen	Netherlands	Televizier-Batavus	66	+ 1h 25' 17"	
58	Bart Zoet	Netherlands	Televizier-Batavus	DNF	—	
59	Jan Harings	Netherlands	Televizier-Batavus	26	+ 15' 40"	
60	Cees Snepvangers	Netherlands	Televizier-Batavus	69	+ 1h 45' 03"	
61	Angelino Soler	Spain	Karpy	11	+ 6' 12"	
62	Jesús Isasi Aspiazu	Spain	Karpy	DNF	—	
63	Jaime Fullana Rossello	Spain	Karpy	DNF	—	
64	Francisco José Juan Granell	Spain	Karpy	34	+ 24' 51"	
65	Enrique Sanchidrian Pacho	Spain	Karpy	DNF	—	
66	José Bernárdez	Spain	Karpy	60	+ 1h 03' 44"	
67	Andrés Incera Paradelo	Spain	Karpy	DNF	—	
68	Domingo Fernández	Spain	Karpy	DNF	—	
69	Antonio Blanco Martínez	Spain	Karpy	DNF	—	
70	Eugenio Lisarde Pérez	Spain	Karpy	DNF	—	
71	Guido De Rosso	Italy	Vittadello	DNF	—	
72	Michele Dancelli	Italy	Vittadello	DNF	—	
73	Aldo Moser	Italy	Vittadello	25	+ 15' 19"	
74	Ambrogio Portalupi	Italy	Vittadello	DNF	—	
75	Severino Andreoli	Italy	Vittadello	DNF	—	
76	Wladimiro Panizza	Italy	Vittadello	DNF	—	
77	Marino Vigna	Italy	Vittadello	63	+ 1h 10' 40"	
78	Giovanni Knapp	Italy	Vittadello	DNF	—	
79	Silvano Schiavon	Italy	Vittadello	22	+ 13' 03"	
80	Domenico Meldolesi	Italy	Vittadello	DNF	—	
81	Mariano Díaz	Spain	Fagor	9	+ 5' 54"	
82	José María Errandonea	Spain	Fagor	23	+ 13' 33"	
83	Valentín Uriona	Spain	Fagor	31	+ 22' 51"	
84	José Manuel López	Spain	Fagor	6	+ 3' 41"	
85	Domingo Perurena	Spain	Fagor	DNF	—	
86	José Antonio Momeñe	Spain	Fagor	DNF	—	
87	Luis Otaño	Spain	Fagor	4	+ 2' 39"	
88	Ginés García Perán	Spain	Fagor	24	+ 14' 27"	
89	Ramón Mendiburu Ibarburu	Spain	Fagor	21	+ 12' 31"	
90	Jesús Aranzabal	Spain	Fagor	58	+ 55' 43"	
91	Tom Simpson	Great Britain	Peugeot	33	+ 24' 46"	
92	Christian Raymond	France	Peugeot	DNF	—	
93	Theo Mertens	Belgium	Peugeot	67	+ 1h 44' 35"	
94	Désiré Letort	France	Peugeot	27	+ 16' 42"	
95	André Bayssière	France	Peugeot	70	+ 1h 45' 52"	
96	Raymond Delisle	France	Peugeot	DNF	—	
97	André Zimmermann	France	Peugeot	29	+ 19' 15"	
98	Jean Dumont	France	Peugeot	35	+ 25' 13"	
99	Hubert Niel	France	Peugeot	62	+ 1h 10' 38"	
100	Charly Grosskost	France	Peugeot	DNF	—	
101	Julio Jiménez	Spain	Bic	20	+ 12' 11"	
102	Rolf Wolfshohl	West Germany	Bic	15	+ 8' 54"	
103	Arie den Hartog	Netherlands	Bic	13	+ 6' 58"	
104	Jean-Claude Theillière	France	Bic	32	+ 23' 15"	
105	Jean Graczyk	France	Bic	71	+ 1h 50' 17"	
106	Jean Milesi	France	Bic	DNF	—	
107	Raymond Riotte	France	Bic	53	+ 51' 36"	
108	Serge Bolley	France	Bic	68	+ 1h 44' 51"	
109	Christian Leduc	France	Bic	DNF	—	
110	Pierre Campagnaro	France	Bic	DNF	—	
