= 1966 Vuelta a España, Stage 10a to Stage 18 =

Long-distance bicycle race stages

The 1966 Vuelta a España was the 21st edition of the Vuelta a España, one of cycling's Grand Tours. The Vuelta began in Murcia on 28 April, and Stage 10a occurred on 7 May with a stage from Sitges. The race finished in Bilbao on 15 May.

== Stage 10a ==
7 May 1966 - Sitges to Barcelona, 40 km (24.9 mi)

Route:

Stage 10a result

| Rank | Rider | Team | Time |
|---|---|---|---|
| 1 | Luis Otaño (ESP) | Fagor | 58' 50" |
| 2 | Pasquale Fabbri (ITA) | Italy | + 10" |
| 3 | Henk Nijdam (NED) | Televizier–Batavus | + 20" |
| 4 | Jo de Roo (NED) | Televizier–Batavus | s.t. |
| 5 | Gerben Karstens (NED) | Televizier–Batavus | s.t. |
| 6 | Mario Zanin (ITA) | Italy | s.t. |
| 7 | Ramón Sáez Marzo (ESP) | Ferrys | s.t. |
| 8 | Cees Haast (NED) | Televizier–Batavus | s.t. |
| 9 | Jos van der Vleuten (NED) | Televizier–Batavus | s.t. |
| 10 | Bas Maliepaard (NED) | Televizier–Batavus | s.t. |

== Stage 10b ==
7 May 1966 - Barcelona to Barcelona, 49 km (30.4 mi)

Route:

Stage 10b result

| Rank | Rider | Team | Time |
|---|---|---|---|
| 1 | Henk Nijdam (NED) | Televizier–Batavus | 1h 10' 38" |
| 2 | Pasquale Fabbri (ITA) | Italy | + 10" |
| 3 | José María Errandonea (ESP) | Fagor | + 20" |
| 4 | Gerben Karstens (NED) | Televizier–Batavus | s.t. |
| 5 | Danilo Ferrari (ITA) | Italy | s.t. |
| 6 | Artemio Vanughi (ITA) | Wiel's–Gancia-Groene Leeuw | s.t. |
| 7 | Cees Haast (NED) | Televizier–Batavus | s.t. |
| 8 | Jos van der Vleuten (NED) | Televizier–Batavus | s.t. |
| 9 | Jo de Roo (NED) | Televizier–Batavus | s.t. |
| 10 | Antonio Bertrán Panadés (ESP) | Ferrys | s.t. |

General classification after Stage 10b

| Rank | Rider | Team | Time |
|---|---|---|---|
| 1 | Valentín Uriona (ESP) | Kas–Kaskol | 38h 38' 44" |
| 2 | Carlos Echeverría (ESP) | Kas–Kaskol | s.t. |
| 3 | Antonio Gómez del Moral (ESP) | Kas–Kaskol | + 7" |
| 4 | José Antonio Momeñe (ESP) | Kas–Kaskol | + 13" |
| 5 | Cees Haast (NED) | Televizier–Batavus | + 30" |
| 6 | Francisco Gabica (ESP) | Kas–Kaskol | + 33" |
| 7 | Bas Maliepaard (NED) | Televizier–Batavus | + 55" |
| 8 | Eusebio Vélez (ESP) | Kas–Kaskol | + 1' 04" |
| 9 | Angelino Soler (ESP) | Ferrys | + 1' 05" |
| 10 | Sebastián Elorza (ESP) | Kas–Kaskol | + 1' 16" |

== Stage 11 ==
8 May 1966 - Barcelona to Huesca, 266 km (165.3 mi)

Route:

Stage 11 result

| Rank | Rider | Team | Time |
|---|---|---|---|
| 1 | Mario Zanin (ITA) | Italy | 8h 10' 13" |
| 2 | Gerben Karstens (NED) | Televizier–Batavus | + 20" |
| 3 | Domingo Perurena (ESP) | Fagor | + 40" |
| 4 | Pasquale Fabbri (ITA) | Italy | s.t. |
| 5 | Jos van der Vleuten (NED) | Televizier–Batavus | s.t. |
| 6 | Hubert Criel (BEL) | Wiel's–Gancia-Groene Leeuw | s.t. |
| 7 | Jo de Roo (NED) | Televizier–Batavus | s.t. |
| 8 | Renato Bongioni (ITA) | Italy | s.t. |
| 9 | Jaime Alomar (ESP) | Fagor | s.t. |
| 10 | Danilo Ferrari (ITA) | Italy | s.t. |

General classification after Stage 11

| Rank | Rider | Team | Time |
|---|---|---|---|
| 1 | Valentín Uriona (ESP) | Kas–Kaskol | 46h 49' 37" |
| 2 | Carlos Echeverría (ESP) | Kas–Kaskol | s.t. |
| 3 | Antonio Gómez del Moral (ESP) | Kas–Kaskol | + 7" |
| 4 | José Antonio Momeñe (ESP) | Kas–Kaskol | + 13" |
| 5 | Cees Haast (NED) | Televizier–Batavus | + 30" |
| 6 | Francisco Gabica (ESP) | Kas–Kaskol | + 33" |
| 7 | Bas Maliepaard (NED) | Televizier–Batavus | + 55" |
| 8 | Eusebio Vélez (ESP) | Kas–Kaskol | + 1' 04" |
| 9 | Angelino Soler (ESP) | Ferrys | + 1' 05" |
| 10 | Sebastián Elorza (ESP) | Kas–Kaskol | + 1' 16" |

== Stage 12 ==
9 May 1966 - Huesca to Pamplona, 221 km (137.3 mi)

Route:

== Stage 13 ==
10 May 1966 - Pamplona to San Sebastián, 131 km (81 mi)

Stage 13 result

| Rank | Rider | Team | Time |
|---|---|---|---|
| 1 | Cees Haast (NED) | Televizier–Batavus | 3h 29' 48" |
| 2 | Luis Otaño (ESP) | Fagor | + 20" |
| 3 | José María Errandonea (ESP) | Fagor | + 40" |
| 4 | Domingo Perurena (ESP) | Fagor | s.t. |
| 5 | Jos van der Vleuten (NED) | Televizier–Batavus | s.t. |
| 6 | Carlos Echeverría (ESP) | Kas–Kaskol | s.t. |
| 7 | José Antonio Momeñe (ESP) | Kas–Kaskol | s.t. |
| 8 | Sebastián Elorza (ESP) | Kas–Kaskol | s.t. |
| 9 | Eusebio Vélez (ESP) | Kas–Kaskol | s.t. |
| 10 | Mariano Díaz (ESP) | Fagor | + 1' 15" |

General classification after Stage 13

| Rank | Rider | Team | Time |
|---|---|---|---|
| 1 | Cees Haast (NED) | Televizier–Batavus | 57h 34' 22" |
| 2 | Carlos Echeverría (ESP) | Kas–Kaskol | + 10" |
| 3 | José Antonio Momeñe (ESP) | Kas–Kaskol | + 23" |
| 4 | Eusebio Vélez (ESP) | Kas–Kaskol | + 1' 14" |
| 5 | Francisco Gabica (ESP) | Kas–Kaskol | + 1' 24" |
| 6 | Sebastián Elorza (ESP) | Kas–Kaskol | + 1' 26" |
| 7 | Angelino Soler (ESP) | Ferrys | + 1' 56" |
| 8 | Valentín Uriona (ESP) | Kas–Kaskol | + 2' 07" |
| 9 | Antonio Gómez del Moral (ESP) | Kas–Kaskol | + 2' 14" |
| 10 | Bas Maliepaard (NED) | Televizier–Batavus | + 3' 02" |

== Stage 14 ==
11 May 1966 - San Sebastián to Vitoria, 178 km (111 mi)

Route:

Stage 14 result

| Rank | Rider | Team | Time |
|---|---|---|---|
| 1 | Gregorio San Miguel (ESP) | Kas–Kaskol | 5h 07' 50" |
| 2 | Domingo Perurena (ESP) | Fagor | + 34" |
| 3 | Gerben Karstens (NED) | Televizier–Batavus | + 54" |
| 4 | Juan María Uribezubia (ESP) | Kas–Kaskol | s.t. |
| 5 | Jos van der Vleuten (NED) | Televizier–Batavus | s.t. |
| 6 | José Antonio Momeñe (ESP) | Kas–Kaskol | s.t. |
| 7 | Jaime Fullana Rossello (ESP) | Olimpia | s.t. |
| 8 | Eusebio Vélez (ESP) | Kas–Kaskol | s.t. |
| 9 | Cees Haast (NED) | Televizier–Batavus | s.t. |
| 10 | Mariano Díaz (ESP) | Fagor | s.t. |

General classification after Stage 14

| Rank | Rider | Team | Time |
|---|---|---|---|
| 1 | Cees Haast (NED) | Televizier–Batavus | 62h 43' 06" |
| 2 | Carlos Echeverría (ESP) | Kas–Kaskol | + 10" |
| 3 | José Antonio Momeñe (ESP) | Kas–Kaskol | + 23" |
| 4 | Eusebio Vélez (ESP) | Kas–Kaskol | + 1' 14" |
| 5 | Francisco Gabica (ESP) | Kas–Kaskol | + 1' 24" |
| 6 | Sebastián Elorza (ESP) | Kas–Kaskol | + 1' 26" |
| 7 | Angelino Soler (ESP) | Ferrys | + 1' 56" |
| 8 | Valentín Uriona (ESP) | Kas–Kaskol | + 2' 07" |
| 9 | Antonio Gómez del Moral (ESP) | Kas–Kaskol | + 2' 14" |
| 10 | Gregorio San Miguel (ESP) | Kas–Kaskol | + 2' 33" |

== Stage 15a ==
12 May 1966 - Vitoria to Haro, 61 km (38 mi) (ITT)

Route:

Stage 15a result

| Rank | Rider | Team | Time |
|---|---|---|---|
| 1 | Francisco Gabica (ESP) | Kas–Kaskol | 1h 35' 08" |
| 2 | Luis Otaño (ESP) | Fagor | + 38" |
| 3 | Eusebio Vélez (ESP) | Kas–Kaskol | + 59" |
| 4 | Carlos Echeverría (ESP) | Kas–Kaskol | + 1' 58" |
| 5 | Valentín Uriona (ESP) | Kas–Kaskol | + 2' 01" |
| 6 | José María Errandonea (ESP) | Fagor | + 2' 55" |
| 7 | Antonio Gómez del Moral (ESP) | Kas–Kaskol | + 3' 02" |
| 8 | José Antonio Momeñe (ESP) | Kas–Kaskol | + 3' 26" |
| 9 | Juan María Uribezubia (ESP) | Kas–Kaskol | + 3' 52" |
| 10 | Angelino Soler (ESP) | Ferrys | 4' 05" |

== Stage 15b ==
12 May 1966 - Haro to Logroño, 52 km (32 mi)

Route:

Stage 15b result

| Rank | Rider | Team | Time |
|---|---|---|---|
| 1 | Gerben Karstens (NED) | Televizier–Batavus | 1h 14' 03" |
| 2 | Enzo Pretolani (ITA) | Italy | + 13" |
| 3 | Danilo Ferrari (ITA) | Italy | + 23" |
| 4 | Mario Zanin (ITA) | Italy | s.t. |
| 5 | Ramón Sáez Marzo (ESP) | Ferrys | s.t. |
| 6 | Juan María Uribezubia (ESP) | Kas–Kaskol | s.t. |
| 7 | Henk Nijdam (NED) | Televizier–Batavus | s.t. |
| 8 | Pasquale Fabbri (ITA) | Italy | s.t. |
| 9 | Jos van der Vleuten (NED) | Televizier–Batavus | s.t. |
| 10 | Hubert Criel (BEL) | Wiel's–Gancia-Groene Leeuw | s.t. |

General classification after Stage 15b

| Rank | Rider | Team | Time |
|---|---|---|---|
| 1 | Francisco Gabica (ESP) | Kas–Kaskol | 65h 34' 01" |
| 2 | Eusebio Vélez (ESP) | Kas–Kaskol | + 41" |
| 3 | Carlos Echeverría (ESP) | Kas–Kaskol | + 44" |
| 4 | Luis Otaño (ESP) | Fagor | + 2' 17" |
| 5 | José Antonio Momeñe (ESP) | Kas–Kaskol | + 2' 25" |
| 6 | Valentín Uriona (ESP) | Kas–Kaskol | + 2' 44" |
| 7 | Antonio Gómez del Moral (ESP) | Kas–Kaskol | + 3' 52" |
| 8 | Cees Haast (NED) | Televizier–Batavus | + 3' 54" |
| 9 | Angelino Soler (ESP) | Ferrys | + 4' 37" |
| 10 | José María Errandonea (ESP) | Fagor | + 4' 40" |

== Stage 16 ==
13 May 1966 - Logroño to Burgos, 116 km (72 mi)

Route:

Stage 16 result

| Rank | Rider | Team | Time |
|---|---|---|---|
| 1 | Henk Nijdam (NED) | Televizier–Batavus | 3h 02' 00" |
| 2 | Domingo Perurena (ESP) | Fagor | + 21" |
| 3 | Hubert Criel (BEL) | Wiel's–Gancia-Groene Leeuw | + 41" |
| 4 | Pasquale Fabbri (ITA) | Italy | s.t. |
| 5 | Ramón Sáez Marzo (ESP) | Ferrys | s.t. |
| 6 | Gerben Karstens (NED) | Televizier–Batavus | s.t. |
| 7 | Jos van der Vleuten (NED) | Televizier–Batavus | s.t. |
| 8 | Danilo Ferrari (ITA) | Italy | s.t. |
| 9 | Mario Zanin (ITA) | Italy | s.t. |
| 10 | Clément Roman (BEL) | Wiel's–Gancia-Groene Leeuw | s.t. |

General classification after Stage 16

| Rank | Rider | Team | Time |
|---|---|---|---|
| 1 | Francisco Gabica (ESP) | Kas–Kaskol | 68h 36' 42" |
| 2 | Eusebio Vélez (ESP) | Kas–Kaskol | + 41" |
| 3 | Carlos Echeverría (ESP) | Kas–Kaskol | + 44" |
| 4 | Luis Otaño (ESP) | Fagor | + 2' 17" |
| 5 | José Antonio Momeñe (ESP) | Kas–Kaskol | + 2' 25" |
| 6 | Valentín Uriona (ESP) | Kas–Kaskol | + 2' 44" |
| 7 | Antonio Gómez del Moral (ESP) | Kas–Kaskol | + 3' 52" |
| 8 | Cees Haast (NED) | Televizier–Batavus | + 3' 55" |
| 9 | Angelino Soler (ESP) | Ferrys | + 4' 37" |
| 10 | José María Errandonea (ESP) | Fagor | + 4' 40" |

== Stage 17 ==
14 May 1966 - Burgos to Santander, 226 km (140 mi)

Route:

Stage 17 result

| Rank | Rider | Team | Time |
|---|---|---|---|
| 1 | Gerben Karstens (NED) | Televizier–Batavus | 6h 22' 55" |
| 2 | Danilo Ferrari (ITA) | Italy | + 20" |
| 3 | Ramón Sáez Marzo (ESP) | Ferrys | + 40" |
| 4 | Livio Trapè (ITA) | Italy | s.t. |
| 5 | Hubert Criel (BEL) | Wiel's–Gancia-Groene Leeuw | s.t. |
| 6 | Antonio Bertrán Panadés (ESP) | Ferrys | s.t. |
| 7 | Artemio Vanughi (ITA) | Wiel's–Gancia-Groene Leeuw | s.t. |
| 8 | Domingo Perurena (ESP) | Fagor | s.t. |
| 9 | Pasquale Fabbri (ITA) | Italy | s.t. |
| 10 | Jaime Fullana Rossello (ESP) | Olimpia | s.t. |

General classification after Stage 17

| Rank | Rider | Team | Time |
|---|---|---|---|
| 1 | Francisco Gabica (ESP) | Kas–Kaskol | 75h 00' 17" |
| 2 | Eusebio Vélez (ESP) | Kas–Kaskol | + 41" |
| 3 | Carlos Echeverría (ESP) | Kas–Kaskol | + 44" |
| 4 | Luis Otaño (ESP) | Fagor | + 2' 17" |
| 5 | José Antonio Momeñe (ESP) | Kas–Kaskol | + 2' 25" |
| 6 | Valentín Uriona (ESP) | Kas–Kaskol | + 2' 44" |
| 7 | Antonio Gómez del Moral (ESP) | Kas–Kaskol | + 3' 52" |
| 8 | Cees Haast (NED) | Televizier–Batavus | + 3' 55" |
| 9 | Angelino Soler (ESP) | Ferrys | + 4' 37" |
| 10 | José María Errandonea (ESP) | Fagor | + 4' 40" |

== Stage 18 ==
15 May 1966 - Santander to Bilbao, 154 km (96 mi)

Route:

Stage 18 result

| Rank | Rider | Team | Time |
|---|---|---|---|
| 1 | Domingo Perurena (ESP) | Fagor | 3h 52' 47" |
| 2 | Gregorio San Miguel (ESP) | Kas–Kaskol | + 24" |
| 3 | Eduardo Castelló (ESP) | Ferrys | s.t. |
| 4 | Gerben Karstens (NED) | Televizier–Batavus | + 51" |
| 5 | José María Errandonea (ESP) | Fagor | s.t. |
| 6 | Jos van der Vleuten (NED) | Televizier–Batavus | s.t. |
| 7 | Luis Otaño (ESP) | Fagor | s.t. |
| 8 | José Antonio Momeñe (ESP) | Kas–Kaskol | s.t. |
| 9 | Danilo Ferrari (ITA) | Italy | s.t. |
| 10 | Jaime Fullana Rossello (ESP) | Olimpia | s.t. |

General classification after Stage 18

| Rank | Rider | Team | Time |
|---|---|---|---|
| 1 | Francisco Gabica (ESP) | Kas–Kaskol | 78h 53' 55" |
| 2 | Eusebio Vélez (ESP) | Kas–Kaskol | + 41" |
| 3 | Carlos Echeverría (ESP) | Kas–Kaskol | + 44" |
| 4 | Luis Otaño (ESP) | Fagor | + 2' 17" |
| 5 | José Antonio Momeñe (ESP) | Kas–Kaskol | + 2' 25" |
| 6 | Valentín Uriona (ESP) | Kas–Kaskol | + 2' 44" |
| 7 | Antonio Gómez del Moral (ESP) | Kas–Kaskol | + 3' 52" |
| 8 | Cees Haast (NED) | Televizier–Batavus | + 3' 55" |
| 9 | Angelino Soler (ESP) | Ferrys | + 4' 37" |
| 10 | José María Errandonea (ESP) | Fagor | + 4' 40" |
