= 1966 Vuelta a España, Stage 1a to Stage 9 =

Long-distance bicycle race stages

The 1966 Vuelta a España was the 21st edition of the Vuelta a España, one of cycling's Grand Tours. The Vuelta began in Murcia on 28 April, and Stage 9 occurred on 6 May with a stage to Las Colinas. The race finished in Bilbao on 15 May.

== Stage 1a ==
28 April 1966 - Murcia to Murcia, 111 km (69.0 mi)

Route:

Stage 1a result and general classification after Stage 1a

Rank	Rider	Team	Time
1	Bruno Sivilotti (ITA)	Libertas	2h 37' 37"
2	Bas Maliepaard (NED)	Televizier–Batavus	+ 10"
3	Pasquale Fabbri (ITA)	Italy	+ 20"
4	Jo de Roo (NED)	Televizier–Batavus	s.t.
5	Gerben Karstens (NED)	Televizier–Batavus	s.t.
6	Roger de Wilde (BEL)	Libertas	s.t.
7	Rik Wouters (NED)	Televizier–Batavus	s.t.
8	Henk Nijdam (NED)	Televizier–Batavus	s.t.
9	Cees Haast (NED)	Televizier–Batavus	s.t.
10	Leo van Dongen (NED)	Televizier–Batavus	s.t.

== Stage 1b ==
28 April 1966 - Murcia to Murcia, 3.5 km (2.2 mi) (ITT)

Stage 1b result

Rank	Rider	Team	Time
1	José María Errandonea (ESP)	Fagor	4' 17"
2	Jos van der Vleuten (NED)	Televizier–Batavus	+ 24"
3	Francisco Gabica (ESP)	Kas–Kaskol	s.t.
4	Antonio Gómez del Moral (ESP)	Kas–Kaskol	s.t.
5	Jo de Roo (NED)	Televizier–Batavus	+ 28"
6	José Antonio Momeñe (ESP)	Kas–Kaskol	+ 29"
7	Eusebio Vélez (ESP)	Kas–Kaskol	s.t.
8	José Manuel López (ESP)	Fagor	s.t.
9	Gerben Karstens (NED)	Televizier–Batavus	+ 30"
10	Bas Maliepaard (NED)	Televizier–Batavus	s.t.

General classification after Stage 1b

Rank	Rider	Team	Time
1	José María Errandonea (ESP)	Fagor	2h 42' 14"
2	Bas Maliepaard (NED)	Televizier–Batavus	+ 20"
3	Jos van der Vleuten (NED)	Televizier–Batavus	+ 24"
4	Francisco Gabica (ESP)	Kas–Kaskol	s.t.
5	Antonio Gómez del Moral (ESP)	Kas–Kaskol	s.t.
6	Bruno Sivilotti (ITA)	Libertas	s.t.
7	Jo de Roo (NED)	Televizier–Batavus	+ 28"
8	José Antonio Momeñe (ESP)	Kas–Kaskol	+ 30"
9	Eusebio Vélez (ESP)	Kas–Kaskol	s.t.
10	José Manuel López (ESP)	Fagor	s.t.

== Stages 2a and 2b ==
29 April 1966 - Murcia to La Manga, 81 km (50.3 mi); La Manga to Benidorm, 153 km (95 mi)

Route:

Stages 2a and 2b combined result

Rank	Rider	Team	Time
1	Ramón Mendiburu (ESP)	Fagor	5h 55' 25"
2	Enzo Pretolani (ITA)	Italy	+ 5"
3	Jos van der Vleuten (NED)	Televizier–Batavus	s.t.
4	Roger de Wilde (BEL)	Libertas	+ 15"
5	Jo de Roo (NED)	Televizier–Batavus	+ 25"
6	Pasquale Fabbri (ITA)	Italy	s.t.
7	Henk Nijdam (NED)	Televizier–Batavus	s.t.
8	Mario Zanin (ITA)	Italy	s.t.
9	Hubert Criel (BEL)	Wiel's–Gancia-Groene Leeuw	s.t.
10	Ramón Sáez Marzo (ESP)	Ferrys	s.t.

General classification after Stage 2b

Rank	Rider	Team	Time
1	José María Errandonea (ESP)	Fagor	8h 38' 04"
2	Jos van der Vleuten (NED)	Televizier–Batavus	+ 9"
3	Ramón Mendiburu (ESP)	Fagor	+ 18"
4	Bas Maliepaard (NED)	Televizier–Batavus	+ 20"
5	Francisco Gabica (ESP)	Kas–Kaskol	+ 24"
6	Antonio Gómez del Moral (ESP)	Kas–Kaskol	s.t.
7	Bruno Sivilotti (ITA)	Libertas	s.t.
8	Jo de Roo (NED)	Televizier–Batavus	+ 28"
9	José Manuel López (ESP)	Fagor	+ 29"
10	José Antonio Momeñe (ESP)	Kas–Kaskol	s.t.

== Stage 3 ==
30 April 1966 - Benidorm to Valencia, 148 km (92 mi)

Route:

Stage 3 result

Rank	Rider	Team	Time
1	José Antonio Momeñe (ESP)	Kas–Kaskol	3h 39' 25"
2	Jos van der Vleuten (NED)	Televizier–Batavus	+ 22"
3	Jo de Roo (NED)	Televizier–Batavus	+ 45"
4	Bruno Sivilotti (ITA)	Libertas	s.t.
5	Pasquale Fabbri (ITA)	Italy	s.t.
6	Rik Wouters (NED)	Televizier–Batavus	s.t.
7	Leo van Dongen (NED)	Televizier–Batavus	s.t.
8	Gerben Karstens (NED)	Televizier–Batavus	s.t.
9	Henk Nijdam (NED)	Televizier–Batavus	s.t.
10	José Pérez Francés (ESP)	Ferrys	s.t.

General classification after Stage 3

Rank	Rider	Team	Time
1	José Antonio Momeñe (ESP)	Kas–Kaskol	12h 17' 58"
2	Jos van der Vleuten (NED)	Televizier–Batavus	+ 2"
3	José María Errandonea (ESP)	Fagor	+ 16"
4	Ramón Mendiburu (ESP)	Fagor	+ 34"
5	Bas Maliepaard (NED)	Televizier–Batavus	+ 36"
6	Bruno Sivilotti (ITA)	Libertas	+ 40"
7	Francisco Gabica (ESP)	Kas–Kaskol	+ 44"
8	Antonio Gómez del Moral (ESP)	Kas–Kaskol	s.t.
9	Jo de Roo (NED)	Televizier–Batavus	s.t.
10	José Manuel López (ESP)	Fagor	+ 45"

== Stage 4 ==
1 May 1966 - Cuenca to Madrid, 177 km (110 mi)

Route:

Stage 4 result

Rank	Rider	Team	Time
1	Valentín Uriona (ESP)	Kas–Kaskol	4h 27' 21"
2	Jesús Manzaneque (ESP)	Olimpia	+ 25"
3	Esteban Martín Jiménez (ESP)	Fagor	+ 45"
4	Jaime Fullana Rossello (ESP)	Olimpia	+ 1' 00"
5	Henk Nijdam (NED)	Televizier–Batavus	s.t.
6	Gerben Karstens (NED)	Televizier–Batavus	s.t.
7	Jo de Roo (NED)	Televizier–Batavus	s.t.
8	Oreste Magni (ITA)	Italy	s.t.
9	Jos van der Vleuten (NED)	Televizier–Batavus	s.t.
10	Leo van Dongen (NED)	Televizier–Batavus	s.t.

General classification after Stage 4

Rank	Rider	Team	Time
1	Valentín Uriona (ESP)	Kas–Kaskol	16h 46' 06"
2	José Antonio Momeñe (ESP)	Kas–Kaskol	+ 13"
3	Jos van der Vleuten (NED)	Televizier–Batavus	+ 15"
4	José María Errandonea (ESP)	Fagor	+ 29"
5	Ramón Mendiburu (ESP)	Fagor	+ 47"
6	Bas Maliepaard (NED)	Televizier–Batavus	+ 49"
7	Antonio Gómez del Moral (ESP)	Kas–Kaskol	+ 53"
8	Bruno Sivilotti (ITA)	Libertas	s.t.
9	Francisco Gabica (ESP)	Kas–Kaskol	s.t.
10	Esteban Martín Jiménez (ESP)	Fagor	+ 55"

== Stage 5 ==
2 May 1966 - Madrid to Madrid, 181 km (112 mi)

Route:

Stage 5 result

Rank	Rider	Team	Time
1	Carlos Echeverría (ESP)	Kas–Kaskol	4h 52' 03"
2	Jaime Fullana Rossello (ESP)	Olimpia	+ 21"
3	Jaime Alomar (ESP)	Fagor	+ 41"
4	Gregorio San Miguel (ESP)	Kas–Kaskol	s.t.
5	Valentín Uriona (ESP)	Kas–Kaskol	s.t.
6	Alberto Carvalho (POR)	Oporto	s.t.
7	Antonio Gómez del Moral (ESP)	Kas–Kaskol	s.t.
8	José Manuel López (ESP)	Fagor	s.t.
9	Domingo Perurena (ESP)	Fagor	s.t.
10	Jos van der Vleuten (NED)	Televizier–Batavus	s.t.

General classification after Stage 5

Rank	Rider	Team	Time
1	Valentín Uriona (ESP)	Kas–Kaskol	21h 38' 50"
2	José Antonio Momeñe (ESP)	Kas–Kaskol	+ 13"
3	Jos van der Vleuten (NED)	Televizier–Batavus	+ 15"
4	Carlos Echeverría (ESP)	Kas–Kaskol	+ 24"
5	José María Errandonea (ESP)	Fagor	+ 29"
6	Bas Maliepaard (NED)	Televizier–Batavus	+ 49"
7	Antonio Gómez del Moral (ESP)	Kas–Kaskol	+ 53"
8	Francisco Gabica (ESP)	Kas–Kaskol	s.t.
9	Esteban Martín Jiménez (ESP)	Fagor	+ 55"
10	Jo de Roo (NED)	Televizier–Batavus	s.t.

== Stage 6 ==
3 May 1966 - Madrid to Calatayud, 225 km (140 mi)

Stage 6 result

Rank	Rider	Team	Time
1	Jo de Roo (NED)	Televizier–Batavus	6h 02' 44"
2	Gerben Karstens (NED)	Televizier–Batavus	+ 20"
3	Bruno Sivilotti (ITA)	Libertas	+ 40"
4	José Manuel López (ESP)	Fagor	s.t.
5	Jaime Alomar (ESP)	Fagor	s.t.
6	Oreste Magni (ITA)	Italy	s.t.
7	Renato Bongioni (ITA)	Italy	s.t.
8	Danilo Ferrari (ITA)	Italy	s.t.
9	Ignacio Morata Teruel (ESP)	Olimpia	s.t.
10	Rik Wouters (NED)	Televizier–Batavus	s.t.

General classification after Stage 6

Rank	Rider	Team	Time
1	Valentín Uriona (ESP)	Kas–Kaskol	27h 42' 14"
2	José Antonio Momeñe (ESP)	Kas–Kaskol	+ 13"
3	Jos van der Vleuten (NED)	Televizier–Batavus	+ 15"
4	Jo de Roo (NED)	Televizier–Batavus	+ 17"
5	Carlos Echeverría (ESP)	Kas–Kaskol	+ 24"
6	José María Errandonea (ESP)	Fagor	+ 29"
7	Bas Maliepaard (NED)	Televizier–Batavus	+ 49"
8	Antonio Gómez del Moral (ESP)	Kas–Kaskol	+ 53"
9	Francisco Gabica (ESP)	Kas–Kaskol	s.t.
10	Esteban Martín Jiménez (ESP)	Fagor	+ 55"

== Stage 7 ==
4 May 1966 - Calatayud to Zaragoza, 105 km (65 mi)

Route:

Stage 7 result

Rank	Rider	Team	Time
1	Cees Haast (NED)	Televizier–Batavus	2h 09' 03"
2	Francisco Gabica (ESP)	Kas–Kaskol	+ 20"
3	Romain Robben (BEL)	Libertas	+ 40"
4	Bas Maliepaard (NED)	Televizier–Batavus	s.t.
5	José Antonio Momeñe (ESP)	Kas–Kaskol	s.t.
6	Antonio Gómez del Moral (ESP)	Kas–Kaskol	s.t.
7	Gregorio San Miguel (ESP)	Kas–Kaskol	s.t.
8	Carlos Echeverría (ESP)	Kas–Kaskol	s.t.
9	Eusebio Vélez (ESP)	Kas–Kaskol	s.t.
10	Angelino Soler (ESP)	Ferrys	s.t.

General classification after Stage 7

Rank	Rider	Team	Time
1	Valentín Uriona (ESP)	Kas–Kaskol	29h 51' 57"
2	José Antonio Momeñe (ESP)	Kas–Kaskol	+ 13"
3	Carlos Echeverría (ESP)	Kas–Kaskol	+ 24"
4	Cees Haast (NED)	Televizier–Batavus	+ 30"
5	Francisco Gabica (ESP)	Kas–Kaskol	+ 33"
6	Bas Maliepaard (NED)	Televizier–Batavus	+ 49"
7	Antonio Gómez del Moral (ESP)	Kas–Kaskol	+ 53"
8	Eusebio Vélez (ESP)	Kas–Kaskol	+ 58"
9	Romain Robben (BEL)	Libertas	+ 59"
10	Gregorio San Miguel (ESP)	Kas–Kaskol	+ 1' 03"

== Stage 8 ==
5 May 1966 - Zaragoza to Lleida, 144 km (89 mi)

Route:

Stage 8 result

Rank	Rider	Team	Time
1	Henk Nijdam (NED)	Televizier–Batavus	3h 19' 06"
2	Aldo Moser (ITA)	Italy	+ 20"
3	Pasquale Fabbri (ITA)	Italy	+ 3' 15"
4	Danilo Ferrari (ITA)	Italy	s.t.
5	Bas Maliepaard (NED)	Televizier–Batavus	s.t.
6	Gerben Karstens (NED)	Televizier–Batavus	s.t.
7	Jo de Roo (NED)	Televizier–Batavus	s.t.
8	Hubert Criel (BEL)	Wiel's–Gancia-Groene Leeuw	s.t.
9	Enzo Pretolani (ITA)	Italy	s.t.
10	Mario Zanin (ITA)	Italy	s.t.

General classification after Stage 8

Rank	Rider	Team	Time
1	Valentín Uriona (ESP)	Kas–Kaskol	33h 14' 18"
2	José Antonio Momeñe (ESP)	Kas–Kaskol	+ 13"
3	Carlos Echeverría (ESP)	Kas–Kaskol	+ 24"
4	Cees Haast (NED)	Televizier–Batavus	+ 30"
5	Francisco Gabica (ESP)	Kas–Kaskol	+ 33"
6	Bas Maliepaard (NED)	Televizier–Batavus	+ 49"
7	Antonio Gómez del Moral (ESP)	Kas–Kaskol	+ 53"
8	Eusebio Vélez (ESP)	Kas–Kaskol	+ 58"
9	Gregorio San Miguel (ESP)	Kas–Kaskol	+ 1' 03"
10	Angelino Soler (ESP)	Ferrys	+ 1' 05"

== Stage 9 ==
6 May 1966 - Lleida to Las Colinas, 128 km (80 mi)

Route:

Stage 9 result

Rank	Rider	Team	Time
1	Antonio Gómez del Moral (ESP)	Kas–Kaskol	3h 13' 32"
2	Carlos Echeverría (ESP)	Kas–Kaskol	+ 22"
3	Jaime Alomar (ESP)	Fagor	+ 42"
4	Domingo Perurena (ESP)	Fagor	+ 44"
5	Jos van der Vleuten (NED)	Televizier–Batavus	+ 46"
6	Angelino Soler (ESP)	Ferrys	s.t.
7	Pasquale Fabbri (ITA)	Italy	s.t.
8	Cees Haast (NED)	Televizier–Batavus	s.t.
9	José Antonio Momeñe (ESP)	Kas–Kaskol	s.t.
10	Valentín Uriona (ESP)	Kas–Kaskol	s.t.

General classification after Stage 9

Rank	Rider	Team	Time
1	Valentín Uriona (ESP)	Kas–Kaskol	36h 28' 36"
2	Carlos Echeverría (ESP)	Kas–Kaskol	s.t.
3	Antonio Gómez del Moral (ESP)	Kas–Kaskol	+ 7"
4	José Antonio Momeñe (ESP)	Kas–Kaskol	+ 13"
5	Cees Haast (NED)	Televizier–Batavus	+ 30"
6	Francisco Gabica (ESP)	Kas–Kaskol	+ 33"
7	Bas Maliepaard (NED)	Televizier–Batavus	+ 55"
8	Eusebio Vélez (ESP)	Kas–Kaskol	+ 1' 04"
9	Angelino Soler (ESP)	Ferrys	+ 1' 05"
10	Gregorio San Miguel (ESP)	Kas–Kaskol	+ 1' 09"
