= 1967 Vuelta a España, Stage 10a to Stage 18 =

Cycling race stages

The 1967 Vuelta a España was the 22nd edition of the Vuelta a España, one of cycling's Grand Tours. The Vuelta began in Vigo on 27 April, and Stage 10a occurred on 6 May with a stage from Sitges. The race finished in Bilbao on 14 May.

== Stage 10a ==
6 May 1967 - Sitges to Barcelona, 39 km (24.2 mi)

Route:

Stage 10a result

Rank	Rider	Team	Time
1	Jan Harings (NED)	Televizier–Batavus	55' 48"
2	Rolf Wolfshohl (FRG)	Bic–Hutchinson	s.t.
3	José María Errandonea (ESP)	Fagor	+ 35"
4	Gerben Karstens (NED)	Televizier–Batavus	s.t.
5	Domingo Perurena (ESP)	Fagor	s.t.
6	Theo Mertens (BEL)	Peugeot–BP–Michelin	s.t.
7	Raymond Riotte (FRA)	Bic–Hutchinson	s.t.
8	Jan Janssen (NED)	Pelforth–Sauvage–Lejeune	s.t.
9	Serge Bolley (FRA)	Bic–Hutchinson	s.t.
10	Jozef Spruyt (BEL)	Mercier–BP–Hutchinson	s.t.

== Stage 10b ==
6 May 1967 - Barcelona to Barcelona, 45.4 km (28.2 mi)

Route:

Stage 10b result

Rank	Rider	Team	Time
1	Gerben Karstens (NED)	Televizier–Batavus	1h 04' 18"
2	Ramón Sáez Marzo (ESP)	Ferrys	+ 10"
3	Jan Janssen (NED)	Pelforth–Sauvage–Lejeune	+ 20"
4	Bernard Van de Kerckhove (BEL)	Pelforth–Sauvage–Lejeune	s.t.
5	José María Errandonea (ESP)	Fagor	s.t.
6	Jozef Spruyt (BEL)	Mercier–BP–Hutchinson	s.t.
7	Evert Dolman (NED)	Televizier–Batavus	s.t.
8	Michel Jacquemin (BEL)	Roméo–Smith's	s.t.
9	Henk Nijdam (NED)	Televizier–Batavus	s.t.
10	Jan Harings (NED)	Televizier–Batavus	s.t.

General classification after Stage 10b

Rank	Rider	Team	Time
1	Jean-Pierre Ducasse (FRA)	Pelforth–Sauvage–Lejeune	43h 52' 17"
2	Luis Otaño (ESP)	Fagor	+ 5' 16"
3	Cees Haast (NED)	Televizier–Batavus	+ 5' 34"
4	Gregorio San Miguel (ESP)	Kas–Kaskol	+ 5' 57"
5	Aurelio González Puente (ESP)	Kas–Kaskol	+ 6' 06"
6	Jan Janssen (NED)	Pelforth–Sauvage–Lejeune	+ 7' 23"
7	José Manuel López (ESP)	Fagor	+ 7' 38"
8	Arie den Hartog (NED)	Bic–Hutchinson	+ 7' 44"
9	Ramón Mendiburu Ibarburu (ESP)	Fagor	+ 8' 23"
10	Angelino Soler (ESP)	Karpy	+ 8' 25"

== Stage 11 ==
7 May 1967 - Barcelona to Andorra la Vella, 241 km (149.8 mi)

Route:

Stage 11 result

Rank	Rider	Team	Time
1	Mariano Díaz (ESP)	Fagor	6h 39' 21"
2	Carlos Echeverria (ESP)	Kas–Kaskol	+ 1' 51"
3	Julio Jiménez (ESP)	Bic–Hutchinson	+ 2' 11"
4	Vicente López Carril (ESP)	Kas–Kaskol	s.t.
5	Francisco José Juan Granell (ESP)	Karpy	s.t.
6	José Manuel López (ESP)	Fagor	s.t.
7	Jan Janssen (NED)	Pelforth–Sauvage–Lejeune	+ 2' 42"
8	André Zimmermann (FRA)	Peugeot–BP–Michelin	s.t.
9	Raymond Poulidor (FRA)	Mercier–BP–Hutchinson	s.t.
10	Silvano Schiavon (ITA)	Vittadello	s.t.

General classification after Stage 11

Rank	Rider	Team	Time
1	Jean-Pierre Ducasse (FRA)	Pelforth–Sauvage–Lejeune	50h 34' 20"
2	Gregorio San Miguel (ESP)	Kas–Kaskol	+ 5' 57"
3	Aurelio González Puente (ESP)	Kas–Kaskol	+ 6' 06"
4	José Manuel López (ESP)	Fagor	+ 7' 03"
5	Jan Janssen (NED)	Pelforth–Sauvage–Lejeune	+ 7' 07"
6	Cees Haast (NED)	Televizier–Batavus	+ 8' 01"
7	Luis Otaño (ESP)	Fagor	+ 8' 55"
8	Arie den Hartog (NED)	Bic–Hutchinson	+ 9' 00"
9	José Antonio Pontón Ruiz (ESP)	Ferrys	+ 10' 23"
10	Angelino Soler (ESP)	Karpy	+ 10' 52"

== Stage 12 ==
8 May 1967 - Andorra la Vella to Lleida, 158 km (98.2 mi)

Route:

Stage 12 result

Rank	Rider	Team	Time
1	Henk Nijdam (NED)	Televizier–Batavus	3h 41' 09"
2	Jean Graczyk (FRA)	Bic–Hutchinson	+ 20"
3	Hubert Ferrer (FRA)	Mercier–BP–Hutchinson	+ 40"
4	Bas Maliepaard (NED)	Roméo–Smith's	s.t.
5	Fernando Manzaneque (ESP)	Ferrys	s.t.
6	Rolf Wolfshohl (FRG)	Bic–Hutchinson	s.t.
7	José Suria Cutrina (ESP)	Ferrys	s.t.
8	Marino Vigna (ITA)	Vittadello	s.t.
9	Désiré Letort (FRA)	Peugeot–BP–Michelin	s.t.
10	Gerben Karstens (NED)	Televizier–Batavus	+ 7' 34"

== Stage 13 ==
9 May 1967 - Lleida to Zaragoza, 182 km (113 mi)

Route:

Stage 13 result

Rank	Rider	Team	Time
1	Ángel Ibáñez (ESP)	Ferrys	4h 39' 46"
2	Domingo Perurena (ESP)	Fagor	+ 2' 51"
3	José Pérez Francés (ESP)	Kas–Kaskol	+ 3' 11"
4	Carlos Echeverria (ESP)	Kas–Kaskol	s.t.
5	José Antonio Momeñe (ESP)	Fagor	s.t.
6	Bernard Van de Kerckhove (BEL)	Pelforth–Sauvage–Lejeune	s.t.
7	Francisco José Juan Granell (ESP)	Karpy	s.t.
8	Roland Van De Rijse (BEL)	Roméo–Smith's	s.t.
9	Guido De Rosso (ITA)	Vittadello	s.t.
10	Bas Maliepaard (NED)	Roméo–Smith's	s.t.

General classification after Stage 13

Rank	Rider	Team	Time
1	Jean-Pierre Ducasse (FRA)	Pelforth–Sauvage–Lejeune	59h 06' 37"
2	Gregorio San Miguel (ESP)	Kas–Kaskol	+ 5' 57"
3	Aurelio González Puente (ESP)	Kas–Kaskol	+ 6' 06"
4	José Manuel López (ESP)	Fagor	+ 7' 07"
5	Jan Janssen (NED)	Pelforth–Sauvage–Lejeune	+ 7' 23"
6	Cees Haast (NED)	Televizier–Batavus	+ 8' 01"
7	Arie den Hartog (NED)	Bic–Hutchinson	+ 8' 28"
8	Luis Otaño (ESP)	Fagor	+ 8' 55"
9	José Antonio Pontón Ruiz (ESP)	Ferrys	+ 10' 39"
10	Angelino Soler (ESP)	Karpy	+ 10' 52"

== Stage 14 ==
10 May 1967 - Zaragoza to Pamplona, 193 km (120 mi)

Route:

Stage 14 result

Rank	Rider	Team	Time
1	Jos van der Vleuten (NED)	Televizier–Batavus	4h 24' 39"
2	Theo Mertens (BEL)	Peugeot–BP–Michelin	+ 9' 03"
3	Cees Snepvangers (NED)	Televizier–Batavus	+ 9' 26"
4	Domingo Perurena (ESP)	Fagor	+ 9' 39"
5	José María Errandonea (ESP)	Fagor	+ 9' 41"
6	Huub Zilverberg (NED)	Televizier–Batavus	+ 9' 42"
7	Jan Janssen (NED)	Pelforth–Sauvage–Lejeune	s.t.
8	Ramón Sáez Marzo (ESP)	Ferrys	s.t.
9	Jan Harings (NED)	Televizier–Batavus	s.t.
10	José Antonio Momeñe (ESP)	Fagor	s.t.

General classification after Stage 14

Rank	Rider	Team	Time
1	Jean-Pierre Ducasse (FRA)	Pelforth–Sauvage–Lejeune	63h 40' 58"
2	Gregorio San Miguel (ESP)	Kas–Kaskol	+ 5' 57"
3	Aurelio González Puente (ESP)	Kas–Kaskol	+ 6' 06"
4	José Manuel López (ESP)	Fagor	+ 7' 07"
5	Jan Janssen (NED)	Pelforth–Sauvage–Lejeune	+ 7' 23"
6	Cees Haast (NED)	Televizier–Batavus	+ 8' 01"
7	Luis Otaño (ESP)	Fagor	+ 8' 55"
8	Arie den Hartog (NED)	Bic–Hutchinson	+ 8' 58"
9	José Antonio Pontón Ruiz (ESP)	Ferrys	+ 10' 39"
10	Angelino Soler (ESP)	Karpy	+ 10' 52"

== Stage 15a ==
11 May 1967 - Pamplona to Logroño, 92 km (57 mi)

Route:

Stage 15a result

Rank	Rider	Team	Time
1	Rolf Wolfshohl (FRG)	Bic–Hutchinson	2h 13' 15"
2	Eduardo Castelló (ESP)	Ferrys	+ 1' 55"
3	Gerben Karstens (NED)	Televizier–Batavus	+ 2' 30"
4	Jan Janssen (NED)	Pelforth–Sauvage–Lejeune	s.t.
5	Domingo Perurena (ESP)	Fagor	s.t.
6	Ramón Sáez Marzo (ESP)	Ferrys	s.t.
7	Jozef Spruyt (BEL)	Mercier–BP–Hutchinson	s.t.
8	Theo Mertens (BEL)	Peugeot–BP–Michelin	s.t.
9	Henk Nijdam (NED)	Televizier–Batavus	s.t.
10	Roland Van De Rijse (BEL)	Roméo–Smith's	s.t.

== Stage 15b ==
11 May 1967 - Laguardia to Vitoria, 44 km (27 mi) (ITT)

Route:

Stage 15b result

Rank	Rider	Team	Time
1	Raymond Poulidor (FRA)	Mercier–BP–Hutchinson	1h 04' 48"
2	Eusebio Vélez (ESP)	Kas–Kaskol	+ 1' 26"
3	José Pérez Francés (ESP)	Kas–Kaskol	+ 2' 57"
4	Carlos Echeverria (ESP)	Kas–Kaskol	+ 3' 17"
5	Francisco Gabica (ESP)	Kas–Kaskol	+ 3' 44"
6	Vicente López Carril (ESP)	Kas–Kaskol	+ 3' 45"
7	Jan Janssen (NED)	Pelforth–Sauvage–Lejeune	+ 3' 50"
8	Salvador Canet García (ESP)	Ferrys	+ 4' 24"
9	José María Errandonea (ESP)	Fagor	+ 4' 34"
10	Antonio Gómez del Moral (ESP)	Kas–Kaskol	+ 4' 40"

General classification after Stage 15b

Rank	Rider	Team	Time
1	Jean-Pierre Ducasse (FRA)	Pelforth–Sauvage–Lejeune	67h 11' 51"
2	Jan Janssen (NED)	Pelforth–Sauvage–Lejeune	+ 53"
3	Aurelio González Puente (ESP)	Kas–Kaskol	+ 1' 23"
4	Gregorio San Miguel (ESP)	Kas–Kaskol	+ 2' 56"
5	Cees Haast (NED)	Televizier–Batavus	+ 3' 01"
6	Luis Otaño (ESP)	Fagor	+ 3' 20"
7	José Manuel López (ESP)	Fagor	+ 4' 20"
8	Mariano Díaz (ESP)	Fagor	+ 5' 23"
9	José Pérez Francés (ESP)	Kas–Kaskol	+ 6' 49"
10	José Antonio Pontón Ruiz (ESP)	Ferrys	+ 6' 51"

== Stage 16 ==
12 May 1967 - Vitoria to San Sebastián, 139 km (86 mi)

Route:

Stage 16 result

Rank	Rider	Team	Time
1	Tom Simpson (GBR)	Peugeot–BP–Michelin	3h 39' 02"
2	Francisco José Juan Granell (ESP)	Karpy	+ 20"
3	Georges Chappe (FRA)	Mercier–BP–Hutchinson	+ 40"
4	Domingo Perurena (ESP)	Fagor	+ 2' 58"
5	José María Errandonea (ESP)	Fagor	s.t.
6	Jan Janssen (NED)	Pelforth–Sauvage–Lejeune	+ 3' 02"
7	Ramón Sáez Marzo (ESP)	Ferrys	s.t.
8	Rolf Wolfshohl (FRG)	Bic–Hutchinson	s.t.
9	Jozef Spruyt (BEL)	Mercier–BP–Hutchinson	s.t.
10	Johny Schleck (LUX)	Pelforth–Sauvage–Lejeune	s.t.

General classification after Stage 16

Rank	Rider	Team	Time
1	Jean-Pierre Ducasse (FRA)	Pelforth–Sauvage–Lejeune	70h 53' 55"
2	Jan Janssen (NED)	Pelforth–Sauvage–Lejeune	+ 53"
3	Aurelio González Puente (ESP)	Kas–Kaskol	+ 1' 43"
4	Gregorio San Miguel (ESP)	Kas–Kaskol	+ 2' 56"
5	Cees Haast (NED)	Televizier–Batavus	+ 3' 01"
6	Luis Otaño (ESP)	Fagor	+ 3' 20"
7	José Manuel López (ESP)	Fagor	+ 4' 20"
8	Mariano Díaz (ESP)	Fagor	+ 5' 23"
9	José Pérez Francés (ESP)	Kas–Kaskol	+ 5' 49"
10	José Antonio Pontón Ruiz (ESP)	Ferrys	+ 5' 51"

== Stage 17 ==
13 May 1967 - Villabona to Zarautz, 28 km (17 mi) (ITT)

Route:

Stage 17 result

Rank	Rider	Team	Time
1	Gerben Karstens (NED)	Televizier–Batavus	40' 58"
2	Valentín Uriona (ESP)	Fagor	+ 27"
3	Gilbert Bellone (FRA)	Mercier–BP–Hutchinson	+ 52"
4	Raymond Poulidor (FRA)	Mercier–BP–Hutchinson	+ 1' 16"
5	Eusebio Vélez (ESP)	Kas–Kaskol	+ 1' 31"
6	Jesús Aranzabal (ESP)	Fagor	+ 1' 53"
7	Henk Nijdam (NED)	Televizier–Batavus	+ 2' 04"
8	Désiré Letort (FRA)	Peugeot–BP–Michelin	+ 2' 05"
9	Serge Bolley (FRA)	Bic–Hutchinson	s.t.
10	Jan Janssen (NED)	Pelforth–Sauvage–Lejeune	+ 2' 15"

General classification after Stage 17

Rank	Rider	Team	Time
1	Jan Janssen (NED)	Pelforth–Sauvage–Lejeune	71h 38' 00"
2	Jean-Pierre Ducasse (FRA)	Pelforth–Sauvage–Lejeune	+ 1' 03"
3	Aurelio González Puente (ESP)	Kas–Kaskol	+ 1' 45"
4	Luis Otaño (ESP)	Fagor	+ 2' 39"
5	Cees Haast (NED)	Televizier–Batavus	+ 3' 20"
6	Gregorio San Miguel (ESP)	Kas–Kaskol	+ 3' 39"
7	José Manuel López (ESP)	Fagor	+ 3' 41"
8	Raymond Poulidor (FRA)	Mercier–BP–Hutchinson	+ 4' 20"
9	Mariano Díaz (ESP)	Fagor	+ 5' 18"
10	José Pérez Francés (ESP)	Kas–Kaskol	+ 6' 00"

== Stage 18 ==
14 May 1967 - Zarautz to Bilbao, 175 km (109 mi)

Route:

Stage 18 result

Rank	Rider	Team	Time
1	Gerben Karstens (NED)	Televizier–Batavus	4h 59' 24"
2	Ramón Sáez Marzo (ESP)	Ferrys	+ 20"
3	Ventura Díaz (ESP)	Ferrys	+ 40"
4	Evert Dolman (NED)	Televizier–Batavus	s.t.
5	José Pérez Francés (ESP)	Kas–Kaskol	s.t.
6	José Manuel López (ESP)	Fagor	s.t.
7	Aurelio González Puente (ESP)	Kas–Kaskol	s.t.
8	Jan Janssen (NED)	Pelforth–Sauvage–Lejeune	s.t.
9	Angelino Soler (ESP)	Karpy	s.t.
10	Rolf Wolfshohl (FRG)	Bic–Hutchinson	s.t.

General classification after Stage 18

Rank	Rider	Team	Time
1	Jan Janssen (NED)	Pelforth–Sauvage–Lejeune	76h 38' 04"
2	Jean-Pierre Ducasse (FRA)	Pelforth–Sauvage–Lejeune	+ 1' 43"
3	Aurelio González Puente (ESP)	Kas–Kaskol	+ 1' 45"
4	Luis Otaño (ESP)	Fagor	+ 2' 39"
5	Cees Haast (NED)	Televizier–Batavus	+ 3' 20"
6	José Manuel López (ESP)	Fagor	+ 3' 41"
7	Gregorio San Miguel (ESP)	Kas–Kaskol	+ 4' 19"
8	Raymond Poulidor (FRA)	Mercier–BP–Hutchinson	+ 4' 20"
9	Mariano Díaz (ESP)	Fagor	+ 5' 56"
10	José Pérez Francés (ESP)	Kas–Kaskol	+ 6' 04"
