= List of teams and cyclists in the 1968 Vuelta a España =

For the 1968 Vuelta a España, the field consisted of 90 riders; 51 finished the race.

== By rider ==
Legend
No.	Starting number worn by the rider during the Vuelta
Pos.	Position in the general classification
Time	Deficit to the winner of the general classification
DNF	Denotes a rider who did not finish

No.	Name	Nationality	Team	Pos.	Time	Ref
1	Jan Janssen	Netherlands	Pelforth-Lejeune	6	+ 5' 43"	
2	Bernard Van de Kerckhove	Belgium	Pelforth-Lejeune	DNF	—	
3	Willy Monty	Belgium	Pelforth-Lejeune	44	+ 1h 08' 29"	
4	Jean-Pierre Ducasse	France	Pelforth-Lejeune	12	+ 12' 42"	
5	Édouard Delberghe	France	Pelforth-Lejeune	47	+ 1h 14' 10"	
6	Fernand Etter	France	Pelforth-Lejeune	42	+ 1h 04' 45"	
7	Johny Schleck	Luxembourg	Pelforth-Lejeune	26	+ 31' 47"	
8	Jean-Claude Lefebvre	France	Pelforth-Lejeune	DNF	—	
9	Jean Vidament	France	Pelforth-Lejeune	DNF	—	
10	René Chtiej	France	Pelforth-Lejeune	DNF	—	
11	Eduardo Castelló	Spain	Ferrys	DNF	—	
12	Ventura Díaz	Spain	Ferrys	15	+ 15' 04"	
13	Juan Daniel Perera Ruiz	Spain	Ferrys	DNF	—	
14	Ramón Sáez Marzo	Spain	Ferrys	32	+ 38' 21"	
15	José Antonio Pontón Ruiz	Spain	Ferrys	DNF	—	
16	Ángel Ibáñez	Spain	Ferrys	DNF	—	
17	Gabino Ereñozaga Lejarreta	Spain	Ferrys	DNF	—	
18	Esteban Martín Jiménez	Spain	Ferrys	DNF	—	
19	Salvador Canet García	Spain	Ferrys	31	+ 36' 42"	
20	Sebastián Fernández Dueñas	Spain	Ferrys	DNF	—	
21	Erik De Vlaeminck	Belgium	Goldor-Gerka	DNF	—	
22	André Planckaert	Belgium	Goldor-Gerka	DNF	—	
23	Paul Konings	Belgium	Goldor-Gerka	DNF	—	
24	Raymond Steegmans	Belgium	Goldor-Gerka	DNF	—	
25	Willy Vekemans	Belgium	Goldor-Gerka	DNF	—	
26	Etienne Sonck	Belgium	Goldor-Gerka	DNF	—	
27	Edouard Ernst	Belgium	Goldor-Gerka	DNF	—	
28	Edouard Weckx	Belgium	Goldor-Gerka	DNF	—	
29	Jan Cools	Belgium	Goldor-Gerka	DNF	—	
30	Gilbert Verlinde	Belgium	Goldor-Gerka	DNF	—	
31	José María Errandonea	Spain	Fagor	4	+ 5' 19"	
32	Francisco Gabica	Spain	Fagor	13	+ 13' 23"	
33	Eusebio Vélez	Spain	Fagor	3	+ 5' 08"	
34	Luis Santamarina	Spain	Fagor	28	+ 33' 55"	
35	José Manuel López	Spain	Fagor	16	+ 17' 16"	
36	Domingo Perurena	Spain	Fagor	24	+ 27' 51"	
37	José Antonio Momeñe	Spain	Fagor	17	+ 17' 23"	
38	Luis Ocaña	Spain	Fagor	DNF	—	
39	Jesús Aranzabal	Spain	Fagor	33	+ 39' 17"	
40	Luis Otaño	Spain	Fagor	11	+ 10' 39"	
41	Lucien Aimar	France	Bic	9	+ 6' 42"	
42	Arie den Hartog	Netherlands	Bic	DNF	—	
43	Cees Haast	Netherlands	Bic	20	+ 20' 09"	
44	Siegfried Adler	West Germany	Bic	DNF	—	
45	Anatole Novak	France	Bic	49	+ 1h 30' 07"	
46	Michel Grain	France	Bic	37	+ 47' 55"	
47	Paul Lemeteyer	France	Bic	43	+ 1h 07' 58"	
48	Jean Milesi	France	Bic	DNF	—	
49	Jean Graczyk	France	Bic	DNF	—	
50	Michael Wright	Great Britain	Bic	14	+ 14' 57"	
51	Carlos Echeverría Zudaire	Spain	SD Kas	8	+ 6' 00"	
52	José Pérez Francés	Spain	SD Kas	2	+ 2' 15"	
53	Antonio Gómez del Moral	Spain	SD Kas	7	+ 5' 55"	
54	Gregorio San Miguel	Spain	SD Kas	36	+ 46' 51"	
55	Vicente López Carril	Spain	SD Kas	34	+ 40' 28"	
56	Sebastián Elorza	Spain	SD Kas	25	+ 30' 52"	
57	José Manuel Lasa	Spain	SD Kas	27	+ 32' 25"	
58	Aurelio González Puente	Spain	SD Kas	DNF	—	
59	José Luis Errandonea	Spain	SD Kas	DNF	—	
60	Andrés Gandarias	Spain	SD Kas	19	+ 19' 54"	
61	Rudi Altig	West Germany	Salvarani	18	+ 18' 43"	
62	Tommaso de Pra	Italy	Salvarani	DNF	—	
63	Giancarlo Ferretti	Italy	Salvarani	30	+ 36' 36"	
64	Felice Gimondi	Italy	Salvarani	1	78h 29' 00"	
65	Pietro Guerra	Italy	Salvarani	46	+ 1h 12' 20"	
66	Mario Minieri	Italy	Salvarani	50	+ 1h 35' 00"	
67	Pietro Partesotti	Italy	Salvarani	DNF	—	
68	Wilfried Peffgen	West Germany	Salvarani	22	+ 24' 41"	
69	Roberto Poggiali	Italy	Salvarani	35	+ 45' 01"	
70	Dino Zandegù	Italy	Salvarani	DNF	—	
71	Fernando Manzaneque	Spain	GD Karpy	21	+ 21' 54"	
72	Manuel Martín Piñera	Spain	GD Karpy	40	+ 59' 26"	
73	José Manuel Mesa Fernández	Spain	GD Karpy	DNF	—	
74	Juan María Uribezubia	Spain	GD Karpy	29	+ 35' 55"	
75	Juan José Sagarduy	Spain	GD Karpy	41	+ 1h 01' 39"	
76	José Goyeneche	Spain	GD Karpy	48	+ 1h 18' 55"	
77	Bruno Sivilotti Pidutti	Italy	GD Karpy	DNF	—	
78	Andres Incera Paradelo	Spain	GD Karpy	DNF	—	
79	Domingo Fernández	Spain	GD Karpy	51	+ 1h 46' 09"	
80	Jesús Isasi Aspiazu	Spain	GD Karpy	DNF	—	
81	Antonio Bailetti	Italy	GD Faema	DNF	—	
82	Victor Van Schil	Belgium	GD Faema	23	+ 24' 50"	
83	Jozef Spruyt	Belgium	GD Faema	10	+ 7' 50"	
84	Martin Van Den Bossche	Belgium	GD Faema	38	+ 53' 07"	
85	Mino Denti	Italy	GD Faema	DNF	—	
86	Luciano Soave	Italy	GD Faema	39	+ 55' 35"	
87	Vittorio Adorni	Italy	GD Faema	5	+ 5' 26"	
88	Julien Delocht	Belgium	GD Faema	DNF	—	
89	Lino Farisato	Italy	GD Faema	45	+ 1h 10' 55"	
90	Pietro Scandelli	Italy	GD Faema	DNF	—	
