= 1967 Vuelta a España =

Race details
- Dates: 27 April – 14 May
- Stages: 18
- Distance: 2,940.5 km (1,827 mi)
- Winning time: 76h 38' 04"

Results
Jersey awarded to the overall winner	Winner	Jan Janssen (Netherlands)	(Pelforth)
	Second	Jean-Pierre Ducasse (France)	(Pelforth)
	Third	Aurelio González Puente (Spain)	(Kas-Kaskol)
Jersey awarded to the points classification winner	Points	Jan Janssen (Netherlands)	(Pelforth)
	Mountains	Mariano Díaz (Spain)	(Fagor)
	Sprints	José Manuel López Rodríguez (ESP)	(Fagor)

The 22nd Edition Vuelta a España (Tour of Spain), a long-distance bicycle stage race and one of the three grand tours, was held from 27 April to 14 May 1967. It consisted of 18 stages covering a total of 2,940.5 km (1,827.1 mi), and was won by Jan Janssen of the Pelforth cycling team. Janssen also won the points classification and Mariano Diaz won the mountains classification.

== Route ==
List of stages
Stage	Date	Course	Distance	Type	Winner
1a	27 April	Vigo to O Baixo Miño	110 km (68 mi)		Guido Reybrouck (BEL)
1b	27 April	Vigo to Vigo	4.1 km (3 mi)	Individual time trial	Jan Janssen (NED)
2	28 April	Pontevedra to Ourense	186 km (116 mi)		Domingo Perurena (ESP)
3	29 April	Ourense to Astorga	230 km (143 mi)		Ramón Sáez (ESP)
4	30 April	Astorga to Salamanca	201 km (125 mi)		Ramón Sáez (ESP)
5	1 May	Salamanca to Madrid	201 km (125 mi)		Tom Simpson (GBR)
6	2 May	Albacete to Benidorm	212 km (132 mi)		Evert Dolman (NED)
7	3 May	Benidorm to Valencia	148 km (92 mi)		Gerben Karstens (NED)
8	4 May	Valencia to Vinaròs	145 km (90 mi)		Gilbert Bellone (FRA)
9	5 May	Vinaròs to Sitges	172 km (107 mi)		Jan Lauwers (BEL)
10a	6 May	Sitges to Barcelona	39 km (24 mi)		Jan Harings (NED)
10b	6 May	Barcelona to Barcelona	45.4 km (28 mi)		Gerben Karstens (NED)
11	7 May	Barcelona to Andorra la Vella	241 km (150 mi)		Mariano Díaz (ESP)
12	8 May	Andorra la Vella to Lleida	158 km (98 mi)		Henk Nijdam (NED)
13	9 May	Lleida to Zaragoza	182 km (113 mi)		Ángel Ibáñez (ESP)
14	10 May	Zaragoza to Pamplona	193 km (120 mi)		Jos van der Vleuten (NED)
15a	11 May	Pamplona to Logroño	92 km (57 mi)		Rolf Wolfshohl (FRG)
15b	11 May	Laguardia to Vitoria	44 km (27 mi)	Individual time trial	Raymond Poulidor (FRA)
16	12 May	Vitoria to San Sebastián	139 km (86 mi)		Tom Simpson (GBR)
17	13 May	Villabona to Zarautz	28 km (17 mi)	Individual time trial	Gerben Karstens (NED)
18	14 May	Zarautz to Bilbao	175 km (109 mi)		Gerben Karstens (NED)
	Total		2,940.5 km (1,827 mi)		

== Results ==
=== Final general classification ===
Final general classification (1–25)
Rank	Rider	Team	Time
1	(Netherlands) Jan Janssen	Pelforth	76h 38' 04"
2	(France) Jean-Pierre Ducasse	Pelforth	+ 1' 43"
3	(Spain) Aurelio González Puente	Kas-Kaskol	+ 1' 45"
4	(Spain) Luis Otaño Arcelus	Fagor	+ 2' 39"
5	(Netherlands) Cees Haast	Televizier	+ 3' 20"
6	(Spain) José Manuel Lopez	Fagor	+ 3' 41"
7	(Spain) Gregorio San Miguel	Kas-Kaskol	+ 4' 19"
8	(France) Raymond Poulidor	Mercier-BP-Hutchinson	+ 4' 20"
9	(Spain) Mariano Diaz	Fagor	+ 5' 54"
10	(Spain) José Pérez Francés	Kas-Kaskol	+ 6' 04"
11	(Spain) Angelino Soler	Karpy	
12	(Spain) José Antonio Pontón	Ferrys	
13	(Netherlands) Arie den Hartog	Bic	
14	(Spain) Vicente Lopez	Kas-Kaskol	
15	(West Germany) Rolf Wolfshohl	Bic	
16	(Spain) Carlos Echeverría	Kas-Kaskol	
17	(Spain) Eusebio Vélez	Kas-Kaskol	
18	(Spain) Fernando Manzaneque	Ferrys	
19	(Spain) Antonio Gómez del Moral	Kas-Kaskol	
20	(Spain) Julio Jiménez Muñoz	Bic	
21	(Spain) Ramón Mendiburu	Fagor	
22	(Italy) Silvano Schiavon	Vittadello	
23	(Spain) José María Errandonea	Fagor	
24	(Spain) Ginés García Perán	Fagor	
25	(Italy) Aldo Moser	Vittadello	
