= 1966 Vuelta a España =

Race details
- Dates: 28 April – 15 May
- Stages: 18
- Distance: 2,949.5 km (1,833 mi)
- Winning time: 78h 53' 55"

Results
Jersey awarded to the overall winner	Winner	Francisco Gabica (ESP)	(Kas–Kaskol)
	Second	Eusebio Vélez (ESP)	(Kas–Kaskol)
	Third	Carlos Echeverría (ESP)	(Kas–Kaskol)
Jersey awarded to the points classification winner	Points	Jos van der Vleuten (NED)	(Televizier – Batavus)
	Mountains	Gregorio San Miguel (ESP)	(Kas–Kaskol)
	Sprints	Domingo Perurena (ESP)	(Fagor)

The 21st Edition Vuelta a España (Tour of Spain), a long-distance bicycle stage race and one of the three grand tours, was held from 28 April to 15 May 1966. It consisted of 18 stages covering a total of 2,949.5 km (1,832.7 mi), and was won by Francisco Gabica of the Kas–Kaskol cycling team. Jos van der Vleuten won the points classification and Gregorio San Miguel won the mountains classification.

== Route ==
List of stages
Stage	Date	Course	Distance	Type	Winner
1a	28 April	Murcia to Murcia	111 km (69 mi)		Bruno Sivilotti (ITA)
1b	28 April	Murcia to Murcia	3.5 km (2 mi)	Individual time trial	José María Errandonea (ESP)
2a	29 April	Murcia to La Manga	81 km (50 mi)		Enzo Pretolani (ITA)
2b	29 April	La Manga to Benidorm	153 km (95 mi)		Ramón Mendiburu (ESP)
3	30 April	Benidorm to Valencia	148 km (92 mi)		José Antonio Momeñe (ESP)
4	1 May	Cuenca to Madrid	177 km (110 mi)		Valentín Uriona (ESP)
5	2 May	Madrid to Madrid	181 km (112 mi)		Carlos Echeverría (ESP)
6	3 May	Madrid to Calatayud	225 km (140 mi)		Jo de Roo (NED)
7	4 May	Calatayud to Zaragoza	105 km (65 mi)		Cees Haast (NED)
8	5 May	Zaragoza to Lleida	144 km (89 mi)		Henk Nijdam (NED)
9	6 May	Lleida to Las Colinas	128 km (80 mi)		Antonio Gómez del Moral (ESP)
10a	7 May	Sitges to Barcelona	40 km (25 mi)		Luis Otaño (ESP)
10b	7 May	Barcelona to Barcelona	49 km (30 mi)		Henk Nijdam (NED)
11	8 May	Barcelona to Huesca	266 km (165 mi)		Mario Zanin (ITA)
12	9 May	Huesca to Pamplona	221 km (137 mi)		Gerben Karstens (NED)
13	10 May	Pamplona to San Sebastián	131 km (81 mi)		Cees Haast (NED)
14	11 May	San Sebastián to Vitoria	178 km (111 mi)		Gregorio San Miguel (ESP)
15a	12 May	Vitoria to Haro	61 km (38 mi)	Individual time trial	Francisco Gabica (ESP)
15b	12 May	Haro to Logroño	52 km (32 mi)		Gerben Karstens (NED)
16	13 May	Logroño to Burgos	116 km (72 mi)		Henk Nijdam (NED)
17	14 May	Burgos to Santander	226 km (140 mi)		Gerben Karstens (NED)
18	15 May	Santander to Bilbao	154 km (96 mi)		Domingo Perurena (ESP)
	Total		2,949.5 km (1,833 mi)		

== Results ==
=== Final General Classification ===
Rank	Rider	Team	Time
1	Francisco Gabica (ESP)	Kas–Kaskol	78h 53' 55"
2	Eusebio Vélez (ESP)	Kas–Kaskol	+ 39"
3	Carlos Echeverría (ESP)	Kas–Kaskol	+ 44"
4	Luis Otaño (ESP)	Fagor	+ 2' 17"
5	José Antonio Momeñe (ESP)	Kas–Kaskol	+ 2' 25"
6	Valentín Uriona (ESP)	Kas–Kaskol	+ 2' 44"
7	Antonio Gómez del Moral (ESP)	Kas–Kaskol	+ 3' 52"
8	Cees Haast (NED)	Televizier	+ 3' 55"
9	Angelino Soler (ESP)	Ferrys	+ 4' 37"
10	José María Errandonea (ESP)	Fagor	+ 4' 40"
11	Sebastián Elorza (ESP)	Kas–Kaskol	
12	Domingo Perurena (ESP)	Fagor	
13	Gregorio San Miguel (ESP)	Kas–Kaskol	
14	Mariano Díaz (ESP)	Fagor	
15	José Manuel López (ESP)	Fagor	
16	Eduardo Castelló (ESP)	Ferrys	
17	Jos van der Vleuten (NED)	Televizier	
18	Aldo Moser (ITA)	Vittadello	
19	Ramon Sáez Marzo (ESP)	Ferrys	
20	Juan María Uribezubia (ESP)	Kas–Kaskol	
21	Gerben Karstens (NED)	Televizier	
22	Henk Nijdam (NED)	Televizier	
23	Luis Pedro Santamarina (ESP)	Fagor	
24	Rik Wouters (NED)	Televizier	
25	Dieter Puschel (FRG)	Wiels-Groene Leeuw	
