= Nijdam =

Nijdam is a Dutch surname. Notable people with the surname include:

- Henk Nijdam (1935–2009), Dutch cyclist
- Jelle Nijdam (born 1963), Dutch cyclist, son of Henk
