= 1964 Volta a Catalunya =

Race details
- Dates: 13–20 September 1964
- Stages: 8
- Distance: 1,295.9 km (805.2 mi)
- Winning time: 36h 14' 17"

Results
	Winner	Joseph Carrara (FRA)
	Second	Pasquale Fabbri (ITA)
	Third	José María Errandonea (ESP)

The 1964 Volta a Catalunya was the 44th edition of the Volta a Catalunya cycle race and was held from 13 September to 20 September 1964. The race started in Castelldefels and finished in Barcelona. The race was won by Joseph Carrara.

== General classification ==
Final general classification

Rank	Rider	Time
1	Joseph Carrara (FRA)	36h 14' 17"
2	Pasquale Fabbri (ITA)	+ 3' 13"
3	José María Errandonea (ESP)	+ 4' 05"
4	Salvador Honrubia (ESP)	+ 7' 16"
5	Rogelio Hernández (ESP)	+ 8' 32"
6	Fernando Manzaneque (ESP)	+ 8' 47"
7	Primo Nardello (ITA)	+ 9' 02"
8	Francisco Gabica (ESP)	+ 10' 28"
9	Antonio Gómez del Moral (ESP)	+ 10' 53"
10	Angelino Soler (ESP)	+ 11' 24"
