= 1965 Volta a Catalunya =

Race details
- Dates: 12–19 September 1965
- Stages: 8
- Distance: 1,114 km (692.2 mi)
- Winning time: 29h 08' 07"

Results
| | Winner | Antonio Gómez del Moral (ESP) |
| | Second | Carlos Echeverría (ESP) |
| | Third | Roberto Poggiali (ITA) |

The 1965 Volta a Catalunya was the 45th edition of the Volta a Catalunya cycle race and was held from 12 September to 19 September 1965. The race started in Tortosa and finished in Barcelona. The race was won by Antonio Gómez del Moral.

== General classification ==
Final general classification

| Rank | Rider | Time |
|---|---|---|
| 1 | Antonio Gómez del Moral (ESP) | 29h 08' 07" |
| 2 | Carlos Echeverría (ESP) | + 6' 14" |
| 3 | Roberto Poggiali (ITA) | + 7' 02" |
| 4 | Ginés García Perán (ESP) | + 7' 17" |
| 5 | Antonio Suárez (ESP) | + 9' 25" |
| 6 | Imerio Massignan (ITA) | + 9' 30" |
| 7 | Hans Junkermann (FRG) | + 9' 49" |
| 8 | Johny Schleck (LUX) | + 9' 54" |
| 9 | Francisco Gabica (ESP) | + 9' 54" |
| 10 | Valentín Uriona (ESP) | + 11' 07" |
