= 1962 Volta a Catalunya =

Race details
- Dates: 9–16 September 1962
- Stages: 8
- Distance: 1,339.5 km (832.3 mi)
- Winning time: 36h 55' 08"

Results
	Winner	Antonio Karmany (ESP)
	Second	Manuel Martín Piñera (ESP)
	Third	Ginés García Perán (ESP)

The 1962 Volta a Catalunya was the 42nd edition of the Volta a Catalunya cycle race and was held from 9 September to 16 September 1962. The race started in Montjuïc and finished in Barcelona. The race was won by Antonio Karmany.

== General classification ==
Final general classification

Rank	Rider	Time
1	Antonio Karmany (ESP)	36h 55' 08"
2	Manuel Martín Piñera (ESP)	+ 32"
3	Ginés García Perán (ESP)	+ 50"
4	Piet van Est (NED)	+ 59"
5	Fernando Manzaneque (ESP)	+ 3' 33"
6	Gabriel Mas (ESP)	+ 3' 54"
7	Valentín Uriona (ESP)	+ 4' 00"
8	José Pérez Francés (ESP)	+ 5' 05"
9	Bruno Mealli (ITA)	+ 5' 27"
10	Francisco Gabica (ESP)	+ 5' 55"
