= Klasika Primavera =

Spanish one-day road cycling race

Clasica Primavera
Race details
- Date: April
- Region: Basque Country, Spain
- English name: Spring classic
- Local name(s): Klasika Primavera (in Basque); Gran Premio de Primavera (in Spanish)
- Discipline: Road race
- Competition: UCI Europe Tour
- Type: Single-day
- Organiser: Sociedad Ciclista Amorebieta
- Web site: www.scamorebieta.com/klasika/

History
- First edition: 1946
- Editions: 65 (as of 2019)
- First winner: Dalmacio Langarica (ESP)
- Most wins: Eusebio Vélez (ESP); Federico Echave (ESP); Alejandro Valverde (ESP) (3 wins)
- Most recent: Carlos Betancur (COL)

The Klasika Primavera (English: Spring classic) is a single-day road bicycle race held annually in April in Amorebieta, Spain. Since 2005, the race is organised as a 1.1 event on the UCI Europe Tour.

Established in 1946 as Gran Premio de Primavera, it is now held as Klasika Primavera. It is also known as Clásica de Amorebieta.

== Winners ==
Year	Country	Rider	Team
1946	Spain	Dalmacio Langarica	Galindo–Cicles Tabay
1947	Spain	Miguel Poblet	Real Sociedad
1948–1954	No race		
1955	Spain	Hortensio Vidaurreta	Peña Solera
1956	Spain	Cosme Barrutia	Splendid–d'Alessandro
1957	Spain	Emilio Cruz	Boxing Club
1958	Spain	Antonio Karmany	Lube
1959	Spain	Roberto Morales	KAS
1960	Spain	Carmelo Morales	KAS–Boxing
1961	Spain	Julio San Emeterio	Ferrys
1962	Spain	Francisco Gabica	KAS
1963	Spain	Eusebio Vélez	KAS–Kaskol
1964	Spain	Eusebio Vélez	KAS–Kaskol
1965	Spain	José Pérez Francés	Ferrys
1966	Spain	Antonio Gómez del Moral	KAS–Kaskol
1967	Spain	Antonio Gómez del Moral	KAS–Kaskol
1968	Spain	Eusebio Vélez	Fagor–Fargas
1969	Spain	José Manuel Lasa	Pepsi Cola
1970	Spain	Carlos Echeverría	KAS–Kaskol
1971	Spain	Domingo Perurena	KAS–Kaskol
1972	Spain	José Gómez	Werner
1973	Spain	Miguel María Lasa	KAS–Kaskol
1974	Spain	Andrés Oliva	La Casera–Peña Bahamontes
1975	Spain	Antonio Martos	KAS–Kaskol
1976	Spain	Enrique Cima	Novostil–Transmallorca
1977	Spain	Vicente López Carril	KAS–Campagnolo
1978	Spain	Domingo Perurena	KAS–Campagnolo
1979	Spain	Miguel María Lasa	Moliner–Vereco
1980	Spain	Juan Fernández	Fosforera–Vereco
1981	Spain	José Luís López Cerron	Zor–Helios
1982	Spain	Jesús Suárez Cueva	Reynolds
1983	Spain	Juan Fernández	Zor–Gemeaz–Cusin
1984	Spain	José Luís Navarro	Zor–Gemeaz
1985	Spain	Federico Echave	Teka
1986	Spain	Federico Echave	Teka
1987	Spain	Julián Gorospe	Reynolds
1988	Denmark	Jørgen V. Pedersen	B.H. Sport
1989	Spain	Marino Lejarreta	Caja Rural–Paternina
1990	Spain	Iñaki Gastón	CLAS–Cajastur
1991	Spain	Jesús Montoya	Amaya Seguros
1992	Spain	Federico Echave	CLAS–Cajastur
1993	Spain	Jon Unzaga	CLAS–Cajastur
1994	Spain	Melcior Mauri	Banesto
1995	France	Laurent Jalabert	ONCE
1996	Switzerland	Mauro Gianetti	Polti
1997	Spain	Mikel Zarrabeitia	ONCE
1998	Spain	Roberto Heras	Kelme–Costa Blanca
1999	Spain	Roberto Heras	Kelme–Costa Blanca
2000	Venezuela	Unai Etxebarria	Euskaltel–Euskadi
2001	Spain	Igor Astarloa	Mercatone Uno–Stream TV
2002	Spain	Ángel Vicioso	Kelme–Costa Blanca
2003	Spain	Alejandro Valverde	Kelme–Costa Blanca
2004	Spain	Alejandro Valverde	Comunidad Valenciana–Kelme
2005	Spain	David Etxebarría	Liberty Seguros–Würth
2006	Spain	Carlos Sastre	Team CSC
2007	Spain	Joaquim Rodríguez	Caisse d'Epargne
2008	Italy	Damiano Cunego	Lampre
2009	Spain	Alejandro Valverde	Caisse d'Epargne
2010	Spain	Samuel Sánchez	Euskaltel–Euskadi
2011	France	Jonathan Hivert	Saur–Sojasun
2012	Italy	Giovanni Visconti	Movistar Team
2013	Portugal	Rui Costa	Movistar Team
2014	Spain	Pello Bilbao	Caja Rural–Seguros RGA
2015	Spain	José Herrada	Movistar Team
2016	Italy	Giovanni Visconti	Movistar Team
2017	Spain	Gorka Izagirre	Movistar Team
2018	Costa Rica	Andrey Amador	Movistar Team
2019	Colombia	Carlos Betancur	Movistar Team
