= Gran Premio de Llodio =

Race details
- Date: Early June
- Region: Basque Country, Spain
- English name: Gran Prix of Llodio
- Local name(s): Gran Premio Internacional de Llodio(in Spanish); Laudioko Nazioarteko Sari Nagusia(in Basque)
- Discipline: Road
- Competition: UCI Europe Tour
- Type: Single-day

History
- First edition: 1949
- Editions: 62 (as of 2011)
- Final edition: 2011
- First winner: Félix Vidaurreta (ESP)
- Most wins: Domingo Perurena (ESP) (3 wins)
- Final winner: Santiago Pérez (ESP)

Gran Premio Internacional de Llodio (also known as Clásica de Álava) is a Spanish professional cycle road race that was held in Llodio, Basque Country, between 1949 and 2011. From 2005 to 2011, the race was organised as a 1.1 event on the UCI Europe Tour.

== Winners ==
Year	Country	Rider	Team
1949	Spain	Felix Vidaurreta	Touring
1950	Spain	Jesús Morales	individual
1951	Spain	Carmelo Morales	individual
1952	Spain	Jesús Galdeano	individual
1953	Spain	Antonio Barrutia	individual
1954	Spain	Antonio Barrutia	Gamma
1955	Spain	Martín Erausquin	individual
1956	Spain	Roberto Morales	Faema–Guerra
1957	Spain	Carlos Pérez	CIL Bicicletas–Indauchu
1958	Spain	Antonio Ferraz	KAS–Boxing Club
1959	Spain	Antonio Ferraz	Boxing
1960	Spain	Julio Jimenez	Catigene
1961	Spain	José Bernárdez	Licor 43
1962	Spain	Juan Maria Balier	Espumosos Gorbea
1963	Spain	Valentín Uriona	KAS–Kaskol
1964	Spain	Juan José Sagarduy	KAS–Kaskol
1965	Spain	Andres Incera	Olsa
1966	Spain	José Manuel López Rodríguez	Fagor
1967	Spain	José Antonio Momeñe	Fagor
1968	Spain	Luis Ocaña	Fagor–Fargas
1969	Spain	Domingo Perurena	Fagor
1970	Spain	Domingo Perurena	KAS–Kaskol
1971	Spain	Celestino Padilla	
1972	Spain	Domingo Perurena	KAS–Kaskol
1973	Spain	Francisco Elorriaga	KAS–Kaskol
1974	Spain	Antonio Menéndez	KAS–Kaskol
1975	Spain	José Luis Uribezubia	Super Ser
1976	Spain	Luis Alberto Ordiales	Novostil–Transmallorca
1977	Spain	Bernardo Alfonsel	Teka
1978	Spain	Ismael Lejarreta	KAS–Campagnolo
1979	Spain	Francisco Albelda	Transmallorca–Flavia
1980	Spain	Felipe Yáñez	Kelme
1981	Spain	Jorge Ruiz Cabestany	Teka
1982	Spain	Antonio Coll	Teka
1983	No race		
1984	Spain	Alfonso Gutiérrez	Teka
1985	Spain	Julián Gorospe	Reynolds
1986	Spain	Ángel Camarillo	Zor–B.H. Sport
1987	Spain	Pello Ruiz Cabestany	Caja Rural–Seat
1988	Spain	Carlos Hernandez	Teka
1989	Spain	Manuel Jorge Domínguez	B.H. Sport
1990	Spain	Aitor Garmendia	Banesto
1991	Spain	Juan Carlos Martin	Amaya Seguros
1992	Spain	Ángel Edo	Kelme
1993	Spain	Miguel Ángel Martínez Torres	ONCE
1994	Russia	Asiat Saitov	Kelme
1995	Spain	Marino Alonso	Banesto
1996	Spain	David Etxebarria	ONCE
1997	Spain	José Rodriguez Garcia	Kelme–Costa Blanca
1998	Russia	Serguei Smetanine	Vitalicio Seguros–Grupo Generali
1999	Italy	Marco Velo	Mercatone Uno–Bianchi
2000	Spain	Miguel Ángel Martín Perdiguero	Vitalicio Seguros–Grupo Generali
2001	Spain	Juan José de los Ángeles	Kelme–Costa Blanca
2002	Spain	Iván Gutiérrez	iBanesto.com
2003	Spain	Juan Fuentes Angullo	Saeco
2004	Venezuela	Unai Etxebarria	Euskaltel–Euskadi
2005	Spain	David Herrero	Euskaltel–Euskadi
2006	Spain	Jaume Rovira	Andalucía–Paul Versan
2007	Spain	David de la Fuente	Saunier Duval–Prodir
2008	Spain	Héctor Guerra	Liberty Seguros
2009	Spain	Samuel Sánchez	Euskaltel–Euskadi
2010	Spain	Ángel Vicioso	Andalucía–Cajasur
2011	Spain	Santiago Pérez	Barbot–Efapel
