= José Bernárdez =

Spanish cyclist (1935–2018)

Personal information
- Born: 1 October 1935 Santiago de Compostela, Spain
- Died: 12 March 2018 (aged 82)

Cycling career
- Sport: Cycling
- Discipline: Road
- Role: Rider

José Bernárdez (1 October 1935 – 12 March 2018) was a Spanish racing cyclist. He rode in the 1964 Tour de France and in five editions of the Vuelta a España. He also finished fourth in the road race at the 1961 UCI Road World Championships.

== Major results ==
1961
1st Gran Premio de Llodio
2nd GP Ayutamiento de Bilbao
4th Road race, UCI Road World Championships
1962
8th Overall Critérium du Dauphiné Libéré
8th Overall Euskal Bizikleta
