= Roland Van De Rijse =

Belgian cyclist

Personal information
- Born: 2 August 1942 (age 84) Beernem, Belgium
- Height: 179 cm (5 ft 10 in)
- Weight: 71 kg (157 lb)

Cycling career
- Sport: Cycling

Roland Van De Rijse (born 2 August 1942) is a former Belgian cyclist. He competed in the team time trial and the team pursuit events at the 1964 Summer Olympics.
