= Francisco Gabica =

Spanish cyclist (1937–2014)

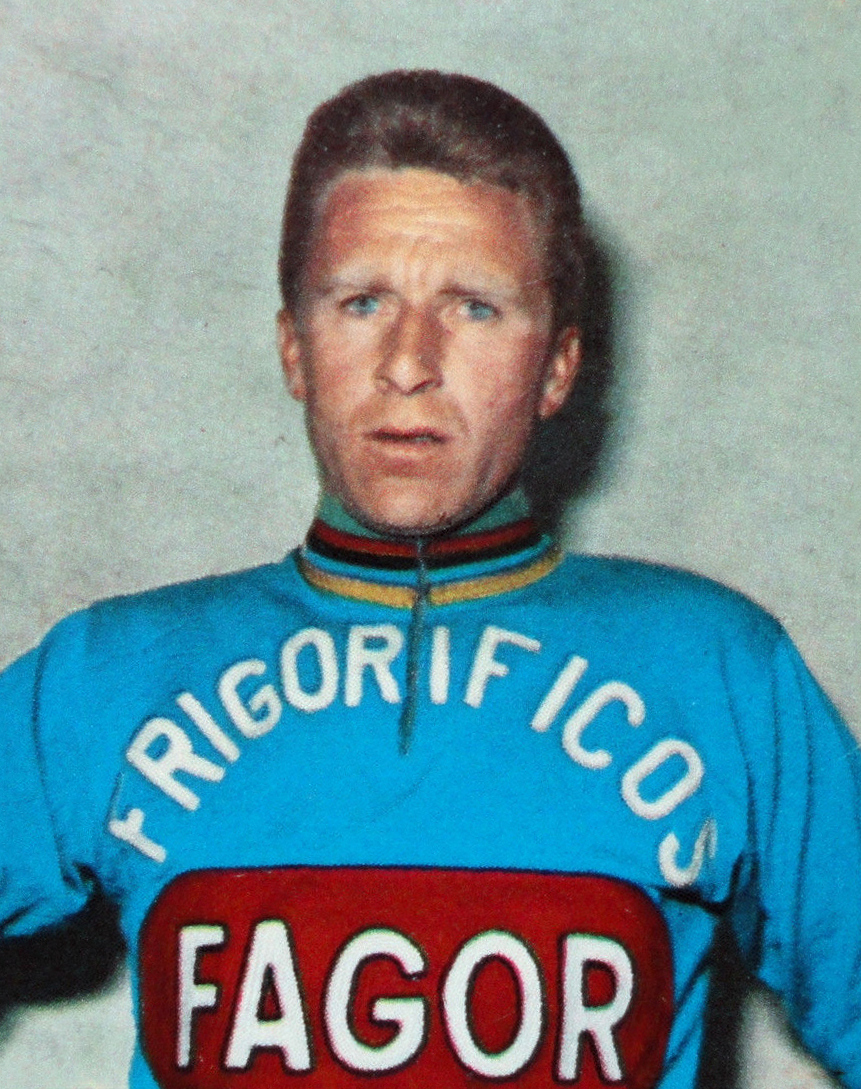
- Francisco Gabica in 1968

Personal information
- Full name: Francisco Gabicagogueascoa Ibarra
- Born: 31 December 1937 Ispaster, Spain
- Died: 7 July 2014 (aged 76)

Cycling career
- Sport: Cycling
- Current team: Retired
- Discipline: Road
- Role: Rider

Professional teams
- 1961—1966: Kas–Royal Asport
- 1967—1969: Fagor
- 1970—1972: Kas–Kaskol

Major wins
- Grand Tours Vuelta a España General classification (1966) Mountains classification (1968) 1 individual stage (1966) Giro d'Italia 1 individual stage (1967) One-day races and Classics National Road Race Championships (1967)

Francisco Gabicagogueascoa Ibarra (31 December 1937 – 7 July 2014) was a professional road bicycle racer between 1961 and 1972. Of his 21 professional victories, Gabica is most famous for winning the 1966 Vuelta a España, besting runner-up Eusebio Vélez and third-place finisher Carlos Echeverría, both compatriots. At the 1968 Vuelta, Gabica captured three mountainous stages to win the climbers classification.

== Major results ==
1961
2nd Overall Tour de l'Avenir
7th Overall Euskal Bizikleta

1st Stage 5

1962
1st Klasika Primavera
3rd Overall Euskal Bizikleta
3rd GP Ayutamiento de Bilbao
5th Overall Vuelta a España
5th Subida a Arrate
10th Overall Volta a Catalunya
1963
1st GP Torrelavega
1st Stage 4 Grand Prix de Torrelavega
5th Overall Vuelta a España
5th Overall Euskal Bizikleta
6th Overall Volta a Catalunya
6th Grand Prix du Parisien
1964
1st Campeonato Vasco Navarro de Montaña
1st Prix de Pola de Lena
2nd Subida a Arrate
4th Overall Critérium du Dauphiné Libéré

1st Stage 7

8th Overall Volta a Catalunya

1st Stage 3b

9th Overall Vuelta a España
1965
1st Grand Prix de Zumaia
1st Stages 2 & 6 Volta a la Comunitat Valenciana
6th Overall Vuelta a España
9th Overall Volta a Catalunya

1st Stages 1 & 5a

10th Overall Tour de France
1966
1st Overall Vuelta a España

1st Stage 15a

2nd Overall Gran Premio Fedrácion Catalana de Ciclismo
3rd Overall Critérium du Dauphiné Libéré

1st Stage 1

5th Overall Setmana Catalana de Ciclisme
7th Overall Tour de France
8th Trofeo Masferrer
1967
1st Road race National Road Championships
8th Overall Giro d'Italia

1st Stage 17

1968
1st Mountains classification
1st Stage 7 Volta a Catalunya
3rd Overall Euskal Bizikleta
8th Overall Giro d'Italia
9th Trofeo Dicen
1969
2nd Overall Tour of the Basque Country
10th Overall Vuelta Ciclista a La Rioja
1970
1st GP Villafranca de Ordizia
1st Mémorial Uriona
1st Trophée Grutas San Jose
4th Overall Vuelta a Mallorca
1971
5th Overall Vuelta Ciclista al Pais Vasco

=== Grand Tour general classification results timeline ===
Grand Tour general classification results
Grand Tour	1961	1962	1963	1964	1965	1966	1967	1968	1969	1970	1971
Vuelta a España	30	5	5	9	6	1	DNF	13	16	22	35
Giro d'Italia	—	—	—	—	—	—	8	8	—	—	33
Tour de France	—	—	14	13	10	7	—	—	24	23	—

Legend
—	Did not compete
DNF	Did not finish
