= Valentín Uriona =

Spanish cyclist (1940 - 1967

- Uriona in 1967

Personal information
- Full name: Valentín Uriona Laucirica
- Born: 29 August 1940 Muxika, Spain
- Died: 30 July 1967 (aged 26) Sabadell, Spain

Cycling career
- Sport: Cycling
- Discipline: Road
- Role: Rider

Professional teams
- 1961–1962: Funcor-Munguia
- 1963–1966: Kas–Kaskol
- 1967: Fagor

Major wins
- Grand Tours Vuelta a España 2 individual stages (1963, 1966) Stage races Dauphiné Libéré (1964) One-day races and Classics Milano–Torino (1964)

Valentín Uriona Laucirica (29 August 1940 - 30 July 1967) was a Spanish professional road racing cyclist. He died in 1967 after he crashed during Spanish Road Championships in Sabadell.

== Major results ==
1962
1st Stage 9, Milk Race
1st Stage 1a, Volta a Catalunya
1963
1st GP Llodio
1st Stage 7, Vuelta a España
Volta a Catalunya

4th Overall
1st Stage 7b

1st Stage 4 Euskal Bizikleta (TTT)
1964
1st Milano–Torino
1st Overall, Critérium du Dauphiné Libéré
1st Stage 8, Volta a Catalunya
1st Stage 4 Euskal Bizikleta (TTT)
Volta a la Comunitat Valenciana
1st Stage 1 (TTT) and Stage 5
1965
1st Stages 1 and 8, Volta a Catalunya
2nd GP Vizcaya
2nd Grand Prix Navarre
1966
Spain Hill Climb Championship
1st Stage 4, Vuelta a España
1st Stage 7 Volta a la Comunitat Valenciana

== See also ==
- List of racing cyclists and pacemakers with a cycling-related death
