= Danilo Ferrari =

Italian cyclist (1940–2007)

Personal information
- Born: 30 September 1940 Chioggia
- Died: 19 January 2007 (aged 66) Mongrando

Cycling career
- Sport: Cycling
- Role: Rider

Danilo Ferrari (30 September 1940 – 19 January 2007) was an Italian racing cyclist. He rode in the 1963 Tour de France.
