= Sebastián Elorza =

Spanish cyclist

Personal information
- Born: 17 January 1939 (age 87)

Cycling career
- Sport: Cycling
- Role: Rider

Sebastián Elorza (born 17 January 1939) is a Spanish racing cyclist. He rode in the 1963 Tour de France.
