= José Manuel López Rodríguez =

Spanish cyclist

José Manuel López
Personal information
- Born: 21 February 1940 (age 86) Caboalles de Abajo (Castilla y León), Spain

Cycling career
- Sport: Cycling
- Current team: Retired
- Discipline: Road
- Role: Rider

Professional teams
- 1965: Ferrys
- 1966–1969: Fagor
- 1970: La Casera–Peña Bahamontes
- 1971–1972: Werner

José Manuel López Rodríguez (Note: In this Spanish name, the first or paternal surname is López and the second or maternal family name is Rodríguez.) (born 21 February 1940) is a former Spanish cyclist. He competed in the individual road race and team time trial events at the 1964 Summer Olympics. He rode in seven editions of the Vuelta a España and four times in the Tour de France.

== Major results ==
1964
5th Road race, Summer Olympics
1965
1st Overall Circuit de la Sarthe
2nd Team time trial, World Road Championships
2nd Overall Tour de l'Avenir
1966
1st GP Llodio
1st Overall Setmana Catalana de Ciclisme
3rd Trofeo Jaumendreu
1967
2nd Klasika Primavera
3rd GP Vizcaya
6th Overall Vuelta a España
9th Overall Tour de Suisse
1968
1st GP Navarra
1st Stages 3 & 7 Vuelta a Levante
1969
1st Stage 9 Vuelta a España
1st Stage 1 Vuelta a Levante
2nd Prueba Villafranca de Ordizia
2nd Overall Vuelta a Levante
2nd Overall GP Leganes
3rd GP Vizcaya
1970
1st Six Days of Madrid (with Domingo Perurena)
1st Stage 6 Vuelta a Levante
1st Stage 4 Vuelta a La Rioja
3rd Trofeo Elola
1971
1st Overall Vuelta a Levante

1st Stage 1

1st Stage 4 Setmana Catalana de Ciclisme
2nd GP Pascuas
2nd Klasika Primavera
3rd Clásica Sabiñánigo
3rd Overall GP Leganes
3rd Prueba Villafranca de Ordizia
1972
1st Trofeo Elola
2nd Clásica Sabiñánigo
2nd Overall GP Leganes
3rd GP Llodio
