= Pasquale Fabbri =

Italian cyclist

Personal information
- Born: 2 April 1942 (age 84) Galeata

Cycling career
- Sport: Cycling
- Role: Rider

Pasquale Fabbri (born 2 April 1942) is an Italian racing cyclist. He rode in the 1966 Tour de France.
