= Luis Otaño =

Spanish cyclist

Personal information
- Full name: Luis Otaño Arcelus
- Born: 26 January 1934 (age 92) Errenteria, Spain

Cycling career
- Sport: Cycling
- Discipline: Road
- Role: Rider

Professional teams
- 1957: Real Union Irun–Hojas Palmera
- 1958: Caobania–S.D. Beasain
- 1958: Mobylette GAC
- 1959: Licor 43
- 1959: Peugeot–BP–Dunlop
- 1960–1961: Saint-Raphael–Geminiani
- 1961: Licor 43
- 1962–1963: Margnat–Paloma
- 1964–1965: Fagor
- 1966–1968: Ferrys

Luis Otaño Arcelus (born 26 January 1934 in Errenteria, Gipuzkoa) is a former Spanish Basque professional road bicycle racer. In 1964, Otaño lost the 1964 Vuelta a España to Raymond Poulidor by only 33 seconds.

== Major results ==
1958

1st GP Liberacion de Ondarroa
5th Overall Vuelta a España

1960
1st Stage 4 Stage 4 Critérium du Dauphiné Libéré
1st Stages 1a & 1b 3 jours d'Anvers Driedaagse van Antwerpen
3rd Paris–Tours
6th Overall Menton–Roma

1961
1st Stage 10 Vuelta a España
1st Stage 4 Circuit d'Aquitaine
2nd Ronde des Korrigans
3rd Overall GP de la Bicicleta Eibarresa

1962
1st Road Race, National Road Championships
2nd Prueba Villafranca de Ordizia
3rd Tour de Haute-Loire
3rd Saint-Gaudens
2nd GP du Parisien

1963
1st Stage 3a Volta a Catalunya
1st Stage 5 Circuit du Provençal
1st Stage 1 GP du Midi-Libre
2nd Saint-Gaudens
2nd GP du Parisien

1964
1st GP Pascuas
2nd Overall Vuelta a España

1st Stage 9

2nd Prueba Villafranca de Ordizia
3rd Road Race, National Road Championships
3rd Subida al Naranco

1965
1st Stage 6 Critérium du Dauphiné Libéré
2nd Overall GP de la Bicicleta Eibarresa

1st Stage 2

2nd Hill Climb, National Road Championships
2nd Trofeo Jaumandreu
2nd Klasika Primavera
7th Overall Setmana Catalana de Ciclismo
8th Barcelona–Andorra

1966
1st Road Race, National Road Championships
1st Stage 15 Tour de France
1st Stage 10a Vuelta a España
1st GP Virgen Blanca
1st Vailly-sur-Sauldre
1st Stage 6 Vuelta a Ávila
1st Stage 1b Vuelta a Levante
6th Overall Gran Premio Fedrácion Catalana de Ciclismo
10th Overall Vuelta a Mallorca
