= Televizier (cycling team) =

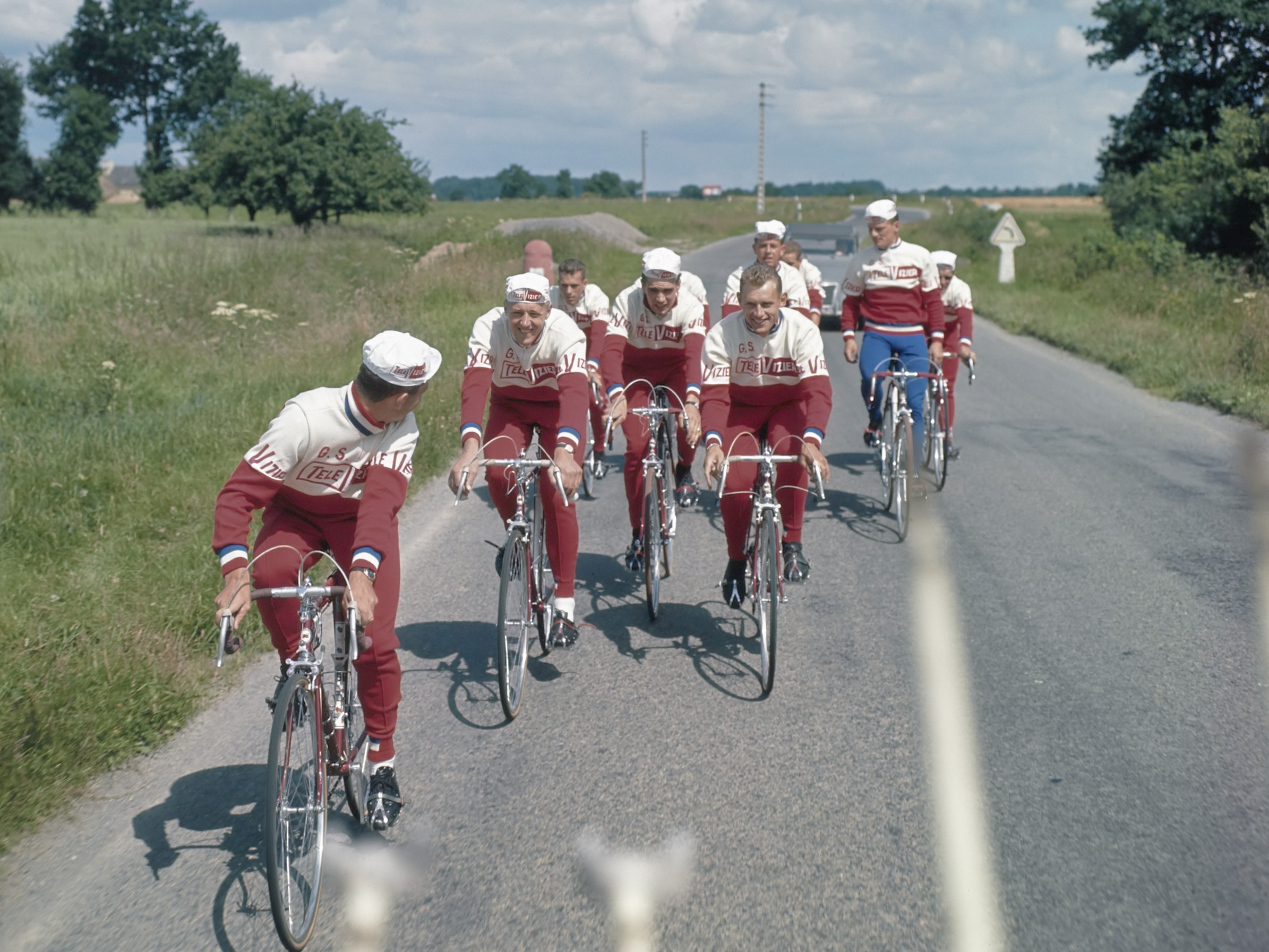
- The Televizier team in 1964

Team information
- Registered: Netherlands
- Founded: 1961
- Disbanded: 1967
- Discipline: Road

Key personnel
- Team managers: Klaas Buchly; Kees Pellenaars

Team name history
- 1961 1964–1965 1966–1967: Televizier; Televizier; Televizier–Batavus

Televizier was a Dutch professional cycling team that existed in part from 1961 to 1967. It was sponsored by Dutch television listings magazine Televizier.

== Rosters ==
=== 1961 ===
| Rider | Date of birth |
|---|---|
| Gerrit Lentelink (NED) | 17 March 1932 |
| Theo Sijthoff (NED) | 6 February 1937 |
| Mik Snijder (NED) | 6 February 1931 |
| Joop Van de Putten (NED) | 22 September 1935 |
| Ab van Egmond (NED) | 25 August 1938 |
| Wim van Est (NED) | 25 March 1923 |
