= José Antonio Momeñe =

Spanish cyclist

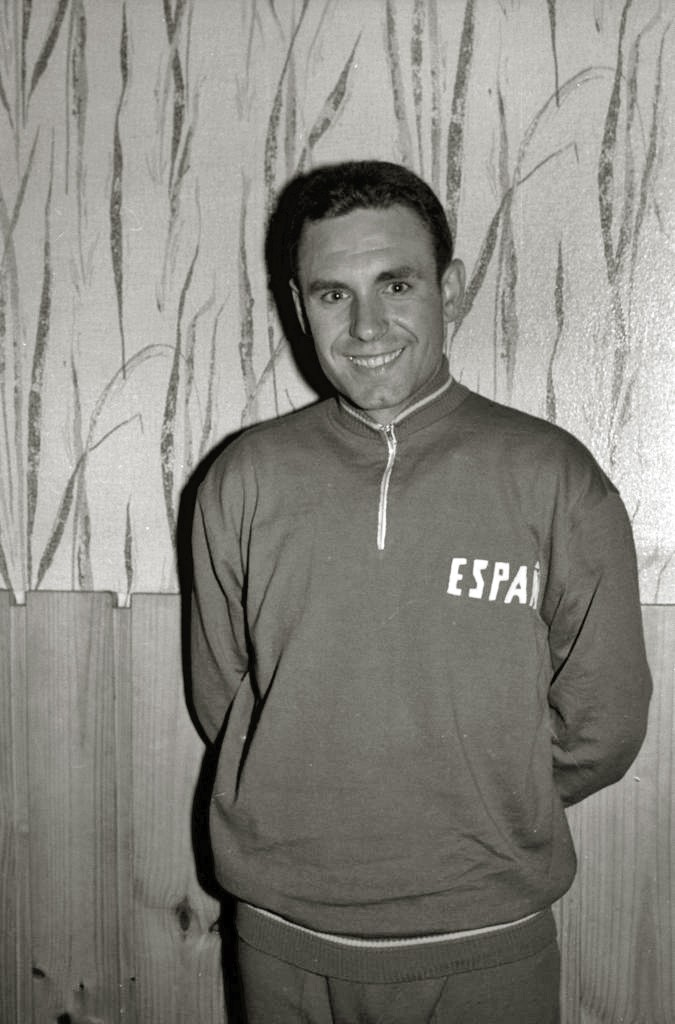

Personal information
- Full name: José Antonio Momeñe Campo
- Born: 15 August 1940 Zierbena, Spain
- Died: 23 December 2010 (aged 70) Barakaldo, Spain

Cycling career
- Sport: Cycling
- Discipline: Road
- Role: Rider

José Antonio Momeñe Campo (15 August 1940 – 23 December 2010) was a Spanish professional road bicycle racer, who finished 4th place in the general classification of the 1966 Tour de France. He was born in Zierbena. He competed in the individual road race and team time trial events at the 1960 Summer Olympics.

== Palmarès ==
1962
Vuelta a Andalucía
1963
Clásica a los Puertos de Guadarrama
1964
Clásica a los Puertos de Guadarrama
1966
Tour de France:

4th place overall classification

Vuelta a España:

Winner stage 3

1967
Gran Premio de Llodio
GP Pascuas
1968
Trofeo Elola
