= Cees Haast =

Dutch cyclist (1938–2019)

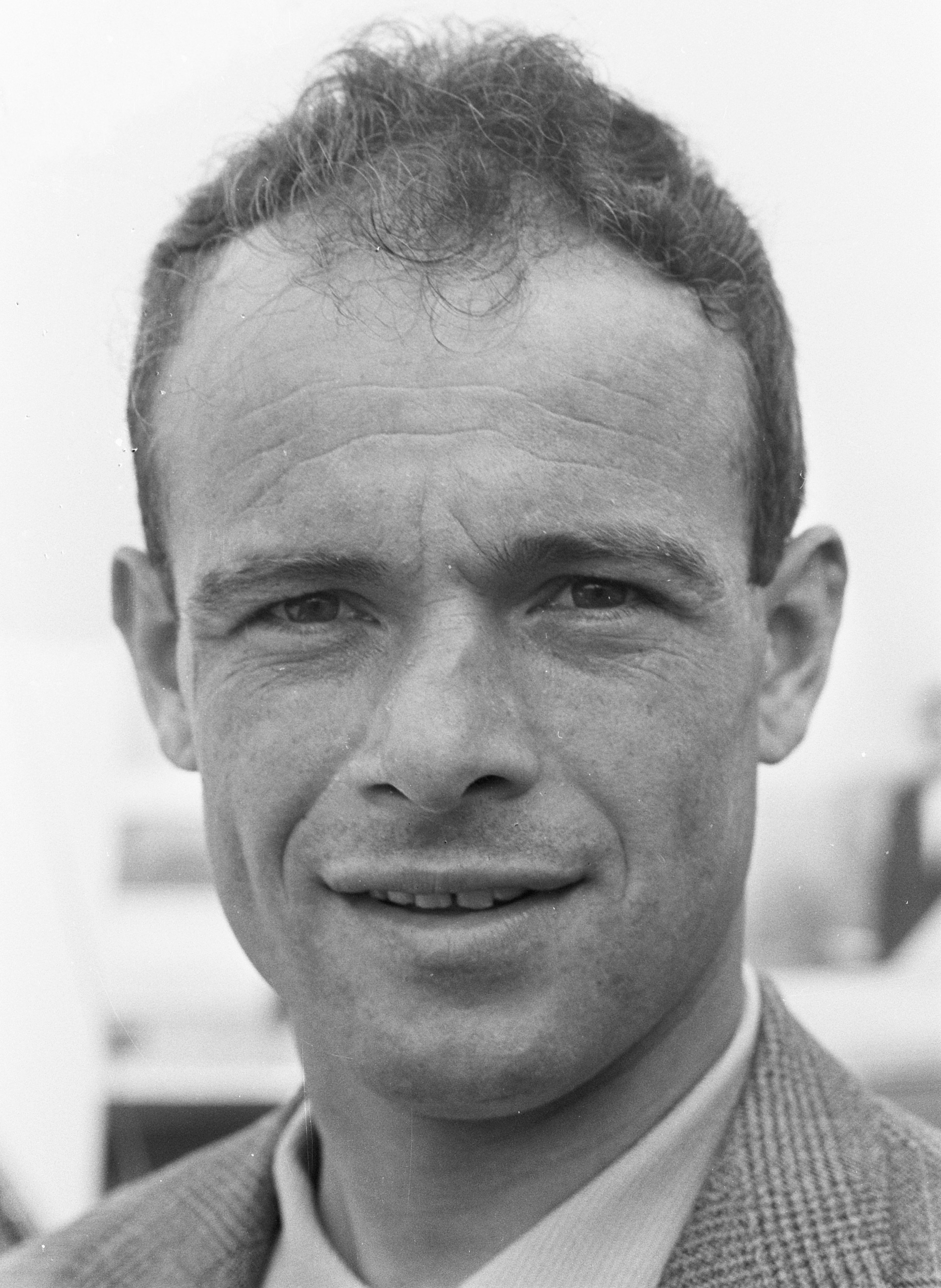
- Haast in 1967

Personal information
- Born: 19 November 1938 Rijsbergen, Netherlands
- Died: 18 January 2019 (aged 80) Rucphen, Netherlands

Cycling career
- Sport: Cycling

Professional teams
- 1964-1967: Télévizier
- 1968: Bic
- 1969: Willem II

Cees Haast (19 November 1938 – 18 January 2019) was a Dutch cyclist. His sporting career began with Fortuna Zundert.

== Major results ==
1962

2nd of Ronde van Limburg
2nd of Delta Profronde

1964

2nd of the Dutch National Road Race Championships

1966

7th and 13th stages of the Vuelta a España
2nd of the Dutch National Road Race Championships
8th of Vuelta a España

1967

5th of the Vuelta a España

1968

3rd stage of Tour of Luxembourg
2nd of the Tour of Luxembourg

== Results on the major tours ==
=== Tour de France ===
- 1964: 39th
- 1965: DNF
- 1966: 36th
- 1967: 14th
- 1969: 63rd

=== Vuelta a España ===
- 1966: 8th, winner of the 7th and 13th stages
- 1967: 5th
- 1968: 20th
- 1969: 32nd

=== Giro d'Italia ===
- 1968 Giro d'Italia: 22nd
