= Antonio Gómez del Moral =

Spanish cyclist (1939–2021)

Personal information
- Born: 15 November 1939 Cabra, Spain
- Died: 14 July 2021 (aged 81) Seville, Spain

Cycling career
- Sport: Cycling
- Discipline: Road
- Role: Rider

Professional teams
- 1959: Málaga
- 1960: Licor 43
- 1961–1963: Faema
- 1963: Flandria–Faema
- 1964: Ignis
- 1965–1971: Kas–Kaskol
- 1972: Karpy–Licor

Major wins
- Grand Tours Giro d'Italia 1 individual stage (1967) Vuelta a España 3 individual stages (1960, 1962, 1966) Stage races Volta a Catalunya (1965) Tour de l'Avenir (1962) Vuelta a Andalucía (1969) One-day races and Classics National Road Race Championships (1965) Gran Premio Navarra (1967, 1970) Circuito de Getxo (1965)

Antonio Gómez del Moral (15 November 1939 – 14 July 2021) was a Spanish professional road racing cyclist.

== Major results ==
1960
1st Stage 5 Vuelta a España
1st Stages 1a & 2 Volta a Catalunya
1st Stages 3a & 4 Vuelta a Levante
3rd Overall Volta a Portugal

1st Stage 12

1961
1st Stage 1b Vuelta a Levante
2nd Overall Vuelta a Andalucía

1st Stage 2

2nd Gran Premio Navarra
2nd Trofeo Jaumendreu
5th Overall Vuelta a España
1962
1st Overall Tour de l'Avenir

1st Stage 10

1st Stage 9 Vuelta a España
9th Overall Critérium du Dauphiné Libéré
1963
1st Stage 8 Vuelta a España
9th Overall Critérium du Dauphiné Libéré
1964
1st Overall Vuelta a Levante
1st Stage 5 Volta a Portugal
1st Stage 7b Volta a Catalunya
2nd Trofeo Masferrer
6th Overall Tour de Suisse
1965
1st Road race, National Road Championships
1st Overall Volta a Catalunya

1st Stage 6b

1st Circuito de Getxo
3rd Subida al Naranco
9th Overall Vuelta a España
1966
1st Overall Vuelta a La Rioja

1st Stage 3

1st Stage 9 Vuelta a España
1st Klasika Primavera
1st Circuito de Getxo
1st Trofeo Jaumendreu
1st Prueba Villafranca de Ordizia
3rd Overall Setmana Catalana de Ciclisme
7th Overall Vuelta a España
1967
1st National Hill Climb Championships (Gran Premio Navarra)
1st Klasika Primavera
1st Stage 2 Giro d'Italia
2nd Overall Volta a Catalunya

1st Stage 4

2nd GP Llodio
2nd GP Vizcaya
1968
2nd Road race, National Road Championships
7th Overall Vuelta a España
1969
1st Overall Vuelta a Andalucía

1st Stage 6

1st Stage 2b Vuelta a los Valles Mineros
2nd Trofeo Masferrer
2nd Klasika Primavera
1970
1st Gran Premio Navarra
2nd GP Llodio
2nd GP Pascuas
1971
2nd Overall Vuelta a Asturias

1st Prologue

3rd Overall Vuelta a Aragón
