= Henk Nijdam =

Dutch cyclist (1935–2009)

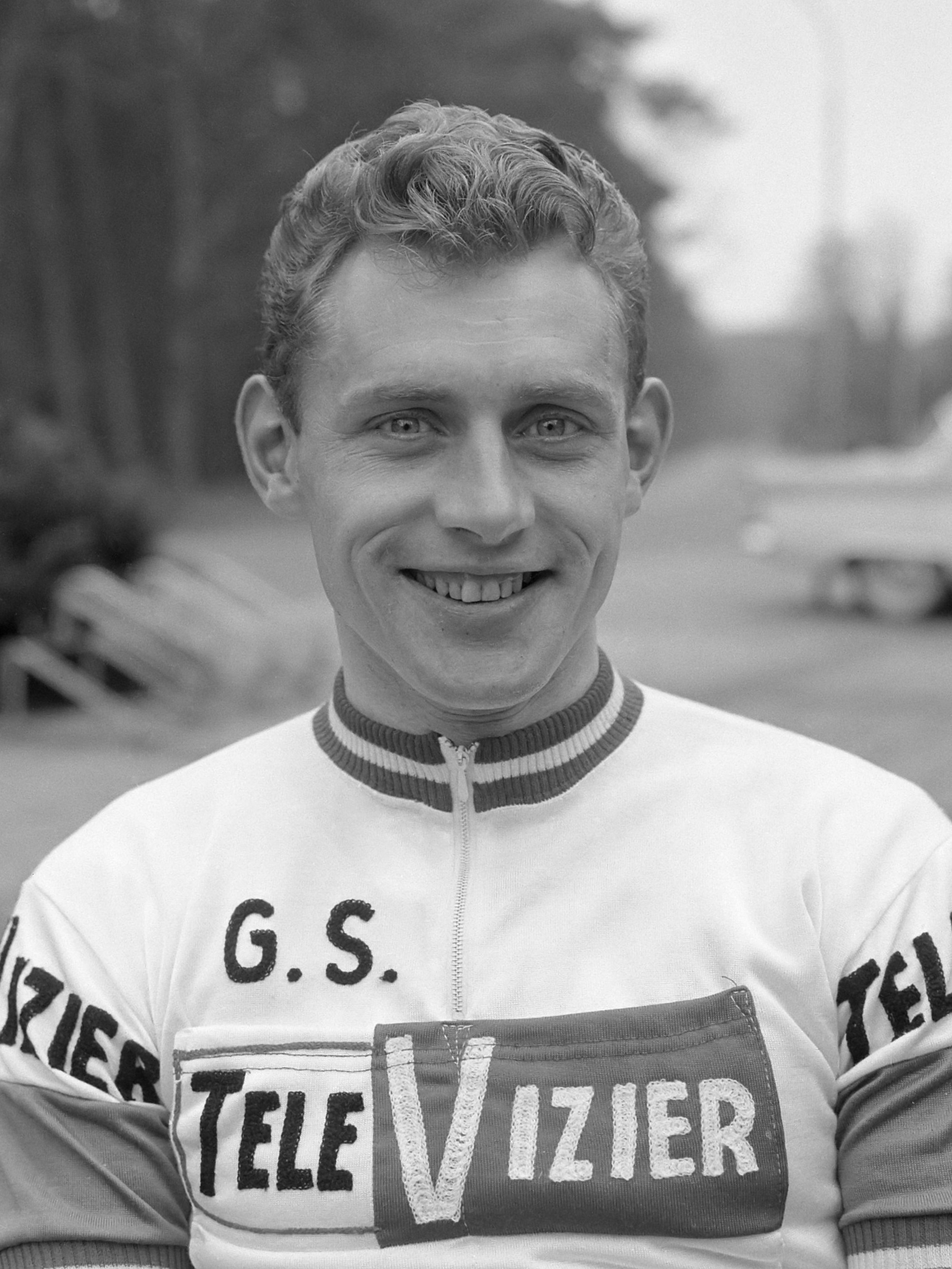
- Nijdam in 1964

Personal information
- Full name: Henk Nijdam
- Born: 26 August 1935 Haren (Groningen), the Netherlands
- Died: 30 April 2009 (aged 73) Breda, the Netherlands
- Height: 1.72 m (5 ft 8 in)
- Weight: 75 kg (165 lb)

Cycling career
- Sport: Cycling
- Discipline: Track/Road
- Role: Rider

Major wins
- World champion Track Pursuit (1962); 2 stages Tour de France
Medal record
Men's track cycling
Representing Netherlands
World Championships
| Gold medal – first place | 1962 Milan | Individual pursuit |
| Bronze medal – third place | 1963 Rocourt | Individual pursuit |

Henk Nijdam (26 August 1935 – 30 April 2009) was a Dutch road and track cyclist. His sporting career began with Fortuna Zundert. On track, he finished in fifth place in the 4 km team pursuit at the 1960 Summer Olympics. He also won a gold and a bronze medals in the individual pursuit at world championships in 1962 and 1963.

His best achievements on the road were winning the Olympia's Tour in 1964 and two stages of the Tour de France in 1964 and 1966.

Nijdam was the father of cyclist Jelle Nijdam.

== Major results ==
1960
Netherlands National Track Pursuit Championship
1961
Amateur World Track Pursuit Championship
Ronde van Midden-Nederland
1962
World Track Pursuit Championship
Olympia's Tour
1964
Tour de France:

Winner stage 6

Oirschot
Made
1965
Maarheeze
Mijl van Mares
Kwaadmechelen
1966
Eeklo
Netherlands National Track Pursuit Championship
Nationale Sluitingsprijs
Ulvenhout
Valkenswaard
Tour de France:

Winner stage 20

Vuelta a España:

Winner stages 8, 10B and 16

1967
Beervelde
Netherlands National Track Pursuit Championship
Vuelta a España:

Winner stage 12

1968
Essen
Kortenhoef
Rijkevorsel

== See also ==
- List of Dutch Olympic cyclists

Awards
| Preceded by Anton Geesink; Henk van der Grift | Dutch Sportsman of the Year; 1962 | Succeeded by Peter Post |
