= Eusebio Vélez =

Spanish cyclist (1935–2020)

Personal information
- Full name: Eusebio Vélez de Mendizabal
- Born: 28 March 1935 Durana, Spain
- Died: 16 June 2020 (aged 85) Vitoria-Gasteiz

Cycling career
- Sport: Cycling
- Discipline: Road
- Role: Rider

Professional teams
- 1960: Beasain-As
- 1961–1967: Kas–Royal Asport
- 1968–1969: Fagor–Fargas

Eusebio Vélez de Mendizabal (28 March 1935 – 16 June 2020) was a professional Spanish cyclist. He finished 2nd in the 1966 Vuelta a España and 3rd in the 1968 Vuelta a España. He also rode in four editions of the Tour de France, two editions of the Giro d'Italia and nine editions of the Vuelta a España.

== Major results ==
1961
3rd Subida al Naranco
1962
2nd Klasika Primavera
1963
1st Circuito Montañés
1st Klasika Primavera
1964
1st Klasika Primavera
1st Stage 1b Vuelta a España
2nd GP Miguel Induráin
1965
1st Stage 4 Euskal Bizikleta
1st GP Miguel Induráin
3rd Circuito de Getxo
1966
1st Overall GP Miguel Induráin
1st Subida a Urkiola
1968
1st Klasika Primavera
