= Carlos Echeverría (cyclist) =

Spanish cyclist

Carlos Echevarría
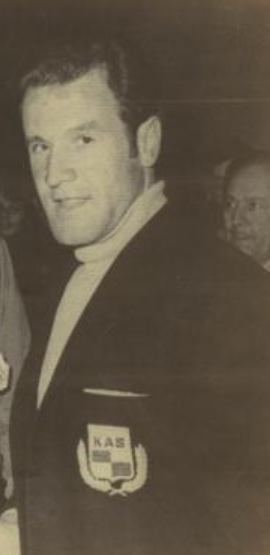
- Carlos Echevarría in 1970

Personal information
- Full name: Carlos Echevarría Zudaire
- Born: 4 November 1940 (age 86) Aramendía, Spain

Cycling career
- Sport: Cycling
- Current team: Retired
- Discipline: Road
- Role: Rider

Professional teams
- 1961–1962: Funcor–Munguia
- 1963–1971: Kas–Kaskol

Carlos Echevarría Zudaire (born 4 November 1940) is a former Spanish professional cyclist. He finished in the top 10 four times in the Vuelta a España, including third place in 1966. He also won two stages of the race, in 1965 and 1966.

== Major results ==
1962
1st Overall Vuelta a La Rioja
1963
1st Overall Vuelta a La Rioja

1st Stage 1

2nd Clásica a los Puertos de Guadarrama
3rd Campeonato Vasco Navarro de Montaña
7th Overall Vuelta a Andalucía
1964
1st Overall Gran Premio de la Bicicleta Eibarresa

1st Stage 5

2nd Overall Vuelta a La Rioja

1st Stage 3

3rd GP Pascuas
1965
1st GP Pascuas
1st GP San Lorenzo
2nd Prueba Villafranca de Ordizia
2nd Overall Volta a Catalunya
3rd Overall Vuelta a La Rioja

1st Stage 2

5th Overall Vuelta a España

1st Stage 4B

1966
1st Overall GP Leganes
1st Campeonato Vasco Navarro de Montaña
2nd Circuito de Getxo
2nd Overall Critérium du Dauphiné Libéré

1st Stage 5

2nd National Road Race Championships
3rd Overall Vuelta a España

1st Stage 5

1967
1st Overall Gran Premio de la Bicicleta Eibarresa
2nd GP Pascuas
2nd National Road Race Championships
1968
1st Overall GP Leganes
3rd Trofeo Elola
8th Overall Vuelta a España
1969
1st Trofeo Luis Puig
2nd GP Pascuas
9th Overall Vuelta a España
1970
1st Klasika Primavera
1st Overall Vuelta a la Rioja

1st Stage 1

1st Stage 4 Tour of the Basque Country
3rd GP Llodio
3rd Trofeo Luis Puig
