= Jos van der Vleuten =

Dutch cyclist

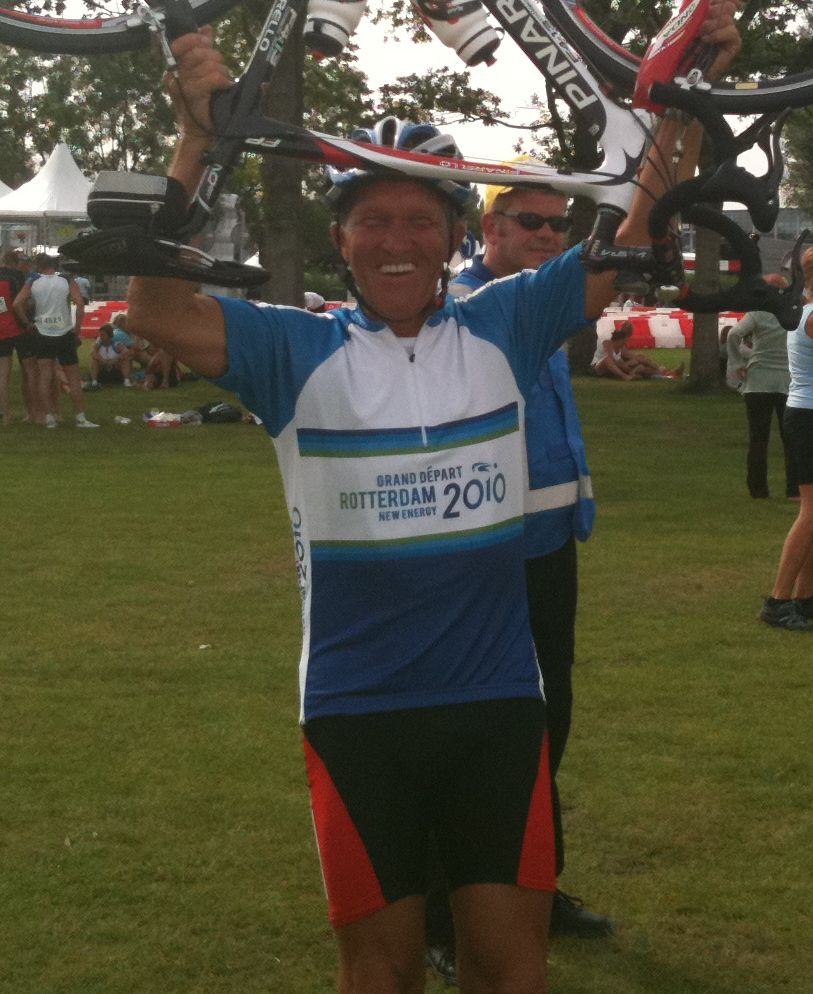
- Van der Vleuten in 1968

Personal information
- Full name: Jos van der Vleuten
- Born: 7 February 1943 Mierlo-Hout, the Netherlands
- Died: 5 December 2011 (aged 68) Dominican Republic

Cycling career
- Sport: Cycling
- Discipline: Road
- Role: Rider

Major wins
- points classification 1966 Vuelta a España

Jos van der Vleuten (7 February 1943 – 5 December 2011) was a Dutch professional road bicycle racer from 1965 to 1973.

Van der Vleuten was not a team leader, but usually rode his races helping his teammates, mainly Jan Janssen. The major result in his career was winning the points classification in the Vuelta a España in 1966, without winning any stage. He rode the race again in 1967, 1970 and 1972, each time winning one stage. Van de Vleuten also rode the Tour de France six times, never winning a stage.

After the 1967 UCI Road World Championships, where he finished in fifth place, Van der Vleuten tested positive for doping, and was disqualified.
