= José María Errandonea =

Spanish cyclist (born 1940)

Personal information
- Full name: José María Errandonea Urtizberea
- Born: 12 December 1940 (age 85) Irun, Gipuzkoa, Spain

Cycling career
- Sport: Cycling
- Discipline: Road
- Role: Rider

Major wins
- 4 stages Vuelta a España; 1 stage Tour de France

José María Errandonea Urtizberea (born 12 December 1940) is a Spanish former professional road bicycle racer. He won a stage in the 1967 Tour de France and wore the maillot jaune for one day. He also won a stage in the 1966 Vuelta a España as well as several stages and the 1968 overall of the Euskal Bizikleta. He also competed in the sprint and team pursuit events at the 1960 Summer Olympics.

== Major results ==
1940
Burgos
1966
Vuelta a España:

Winner stage 1B

1967
Vuelta a España:

Winner stage 1B (with Jan Janssen)

Tour de France:

Winner stage 1A (prologue)
Wearing yellow jersey for one day

1968
Vuelta a España:

Winner stage 9

1970
Vuelta a España:

Winner stage 18
