= Gregorio San Miguel =

Spanish cyclist

Personal information
- Full name: Gregorio San Miguel Angulo
- Born: December 2, 1940 (age 85) Valmaseda, Spain

Cycling career
- Sport: Cycling
- Current team: Retired
- Discipline: Road
- Role: Rider

Professional teams
- 1965: OLSA
- 1966–1971: Kas

Major wins
- Vuelta a España, 2 stages :King of the Mountains (1966)

Gregorio San Miguel Angulo (Valmaseda, December 2, 1940) is a former Spanish road racing cyclist.

== Major achievements ==
1966
Vuelta a España

1st, Stage 14
1st, Gran Premio de la Montaña

1967
1st, Stage 3, Volta a Catalunya
1968
1st, Bordeaux-Saintes
1st, Stage 4, Tour de Suisse
1st, Gran Premio de Villafranca
1st, Prix de Maurs
1st, Campeonato de España de Montaña
4th, Tour de France
1969
1st, Gran Premio Navarra
1st, Stage 17, Vuelta a España
