= Fagor (cycling team, 1966–1969) =

Spanish professional cycling team

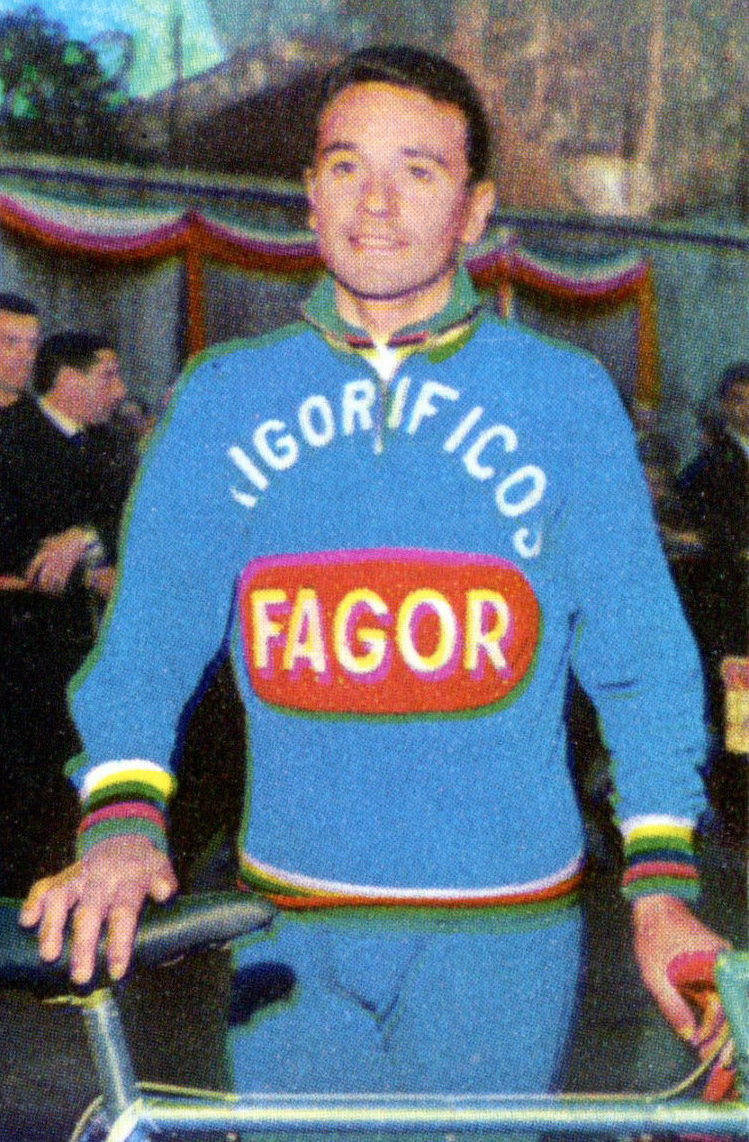
- Jaime Alomar in 1967

Team information
- Registered: Spain
- Founded: 1966
- Disbanded: 1969
- Discipline: Road

Key personnel
- General manager: Pedro Machain

Team name history
- 1966–1968 1968 1969: Fagor; Fagor–Fargas; Fagor

Fagor was a Spanish professional cycling team that existed from 1966 to 1969. Its main sponsor was Spanish domestic and commercial appliance manufacturer Fagor.
