= List of teams and cyclists in the 1961 Tour de France =

List of cyclists

Since Jacques Anquetil had won in 1957, he was unable to repeat it, due to illness, tiredness and struggle within the French team. For the 1961 Tour de France, he asked the team captain Marcel Bidot to make a team that would only ride for him, and Bidot agreed. Anquetil announced before the race that he would take the yellow jersey as leader of the general classification on the first day, and wear it until the end of the race in Paris. Gastone Nencini, who won the previous edition, did not enter in 1961, but Graziano Battistini, his teammate and runner-up of 1960, started the race as leader of the Italian team. If the French team would again have internal struggles, the Italian team could emerge as the winner. The Spanish team had two outsiders, José Pérez Francés and Fernando Manzaneque. The last outsider was Charly Gaul, winner of the 1958 Tour de France, who rode in the mixed Luxembourg-Swiss team. He considered his teammates so weak that he did not seek their help, and rode the race on his own. Raymond Poulidor was convinced by his team manager Antonin Magne that it would be better to skip the Tour, because the national team format would undermine his commercial value.

== Start list ==
=== By team ===
Italy
No.	Rider	Pos.
1	Renzo Accordi (ITA)	43
2	Graziano Battistini (ITA)	DNF
3	Guido Boni (ITA)	DNF
4	Carlo Brugnami (ITA)	DNF
5	Guido Carlesi (ITA)	2
6	Roberto Falaschi (ITA)	50
7	Vito Favero (ITA)	DNF
8	Imerio Massignan (ITA)	4
9	Mario Minieri (ITA)	44
10	Armando Pellegrini (ITA)	56
11	Ezio Pizzoglio (ITA)	DNF
12	Adriano Zamboni (ITA)	16

France
No.	Rider	Pos.
13	Henry Anglade (FRA)	18
14	Jacques Anquetil (FRA)	1
15	Robert Cazala (FRA)	40
16	André Darrigade (FRA)	32
17	Pierre Everaert (FRA)	68
18	Jean Forestier (FRA)	35
19	René Privat (FRA)	DNF
20	Joseph Groussard (FRA)	45
21	François Mahé (FRA)	DNF
22	Raymond Mastrotto (FRA)	19
23	Louis Rostollan (FRA)	31
24	Jean Stablinski (FRA)	42

Belgium
No.	Rider	Pos.
25	Jan Adriaensens (BEL)	10
26	Frans Aerenhouts (BEL)	17
27	Jean-Baptiste Claes (BEL)	36
28	Emile Daems (BEL)	DNF
29	Jos Hoevenaers (BEL)	11
30	Eddy Pauwels (BEL)	9
31	Jef Planckaert (BEL)	15
32	Louis Proost (BEL)	DNF
33	Michel Van Aerde (BEL)	13
34	René Vanderveken (BEL)	DNF
35	Martin Van Geneugden (BEL)	61
36	Jozef Vloeberghs (BEL)	DNF

Spain
No.	Rider	Pos.
37	Jaime Alomar (ESP)	DNF
38	Antonio Bertrán (ESP)	DNF
39	Juan Campillo (ESP)	55
40	José Gómez del Moral (ESP)	DNF
41	Vicente Iturat (ESP)	69
42	Fernando Manzaneque (ESP)	6
43	René Marigil (ESP)	62
44	Carmelo Morales Erostarbe (ESP)	DNF
45	Luis Otaño (ESP)	38
46	Miguel Pacheco (ESP)	DNF
47	José Pérez Francés (ESP)	7
48	Julio San Emeterio (ESP)	49

Netherlands
No.	Rider	Pos.
49	Piet Damen (NED)	51
50	Jo de Haan (NED)	DNF
51	Dick Enthoven (NED)	DNF
52	Albertus Geldermans (NED)	DNF
53	Jaap Kersten (NED)	58
54	Jef Lahaye (NED)	DNF
55	Coen Niesten (NED)	DNF
56	Piet van Est (NED)	DNF
57	Wim van Est (NED)	DNF
58	Antoon van der Steen (NED)	64
59	Wout Wagtmans (NED)	DNF
60	Jan Westdorp (NED)	66

Germany
No.	Rider	Pos.
61	Josef Borghard (FRG)	DNF
62	Manfred Donike (FRG)	DNF
63	Friedhelm Fischerkemmer (FRG)	DNF
64	Hans Jaroscewicz (FRG)	DNF
65	Hans Junkermann (FRG)	5
66	Dieter Kemper (FRG)	DNF
67	Helmut Kuckelkorn (FRG)	DNF
68	Horst Oldenburg (FRG)	DNF
69	Reinhold Pommer (FRG)	DNF
70	Dieter Puschel (FRG)	54
71	Siegfried Renz (FRG)	DNF
72	Ludwig Troche (FRG)	DNF

Switzerland/Luxembourg
No.	Rider	Pos.
73	Fritz Gallati (SUI)	63
74	Kurt Gimmi (SUI)	DNF
75	Rolf Graf (SUI)	60
76	Jean Luisier (SUI)	DNF
77	Serge Ruchet (SUI)	67
78	Alfred Rüegg (SUI)	12
79	Raymond Bley (LUX)	DNF
80	Aldo Bolzan (LUX)	33
81	Marcel Ernzer (LUX)	37
82	Charly Gaul (LUX)	3
83	Jean-Pierre Sintges (LUX)	DNF
84	Roger Thull (LUX)	DNF

Great Britain
No.	Rider	Pos.
85	Stan Brittain (GBR)	DNF
86	Ron Coe (GBR)	DNF
87	Vin Denson (GBR)	DNF
88	Seamus Elliott (IRL)	47
89	Albert Hitchen (GBR)	DNF
90	Ken Laidlaw (GBR)	65
91	Ian Moore (IRL)	DNF
92	George O'Brien (GBR)	DNF
93	Peter Ryall (GBR)	DNF
94	Sean Ryan (GBR)	DNF
95	Brian Robinson (GBR)	53
96	Tom Simpson (GBR)	DNF

France - Paris/North-East
No.	Rider	Pos.
101	Albert Bouvet (FRA)	DNF
102	Henri Duez (FRA)	DNF
103	Philippe Gaudrillet (FRA)	DNF
104	André Geneste (FRA)	72
105	Elio Gerussi (FRA)	26
106	Raymond Hoorelbeke (FRA)	70
107	Stéphane Lach (FRA)	29
108	André Le Dissez (FRA)	DNF
109	Jean-Claude Lefebvre (FRA)	71
110	Jean-Claude Sauvage (FRA)	DNF
111	Bernard Viot (FRA)	57
112	Joseph Wasko (FRA)	24

France - Centre
No.	Rider	Pos.
113	Antoine Abate (FRA)	52
114	Louis Bergaud (FRA)	46
115	Emmanuel Busto (FRA)	48
116	Jean Dotto (FRA)	8
117	Valentin Huot (FRA)	39
118	Camille Le Menn (FRA)	DNF
119	Claude Mattio (FRA)	22
120	Jean Milesi (FRA)	34
121	Anatole Novak (FRA)	DNF
122	Marcel Rohrbach (FRA)	DNF
123	Pierre Ruby (FRA)	DNF
124	Gérard Thiélin (FRA)	41

France - West/South-West
No.	Rider	Pos.
125	Pierre Beuffeuil (FRA)	28
126	Edouard Bihouée (FRA)	23
127	André Cloarec (FRA)	DNF
128	André Foucher (FRA)	20
129	Jean Gainche (FRA)	14
130	Georges Groussard (FRA)	30
131	Marc Huiart (FRA)	DNF
132	Guy Ignolin (FRA)	59
133	Félix Lebuhotel (FRA)	DNF
134	Fernand Picot (FRA)	27
135	Marcel Queheille (FRA)	21
136	Joseph Thomin (FRA)	25

=== By rider ===
Legend
No.	Starting number worn by the rider during the Tour
Pos.	Position in the general classification
DNF	Denotes a rider who did not finish

No.	Name	Nationality	Team	Pos.	Ref
1	Renzo Accordi	Italy	Italy	43	
2	Graziano Battistini	Italy	Italy	DNF	
3	Guido Boni	Italy	Italy	DNF	
4	Carlo Brugnami	Italy	Italy	DNF	
5	Guido Carlesi	Italy	Italy	2	
6	Roberto Falaschi	Italy	Italy	50	
7	Vito Favero	Italy	Italy	DNF	
8	Imerio Massignan	Italy	Italy	4	
9	Mario Minieri	Italy	Italy	44	
10	Armando Pellegrini	Italy	Italy	56	
11	Ezio Pizzoglio	Italy	Italy	DNF	
12	Adriano Zamboni	Italy	Italy	16	
13	Henry Anglade	France	France	18	
14	Jacques Anquetil	France	France	1	
15	Robert Cazala	France	France	40	
16	André Darrigade	France	France	32	
17	Pierre Everaert	France	France	68	
18	Jean Forestier	France	France	35	
19	René Privat	France	France	DNF	
20	Joseph Groussard	France	France	45	
21	François Mahé	France	France	DNF	
22	Raymond Mastrotto	France	France	19	
23	Louis Rostollan	France	France	31	
24	Jean Stablinski	France	France	42	
25	Jan Adriaensens	Belgium	Belgium	10	
26	Frans Aerenhouts	Belgium	Belgium	17	
27	Jean-Baptiste Claes	Belgium	Belgium	36	
28	Emile Daems	Belgium	Belgium	DNF	
29	Jos Hoevenaers	Belgium	Belgium	11	
30	Eddy Pauwels	Belgium	Belgium	9	
31	Jef Planckaert	Belgium	Belgium	15	
32	Louis Proost	Belgium	Belgium	DNF	
33	Michel Van Aerde	Belgium	Belgium	13	
34	René Vanderveken	Belgium	Belgium	DNF	
35	Martin Van Geneugden	Belgium	Belgium	61	
36	Joseph Vloeberghs	Belgium	Belgium	DNF	
37	Jaime Alomar	Spain	Spain	DNF	
38	Antonio Bertrán	Spain	Spain	DNF	
39	Juan Campillo	Spain	Spain	55	
40	José Gómez del Moral	Spain	Spain	DNF	
41	Vicente Iturat	Spain	Spain	69	
42	Fernando Manzaneque	Spain	Spain	6	
43	René Marigil	Spain	Spain	62	
44	Carmelo Morales Erostarbe	Spain	Spain	DNF	
45	Luis Otaño	Spain	Spain	38	
46	Miguel Pacheco	Spain	Spain	DNF	
47	José Pérez Francés	Spain	Spain	7	
48	Julio San Emeterio	Spain	Spain	49	
49	Piet Damen	Netherlands	Netherlands	51	
50	Jo de Haan	Netherlands	Netherlands	DNF	
51	Dick Enthoven	Netherlands	Netherlands	DNF	
52	Albertus Geldermans	Netherlands	Netherlands	DNF	
53	Jaap Kersten	Netherlands	Netherlands	58	
54	Jef Lahaye	Netherlands	Netherlands	DNF	
55	Coen Niesten	Netherlands	Netherlands	DNF	
56	Piet van Est	Netherlands	Netherlands	DNF	
57	Wim van Est	Netherlands	Netherlands	DNF	
58	Antoon van der Steen	Netherlands	Netherlands	64	
59	Wout Wagtmans	Netherlands	Netherlands	DNF	
60	Jan Westdorp	Netherlands	Netherlands	66	
61	Josef Borghard	West Germany	Germany	DNF	
62	Manfred Donike	West Germany	Germany	DNF	
63	Friedhelm Fischerkeller	West Germany	Germany	DNF	
64	Hans Jaroscewicz	West Germany	Germany	DNF	
65	Hans Junkermann	West Germany	Germany	5	
66	Dieter Kemper	West Germany	Germany	DNF	
67	Helmut Kuckelkorn	West Germany	Germany	DNF	
68	Horst Oldenburg	West Germany	Germany	DNF	
69	Reinhold Pommer	West Germany	Germany	DNF	
70	Dieter Puschel	West Germany	Germany	54	
71	Siegfried Renz	West Germany	Germany	DNF	
72	Ludwig Troche	West Germany	Germany	DNF	
73	Fritz Gallati	Switzerland	Switzerland/Luxembourg	63	
74	Kurt Gimmi	Switzerland	Switzerland/Luxembourg	DNF	
75	Rolf Graf	Switzerland	Switzerland/Luxembourg	60	
76	Jean Luisier	Switzerland	Switzerland/Luxembourg	DNF	
77	Serge Ruchet	Switzerland	Switzerland/Luxembourg	67	
78	Alfred Rüegg	Switzerland	Switzerland/Luxembourg	12	
79	Raymond Bley	Luxembourg	Switzerland/Luxembourg	DNF	
80	Aldo Bolzan	Luxembourg	Switzerland/Luxembourg	33	
81	Marcel Ernzer	Luxembourg	Switzerland/Luxembourg	37	
82	Charly Gaul	Luxembourg	Switzerland/Luxembourg	3	
83	Jean-Pierre Sintges	Luxembourg	Switzerland/Luxembourg	DNF	
84	Roger Thull	Luxembourg	Switzerland/Luxembourg	DNF	
85	Stan Brittain	Great Britain	Great Britain	DNF	
86	Ron Coe	Great Britain	Great Britain	DNF	
87	Vin Denson	Great Britain	Great Britain	DNF	
88	Seamus Elliott	Ireland	Great Britain	47	
89	Albert Hitchen	Great Britain	Great Britain	DNF	
90	Ken Laidlaw	Great Britain	Great Britain	65	
91	Ian Moore	Ireland	Great Britain	DNF	
92	George O'Brien	Great Britain	Great Britain	DNF	
93	Peter Ryalls	Great Britain	Great Britain	DNF	
94	Sean Ryan	Great Britain	Great Britain	DNF	
95	Brian Robinson	Great Britain	Great Britain	53	
96	Tom Simpson	Great Britain	Great Britain	DNF	
101	Albert Bouvet	France	France - Paris/North-East	DNF	
102	Henri Duez	France	France - Paris/North-East	DNF	
103	Philippe Gaudrillet	France	France - Paris/North-East	DNF	
104	André Geneste	France	France - Paris/North-East	72	
105	Elio Gerussi	France	France - Paris/North-East	26	
106	Raymond Hoorelbeke	France	France - Paris/North-East	70	
107	Stéphane Lach	France	France - Paris/North-East	29	
108	André Le Dissez	France	France - Paris/North-East	DNF	
109	Jean-Claude Lefebvre	France	France - Paris/North-East	71	
110	Claude Sauvage	France	France - Paris/North-East	DNF	
111	Bernard Viot	France	France - Paris/North-East	57	
112	Joseph Wasko	France	France - Paris/North-East	24	
113	Antoine Abate	France	France - Centre	52	
114	Louis Bergaud	France	France - Centre	46	
115	Emmanuel Busto	France	France - Centre	48	
116	Jean Dotto	France	France - Centre	8	
117	Valentin Huot	France	France - Centre	39	
118	Camille Le Menn	France	France - Centre	DNF	
119	Claude Mattio	France	France - Centre	22	
120	Jean Milesi	France	France - Centre	34	
121	Anatole Novak	France	France - Centre	DNF	
122	Marcel Rohrbach	France	France - Centre	DNF	
123	Pierre Ruby	France	France - Centre	DNF	
124	Gérard Thiélin	France	France - Centre	41	
125	Pierre Beuffeuil	France	France - West/South-West	28	
126	Edouard Bihouée	France	France - West/South-West	23	
127	André Cloarec	France	France - West/South-West	DNF	
128	André Foucher	France	France - West/South-West	20	
129	Jean Gainche	France	France - West/South-West	14	
130	Georges Groussard	France	France - West/South-West	30	
131	Marc Huiart	France	France - West/South-West	DNF	
132	Guy Ignolin	France	France - West/South-West	59	
133	Félix Lebuhotel	France	France - West/South-West	DNF	
134	Fernand Picot	France	France - West/South-West	27	
135	Marcel Queheille	France	France - West/South-West	21	
136	Joseph Thomin	France	France - West/South-West	25	
