= 1965 Vuelta a España, Stage 1 to Stage 9 =

Cycling race stages

The 1965 Vuelta a España was the 20th edition of the Vuelta a España, one of cycling's Grand Tours. The Vuelta began in Vigo on 29 April, and Stage 9 occurred on 7 May with a stage to Salou. The race finished in Bilbao on 15 May.

== Stage 1 ==
29 April 1965 - Vigo to Vigo, 168 km (104.4 mi)

Route:

Stage 1 result and general classification after Stage 1

Rank	Rider	Team	Time
1	Rik Van Looy (BEL)	Solo–Superia	4h 19' 16"
2	Antonio Barrutia (ESP)	Kas–Kaskol	+ 28"
3	Rudi Altig (FRG)	Margnat–Paloma–Inuri–Dunlop	+ 1' 00"
4	Michel Grain (FRA)	Ford France–Gitane	s.t.
5	Antonio Bertrán (ESP)	Ferrys	s.t.
6	André Le Dissez (FRA)	Mercier–BP–Hutchinson	s.t.
7	José Luis Talamillo (ESP)	Olsa	s.t.
8	Paul Lemeteyer (FRA)	Ford France–Gitane	s.t.
9	Frans Verbeeck (BEL)	Wiel's–Groene Leeuw	s.t.
10	Barry Hoban (GBR)	Mercier–BP–Hutchinson	s.t.

== Stage 2 ==
30 April 1965 - Pontevedra to Lugo, 150 km (93.2 mi)

Route:

Stage 2 result

Rank	Rider	Team	Time
1	Rik Van Looy (BEL)	Solo–Superia	4h 20' 02"
2	Frans Melckenbeeck (BEL)	Mercier–BP–Hutchinson	+ 30"
3	José Luis Talamillo (ESP)	Olsa	+ 1' 00"
4	Edward Sels (BEL)	Solo–Superia	s.t.
5	José Ramon Goyeneche (ESP)	Olsa	s.t.
6	Rudi Altig (FRG)	Margnat–Paloma–Inuri–Dunlop	s.t.
7	Frans Verbeeck (BEL)	Wiel's–Groene Leeuw	s.t.
8	Jaime Alomar (ESP)	Ferrys	s.t.
9	Victor Van Schil (BEL)	Mercier–BP–Hutchinson	s.t.
10	Carlos Echeverría (ESP)	Kas–Kaskol	s.t

General classification after Stage 2

Rank	Rider	Team	Time
1	Rik Van Looy (BEL)	Solo–Superia	8h 39' 18"
2	Antonio Barrutia (ESP)	Kas–Kaskol	+ 1' 29"
3	Rudi Altig (FRG)	Margnat–Paloma–Inuri–Dunlop	+ 1' 58"
4	José Luis Talamillo (ESP)	Olsa	s.t.
5	Michel Grain (FRA)	Ford France–Gitane	s.t.
6	Frans Verbeeck (BEL)	Wiel's–Groene Leeuw	s.t.
7	Victor Van Schil (BEL)	Mercier–BP–Hutchinson	s.t.
8	Carlos Echeverría (ESP)	Kas–Kaskol	s.t.
9	Eusebio Vélez (ESP)	Kas–Kaskol	s.t.
10	Karl-Heinz Kunde (FRG)	Wiel's–Groene Leeuw	s.t.

== Stage 3 ==
1 May 1965 - Lugo to Gijón, 247 km (153 mi)

Route:

Stage 3 result

Rank	Rider	Team	Time
1	Rudi Altig (FRG)	Margnat–Paloma–Inuri–Dunlop	7h 17' 33"
2	José Luis Talamillo (ESP)	Olsa	+ 30"
3	Frans Verbeeck (BEL)	Wiel's–Groene Leeuw	+ 1' 00"
4	Antonio Gómez del Moral (ESP)	Kas–Kaskol	s.t.
5	Jean-Claude Wuillemin (FRA)	Ford France–Gitane	s.t.
6	August Verhaegen (BEL)	Wiel's–Groene Leeuw	s.t.
7	Willi Altig (FRG)	Margnat–Paloma–Inuri–Dunlop	s.t.
8	Michel Grain (FRA)	Ford France–Gitane	s.t.
9	José Ramon Goyeneche (ESP)	Olsa	s.t.
10	Antonio Bertrán (ESP)	Ferrys	s.t

General classification after Stage 3

Rank	Rider	Team	Time
1	Rik Van Looy (BEL)	Solo–Superia	15h 57' 51"
2	Rudi Altig (FRG)	Margnat–Paloma–Inuri–Dunlop	+ 1' 00"
3	Antonio Barrutia (ESP)	Kas–Kaskol	+ 1' 29"
4	José Luis Talamillo (ESP)	Olsa	+ 1' 30"
5	Frans Verbeeck (BEL)	Wiel's–Groene Leeuw	+ 2' 00"
6	Michel Grain (FRA)	Ford France–Gitane	s.t.
7	Victor Van Schil (BEL)	Mercier–BP–Hutchinson	s.t.
8	Carlos Echeverría (ESP)	Kas–Kaskol	s.t.
9	Luis Otaño (ESP)	Ferrys	s.t.
10	Robert Cazala (FRA)	Mercier–BP–Hutchinson	s.t.

== Stage 4a ==
2 May 1965 - Mieres to Pajares, 41 km (25 mi) (ITT)

Route:

Stage 4a result

Rank	Rider	Team	Time
1	Raymond Poulidor (FRA)	Mercier–BP–Hutchinson	1h 17' 08"
2	Francisco Gabica (ESP)	Kas–Kaskol	+ 3' 07"
3	Eusebio Vélez (ESP)	Kas–Kaskol	+ 4' 09"
4	Valentín Uriona (ESP)	Kas–Kaskol	+ 5' 01"
5	Federico Bahamontes (ESP)	Margnat–Paloma–Inuri–Dunlop	+ 5' 02"
6	Carlos Echeverría (ESP)	Kas–Kaskol	+ 5' 38"
7	Georges Chappe (FRA)	Mercier–BP–Hutchinson	+ 5' 54"
8	Joaquim Galera (ESP)	Kas–Kaskol	+ 6' 07"
9	Rudi Altig (FRG)	Margnat–Paloma–Inuri–Dunlop	+ 6' 43"
10	Julio Jiménez (ESP)	Kas–Kaskol	+ 7' 04"

== Stage 4b ==
2 May 1965 - Pajares to Palencia, 189 km (117 mi)

Route:

Stage 4b result

Rank	Rider	Team	Time
1	Carlos Echeverría (ESP)	Kas–Kaskol	4h 03' 01"
2	Frans Verbeeck (BEL)	Wiel's–Groene Leeuw	+ 15"
3	Rolf Wolfshohl (FRG)	Mercier–BP–Hutchinson	+ 30"
4	Roger Baguet (BEL)	Solo–Superia	s.t.
5	Hans Junkermann (FRG)	Margnat–Paloma–Inuri–Dunlop	s.t.
6	Jef Planckaert (BEL)	Solo–Superia	s.t.
7	André Le Dissez (FRA)	Mercier–BP–Hutchinson	s.t.
8	Karl-Heinz Kunde (FRG)	Wiel's–Groene Leeuw	s.t.
9	Michel Van Aerde (BEL)	Solo–Superia	s.t.
10	Raymond Poulidor (FRA)	Mercier–BP–Hutchinson	s.t.

General classification after Stage 4b

Rank	Rider	Team	Time
1	Raymond Poulidor (FRA)	Mercier–BP–Hutchinson	21h 20' 30"
2	Carlos Echeverría (ESP)	Kas–Kaskol	+ 5' 08"
3	Rudi Altig (FRG)	Margnat–Paloma–Inuri–Dunlop	+ 6' 03"
4	Rik Van Looy (BEL)	Solo–Superia	+ 6' 35"
5	Karl-Heinz Kunde (FRG)	Wiel's–Groene Leeuw	+ 7' 13"
6	Hans Junkermann (FRG)	Margnat–Paloma–Inuri–Dunlop	+ 9' 29"
7	Rolf Wolfshohl (FRG)	Mercier–BP–Hutchinson	+ 9' 50"
8	Francisco Gabica (ESP)	Kas–Kaskol	+ 9' 57"
9	Jef Planckaert (BEL)	Solo–Superia	+ 10' 29"
10	Federico Bahamontes (ESP)	Margnat–Paloma–Inuri–Dunlop	+ 11' 52"

== Stage 5 ==
3 May 1965 - Palencia to Madrid, 238 km (148 mi)

Route:

Stage 5 result

Rank	Rider	Team	Time
1	Fernando Manzaneque (ESP)	Ferrys	6h 08' 35"
2	Gérard Thiélin (FRA)	Ford France–Gitane	+ 30"
3	Georges Chappe (FRA)	Mercier–BP–Hutchinson	+ 4' 12"
4	Juan Sánchez Camero (ESP)	Tedi Montjuic	+ 14' 06"
5	Antonio Gómez del Moral (ESP)	Kas–Kaskol	+ 15' 26"
6	Antonio Barrutia (ESP)	Kas–Kaskol	+ 15' 32"
7	Michel Grain (FRA)	Ford France–Gitane	s.t.
8	Frans Verbeeck (BEL)	Wiel's–Groene Leeuw	s.t.
9	Hans Junkermann (FRG)	Margnat–Paloma–Inuri–Dunlop	s.t.
10	Rudi Altig (FRG)	Margnat–Paloma–Inuri–Dunlop	s.t.

== Stage 6 ==
4 May 1965 - Madrid to Cuenca, 161 km (100 mi)

Route:

Stage 6 result

Rank	Rider	Team	Time
1	Manuel Martín Piñera (ESP)	Kas–Kaskol	3h 48' 09"
2	Joaquim Galera (ESP)	Kas–Kaskol	+ 2' 20"
3	José Pérez Francés (ESP)	Ferrys	+ 2' 51"
4	Jozef Timmerman (BEL)	Wiel's–Groene Leeuw	s.t.
5	Rik Van Looy (BEL)	Solo–Superia	s.t.
6	Karl-Heinz Kunde (FRG)	Wiel's–Groene Leeuw	s.t.
7	Lucien Aimar (FRA)	Ford France–Gitane	s.t.
8	Guy Ignolin (FRA)	Ford France–Gitane	+ 4' 46"
9	Frans Verbeeck (BEL)	Wiel's–Groene Leeuw	+ 4' 48"
10	Michel Grain (FRA)	Ford France–Gitane	s.t.

General classification after Stage 6

Rank	Rider	Team	Time
1	Raymond Poulidor (FRA)	Mercier–BP–Hutchinson	31h 37' 34"
2	Gérard Thiélin (FRA)	Ford France–Gitane	+ 54"
3	Fernando Manzaneque (ESP)	Ferrys	+ 4' 28"
4	Rik Van Looy (BEL)	Solo–Superia	+ 4' 40"
5	Carlos Echeverría (ESP)	Kas–Kaskol	+ 5' 08"
6	Karl-Heinz Kunde (FRG)	Wiel's–Groene Leeuw	+ 5' 18"
7	Hans Junkermann (FRG)	Margnat–Paloma–Inuri–Dunlop	+ 9' 29"
8	Rolf Wolfshohl (FRG)	Mercier–BP–Hutchinson	+ 9' 50"
9	Francisco Gabica (ESP)	Kas–Kaskol	+ 9' 57"
10	Federico Bahamontes (ESP)	Margnat–Paloma–Inuri–Dunlop	+ 11' 52"

== Stage 7 ==
5 May 1965 - Albacete to Benidorm, 212 km (132 mi)

Route:

Stage 7 result

Rank	Rider	Team	Time
1	Rik Van Looy (BEL)	Solo–Superia	4h 59' 29"
2	Edward Sels (BEL)	Solo–Superia	+ 30"
3	Paul Lemeteyer (FRA)	Ford France–Gitane	+ 1' 00"
4	Frans Verbeeck (BEL)	Wiel's–Groene Leeuw	s.t.
5	Raymond Poulidor (FRA)	Mercier–BP–Hutchinson	s.t.
6	Robert Cazala (FRA)	Mercier–BP–Hutchinson	s.t.
7	Barry Hoban (GBR)	Mercier–BP–Hutchinson	s.t.
8	André Le Dissez (FRA)	Mercier–BP–Hutchinson	s.t.
9	Jozef Spruyt (BEL)	Mercier–BP–Hutchinson	s.t.
10	Victor Van Schil (BEL)	Mercier–BP–Hutchinson	s.t.

General classification after Stage 7

Rank	Rider	Team	Time
1	Raymond Poulidor (FRA)	Mercier–BP–Hutchinson	36h 38' 03"
2	Gérard Thiélin (FRA)	Ford France–Gitane	+ 54"
3	Rik Van Looy (BEL)	Solo–Superia	+ 3' 40"
4	Fernando Manzaneque (ESP)	Ferrys	+ 4' 28"
5	Carlos Echeverría (ESP)	Kas–Kaskol	+ 5' 08"
6	Karl-Heinz Kunde (FRG)	Wiel's–Groene Leeuw	+ 5' 08"
7	Hans Junkermann (FRG)	Margnat–Paloma–Inuri–Dunlop	+ 9' 29"
8	Rolf Wolfshohl (FRG)	Mercier–BP–Hutchinson	+ 9' 50"
9	Francisco Gabica (ESP)	Kas–Kaskol	+ 9' 57"
10	Michel Van Aerde (BEL)	Solo–Superia	+ 11' 54"

== Stage 8 ==
6 May 1965 - Benidorm to Sagunto, 174 km (108 mi)

Route:

Stage 8 result

Rank	Rider	Team	Time
1	Jean-Claude Wuillemin (FRA)	Ford France–Gitane	3h 56' 38"
2	Michel Van Aerde (BEL)	Solo–Superia	+ 30"
3	Rolf Wolfshohl (FRG)	Mercier–BP–Hutchinson	+ 1' 00"
4	Ginés García (ESP)	Margnat–Paloma–Inuri–Dunlop	s.t.
5	Robert Poulot (FRA)	Mercier–BP–Hutchinson	+ 1' 02"
6	Armand Desmet (BEL)	Solo–Superia	+ 1' 04"
7	Gregorio San Miguel (ESP)	Olsa	+ 7' 53"
8	Sebastián Elorza (ESP)	Kas–Kaskol	+ 7' 54"
9	August Verhaegen (BEL)	Wiel's–Groene Leeuw	+ 7' 55"
10	Eddy Pauwels (BEL)	Wiel's–Groene Leeuw	+ 8' 06"

General classification after Stage 8

Rank	Rider	Team	Time
1	Rolf Wolfshohl (FRG)	Mercier–BP–Hutchinson	40h 45' 31"
2	Michel Van Aerde (BEL)	Solo–Superia	+ 1' 34"
3	Raymond Poulidor (FRA)	Mercier–BP–Hutchinson	+ 3' 50"
4	Gérard Thiélin (FRA)	Ford France–Gitane	+ 4' 44"
5	Rik Van Looy (BEL)	Solo–Superia	+ 7' 30"
6	Fernando Manzaneque (ESP)	Ferrys	+ 8' 18"
7	Carlos Echeverría (ESP)	Kas–Kaskol	+ 8' 58"
8	Karl-Heinz Kunde (FRG)	Wiel's–Groene Leeuw	+ 9' 08"
9	Jean-Claude Wuillemin (FRA)	Ford France–Gitane	+ 12' 10"
10	Hans Junkermann (FRG)	Margnat–Paloma–Inuri–Dunlop	+ 13' 09"

== Stage 9 ==
7 May 1965 - Sagunto to Salou, 237 km (147 mi)

Route:

Stage 9 result

Rank	Rider	Team	Time
1	Rik Van Looy (BEL)	Solo–Superia	5h 46' 23"
2	Frans Verbeeck (BEL)	Wiel's–Groene Leeuw	+ 30"
3	Michel Grain (FRA)	Ford France–Gitane	+ 1' 00"
4	Jaime Alomar (ESP)	Ferrys	s.t.
5	Jean-Claude Wuillemin (FRA)	Ford France–Gitane	s.t.
6	Carlos Echeverría (ESP)	Kas–Kaskol	s.t.
7	José Segú (ESP)	Tedi Montjuic	s.t.
8	Robert Cazala (FRA)	Mercier–BP–Hutchinson	s.t.
9	Antonio Suárez (ESP)	Tedi Montjuic	s.t.
10	August Verhaegen (BEL)	Wiel's–Groene Leeuw	s.t.

General classification after Stage 9

Rank	Rider	Team	Time
1	Rolf Wolfshohl (FRG)	Mercier–BP–Hutchinson	46h 32' 54"
2	Raymond Poulidor (FRA)	Mercier–BP–Hutchinson	+ 3' 50"
3	Gérard Thiélin (FRA)	Ford France–Gitane	+ 4' 44"
4	Rik Van Looy (BEL)	Solo–Superia	+ 6' 30"
5	Fernando Manzaneque (ESP)	Ferrys	+ 8' 18"
6	Carlos Echeverría (ESP)	Kas–Kaskol	+ 8' 58"
7	Karl-Heinz Kunde (FRG)	Wiel's–Groene Leeuw	+ 9' 06"
8	Jean-Claude Wuillemin (FRA)	Ford France–Gitane	+ 12' 08"
9	Hans Junkermann (FRG)	Margnat–Paloma–Inuri–Dunlop	+ 13' 19"
10	Francisco Gabica (ESP)	Kas–Kaskol	+ 14' 23"
