= 1965 Vuelta a España, Stage 10a to Stage 18 =

Cycling race stages

The 1965 Vuelta a España was the 20th edition of the Vuelta a España, one of cycling's Grand Tours. The Vuelta began in Vigo on 29 April, and Stage 10a occurred on 8 May with a stage from Salou. The race finished in Bilbao on 15 May.

== Stage 10a ==
8 May 1965 - Salou to Barcelona, 115 km (71.5 mi)

Route:

Stage 10a result

Rank	Rider	Team	Time
1	Frans Melckenbeeck (BEL)	Mercier–BP–Hutchinson	2h 59' 52"
2	Rik Van Looy (BEL)	Solo–Superia	+ 15"
3	Paul Lemeteyer (FRA)	Ford France–Gitane	+ 30"
4	Michel Grain (FRA)	Ford France–Gitane	s.t.
5	Frans Verbeeck (BEL)	Wiel's–Groene Leeuw	s.t.
6	Jaime Alomar (ESP)	Ferrys	s.t.
7	Antonio Bertrán (ESP)	Ferrys	s.t.
8	Lucien Aimar (FRA)	Ford France–Gitane	s.t.
9	August Verhaegen (BEL)	Wiel's–Groene Leeuw	s.t.
10	Victor Van Schil (BEL)	Mercier–BP–Hutchinson	s.t.

== Stage 10b ==
8 May 1965 - Barcelona to Barcelona, 50 km (31.1 mi)

Stage 10b result

Rank	Rider	Team	Time
1	Julio Jiménez (ESP)	Kas–Kaskol	1h 12' 13"
2	Rolf Wolfshohl (FRG)	Mercier–BP–Hutchinson	+ 21"
3	Robert Cazala (FRA)	Mercier–BP–Hutchinson	+ 2' 54"
4	Antonio Gómez del Moral (ESP)	Kas–Kaskol	s.t.
5	Gregorio San Miguel (ESP)	Olsa	s.t.
6	Jozef Spruyt (BEL)	Mercier–BP–Hutchinson	s.t.
7	Hans Junkermann (FRG)	Margnat–Paloma–Inuri–Dunlop	s.t.
8	Fernando Manzaneque (ESP)	Ferrys	s.t.
9	Lucien Aimar (FRA)	Ford France–Gitane	+ 3' 09"
10	José Segú (ESP)	Tedi Montjuic	s.t.

General classification after Stage 10b

Rank	Rider	Team	Time
1	Rolf Wolfshohl (FRG)	Mercier–BP–Hutchinson	50h 45' 50"
2	Raymond Poulidor (FRA)	Mercier–BP–Hutchinson	+ 6' 58"
3	Gérard Thiélin (FRA)	Ford France–Gitane	+ 7' 52"
4	Rik Van Looy (BEL)	Solo–Superia	+ 9' 23"
5	Fernando Manzaneque (ESP)	Ferrys	+ 10' 51"
6	Carlos Echeverría (ESP)	Kas–Kaskol	+ 12' 06"
7	Karl-Heinz Kunde (FRG)	Wiel's–Groene Leeuw	+ 12' 16"
8	Jean-Claude Wuillemin (FRA)	Ford France–Gitane	+ 15' 18"
9	Hans Junkermann (FRG)	Margnat–Paloma–Inuri–Dunlop	+ 15' 52"
10	Francisco Gabica (ESP)	Kas–Kaskol	+ 17' 31"

== Stage 11 ==
9 May 1965 - Barcelona to Andorra, 241 km (149.8 mi)

Route:

Stage 11 result

Rank	Rider	Team	Time
1	Esteban Martín (ESP)	Kas–Kaskol	7h 31' 06"
2	Antonio Gómez del Moral (ESP)	Kas–Kaskol	+ 3' 46"
3	Lucien Aimar (FRA)	Ford France–Gitane	+ 4' 16"
4	Joaquim Galera (ESP)	Kas–Kaskol	+ 6' 00"
5	José Segú (ESP)	Tedi Montjuic	+ 6' 17"
6	Frans Verbeeck (BEL)	Wiel's–Groene Leeuw	s.t.
7	Carlos Echeverría (ESP)	Kas–Kaskol	s.t.
8	Rik Van Looy (BEL)	Solo–Superia	s.t.
9	Hans Junkermann (FRG)	Margnat–Paloma–Inuri–Dunlop	s.t.
10	Raymond Poulidor (FRA)	Mercier–BP–Hutchinson	s.t.

General classification after Stage 11

Rank	Rider	Team	Time
1	Rolf Wolfshohl (FRG)	Mercier–BP–Hutchinson	58h 23' 13"
2	Raymond Poulidor (FRA)	Mercier–BP–Hutchinson	+ 6' 58"
3	Gérard Thiélin (FRA)	Ford France–Gitane	+ 7' 52"
4	Rik Van Looy (BEL)	Solo–Superia	+ 9' 23"
5	Fernando Manzaneque (ESP)	Ferrys	+ 10' 51"
6	Carlos Echeverría (ESP)	Kas–Kaskol	+ 12' 06"
7	Karl-Heinz Kunde (FRG)	Wiel's–Groene Leeuw	+ 12' 57"
8	Jean-Claude Wuillemin (FRA)	Ford France–Gitane	+ 15' 18"
9	Hans Junkermann (FRG)	Margnat–Paloma–Inuri–Dunlop	+ 15' 52"
10	Francisco Gabica (ESP)	Kas–Kaskol	+ 17' 31"

== Stage 12 ==
10 May 1965 - Andorra to Lleida, 158 km (98.2 mi)

Route:

Stage 12 result

Rank	Rider	Team	Time
1	Rik Van Looy (BEL)	Solo–Superia	4h 01' 56"
2	Michel Grain (FRA)	Ford France–Gitane	+ 30"
3	Robert Cazala (FRA)	Mercier–BP–Hutchinson	+ 1' 00"
4	Victor Van Schil (BEL)	Mercier–BP–Hutchinson	s.t.
5	Antonio Bertrán (ESP)	Ferrys	s.t.
6	Antonio Gómez del Moral (ESP)	Kas–Kaskol	s.t.
7	Alfons Hellemans (BEL)	Wiel's–Groene Leeuw	s.t.
8	Henri De Wolf (BEL)	Solo–Superia	s.t.
9	Carlos Echeverría (ESP)	Kas–Kaskol	s.t.
10	Francisco Gabica (ESP)	Kas–Kaskol	s.t.

== Stage 13 ==
11 May 1965 - Lleida to Zaragoza, 190 km (120 mi)

Route:

Stage 13 result

Rank	Rider	Team	Time
1	José Martín Colmenarejo (ESP)	Margnat–Paloma–Inuri–Dunlop	5h 06' 33"
2	Fernando Manzaneque (ESP)	Ferrys	+ 30"
3	Dieter Puschel (FRG)	Wiel's–Groene Leeuw	+ 6' 06"
4	Frans Verbeeck (BEL)	Wiel's–Groene Leeuw	+ 6' 14"
5	Robert Cazala (FRA)	Mercier–BP–Hutchinson	+ 6' 15"
6	Antonio Gómez del Moral (ESP)	Kas–Kaskol	s.t.
7	Michel Grain (FRA)	Ford France–Gitane	s.t.
8	Rik Van Looy (BEL)	Solo–Superia	s.t.
9	Hans Junkermann (FRG)	Margnat–Paloma–Inuri–Dunlop	s.t.
10	Paul Lemeteyer (FRA)	Ford France–Gitane	s.t.

General classification after Stage 13

Rank	Rider	Team	Time
1	Rolf Wolfshohl (FRG)	Mercier–BP–Hutchinson	67h 38' 57"
2	Raymond Poulidor (FRA)	Mercier–BP–Hutchinson	+ 7' 39"
3	Gérard Thiélin (FRA)	Ford France–Gitane	+ 8' 35"
4	Rik Van Looy (BEL)	Solo–Superia	+ 8' 53"
5	Fernando Manzaneque (ESP)	Ferrys	+ 10' 51"
6	Carlos Echeverría (ESP)	Kas–Kaskol	+ 12' 06"
7	Karl-Heinz Kunde (FRG)	Wiel's–Groene Leeuw	+ 13' 38"
8	Hans Junkermann (FRG)	Margnat–Paloma–Inuri–Dunlop	+ 15' 52"
9	Jean-Claude Wuillemin (FRA)	Ford France–Gitane	+ 15' 59"
10	Francisco Gabica (ESP)	Kas–Kaskol	+ 17' 31"

== Stage 14 ==
12 May 1965 - Zaragoza to Pamplona, 193 km (120 mi)

Route:

Stage 14 result

Rank	Rider	Team	Time
1	Rik Van Looy (BEL)	Solo–Superia	5h 59' 07"
2	Frans Melckenbeeck (BEL)	Mercier–BP–Hutchinson	+ 30"
3	Michel Grain (FRA)	Ford France–Gitane	+ 1' 00"
4	Paul Lemeteyer (FRA)	Ford France–Gitane	s.t.
5	Luis Otaño (ESP)	Ferrys	s.t.
6	Jaime Alomar (ESP)	Ferrys	s.t.
7	Antonio Gómez del Moral (ESP)	Kas–Kaskol	s.t.
8	José Segú (ESP)	Tedi Montjuic	s.t.
9	Frans Verbeeck (BEL)	Wiel's–Groene Leeuw	s.t.
10	August Verhaegen (BEL)	Wiel's–Groene Leeuw	s.t.

General classification after Stage 14

Rank	Rider	Team	Time
1	Rolf Wolfshohl (FRG)	Mercier–BP–Hutchinson	73h 39' 04"
2	Raymond Poulidor (FRA)	Mercier–BP–Hutchinson	+ 7' 39"
3	Rik Van Looy (BEL)	Solo–Superia	+ 7' 53"
4	Gérard Thiélin (FRA)	Ford France–Gitane	+ 8' 35"
5	Fernando Manzaneque (ESP)	Ferrys	+ 10' 51"
6	Carlos Echeverría (ESP)	Kas–Kaskol	+ 12' 06"
7	Karl-Heinz Kunde (FRG)	Wiel's–Groene Leeuw	+ 13' 38"
8	Hans Junkermann (FRG)	Margnat–Paloma–Inuri–Dunlop	+ 15' 52"
9	Jean-Claude Wuillemin (FRA)	Ford France–Gitane	+ 15' 59"
10	Francisco Gabica (ESP)	Kas–Kaskol	+ 17' 31"

== Stage 15 ==
13 May 1965 - Pamplona to Bayonne, 149 km (93 mi)

Route:

Stage 15 result

Rank	Rider	Team	Time
1	Rik Van Looy (BEL)	Solo–Superia	3h 47' 09"
2	Michel Grain (FRA)	Ford France–Gitane	+ 30"
3	Paul Lemeteyer (FRA)	Ford France–Gitane	+ 1' 00"
4	Frans Verbeeck (BEL)	Wiel's–Groene Leeuw	s.t.
5	Barry Hoban (GBR)	Mercier–BP–Hutchinson	s.t.
6	Victor Van Schil (BEL)	Mercier–BP–Hutchinson	s.t.
7	Jozef Spruyt (BEL)	Mercier–BP–Hutchinson	s.t.
8	Antonio Bertrán (ESP)	Ferrys	s.t.
9	Jaime Alomar (ESP)	Ferrys	s.t.
10	August Verhaegen (BEL)	Wiel's–Groene Leeuw	s.t.

General classification after Stage 15

Rank	Rider	Team	Time
1	Rolf Wolfshohl (FRG)	Mercier–BP–Hutchinson	77h 27' 13"
2	Rik Van Looy (BEL)	Solo–Superia	+ 6' 53"
3	Raymond Poulidor (FRA)	Mercier–BP–Hutchinson	+ 7' 39"
4	Gérard Thiélin (FRA)	Ford France–Gitane	+ 8' 35"
5	Fernando Manzaneque (ESP)	Ferrys	+ 10' 51"
6	Carlos Echeverría (ESP)	Kas–Kaskol	+ 12' 06"
7	Karl-Heinz Kunde (FRG)	Wiel's–Groene Leeuw	+ 13' 38"
8	Hans Junkermann (FRG)	Margnat–Paloma–Inuri–Dunlop	+ 15' 52"
9	Jean-Claude Wuillemin (FRA)	Ford France–Gitane	+ 15' 59"
10	Francisco Gabica (ESP)	Kas–Kaskol	+ 17' 31"

== Stage 16 ==
14 May 1965 - Saint-Pée-sur-Nivelle to San Sebastián, 61 km (38 mi) (ITT)

Route:

Stage 16 result

Rank	Rider	Team	Time
1	Raymond Poulidor (FRA)	Mercier–BP–Hutchinson	1h 35' 22"
2	Rolf Wolfshohl (FRG)	Mercier–BP–Hutchinson	+ 1' 03"
3	Fernando Manzaneque (ESP)	Ferrys	+ 3' 00"
4	Francisco Gabica (ESP)	Kas–Kaskol	+ 3' 35"
5	Rik Van Looy (BEL)	Solo–Superia	+ 4' 05"
6	Federico Bahamontes (ESP)	Margnat–Paloma–Inuri–Dunlop	+ 4' 34"
7	Carlos Echeverría (ESP)	Kas–Kaskol	+ 4' 51"
8	Hans Junkermann (FRG)	Margnat–Paloma–Inuri–Dunlop	+ 5' 24"
9	Lucien Aimar (FRA)	Ford France–Gitane	+ 5' 42"
10	Antonio Gómez del Moral (ESP)	Kas–Kaskol	+ 5' 57"

General classification after Stage 16

Rank	Rider	Team	Time
1	Rolf Wolfshohl (FRG)	Mercier–BP–Hutchinson	79h 03' 38"
2	Raymond Poulidor (FRA)	Mercier–BP–Hutchinson	+ 6' 36"
3	Rik Van Looy (BEL)	Solo–Superia	+ 9' 55"
4	Fernando Manzaneque (ESP)	Ferrys	+ 12' 48"
5	Carlos Echeverría (ESP)	Kas–Kaskol	+ 15' 54"
6	Francisco Gabica (ESP)	Kas–Kaskol	+ 20' 03"
7	Hans Junkermann (FRG)	Margnat–Paloma–Inuri–Dunlop	+ 20' 13"
8	Jean-Claude Wuillemin (FRA)	Ford France–Gitane	+ 22' 04"
9	Antonio Gómez del Moral (ESP)	Kas–Kaskol	+ 23' 04"
10	Federico Bahamontes (ESP)	Margnat–Paloma–Inuri–Dunlop	+ 23' 13"

== Stage 17 ==
15 May 1965 - San Sebastián to Vitoria, 214 km (133 mi)

Route:

Stage 17 result

Rank	Rider	Team	Time
1	Rik Van Looy (BEL)	Solo–Superia	6h 34' 18"
2	Jozef Spruyt (BEL)	Mercier–BP–Hutchinson	+ 30"
3	Jaime Alomar (ESP)	Ferrys	+ 1' 00"
4	Jean-Claude Wuillemin (FRA)	Ford France–Gitane	s.t.
5	Lucien Aimar (FRA)	Ford France–Gitane	s.t.
6	Antonio Suárez (ESP)	Tedi Montjuic	s.t.
7	Victor Van Schil (BEL)	Mercier–BP–Hutchinson	s.t.
8	José Segú (ESP)	Tedi Montjuic	s.t.
9	Rolf Wolfshohl (FRG)	Mercier–BP–Hutchinson	s.t.
10	Luis Otaño (ESP)	Ferrys	s.t.

General classification after Stage 17

Rank	Rider	Team	Time
1	Rolf Wolfshohl (FRG)	Mercier–BP–Hutchinson	85h 38' 56"
2	Raymond Poulidor (FRA)	Mercier–BP–Hutchinson	+ 6' 36"
3	Rik Van Looy (BEL)	Solo–Superia	+ 8' 55"
4	Fernando Manzaneque (ESP)	Ferrys	+ 12' 48"
5	Carlos Echeverría (ESP)	Kas–Kaskol	+ 15' 54"
6	Francisco Gabica (ESP)	Kas–Kaskol	+ 20' 03"
7	Hans Junkermann (FRG)	Margnat–Paloma–Inuri–Dunlop	+ 20' 13"
8	Jean-Claude Wuillemin (FRA)	Ford France–Gitane	+ 22' 04"
9	Antonio Gómez del Moral (ESP)	Kas–Kaskol	+ 23' 04"
10	Federico Bahamontes (ESP)	Margnat–Paloma–Inuri–Dunlop	+ 23' 13"

== Stage 18 ==
16 May 1965 - Vitoria to Bilbao, 222 km (138 mi)

Route:

Stage 18 result

Rank	Rider	Team	Time
1	Manuel Martín Piñera (ESP)	Kas–Kaskol	6h 46' 01"
2	José Bernárdez (ESP)	Ferrys	+ 3' 14"
3	Ventura Díaz (ESP)	Olsa	+ 8' 23"
4	Michel Grain (FRA)	Ford France–Gitane	+ 11' 00"
5	Jean-Claude Wuillemin (FRA)	Ford France–Gitane	s.t.
6	Carlos Echeverría (ESP)	Kas–Kaskol	s.t.
7	Jesús Isasi (ESP)	Olsa	s.t.
8	Jozef Spruyt (BEL)	Mercier–BP–Hutchinson	s.t.
9	Antonio Gómez del Moral (ESP)	Kas–Kaskol	s.t.
10	Lucien Aimar (FRA)	Ford France–Gitane	s.t.

General classification after Stage 18

Rank	Rider	Team	Time
1	Rolf Wolfshohl (FRG)	Mercier–BP–Hutchinson	92h 36' 03"
2	Raymond Poulidor (FRA)	Mercier–BP–Hutchinson	+ 6' 36"
3	Rik Van Looy (BEL)	Solo–Superia	+ 8' 55"
4	Fernando Manzaneque (ESP)	Ferrys	+ 12' 48"
5	Carlos Echeverría (ESP)	Kas–Kaskol	+ 15' 54"
6	Francisco Gabica (ESP)	Kas–Kaskol	+ 20' 03"
7	Hans Junkermann (FRG)	Margnat–Paloma–Inuri–Dunlop	+ 20' 13"
8	Jean-Claude Wuillemin (FRA)	Ford France–Gitane	+ 22' 04"
9	Antonio Gómez del Moral (ESP)	Kas–Kaskol	+ 23' 04"
10	Federico Bahamontes (ESP)	Margnat–Paloma–Inuri–Dunlop	+ 23' 13"
