= 1964 Vuelta a España, Stage 9 to Stage 17 =

Cycling race stages

The 1964 Vuelta a España was the 19th edition of the Vuelta a España, one of cycling's Grand Tours. The Vuelta began in Benidorm on 30 April, and Stage 9 occurred on 8 May with a stage from Pamplona. The race finished in Madrid on 16 May.

== Stage 9 ==
8 May 1964 - Pamplona to San Sebastián, 205 km (127.4 mi)

Route:

Stage 9 result

Rank	Rider	Team	Time
1	Luis Otaño (ESP)	Ferrys	5h 25' 19"
2	Antonio Barrutia (ESP)	Kas–Kaskol	+ 1' 00"
3	Antonio Bertrán (ESP)	Ferrys	+ 1' 30"
4	Fulgencio Sánchez (ESP)	Inuri	s.t.
5	Armand Desmet (BEL)	Solo–Superia	s.t.
6	Valentín Uriona (ESP)	Kas–Kaskol	s.t.
7	José Antonio Momeñe (ESP)	Kas–Kaskol	+ 3' 26"
8	Salvador Rosa Gómez (ESP)	Inuri	+ 4' 20"
9	Robert Cazala (FRA)	Mercier–BP–Hutchinson	s.t.
10	José Pérez Francés (ESP)	Ferrys	+ 6' 01"

General classification after Stage 9

Rank	Rider	Team	Time
1	Luis Otaño (ESP)	Ferrys	42h 18' 39"
2	José Pérez Francés (ESP)	Ferrys	+ 1' 32"
3	Eusebio Vélez (ESP)	Kas–Kaskol	+ 2' 18"
4	Raymond Poulidor (FRA)	Mercier–BP–Hutchinson	+ 2' 49"
5	Fernando Manzaneque (ESP)	Ferrys	+ 3' 23"
6	José Antonio Momeñe (ESP)	Kas–Kaskol	+ 4' 03"
7	Armand Desmet (BEL)	Solo–Superia	+ 6' 04"
8	Valentín Uriona (ESP)	Kas–Kaskol	+ 6' 19"
9	Francisco Gabica (ESP)	Kas–Kaskol	+ 9' 42"
10	Julio Jiménez (ESP)	Kas–Kaskol	+ 9' 45"

== Stage 10 ==
9 May 1964 - San Sebastián to Bilbao, 197 km (122.4 mi)

Route:

Stage 10 result

Rank	Rider	Team	Time
1	Henri De Wolf (BEL)	Solo–Superia	6h 01' 46"
2	Antonio Bertrán (ESP)	Ferrys	+ 2' 55"
3	Carlos Echeverria (ESP)	Kas–Kaskol	+ 3' 25"
4	Sebastián Elorza (ESP)	Kas–Kaskol	+ 3' 27"
5	Salvador Rosa Gómez (ESP)	Inuri	+ 6' 00"
6	Francisco Gabica (ESP)	Kas–Kaskol	+ 6' 02"
7	Louis Proost (BEL)	Solo–Superia	s.t.
8	José Antonio Momeñe (ESP)	Kas–Kaskol	s.t.
9	José Pérez Francés (ESP)	Ferrys	s.t.
10	Michel Van Aerde (BEL)	Solo–Superia	+ 6' 01"

General classification after Stage 10

Rank	Rider	Team	Time
1	Luis Otaño (ESP)	Ferrys	48h 26' 27"
2	José Pérez Francés (ESP)	Ferrys	+ 1' 32"
3	Eusebio Vélez (ESP)	Kas–Kaskol	+ 2' 18"
4	Raymond Poulidor (FRA)	Mercier–BP–Hutchinson	+ 2' 49"
5	Fernando Manzaneque (ESP)	Ferrys	+ 3' 23"
6	José Antonio Momeñe (ESP)	Kas–Kaskol	+ 4' 03"
7	Armand Desmet (BEL)	Solo–Superia	+ 6' 04"
8	Valentín Uriona (ESP)	Kas–Kaskol	+ 6' 19"
9	Antonio Bertrán (ESP)	Ferrys	+ 6' 58"
10	Sebastián Elorza (ESP)	Kas–Kaskol	+ 8' 11"

== Stage 11 ==
10 May 1964 - Bilbao to Vitoria, 107 km (66.5 mi)

Route:

Stage 11 result

Rank	Rider	Team	Time
1	Victor Van Schil (BEL)	Mercier–BP–Hutchinson	3h 03' 55"
2	Juan María Uribezubia (ESP)	Inuri	+ 30"
3	Julio Jiménez (ESP)	Kas–Kaskol	+ 52"
4	José Pérez Francés (ESP)	Ferrys	+ 1' 25"
5	Eusebio Vélez (ESP)	Kas–Kaskol	s.t.
6	Michel Van Aerde (BEL)	Solo–Superia	s.t.
7	André Le Dissez (FRA)	Mercier–BP–Hutchinson	s.t.
8	Raymond Poulidor (FRA)	Mercier–BP–Hutchinson	s.t.
9	Luis Otaño (ESP)	Ferrys	s.t.
10	Fernando Manzaneque (ESP)	Ferrys	s.t.

General classification after Stage 11

Rank	Rider	Team	Time
1	Luis Otaño (ESP)	Ferrys	51h 31' 47"
2	José Pérez Francés (ESP)	Ferrys	+ 1' 32"
3	Eusebio Vélez (ESP)	Kas–Kaskol	+ 2' 18"
4	Raymond Poulidor (FRA)	Mercier–BP–Hutchinson	+ 2' 49"
5	Fernando Manzaneque (ESP)	Ferrys	+ 3' 23"
6	José Antonio Momeñe (ESP)	Kas–Kaskol	+ 6' 15"
7	Valentín Uriona (ESP)	Kas–Kaskol	+ 6' 19"
8	Antonio Bertrán (ESP)	Ferrys	+ 6' 58"
9	Armand Desmet (BEL)	Solo–Superia	+ 8' 16"
10	Julio Jiménez (ESP)	Kas–Kaskol	+ 9' 22"

== Stage 12 ==
11 May 1964 - Vitoria to Santander, 211 km (131.1 mi)

Route:

Stage 12 result

Rank	Rider	Team	Time
1	Barry Hoban (GBR)	Mercier–BP–Hutchinson	6h 04' 49"
2	Henri De Wolf (BEL)	Solo–Superia	+ 30"
3	Julio Jiménez (ESP)	Kas–Kaskol	+ 1' 00"
4	Ventura Díaz (ESP)	Inuri	+ 1' 02"
5	Sebastián Elorza (ESP)	Kas–Kaskol	s.t.
6	Fernando Manzaneque (ESP)	Ferrys	s.t.
7	Louis Proost (BEL)	Solo–Superia	+ 1' 47"
8	José Pérez Francés (ESP)	Ferrys	+ 2' 19"
9	Arthur Decabooter (BEL)	Solo–Superia	s.t.
10	Robert Cazala (FRA)	Mercier–BP–Hutchinson	s.t.

== Stage 13 ==
12 May 1964 - Santander to Avilés, 230 km (140 mi)

Route:

Stage 13 result

Rank	Rider	Team	Time
1	Barry Hoban (GBR)	Mercier–BP–Hutchinson	6h 42' 58"
2	Antonio Bertrán (ESP)	Ferrys	+ 31"
3	Julio Sanz (ESP)	Inuri	+ 1' 01"
4	Victor Van Schil (BEL)	Mercier–BP–Hutchinson	+ 1' 03"
5	Francisco Gabica (ESP)	Kas–Kaskol	s.t.
6	Giovanni Garau (ITA)	Salvarani	+ 1' 19"
7	Frans Melckenbeeck (BEL)	Mercier–BP–Hutchinson	+ 1' 20"
8	Robert Cazala (FRA)	Mercier–BP–Hutchinson	+ 1' 24"
9	Jean-Pierre Genet (FRA)	Mercier–BP–Hutchinson	s.t.
10	Arthur Decabooter (BEL)	Solo–Superia	s.t.

General classification after Stage 13

Rank	Rider	Team	Time
1	Luis Otaño (ESP)	Ferrys	64h 23' 17"
2	José Pérez Francés (ESP)	Ferrys	+ 1' 32"
3	Fernando Manzaneque (ESP)	Ferrys	+ 2' 06"
4	Eusebio Vélez (ESP)	Kas–Kaskol	+ 2' 18"
5	Raymond Poulidor (FRA)	Mercier–BP–Hutchinson	+ 2' 49"
6	Antonio Bertrán (ESP)	Ferrys	+ 6' 06"
7	José Antonio Momeñe (ESP)	Kas–Kaskol	+ 6' 15"
8	Valentín Uriona (ESP)	Kas–Kaskol	+ 6' 19"
9	Julio Jiménez (ESP)	Kas–Kaskol	+ 8' 03"
10	Sebastián Elorza (ESP)	Kas–Kaskol	+ 9' 06"

== Stage 14 ==
13 May 1964 - Avilés to León, 163 km (101 mi)

Route:

Stage 14 result

Rank	Rider	Team	Time
1	Julio Jiménez (ESP)	Kas–Kaskol	4h 33' 33"
2	José Antonio Momeñe (ESP)	Kas–Kaskol	+ 7' 42"
3	Arthur Decabooter (BEL)	Solo–Superia	+ 8' 13"
4	Salvador Rosa Gómez (ESP)	Inuri	+ 8' 14"
5	Wim van Est (NED)	Holland	+ 8' 16"
6	Robert Cazala (FRA)	Mercier–BP–Hutchinson	+ 8' 17"
7	Carlos Echeverria (ESP)	Kas–Kaskol	+ 8' 20"
8	Victor Van Schil (BEL)	Mercier–BP–Hutchinson	+ 8' 27"
9	Frans Aerenhouts (BEL)	Mercier–BP–Hutchinson	+ 8' 31"
10	Michel Van Aerde (BEL)	Solo–Superia	s.t.

General classification after Stage 14

Rank	Rider	Team	Time
1	Julio Jiménez (ESP)	Kas–Kaskol	69h 04' 53"
2	Luis Otaño (ESP)	Ferrys	+ 28"
3	José Pérez Francés (ESP)	Ferrys	+ 2' 00"
4	Fernando Manzaneque (ESP)	Ferrys	+ 2' 34"
5	Eusebio Vélez (ESP)	Kas–Kaskol	+ 2' 46"
6	Raymond Poulidor (FRA)	Mercier–BP–Hutchinson	+ 3' 17"
7	José Antonio Momeñe (ESP)	Kas–Kaskol	+ 5' 54"
8	Antonio Bertrán (ESP)	Ferrys	+ 6' 33"
9	Valentín Uriona (ESP)	Kas–Kaskol	+ 6' 47"
10	Sebastián Elorza (ESP)	Kas–Kaskol	+ 9' 34"

== Stage 15 ==
14 May 1964 - Becilla to Valladolid, 65 km (40 mi) (ITT)

Route:

Stage 15 result

Rank	Rider	Team	Time
1	Raymond Poulidor (FRA)	Mercier–BP–Hutchinson	1h 34' 26"
2	Louis Proost (BEL)	Solo–Superia	+ 45"
3	Francisco Gabica (ESP)	Kas–Kaskol	+ 1' 57"
4	Eusebio Vélez (ESP)	Kas–Kaskol	+ 2' 35"
5	Valentín Uriona (ESP)	Kas–Kaskol	+ 2' 36"
6	José Pérez Francés (ESP)	Ferrys	+ 3' 13"
7	Luis Otaño (ESP)	Ferrys	+ 3' 22"
8	Frans Melckenbeeck (BEL)	Mercier–BP–Hutchinson	+ 4' 09"
9	José Antonio Momeñe (ESP)	Kas–Kaskol	+ 4' 57"
10	Fernando Manzaneque (ESP)	Ferrys	+ 5' 02"

General classification after Stage 15

Rank	Rider	Team	Time
1	Raymond Poulidor (FRA)	Mercier–BP–Hutchinson	70h 42' 36"
2	Luis Otaño (ESP)	Ferrys	+ 33"
3	José Pérez Francés (ESP)	Ferrys	+ 1' 56"
4	Eusebio Vélez (ESP)	Kas–Kaskol	+ 2' 04"
5	Julio Jiménez (ESP)	Kas–Kaskol	+ 3' 03"
6	Fernando Manzaneque (ESP)	Ferrys	+ 4' 19"
7	Valentín Uriona (ESP)	Kas–Kaskol	+ 6' 06"
8	José Antonio Momeñe (ESP)	Kas–Kaskol	+ 7' 34"
9	Francisco Gabica (ESP)	Kas–Kaskol	+ 8' 29"
10	Antonio Bertrán (ESP)	Ferrys	+ 11' 14"

== Stage 16 ==
15 May 1964 - Valladolid to Madrid, 209 km (130 mi)

Route:

Stage 16 result

Rank	Rider	Team	Time
1	Antonio Barrutia (ESP)	Kas–Kaskol	5h 40' 07"
2	Raúl Rey Fomosel (ESP)	Ferrys	+ 30"
3	Barry Hoban (GBR)	Mercier–BP–Hutchinson	+ 1' 10"
4	Carlos Echeverria (ESP)	Kas–Kaskol	s.t.
5	Willy Derboven (BEL)	Solo–Superia	s.t.
6	José Pérez Francés (ESP)	Ferrys	s.t.
7	Fernando Manzaneque (ESP)	Ferrys	s.t.
8	Arthur Decabooter (BEL)	Solo–Superia	s.t.
9	Armando Pellegrini (ITA)	Salvarani	s.t.
10	Michel Van Aerde (BEL)	Solo–Superia	s.t.

General classification after Stage 16

Rank	Rider	Team	Time
1	Raymond Poulidor (FRA)	Mercier–BP–Hutchinson	76h 23' 53"
2	Luis Otaño (ESP)	Ferrys	+ 33"
3	José Pérez Francés (ESP)	Ferrys	+ 1' 56"
4	Eusebio Vélez (ESP)	Kas–Kaskol	+ 2' 04"
5	Julio Jiménez (ESP)	Kas–Kaskol	+ 3' 03"
6	Fernando Manzaneque (ESP)	Ferrys	+ 4' 19"
7	Valentín Uriona (ESP)	Kas–Kaskol	+ 6' 06"
8	José Antonio Momeñe (ESP)	Kas–Kaskol	+ 7' 31"
9	Francisco Gabica (ESP)	Kas–Kaskol	+ 8' 29"
10	Antonio Bertrán (ESP)	Ferrys	+ 11' 14"

== Stage 17 ==
16 May 1964 - Madrid to Madrid, 87 km (54 mi)

Stage 17 result

Rank	Rider	Team	Time
1	Frans Melckenbeeck (BEL)	Mercier–BP–Hutchinson	1h 58' 42"
2	José Pérez Francés (ESP)	Ferrys	+ 30"
3	Michel Van Aerde (BEL)	Solo–Superia	+ 1' 00"
4	Willy Derboven (BEL)	Solo–Superia	s.t.
5	Wim van Est (NED)	Holland	s.t.
6	Raúl Rey Fomosel (ESP)	Ferrys	s.t.
7	Luis Otaño (ESP)	Ferrys	s.t.
8	Arthur Decabooter (BEL)	Solo–Superia	s.t.
9	Frans Aerenhouts (BEL)	Mercier–BP–Hutchinson	s.t.
10	Antonio Barrutia (ESP)	Kas–Kaskol	s.t.

General classification after Stage 17

Rank	Rider	Team	Time
1	Raymond Poulidor (FRA)	Mercier–BP–Hutchinson	78h 23' 35"
2	Luis Otaño (ESP)	Ferrys	+ 33"
3	José Pérez Francés (ESP)	Ferrys	+ 1' 56"
4	Eusebio Vélez (ESP)	Kas–Kaskol	+ 2' 04"
5	Julio Jiménez (ESP)	Kas–Kaskol	+ 3' 16"
6	Fernando Manzaneque (ESP)	Ferrys	+ 4' 19"
7	Valentín Uriona (ESP)	Kas–Kaskol	+ 6' 06"
8	José Antonio Momeñe (ESP)	Kas–Kaskol	+ 7' 31"
9	Francisco Gabica (ESP)	Kas–Kaskol	+ 8' 32"
10	Antonio Bertrán (ESP)	Ferrys	+ 11' 14"
