= 1964 Vuelta a España, Stage 1a to Stage 8 =

Cycling race stages

The 1964 Vuelta a España was the 19th edition of the Vuelta a España, one of cycling's Grand Tours. The Vuelta began in Benidorm on 30 April, and Stage 8 occurred on 7 May with a stage to Pamplona. The race finished in Madrid on 16 May.

== Stage 1a ==
30 April 1964 - Benidorm to Benidorm, 42 km (26.1 mi)

Stage 1a result and general classification after Stage 1a

	Rider	Team	Time
1	Edward Sels (BEL)	Solo–Superia	1h 01' 21"
2	Rik Van Looy (BEL)	Solo–Superia	+ 19"
3	Piet Rentmeester (NED)	Kas–Kaskol	+ 34"
4	Sergio Alzani (ITA)	Salvarani	s.t.
5	Frans Melckenbeeck (BEL)	Mercier–BP–Hutchinson	s.t.
6	Raymond Poulidor (FRA)	Mercier–BP–Hutchinson	s.t.
7	Michel Van Aerde (BEL)	Solo–Superia	s.t.
8	Arthur Decabooter (BEL)	Solo–Superia	s.t.
9	Willy Derboven (BEL)	Solo–Superia	s.t.
10	Lorenzo Carminati (ITA)	Salvarani	s.t.

== Stage 1b ==
30 April 1964 - Benidorm to Benidorm, 11 km (6.8 mi) (ITT)

Stage 1b result

Rank	Rider	Team	Time
1	Eusebio Vélez (ESP)	Kas–Kaskol	14' 05"
2	José Pérez Francés (ESP)	Ferrys	+ 22"
3	Raymond Poulidor (FRA)	Mercier–BP–Hutchinson	+ 39"
4	Miguel Pacheco (ESP)	Ferrys	+ 49"
5	Antonio Barrutia (ESP)	Kas–Kaskol	+ 51"
6	Victor Van Schil (BEL)	Mercier–BP–Hutchinson	+ 55"
7	Rik Van Looy (BEL)	Solo–Superia	s.t.
8	Luis Otaño (ESP)	Ferrys	s.t.
9	Valentín Uriona (ESP)	Kas–Kaskol	+ 58"
10	Wim van Est (NED)	Holland	+ 1' 02"

General classification after Stage 1b

Rank	Rider	Team	Time
1	Eusebio Vélez (ESP)	Kas–Kaskol	1h 16' 00"
2	José Pérez Francés (ESP)	Ferrys	+ 27"
3	Raymond Poulidor (FRA)	Mercier–BP–Hutchinson	+ 39"
4	Rik Van Looy (BEL)	Solo–Superia	+ 40"
5	Miguel Pacheco (ESP)	Ferrys	+ 49"
6	Luis Otaño (ESP)	Ferrys	+ 55"
7	Victor Van Schil (BEL)	Mercier–BP–Hutchinson	s.t.
8	Valentín Uriona (ESP)	Kas–Kaskol	+ 58"
9	Edward Sels (BEL)	Solo–Superia	+ 1' 01"
10	Wim van Est (NED)	Holland	+ 1' 02"

== Stage 2 ==
1 May 1964 - Benidorm to Nules, 199 km (123.7 mi)

Stage 2 result

Rank	Rider	Team	Time
1	Rik Van Looy (BEL)	Solo–Superia	4h 48' 05"
2	Edward Sels (BEL)	Solo–Superia	+ 30"
3	Fernando Manzaneque (ESP)	Ferrys	+ 1' 00"
4	Arthur Decabooter (BEL)	Solo–Superia	s.t.
5	José Pérez Francés (ESP)	Ferrys	s.t.
6	Lorenzo Carminati (ITA)	Salvarani	s.t.
7	Luis Otaño (ESP)	Ferrys	s.t.
8	José Antonio Momeñe (ESP)	Kas–Kaskol	s.t.
9	Willy Derboven (BEL)	Solo–Superia	s.t.
10	Eusebio Vélez (ESP)	Kas–Kaskol	s.t.

General classification after Stage 2

Rank	Rider	Team	Time
1	Rik Van Looy (BEL)	Solo–Superia	6h 04' 45"
2	Eusebio Vélez (ESP)	Kas–Kaskol	+ 20"
3	José Pérez Francés (ESP)	Ferrys	+ 44"
4	Edward Sels (BEL)	Solo–Superia	+ 51"
5	Raymond Poulidor (FRA)	Mercier–BP–Hutchinson	+ 1' 01"
6	Luis Otaño (ESP)	Ferrys	+ 1' 15"
7	Arthur Decabooter (BEL)	Solo–Superia	+ 1' 26"
8	Fernando Manzaneque (ESP)	Ferrys	+ 1' 30"
9	Juan María Uribezubia (ESP)	Inuri	+ 1' 40"
10	José Antonio Momeñe (ESP)	Kas–Kaskol	+ 1' 52"

== Stage 3 ==
2 May 1964 - Nules to Salou, 212 km (132 mi)

Stage 3 result

Rank	Rider	Team	Time
1	Frans Melckenbeeck (BEL)	Mercier–BP–Hutchinson	5h 08' 58"
2	Rik Van Looy (BEL)	Solo–Superia	+ 30"
3	José Pérez Francés (ESP)	Ferrys	+ 1' 00"
4	Arthur Decabooter (BEL)	Solo–Superia	s.t.
5	Adrianus Linders (NED)	Holland	s.t.
6	Romano Piancastelli (ITA)	Salvarani	s.t.
7	Wim van Est (NED)	Holland	s.t.
8	[[[Karel Colpaert]] (BEL)	Holland	s.t.
9	Gabriel Mas (ESP)	Ferrys	s.t.
10	Sebastián Elorza (ESP)	Kas–Kaskol	s.t.

General classification after Stage 3

Rank	Rider	Team	Time
1	Rik Van Looy (BEL)	Solo–Superia	11h 14' 13"
2	Eusebio Vélez (ESP)	Kas–Kaskol	+ 50"
3	José Pérez Francés (ESP)	Ferrys	+ 1' 12"
4	Edward Sels (BEL)	Solo–Superia	+ 1' 21"
5	Raymond Poulidor (FRA)	Mercier–BP–Hutchinson	+ 1' 29"
6	Luis Otaño (ESP)	Ferrys	+ 1' 45"
7	Arthur Decabooter (BEL)	Solo–Superia	+ 1' 56"
8	Fernando Manzaneque (ESP)	Ferrys	+ 2' 00"
9	José Antonio Momeñe (ESP)	Kas–Kaskol	+ 2' 22"
10	Lorenzo Carminati (ITA)	Salvarani	+ 3' 17"

== Stage 4a ==
3 May 1964 - Salou to Barcelona, 115 km (71 mi)

Stage 4a result

Rank	Rider	Team	Time
1	Armand Desmet (BEL)	Solo–Superia	3h 08' 40"
2	Rik Van Looy (BEL)	Solo–Superia	+ 17"
3	Frans Melckenbeeck (BEL)	Mercier–BP–Hutchinson	+ 32"
4	José Pérez Francés (ESP)	Ferrys	s.t.
5	Edward Sels (BEL)	Solo–Superia	s.t.
6	Sebastián Elorza (ESP)	Kas–Kaskol	s.t.
7	Eusebio Vélez (ESP)	Kas–Kaskol	s.t.
8	Michel Stolker (NED)	Kas–Kaskol	s.t.
9	José Antonio Momeñe (ESP)	Kas–Kaskol	s.t.
10	Antonio Barrutia (ESP)	Kas–Kaskol	s.t.

== Stage 4b ==
3 May 1964 - Barcelona to Barcelona, 49 km (30 mi)

Stage 4b result

Rank	Rider	Team	Time
1	Antonio Barrutia (ESP)	Kas–Kaskol	1h 21' 51"
2	Henri De Wolf (BEL)	Solo–Superia	+ 15"
3	Francisco José Suñé Montragull (ESP)	Ferrys	+ 30"
4	Victor Van Schil (BEL)	Mercier–BP–Hutchinson	s.t.
5	Edward Sels (BEL)	Solo–Superia	+ 39"
6	José Pérez Francés (ESP)	Ferrys	s.t.
7	Arthur Decabooter (BEL)	Solo–Superia	s.t.
8	Frans Melckenbeeck (BEL)	Mercier–BP–Hutchinson	s.t.
9	Andre Van Aert (NED)	Holland	s.t.
10	Frans Aerenhouts (BEL)	Mercier–BP–Hutchinson	s.t.

General classification after Stage 4b

Rank	Rider	Team	Time
1	Rik Van Looy (BEL)	Solo–Superia	15h 45' 40"
2	Eusebio Vélez (ESP)	Kas–Kaskol	+ 1' 05"
3	José Pérez Francés (ESP)	Ferrys	+ 1' 27"
4	Edward Sels (BEL)	Solo–Superia	+ 1' 36"
5	Raymond Poulidor (FRA)	Mercier–BP–Hutchinson	+ 1' 44"
6	Luis Otaño (ESP)	Ferrys	+ 2' 00"
7	Arthur Decabooter (BEL)	Solo–Superia	+ 2' 11"
8	Fernando Manzaneque (ESP)	Ferrys	+ 2' 15"
9	José Antonio Momeñe (ESP)	Kas–Kaskol	+ 2' 37"
10	Lorenzo Carminati (ITA)	Salvarani	+ 3' 32"

== Stage 5 ==
4 May 1964 - Barcelona to Puigcerdà, 174 km (108 mi)

Route:

Stage 5 result

Rank	Rider	Team	Time
1	Julio Jiménez (ESP)	Kas–Kaskol	4h 39' 27"
2	José Pérez Francés (ESP)	Ferrys	+ 36"
3	Raymond Poulidor (FRA)	Mercier–BP–Hutchinson	+ 1' 08"
4	Fernando Manzaneque (ESP)	Ferrys	+ 1' 11"
5	Rik Van Looy (BEL)	Solo–Superia	s.t.
6	Eusebio Vélez (ESP)	Kas–Kaskol	+ 1' 16"
7	Francisco Gabica (ESP)	Kas–Kaskol	+ 1' 17"
8	Armand Desmet (BEL)	Solo–Superia	+ 1' 20"
9	Sebastián Elorza (ESP)	Kas–Kaskol	+ 1' 26"
10	Valentín Uriona (ESP)	Kas–Kaskol	+ 1' 30"

== Stage 6 ==
5 May 1964 - Puigcerdà to Lleida, 187 km (116 mi)

Route:

Stage 6 result

Rank	Rider	Team	Time
1	Frans Melckenbeeck (BEL)	Mercier–BP–Hutchinson	4h 59' 35"
2	José Pérez Francés (ESP)	Ferrys	+ 30"
3	Arthur Decabooter (BEL)	Solo–Superia	+ 1' 00"
4	Edward Sels (BEL)	Solo–Superia	s.t.
5	Armando Pellegrini (ITA)	Salvarani	s.t.
6	Adrianus Linders (NED)	Holland	s.t.
7	Wim van Est (NED)	Holland	s.t.
8	Antonio Barrutia (ESP)	Kas–Kaskol	s.t.
9	Frans Aerenhouts (BEL)	Mercier–BP–Hutchinson	s.t.
10	Gabriel Mas (ESP)	Ferrys	s.t.

General classification after Stage 6

Rank	Rider	Team	Time
1	José Pérez Francés (ESP)	Ferrys	25h 27' 17"
2	Eusebio Vélez (ESP)	Kas–Kaskol	+ 46"
3	Raymond Poulidor (FRA)	Mercier–BP–Hutchinson	+ 1' 17"
4	Fernando Manzaneque (ESP)	Ferrys	+ 1' 51"
5	Edward Sels (BEL)	Solo–Superia	+ 4' 15"
6	Luis Otaño (ESP)	Ferrys	+ 4' 29"
7	Arthur Decabooter (BEL)	Solo–Superia	+ 4' 40"
8	José Antonio Momeñe (ESP)	Kas–Kaskol	+ 5' 06"
9	Lorenzo Carminati (ITA)	Salvarani	+ 6' 01"
10	Julio Jiménez (ESP)	Kas–Kaskol	+ 6' 40"

== Stage 7 ==
6 May 1964 - Lleida to Jaca, 201 km (125 mi)

Route:

Stage 7 result

Rank	Rider	Team	Time
1	Julio Sanz (ESP)	Inuri	5h 48' 27"
2	Fulgencio Sánchez (ESP)	Inuri	+ 2' 42"
3	Manuel Costa (POR)	Portugal	+ 3' 12"
4	José Pérez Francés (ESP)	Ferrys	+ 6' 02"
5	Robert Cazala (FRA)	Mercier–BP–Hutchinson	s.t.
6	Romano Piancastelli (ITA)	Salvarani	s.t.
7	Arthur Decabooter (BEL)	Solo–Superia	s.t.
8	Edward Sels (BEL)	Solo–Superia	s.t.
9	Jean-Pierre Genet (FRA)	Mercier–BP–Hutchinson	s.t.
10	Frans Aerenhouts (BEL)	Mercier–BP–Hutchinson	s.t.

General classification after Stage 7

Rank	Rider	Team	Time
1	José Pérez Francés (ESP)	Ferrys	31h 21' 46"
2	Eusebio Vélez (ESP)	Kas–Kaskol	+ 46"
3	Raymond Poulidor (FRA)	Mercier–BP–Hutchinson	+ 1' 17"
4	Fernando Manzaneque (ESP)	Ferrys	+ 1' 51"
5	Edward Sels (BEL)	Solo–Superia	+ 4' 05"
6	Luis Otaño (ESP)	Ferrys	+ 4' 29"
7	Arthur Decabooter (BEL)	Solo–Superia	+ 4' 40"
8	José Antonio Momeñe (ESP)	Kas–Kaskol	+ 5' 06"
9	Lorenzo Carminati (ITA)	Salvarani	+ 6' 01"
10	Julio Jiménez (ESP)	Kas–Kaskol	+ 6' 40"

== Stage 8 ==
7 May 1964 - Jaca to Pamplona, 205 km (127 mi)

Route:

Stage 8 result

Rank	Rider	Team	Time
1	Michel Stolker (NED)	Kas–Kaskol	5h 25' 25"
2	Gabriel Mas (ESP)	Ferrys	+ 30"
3	Victor Van Schil (BEL)	Mercier–BP–Hutchinson	+ 1' 00"
4	Romano Piancastelli (ITA)	Salvarani	s.t.
5	Rogelio Hernández Santibáñez (ESP)	Ferrys	s.t.
6	Sebastián Elorza (ESP)	Kas–Kaskol	+ 1' 03"
7	José Pérez Francés (ESP)	Ferrys	+ 1' 30"
8	José Antonio Momeñe (ESP)	Kas–Kaskol	s.t.
9	Raymond Poulidor (FRA)	Mercier–BP–Hutchinson	s.t.
10	Fernando Manzaneque (ESP)	Ferrys	s.t.

General classification after Stage 8

Rank	Rider	Team	Time
1	José Pérez Francés (ESP)	Ferrys	36h 48' 51"
2	Eusebio Vélez (ESP)	Kas–Kaskol	+ 46"
3	Raymond Poulidor (FRA)	Mercier–BP–Hutchinson	+ 1' 17"
4	Fernando Manzaneque (ESP)	Ferrys	+ 1' 51"
5	Luis Otaño (ESP)	Ferrys	+ 4' 29"
6	José Antonio Momeñe (ESP)	Kas–Kaskol	+ 5' 06"
7	Arthur Decabooter (BEL)	Solo–Superia	+ 7' 00"
8	Sebastián Elorza (ESP)	Kas–Kaskol	+ 7' 16"
9	Francisco Gabica (ESP)	Kas–Kaskol	+ 8' 10"
10	Julio Jiménez (ESP)	Kas–Kaskol	+ 8' 13"
