= Emilio Cruz (cyclist) =

Spanish cyclist

Personal information
- Full name: Emilio Cruz Díaz
- Born: 27 November 1936 (age 89) Torrelavega, Spain

Cycling career
- Sport: Cycling
- Discipline: Road
- Role: Rider

Professional teams
- 1957: Boxing Club
- 1958: Lube–NSU
- 1959: Kas–Boxing
- 1960–1964: Ferrys
- 1965: Olsa

Emilio Cruz Díaz (born 27 November 1936) is a Spanish former racing cyclist. He rode in the 1963 Tour de France as well as four editions of the Vuelta a España.

== Major results ==
1955
2nd Prueba Villafranca de Ordizia
1957
1st Klasika Primavera
1958
1st GP Torrelavega
1960
3rd Overall Volta a Catalunya

1st Stage 3 (TTT)

5th Overall Euskal Bizikleta
1961
1st Stage 2 Volta a Catalunya
7th Overall Tour de l'Avenir

1st Stage 3

8th Campeonato Vasco Navarro de Montaña
1962
1st Circuito Montañés
3rd GP Villafranca de Ordizia
1963
5th Overall Vuelta a la Comunidad Valenciana
