= 1965 Vuelta a España =

Race details
- Dates: 29 April – 16 May
- Stages: 18
- Distance: 3,410 km (2,119 mi)
- Winning time: 92h 36' 03"

Results
Jersey awarded to the overall winner	Winner	Rolf Wolfshohl (FRG)	(Mercier-BP-Hutchinson)
	Second	Raymond Poulidor (FRA)	(Mercier-BP-Hutchinson)
	Third	Rik Van Looy (BEL)	(Solo-Superia)
Jersey awarded to the points classification winner	Points	Rik Van Looy (BEL)	(Solo-Superia)
	Mountains	Julio Jiménez (ESP)	(Kas–Kaskol)
	Sprints	José Segu (ESP)	(Montjuich – Tedi)

The 20th Vuelta a España (Tour of Spain), a long-distance bicycle stage race and one of the three grand tours, was held from 29 April to 16 May 1965. It consisted of 18 stages covering a total of 3,410 km (2,120 mi), and was won by Rolf Wolfshohl of the Mercier cycling team. Julio Jiménez won the mountains classification while Rik Van Looy won the points classification.

== Route ==
List of stages
Stage	Date	Course	Distance	Type	Winner
1	29 April	Vigo to Vigo	168 km (104 mi)		Rik Van Looy (BEL)
2	30 April	Pontevedra to Lugo	150 km (93 mi)		Rik Van Looy (BEL)
3	1 May	Lugo to Gijón	247 km (153 mi)		Rudi Altig (FRG)
4a	2 May	Mieres to Pajares	41 km (25 mi)	Individual time trial	Raymond Poulidor (FRA)
4b	2 May	Pajares to Palencia	189 km (117 mi)		Carlos Echeverría (ESP)
5	3 May	Palencia to Madrid	238 km (148 mi)		Fernando Manzaneque (ESP)
6	4 May	Madrid to Cuenca	161 km (100 mi)		Manuel Martín Piñera (ESP)
7	5 May	Albacete to Benidorm	212 km (132 mi)		Rik Van Looy (BEL)
8	6 May	Benidorm to Sagunto	174 km (108 mi)		Jean-Claude Wuillemin (FRA)
9	7 May	Sagunto to Salou	237 km (147 mi)		Rik Van Looy (BEL)
10a	8 May	Salou to Barcelona	115 km (71 mi)		Frans Melckenbeeck (BEL)
10b	8 May	Barcelona to Barcelona	50 km (31 mi)		Julio Jiménez (ESP)
11	9 May	Barcelona to Andorra	241 km (150 mi)		Esteban Martín (ESP)
12	10 May	Andorra to Lleida	158 km (98 mi)		Rik Van Looy (BEL)
13	11 May	Lleida to Zaragoza	190 km (118 mi)		José Martín Colmenarejo (ESP)
14	12 May	Zaragoza to Pamplona	193 km (120 mi)		Rik Van Looy (BEL)
15	13 May	Pamplona to Bayonne (France)	149 km (93 mi)		Rik Van Looy (BEL)
16	14 May	Saint-Pée-sur-Nivelle (France) to San Sebastián	61 km (38 mi)	Individual time trial	Raymond Poulidor (FRA)
17	15 May	San Sebastián to Vitoria	214 km (133 mi)		Rik Van Looy (BEL)
18	16 May	Vitoria to Bilbao	222 km (138 mi)		Manuel Martín Piñera (ESP)
	Total		3,410 km (2,119 mi)		

== Results ==
Final general classification
Rank	Rider	Team	Time
1	(West Germany) Rolf Wolfshohl	Mercier-BP-Hutchinson	92h 36' 03"
2	(France) Raymond Poulidor	Mercier-BP-Hutchinson	+ 6' 36"
3	(Belgium) Rik Van Looy	Solo-Superia	+ 8' 55"
4	(Spain) Fernando Manzaneque	Ferrys	+ 12' 48"
5	(Spain) Carlos Echeverría	Kas	+ 15' 54"
6	(Spain) Francisco Gabica	Kas	+ 20' 03"
7	(West Germany) Hans Junkermann	Inuri-Margnat	+ 20' 13"
8	(France) Jean-Claude Wuillemin	Ford-Gitane	+ 20' 13"
9	(Spain) Antonio Gómez del Moral	Kas	+ 23' 04"
10	(Spain) Federico Bahamontes	Inuri-Margnat	+ 23' 13"
11	(France) Lucien Aimar	Ford-Gitane	
12	(France) Jean-Claude Lebaube	Ford-Gitane	
13	(Belgium) Victor Van Schil	Mercier-BP-Hutchinson	
14	(Spain) Luis Otaño	Ferrys	
15	(Belgium) Frans Verbeeck	Wiels-Groene Leeuw	
16	(Spain) Joaquin Galera	Kas	
17	(Spain) Sebastián Elorza	Kas	
18	(Belgium) Eddy Pauwels	Wiels-Groene Leeuw	
19	(Belgium) Jef Planckaert	Solo-Superia	
20	(France) Michel Grain	Ford-Gitane	
21	(Spain) Manuel Martín Piñera	Kas	
22	(Belgium) Joseph Timmerman	Wiels-Groene Leeuw	
23	(Spain) Ventura Díaz	Olsa	
24	(Spain) Jaime Alomar Florit	Ferrys	
25	(Belgium) Armand Desmet	Solo-Superia	
