= Uribezubia =

Uribezubia is a surname. Notable people with the surname include:

- José Luis Uribezubia (born 1945), Spanish former racing cyclist
- Juan María Uribezubia (1940–2018), Spanish racing cyclist
