= Luisier =

Luisier is a surname. Notable people with the surname include:

- Christelle Luisier (born 1974), Swiss politician and lawyer
- Jean Luisier (1937–1969), Swiss racing cyclist
