= 1963 Critérium du Dauphiné Libéré =

Race details
- Dates: 3–9 June 1963
- Stages: 7
- Distance: 1,441 km (895 mi)
- Winning time: 40h 07' 16"

Results
	Winner	Jacques Anquetil (FRA)	(Saint-Raphaël–Gitane–R. Geminiani)
	Second	Jose Perez Frances (ESP)	(Ferrys)
	Third	Fernando Manzaneque (ESP)	(Ferrys)
	Points	Jose Perez Frances (ESP)	(Ferrys)
	Mountains	Federico Bahamontes (ESP)	(Margnat–Paloma–Dunlop)
	Team	Saint-Raphaël–Gitane–R. Geminiani	

The 1963 Critérium du Dauphiné Libéré was the 17th edition of the cycle race and was held from 3 June to 9 June 1963. The race started in Évian and finished in Grenoble. The race was won by Jacques Anquetil of the Saint-Raphaël team.

== General classification ==
Final general classification

Rank	Rider	Team	Time
1	Jacques Anquetil (FRA)	Saint-Raphaël–Gitane–R. Geminiani	40h 07' 16"
2	José Pérez Francés (ESP)	Ferrys	+ 1' 19"
3	Fernando Manzaneque (ESP)	Ferrys	+ 2' 14"
4	Angelino Soler (ESP)	Flandria–Faema	+ 2' 15"
5	Federico Bahamontes (ESP)	Margnat–Paloma–Dunlop	+ 4' 48"
6	Jean-Claude Lebaube (FRA)	Saint-Raphaël–Gitane–R. Geminiani	+ 5' 12"
7	Louis Rostollan (FRA)	Saint-Raphaël–Gitane–R. Geminiani	+ 8' 02"
8	Anatole Novak (FRA)	Saint-Raphaël–Gitane–R. Geminiani	+ 9' 37"
9	Antonio Gómez del Moral (ESP)	Flandria–Faema	+ 10' 24"
10	Jef Planckaert (BEL)	Flandria–Faema	+ 10' 57"
