= 1964 Vuelta a España =

Race details
- Dates: 30 April – 16 May
- Stages: 17
- Distance: 2,860 km (1,777 mi)
- Winning time: 78h 23' 35"

Results
Jersey awarded to the overall winner	Winner	Raymond Poulidor (FRA)	(Mercier-BP-Hutchinson)
	Second	Luis Otaño (ESP)	(Ferrys)
	Third	José Pérez Francés (ESP)	(Ferrys)
Jersey awarded to the points classification winner	Points	José Pérez Francés (ESP)	(Ferrys)
	Mountains	Julio Jiménez (ESP)	(Kas-Kaskol)
	Sprints	Antonio Bertrán (ESP)	(Ferrys)

The 19th Vuelta a España (Tour of Spain), a long-distance bicycle stage race and one of the three grand tours, was held from 30 April to 16 May 1964. It consisted of 17 stages covering a total of 2,860 km (1,780 mi), and was won by Raymond Poulidor of the Mercier cycling team. José Pérez Francés won the points classification and Julio Jiménez won the mountains classification.

== Route ==
List of stages
Stage	Date	Course	Distance	Type	Winner
1a	30 April	Benidorm to Benidorm	42 km (26 mi)		Edward Sels (BEL)
1b	30 April	Benidorm to Benidorm	11 km (7 mi)	Individual time trial	Eusebio Vélez (ESP)
2	1 May	Benidorm to Nules	199 km (124 mi)		Rik Van Looy (BEL)
3	2 May	Nules to Salou	212 km (132 mi)		Frans Melckenbeeck (BEL)
4a	3 May	Salou to Barcelona	115 km (71 mi)		Armand Desmet (BEL)
4b	3 May	Barcelona to Barcelona	49 km (30 mi)		Antonio Barrutia (ESP)
5	4 May	Barcelona to Puigcerdà	174 km (108 mi)		Julio Jiménez (ESP)
6	5 May	Puigcerdà to Lleida	187 km (116 mi)		Frans Melckenbeeck (BEL)
7	6 May	Lleida to Jaca	201 km (125 mi)		Julio Sanz (ESP)
8	7 May	Jaca to Pamplona	205 km (127 mi)		Michel Stolker (NED)
9	8 May	Pamplona to San Sebastián	205 km (127 mi)		Luis Otaño (ESP)
10	9 May	San Sebastián to Bilbao	197 km (122 mi)		Henri De Wolf (BEL)
11	10 May	Bilbao to Vitoria	107 km (66 mi)		Victor Van Schil (BEL)
12	11 May	Vitoria to Santander	211 km (131 mi)		Barry Hoban (GBR)
13	12 May	Santander to Avilés	230 km (143 mi)		Barry Hoban (GBR)
14	13 May	Avilés to León	163 km (101 mi)		Julio Jiménez (ESP)
15	14 May	Becilla to Valladolid	65 km (40 mi)	Individual time trial	Raymond Poulidor (FRA)
16	15 May	Valladolid to Madrid	209 km (130 mi)		Antonio Barrutia (ESP)
17	16 May	Madrid to Madrid	87 km (54 mi)		Frans Melckenbeeck (BEL)
	Total		2,860 km (1,777 mi)		

== Results ==
Final general classification
Rank	Rider	Team	Time
1	(France) Raymond Poulidor	Mercier-BP-Hutchinson	78h 23' 35"
2	(Spain) Luis Otaño	Ferrys	+ 33"
3	(Spain) José Pérez Francés	Ferrys	+ 1' 26"
4	(Spain) Eusebio Vélez	Kas-Kaskol	+ 2' 04"
5	(Spain) Julio Jiménez	Kas-Kaskol	+ 3' 16"
6	(Spain) Fernando Manzaneque	Ferrys	+ 4' 19"
7	(Spain) Valentín Uriona	Kas-Kaskol	+ 6' 06"
8	(Spain) José Antonio Momeñe	Kas-Kaskol	+ 9' 31"
9	(Spain) Francisco Gabica	Kas-Kaskol	+ 9' 32"
10	(Spain) Antonio Bertrán Panadés	Ferrys	+ 11' 14"
11	(Spain) Sebastián Elorza	Kas-Kaskol	
12	(Belgium) Victor Van Schil	Mercier-BP-Hutchinson	
13	(France) Robert Cazala	Mercier-BP-Hutchinson	
14	(Belgium) Henri De Wolf	Solo Superia	
15	(Spain) Antonio Karmany Mestres	Ferrys	
16	(Belgium) Arthur Decabooter	Solo Superia	
17	(Netherlands) Wim van Est	Locomotief	
18	(Spain) Carlos Echeverría	Kas-Kaskol	
19	(France) André Le Dissez	Mercier-BP-Hutchinson	
20	(France) Jean-Pierre Genet	Mercier-BP-Hutchinson	
21	(Spain) Ventura Díaz	Inuri	
22	(Belgium) Louis Proost	Solo Superia	
23	(Portugal) Francisco Valada		
24	(Belgium) Michel Van Aerde	Solo Superia	
