= 1960 Volta a Catalunya =

Race details
- Dates: 4–11 September 1960
- Stages: 8
- Distance: 1,247.7 km (775.3 mi)
- Winning time: 33h 26' 29"

Results
	Winner	Miguel Poblet (ESP)
	Second	José Pérez Francés (ESP)
	Third	Emilio Cruz Díaz (ESP)

The 1960 Volta a Catalunya was the 40th edition of the Volta a Catalunya cycle race and was held from 4 September to 11 September 1960. The race started in Montjuïc and finished in Barcelona. The race was won by Miguel Poblet.

== General classification ==
Final general classification

Rank	Rider	Time
1	Miguel Poblet (ESP)	33h 26' 29"
2	José Pérez Francés (ESP)	+ 3' 56"
3	Emilio Cruz Díaz (ESP)	+ 5' 03"
4	Gabriel Mas (ESP)	+ 5' 50"
5	Antonio Bertrán (ESP)	+ 6' 29"
6	José Gómez del Moral (ESP)	+ 6' 52"
7	Manuel Santiago Montilla (ESP)	+ 7' 09"
8	Antonio Gómez del Moral (ESP)	+ 8' 12"
9	Julio San Emeterio (ESP)	+ 8' 33"
10	José Quesada Nortes (ESP)	+ 8' 59"
