= Ian Moore (cyclist) =

Irish cyclist

Personal information
- Born: 11 November 1938 (age 87)

Cycling career
- Sport: Cycling
- Role: Rider

Ian Moore (born 11 November 1938) is an Irish racing cyclist. He rode in the 1961 Tour de France.
