= Claude Sauvage =

French cyclist

Personal information
- Born: 18 July 1936
- Died: 8 February 2011 (aged 74)

Cycling career
- Sport: Cycling
- Role: Rider

Claude Sauvage (18 July 1936 – 8 February 2011) was a French racing cyclist. He rode in the 1961 Tour de France.
