= Jean-Pierre Sintges =

Luxembourgish cyclist

Personal information
- Born: 1 June 1938 (age 88)

Cycling career
- Sport: Cycling
- Role: Rider

Jean-Pierre Sintges (born 1 June 1938) is a Luxembourgish racing cyclist. He rode in the 1961 Tour de France.
