= Fritz Gallati =

Swiss cyclist (1935–2020)

Personal information
- Born: 24 March 1935
- Died: 25 October 2020 (aged 85)

Cycling career
- Sport: Cycling
- Role: Rider

Fritz Gallati (24 March 1935 – 25 October 2020) was a Swiss racing cyclist. He rode in the 1961 Tour de France.
