= Josef Borghard =

German cyclist

Personal information
- Born: 5 December 1933 (age 92)

Cycling career
- Sport: Cycling
- Role: Rider

Josef Borghard (born 5 December 1933) is a German racing cyclist. He rode in the 1961 Tour de France.
