= George O'Brien (cyclist) =

British cyclist

Personal information
- Born: 3 January 1935 (age 91) Liverpool, England

Cycling career
- Sport: Cycling
- Role: Rider

George O'Brien (born 3 January 1935) is a British racing cyclist. He rode in the 1961 Tour de France.
