= Serge Ruchet =

Swiss cyclist

Personal information
- Born: 11 February 1938 (age 88)

Cycling career
- Sport: Cycling
- Role: Rider

Serge Ruchet (born 11 February 1938) is a Swiss racing cyclist. He rode in the 1961 Tour de France.
