= Sean Ryan (cyclist) =

British cyclist

Personal information
- Born: 21 January 1941 (age 85)

Cycling career
- Sport: Cycling
- Role: Rider

Sean Ryan (born 21 January 1941) is a British racing cyclist. He rode in the 1961 Tour de France.
