= Joseph Vloeberghs =

Belgian cyclist

Personal information
- Born: 15 November 1935
- Died: 21 May 1992 (aged 56)

Cycling career
- Sport: Cycling
- Role: Rider

Joseph Vloeberghs (15 November 1935 – 21 May 1992) was a Belgian racing cyclist. He rode in the 1961 Tour de France.
