= Helmut Kuckelkorn =

German cyclist (1937–2018)

Personal information
- Born: 9 February 1937
- Died: 18 March 2018 (aged 81)

Cycling career
- Sport: Cycling
- Role: Rider

Helmut Kuckelkorn (9 February 1937 – 18 March 2018) was a German racing cyclist. He rode in the 1961 Tour de France, Tour de Luxembourg, and Deutschland Tour.
