= Marc Huiart =

French cyclist

Personal information
- Born: 5 July 1936
- Died: 29 July 1962 (aged 26)

Cycling career
- Sport: Cycling
- Role: Rider

Marc Huiart (5 July 1936 – 29 July 1962) was a French racing cyclist. He rode in the 1961 Tour de France.
