= Raymond Bley =

Luxembourgish cyclist

Personal information
- Born: 13 February 1939 Rodange, Luxembourg
- Died: 25 March 2012 (aged 73) Luxembourg, Luxembourg

Cycling career
- Sport: Cycling

Raymond Bley (13 February 1939 – 25 March 2012) was a Luxembourgish cyclist. He competed in the team time trial at the 1960 Summer Olympics.
