= Philippe Gaudrillet =

French cyclist

Personal information
- Born: 22 July 1936 (age 90)

Cycling career
- Sport: Cycling
- Role: Rider

Philippe Gaudrillet (French: [filip ɡodʁijɛ]; born 23 July 1936) is a French racing cyclist. He rode in the 1961 Tour de France.
