= Ludwig Troche =

German cyclist

Personal information
- Born: 23 December 1935 (age 90)

Cycling career
- Sport: Cycling
- Role: Rider

Ludwig Troche (born 23 December 1935) is a German racing cyclist. He rode in the 1961 Tour de France.
