= Peter Ryalls =

British cyclist (1938–2017)

Personal information
- Born: 29 January 1938
- Died: 26 August 2017 (aged 79)

Cycling career
- Sport: Cycling
- Role: Rider

Peter Ryalls (29 January 1938 – 26 August 2017) was a British racing cyclist. He rode in the 1961 Tour de France.
