= Jean Luisier =

Swiss cyclist

Personal information
- Born: 15 November 1937 Saillon, Switzerland
- Died: 1969 (aged 31–32)

Cycling career
- Sport: Cycling
- Role: Rider

Jean Luisier (15 November 1937 – 1969) was a Swiss racing cyclist. He rode in the 1961 Tour de France.
