= Juan María Uribezubia =

Spanish cyclist

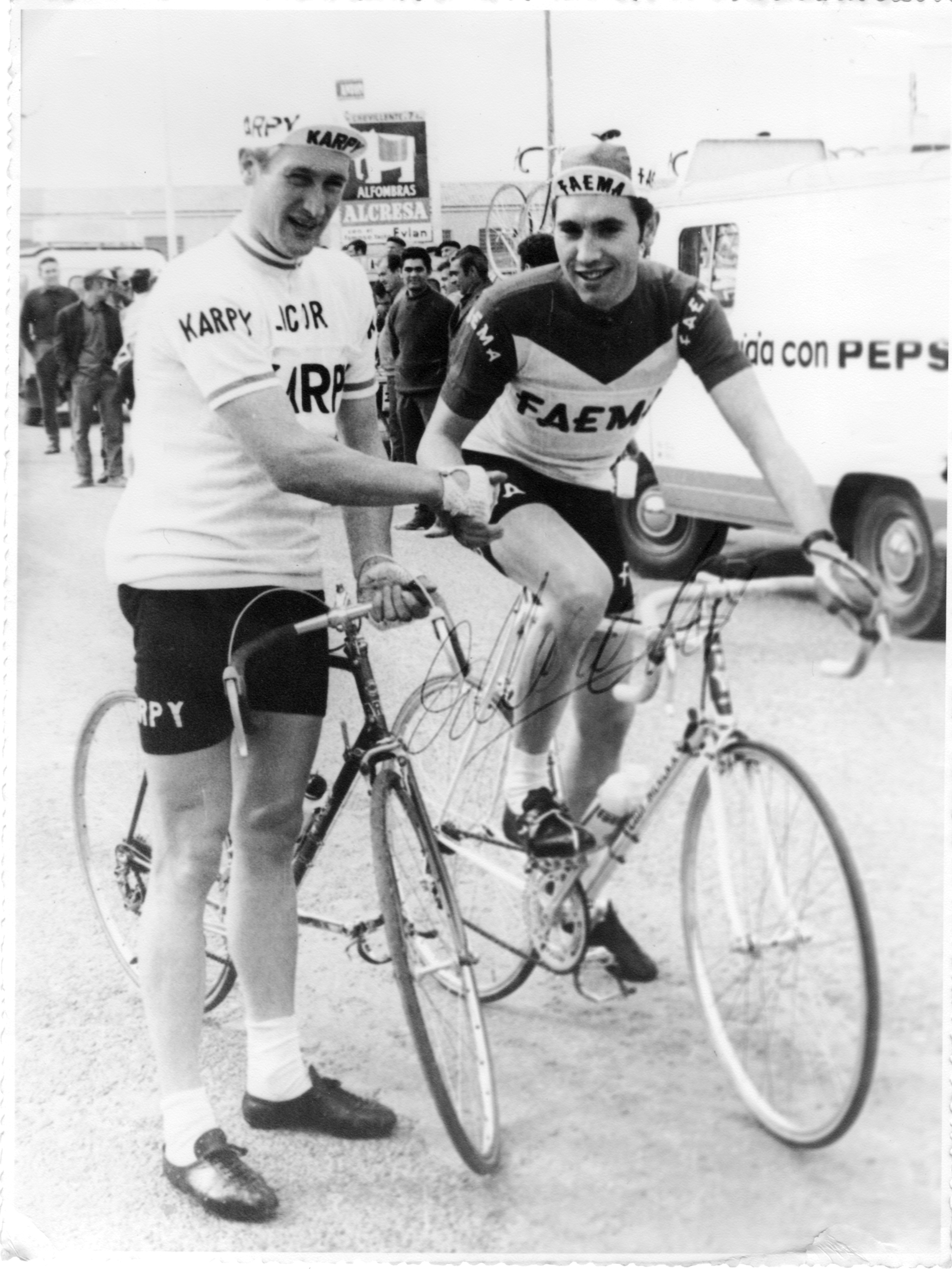
- Juan Maria Uribezubia (left) and Eddy Merckx

Personal information
- Born: 4 April 1940 Elorrio, Spain
- Died: 14 July 2018 (aged 78) Durango, Biscay, Spain

Cycling career
- Sport: Cycling
- Discipline: Road
- Role: Rider

Professional teams
- 1961–1962: Funcor–Munguia
- 1963: Pinturas Ega
- 1964–1967: Kas–Kaskol
- 1968–1970: Karpy

Juan María Uribezubia (4 April 1940 – 14 July 2018) was a Spanish racing cyclist. He rode in the 1964 Tour de France as well as in four editions of the Vuelta a España.

== Major results ==
1961
1st Stage 1 Volta a Catalunya
2nd Overall Milk Race
1965
1st Overall Vuelta a La Rioja

1st Stage 3

1966
1st Overall Vuelta a Mallorca

1st Stage 3

1969
1st Stage 4a Volta a Catalunya
