= Becilla de Valderaduey =

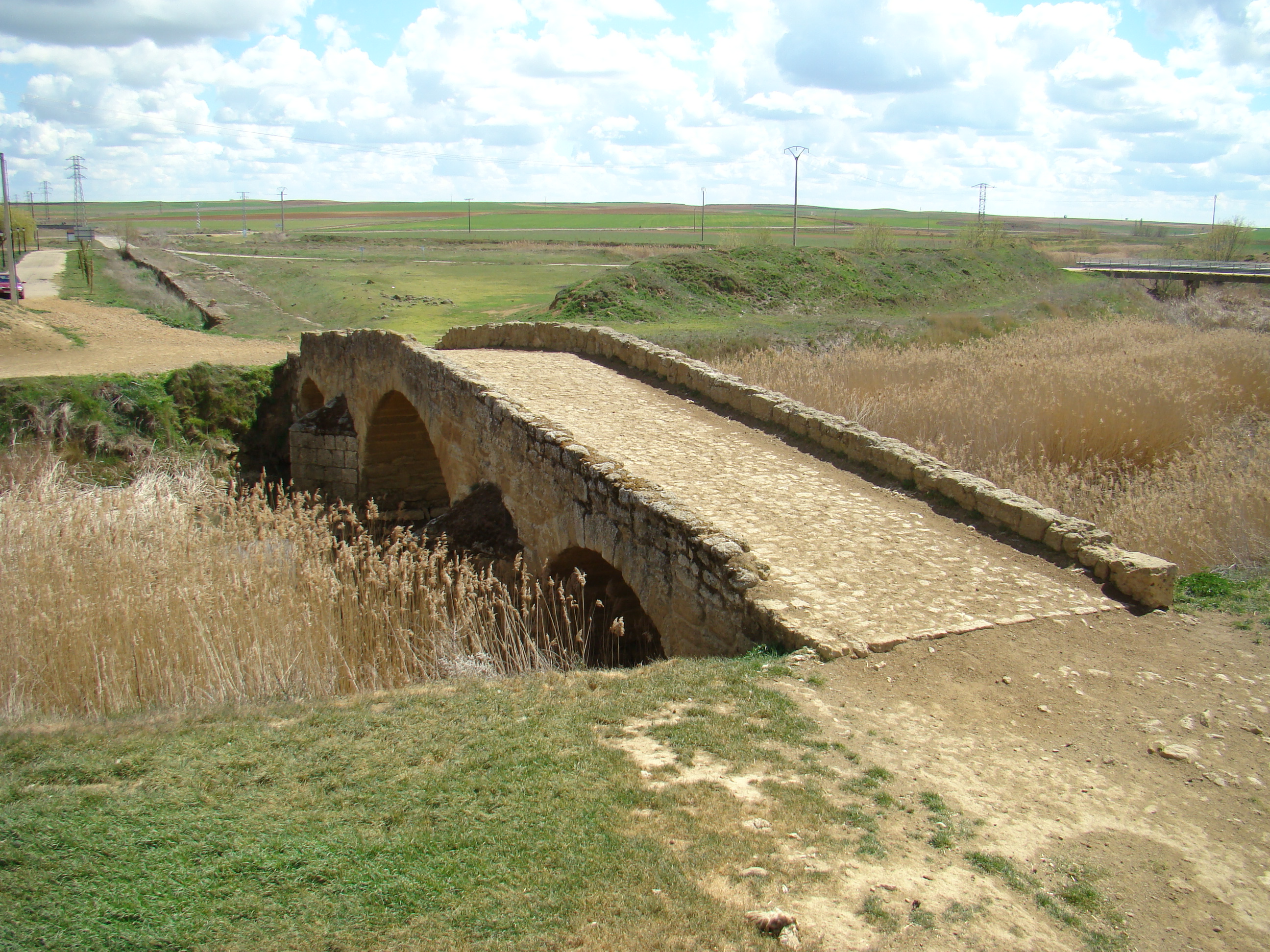
- Roman bridge

- Coat of arms

- Location in Spain.
- Coordinates: 42°6′N 5°13′W
- Country: Spain
- Autonomous community: Castile and León
- Province: Valladolid
- Comarca: Tierra de Campos

Government
  - Mayor: Emilio Castañeda Villagra

Area
  - Total: 38.18 km^{2} (14.74 sq mi)
- Elevation: 715 m (2,346 ft)

Population (2025-01-01)
  - Total: 206
  - Density: 5.40/km^{2} (14.0/sq mi)
- Time zone: UTC+1 (CET)
  - Summer (DST): UTC+2 (CEST)
- Postal code: 47670

Becilla de Valderaduey is a municipality located in Valladolid, Castile and León, Spain. According to the 2025 census (INE), the municipality had a population of 206 inhabitants.

Some inhabitants are farmers, and own cattle, especially sheep.
