= Carlos Echeverría =

Carlos Echeverría may refer to:

- Carlos Echeverría (cyclist)
- Carlos Echeverria (sailor)

== See also ==
- Carlos Echevarría, Argentine actor, producer, and writer
