= 1961 Volta a Catalunya =

Race details
- Dates: 17–24 September 1961
- Stages: 8
- Distance: 1,273 km (791.0 mi)
- Winning time: 34h 56' 57"

Results
	Winner	Henri Duez (FRA)
	Second	Juan Jorge Nicolau Moria (ESP)
	Third	Juan Manuel Menéndez (ESP)

The 1961 Volta a Catalunya was the 41st edition of the Volta a Catalunya cycle race and was held from 17 September to 24 September 1961. The race started in Montjuïc and finished in Barcelona. The race was won by Henri Duez.

== General classification ==
Final general classification

Rank	Rider	Time
1	Henri Duez (FRA)	34h 56' 57"
2	Juan Jorge Nicolau Moria (ESP)	+ 1' 17"
3	Juan Manuel Menéndez (ESP)	+ 3' 02"
4	Miguel Pacheco (ESP)	+ 6' 29"
5	José Pérez Francés (ESP)	+ 7' 49"
6	Ángel Rodríguez López (ESP)	+ 9' 03"
7	Fernando Manzaneque (ESP)	+ 9' 15"
8	Antonio Karmany (ESP)	+ 9' 36"
9	José Segú (ESP)	+ 9' 54"
10	Salvador Rosa Gómez (ESP)	+ 10' 25"
