= Jaime Alomar =

Spanish cyclist (1937–2024)

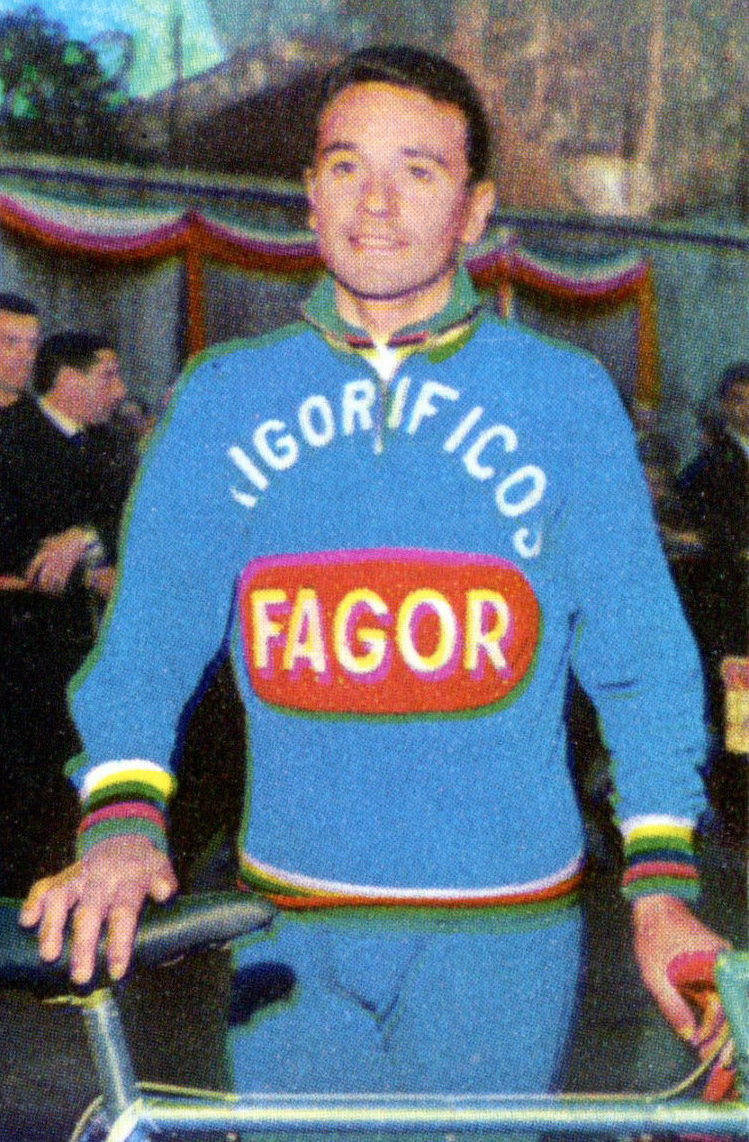
- Alomar in 1967

Personal information
- Born: 24 December 1937 Sineu, Mallorca, Spain
- Died: 7 August 2024 (aged 86) Petra, Mallorca, Spain

Cycling career
- Sport: Cycling
- Current team: Retired
- Discipline: Road
- Role: Rider

Professional teams
- 1959–1962: Peugeot–BP–Dunlop
- 1963–1964: Cite
- 1965: Ferrys
- 1966–1968: Fagor

Jaime Alomar Florit (24 December 1937 – 7 August 2024) was a Spanish road racing cyclist, who competed professionally between 1959 and 1968. He won the 1961 Tour de Picardie, the 1963 Coppa Ugo Agostoni and the third stage of 1963 Giro d'Italia, and rode the Tour de France in 1961, 1962 and 1967. His elder brother Francisco Alomar was also a professional cyclist.
