= Henri De Wolf =

Belgian cyclist (1936–2023)

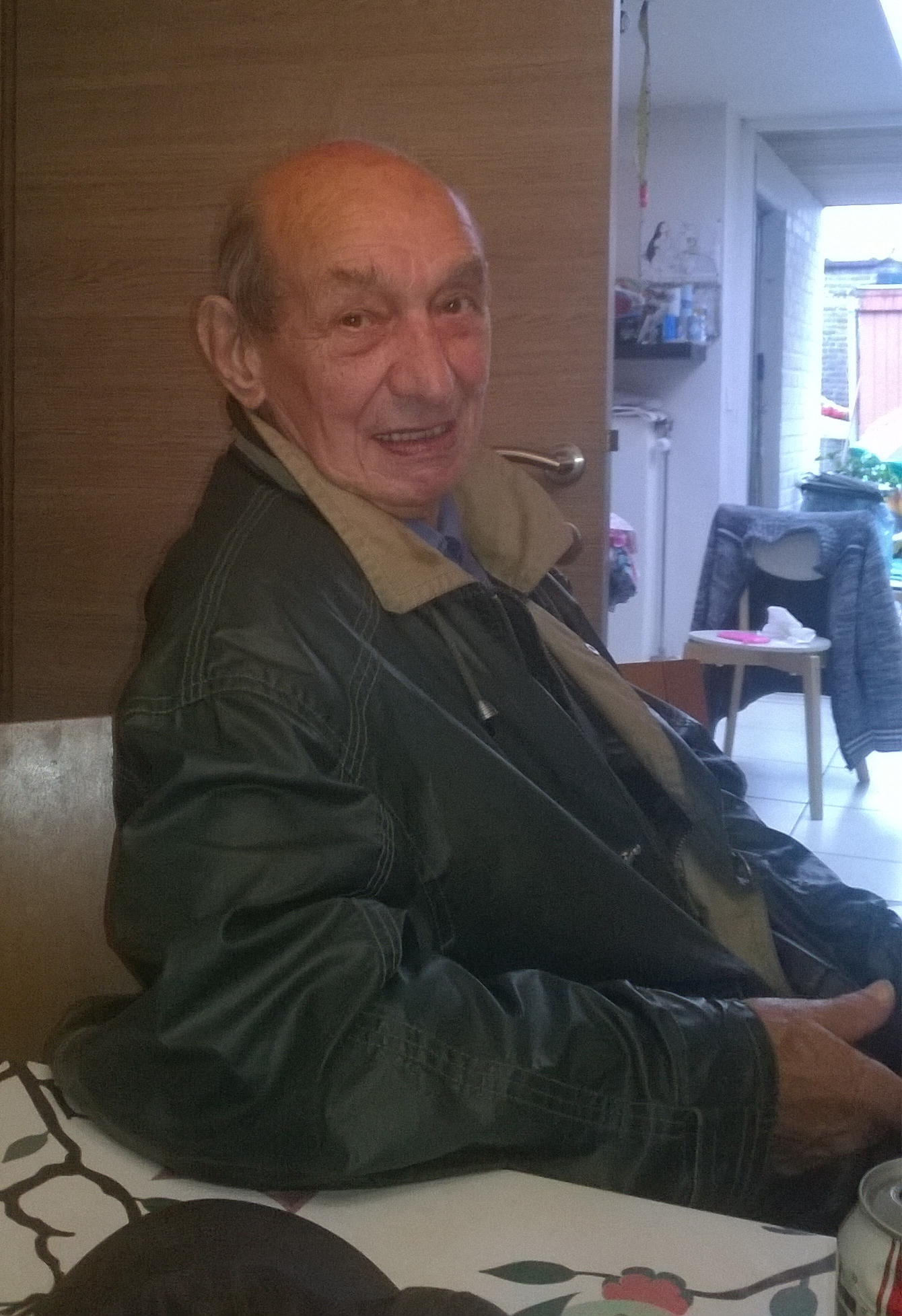

Personal information
- Born: 17 August 1936 Deinze, Belgium
- Died: 12 January 2023 (aged 86)

Cycling career
- Sport: Cycling
- Current team: Retired
- Discipline: Road
- Role: Rider

Professional teams
- 1959: Groene Leeuw-Sinalco-SAS
- 1960: Helyett-Leroux
- 1961: Alcyon-Leroux
- 1962: Gitane-Leroux-Dunlop
- 1963: Solo-Terrot
- 1964–1966: Solo-Superia
- 1967–1969: Willem II-Gazelle

Henri De Wolf (17 August 1936 – 12 January 2023) was a Belgian cyclist.

== Major results ==
1959
1st Stage 9 Peace Race
1960
3rd Kuurne-Brussels-Kuurne
5th Tour of Flanders
5th Paris–Roubaix
8th Liège–Bastogne–Liège
1961
1st Stage 7 Critérium du Dauphiné Libéré
2nd GP Isbergues
2nd Grote Prijs Stad Zottegem
1962
1st La Flèche Wallonne
1st Stage 1a Tour of Belgium
1963
1st Stage 1 Four Days of Dunkirk
1st Druivenkoers Overijse
1st Paris-Valenciennes
1964
1st Stage 10 Vuelta a España
1967
2nd Sassari-Cagliari
