= Jean-Claude Wuillemin =

French cyclist

Personal information
- Born: 22 June 1943 Plougasnou, France
- Died: 2 November 1993 (aged 50) Rouen, France
- Height: 180 cm (5 ft 11 in)

Cycling career
- Sport: Cycling

Jean-Claude Wuillemin (22 June 1943 – 2 November 1993) was a French cyclist. He competed in the team time trial at the 1964 Summer Olympics.
