= Antonio Bertrán =

Spanish cyclist (1933–2008)

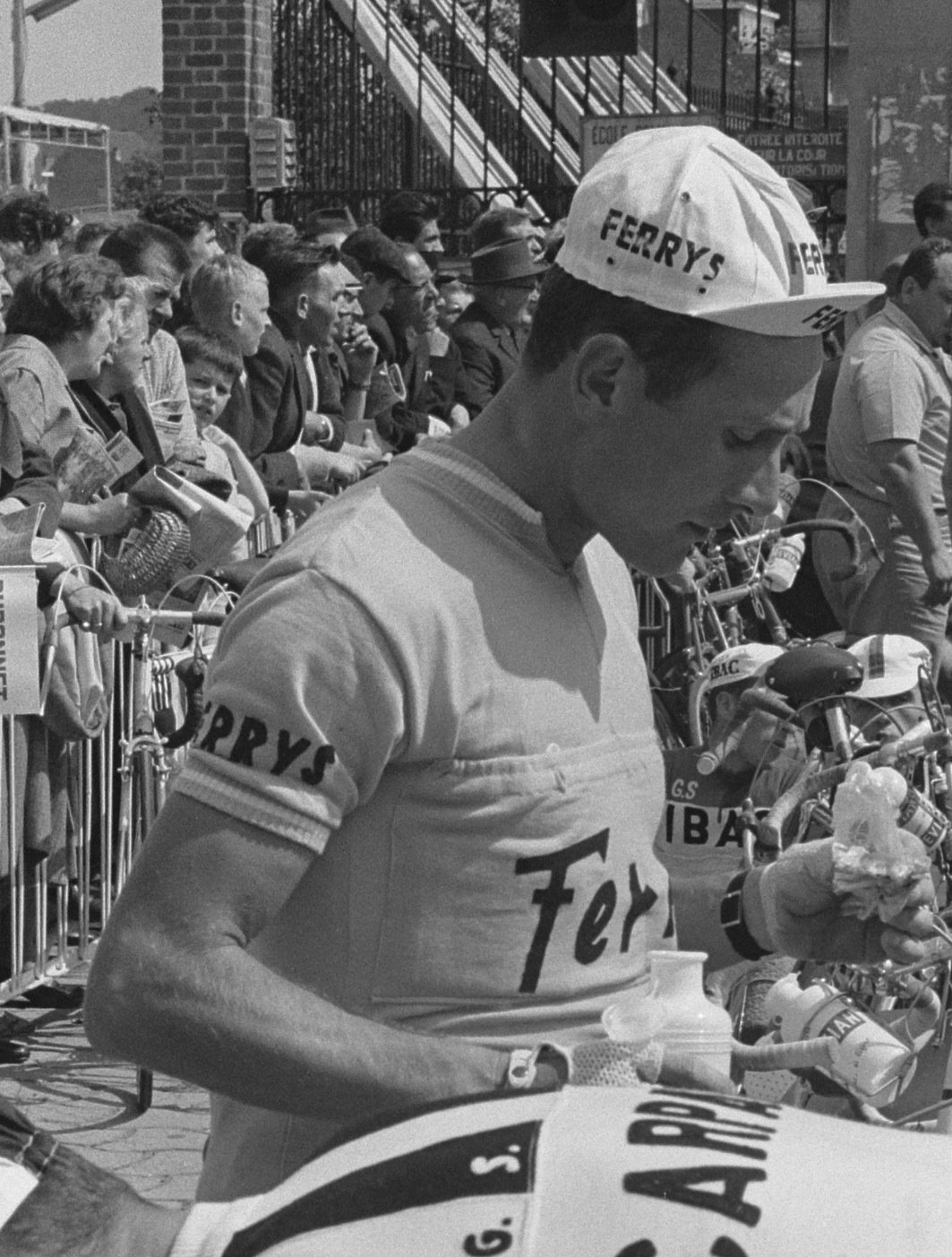
- Bertrán at the 1963 Tour de France

Personal information
- Full name: Antonio Bertrán Panadés
- Born: November 18, 1933 Eibar, Spain
- Died: March 21, 2008 (aged 74) Barcelona, Spain

Cycling career
- Sport: Cycling
- Discipline: Road
- Role: Rider

Professional teams
- 1955: Peña Nicky's
- 1957: Mobylette
- 1958: Lube–NSU
- 1959–1960: Faema–Guerra
- 1961–1966: Ferrys

Antonio Bertrán Panadés (18 November 1933 – 21 March 2008) was a Spanish professional road cyclist.

== Major results ==
1956
2nd Overall Vuelta a la Comunidad Valenciana
2nd Trofeo Masferrer
1958
1st Stage 3 Volta a Catalunya
1959
1st Overall Euskal Bizikleta
1st GP Pascuas
3rd Campeonato Vasco Navarro de Montaña
8th Overall Vuelta a Andalucía
1960
1st Trofeo Jaumendreu
1st Stage 1 Vuelta a Andalucía
1st Stage 5 Vuelta a la Comunidad Valenciana
5th Overall Volta a Catalunya
1961
5th Overall Vuelta a la Comunidad Valenciana

1st Stage 4

1962
2nd Overall Vuelta a la Comunidad Valenciana

1st Stage 1b

3rd Campeonato Vasco Navarro de Montaña
1963
1st Stage 5 Volta a Catalunya
1964
6th Trofeo Masferrer
10th Overall Vuelta a España
1965
1st Trofeo Masferrer
1st Stage 5 Vuelta a la Comunidad Valenciana
2nd Overall Setmana Catalana de Ciclisme

1st Stage 2

1966
1st Stage 4 Vuelta a la Comunidad Valenciana
10th Overall Vuelta a Andalucía

1st Stage 7
