= Gérard Thiélin =

French cyclist

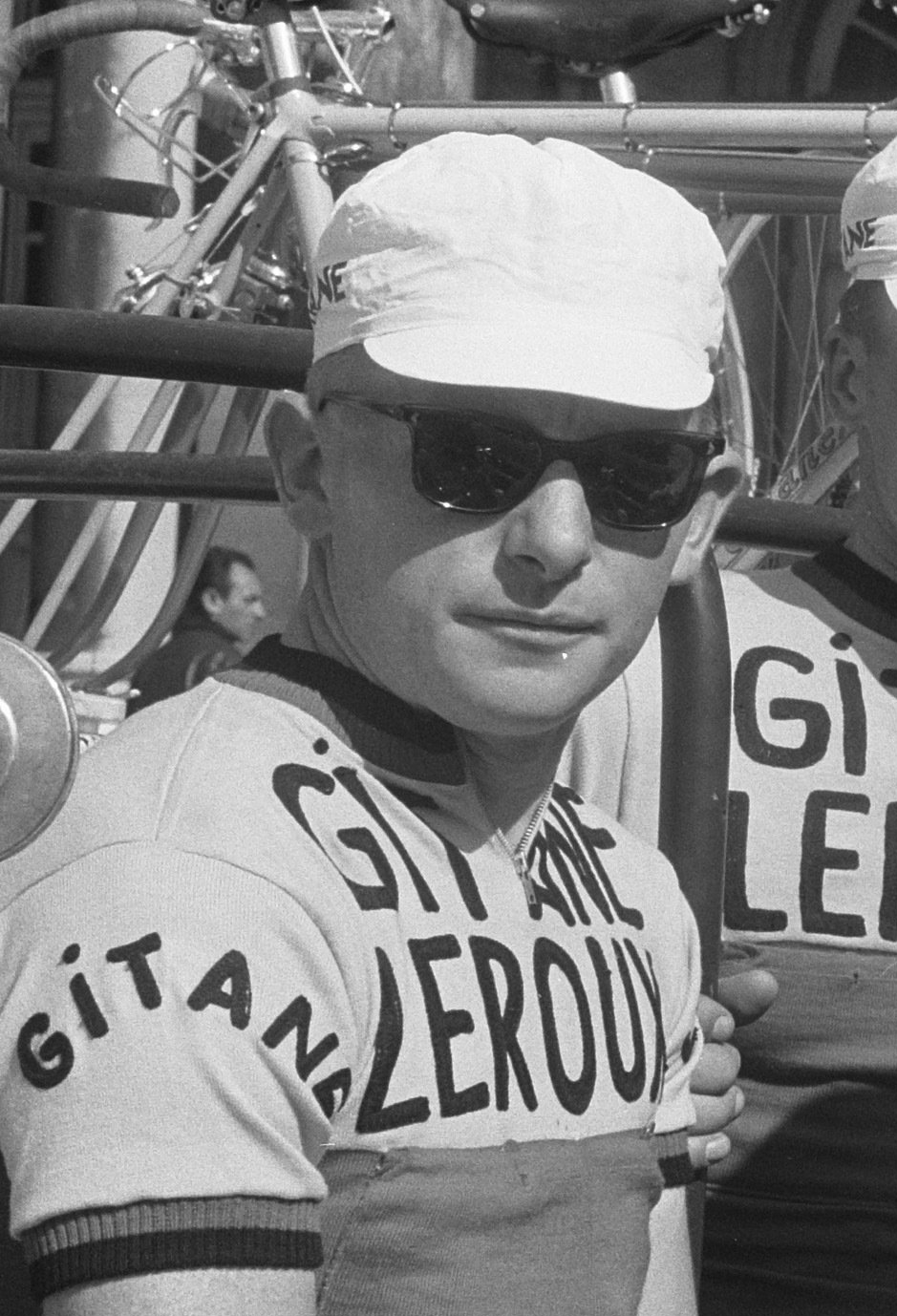
- Thiélin at the 1962 Tour de France

Personal information
- Born: 29 March 1935 Faverolles-sur-Cher, France
- Died: 20 September 2007 (aged 72) Cholet, France

Cycling career
- Sport: Cycling
- Role: Rider

Gérard Thiélin (29 March 1935 – 20 September 2007) was a French professional racing cyclist. He rode in four editions of the Tour de France.
