= José Pérez Francés =

Spanish cyclist (1936–2021)

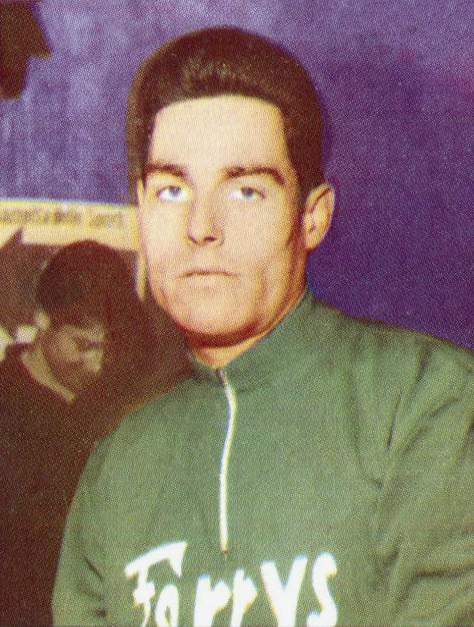
- Pérez Francés c. 1966

Personal information
- Full name: José Pérez Francés
- Born: 27 December 1936 Santander, Spain
- Died: 30 September 2021 (aged 84) Barcelona, Spain

Cycling career
- Sport: Cycling
- Discipline: Road
- Role: Rider

Professional teams
- 1960–1966: Ferrys
- 1967–1968: Kas–Kaskol
- 1969: Bic

Major wins
- Grand Tours Tour de France 1 individual stage (1965) Vuelta a España Points classification (1964) 3 individual stages (1961, 1963, 1968) One-day races and Classics National Road Race Championships (1963)

José Pérez Francés (27 December 1936 – 30 September 2021) was a Spanish professional road racing cyclist. He finished four times on the podium of Vuelta a España and won three stages, although he never won the overall classification. He also finished third in 1963 Tour de France, after Jacques Anquetil and Federico Bahamontes, and won a stage in 1965.

== Major results ==
1955
1st Stage 4a Volta a la Comunitat Valenciana
1957
7th Overall Vuelta a Andalucía
1960
2nd Overall Volta a Catalunya

1st Stages 3a (TTT) & 8

1961
1st Gran Premio Navarra
2nd Circuito Montañés
3rd Overall Vuelta a España

1st Stage 8

5th Overall Volta a Catalunya
7th Overall Tour de France
7th Overall Madrid–Barcelona

1st Stage 6a

8th Overall Volta a la Comunitat Valenciana
1962
2nd Overall Vuelta a España
2nd Road race, National Road Championships
2nd Circuito de Getxo
6th Overall Giro d'Italia
8th Overall Volta a Catalunya

1st Stage 7 (ITT)

1963
1st Road race, National Road Championships
1st Overall Setmana Catalana de Ciclisme
1st Gran Premio Navarra
1st Stage 8 Vuelta a España
1st Stage 8 Volta a la Comunitat Valenciana
2nd Overall Critérium du Dauphiné Libéré

1st Stage 3

3rd Overall Tour de France
4th Trofeo Masferrer
6th Subida a Arrate
1964
1st Overall Setmana Catalana de Ciclisme

1st Stage 1

1st GP Villafranca de Ordizia
Volta a Catalunya

1st Stages 1b & 6

Volta a la Comunitat Valenciana

1st Stages 3 & 7

3rd Overall Vuelta a España

1st Points classification

3rd Gran Premio Navarra
3rd Klasika Primavera
5th Gran Premio Fedrácion Catalana de Ciclismo
9th Barcelona-Andorra
10th Overall Critérium du Dauphiné Libéré
10th Trofeo Masferrer
1965
1st Overall Volta a la Comunitat Valenciana

1st Stages 1 & 7

1st Gran Premio de Primavera
5th Overall Setmana Catalana de Ciclisme

1st Stage 4

6th Overall Tour de France

1st Stage 11

6th Trofeo Masferrer
1966
1st Stage 1 Vuelta a Andalucía
1st Stage 3 Vuelta a La Rioja
3rd Klasika Primavera
9th Overall Volta a Catalunya
1967
1st Overall Volta a la Comunitat Valenciana

1st Stages 2, 3 & 5a

1st Barcelona-Andorra
2nd Trofeo Masferrer
3rd Overall Setmana Catalana de Ciclisme

1st Stage 4

5th Overall Giro d'Italia
6th Overall Volta a Catalunya
10th Overall Vuelta a España
1968
Volta a la Comunitat Valenciana

1st Stages 2 & 4

2nd Overall Vuelta a España

1st Stage 12

3rd GP Pascuas
7th Overall Tour de Suisse
8th Overall Euskal Bizikleta
