= Frans Melckenbeeck =

Belgian cyclist (1940–2025)

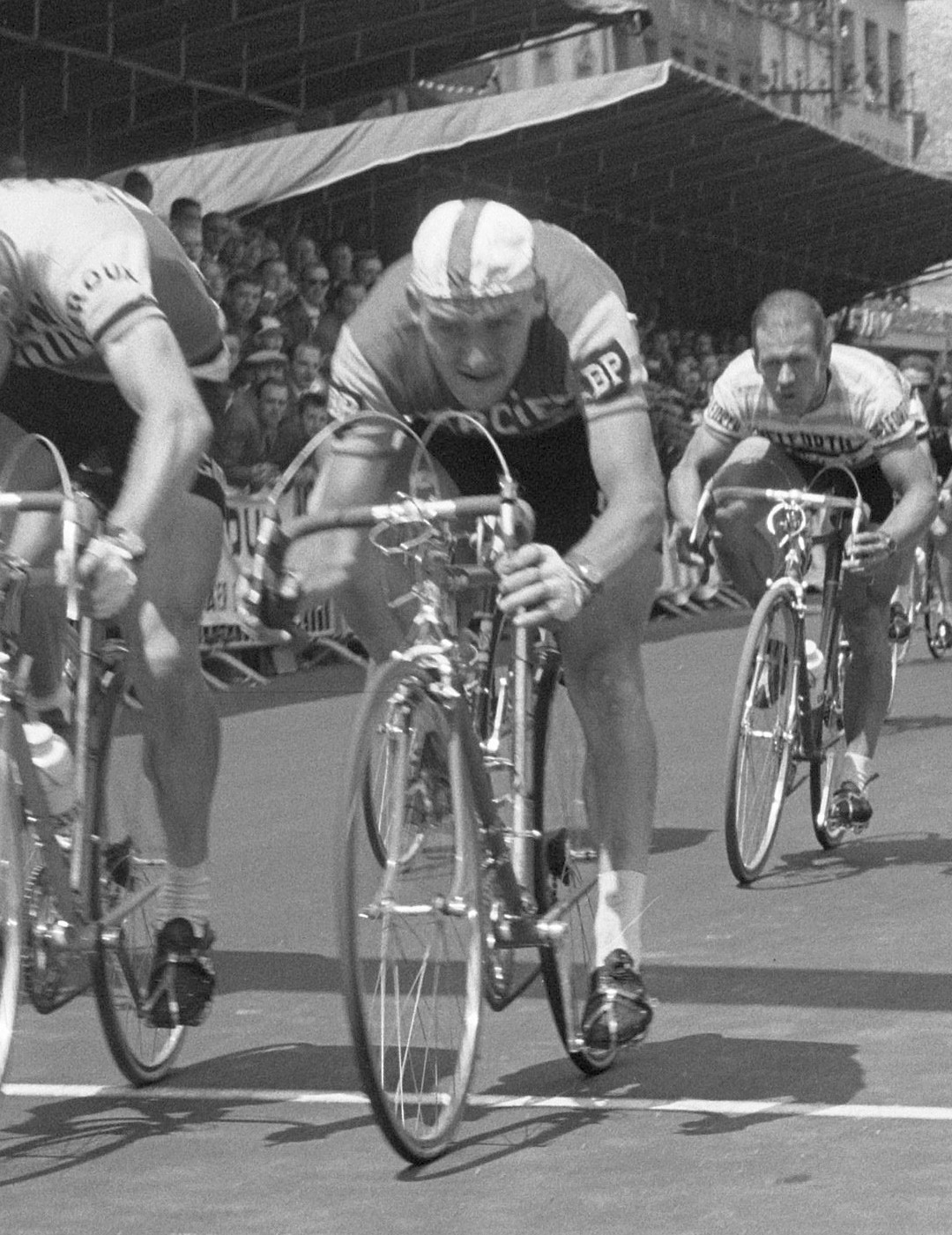
- Melckenbeeck in the 1962 Tour de France

Personal information
- Born: 15 November 1940 Lede, German-occupied Belgium
- Died: 28 October 2025 (aged 84)

Cycling career
- Sport: Cycling
- Discipline: Road
- Role: Rider

Professional teams
- 1962–1966: Mercier–BP–Hutchinson
- 1967–1969: Groene Leeuw–Tibetan–Pull Over Centrale
- 1970–1972: Goldor

Major wins
- Grand Tours Tour de France 1 individual stage (1963) Vuelta a España 4 individual stages (1964, 1965) One-day races and Classics Liège–Bastogne–Liège (1963) Omloop Het Volk (1964) Grand Prix de Fourmies (1964)

Frans Melckenbeeck (15 November 1940 – 28 October 2025) was a Belgian professional road bicycle racer. In 1962, Melckenbeeck won one stage of the Tour de France, and in 1963 he won Liège–Bastogne–Liège. He won four stages in the 1964 and 1965 Vuelta a España. Melckenbeeck also competed in the team pursuit at the 1960 Summer Olympics.

In total, Melckenbeeck collected 240 victories, 64 of which as a professional rider. He also achieved success on the cycling tracks.

A cycling race, the Grand Prix Frans Melckenbeek, is organized every year in his hometown of Lede. In 2018, Melckenbeeck became an honorary citizen of the municipality.

Melckenbeeck died on 28 October 2025, at the age of 84.

== Major results ==
1958
1st Omloop der Vlaamse Gewesten Amateurs race
1st Overall Étoile des Débutants

1st Stages 1, 3 & 4

1960
1st Bruxelles–Lede
1961
5th UCI Road World Championships Amateur road race
1961
1st National Road Race Championships Road race, amateurs
1st National Track Championships Madison, amateurs
1st Overall Ronde van Limburg (for under age 26)
2nd Overall Tour of Belgium amateurs

1st Stages 5 & 6

1st Overall Tour du Berry

1st Stages 2 & 3 (ITT)

1st Paris–Vailly
1st Kampioenschap van Oost-Vlaanderen
1st Grand Prix Somalia
2nd Grand Prix Neuville
2nd Gent–Wevelgem Amateurs
1962
1st Schelde-Dender-Leie
1st Lede
1st Mere
1st Stage 1 Tour de Luxembourg
1st Stage 5 Four Days of Dunkirk
1st Mol
2nd Paris–Tours
2nd Berlare
3rd Overall Tour du Nord

1st Stage 2

3rd Gullegem Koerse
1963
Tour de France:

1st Stage 4

1st Stage 2 Tour du Nord
1st Liège–Bastogne–Liège
1st GP Brasschaat
1st GP Gemeente Kortemark
1st Omloop Gemeente Melle
1st Stage 5 Four Days of Dunkirk
1st Grote 1-MeiPrijs
1st Stages 2, 4 & 7 Tour du Sud-Est
1st GP Roeselare
1st Provencial interclub championship
1st Aalst
1st Lede
1st Ninove
1st GP Gemeente Kortemark
2nd Tour of Flanders
2nd Schelde-Dender-Leie
2nd Boucles de l'Aulne
2nd National Road Race Championships Interclubs Road race
3rd Kampioenschap van Vlaanderen
3rd Schaal Sels
1964
1st Grand Prix de Fourmies
1st Stage 1 Tour de Picardie
1st Grand Prix d'Isbergues
1st Omloop Het Volk
1st GP Gemeente Kortemark
1st Lede
1st Grote Prijs Marcel Kint
Vuelta a España

1st stages 3, 6 and 17

1st Omloop Het Volk
1st GP Roeselare
1st Stage 4 Paris–Nice
1st Temse
1st Zwevegem
1st Lede
1st Kortemark
2nd Schelde-Dender-Leie
2nd Grand Prix d'Aix-en-Provence
2nd Grand Prix de Saint-Raphaël
3rd National Road Race Championships Road race
3rd Kuurne–Brussels–Kuurne
1965
Vuelta a España:

1st Stage 10a

1st GP Monaco
1st Erembodegem-Terjoden
1966
1st Omloop van de Vlasstreek
1st Omloop Gemeente Melle
1st Stage 4 (TTT) Tour of Belgium
2nd Omloop van het Waasland
1967
1st Stages 3 & 4 (TTT) Tour of Belgium
1st Provencial interclub championship
1st Westouter
1968
1st Grote Prijs Stad Zottegem
1st Erembodegem-Terjoden
1st Herzele
1st Handzame
1969
1st Lede
1st Moorsele
1970
1st Roubaix-Cassel-Roubaix
1971
1st Omloop van Oost-Vlaanderen
1st Temse
3rd Schelde-Dender-Leie
1972
1st Ninove
