= Ferrys (cycling team) =

Spanish cycling team (1960–1968)

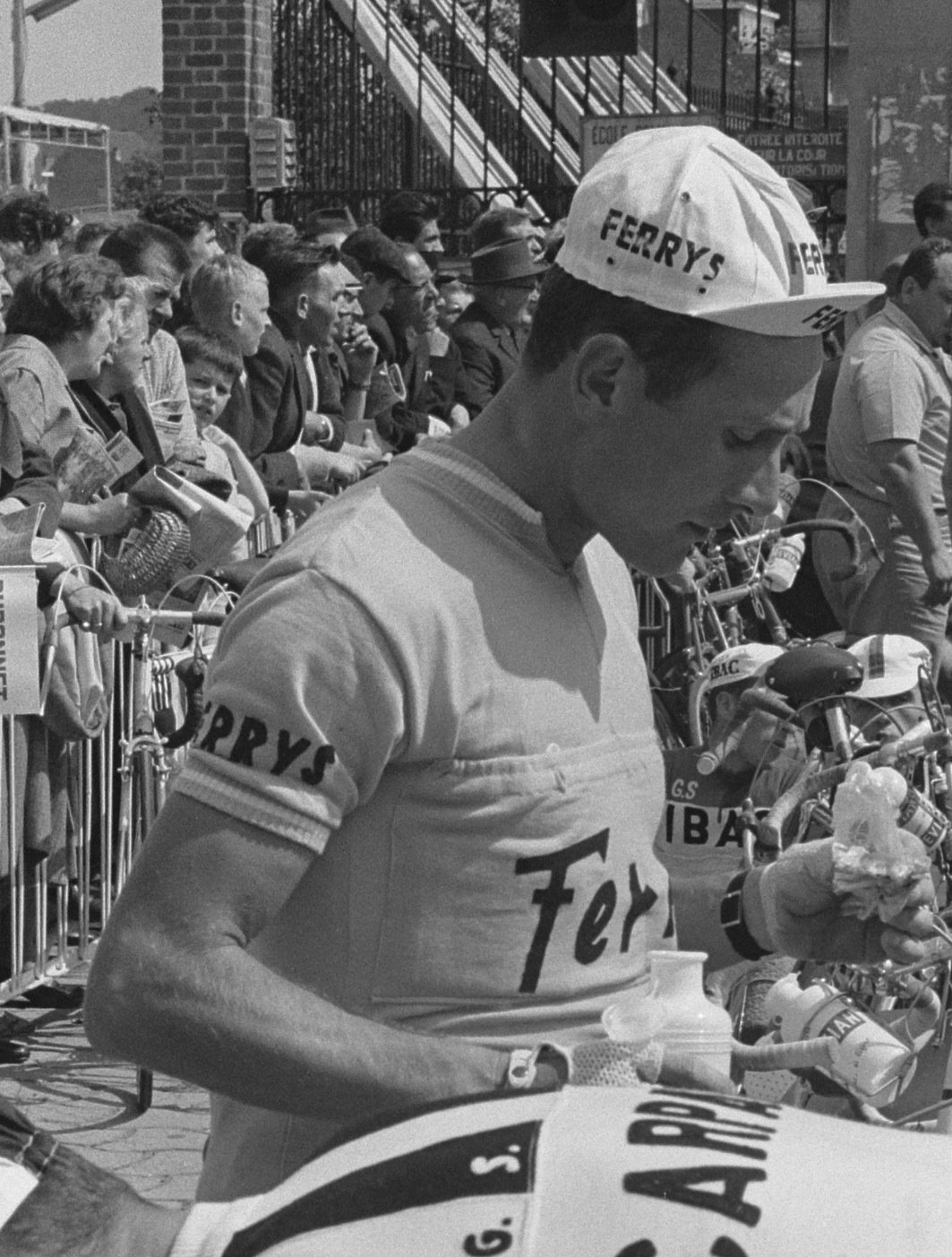
- A Ferrys rider at the 1963 Tour de France

Team information
- Registered: Spain
- Founded: 1960
- Disbanded: 1968
- Discipline: Road

Team name history
- 1960–1968: Ferrys

Ferrys was a Spanish professional cycling team that existed from 1960 to 1968.
