= List of teams and cyclists in the 1963 Vuelta a España =

For the 1963 Vuelta a España, the field consisted of 90 riders; 65 finished the race.

== By rider ==
Legend
No.	Starting number worn by the rider during the Vuelta
Pos.	Position in the general classification
Time	Deficit to the winner of the general classification
DNF	Denotes a rider who did not finish

No.	Name	Nationality	Team	Pos.	Time	Ref
1	Jean Stablinski	France	Saint-Raphaël	9	+ 9' 31"	
2	Jacques Anquetil	France	Saint-Raphaël	1	64h 46' 20"	
3	Seamus Elliott	Ireland	Saint-Raphaël	41	+ 1h 02' 14"	
4	Guy Ignolin	France	Saint-Raphaël	38	+ 59' 09"	
5	Bas Maliepaard	Netherlands	Saint-Raphaël	4	+ 5' 06"	
6	Anatole Novak	France	Saint-Raphaël	19	+ 28' 35"	
7	Gérard Thiélin	France	Saint-Raphaël	17	+ 28' 01"	
8	François Le Her	France	Saint-Raphaël	39	+ 1h 00' 00"	
9	Jacques Simon	France	Saint-Raphaël	DNF	—	
10	Abel Le Dudal	France	Saint-Raphaël	63	+ 2h 13' 11"	
11	Vincenzo Meco	Italy	San Pellegrino	DNF	—	
12	Aldo Moser	Italy	San Pellegrino	DNF	—	
13	Giorgio Zancanaro	Italy	San Pellegrino	DNF	—	
14	Ernesto Bono	Italy	San Pellegrino	53	+ 1h 32' 04"	
15	Alberto Marzaioli	Italy	San Pellegrino	DNF	—	
16	Guido Giusti	Italy	San Pellegrino	DNF	—	
17	Nunzio Pellicciari	Italy	San Pellegrino	DNF	—	
18	Celso Gambi	Italy	San Pellegrino	60	+ 1h 50' 43"	
19	Giovanni Castelletti	Italy	San Pellegrino	DNF	—	
20	Lorenzo Carminati	Italy	San Pellegrino	DNF	—	
21	Francisco Gabica	Spain	Kas	5	+ 7' 57"	
22	Eusebio Vélez	Spain	Kas	7	+ 8' 34"	
23	Antonio Barrutia	Spain	Kas	11	+ 13' 45"	
24	Miguel Pacheco	Spain	Kas	3	+ 3' 32"	
25	José Antonio Momeñe	Spain	Kas	16	+ 27' 24"	
26	Carlos Echeverria	Spain	Kas	25	+ 36' 26"	
27	Sebastián Elorza	Spain	Kas	20	+ 31' 54"	
28	Valentín Uriona	Spain	Kas	18	+ 28' 21"	
29	Manuel Martin Pinera	Spain	Kas	30	+ 44' 21"	
30	José Urrestarazu	Spain	Kas	26	+ 38' 25"	
31	Edgard Sorgeloos	Belgium	GBC-Libertas	15	+ 26' 00"	
32	Willy Schroeders	Belgium	GBC-Libertas	48	+ 1h 12' 23"	
33	Martin Van Geneugden	Belgium	GBC-Libertas	46	+ 1h 10' 15"	
34	Roger Baens	Belgium	GBC-Libertas	22	+ 32' 29"	
35	Frans Aerenhouts	Belgium	GBC-Libertas	12	+ 16' 09"	
36	Guillaume Van Tongerloo	Belgium	GBC-Libertas	10	+ 10' 48"	
37	Frans Van Immerseel	Belgium	GBC-Libertas	49	+ 1h 14' 44"	
38	Willy Derboven	Belgium	GBC-Libertas	42	+ 1h 05' 02"	
39	Jan Lauwers	Belgium	GBC-Libertas	52	+ 1h 21' 30"	
40	Adolf De Waele	Belgium	GBC-Libertas	DNF	—	
41	Dieter Puschel	West Germany	Ruberg	21	+ 32' 01"	
42	Willy Schuller	West Germany	Ruberg	DNF	—	
43	Jesús Galdeano	Spain	Ruberg	54	+ 1h 35' 48"	
44	Heinz Theisen	West Germany	Ruberg	DNF	—	
45	Rolf Roggendorf	West Germany	Ruberg	DNF	—	
46	Roger Thull	Luxembourg	Ruberg	62	+ 2h 12' 28"	
47	Albert Van D'Huynslager	Belgium	Ruberg	57	+ 1h 47' 00"	
48	Bruno Martinato	Luxembourg	Ruberg	64	+ 2h 34' 38"	
49	Leopold Rosseel	Belgium	Ruberg	65	+ 3h 03' 51"	
50	Josef Borghard	West Germany	Ruberg	DNF	—	
51	José Pérez Francés	Spain	Ferrys	DNF	—	
52	Fernando Manzaneque	Spain	Ferrys	13	+ 16' 30"	
53	Antonio Karmany	Spain	Ferrys	14	+ 24' 45"	
54	Gabriel Mas	Spain	Ferrys	DNF	—	
55	Rogelio Hernández Santibáñez	Spain	Ferrys	29	+ 40' 41"	
56	Esteban Martín Jiménez	Spain	Ferrys	24	+ 35' 22"	
57	José Suria Cutrina	Spain	Ferrys	DNF	—	
58	Raúl Rey Fomosel	Spain	Ferrys	56	+ 1h 42' 46"	
59	Antonio Bertrán	Spain	Ferrys	45	+ 1h 09' 24"	
60	Julio San Emeterio	Spain	Ferrys	43	+ 1h 07' 55"	
61	Mário Silva	Portugal	Portugal	34	+ 49' 47"	
62	João Henrique Roque dos Santos	Portugal	Portugal	32	+ 45' 34"	
63	Agostinho Correia	Portugal	Portugal	44	+ 1h 08' 31"	
64	Joao Alves	Portugal	Portugal	50	+ 1h 16' 55"	
65	Indalecio De Jesus	Portugal	Portugal	55	+ 1h 36' 15"	
66	Jorge Corvo	Portugal	Portugal	35	+ 56' 01"	
67	José Pinto	Portugal	Portugal	DNF	—	
68	José Alfonso Rodrigo Alcino	Portugal	Portugal	59	+ 1h 49' 02"	
69	Laurentino Mendes	Portugal	Portugal	61	+ 2h 08' 57"	
70	Francisco Marinho	Portugal	Portugal	DNF	—	
71	Jaime Alomar	Spain	Pinturas Ega	33	+ 46' 54"	
72	José Bernárdez	Spain	Pinturas Ega	DNF	—	
73	Juan Jorge Nicolau Moria	Spain	Pinturas Ega	58	+ 1h 48' 51"	
74	Antonio Carreras	Spain	Pinturas Ega	37	+ 58' 01"	
75	Salvador Honrubia Manonelles	Spain	Pinturas Ega	47	+ 1h 10' 40"	
76	Antonio Blanco Martínez	Spain	Pinturas Ega	DNF	—	
77	José Martínez	Spain	Pinturas Ega	DNF	—	
78	Julio Sanz	Spain	Pinturas Ega	27	+ 39' 16"	
79	Marcel Queheille	France	Pinturas Ega	DNF	—	
80	René Abadie	France	Pinturas Ega	DNF	—	
81	José Martín Colmenarejo	Spain	Faema	2	+ 3' 06"	
82	Antonio Suárez	Spain	Faema	6	+ 8' 13"	
83	Antonio Gómez del Moral	Spain	Faema	8	+ 9' 10"	
84	Julio Jiménez	Spain	Faema	23	+ 33' 50"	
85	José Manuel Quesada Nortes	Spain	Faema	28	+ 40' 10"	
86	José Segú	Spain	Faema	31	+ 45' 24"	
87	Juan Sánchez	Spain	Faema	36	+ 57' 40"	
88	Francisco José Suñé Montragull	Spain	Faema	40	+ 1h 00' 01"	
89	José Gómez del Moral	Spain	Faema	51	+ 1h 19' 46"	
90	Luis Mayoral Rubin	Spain	Faema	DNF	—	
