= List of teams and cyclists in the 1964 Tour de France =

List of cyclists

The 1964 Tour de France started with 132 cyclists, divided into 12 teams of 11 cyclists:

- Saint-Raphaël–Gitane–Campagnolo
- Mercier–BP–Hutchinson
- Peugeot–BP–Englebert
- Pelforth–Sauvage–Lejeune–Wolber
- Margnat–Paloma–Dunlop
- Wiel's–Groene Leeuw
- Solo–Superia
- Flandria–Romeo
- Ferrys
- Kas–Kaskol
- Salvarani
- Televizier

The main favourite was defending champion Jacques Anquetil. He had won the 1964 Giro d'Italia earlier that year, and was trying to win a Tour-Giro double, which at that moment had only been done by Fausto Coppi.

== Start list ==
=== By team ===
Saint-Raphaël–Gitane–Campagnolo
No.	Rider	Pos.
1	Jacques Anquetil (FRA)	1
2	Rudi Altig (FRG)	15
3	Jo de Roo (NED)	43
4	Seamus Elliott (IRL)	DNF
5	Pierre Everaert (FRA)	63
6	Albertus Geldermans (NED)	38
7	Jean-Claude Lebaube (FRA)	DNF
8	Anatole Novak (FRA)	81
9	Louis Rostollan (FRA)	22
10	Jean Stablinski (FRA)	35
11	André Zimmermann (FRA)	36

Mercier–BP–Hutchinson
No.	Rider	Pos.
12	Frans Aerenhouts (BEL)	75
13	Robert Cazala (FRA)	59
14	Jean Gainche (FRA)	31
15	Jean-Pierre Genet (BEL)	78
16	Barry Hoban (GBR)	65
17	André Le Dissez (FRA)	DNF
18	Frans Melckenbeeck (BEL)	DNF
19	Raymond Poulidor (FRA)	2
20	Robert Poulot (FRA)	47
21	Victor Van Schil (BEL)	32
22	Paul Vermeulen (FRA)	29

Peugeot–BP–Englebert
No.	Rider	Pos.
23	Ferdinand Bracke (BEL)	DNF
24	Henri Duez (FRA)	18
25	François Hamon (FRA)	71
26	Pierre Le Mellec (FRA)	DNF
27	Camille Le Menn (FRA)	69
28	Raymond Mastrotto (FRA)	28
29	Emile Daems (BEL)	DNF
30	Michel Nédélec (FRA)	DNF
31	Guy Seyve (BEL)	DNF
32	Tom Simpson (GBR)	14
33	Georges Van Coningsloo (BEL)	DNF

Pelforth–Sauvage–Lejeune–Wolber
No.	Rider	Pos.
34	Henry Anglade (FRA)	4
35	Édouard Delberghe (BEL)	51
36	Guy Epaud (FRA)	34
37	Hubert Ferrer (FRA)	54
38	André Foucher (FRA)	6
39	Georges Groussard (FRA)	5
40	Joseph Groussard (FRA)	74
41	Jan Janssen (NED)	24
42	Jean-Claude Lefebvre (FRA)	DNF
43	François Mahé (FRA)	DNF
44	Willy Monty (BEL)	30

Margnat–Paloma–Dunlop
No.	Rider	Pos.
45	Jean Anastasi (FRA)	DNF
46	Federico Bahamontes (ESP)	3
47	André Darrigade (FRA)	67
48	Jacques Gestraut (FRA)	DNF
49	Jean Graczyk (FRA)	76
50	Esteban Martín (ESP)	11
51	Claude Mattio (FRA)	27
52	Jean Milesi (FRA)	77
53	Joseph Novales (FRA)	19
54	Eddy Pauwels (BEL)	20
55	José Segú (ESP)	45

Wiel's–Groene Leeuw
No.	Rider	Pos.
56	Benoni Beheyt (BEL)	49
57	Jean-Baptiste Claes (BEL)	79
58	Gilbert Desmet (BEL)	8
59	Gilbert De Smet (BEL)	40
60	Hans Junkermann (FRG)	9
61	Karl-Heinz Kunde (FRG)	16
62	Yvo Molenaers (BEL)	DNF
63	Jozef Timmerman (BEL)	DNF
64	René Van Meenen (BEL)	DNF
65	Frans Verbeeck (BEL)	DNF
66	Michael Wright (GBR)	56

Solo–Superia
No.	Rider	Pos.
67	Arthur Decabooter (BEL)	DNF
68	Vin Denson (GBR)	72
69	Willy Derboven (BEL)	68
70	Armand Desmet (BEL)	DNF
71	Henri De Wolf (BEL)	DNF
72	Louis Proost (BEL)	DNF
73	Edward Sels (BEL)	33
74	Edgard Sorgeloos (BEL)	61
75	Michel Van Aerde (BEL)	58
76	Bernard Van de Kerckhove (BEL)	57
77	Rik Van Looy (BEL)	DNF

Flandria–Romeo
No.	Rider	Pos.
78	Willy Bocklant (BEL)	DNF
79	Walter Boucquet (BEL)	DNF
80	Frans Brands (BEL)	70
81	Jos Hoevenaers (BEL)	DNF
82	Marcel Ongenae (BEL)	DNF
83	Jef Planckaert (BEL)	DNF
84	Clément Roman (BEL)	DNF
85	Willy Vannitsen (BEL)	DNF
86	Guillaume Van Tongerloo (BEL)	53
87	Kamiel Vyncke (BEL)	42
88	Huub Zilverberg (NED)	37

Ferrys
No.	Rider	Pos.
89	José Bernárdez (ESP)	DNF
90	Antonio Bertrán (ESP)	55
91	Rogelio Hernández (ESP)	26
92	Salvador Honrubia (ESP)	80
93	Fernando Manzaneque (ESP)	12
94	Gabriel Mas (ESP)	DNF
95	Luis Otaño (ESP)	44
96	Miguel Pacheco (ESP)	DNF
97	José Pérez Francés (ESP)	DNF
98	Raúl Rey (ESP)	DNF
99	Francisco Suñé (ESP)	DNF

Kas–Kaskol
No.	Rider	Pos.
100	Antonio Barrutia (ESP)	73
101	Sebastián Elorza (ESP)	23
102	Carlos Echeverría (ESP)	DNF
103	Francisco Gabica (ESP)	13
104	Julio Jiménez (ESP)	7
105	José Antonio Momeñe (ESP)	DNF
106	Manuel Martín Piñera (ESP)	52
107	Joaquim Galera (ESP)	17
108	Juan María Uribezubia (ESP)	41
109	Valentín Uriona (ESP)	DNF
110	Eusebio Vélez (ESP)	DNF

Salvarani
No.	Rider	Pos.
111	Vittorio Adorni (ITA)	10
112	Battista Babini (ITA)	25
113	Ercole Baldini (ITA)	DNF
114	Bruno Fantinato (ITA)	48
115	Antonio Franchi (ITA)	46
116	Italo Mazzacurati (ITA)	50
117	Mario Minieri (ITA)	62
118	Arnaldo Pambianco (ITA)	21
119	Romano Piancastelli (ITA)	DNF
120	Pietro Scandelli (ITA)	DNF
121	Vito Taccone (ITA)	DNF

Televizier
No.	Rider	Pos.
122	Piet Damen (NED)	DNF
123	Jo de Haan (NED)	60
124	Cees Haast (NED)	39
125	Alfons Steuten (NED)	DNF
126	Henk Nijdam (NED)	66
127	André van Aert (NED)	DNF
128	Jacques van der Klundert (NED)	DNF
129	Leo van Dongen (NED)	DNF
130	Cees van Espen (NED)	DNF
131	Piet van Est (NED)	DNF
132	Rik Wouters (NED)	64

=== By rider ===
Legend
No.	Starting number worn by the rider during the Tour
Pos.	Position in the general classification
DNF	Denotes a rider who did not finish

No.	Name	Nationality	Team	Pos.	Ref
1	Jacques Anquetil	France	Saint-Raphaël–Gitane–Campagnolo	1	
2	Rudi Altig	West Germany	Saint-Raphaël–Gitane–Campagnolo	15	
3	Jo de Roo	Netherlands	Saint-Raphaël–Gitane–Campagnolo	43	
4	Seamus Elliott	Ireland	Saint-Raphaël–Gitane–Campagnolo	DNF	
5	Pierre Everaert	France	Saint-Raphaël–Gitane–Campagnolo	63	
6	Albertus Geldermans	Netherlands	Saint-Raphaël–Gitane–Campagnolo	38	
7	Jean-Claude Lebaube	France	Saint-Raphaël–Gitane–Campagnolo	DNF	
8	Anatole Novak	France	Saint-Raphaël–Gitane–Campagnolo	81	
9	Louis Rostollan	France	Saint-Raphaël–Gitane–Campagnolo	22	
10	Jean Stablinski	France	Saint-Raphaël–Gitane–Campagnolo	35	
11	André Zimmermann	France	Saint-Raphaël–Gitane–Campagnolo	36	
12	Frans Aerenhouts	Belgium	Mercier–BP–Hutchinson	75	
13	Robert Cazala	France	Mercier–BP–Hutchinson	59	
14	Jean Gainche	France	Mercier–BP–Hutchinson	31	
15	Jean-Pierre Genet	Belgium	Mercier–BP–Hutchinson	78	
16	Barry Hoban	Great Britain	Mercier–BP–Hutchinson	65	
17	André Le Dissez	France	Mercier–BP–Hutchinson	DNF	
18	Frans Melckenbeeck	Belgium	Mercier–BP–Hutchinson	DNF	
19	Raymond Poulidor	France	Mercier–BP–Hutchinson	2	
20	Robert Poulot	France	Mercier–BP–Hutchinson	47	
21	Victor Van Schil	Belgium	Mercier–BP–Hutchinson	32	
22	Paul Vermeulen	France	Mercier–BP–Hutchinson	29	
23	Ferdinand Bracke	Belgium	Peugeot–BP–Englebert	DNF	
24	Henri Duez	France	Peugeot–BP–Englebert	18	
25	François Hamon	France	Peugeot–BP–Englebert	71	
26	Pierre Le Mellec	France	Peugeot–BP–Englebert	DNF	
27	Camille Le Menn	France	Peugeot–BP–Englebert	69	
28	Raymond Mastrotto	France	Peugeot–BP–Englebert	28	
29	Emile Daems	Belgium	Peugeot–BP–Englebert	DNF	
30	Michel Nédélec	France	Peugeot–BP–Englebert	DNF	
31	Guy Seyve	Belgium	Peugeot–BP–Englebert	DNF	
32	Tom Simpson	Great Britain	Peugeot–BP–Englebert	14	
33	Georges Van Coningsloo	Belgium	Peugeot–BP–Englebert	DNF	
34	Henry Anglade	France	Pelforth–Sauvage–Lejeune–Wolber	4	
35	Édouard Delberghe	Belgium	Pelforth–Sauvage–Lejeune–Wolber	51	
36	Guy Epaud	France	Pelforth–Sauvage–Lejeune–Wolber	34	
37	Hubert Ferrer	France	Pelforth–Sauvage–Lejeune–Wolber	54	
38	André Foucher	France	Pelforth–Sauvage–Lejeune–Wolber	6	
39	Georges Groussard	France	Pelforth–Sauvage–Lejeune–Wolber	5	
40	Joseph Groussard	France	Pelforth–Sauvage–Lejeune–Wolber	74	
41	Jan Janssen	Netherlands	Pelforth–Sauvage–Lejeune–Wolber	24	
42	Jean-Claude Lefebvre	France	Pelforth–Sauvage–Lejeune–Wolber	DNF	
43	François Mahé	France	Pelforth–Sauvage–Lejeune–Wolber	DNF	
44	Willy Monty	Belgium	Pelforth–Sauvage–Lejeune–Wolber	30	
45	Jean Anastasi	France	Margnat–Paloma–Dunlop	DNF	
46	Federico Bahamontes	Spain	Margnat–Paloma–Dunlop	3	
47	André Darrigade	France	Margnat–Paloma–Dunlop	67	
48	Jacques Gestraut	France	Margnat–Paloma–Dunlop	DNF	
49	Jean Graczyk	France	Margnat–Paloma–Dunlop	76	
50	Esteban Martín	Spain	Margnat–Paloma–Dunlop	11	
51	Claude Mattio	France	Margnat–Paloma–Dunlop	27	
52	Jean Milesi	France	Margnat–Paloma–Dunlop	77	
53	Joseph Novales	France	Margnat–Paloma–Dunlop	19	
54	Eddy Pauwels	Belgium	Margnat–Paloma–Dunlop	20	
55	José Segú	Spain	Margnat–Paloma–Dunlop	45	
56	Benoni Beheyt	Belgium	Wiel's–Groene Leeuw	49	
57	Jean-Baptiste Claes	Belgium	Wiel's–Groene Leeuw	79	
58	Gilbert Desmet	Belgium	Wiel's–Groene Leeuw	8	
59	Gilbert De Smet	Belgium	Wiel's–Groene Leeuw	40	
60	Hans Junkermann	West Germany	Wiel's–Groene Leeuw	9	
61	Karl-Heinz Kunde	West Germany	Wiel's–Groene Leeuw	16	
62	Yvo Molenaers	Belgium	Wiel's–Groene Leeuw	DNF	
63	Jozef Timmerman	Belgium	Wiel's–Groene Leeuw	DNF	
64	René Van Meenen	Belgium	Wiel's–Groene Leeuw	DNF	
65	Frans Verbeeck	Belgium	Wiel's–Groene Leeuw	DNF	
66	Michael Wright	Great Britain	Wiel's–Groene Leeuw	56	
67	Arthur Decabooter	Belgium	Solo–Superia	DNF	
68	Vin Denson	Great Britain	Solo–Superia	72	
69	Willy Derboven	Belgium	Solo–Superia	68	
70	Armand Desmet	Belgium	Solo–Superia	DNF	
71	Henri De Wolf	Belgium	Solo–Superia	DNF	
72	Louis Proost	Belgium	Solo–Superia	DNF	
73	Edward Sels	Belgium	Solo–Superia	33	
74	Edgard Sorgeloos	Belgium	Solo–Superia	61	
75	Michel Van Aerde	Belgium	Solo–Superia	58	
76	Bernard Van de Kerckhove	Belgium	Solo–Superia	57	
77	Rik Van Looy	Belgium	Solo–Superia	DNF	
78	Willy Bocklant	Belgium	Flandria–Romeo	DNF	
79	Walter Boucquet	Belgium	Flandria–Romeo	DNF	
80	Frans Brands	Belgium	Flandria–Romeo	70	
81	Jos Hoevenaers	Belgium	Flandria–Romeo	DNF	
82	Marcel Ongenae	Belgium	Flandria–Romeo	DNF	
83	Jef Planckaert	Belgium	Flandria–Romeo	DNF	
84	Clément Roman	Belgium	Flandria–Romeo	DNF	
85	Willy Vannitsen	Belgium	Flandria–Romeo	DNF	
86	Guillaume Van Tongerloo	Belgium	Flandria–Romeo	53	
87	Camiel Vyncke	Belgium	Flandria–Romeo	42	
88	Huub Zilverberg	Belgium	Flandria–Romeo	37	
89	José Bernárdez	Spain	Ferrys	DNF	
90	Antonio Bertrán	Spain	Ferrys	55	
91	Rogelio Hernández	Spain	Ferrys	26	
92	Salvador Honrubia	Spain	Ferrys	80	
93	Fernando Manzaneque	Spain	Ferrys	12	
94	Gabriel Mas	Spain	Ferrys	DNF	
95	Luis Otaño	Spain	Ferrys	44	
96	Miguel Pacheco	Spain	Ferrys	DNF	
97	José Pérez Francés	Spain	Ferrys	DNF	
98	Raúl Rey	Spain	Ferrys	DNF	
99	Francisco Suñé	Spain	Ferrys	DNF	
100	Antonio Barrutia	Spain	Kas–Kaskol	73	
101	Sebastián Elorza	Spain	Kas–Kaskol	23	
102	Carlos Echeverría	Spain	Kas–Kaskol	DNF	
103	Francisco Gabica	Spain	Kas–Kaskol	13	
104	Julio Jiménez	Spain	Kas–Kaskol	7	
105	José Antonio Momeñe	Spain	Kas–Kaskol	DNF	
106	Manuel Martín Piñera	Spain	Kas–Kaskol	52	
107	Joaquim Galera	Spain	Kas–Kaskol	17	
108	Juan María Uribezubia	Spain	Kas–Kaskol	41	
109	Valentín Uriona	Spain	Kas–Kaskol	DNF	
110	Eusebio Vélez	Spain	Kas–Kaskol	DNF	
111	Vittorio Adorni	Italy	Salvarani	10	
112	Battista Babini	Italy	Salvarani	25	
113	Ercole Baldini	Italy	Salvarani	DNF	
114	Bruno Fantinato	Italy	Salvarani	48	
115	Antonio Franchi	Italy	Salvarani	46	
116	Italo Mazzacurati	Italy	Salvarani	50	
117	Mario Minieri	Italy	Salvarani	62	
118	Arnaldo Pambianco	Italy	Salvarani	21	
119	Romano Piancastelli	Italy	Salvarani	DNF	
120	Pietro Scandelli	Italy	Salvarani	DNF	
121	Vito Taccone	Italy	Salvarani	DNF	
122	Piet Damen	Netherlands	Televizier	DNF	
123	Jo de Haan	Netherlands	Televizier	60	
124	Cees Haast	Netherlands	Televizier	39	
125	Alfons Steuten	Netherlands	Televizier	DNF	
126	Henk Nijdam	Netherlands	Televizier	66	
127	André van Aert	Netherlands	Televizier	DNF	
128	Jacques van der Klundert	Netherlands	Televizier	DNF	
129	Leo van Dongen	Netherlands	Televizier	DNF	
130	Cees van Espen	Netherlands	Televizier	DNF	
131	Piet van Est	Netherlands	Televizier	DNF	
132	Rik Wouters	Netherlands	Televizier	64	
