= 1963 Vuelta a España, Stage 9 to Stage 15 =

Cycling race stages

The 1963 Vuelta a España was the 18th edition of the Vuelta a España, one of cycling's Grand Tours. The Vuelta began in Gijón on 1 May, and Stage 9 occurred on 9 May with a stage from Pamplona. The race finished in Madrid on 15 May.

== Stage 9 ==
9 May 1963 - Pamplona to Zaragoza, 180 km (111.8 mi)

Route:

Stage 9 result

| Rank | Rider | Team | Time |
|---|---|---|---|
| 1 | Roger Baens (BEL) | G.B.C.–Libertas | 3h 55' 20" |
| 2 | Ernesto Bono (ITA) | San Pellegrino–Firte | + 30" |
| 3 | Bas Maliepaard (NED) | Saint-Raphaël–Gitane–R. Geminiani | + 3' 51" |
| 4 | José Segú (ESP) | Flandria–Faema | s.t. |
| 5 | Frans Aerenhouts (BEL) | G.B.C.–Libertas | s.t. |
| 6 | Martin Van Geneugden (BEL) | G.B.C.–Libertas | s.t. |
| 7 | Antonio Suárez (ESP) | Flandria–Faema | s.t. |
| 8 | Jan Lauwers (BEL) | G.B.C.–Libertas | s.t. |
| 9 | Antonio Barrutia (ESP) | Kas–Kaskol | s.t. |
| 10 | José Pérez Francés (ESP) | Ferrys | s.t. |

General classification after stage 9

| Rank | Rider | Team | Time |
|---|---|---|---|
| 1 | Jacques Anquetil (FRA) | Saint-Raphaël–Gitane–R. Geminiani | 39h 19' 13" |
| 2 | José Martín Colmenarejo (ESP) | Flandria–Faema | + 2' 04" |
| 3 | José Pérez Francés (ESP) | Ferrys | + 2' 16" |
| 4 | Antonio Barrutia (ESP) | Kas–Kaskol | + 3' 08" |
| 5 | Bas Maliepaard (NED) | Saint-Raphaël–Gitane–R. Geminiani | + 3' 25" |
| 6 | Miguel Pacheco (ESP) | Kas–Kaskol | + 4' 13" |
| 7 | Fernando Manzaneque (ESP) | Ferrys | + 5' 22" |
| 8 | Francisco Gabica (ESP) | Kas–Kaskol | s.t. |
| 9 | Eusebio Vélez (ESP) | Kas–Kaskol | + 5' 29" |
| 10 | Antonio Karmany (ESP) | Ferrys | + 6' 10" |

== Stage 10 ==
10 May 1963 - Zaragoza to Lleida, 144 km (89.5 mi)

Route:

Stage 10 result

| Rank | Rider | Team | Time |
|---|---|---|---|
| 1 | Jean Stablinski (FRA) | Saint-Raphaël–Gitane–R. Geminiani | 2h 46' 35" |
| 2 | José Martín Colmenarejo (ESP) | Flandria–Faema | + 30" |
| 3 | Edgard Sorgeloos (BEL) | G.B.C.–Libertas | + 1' 01" |
| 4 | Bas Maliepaard (NED) | Saint-Raphaël–Gitane–R. Geminiani | s.t. |
| 5 | Guillaume Van Tongerloo (BEL) | G.B.C.–Libertas | s.t. |
| 6 | José Antonio Momeñe (ESP) | Kas–Kaskol | s.t. |
| 7 | Antonio Suárez (ESP) | Flandria–Faema | s.t. |
| 8 | Francisco Gabica (ESP) | Kas–Kaskol | s.t. |
| 9 | Jacques Anquetil (FRA) | Saint-Raphaël–Gitane–R. Geminiani | s.t. |
| 10 | Anatole Novak (FRA) | Saint-Raphaël–Gitane–R. Geminiani | s.t. |

General classification after stage 10

| Rank | Rider | Team | Time |
|---|---|---|---|
| 1 | Jacques Anquetil (FRA) | Saint-Raphaël–Gitane–R. Geminiani | 42h 06' 49" |
| 2 | José Martín Colmenarejo (ESP) | Flandria–Faema | + 1' 33" |
| 3 | Bas Maliepaard (NED) | Saint-Raphaël–Gitane–R. Geminiani | + 3' 25" |
| 4 | Miguel Pacheco (ESP) | Kas–Kaskol | + 4' 13" |
| 5 | Francisco Gabica (ESP) | Kas–Kaskol | + 5' 22" |
| 6 | Eusebio Vélez (ESP) | Kas–Kaskol | + 5' 29" |
| 7 | José Pérez Francés (ESP) | Ferrys | + 5' 36" |
| 8 | Antonio Gómez del Moral (ESP) | Flandria–Faema | + 6' 41" |
| 9 | Antonio Suárez (ESP) | Flandria–Faema | + 7' 09" |
| 10 | Antonio Barrutia (ESP) | Kas–Kaskol | + 7' 16" |

== Stage 11 ==
11 May 1963 - Lleida to Barcelona, 182 km (113.1 mi)

Route:

Stage 11 result

| Rank | Rider | Team | Time |
|---|---|---|---|
| 1 | Jan Lauwers (BEL) | G.B.C.–Libertas | 4h 17' 43" |
| 2 | Jaime Alomar (ESP) | Pinturas Ega | + 30" |
| 3 | José Antonio Momeñe (ESP) | Kas–Kaskol | + 1' 00" |
| 4 | Edgard Sorgeloos (BEL) | G.B.C.–Libertas | s.t. |
| 5 | Martin Van Geneugden (BEL) | G.B.C.–Libertas | s.t. |
| 6 | Bas Maliepaard (NED) | Saint-Raphaël–Gitane–R. Geminiani | s.t. |
| 7 | Frans Aerenhouts (BEL) | G.B.C.–Libertas | s.t. |
| 8 | Jean Stablinski (FRA) | Saint-Raphaël–Gitane–R. Geminiani | s.t. |
| 9 | Jacques Anquetil (FRA) | Saint-Raphaël–Gitane–R. Geminiani | s.t. |
| 10 | Seamus Elliott (IRL) | Saint-Raphaël–Gitane–R. Geminiani | s.t. |

General classification after stage 11

| Rank | Rider | Team | Time |
|---|---|---|---|
| 1 | Jacques Anquetil (FRA) | Saint-Raphaël–Gitane–R. Geminiani | 46h 25' 32" |
| 2 | José Martín Colmenarejo (ESP) | Flandria–Faema | + 1' 33" |
| 3 | Bas Maliepaard (NED) | Saint-Raphaël–Gitane–R. Geminiani | + 3' 25" |
| 4 | Miguel Pacheco (ESP) | Kas–Kaskol | + 4' 13" |
| 5 | Francisco Gabica (ESP) | Kas–Kaskol | + 5' 22" |
| 6 | Eusebio Vélez (ESP) | Kas–Kaskol | + 5' 29" |
| 7 | José Pérez Francés (ESP) | Ferrys | + 5' 36" |
| 8 | Antonio Gómez del Moral (ESP) | Flandria–Faema | + 6' 41" |
| 9 | Antonio Suárez (ESP) | Flandria–Faema | + 7' 09" |
| 10 | Antonio Barrutia (ESP) | Kas–Kaskol | + 7' 16" |

== Stage 12a ==
12 June 1963 - Barcelona to Barcelona, 80 km (49.7 mi)

Route:

Stage 12a result

| Rank | Rider | Team | Time |
|---|---|---|---|
| 1 | Frans Aerenhouts (BEL) | G.B.C.–Libertas | 1h 59' 16" |
| 2 | Bas Maliepaard (NED) | Saint-Raphaël–Gitane–R. Geminiani | + 15" |
| 3 | Leopold Rosseel (BEL) | Ruberg | + 30" |
| 4 | José Segú (ESP) | Flandria–Faema | s.t. |
| 5 | Frans Van Immerseel (BEL) | G.B.C.–Libertas | s.t. |
| 6 | Valentín Uriona (ESP) | Kas–Kaskol | s.t. |
| 7 | Antonio Gómez del Moral (ESP) | Flandria–Faema | s.t. |
| 8 | Edgard Sorgeloos (BEL) | G.B.C.–Libertas | s.t. |
| 9 | Seamus Elliott (IRL) | Saint-Raphaël–Gitane–R. Geminiani | s.t. |
| 10 | Fernando Manzaneque (ESP) | Ferrys | s.t. |

== Stage 12b ==
12 June 1963 - Sitges to Tarragona, 52 km (32.3 mi) (ITT)

Route:

Stage 12b result

| Rank | Rider | Team | Time |
|---|---|---|---|
| 1 | Miguel Pacheco (ESP) | Kas–Kaskol | 1h 21' 46" |
| 2 | Jacques Anquetil (FRA) | Saint-Raphaël–Gitane–R. Geminiani | + 41" |
| 3 | Antonio Suárez (ESP) | Flandria–Faema | + 1' 45" |
| 4 | José Martín Colmenarejo (ESP) | Flandria–Faema | + 2' 14" |
| 5 | Bas Maliepaard (NED) | Saint-Raphaël–Gitane–R. Geminiani | + 2' 37" |
| 6 | Jean Stablinski (FRA) | Saint-Raphaël–Gitane–R. Geminiani | + 2' 55" |
| 7 | Antonio Gómez del Moral (ESP) | Flandria–Faema | + 3' 10" |
| 8 | Francisco Gabica (ESP) | Kas–Kaskol | + 3' 16" |
| 9 | Guillaume Van Tongerloo (BEL) | G.B.C.–Libertas | + 3' 35" |
| 10 | Eusebio Vélez (ESP) | Kas–Kaskol | + 3' 46" |

General classification after stage 12b

| Rank | Rider | Team | Time |
|---|---|---|---|
| 1 | Jacques Anquetil (FRA) | Saint-Raphaël–Gitane–R. Geminiani | 49h 47' 15" |
| 2 | José Martín Colmenarejo (ESP) | Flandria–Faema | + 3' 36" |
| 3 | Miguel Pacheco (ESP) | Kas–Kaskol | + 4' 02" |
| 4 | Bas Maliepaard (NED) | Saint-Raphaël–Gitane–R. Geminiani | + 5' 36" |
| 5 | Francisco Gabica (ESP) | Kas–Kaskol | + 8' 27" |
| 6 | Antonio Suárez (ESP) | Flandria–Faema | + 8' 43" |
| 7 | Eusebio Vélez (ESP) | Kas–Kaskol | + 9' 04" |
| 8 | José Pérez Francés (ESP) | Ferrys | + 9' 24" |
| 9 | Antonio Gómez del Moral (ESP) | Flandria–Faema | + 9' 40" |
| 10 | Jean Stablinski (FRA) | Saint-Raphaël–Gitane–R. Geminiani | + 10' 01" |

== Stage 13 ==
13 May 1963 - Tarragona to Valencia, 252 km (157 mi)

Route:

Stage 13 result

| Rank | Rider | Team | Time |
|---|---|---|---|
| 1 | Seamus Elliott (IRL) | Saint-Raphaël–Gitane–R. Geminiani | 7h 38' 50" |
| 2 | Sebastián Elorza (ESP) | Kas–Kaskol | + 32" |
| 3 | Antonio Karmany (ESP) | Ferrys | + 1' 02" |
| 4 | Abel Le Dudal (FRA) | Saint-Raphaël–Gitane–R. Geminiani | + 1' 15" |
| 5 | Juan Sánchez (ESP) | Flandria–Faema | s.t. |
| 6 | Willy Schroeders (BEL) | G.B.C.–Libertas | s.t. |
| 7 | Mário Silva (POR) | Portugal | + 2' 23" |
| 8 | José Martínez (ESP) | Pinturas Ega | + 2' 43" |
| 9 | Leopold Rosseel (BEL) | Ruberg | + 2' 57" |
| 10 | Martin Van Geneugden (BEL) | G.B.C.–Libertas | s.t. |

== Stage 14 ==
14 May 1963 - Cuenca to Madrid, 177 km (110 mi)

Route:

Stage 14 result

| Rank | Rider | Team | Time |
|---|---|---|---|
| 1 | Roger Baens (BEL) | G.B.C.–Libertas | 5h 14' 45" |
| 2 | Frans Aerenhouts (BEL) | G.B.C.–Libertas | + 30" |
| 3 | Fernando Manzaneque (ESP) | Ferrys | + 1' 00" |
| 4 | Giovanni Castelletti (ITA) | San Pellegrino–Firte | + 1' 10" |
| 5 | Nunzio Pellicciari (ITA) | San Pellegrino–Firte | + 1' 41" |
| 6 | Guillaume Van Tongerloo (BEL) | G.B.C.–Libertas | s.t. |
| 7 | Edgard Sorgeloos (BEL) | G.B.C.–Libertas | + 1' 44" |
| 8 | Willy Derboven (BEL) | G.B.C.–Libertas | s.t. |
| 9 | Frans Van Immerseel (BEL) | G.B.C.–Libertas | s.t. |
| 10 | Martin Van Geneugden (BEL) | G.B.C.–Libertas | s.t. |

General classification after stage 14

| Rank | Rider | Team | Time |
|---|---|---|---|
| 1 | Jacques Anquetil (FRA) | Saint-Raphaël–Gitane–R. Geminiani | 62h 46' 01" |
| 2 | José Martín Colmenarejo (ESP) | Flandria–Faema | + 3' 06" |
| 3 | Miguel Pacheco (ESP) | Kas–Kaskol | + 3' 31" |
| 4 | Bas Maliepaard (NED) | Saint-Raphaël–Gitane–R. Geminiani | + 5' 06" |
| 5 | Francisco Gabica (ESP) | Kas–Kaskol | + 7' 57" |
| 6 | Antonio Suárez (ESP) | Flandria–Faema | + 8' 13" |
| 7 | Eusebio Vélez (ESP) | Kas–Kaskol | + 8' 34" |
| 8 | Antonio Gómez del Moral (ESP) | Flandria–Faema | + 9' 10" |
| 9 | Jean Stablinski (FRA) | Saint-Raphaël–Gitane–R. Geminiani | + 9' 31" |
| 10 | Guillaume Van Tongerloo (BEL) | G.B.C.–Libertas | + 10' 48" |

== Stage 15 ==
15 May 1963 - Madrid to Madrid, 87 km (54 mi)

Route:

Stage 15 result

| Rank | Rider | Team | Time |
|---|---|---|---|
| 1 | Guy Ignolin (FRA) | Saint-Raphaël–Gitane–R. Geminiani | 1h 58' 12" |
| 2 | Salvador Honrubia Manonelles (ESP) | Pinturas Ega | + 30" |
| 3 | Martin Van Geneugden (BEL) | G.B.C.–Libertas | + 2' 07" |
| 4 | Edgard Sorgeloos (BEL) | G.B.C.–Libertas | s.t. |
| 5 | Frans Aerenhouts (BEL) | G.B.C.–Libertas | s.t. |
| 6 | Celso Gambi (ITA) | San Pellegrino–Firte | s.t. |
| 7 | Valentín Uriona (ESP) | Kas–Kaskol | s.t. |
| 8 | Frans Van Immerseel (BEL) | G.B.C.–Libertas | s.t. |
| 9 | Indalecio De Jesus (POR) | Portugal | s.t. |
| 10 | François Le Her (FRA) | Saint-Raphaël–Gitane–R. Geminiani | s.t. |

General classification after stage 15

| Rank | Rider | Team | Time |
|---|---|---|---|
| 1 | Jacques Anquetil (FRA) | Saint-Raphaël–Gitane–R. Geminiani | 64h 46' 20" |
| 2 | José Martín Colmenarejo (ESP) | Flandria–Faema | + 3' 06" |
| 3 | Miguel Pacheco (ESP) | Kas–Kaskol | + 3' 32" |
| 4 | Bas Maliepaard (NED) | Saint-Raphaël–Gitane–R. Geminiani | + 5' 06" |
| 5 | Francisco Gabica (ESP) | Kas–Kaskol | + 7' 57" |
| 6 | Antonio Suárez (ESP) | Flandria–Faema | + 8' 13" |
| 7 | Eusebio Vélez (ESP) | Kas–Kaskol | + 8' 34" |
| 8 | Antonio Gómez del Moral (ESP) | Flandria–Faema | + 9' 10" |
| 9 | Jean Stablinski (FRA) | Saint-Raphaël–Gitane–R. Geminiani | + 9' 31" |
| 10 | Guillaume Van Tongerloo (BEL) | G.B.C.–Libertas | + 10' 48" |
