= List of teams and cyclists in the 1964 Vuelta a España =

For the 1964 Vuelta a España, the field consisted of 80 riders; 49 finished the race.

== By rider ==
Legend
No.	Starting number worn by the rider during the Vuelta
Pos.	Position in the general classification
Time	Deficit to the winner of the general classification
DNF	Denotes a rider who did not finish

No.	Name	Nationality	Team	Pos.	Time	Ref
1	Sebastián Elorza	Spain	Kas	11	+ 13' 07"	
2	Eusebio Vélez	Spain	Kas	4	+ 2' 04"	
3	Michel Stolker	Netherlands	Kas	DNF	—	
4	José Antonio Momeñe	Spain	Kas	8	+ 9' 31"	
5	Antonio Barrutia	Spain	Kas	32	+ 1h 00' 10"	
6	Julio Jiménez	Spain	Kas	5	+ 3' 16"	
7	Valentín Uriona	Spain	Kas	7	+ 6' 06"	
8	Piet Rentmeester	Netherlands	Kas	DNF	—	
9	Francisco Gabica	Spain	Kas	9	+ 9' 32"	
10	Carlos Echeverria	Spain	Kas	18	+ 24' 31"	
11	Miguel Pacheco	Spain	Ferrys	DNF	—	
12	José Pérez Francés	Spain	Ferrys	3	+ 1' 26"	
13	Antonio Karmany	Spain	Ferrys	15	+ 18' 07"	
14	Fernando Manzaneque	Spain	Ferrys	6	+ 4' 19"	
15	Luis Otaño	Spain	Ferrys	2	+ 33"	
16	Gabriel Mas	Spain	Ferrys	38	+ 1h 12' 11"	
17	Francisco José Suñé Montragull	Spain	Ferrys	34	+ 1h 06' 03"	
18	Rogelio Hernández Santibáñez	Spain	Ferrys	28	+ 48' 48"	
19	Antonio Bertrán	Spain	Ferrys	10	+ 11' 14"	
20	Raúl Rey Fomosel	Spain	Ferrys	39	+ 1h 26' 30"	
21	Victor Van Schil	Belgium	Mercier-BP	12	+ 13' 09"	
22	Raymond Poulidor	France	Mercier-BP	1	78h 23' 35"	
23	Robert Cazala	France	Mercier-BP	13	+ 17' 21"	
24	Frans Melckenbeeck	Belgium	Mercier-BP	37	+ 1h 11' 49"	
25	Gianni Marcarini	France	Mercier-BP	DNF	—	
26	Frans Aerenhouts	Belgium	Mercier-BP	31	+ 54' 46"	
27	Jean-Claude Annaert	France	Mercier-BP	DNF	—	
28	André Le Dissez	France	Mercier-BP	19	+ 27' 22"	
29	Jean-Pierre Genet	France	Mercier-BP	20	+ 33' 34"	
30	Barry Hoban	Great Britain	Mercier-BP	29	+ 48' 48"	
31	Agostinho Correia	Portugal	Portugal	DNF	—	
32	João Henrique Roque dos Santos	Portugal	Portugal	25	+ 38' 02"	
33	Joaquim Leão	Portugal	Portugal	DNF	—	
34	Laurentino Mendes	Portugal	Portugal	30	+ 54' 18"	
35	Jorge Corvo	Portugal	Portugal	44	+ 1h 45' 47"	
36	Pedro Junior	Portugal	Portugal	DNF	—	
37	Francisco Valada	Portugal	Portugal	23	+ 36' 18"	
38	Manuel Costa	Portugal	Portugal	35	+ 1h 09' 26"	
39	Custodio Leonardo Cristina	Portugal	Portugal	DNF	—	
40	Julio Abreu	Portugal	Portugal	49	+ 3h 59' 56"	
41	Rik Van Looy	Belgium	Solo–Superia	DNF	—	
42	Edgard Sorgeloos	Belgium	Solo–Superia	DNF	—	
43	Arthur Decabooter	Belgium	Solo–Superia	16	+ 18' 43"	
44	Armand Desmet	Belgium	Solo–Superia	DNF	—	
45	Michel Van Aerde	Belgium	Solo–Superia	24	+ 37' 30"	
46	Willy Schroeders	Belgium	Solo–Superia	DNF	—	
47	Louis Proost	Belgium	Solo–Superia	22	+ 34' 55"	
48	Henri De Wolf	Belgium	Solo–Superia	14	+ 17' 22"	
49	Willy Derboven	Belgium	Solo–Superia	36	+ 1h 10' 01"	
50	Edward Sels	Belgium	Solo–Superia	DNF	—	
51	Clements Solaro	Netherlands	Holland	DNF	—	
52	Wim van Est	Netherlands	Holland	17	+ 24' 25"	
53	Fons Steuten	Netherlands	Holland	DNF	—	
54	Leo Coehorst	Netherlands	Holland	DNF	—	
55	Karel Colpaert	Belgium	Holland	DNF	—	
56	Johan Swaneveld	Netherlands	Holland	DNF	—	
57	Cees Snepvangers	Netherlands	Holland	DNF	—	
58	Adrianus Linders	Netherlands	Holland	DNF	—	
59	Andre Van Aert	Netherlands	Holland	DNF	—	
60	Rein de Jongh	Netherlands	Holland	DNF	—	
61	Armando Pellegrini	Italy	Salvarani-Mixto	42	+ 1h 43' 48"	
62	Romano Piancastelli	Italy	Salvarani-Mixto	40	+ 1h 30' 54"	
63	Renato Longo	Italy	Salvarani-Mixto	DNF	—	
64	Ottavio Marchesi	Italy	Salvarani-Mixto	DNF	—	
65	Alberto Poletti	Italy	Salvarani-Mixto	DNF	—	
66	Giovanni Garau	Italy	Salvarani-Mixto	45	+ 1h 47' 20"	
67	Moreno Mealli	Italy	Salvarani-Mixto	DNF	—	
68	Lorenzo Carminati	Italy	Salvarani-Mixto	27	+ 40' 52"	
69	Umberto Antognacci	Italy	Salvarani-Mixto	DNF	—	
70	Sergio Alzani	Italy	Salvarani-Mixto	DNF	—	
71	Ventura Díaz	Spain	Inuri	21	+ 33' 37"	
72	Juan María Uribezubia	Spain	Inuri	DNF	—	
73	Salvador Rosa Gómez	Spain	Inuri	26	+ 40' 37"	
74	Jesús Manzaneque	Spain	Inuri	41	+ 1h 40' 47"	
75	Juan Álvarez Álvarez	Spain	Inuri	46	+ 2h 55' 26"	
76	Ángel Gutierrez	Spain	Inuri	48	+ 3h 43' 35"	
77	Angel Gomez	Spain	Inuri	47	+ 2h 57' 15"	
78	Santos Ruiz Bermúdez	Spain	Inuri	DNF	—	
79	Julio Sanz	Spain	Inuri	43	+ 1h 45' 12"	
80	Fulgencio Sánchez	Spain	Inuri	33	+ 1h 01' 01"	
