= 1963 Vuelta a España, Stage 1a to Stage 8 =

Cycling race stages

The 1963 Vuelta a España was the 18th edition of the Vuelta a España, one of cycling's Grand Tours. The Vuelta began in Gijón on 1 May, and Stage 8 occurred on 8 May with a stage to Pamplona. The race finished in Madrid on 15 May.

== Stage 1a ==
1 May 1963 - Gijón to Mieres, 45 km (28.0 mi)

Route:

Stage 1a result

Rank	Rider	Team	Time
1	Antonio Barrutia (ESP)	Kas–Kaskol	1h 18' 13"
2	Esteban Martín Jiménez (ESP)	Ferrys	+ 15"
3	Julio Jiménez (ESP)	Flandria–Faema	+ 30"
4	Antonio Karmany (ESP)	Ferrys	+ 48"
5	Jacques Simon (FRA)	Saint-Raphaël–Gitane–R. Geminiani	s.t.
6	Bas Maliepaard (NED)	Saint-Raphaël–Gitane–R. Geminiani	+ 53"
7	José Pérez Francés (ESP)	Ferrys	s.t.
8	Frans Aerenhouts (BEL)	G.B.C.–Libertas	+ 58"
9	Aldo Moser (ITA)	San Pellegrino–Firte	s.t.
10	Antonio Suárez (ESP)	Flandria–Faema	s.t.

== Stage 1b ==
1 May 1963 - Mieres to Gijón, 52 km (32.3 mi) (ITT)

Stage 1b result

Rank	Rider	Team	Time
1	Jacques Anquetil (FRA)	Saint-Raphaël–Gitane–R. Geminiani	1h 24' 53"
2	Aldo Moser (ITA)	San Pellegrino–Firte	+ 2' 55"
3	José Pérez Francés (ESP)	Ferrys	+ 3' 21"
4	José Martín Colmenarejo (ESP)	Flandria–Faema	+ 3' 43"
5	Francisco Gabica (ESP)	Kas–Kaskol	+ 3' 50"
6	Miguel Pacheco (ESP)	Kas–Kaskol	+ 4' 13"
7	Eusebio Vélez (ESP)	Kas–Kaskol	+ 4' 22"
8	Antonio Gómez del Moral (ESP)	Flandria–Faema	+ 5' 09"
9	Fernando Manzaneque (ESP)	Ferrys	+ 5' 55"
10	José Antonio Momeñe (ESP)	Kas–Kaskol	+ 6' 02"

General classification after Stage 1b

Rank	Rider	Team	Time
1	Jacques Anquetil (FRA)	Saint-Raphaël–Gitane–R. Geminiani	2h 44' 04"
2	Aldo Moser (ITA)	San Pellegrino–Firte	+ 2' 55"
3	José Pérez Francés (ESP)	Ferrys	+ 3' 16"
4	José Martín Colmenarejo (ESP)	Flandria–Faema	+ 3' 43"
5	Francisco Gabica (ESP)	Kas–Kaskol	+ 3' 50"
6	Miguel Pacheco (ESP)	Kas–Kaskol	+ 4' 13"
7	Eusebio Vélez (ESP)	Kas–Kaskol	+ 4' 22"
8	Antonio Gómez del Moral (ESP)	Flandria–Faema	+ 5' 09"
9	Antonio Barrutia (ESP)	Kas–Kaskol	+ 5' 48"
10	Fernando Manzaneque (ESP)	Ferrys	+ 5' 55"

== Stage 2 ==
2 May 1963 - Gijón to Torrelavega, 175 km (108.7 mi)

Route:

Stage 2 result

Rank	Rider	Team	Time
1	José Segú (ESP)	Flandria–Faema	4h 32' 46"
2	Bas Maliepaard (NED)	Saint-Raphaël–Gitane–R. Geminiani	+ 30"
3	Fernando Manzaneque (ESP)	Ferrys	+ 1' 06"
4	Willy Derboven (BEL)	G.B.C.–Libertas	+ 1' 34"
5	Rogelio Hernández Santibáñez (ESP)	Ferrys	+ 1' 36"
6	Sebastián Elorza (ESP)	Kas–Kaskol	s.t.
7	Jaime Alomar (ESP)	Pinturas Ega	+ 1' 39"
8	Leopold Rosseel (BEL)	Ruberg	s.t.
9	Frans Van Immerseel (BEL)	G.B.C.–Libertas	s.t.
10	José Pérez Francés (ESP)	Ferrys	s.t.

General classification after Stage 2

Rank	Rider	Team	Time
1	Jacques Anquetil (FRA)	Saint-Raphaël–Gitane–R. Geminiani	7h 18' 29"
2	Aldo Moser (ITA)	San Pellegrino–Firte	+ 2' 55"
3	José Pérez Francés (ESP)	Ferrys	+ 3' 16"
4	José Martín Colmenarejo (ESP)	Flandria–Faema	+ 3' 43"
5	Francisco Gabica (ESP)	Kas–Kaskol	+ 3' 50"
6	Miguel Pacheco (ESP)	Kas–Kaskol	+ 4' 13"
7	Eusebio Vélez (ESP)	Kas–Kaskol	+ 4' 22"
8	Bas Maliepaard (NED)	Saint-Raphaël–Gitane–R. Geminiani	+ 4' 55"
9	Antonio Gómez del Moral (ESP)	Flandria–Faema	+ 5' 09"
10	Fernando Manzaneque (ESP)	Ferrys	+ 5' 22"

== Stage 3 ==
3 May 1963 - Torrelavega to Vitoria, 249 km (155 mi)

Route:

Stage 3 result

Rank	Rider	Team	Time
1	Antonio Barrutia (ESP)	Kas–Kaskol	7h 05' 22"
2	Seamus Elliott (IRL)	Saint-Raphaël–Gitane–R. Geminiani	+ 37"
3	Julio Sanz (ESP)	Pinturas Ega	+ 1' 01"
4	José Martín Colmenarejo (ESP)	Flandria–Faema	s.t.
5	José Pérez Francés (ESP)	Ferrys	+ 3' 00"
6	Frans Aerenhouts (BEL)	G.B.C.–Libertas	s.t.
7	Bas Maliepaard (NED)	Saint-Raphaël–Gitane–R. Geminiani	s.t.
8	Jaime Alomar (ESP)	Pinturas Ega	s.t.
9	Eusebio Vélez (ESP)	Kas–Kaskol	s.t.
10	Antonio Suárez (ESP)	Flandria–Faema	s.t.

General classification after Stage 3

Rank	Rider	Team	Time
1	Jacques Anquetil (FRA)	Saint-Raphaël–Gitane–R. Geminiani	14h 26' 51"
2	José Martín Colmenarejo (ESP)	Flandria–Faema	+ 1' 44"
3	Antonio Barrutia (ESP)	Kas–Kaskol	+ 2' 48"
4	Aldo Moser (ITA)	San Pellegrino–Firte	+ 2' 55"
5	José Pérez Francés (ESP)	Ferrys	+ 3' 16"
6	Francisco Gabica (ESP)	Kas–Kaskol	+ 3' 50"
7	Miguel Pacheco (ESP)	Kas–Kaskol	+ 4' 13"
8	Eusebio Vélez (ESP)	Kas–Kaskol	+ 4' 22"
9	Seamus Elliott (IRL)	Saint-Raphaël–Gitane–R. Geminiani	+ 4' 36"
10	Bas Maliepaard (NED)	Saint-Raphaël–Gitane–R. Geminiani	+ 4' 45"

== Stage 4 ==
4 May 1963 - Vitoria to Bilbao, 104 km (65 mi)

Route:

Stage 4 result

Rank	Rider	Team	Time
1	Jan Lauwers (BEL)	G.B.C.–Libertas	2h 35' 32"
2	Bas Maliepaard (NED)	Saint-Raphaël–Gitane–R. Geminiani	+ 1' 07"
3	Frans Aerenhouts (BEL)	G.B.C.–Libertas	+ 1' 37"
4	José Segú (ESP)	Flandria–Faema	s.t.
5	Antonio Barrutia (ESP)	Kas–Kaskol	s.t.
6	Edgard Sorgeloos (BEL)	G.B.C.–Libertas	s.t.
7	José Alfonso Rodrigo Alcino (POR)	Portugal	s.t.
8	Antonio Suárez (ESP)	Flandria–Faema	s.t.
9	Jaime Alomar (ESP)	Pinturas Ega	s.t.
10	Frans Van Immerseel (BEL)	G.B.C.–Libertas	s.t.

General classification after Stage 4

Rank	Rider	Team	Time
1	Jacques Anquetil (FRA)	Saint-Raphaël–Gitane–R. Geminiani	17h 03' 40"
2	José Martín Colmenarejo (ESP)	Flandria–Faema	+ 2' 04"
3	Aldo Moser (ITA)	San Pellegrino–Firte	+ 2' 55"
4	Antonio Barrutia (ESP)	Kas–Kaskol	+ 3' 08"
5	José Pérez Francés (ESP)	Ferrys	+ 3' 16"
6	Francisco Gabica (ESP)	Kas–Kaskol	+ 3' 50"
7	Miguel Pacheco (ESP)	Kas–Kaskol	+ 4' 13"
8	Eusebio Vélez (ESP)	Kas–Kaskol	+ 4' 22"
9	Bas Maliepaard (NED)	Saint-Raphaël–Gitane–R. Geminiani	+ 4' 25"
10	Seamus Elliott (IRL)	Saint-Raphaël–Gitane–R. Geminiani	+ 4' 57"

== Stage 5 ==
5 May 1963 - Bilbao to Bilbao, 191 km (119 mi)

Route:

Stage 5 result

Rank	Rider	Team	Time
1	Bas Maliepaard (NED)	Saint-Raphaël–Gitane–R. Geminiani	5h 23' 48"
2	Giorgio Zancanaro (ITA)	San Pellegrino–Firte	+ 30"
3	José Pérez Francés (ESP)	Ferrys	+ 1' 00"
4	Manuel Martin Pinera (ESP)	Kas–Kaskol	s.t.
5	Antonio Suárez (ESP)	Flandria–Faema	s.t.
6	Jacques Anquetil (FRA)	Saint-Raphaël–Gitane–R. Geminiani	s.t.
7	Antonio Karmany (ESP)	Ferrys	s.t.
8	José Martín Colmenarejo (ESP)	Flandria–Faema	s.t.
9	Fernando Manzaneque (ESP)	Ferrys	s.t.
10	Miguel Pacheco (ESP)	Kas–Kaskol	s.t.

General classification after Stage 5

Rank	Rider	Team	Time
1	Jacques Anquetil (FRA)	Saint-Raphaël–Gitane–R. Geminiani	22h 28' 28"
2	José Martín Colmenarejo (ESP)	Flandria–Faema	+ 2' 04"
3	Antonio Barrutia (ESP)	Kas–Kaskol	+ 3' 08"
4	José Pérez Francés (ESP)	Ferrys	+ 3' 16"
5	Bas Maliepaard (NED)	Saint-Raphaël–Gitane–R. Geminiani	+ 3' 25"
6	Miguel Pacheco (ESP)	Kas–Kaskol	+ 4' 23"
7	Fernando Manzaneque (ESP)	Ferrys	+ 5' 22"
8	Francisco Gabica (ESP)	Kas–Kaskol	s.t.
9	Eusebio Vélez (ESP)	Kas–Kaskol	+ 5' 30"
10	Antonio Karmany (ESP)	Ferrys	+ 6' 10"

== Stage 6 ==
6 May 1963 - Bilbao to Eibar, 165 km (103 mi)

Route:

Stage 6 result

Rank	Rider	Team	Time
1	Guy Ignolin (FRA)	Saint-Raphaël–Gitane–R. Geminiani	4h 39' 01"
2	Carlos Echeverria (ESP)	Kas–Kaskol	+ 1' 42"
3	Antonio Barrutia (ESP)	Kas–Kaskol	+ 3' 28"
4	Bas Maliepaard (NED)	Saint-Raphaël–Gitane–R. Geminiani	s.t.
5	Frans Aerenhouts (BEL)	G.B.C.–Libertas	s.t.
6	Edgard Sorgeloos (BEL)	G.B.C.–Libertas	s.t.
7	José Antonio Momeñe (ESP)	Kas–Kaskol	s.t.
8	José Pérez Francés (ESP)	Ferrys	s.t.
9	Fernando Manzaneque (ESP)	Ferrys	s.t.
10	Giorgio Zancanaro (ITA)	San Pellegrino–Firte	s.t.

== Stage 7 ==
7 May 1963 - Eibar to Tolosa, 138 km (86 mi)

Route:

Stage 7 result

Rank	Rider	Team	Time
1	Valentín Uriona (ESP)	Kas–Kaskol	3h 33' 31"
2	Frans Aerenhouts (BEL)	G.B.C.–Libertas	+ 30"
3	Edgard Sorgeloos (BEL)	G.B.C.–Libertas	+ 1' 00"
4	Antonio Barrutia (ESP)	Kas–Kaskol	s.t.
5	Antonio Suárez (ESP)	Flandria–Faema	s.t.
6	Jean Stablinski (FRA)	Saint-Raphaël–Gitane–R. Geminiani	s.t.
7	Jaime Alomar (ESP)	Pinturas Ega	s.t.
8	Giorgio Zancanaro (ITA)	San Pellegrino–Firte	s.t.
9	Martin Van Geneugden (BEL)	G.B.C.–Libertas	s.t.
10	José Segú (ESP)	Flandria–Faema	s.t.

General classification after Stage 7

Rank	Rider	Team	Time
1	Jacques Anquetil (FRA)	Saint-Raphaël–Gitane–R. Geminiani	30h 45' 28"
2	José Martín Colmenarejo (ESP)	Flandria–Faema	+ 2' 04"
3	Antonio Barrutia (ESP)	Kas–Kaskol	+ 3' 08"
4	José Pérez Francés (ESP)	Ferrys	+ 3' 16"
5	Bas Maliepaard (NED)	Saint-Raphaël–Gitane–R. Geminiani	+ 3' 25"
6	Miguel Pacheco (ESP)	Kas–Kaskol	+ 4' 23"
7	Fernando Manzaneque (ESP)	Ferrys	+ 5' 22"
8	Francisco Gabica (ESP)	Kas–Kaskol	s.t.
9	Eusebio Vélez (ESP)	Kas–Kaskol	+ 5' 23"
10	Antonio Karmany (ESP)	Ferrys	+ 6' 10"

== Stage 8 ==
8 May 1963 - Tolosa to Pamplona, 169 km (105 mi)

Route:

Stage 8 result

Rank	Rider	Team	Time
1	José Pérez Francés (ESP)	Ferrys	4h 33' 34"
2	José Segú (ESP)	Flandria–Faema	+ 30"
3	Antonio Suárez (ESP)	Flandria–Faema	+ 1' 00"
4	Antonio Karmany (ESP)	Ferrys	s.t.
5	Edgard Sorgeloos (BEL)	G.B.C.–Libertas	s.t.
6	João Henrique Roque dos Santos (POR)	Portugal	s.t.
7	Antonio Barrutia (ESP)	Kas–Kaskol	s.t.
8	Bas Maliepaard (NED)	Saint-Raphaël–Gitane–R. Geminiani	s.t.
9	Roger Thull (LUX)	Ruberg	s.t.
10	José Antonio Momeñe (ESP)	Kas–Kaskol	s.t.

General classification after Stage 8

Rank	Rider	Team	Time
1	Jacques Anquetil (FRA)	Saint-Raphaël–Gitane–R. Geminiani	35h 20' 02"
2	José Martín Colmenarejo (ESP)	Flandria–Faema	+ 2' 04"
3	José Pérez Francés (ESP)	Ferrys	+ 2' 16"
4	Antonio Barrutia (ESP)	Kas–Kaskol	+ 3' 08"
5	Bas Maliepaard (NED)	Saint-Raphaël–Gitane–R. Geminiani	+ 3' 25"
6	Miguel Pacheco (ESP)	Kas–Kaskol	+ 4' 13"
7	Fernando Manzaneque (ESP)	Ferrys	+ 5' 22"
8	Francisco Gabica (ESP)	Kas–Kaskol	s.t.
9	Eusebio Vélez (ESP)	Kas–Kaskol	+ 5' 30"
10	Antonio Karmany (ESP)	Ferrys	+ 6' 10"
