= 1966 Brabantse Pijl =

Race details
- Dates: 7 April 1966
- Stages: 1
- Distance: 174 km (108.1 mi)
- Winning time: 4h 31' 00"

Results
	Winner	Jan Janssen (NED)
	Second	Bas Maliepaard (NED)
	Third	Jos van der Vleuten (NED)

The 1966 Brabantse Pijl was the sixth edition of the Brabantse Pijl cycle race and was held on 7 April 1966. The race started and finished in Brussels. The race was won by Jan Janssen.

== General classification ==
Final general classification

Rank	Rider	Time
1	Jan Janssen (NED)	4h 31' 00"
2	Bas Maliepaard (NED)	+ 0"
3	Jos van der Vleuten (NED)	+ 0"
4	Leo Knops (NED)	+ 15"
5	Arie den Hartog (NED)	+ 3' 15"
6	René Van Meenen (BEL)	+ 3' 15"
7	Frans Melckenbeeck (BEL)	+ 3' 20"
8	Michel Grain (FRA)	+ 3' 20"
9	Jo de Roo (NED)	+ 3' 20"
10	Constant Jongen (BEL)	+ 3' 20"
