= Ronde van Brabant =

Recurring sporting event

Race details
- Date: May, July, August
- Region: Flanders, Belgium
- English name: Tour of Brabant
- Local name(s): Ronde van Brabant (Dutch), Tour du Brabant (French)
- Discipline: Road
- Type: One-day

History
- First edition: 1952
- Editions: 15
- Final edition: 1971
- First winner: Jozef De Feyter (BEL)
- Most wins: Jozef Wouters (BEL) (2 wins)
- Final winner: François Maes (BEL)

The Ronde van Brabant was a men's cycling race organized for the last time in 1971. The race was run in Lubbeek in the Belgian Province of Brabant.

The competition's roll of honor includes the success of Rik Van Looy.

== Winners ==
Year	Winner	Second	Third
1952	(Belgium) Jozef De Feyter	(Belgium) Frans Loyaerts	(Belgium) Lode Elaerts
1953	(Belgium) Ernest Sterckx	(Belgium) Henri Jochums	(Belgium) Désiré Keteleer
1954	(Belgium) Jan De Valk	(Belgium) Joseph Plas	(Belgium) Jan Storms
1955	(Belgium) Henri Van Kerckhove	(Belgium) Karel Borgmans	(Belgium) René Mertens
1956	(Belgium) Jan Adriaensens	(Belgium) Pino Cerami	(Belgium) Jozef Theunis
1957	No race		
1958	(Belgium) Roger Decorte	(Belgium) Jean Van Gompel	(Netherlands) Eddy De Waal
1959	(Belgium) Roger Baens	(Belgium) Désiré Keteleer	(Belgium) Raymond Vrancken
1960	(Belgium) Rik Van Looy	(Belgium) Emile Daems	(Belgium) Roger Baens
1961	(Belgium) Jozef Wouters	(Belgium) Jan Van Gompel	(Belgium) Henri Schaerlaeckers
1962	(Belgium) Jozef Wouters	(Belgium) Constant De Keyser	(Belgium) Arthur Decabooter
1963	(Belgium) Roger De Coninck	(Belgium) Guillaume Demaer	(Belgium) René Van Meenen
1964	(Belgium) Edgar Sorgeloos	(Belgium) Rik Van Looy	(Belgium) Joseph Corstjens
1965	(Belgium) Joseph Haeseldonckx	(Belgium) Richard Everaerts	(Belgium) Théo Nys
1966	(Belgium) Frans Aerenhouts	(Belgium) Raymond Vrancken	(Belgium) Roger Cooreman
1967-1970	No race		
1971	(Belgium) François Maes	(Belgium) Paul Aerts	(Belgium) Julien Van Lint
