= Klundert (disambiguation) =

Kundert can refer to

- Klundert, city in the Dutch province of North Brabant

== People ==
- Jacques van der Klundert (b. 1938), Dutch bicycle racer
- Raymond van de Klundert (b. 1964), Dutch author
- Theo van de Klundert (1936–2024), Dutch economist
