= Seyve =

Seyve is a surname. Notable people with the surname include:

- Guy Seyve, French cyclist
- Joannes Seyve, French biochemist

== See also ==
- Seyve Villard, grouping of French wine hybrid grape varieties
