= 1963 Vuelta a España =

Race details
- Dates: 1 May – 15 May
- Stages: 15
- Distance: 2,442 km (1,517 mi)
- Winning time: 64h 46' 20"

Results
Jersey awarded to the overall winner	Winner	Jacques Anquetil (FRA)	(St.Raphael-Gitane)
	Second	José Martin Perez (ESP)	(Faema)
	Third	Miguel Pacheco (ESP)	(Kas-Kaskol)
Jersey awarded to the points classification winner	Points	Bas Maliepaard (NED)	(St.Raphael-Gitane)
	Mountains	Julio Jiménez (ESP)	(Faema)
	Sprints	José Segú (ESP)	(Faema)

The 18th Vuelta a España (Tour of Spain), a long-distance bicycle stage race and one of the three grand tours, was held from 1 May to 15 May 1963. It consisted of 15 stages covering a total of 2,442 km (1,517 mi), and was won by Jacques Anquetil of the St. Raphael-Gitane cycling team. Not only did Anquetil complete his Grand Tour treble, this also marked the first time in history a rider won two Grand Tours in the same calendar year for his team sponsor (since most Grand Tours from the 1930s until the early 1960s were contested in national teams). Bas Maliepaard won the points classification and Julio Jiménez won the mountains classification.

== Route ==
List of stages
Stage	Date	Course	Distance	Type	Winner
1a	1 May	Gijón to Mieres	45 km (28 mi)		Antonio Barrutia (ESP)
1b	1 May	Mieres to Gijón	52 km (32 mi)	Individual time trial	Jacques Anquetil (FRA)
2	2 May	Gijón to Torrelavega	175 km (109 mi)		José Segú (ESP)
3	3 May	Torrelavega to Vitoria	249 km (155 mi)		Antonio Barrutia (ESP)
4	4 May	Vitoria to Bilbao	104 km (65 mi)		Jan Lauwers (BEL)
5	5 May	Bilbao to Bilbao	191 km (119 mi)		Bas Maliepaard (NED)
6	6 May	Bilbao to Eibar	165 km (103 mi)		Guy Ignolin (FRA)
7	7 May	Eibar to Tolosa	138 km (86 mi)		Valentín Uriona (ESP)
8	8 May	Tolosa to Pamplona	169 km (105 mi)		José Pérez Francés (ESP)
9	9 May	Pamplona to Zaragoza	180 km (112 mi)		Roger Baens (BEL)
10	10 May	Zaragoza to Lleida	144 km (89 mi)		Jean Stablinski (FRA)
11	11 May	Lleida to Barcelona	182 km (113 mi)		Jan Lauwers (BEL)
12a	12 May	Barcelona to Barcelona	80 km (50 mi)		Frans Aerenhouts (BEL)
12b	12 May	Sitges to Tarragona	52 km (32 mi)	Individual time trial	Miguel Pacheco (ESP)
13	13 May	Tarragona to Valencia	252 km (157 mi)		Seamus Elliott (IRL)
14	14 May	Cuenca to Madrid	177 km (110 mi)		Roger Baens (BEL)
15	15 May	Madrid to Madrid	87 km (54 mi)		Guy Ignolin (FRA)
	Total		2,442 km (1,517 mi)		

== Results ==
Final general classification
Rank	Rider	Team	Time
1	(France) Jacques Anquetil	St.Raphael-Gitane	64h 46' 20"
2	(Spain) José Martin Perez	Faema	+ 3' 06"
3	(Spain) Miguel Pacheco	Kas-Kaskol	+ 3' 32"
4	(Netherlands) Bas Maliepaard	St.Raphael-Gitane	+ 5' 06"
5	(Spain) Francisco Gabica	Kas-Kaskol	+ 7' 57"
6	(Spain) Antonio Suárez	Faema	+ 8' 13"
7	(Spain) Eusebio Vélez	Kas-Kaskol	+ 8' 34"
8	(Spain) Antonio Gómez del Moral	Faema	+ 9' 10"
9	(France) Jean Stablinski	St.Raphael-Gitane	+ 9' 31"
10	(Belgium) Guillaume Van Tongerloo	GBC-Libertas	+ 10' 48"
11	(Spain) Antonio Barrutia	Kas-Kaskol	
12	(Belgium) Frans Aerenhouts	GBC-Libertas	
13	(Spain) Fernando Manzaneque	Ferrys	
14	(Spain) Antonio Karmany	Ferrys	
15	(Belgium) Edgard Sorgeloos	GBC-Libertas	
16	(Spain) José Antonio Momene	Kas-Kaskol	
17	(France) Gérard Thiélin	St.Raphael-Gitane	
18	(Spain) Valentín Uriona	Kas-Kaskol	
19	(France) Anatole Novak	St.Raphael-Gitane	
20	(Spain) Sebastián Elorza	Kas-Kaskol	
21	(West Germany) Dieter Puschel	Wiels-Groene Leeuw	
22	(Belgium) Roger Baens	GBC-Libertas	
23	(Spain) Julio Jiménez	Faema	
24	(Spain) Esteban Martín	Ferrys	
25	(Spain) Carlos Echeverría	Kas-Kaskol	
