= Paul Vermeulen =

French cyclist

Personal information
- Born: 11 January 1938 Aire-sur-la-Lys, Pas-de-Calais, France
- Died: 22 May 2024 (aged 86) Beuvry, Pas-de-Calais, France

Cycling career
- Sport: Cycling
- Role: Rider

Paul Vermeulen (11 January 1938 – 22 May 2024) was a French racing cyclist. He rode in the 1964 Tour de France.
