= Camiel Vyncke =

Belgian cyclist

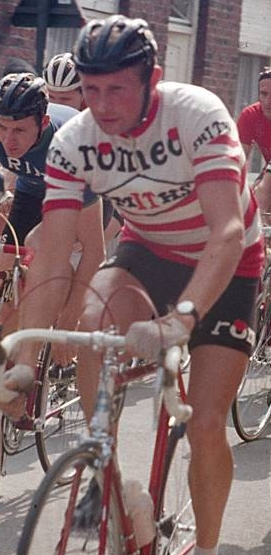

Personal information
- Born: 18 November 1940 (age 85)

Cycling career
- Sport: Cycling
- Role: Rider

Camiel Vyncke (born 18 November 1940) is a Belgian racing cyclist. He rode in the 1964 Tour de France.
