= Fons Steuten =

Dutch cyclist

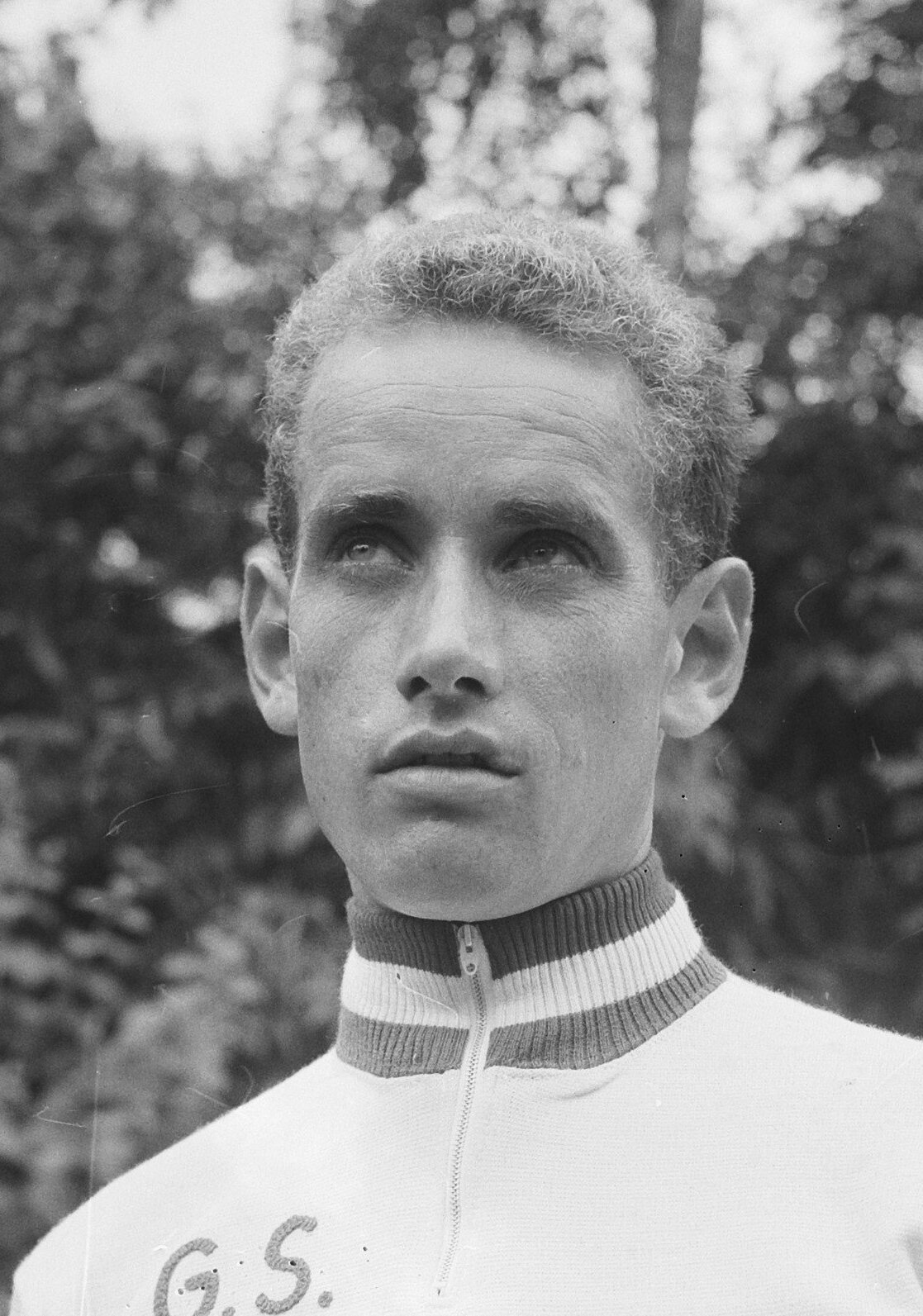
- Steuten in 1964

Personal information
- Born: 23 February 1938 Weert, Limburg, Netherlands
- Died: 22 September 1991 (aged 53) Weert, Limburg, Netherlands

Sport
- Sport: Cycling

Alfons "Fons" Steuten (Dutch pronunciation: [(ˈɑl)fɔn ˈstøːtə(n)]; 23 February 1938 – 22 September 1991) was a Dutch cyclist. He won the 1976 Rás Tailteann.

== Biography ==
Steuten was born in Weert, Netherlands in 1938.

Steuten competed in the 1962 Vuelta a España, 1964 Vuelta a España and the 1964 Tour de France. Steuten won the Rás Tailteann in Ireland in June 1976.

Steuten died in Weert in 1991.
