= Jacques van der Klundert =

Dutch bicycle racer

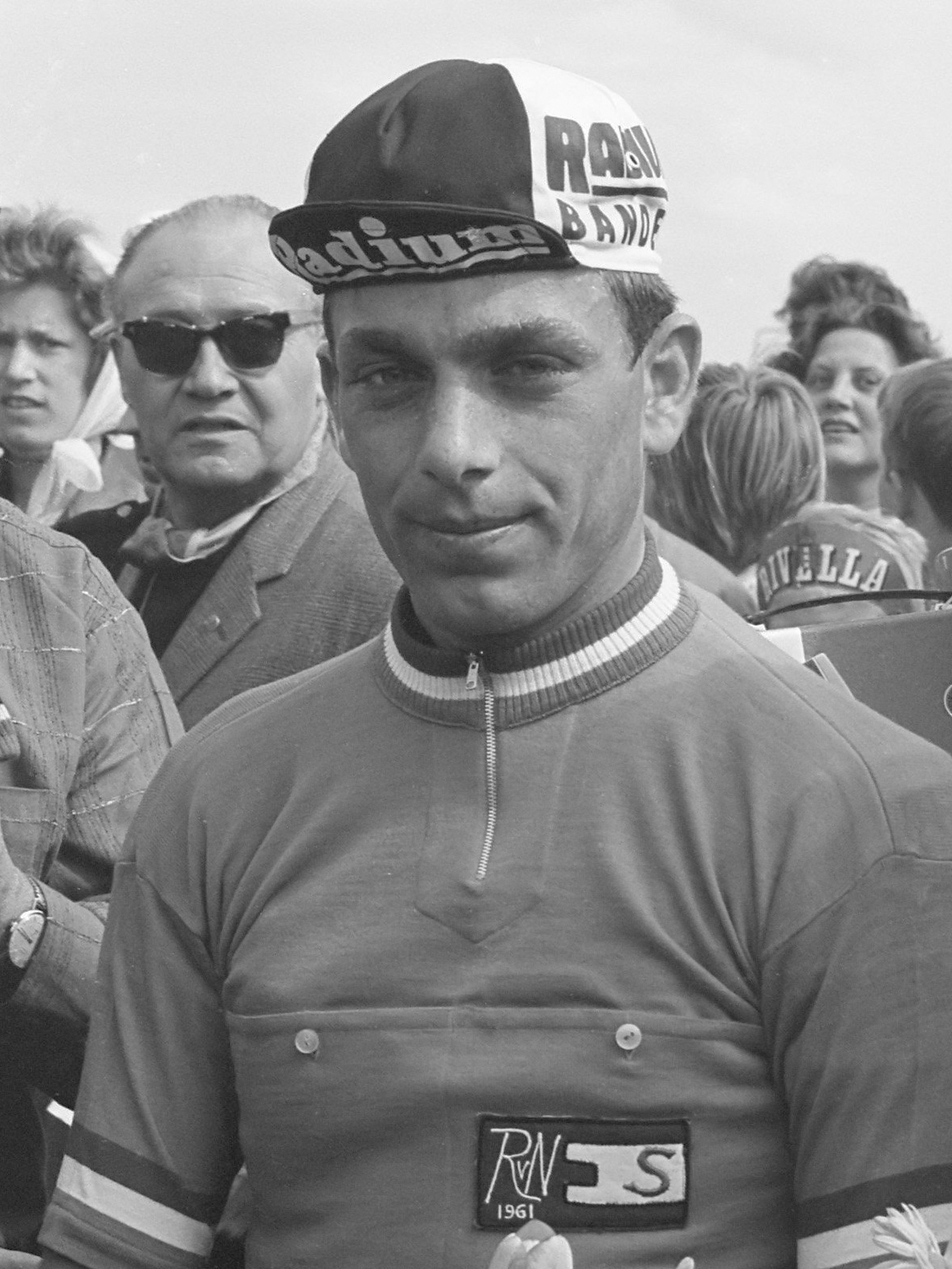
- van der Klundert in 1961

Personal information
- Born: 15 April 1938 (age 88) De Heen, Steenbergen, the Netherlands

Cycling career
- Sport: Cycling
- Role: Rider

Jacques van der Klundert (born 15 April 1938) is a retired Dutch professional road racing cyclist. He won one stage of the Olympia's Tour in 1960 and rode the Tour de France in 1964.
