= André van Aert =

Dutch cyclist (born 1940)

Personal information
- Born: 23 May 1940 (age 86) Zundert, Netherlands

Cycling career
- Sport: Cycling
- Current team: Retired
- Discipline: Road
- Role: Rider

Professional teams
- 1962: Breda Bier
- 1964: Televizier
- 1964: Wiel's–Groene Leeuw
- 1965: Sunkist Fruit
- 1966: Willem II–Gazelle

André van Aert (born 23 May 1940) is a Dutch former racing cyclist. He rode in the 1964 Tour de France and the 1964 Vuelta a España.

== Major results ==
1961
1st Ronde van Zuid-Holland
