= Guy Seyve =

French cyclist

Personal information
- Born: 26 May 1942 (age 84)

Cycling career
- Sport: Cycling
- Current team: Retired
- Discipline: Road
- Role: Rider

Professional team
- 1964–1965: Peugeot–BP–Englebert

Guy Seyve (born 26 May 1942) is a French former racing cyclist. He rode in the 1964 Tour de France.
