= Roger Baens =

Belgian cyclist (1933–2020)

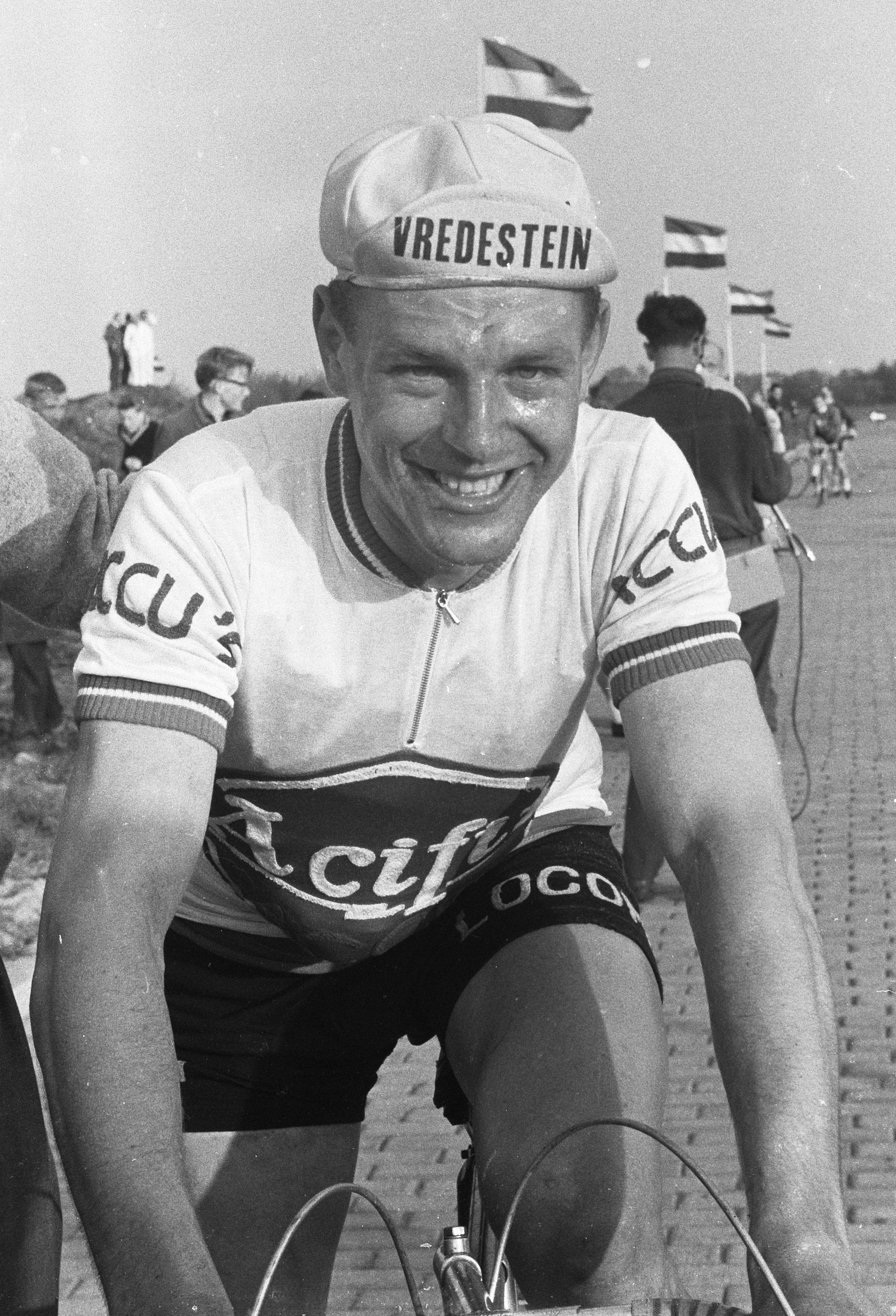
- Roger Baens in 1960

Personal information
- Born: 18 August 1933 Molenstede, Belgium
- Died: 26 March 2020 (aged 86) Rillaar

Cycling career
- Sport: Cycling

Professional teams
- 1956: Mercier
- 1957: Carpano
- 1958: Libertas
- 1959: Peugeot
- 1959: Flandria
- 1960: Philco
- 1960: Libertas–Eura Drinks
- 1961: Bertin
- 1962: Faemino–Faema
- 1962: Faema
- 1963–1964: G.B.C.–Libertas

Roger Baens (18 August 1933 – 26 March 2020) was a Belgian cyclist.

== Major results ==
1954
1st Stage 2 Tour de Belgique amateurs
1st Stage 4 Tour du Nord
1955
1st National Amateur Road Race Championships
1956
1st Stage 2 Tour d'Anvers-Gand
1957
1st Stage 15 Vuelta a España
1958
1st Stage 3 Tour of Belgium
1st Ronde van Limburg
1st De Drie Zustersteden
1st Grote Prijs Stad Zottegem
1959
1st Overall Dwars door Vlaanderen

1st Stage 1

1st Tour du Brabant
1st Grand Prix d'Orchies
1st Stage 3 Ronde van Limburg
1960
1st Grand Prix des Carrières
1st Stage 3 Tour du Brabant
2nd Overall Tour of the Netherlands

1st Stages 1 & 2

1961
1st Stage 2 Tour of the Netherlands
1st Stage 2 Grand Prix de Denain
1962
1st Stage 2 (TTT) Tour de France
3rd Overall Deutschland Tour

1st Stage 3

1963
1st Stages 9 & 14 Vuelta a España

=== Grand Tour Results ===
1957
22nd Overall, Vuelta a España
1959
DNF, Vuelta a España
1962
43rd Overall Tour de France
1963
22nd Overall, Vuelta a España
DNF Tour de France after Stage 10
