= Juan Sánchez (cyclist) =

Spanish cyclist

Personal information
- Full name: Juan Sánchez Camero
- Born: 21 June 1938 (age 88) Quesada, Jaén, Spain

Cycling career
- Sport: Cycling

Juan Sánchez (born 21 June 1938) is a Spanish former cyclist. He competed in the individual road race and team time trial events at the 1960 Summer Olympics.
