= José Martín Colmenarejo =

Spanish cyclist (1936–1995)

Personal information
- Full name: José Martín Colmenarejo Pérez
- Born: 7 April 1936 Madrid, Spain
- Died: 27 November 1995 (aged 59) Soria, Spain

Cycling career
- Sport: Cycling
- Discipline: Road
- Role: Rider

Professional teams
- 1960–1961: Catigene
- 1962–1963: Faema
- 1964: Inuri
- 1965: Margnat–Paloma–Inuri–Dunlop
- 1966: Libertas
- 1966: Olimpia

José Martín Colmenarejo Pérez (7 April 1936 – 27 November 1995) was a Spanish racing cyclist. Professional from 1960 to 1966, he finished second in the 1963 Vuelta a España behind Jacques Anquetil.

== Major results ==
1961
1st Stages 3b (TTT) & 7 Volta a Catalunya
1962
1st Stages 7 & 9 Vuelta a Colombia
2nd Campeonato Vasco-Navarro de Montaña
3rd Overall Vuelta a la Comunidad Valenciana
1963
1st Overall Vuelta a la Comunidad Valenciana

1st Stage 5

1st Stage 3 Tour de Suisse
2nd Overall Vuelta a España
1964
5th Overall Tour de Suisse

1st Stage 4

1965
1st Stage 13 Vuelta a España
1st Stage 15 Volta a Portugal
