= Jacques Simon (cyclist) =

French cyclist (1938–2021)

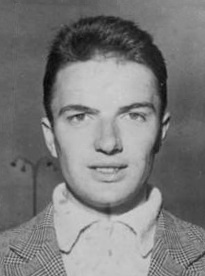
- Jacques Simon in 1960

Personal information
- Born: 1 October 1938 Saint-Pol-de-Léon, Finistère, France
- Died: 7 October 2021 (aged 83)
- Height: 1.82 m (6 ft 0 in)
- Weight: 72 kg (159 lb)

Sport
- Sport: Cycling

Jacques Simon (1 October 1938 – 7 October 2021) was a French cyclist. He competed at the 1960 Summer Olympics in the 100 km team time trial and finished in seventh place. Between 1961 and 1977 he won at least 14 one-day races.
