= Romano Piancastelli =

Italian cyclist

Personal information
- Born: 24 August 1940 (age 86)

Cycling career
- Sport: Cycling
- Role: Rider

Romano Piancastelli (born 24 August 1940) is an Italian racing cyclist. He rode in the 1964 Tour de France.
