= Bas Maliepaard =

Dutch cyclist (1938–2024)

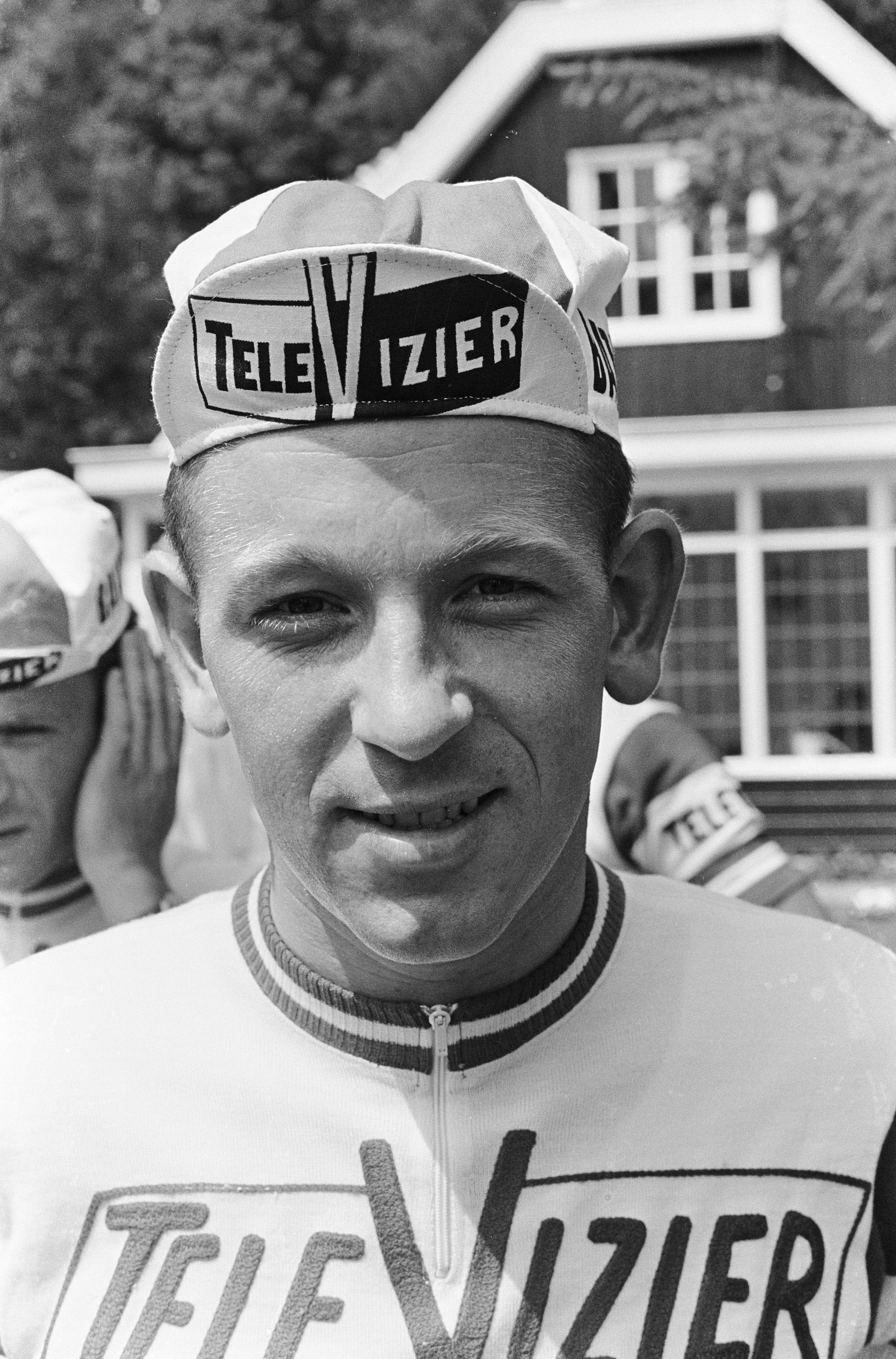
- Maliepaard in 1966

Personal information
- Full name: Bas Maliepaard
- Born: 3 April 1938 Willemstad, Netherlands
- Died: 11 July 2024 (aged 86) Breda, Netherlands

Cycling career
- Sport: Cycling
- Discipline: Road
- Role: Rider

Professional teams
- 1960–1961: Saint-Raphaël–R. Geminiani–Dunlop
- 1962: Gitane–Leroux–Dunlop–R. Geminiani
- 1963–1964: Saint-Raphaël–Gitane–R. Geminiani
- 1965–1966: Televizier
- 1967: Roméo–Smith's

Major wins
- Grand Tours Vuelta a España Points classification (1963) 1 individual stage (1963) One-day Races and Classics National Road Race Championships (1960, 1961)
Medal record
Representing the Netherlands
UCI Road World Championships
Silver medal – second place	1959 Zandvoort	Amateur Road Race

Bastiaan Maliepaard (3 April 1938 – 11 July 2024) was a Dutch cyclist who was active between 1959 and 1967. He won the Dutch national road race champion in 1960 and 1961, as well as the winner of the points classification at the 1963 Vuelta a España.

Maliepaard died from a cardiac arrest on 11 July 2024, at the age of 86.

== Major results ==
1959
1st Ronde van Overijssel
1st Stage 5b Olympia's Tour
2nd Road race, UCI World Amateur Championships
1960
1st Road race, National Road Championships
7th Ronde van Brabant
9th Overall Ronde van Nederland
1961
1st Road race, National Road Championships
3rd Trofeo Baracchi (with Jean-Claude Lebaube)
7th Paris–Roubaix
8th Overall Four Days of Dunkirk
9th Omloop Het Volk
1962
1st Stage 3a Four Days of Dunkirk
1st Stage 3 Tour de l'Oise
5th Overall Paris–Nice

1st Stage 3a (TTT)

7th Overall Tour de Luxembourg
9th Overall Eibarko Bizikleta
10th Overall Vuelta a Levante

1st Stage 5

10th Gent–Wevelgem
1963
Eibarko Bizikleta

1st Stages 1 & 2

2nd Grand Prix d'Isbergues
3rd Bordeaux–Paris
3rd Grand Prix du Parisien
4th Overall Vuelta a España

1st Points classification
1st Stage 5

5th Rund um den Henninger Turm
6th Trofeo Baracchi (with Jo de Roo)
1964
2nd Overall Tour de Luxembourg
3rd Overall Vuelta a Andalucía
8th La Flèche Wallonne
10th Overall Tour of Belgium
10th Overall Four Days of Dunkirk

1st Stage 4

1965
2nd Overall Ronde van Nederland
7th Overall Tour of Belgium
1966
2nd Brabantse Pijl

=== Grand Tour general classification results timeline ===
Grand Tour	1960	1961	1962	1963	1964	1965	1966	1967
Vuelta a España	—	—	—	4	—	—	DNF	30
Giro d'Italia	Did not contest during career							
Tour de France	—	—	47	—	—	51	DNF	DNF

Legend
—	Did not compete
DNF	Did not finish
