= Francisco Suñé =

Spanish cyclist

Personal information
- Born: 17 November 1936 (age 89) fallecido 2024 01 09

Cycling career
- Sport: Cycling
- Role: Rider

Francisco Suñé (born 17 November 1936) is a Spanish racing cyclist. He rode in the 1964 Tour de France.
