= Miguel Pacheco =

Spanish cyclist

Personal information
- Born: 5 September 1931 Sabadell, Spain
- Died: 17 February 2018 (aged 86) Barcelona, Spain

Cycling career
- Sport: Cycling
- Discipline: Road
- Role: Rider

Professional teams
- 1956: Splendid–d'Alessandro
- 1957–1960: Faema–Guerra
- 1960: Catigene
- 1960–1961: Licor 43
- 1962–1963: Kas
- 1964: Ferrys
- 1965: Tedi Montjuich
- 1966: Libertas
- 1966: Andrés Oliver
- 1966: Olimpia

Miguel Pacheco (5 September 1931 – 17 February 2018) was a Spanish racing cyclist. In 1959 he won the Vuelta a Andalucía.

== Major results ==
1955
1st Stage 5 Volta a Catalunya
1956
1st Stage 8 Vuelta a Asturias
1958
1st Stage 1 Vuelta a España
1959
1st Overall Vuelta a Andalucía
1st Campeonato Vasco-Navarro de Montaña
3rd GP Pascuas
3rd Trofeo Masferrer
1960
3rd Overall Vuelta a España

1st Stage 1 (TTT)

1962
1st Stage 3b Volta a Catalunya
4th Overall Vuelta a España
1963
2nd National Road Race Championships
3rd Overall Vuelta a España

1st Stage 12b
