= Antonio Barrutia =

Spanish cyclist (1933–2021)

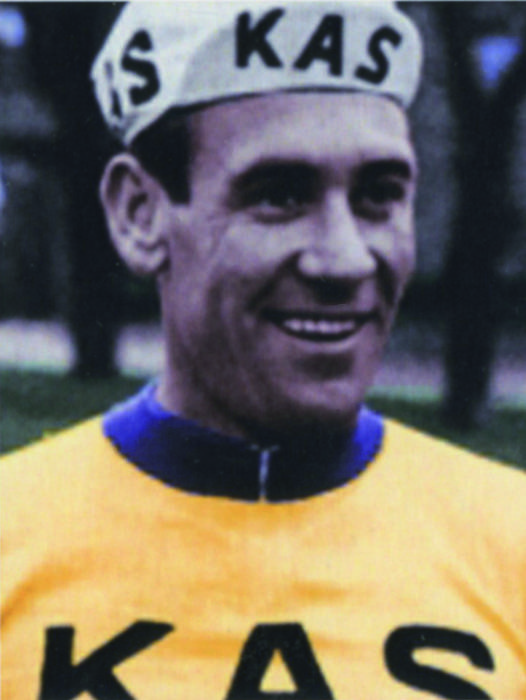

Personal information
- Full name: Antonio Barrutia Iturriagoitia
- Born: 13 June 1933 Iurreta, Spain
- Died: 13 July 2021 (aged 88)

Cycling career
- Sport: Cycling
- Current team: Retired
- Discipline: Road
- Role: Rider

Professional teams
- 1955–1957: Gamma
- 1958: Lube–NSU
- 1959: Boxing Ciclo Club
- 1960: Brandy Majestad
- 1961: Catigene
- 1962–1966: Kas

Antonio Barrutia Iturriagoitia (13 June 1933 – 13 July 2021) was a Spanish cyclist. Professional from 1953 to 1966, he won the Vuelta a Andalucía in 1963 and seven stages of the Vuelta a España. He rode in eight editions of the Vuelta a España and three editions of the Tour de France.

His brother, Cosme was also a professional cyclist.

== Major results ==
1952
3rd National Road Race Championships
1953
1st GP Llodio
1st Stage 5 Vuelta a Asturias
1954
1st Circuito de Getxo
1st GP Llodio
3rd Prueba Villafranca de Ordizia
3rd Overall GP Ayutamiento Bilbao

1st Stages 1 & 3

1955
1st Stage 4B Vuelta a Andalucía
1st Subida a Arrate
3rd Circuito de Getxo
1956
1st Stage 5 Vuelta a Asturias
1st Subida a Arrate
3rd Klasika Primavera
3rd Overall Vuelta a Andalucía
1957
1st Stage 8 Vuelta a Levante
1st Overall Euskal Bizikleta
2nd Overall Vuelta a La Rioja
1959
1st Stage 7 Vuelta a España
3rd Circuito de Getxo
1960
1st Stage 3 Vuelta a España
1961
1st Circuito de Getxo
1st Subida al Naranco
1962
1st Stage 1 Vuelta a España
2nd Overall Vuelta a Andalucía
3rd Klasika Primavera
1963
1st Prueba Villafranca de Ordizia
1st Stages 1A & 3 Vuelta a España
1st Overall Vuelta a Andalucía

1st Stages 1B & 5

1st Stage 11 Volta a Catalunya
3rd Overall Vuelta a La Rioja
1964
1st Stages 4B & 16 Vuelta a España
1st Overall Vuelta a La Rioja

1st Stages 1 & 2

2nd Overall Vuelta a Levante
