= Libertas (cycling team) =

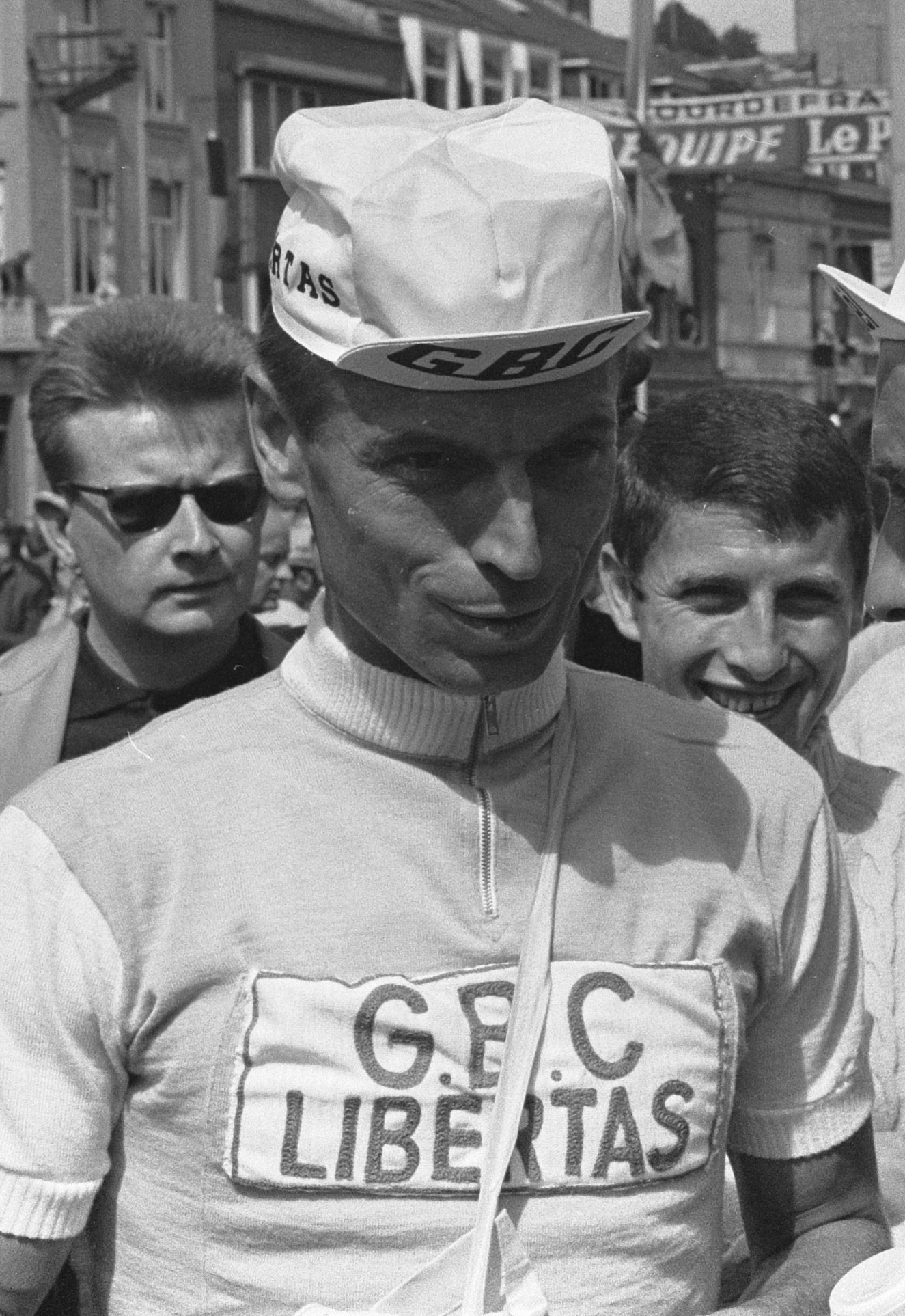
- Rik Van Looy at the 1963 Tour de France

Team information
- Registered: Belgium; Spain (1967)
- Founded: 1952
- Disbanded: 1967
- Discipline: Road

Team name history
- 1952–1953 1954–1956 1957 1958 1959–1961 1962 1963 1964 1965 1966 1967: Libertas; Libertas–Huret; Libertas; Libertas–Dr. Mann; Libertas–Eura Drinks; Libertas; G.B.C.–Libertas; Libertas; Lamot–Libertas; Libertas; Fontpineda–Libertas
Libertas jersey
Jersey

Libertas was a professional cycling team that existed from 1952 to 1967. Its main sponsor was Belgian bicycle manufacturer Libertas.
