= Edgard Sorgeloos =

Belgian cyclist

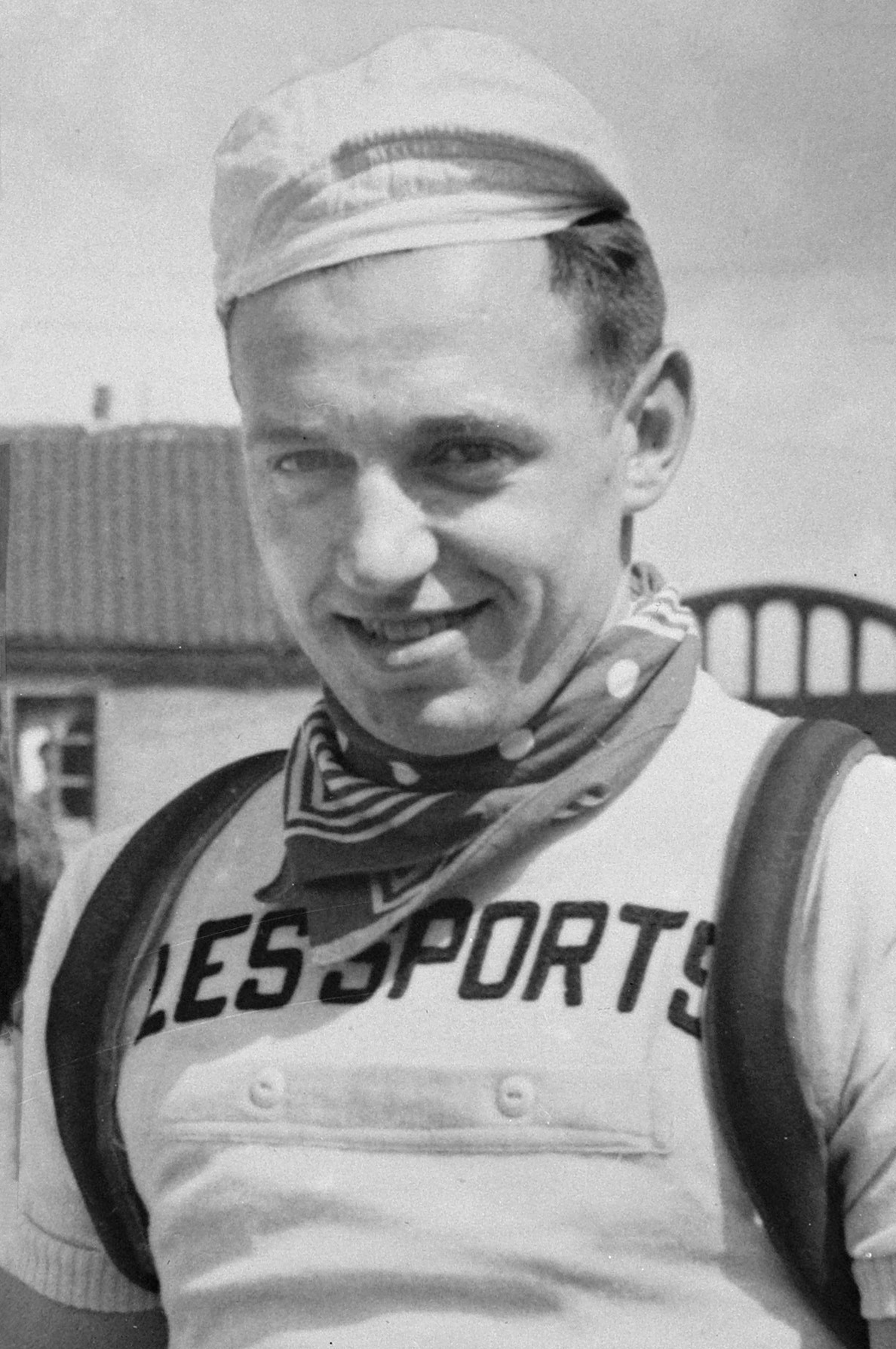
- Edgard Sorgeloos in 1952

Personal information
- Full name: Edgard Sorgeloos
- Born: 14 December 1930 Denderhoutem, Belgium
- Died: 12 November 2016 (aged 85) Oudenaarde, Belgium

Cycling career
- Sport: Cycling
- Discipline: Road
- Role: Rider

Major wins
- 1 stage Tour de France 1965

Edgard Sorgeloos (14 December 1930 – 12 November 2016) was a Belgian professional road bicycle racer. Sorgeloos' biggest success came at the end of his career, when he won a stage in the 1965 Tour de France.

== Major results ==
1951
GP Maurice Depauw
1952
Welle
Circuit de la Dendre
1954
Wervik
Halse Pijl
1955
Erembodegem-Terjoden
Steenhuize-Wijnhuize
Ninove
Halse Pijl
1956
Halse Pijl
Nederbrakel
Gooik
1957
GP de la Famenne
Sint-Lievens-Esse
1958
Aachen
Zeebrugge
GP des Ardennes
Wingene
1959
Sassari – Cagliari
Ronse
1960
Sint-Lievens-Esse
1961
Erembodegem-Terjoden
1962
Düsseldorf
Denderhoutem
Omloop der Vlaamse Gewesten
Grand Prix du Parisien (with Rik Van Looy, Guillaume van Tongerloo, Huub Zilverberg, Joseph Planckaert and Peter Post)
1964
Ronde van Brabant
Sassari – Cagliari
Mol
Zingem
1965
Aalst
Tour de France:

Winner stage 4
